= Ukrainians in Finland =

Ethnic group

Українці Фінляндії / Фінські українці Ukrainalaiset Suomessa / Suomen ukrainalaiset Ukrainare i Finland / Finska ukrainare

Total population
- 49,369 Ukrainian citizens; 46,696 Ukrainian speakers (2025)

Regions with significant populations
- Helsinki, Turku and Tampere regions & Jyväskylä and Lahti

Languages
- Ukrainian, Russian, Finnish, Swedish

Related ethnic groups
- Ukrainian people

Ukrainians in Finland are people who have a background from the country of Ukraine and who live in Finland. People can be born in Ukraine, have Ukrainian ancestry and/or be citizens of Ukraine. As of 2025, there were 27,542 people born in Ukraine living in Finland. Similarly, the number of people with Ukrainian citizenship was 49,369. The number of people who spoke Ukrainian as their mother tongue was 46,696.

Historically, Ukrainians made up only a small proportion of immigrants in Finland, but their numbers increased significantly after the Russian invasion of Ukraine in 2022.

== History ==
Since June 1918 about 60 Ukrainians lived in Finland. However the amount of Ukrainians in Finland for almost 70 years was unknown until 1992. Before the Russian invasion of Ukraine, many Ukrainians came to work in Finland as berry pickers during the summer. In 2016 over 9,000 Ukrainian berry pickers arrived in Finland. Their average earnings during 2015 was 666 euros.

The number of Ukrainian refugees has greatly increased since the 2022 Russian invasion of Ukraine. By July 2022 nearly 7,000 school-aged Ukrainian refugees have arrived in Finland. Schools in Finland have prepared for the start of the school year in Autumn by increasing study groups and hiring more teachers. Ministry of the Interior estimated that up to 40,000-80,000 Ukrainian refugees may arrive in Finland during 2022.

From 2015 to July 2022 a total of 122,000 Ukrainians have submitted applications to the Finnish Immigration Service, 43,500 during 2022. Of those 43,500, nearly 36,000 sought international protection. 95% of them received a positive decision, with the rest of them being expired decisions.

== Demographics ==
Historical population
Year	Pop.	±% p.a.
1990	11	—
1995	133	+64.62%
2000	337	+20.44%
2005	611	+12.64%
2010	1,287	+16.07%
2015	2,843	+17.18%
2020	5,961	+15.96%
2025	46,696	+50.94%
Ukrainian speakers. Source: Statistics Finland

In absolute numbers Uusimaa and Finland Proper are home to most Ukrainians, though proportionally Ostrobothnia has the most Ukrainians. Ukrainian is the third most spoken foreign-language in Southern Ostrobothnia. During 2020, the number of Ukrainian speakers grew by 1,317, making it the fifth fastest growing language after English, Russian, Arabic and Persian. 52.2% of Ukrainian speakers are men. 16.2% are aged 0–14, 82.3% 15-64 and 1.5% are over the age of 65.

In 2019, the most common occupation for Ukrainians was farming and livestock raisers, with 28% of employed Ukrainians being in this sector. In 2019, 147 babies were born to Ukrainian mothers, the birth rate being 56.7 per 1,000 Ukrainian women. For Finnish women the number was 14.9.

== Population by municipalities ==
People born in Ukraine and living in Finland, according to Statistics Finland.

Country of birth Ukraine by municipality (2024)
Municipality	Population
Whole country	23,017
Helsinki	1,668
Vantaa	1,406
Espoo	1,216
Turku	1,127
Tampere	661
Jyväskylä	636
Lahti	588
Vaasa	491
Salo	487
Kuopio	465
Seinäjoki	350
Joensuu	333
Järvenpää	326
Pori	309
Kirkkonummi	306
Mikkeli	298
Raisio	292
Oulu	288
Kotka	279
Hämeenlinna	276
Jakobstad	274
Rovaniemi	255
Pieksämäki	235
Laitila	232
Kouvola	231
Riihimäki	220
Kauhava	217
Kerava	215
Porvoo	207
Varkaus	199
Hyvinkää	194
Kajaani	194
Lappeenranta	192
Kokkola	179
Forssa	178
Rauma	167
Loimaa	164
Uusikaupunki	161
Kankaanpää	156
Savonlinna	141
Valkeakoski	140
Tuusula	138
Lohja	135
Kurikka	128
Somero	126
Jämsä	125
Nykarleby	125
Hamina	121
Lapua	121
Närpes	116
Imatra	110
Kemi	107
Paimio	105
Kristinestad	100
Sastamala	98
Kitee	97
Äänekoski	94
Nurmijärvi	93
Naantali	92
Raahe	91
Mäntsälä	85
Sotkamo	85
Raseborg	83
Kaarina	80
Vihti	79
Huittinen	78
Kemijärvi	78
Pöytyä	77
Nokia	76
Outokumpu	74
Säkylä	74
Loviisa	72
Mänttä-Vilppula	70
Kauhajoki	69
Iisalmi	67
Lieksa	67
Suonenjoki	67
Sauvo	66
Siilinjärvi	65
Ikaalinen	64
Sipoo	64
Orimattila	62
Vörå	61
Laukaa	56
Vehmaa	55
Kuusamo	54
Saarijärvi	53
Alajärvi	52
Joutsa	52
Mynämäki	50
Juva	49
Keuruu	48
Pargas	48
Joroinen	47
Alavus	46
Eura	46
Mäntyharju	46
Asikkala	45
Pyhäntä	45
Nousiainen	44
Lumijoki	41
Mariehamn	40
Ulvila	40
Kauniainen	39
Kalajoki	38
Nurmes	37
Karkkila	36
Kronoby	34
Nivala	34
Taipalsaari	34
Ylöjärvi	34
Ähtäri	34
Pedersöre	33
Karvia	32
Parkano	32
Ilmajoki	31
Kangasala	31
Rautalampi	31
Heinola	30
Kimitoön	30
Rantasalmi	30
Kaustinen	29
Ylivieska	29
Janakkala	28
Lieto	28
Malax	28
Veteli	28
Pälkäne	27
Haapavesi	26
Harjavalta	26
Loppi	26
Lapinjärvi	25
Kaskinen	24
Kiuruvesi	24
Merikarvia	24
Oripää	24
Oulainen	24
Akaa	23
Kannus	23
Kangasniemi	22
Kärkölä	22
Leppävirta	22
Taivassalo	22
Lapinlahti	21
Luumäki	20
Pello	20
Ruovesi	20
Hanko	19
Kittilä	19
Pyhäjärvi	19
Eurajoki	18
Karstula	18
Rusko	18
Isojoki	17
Masku	17
Korsholm	17
Siuntio	17
Teuva	17
Viitasaari	17
Alavieska	16
Hankasalmi	16
Lappajärvi	16
Hollola	15
Jämijärvi	15
Liminka	15
Pirkkala	15
Isokyrö	14
Keitele	14
Lempäälä	14
Miehikkälä	14
Tornio	14
Tyrnävä	14
Urjala	14
Vesanto	14
Evijärvi	13
Finström	13
Kokemäki	13
Konnevesi	13
Korsnäs	13
Puolanka	13
Savitaipale	13
Sodankylä	13
Toholampi	13
Kuortane	12
Larsmo	12
Padasjoki	12
Saltvik	12
Tohmajärvi	12
Vaala	12
Vimpeli	12
Kempele	11
Kuhmoinen	11
Liperi	11
Paltamo	11
Haapajärvi	10
Hausjärvi	10
Hämeenkyrö	10
Jomala	10
Juuka	10
Punkalaidun	10

People with Ukrainian citizenship living in Finland according to Statistics Finland.

Citizens of Ukraine by municipality (2024)
Municipality	Population
Whole country	41,403
Helsinki	2,825
Vantaa	2,314
Turku	2,034
Espoo	2,011
Jyväskylä	1,207
Lahti	1,110
Tampere	1,093
Salo	911
Vaasa	869
Kuopio	837
Järvenpää	689
Raisio	638
Kirkkonummi	612
Mikkeli	597
Seinäjoki	561
Joensuu	555
Pori	530
Kotka	502
Oulu	501
Hämeenlinna	499
Rovaniemi	491
Riihimäki	477
Pieksämäki	461
Jakobstad	438
Laitila	437
Kouvola	428
Hyvinkää	387
Kerava	377
Kauhava	375
Porvoo	370
Rauma	365
Kajaani	356
Varkaus	355
Forssa	312
Kokkola	310
Lappeenranta	302
Kankaanpää	299
Jämsä	294
Loimaa	291
Uusikaupunki	291
Tuusula	290
Somero	286
Valkeakoski	282
Hamina	252
Lohja	249
Imatra	248
Savonlinna	229
Lapua	220
Kemi	217
Kurikka	210
Äänekoski	208
Paimio	199
Mäntsälä	194
Sastamala	192
Nykarleby	176
Kitee	174
Naantali	167
Kemijärvi	164
Närpes	161
Kristinestad	158
Mänttä-Vilppula	157
Outokumpu	157
Nurmijärvi	155
Säkylä	150
Kaarina	146
Sotkamo	145
Vihti	144
Siilinjärvi	142
Pöytyä	141
Loviisa	140
Raahe	138
Nokia	136
Orimattila	136
Raseborg	133
Huittinen	132
Sauvo	123
Suonenjoki	118
Lieksa	117
Ikaalinen	115
Laukaa	113
Saarijärvi	113
Iisalmi	101
Joutsa	101
Keuruu	99
Sipoo	99
Vehmaa	94
Kauhajoki	93
Vörå	93
Eura	92
Joroinen	91
Pyhäntä	91
Nousiainen	90
Ulvila	84
Kalajoki	82
Mynämäki	82
Pargas	82
Asikkala	81
Juva	81
Kuusamo	81
Karkkila	80
Alajärvi	78
Mäntyharju	77
Alavus	73
Lumijoki	72
Taipalsaari	72
Malax	64
Ylivieska	64
Kangasala	61
Kauniainen	61
Kangasniemi	60
Ähtäri	60
Heinola	59
Rantasalmi	59
Nivala	58
Kimitoön	57
Taivassalo	55
Pälkäne	54
Nurmes	53
Oripää	53
Harjavalta	52
Rautalampi	52
Lieto	51
Janakkala	50
Kronoby	50
Luumäki	49
Karvia	47
Merikarvia	47
Ylöjärvi	47
Loppi	45
Mariehamn	45
Veteli	45
Parkano	44
Akaa	43
Haapavesi	43
Kaustinen	43
Kaskinen	42
Ilmajoki	41
Oulainen	41
Ruovesi	39
Lapinlahti	38
Pyhäjärvi	38
Karstula	37
Kärkölä	36
Hanko	35
Kittilä	35
Viitasaari	35
Kiuruvesi	34
Kannus	33
Lapinjärvi	33
Leppävirta	33
Pedersöre	33
Pello	33
Eurajoki	32
Savitaipale	32
Siuntio	31
Pirkkala	30
Puolanka	30
Sodankylä	30
Konnevesi	29
Rusko	29
Kokemäki	28
Vesanto	28
Alavieska	27
Hämeenkyrö	27
Lappajärvi	27
Urjala	27
Evijärvi	25
Hollola	24
Isojoki	24
Teuva	24
Hankasalmi	23
Kuhmoinen	23
Kuortane	23
Korsholm	23
Juuka	22
Masku	22
Miehikkälä	22
Isokyrö	21
Korsnäs	21
Liminka	21
Liperi	21
Padasjoki	21
Sonkajärvi	21
Tornio	21
Keitele	20
Lempäälä	20
Toholampi	20
Ilomantsi	19
Vieremä	19
Jämijärvi	18
Larsmo	18
Tohmajärvi	18
Tyrnävä	18
Paltamo	17
Rääkkylä	17
Aura	16
Haapajärvi	16
Ranua	16
Tammela	16
Kustavi	15
Vaala	15
Vimpeli	15
Hausjärvi	14
Karijoki	14
Kempele	14
Parikkala	14
Pihtipudas	14
Virolahti	14
Hirvensalmi	13
Marttila	13
Orivesi	13
Punkalaidun	13
Saltvik	13
Finström	12
Sulkava	12
Föglö	11
Halsua	11
Kolari	11
Sysmä	11
Toivakka	11
Uurainen	11
Virrat	11
Inari	10
Jomala	10
Koski Tl	10
Rautavaara	10
Sievi	10

People with Ukrainian as mother tongue living in Finland according to Statistics Finland.

Ukrainian speakers by municipality (2024)
Municipality	Population
Whole country	38,850
Helsinki	2,654
Vantaa	2,129
Turku	1,892
Espoo	1,856
Jyväskylä	1,072
Tampere	1,044
Lahti	1,006
Salo	857
Vaasa	832
Kuopio	741
Järvenpää	604
Raisio	576
Kirkkonummi	561
Seinäjoki	553
Mikkeli	552
Pori	522
Joensuu	500
Hämeenlinna	477
Jakobstad	460
Oulu	453
Laitila	443
Rovaniemi	418
Pieksämäki	408
Kotka	405
Riihimäki	400
Kouvola	389
Kerava	366
Kauhava	361
Hyvinkää	343
Varkaus	341
Porvoo	334
Kajaani	317
Rauma	306
Loimaa	305
Kankaanpää	303
Forssa	298
Uusikaupunki	288
Kokkola	283
Valkeakoski	272
Jämsä	264
Tuusula	257
Lappeenranta	255
Somero	242
Hamina	236
Lohja	225
Savonlinna	223
Kurikka	218
Lapua	217
Nykarleby	206
Paimio	202
Imatra	201
Sastamala	191
Kemi	184
Mäntsälä	181
Äänekoski	175
Kitee	174
Närpes	168
Naantali	158
Säkylä	150
Huittinen	149
Kristinestad	148
Nurmijärvi	148
Vihti	145
Pöytyä	144
Raseborg	142
Siilinjärvi	138
Kemijärvi	136
Outokumpu	136
Sotkamo	136
Kaarina	135
Mänttä-Vilppula	135
Orimattila	134
Loviisa	130
Nokia	130
Sauvo	120
Raahe	118
Suonenjoki	114
Ikaalinen	110
Sipoo	105
Iisalmi	103
Mynämäki	103
Lieksa	101
Vehmaa	101
Kauhajoki	100
Laukaa	97
Vörå	97
Eura	96
Keuruu	96
Saarijärvi	96
Pargas	94
Joutsa	92
Joroinen	91
Ulvila	89
Nousiainen	86
Juva	84
Kalajoki	84
Alajärvi	80
Alavus	80
Asikkala	79
Kuusamo	77
Mäntyharju	73
Taipalsaari	71
Lumijoki	70
Ylivieska	65
Malax	63
Taivassalo	61
Ylöjärvi	61
Kimitoön	60
Kauniainen	59
Heinola	58
Oripää	58
Harjavalta	57
Rantasalmi	56
Lieto	55
Nurmes	54
Luumäki	53
Ähtäri	53
Kaustinen	52
Kronoby	52
Mariehamn	51
Pedersöre	51
Pälkäne	51
Janakkala	49
Rautalampi	49
Kangasniemi	47
Parkano	47
Loppi	46
Merikarvia	45
Akaa	44
Veteli	44
Karvia	43
Nivala	43
Kaskinen	42
Kannus	40
Haapavesi	39
Ruovesi	38
Rusko	38
Oulainen	37
Siuntio	37
Lapinlahti	36
Viitasaari	36
Hanko	35
Kärkölä	35
Korsholm	35
Lapinjärvi	34
Ilmajoki	33
Kiuruvesi	33
Karstula	32
Kittilä	32
Leppävirta	32
Pyhäjärvi	32
Lempäälä	31
Savitaipale	31
Hämeenkyrö	30
Pello	30
Sodankylä	30
Isojoki	28
Puolanka	27
Vesanto	27
Eurajoki	26
Konnevesi	26
Lappajärvi	26
Masku	26
Pirkkala	26
Alavieska	25
Evijärvi	25
Kokemäki	25
Urjala	25
Padasjoki	24
Hollola	23
Miehikkälä	23
Juuka	22
Teuva	22
Hankasalmi	21
Isokyrö	21
Liminka	21
Sonkajärvi	21
Toholampi	21
Jämijärvi	20
Keitele	20
Tohmajärvi	20
Vieremä	19
Hausjärvi	18
Ilomantsi	18
Kuhmoinen	18
Kuortane	18
Larsmo	18
Tyrnävä	18
Liperi	17
Paltamo	17
Finström	16
Haapajärvi	16
Korsnäs	15
Punkalaidun	15
Rääkkylä	15
Vaala	15
Aura	14
Inari	14
Orivesi	14
Saltvik	14
Tammela	14
Karijoki	13
Kempele	13
Marttila	13
Parikkala	13
Vimpeli	13
Virrat	13
Ranua	12
Sysmä	12
Föglö	11
Halsua	11
Jomala	11
Kolari	11
Kustavi	11
Sulkava	11
Virolahti	11
Hirvensalmi	10
Ingå	10
Koski Tl	10
Kuhmo	10
Laihia	10
Rautavaara	10
Tuusniemi	10
Uurainen	10

== Organizations ==
The Ukrainian Association in Finland was founded in 1997.

There is also another organization called Ukrainians of Finland.

== Notable people ==
- Dalia Stasevska, conductor

== See also ==
- Finland–Ukraine relations
- Immigration to Finland
- Ukrainian diaspora
- Ukrainians in Sweden
