= Paikallislehti Sisä-Savo =

Paikiallislehti Sisä-Savo
- Type: Newspaper
- Editor-in-chief: Tarja Lappalainen
- Founded: 1965; 61 years ago
- Language: Finnish
- Circulation: 6,479 (2014)
- Website: Paikallislehti Sisä-Savo

Paikallislehti Sisä-Savo is a Finnish newspaper published by Savon Media Oy. It was established in 1965.

The newspaper is published every Tuesday and Thursday.

In 2014, the circulation was 6479. The paper came out 2 times per week and was delivered in the municipalities of Rautalampi, Suonenjoki, Tervo, Vesanto and Karttula.
