= Southern Konnevesi National Park =

Finnish national park

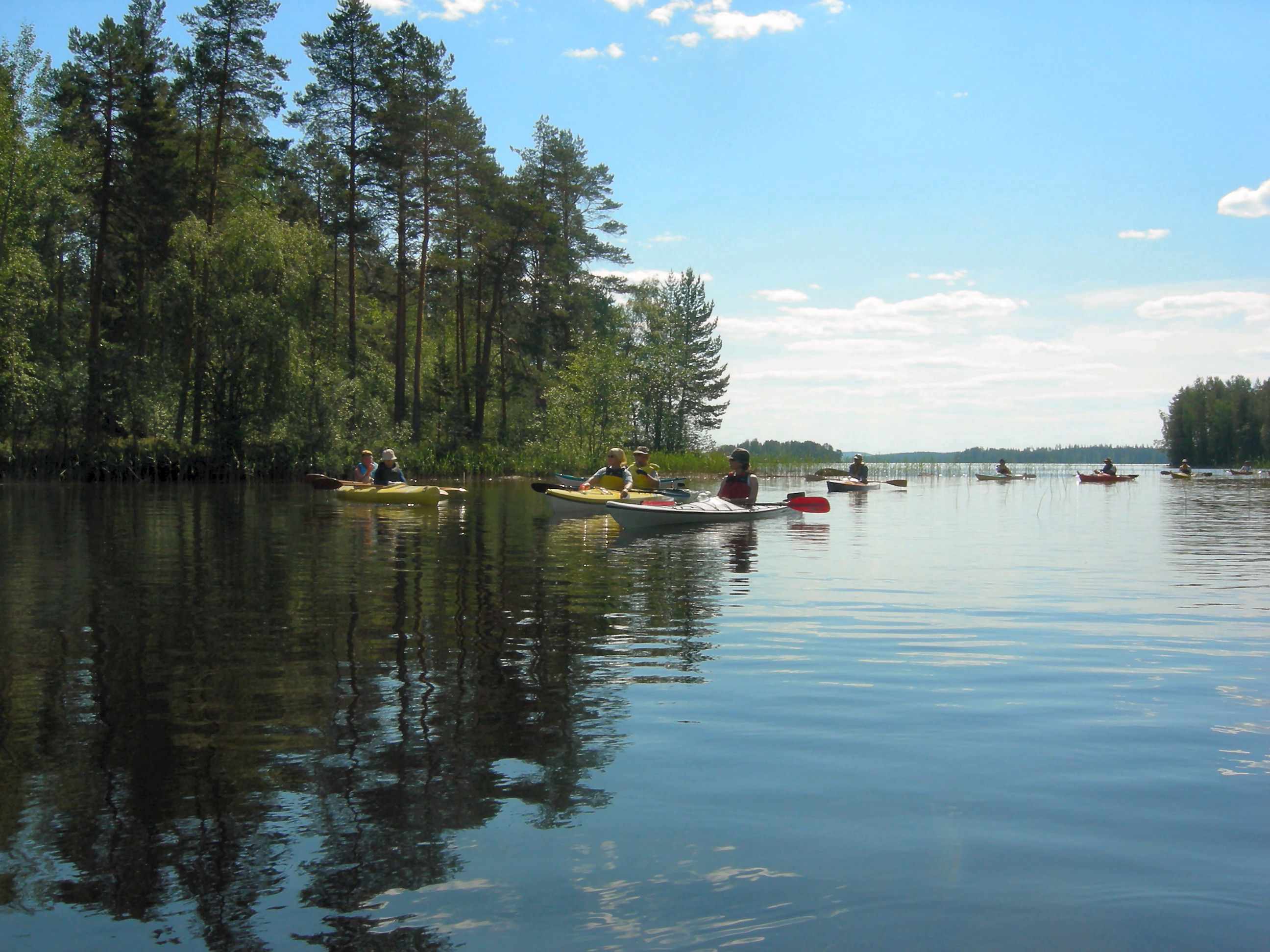
- Interactive map of Southern Konnevesi National Park
- Location: Finland
- Coordinates: 62°33′30″N 26°38′50″E
- Area: 15 km^{2} (5.8 sq mi)
- Established: 2014
- Visitors: 30,400 (in 2024)
- Website: https://www.luontoon.fi/en/destinations/southern-konnevesi-national-park

Southern Konnevesi National Park (Finnish: Etelä-Konneveden kansallispuisto) is situated in the Finnish Lakeland on the border of the regions Central Finland and Northern Savonia, in the municipalities of Konnevesi and Rautalampi.

The park includes islands in the southern part of Lake Konnevesi and an extensive continuous stretch of mainland on the lake's eastern shore. The national park is located to the south of main road 69 and to the north-west of highway 9. In the park visitors can enjoy the wide open waters of the lake in a boat, or canoe through a maze of islands among smooth glaciated rocks and vertical rock walls. In the clear water, you will be able to catch a glimpse of the depths that are the domain of wild brown trout. You can also trek from herb-rich forests to high cliffs for a view over the magnificent landscape of the osprey.

University of Jyväskylä has a Research Station at Konnevesi. Konnevesi Research Station has become famous on experimental ecology, both on terrestrial and aquatic one.
