= Kalle Matilainen =

Kalle Matilainen may refer to:

- Kalle Matilainen (runner)
- Kalle Matilainen (politician)
