= Rautalampi =

- Municipality
- Rautalammin kunta Rautalampi kommun
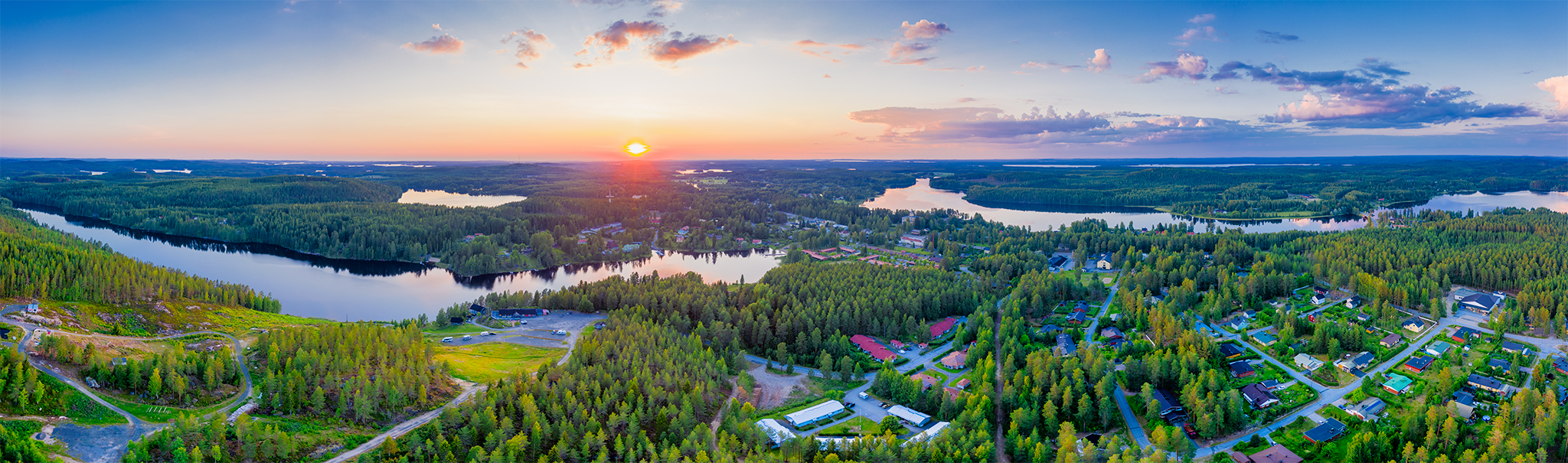

- Coat of arms

- Location of Rautalampi in Finland
- Interactive map of Rautalampi
- Coordinates: 62°37.3′N 026°50′E
- Country: Finland
- Region: North Savo
- Sub-region: Inner Savo
- Charter: 1561

Government
  - Municipal manager: Risto Niemelä

Area (2018-01-01)
  - Total: 761.98 km^{2} (294.20 sq mi)
  - Land: 538.95 km^{2} (208.09 sq mi)
  - Water: 222.99 km^{2} (86.10 sq mi)
  - Rank: 161st largest in Finland

Population (2025-12-31)
  - Total: 2,928
  - Rank: 215th largest in Finland
  - Density: 5.43/km^{2} (14.1/sq mi)

Population by native language
  - Finnish: 94.9% (official)
  - Others: 5.1%

Population by age
  - 0 to 14: 12.1%
  - 15 to 64: 51.9%
  - 65 or older: 36.1%
- Time zone: UTC+02:00 (EET)
  - Summer (DST): UTC+03:00 (EEST)
- Website: www.rautalampi.fi/english/

Rautalampi (Finnish pronunciation: [ˈrɑu̯tɑˌlɑmpi]) is a municipality of Finland. It is located in the North Savo region. The municipality has a population of 2,928 (31 December 2025) and covers an area of 761.98 square kilometres (294.20 sq mi) of which 222.99 km^{2} (86.10 sq mi) is water. The population density is 5.43 inhabitants per square kilometre (14.1/sq mi). The municipality is unilingually Finnish.

Neighbouring municipalities are Hankasalmi, Konnevesi, Pieksämäki, Suonenjoki, Tervo and Vesanto. The distance from Rautalampi to Kuopio is about 70 kilometers.

== Name ==
The name of the municipality means "iron pond", which is also why the coat of arms of the municipality features the symbol of iron.

== History ==
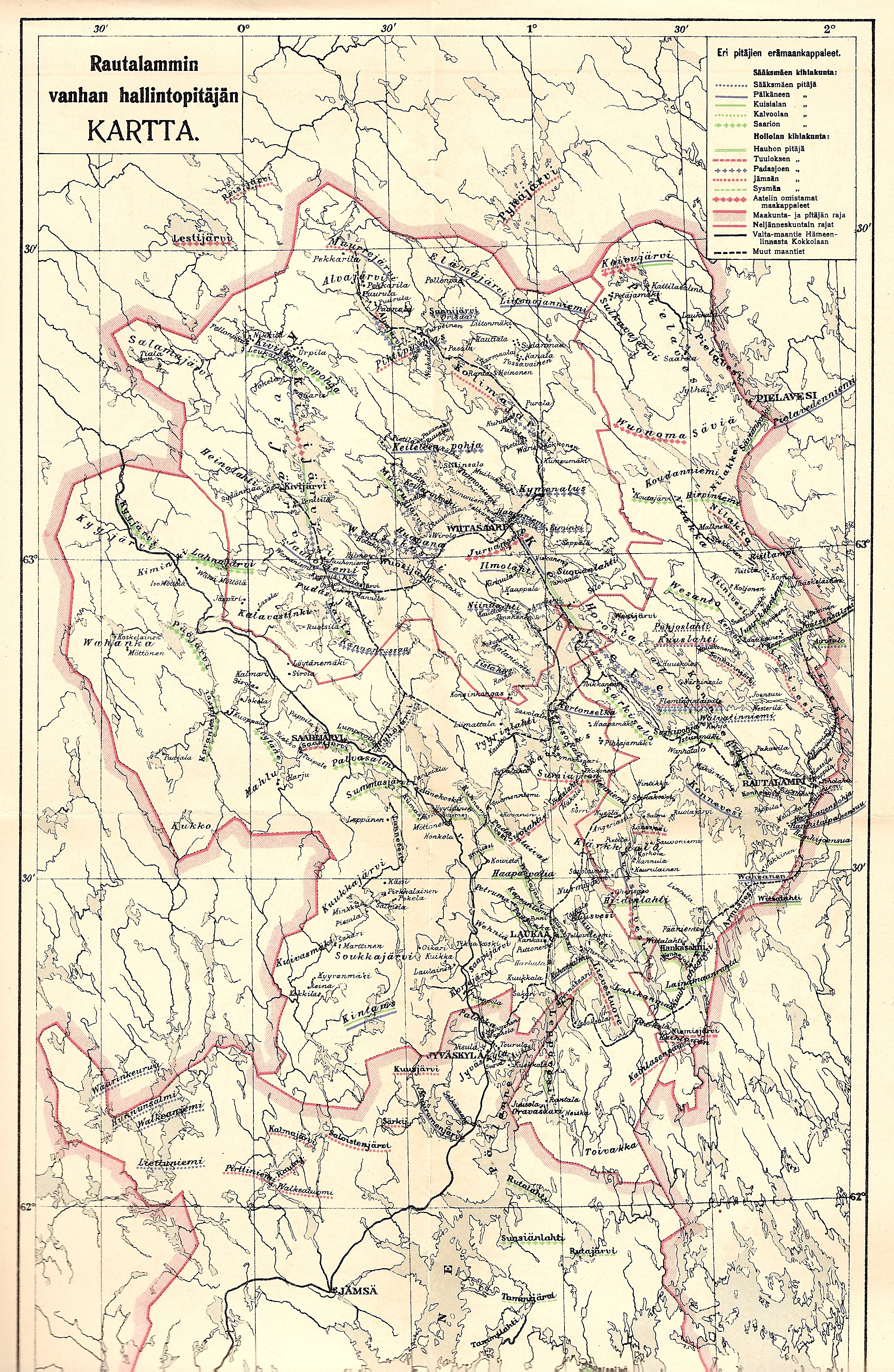
The administrative division of Rautalampi. The thinner red borders represent the fourths.

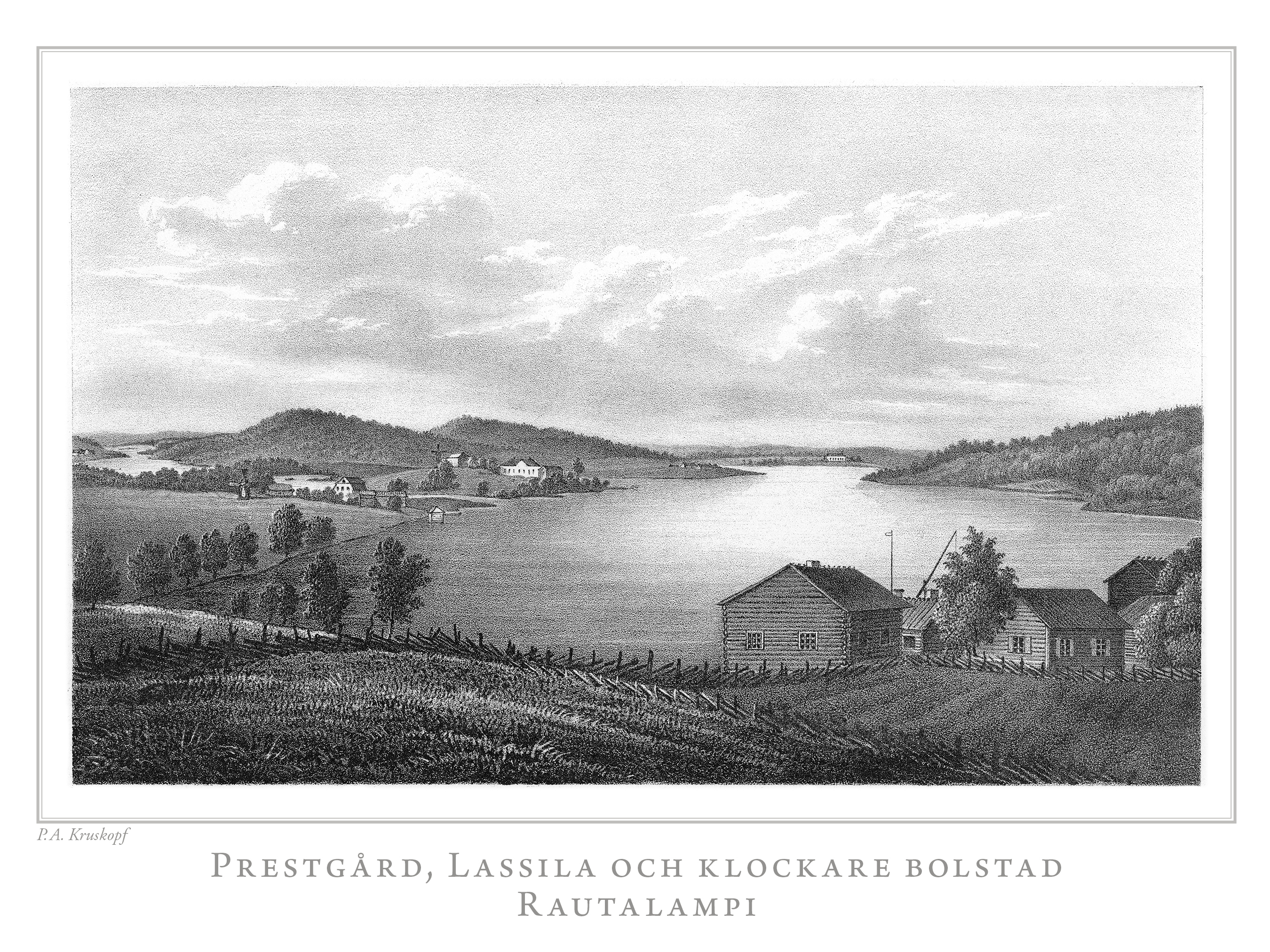
Illustration of Rautalampi in Finland framstäldt i teckningar edited by Zacharias Topelius and published 1845–1852.

The village was first mentioned in 1549, when it was a part of the parish (pitäjä) of Sysmä. Even though Rautalampi was a part of Tavastia, most of its settlers were Savonians who came to the area in the 16th century. The oldest documents (1552-1554) on Rautalampi only mention 22 Tavastian settlers in the area, while there were 57 Savonian settlers. The parish (pitäjä) of Rautalampi was established in 1561. It was a large parish which included parts of 27 modern municipalities, most of them in the modern region of Central Finland.

Administratively Rautalampi was divided into three divisions (despite their amount, called "fourths"):

- Keitele, named after the lake Keitele, containing modern Viitasaari, Kivijärvi (incl. Kinnula and the Salamajärvi village in modern Perho), Kannonkoski and Pihtipudas, as well as the villages of Särkisalo (now in Konnevesi) and Horontaipale (now in Vesanto) and most of Konginkangas
- Konnevesi, named after the lake Konnevesi, containing modern Rautalampi proper, Konnevesi, Hankasalmi, Vesanto, Keitele, part of Tervo and the Tavastian side of Pielavesi,
- Saraavesi, named after the lake Saraavesi, containing modern Laukaa (incl. Äänekoski+Suolahti), Sumiainen, Uurainen, Saarijärvi (incl. Pylkönmäki), Karstula (incl. Kyyjärvi) as well as most of Jyväskylä (incl. Toivakka) and Petäjävesi.

Not too long after the establishment of the parish, most likely in 1563, the divisions were renamed: Keitele became Kymi, Konnevesi became Rautalampi and Saraavesi became Pernasalo. The Kymi fourth was later renamed to Kivijärvi in 1617. The territories of the fourths did not change until the fourths were abolished entirely in 1684.

The first ecclesiastical division of the Rautalampi parish happened when Laukaa became separate in 1628, while the last division was the separation of Konnevesi in 1919 (administratively slightly later in 1922).

== National park ==
Southern Konnevesi National Park was established in 2014. It is known for its prehistoric rock paintings.

== Culture ==
=== Music ===
The Finnish rock band Grand Merlin, originally from Rautalampi, made a Finnish-language cover version of the 1974 Lynyrd Skynyrd single "Sweet Home Alabama" in 1983. The song under the name "Rautalampi" was written by the band's bassist Hannu Niskanen.

=== Food ===
In the 1980s, the traditional dish of Rautalampi was a "cobbler's roast" (Suutarin paisti) made of browned pork and vendace.

== Notable people ==
- Juho Heimonen (1861–1930)
- Kustaa Jalkanen (1862–1921)
- August Raatikainen (1874–1937)
- Ville Heimonen (1875–1951)
- Mikko Hult (1915–1993)
- Urpo Korhonen (1923–2009)
- Anne Hänninen (born 1958)
- Sisko Hanhijoki (born 1962)
- Martti Marttinen, the great-grandfather of John Morton
- Anna-Reeta Korhonen (1809–1893)

== See also ==
- Finnish national road 69
