= Heimonen =

Heimonen is a Finnish surname. Notable people with the surname include:

- Juho Heimonen (1861–1930), Finnish farmer and politician
- Taavetti Heimonen (1870–1920), Finnish politician
- Marcus Heimonen (born 1993), Finnish footballer
