= Anna-Reeta Korhonen =

Finnish poet (1809-1893 )

- Born: 5 February 1809 Rautalampi, Finland
- Died: 1 October 1893 (aged 84) Vesanto
- Occupation: poet

Anna Margaretha Lyytinen or Anna-Reeta Korhonen (5 February 1809 Rautalampi – 1 October 1893 Vesanto) was a Finnish folk poet.

Korhonen's parents were folk poet Paavo Korhonen aka Vihta-Paavo and Liisa Huttunen. She was married to Sakari Lyytinen.

== Works ==
Poems by Pentti Lyytinen and Anna-Reetta Korhonen, edited by Vihtori Laurila. Peuran Museum Foundation, Rautalampi 1961
