= Ilmari Tossavainen =

Finnish politician (1887–1978)

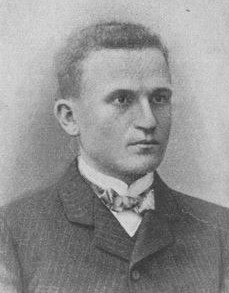

Johannes Ilmari Tossavainen (25 July 1887, Keitele - 26 January 1978) was a Finnish cooperative manager and politician. He was a member of the Parliament of Finland from 1913 to 1916, representing the Social Democratic Party of Finland (SDP).
