= Anne Hänninen =

Finnish poet, essayist, and writer (born 1958)

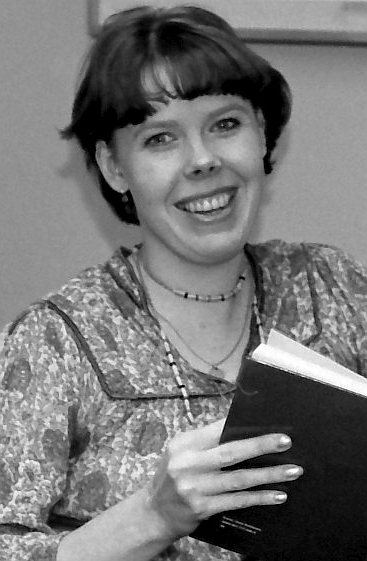
Anne Hänninen in 1982

Anne Hänninen (born 7 February 1958 in Rautalampi) is a Finnish poet, essayist, and writer. She studied literature and journalism. Hänninen has mostly written poetry.

Hänninen's poetry "started by denouncing the possibility of living according to a rational order". Her work has been published in several anthologies, and has been translated into Swedish, English, Russian and Icelandic.

== Selected works ==
"Do you go entirely when you go?
No one can go on your behalf.
Though on your behalf the whole world existed."
-Anne Hänninen

- Yön tina sulaa aamuun, 1978. ISBN 951-0-08857-9.
- Auringonlaskun portaat, 1980. ISBN 951-0-10166-4.
- Tulitemppeli. Porvoo, 1982. ISBN 951-0-11502-9.
- Ikuisuudenavara, 1986. ISBN 951-0-13884-3.
- Sekuntipilarit, 1989. ISBN 951-0-15994-8.
- Hedelmäntäysi, 1991. ISBN 951-0-17463-7.
- Miekkaliljat, 1994. ISBN 951-0-19395-X.
- Musta vuode, 1997. ISBN 951-0-22267-4.
- Tuulen vilja, 2000. ISBN 951-0-24470-8.
- Sateen muisti, 2002. ISBN 951-0-27615-4.
- Oljilla täytetty nainen, 2005. ISBN 951-0-30975-3.
- Surusidonta, 2009. ISBN 978-951-0-35621-0.

== Awards ==
- Finland Province Writers Award, 1991
- Kalevi Jäntti Prize, 1992
- Korpi Rastas Award, 1992
- Häme Art Prize, 2000
- WSOY Award, 2005
