= Liesvesi =

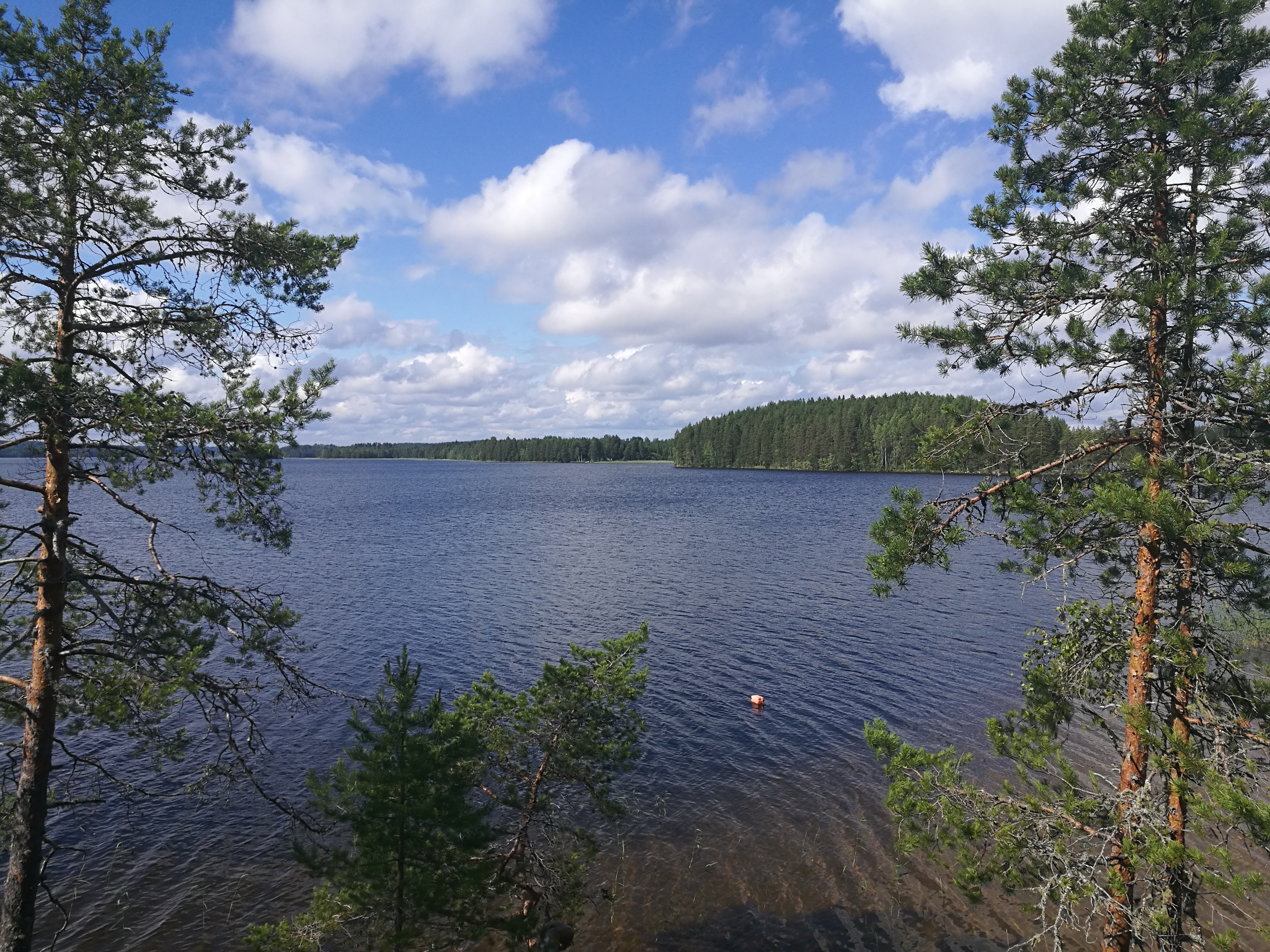
- Liesvesi seen from its eastern shore
- Interactive map of Liesvesi
- Coordinates: 62°34′N 26°17′E
- Type: Lake
- Basin countries: Finland
- Surface area: 14.0 km^{2} (5.4 sq mi)
- Average depth: 6.0 m (19.7 ft)
- Max. depth: 20.7 m (68 ft)
- Water volume: 0.084 km^{3} (68,000 acre⋅ft)
- Shore length^{1}: 71.28 km (44.29 mi)
- Surface elevation: 90.3 m (296 ft)
- Frozen: December–April
- ^{1} Shore length is not a well-defined measure.

Liesvesi is a medium-sized lake of Central Finland in the Kymijoki main catchment area. It is situated in the Konnevesi municipality. It belongs to the Konnevesi-Laukaa canoeing route.

== See also ==
- List of lakes in Finland
