= Mikko Hult =

Finnish politician

Mikko Olavi Hult (22 March 1915 in Rautalampi – 6 May 1993) was a Finnish smallholder and politician. He was a member of the Parliament of Finland from 1954 to 1962. Hult first represented the Social Democratic Party of Finland (SDP), and later the Social Democratic Union of Workers and Smallholders (TPSL).
