= Ville Heimonen =

Finnish politician

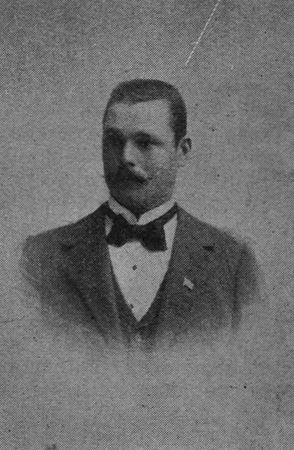
Ville Heimonen

Ville Heimonen (6 March 1875, Rautalampi – 1 July 1951) was a Finnish trade union activist and politician. He served as a Member of the Parliament of Finland from 1907 to 1908, representing the Social Democratic Party of Finland (SDP).
