= List of municipalities of Finland =

This is a list of municipalities in Finland. There are a total of 308 municipalities, of which 114 have both a Finnish and a Swedish name. These municipalities are listed by the name in the local majority language, with the name in the other national language provided in parentheses. Finnish is the majority language in 99 of these 114 municipalities, while Swedish is the majority language in the remaining 15 municipalities. The four municipalities that are wholly or partly within the Sami native region have their names also given in the local Sami languages. (Note: Inari Sami, Skolt Sami and Northern Sami in the case of Inari; only Northern Sami in the other cases.)

Municipality	Administrative center	Location on map	Land area (km^{2})	Population (2025-03-31)	Density (/km^{2})
Finland total			303,963	5,640,437	18.6
Akaa (Swedish: Ackas)	Toijala		293	16,407	55.9
Alajärvi	Alajärvi		1,009	9,069	9.0
Alavieska	Alavieska		252	2,395	9.5
Alavus (Swedish: Alavo)	Alavus		1,087	10,763	9.9
Asikkala	Vääksy		563	7,872	14.0
Askola	Askola		212	4,678	22.0
Aura	Aura		95	3,972	41.8
Brändö	Åva		108	427	3.9
Eckerö	Eckerö (Överby)		108	958	8.9
Enonkoski	Enonkoski		306	1,275	4.2
Enontekiö (Northern Sami: Eanodat, Swedish: Enontekis)	Hetta		7,953	1,769	0.2
Espoo (Swedish: Esbo)	Espoon keskus		312	322,180	1,031.5
Eura	Eura		579	11,090	19.2
Eurajoki (Swedish: Euraåminne)	Eurajoki		515	9,034	17.5
Evijärvi	Evijärvi		354	2,275	6.4
Finström	Godby		123	2,646	21.4
Forssa	Forssa		249	16,417	66.0
Föglö	Föglö (Degerby)		135	503	3.7
Geta	Geta (Vestergeta)		85	523	6.2
Haapajärvi	Haapajärvi		766	6,490	8.5
Haapavesi	Haapavesi		1,050	6,355	6.0
Hailuoto (Swedish: Karlö)	Hailuoto		206	923	4.5
Halsua (Swedish: Halso)	Halsua		413	994	2.4
Hamina (Swedish: Fredrikshamn)	Hamina		610	19,320	31.7
Hammarland	Hammarland (Kattby)		139	1,631	11.8
Hankasalmi	Hankasalmi		572	4,489	7.9
Hanko (Swedish: Hangö)	Hanko		117	7,689	65.5
Harjavalta	Harjavalta		123	6,612	53.5
Hartola (Swedish: Gustav Adolfs)	Hartola		543	2,476	4.6
Hattula	Parola		358	9,355	26.1
Hausjärvi	Oitti		389	7,905	20.3
Heinola	Heinola		676	17,830	26.4
Heinävesi	Heinävesi		1,030	2,916	2.8
Helsinki (Swedish: Helsingfors)	Helsinki		214	686,595	3,202.1
Hirvensalmi	Hirvensalmi		465	2,047	4.4
Hollola	Salpakangas		651	22,879	35.1
Huittinen (Swedish: Vittis)	Huittinen (Lauttakylä)		533	9,588	18.0
Humppila	Humppila		148	2,086	14.1
Hyrynsalmi	Hyrynsalmi		1,421	1,996	1.4
Hyvinkää (Swedish: Hyvinge)	Hyvinkää		323	47,077	145.9
Hämeenkyrö (Swedish: Tavastkyro)	Hämeenkyrö		464	10,339	22.3
Hämeenlinna (Swedish: Tavastehus)	Hämeenlinna		1,785	68,440	38.3
Ii (Swedish: Ijo)	Ii (Iin Hamina)		1,616	9,789	6.1
Iisalmi (Swedish: Idensalmi)	Iisalmi		763	20,408	26.7
Iitti (Swedish: Itis)	Kausala		590	6,387	10.8
Ikaalinen (Swedish: Ikalis)	Ikaalinen		750	6,733	9.0
Ilmajoki (Swedish: Ilmola)	Ilmajoki		577	12,471	21.6
Ilomantsi (Swedish: Ilomants)	Ilomantsi		2,763	4,356	1.6
Imatra	Mansikkala		155	24,632	158.9
Inari (Inari Sami: Aanaar, Skolt Sami: Aanar, Northern Sami: Anár, Swedish: Enare)	Ivalo		15,060	7,210	0.5
Ingå (Finnish: Inkoo)	Ingå		351	5,401	15.4
Isojoki (Swedish: Storå)	Isojoki		642	1,778	2.8
Isokyrö (Swedish: Storkyro)	Isokyrö		354	4,302	12.1
Jakobstad (Finnish: Pietarsaari)	Jakobstad		89	19,658	222.1
Janakkala	Turenki		547	16,006	29.2
Joensuu	Joensuu		2,382	78,741	33.1
Jokioinen (Swedish: Jockis)	Jokioinen		180	4,838	26.8
Jomala	Jomala (Prästgården)		143	5,780	40.5
Joroinen (Swedish: Jorois)	Joroinen		575	4,533	7.9
Joutsa	Joutsa		867	4,093	4.7
Juuka (Swedish: Juga)	Juuka		1,502	4,134	2.8
Juupajoki	Korkeakoski		258	1,667	6.4
Juva	Juva		1,163	5,652	4.9
Jyväskylä	Jyväskylä		1,171	149,213	127.4
Jämijärvi	Jämijärvi		215	1,668	7.8
Jämsä	Jämsä		1,571	19,139	12.2
Järvenpää (Swedish: Träskända)	Järvenpää		38	46,933	1,250.2
Kaarina (Swedish: S:t Karins)	Kaarina		151	36,563	242.8
Kaavi	Kaavi		674	2,592	3.8
Kajaani (Swedish: Kajana)	Kajaani		1,835	36,504	19.9
Kalajoki	Kalajoki		924	12,228	13.2
Kangasala	Kangasala		658	34,241	52.0
Kangasniemi	Kangasniemi		1,069	5,036	4.7
Kankaanpää	Kankaanpää		1,021	12,549	12.3
Kannonkoski	Kannonkoski		445	1,184	2.7
Kannus	Kannus		468	5,268	11.3
Karijoki (Swedish: Bötom)	Karijoki		186	1,153	6.2
Karkkila (Swedish: Högfors)	Karkkila		242	8,434	34.8
Karstula	Karstula		887	3,556	4.0
Karvia	Karvia		502	2,166	4.3
Kaskinen (Swedish: Kaskö)	Kaskinen		11	1,256	118.0
Kauhajoki	Kauhajoki		1,299	12,501	9.6
Kauhava	Kauhava		1,314	15,043	11.4
Kauniainen (Swedish: Grankulla)	Kauniainen		6	10,176	1,727.7
Kaustinen (Swedish: Kaustby)	Kaustinen		354	4,121	11.6
Keitele	Keitele		483	1,966	4.1
Kemi	Kemi		95	19,418	203.6
Kemijärvi	Kemijärvi		3,504	6,937	2.0
Keminmaa	Keminmaa (Laurila)		627	7,579	12.1
Kempele	Kempele station		110	19,673	178.6
Kerava (Swedish: Kervo)	Kerava		31	38,461	1,255.7
Keuruu (Swedish: Keuru)	Keuruu		1,258	9,101	7.2
Kihniö	Kihniö		357	1,689	4.7
Kimitoön (Finnish: Kemiönsaari)	Kimito		687	6,350	9.2
Kinnula	Kinnula		460	1,495	3.2
Kirkkonummi (Swedish: Kyrkslätt)	Kirkkonummi		367	41,720	113.8
Kitee (Swedish: Kides)	Kitee		1,254	9,533	7.6
Kittilä	Kittilä		8,095	6,861	0.8
Kiuruvesi	Kiuruvesi		1,328	7,339	5.5
Kivijärvi	Kivijärvi		484	1,008	2.1
Kokemäki (Swedish: Kumo)	Kokemäki		480	6,670	13.9
Kokkola (Swedish: Karleby)	Kokkola		1,446	48,367	33.4
Kolari	Kolari		2,559	4,010	1.6
Konnevesi	Konnevesi		513	2,428	4.7
Kontiolahti (Swedish: Kontiolax)	Kontiolahti		800	15,062	18.8
Korsholm (Finnish: Mustasaari)	Smedsby		849	19,750	23.2
Korsnäs	Korsnäs		236	1,983	8.4
Koski Tl (Swedish: Koskis)	Koski		192	2,193	11.5
Kotka	Kotka		272	50,196	184.5
Kouvola	Kouvola		2,558	78,228	30.6
Kristinestad (Finnish: Kristiinankaupunki)	Kristinestad		683	6,121	9.0
Kronoby (Finnish: Kruunupyy)	Kronoby		713	6,327	8.9
Kuhmo	Kuhmo		4,807	7,448	1.5
Kuhmoinen (Swedish: Kuhmois)	Kuhmoinen		661	2,033	3.1
Kumlinge	Kumlinge		99	272	2.7
Kuopio	Kuopio		3,242	125,666	38.8
Kuortane	Kuortane		462	3,332	7.2
Kurikka	Kurikka		1,725	19,501	11.3
Kustavi (Swedish: Gustavs)	Kustavi		166	952	5.7
Kuusamo	Kuusamo		4,979	14,880	3.0
Kyyjärvi	Kyyjärvi (Nopola)		448	1,151	2.6
Kärkölä	Järvelä		257	4,085	15.9
Kärsämäki	Kärsämäki		697	2,361	3.4
Kökar	Kökar (Karlby)		64	224	3.5
Lahti (Swedish: Lahtis)	Lahti		460	121,386	264.2
Laihia (Swedish: Laihela)	Laihia		505	7,647	15.1
Laitila (Swedish: Letala)	Laitila		532	8,488	16.0
Lapinjärvi (Swedish: Lappträsk)	Lapinjärvi		330	2,421	7.3
Lapinlahti	Lapinlahti		1,097	8,881	8.1
Lappajärvi	Lappajärvi		421	2,739	6.5
Lappeenranta (Swedish: Villmanstrand)	Lappeenranta		1,434	73,320	51.1
Lapua (Swedish: Lappo)	Lapua		737	14,028	19.0
Larsmo (Finnish: Luoto)	Larsmo (Holm)		143	5,889	41.3
Laukaa (Swedish: Laukas)	Laukaa		649	18,840	29.1
Lemi	Lemi		218	2,867	13.2
Lemland	Lemland (Söderby)		113	2,133	18.8
Lempäälä	Lempäälä		270	24,952	92.6
Leppävirta	Leppävirta		1,136	8,971	7.9
Lestijärvi	Lestijärvi		480	661	1.4
Lieksa	Lieksa		3,418	10,009	2.9
Lieto (Swedish: Lundo)	Lieto		301	20,687	68.8
Liminka (Swedish: Limingo)	Liminka		637	10,185	16.0
Liperi (Swedish: Libelits)	Liperi		727	11,939	16.4
Lohja (Swedish: Lojo)	Lohja		940	45,648	48.6
Loimaa	Loimaa		848	15,265	18.0
Loppi	Loppi		598	7,638	12.8
Loviisa (Swedish: Lovisa)	Loviisa		820	14,334	17.5
Luhanka	Luhanka		215	700	3.3
Lumijoki	Lumijoki		214	2,008	9.4
Lumparland	Lumparland (Klemetsby)		36	367	10.1
Luumäki	Taavetti		750	4,330	5.8
Malax (Finnish: Maalahti)	Malax		522	5,415	10.4
Mariehamn (Finnish: Maarianhamina)	Mariehamn		12	11,861	1,004.3
Marttila (Swedish: S:t Mårtens)	Marttila		195	1,907	9.8
Masku	Masku		175	9,635	55.1
Merijärvi	Merijärvi		230	1,048	4.6
Merikarvia (Swedish: Sastmola)	Merikarvia		446	2,888	6.5
Miehikkälä	Miehikkälä		423	1,696	4.0
Mikkeli (Swedish: S:t Michel)	Mikkeli		2,548	51,828	20.3
Muhos	Muhos		785	8,734	11.1
Multia	Multia		733	1,393	1.9
Muonio	Muonio		1,904	2,326	1.2
Muurame	Muurame		144	10,628	73.8
Mynämäki (Swedish: Virmo)	Mynämäki		520	7,464	14.4
Myrskylä (Swedish: Mörskom)	Myrskylä		200	1,683	8.4
Mäntsälä	Mäntsälä		581	20,914	36.0
Mänttä-Vilppula	Mänttä		535	9,237	17.3
Mäntyharju	Mäntyharju		981	7,056	7.2
Naantali (Swedish: Nådendal)	Naantali		313	20,190	64.6
Nakkila	Nakkila		183	4,929	26.9
Nivala	Nivala		527	10,389	19.7
Nokia	Nokia		288	36,267	125.8
Nousiainen (Swedish: Nousis)	Nousiainen (Nummi)		199	4,676	23.5
Nurmes	Nurmes		2,401	8,914	3.7
Nurmijärvi	Nurmijärvi		362	45,177	124.8
Nykarleby (Finnish: Uusikaarlepyy)	Nykarleby		733	7,445	10.2
Närpes (Finnish: Närpiö)	Närpes		978	9,562	9.8
Orimattila	Orimattila		785	15,658	19.9
Oripää	Oripää		118	1,307	11.1
Orivesi	Orivesi		800	8,827	11.0
Oulainen	Oulainen		588	6,911	11.8
Oulu (Swedish: Uleåborg)	Oulu		2,972	216,352	72.8
Outokumpu	Outokumpu		446	6,418	14.4
Padasjoki	Padasjoki		523	2,672	5.1
Paimio (Swedish: Pemar)	Paimio (Vista)		239	11,237	47.1
Paltamo	Paltamo		919	2,989	3.3
Pargas (Finnish: Parainen)	Pargas		884	14,829	16.8
Parikkala	Parikkala		592	4,282	7.2
Parkano	Parkano		853	6,055	7.1
Pedersöre (Finnish: Pedersören kunta)	Bennäs		794	11,272	14.2
Pelkosenniemi	Pelkosenniemi		1,836	921	0.5
Pello	Pello		1,738	3,190	1.8
Perho	Perho		748	2,583	3.5
Petäjävesi	Petäjävesi		456	3,551	7.8
Pieksämäki	Pieksämäki		1,569	17,186	11.0
Pielavesi	Pielavesi		1,153	3,963	3.4
Pihtipudas	Pihtipudas		1,075	3,684	3.4
Pirkkala (Swedish: Birkala)	Pirkkala (Naistenmatka)		81	21,094	259.1
Polvijärvi	Polvijärvi		805	3,979	4.9
Pomarkku (Swedish: Påmark)	Pomarkku		301	1,933	6.4
Pori (Swedish: Björneborg)	Pori		1,156	83,226	72.0
Pornainen (Swedish: Borgnäs)	Pornainen (Kirveskoski)		147	4,948	33.8
Porvoo (Swedish: Borgå)	Porvoo		655	51,758	79.1
Posio	Posio (Ahola)		3,040	2,874	0.9
Pudasjärvi	Pudasjärvi (Kurenalus)		5,639	7,289	1.3
Pukkila	Pukkila		145	1,739	12.0
Punkalaidun	Punkalaidun		361	2,615	7.2
Puolanka	Puolanka		2,461	2,336	0.9
Puumala	Puumala		794	2,083	2.6
Pyhtää (Swedish: Pyttis)	Siltakylä		325	5,017	15.5
Pyhäjoki	Pyhäjoki		543	2,985	5.5
Pyhäjärvi	Pyhäsalmi		1,310	4,677	3.6
Pyhäntä	Pyhäntä		810	1,650	2.0
Pyhäranta	Pyhäranta		144	1,926	13.4
Pälkäne	Pälkäne (Onkkaala)		561	6,224	11.1
Pöytyä	Kyrö and Riihikoski		750	7,984	10.6
Raahe (Swedish: Brahestad)	Raahe		1,014	23,540	23.2
Raisio (Swedish: Reso)	Raisio		49	25,817	529.5
Rantasalmi	Rantasalmi		560	3,235	5.8
Ranua	Ranua		3,454	3,563	1.0
Raseborg (Finnish: Raasepori)	Ekenäs		1,149	26,982	23.5
Rauma (Swedish: Raumo)	Rauma		496	39,031	78.6
Rautalampi	Rautalampi		539	2,925	5.4
Rautavaara	Rautavaara		1,151	1,402	1.2
Rautjärvi	Simpele		351	2,983	8.5
Reisjärvi	Reisjärvi		474	2,541	5.4
Riihimäki	Riihimäki		121	28,619	236.5
Ristijärvi	Ristijärvi		836	1,164	1.4
Rovaniemi	Rovaniemi		7,582	65,881	8.7
Ruokolahti (Swedish: Ruokolax)	Ruokolahti (Rasila)		942	4,719	5.0
Ruovesi	Ruovesi		777	4,023	5.2
Rusko	Rusko		127	6,402	50.3
Rääkkylä	Rääkkylä		428	1,864	4.4
Saarijärvi	Saarijärvi		1,252	8,835	7.1
Salla	Salla		5,730	3,267	0.6
Salo	Salo		1,987	50,785	25.6
Saltvik	Ödkarby and Nääs		152	1,770	11.6
Sastamala	Sastamala (Vammala)		1,429	23,474	16.4
Sauvo (Swedish: Sagu)	Sauvo		253	2,953	11.7
Savitaipale	Savitaipale		539	3,162	5.9
Savonlinna (Swedish: Nyslott)	Savonlinna		2,238	31,321	14.0
Savukoski	Savukoski		6,440	973	0.2
Seinäjoki	Seinäjoki		1,432	66,738	46.6
Sievi	Sievi		786	4,638	5.9
Siikainen (Swedish: Siikais)	Siikainen		463	1,257	2.7
Siikajoki	Ruukki		1,055	4,797	4.5
Siikalatva	Pulkkila		2,173	4,901	2.3
Siilinjärvi	Siilinjärvi		401	21,380	53.3
Simo	Simo		1,446	2,769	1.9
Sipoo (Swedish: Sibbo)	Nikkilä		340	22,889	67.4
Siuntio (Swedish: Sjundeå)	Siuntio		241	6,199	25.7
Sodankylä (Northern Sami: Soađegilli)	Sodankylä		11,693	8,084	0.7
Soini	Soini		552	1,799	3.3
Somero	Somero		668	8,420	12.6
Sonkajärvi	Sonkajärvi		1,466	3,555	2.4
Sotkamo	Sotkamo		2,649	10,173	3.8
Sottunga	Sottunga		28	106	3.8
Sulkava	Sulkava		584	2,339	4.0
Sund	Sund (Björby)		108	1,008	9.3
Suomussalmi	Suomussalmi (Ämmänsaari)		5,270	7,022	1.3
Suonenjoki	Suonenjoki		714	6,628	9.3
Sysmä	Sysmä		667	3,406	5.1
Säkylä	Säkylä		407	6,234	15.3
Taipalsaari	Taipalsaari		345	4,577	13.3
Taivalkoski	Taivalkoski		2,438	3,633	1.5
Taivassalo (Swedish: Tövsala)	Taivassalo		140	1,704	12.1
Tammela	Tammela		641	5,816	9.1
Tampere (Swedish: Tammerfors)	Tampere		525	260,455	496.2
Tervo	Tervo		348	1,394	4.0
Tervola	Tervola		1,560	2,829	1.8
Teuva (Swedish: Östermark)	Teuva		555	4,642	8.4
Tohmajärvi	Tohmajärvi (Kemie)		838	3,934	4.7
Toholampi	Toholampi		609	2,779	4.6
Toivakka	Toivakka		361	2,337	6.5
Tornio (Swedish: Torneå)	Tornio		1,189	20,912	17.6
Turku (Swedish: Åbo)	Turku		246	206,420	840.4
Tuusniemi	Tuusniemi		543	2,303	4.2
Tuusula (Swedish: Tusby)	Hyrylä		220	42,373	193.0
Tyrnävä	Tyrnävä		492	6,519	13.3
Ulvila (Swedish: Ulvsby)	Vanhakylä		401	12,326	30.8
Urjala	Urjala		476	4,522	9.5
Utajärvi	Utajärvi		1,669	2,460	1.5
Utsjoki (Northern Sami: Ohcejohka)	Utsjoki		5,147	1,130	0.2
Uurainen	Uurainen		348	3,662	10.5
Uusikaupunki (Swedish: Nystad)	Uusikaupunki		503	14,764	29.3
Vaala	Vaala		1,302	2,560	2.0
Vaasa (Swedish: Vasa)	Vaasa		365	70,312	192.7
Valkeakoski	Valkeakoski		272	20,818	76.5
Vantaa (Swedish: Vanda)	Tikkurila		238	251,936	1,056.9
Varkaus	Varkaus		386	19,617	50.9
Vehmaa (Swedish: Vemo)	Vinkkilä		189	2,245	11.9
Vesanto	Vesanto		423	1,839	4.4
Vesilahti	Vesilahti		301	4,513	15.0
Veteli (Swedish: Vetil)	Veteli		502	2,918	5.8
Vieremä	Vieremä		925	3,366	3.6
Vihti (Swedish: Vichtis)	Nummela		522	28,765	55.1
Viitasaari	Viitasaari		1,249	5,759	4.6
Vimpeli (Swedish: Vindala)	Vimpeli		287	2,603	9.1
Virolahti (Swedish: Vederlax)	Virojoki		372	2,818	7.6
Virrat (Swedish: Virdois)	Virrat		1,163	6,175	5.3
Vårdö	Vårdö		102	468	4.6
Vörå (Finnish: Vöyri)	Vörå		782	6,228	8.0
Ylitornio (Swedish: Övertorneå)	Ylitornio		2,029	3,700	1.8
Ylivieska	Ylivieska		570	15,407	27.0
Ylöjärvi	Ylöjärvi		1,116	33,715	30.2
Ypäjä	Ypäjä		183	2,181	11.9
Ähtäri (Swedish: Etseri)	Ähtäri		806	5,208	6.5
Äänekoski	Äänekoski		885	17,655	20.0
