= August Raatikainen =

Finnish politician

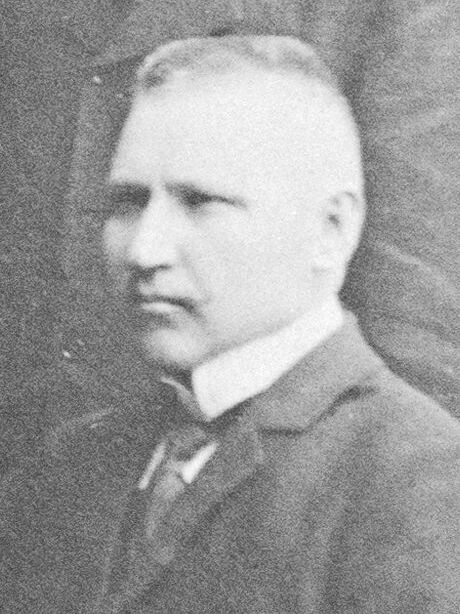
August Raatikainen in 1907

August Raatikainen (23 September 1874, Rautalampi – 26 October 1937) was a Finnish farmer and politician. He served as Minister of Agriculture from 4 July 1930 to 21 March 1931 and as a Member of the Parliament of Finland from 1907 to 1908, from 1909 to 1910, from 1916 to 1917, from 1918 to 1922 and from 1924 to 1933, representing the Agrarian League.
