= Helka Hynninen =

Finnish singer and songwriter

Helka Hynninen (May 21, 1930, in Vesanto – May 29, 2017, in Mikkeli) was a Finnish singer and songwriter, who was also a farmer in Mikkeli. She was not nationally known before 1976, but in her home region, Vesanto, she had been known for decades as a good singer. In the summer of 1980, Hynninen's career took a new turn when she performed for Finnish-Americans in Lake Worth, Florida. She performed in the United States dozens of times and appeared in Finland Society at the invitation the Atlanta Summer Olympics in 1996.

Hynninen's most popular song Lapsuusajan maisemissa, (English: "Landscapes of childhood") was written in 1976.

== Discography ==
- Helka Hynninen Hiirolasta, (1976)
- Vanhan pirtin tarina, (1978)
- Hiljaisin hetkin, (1978)
- Tyttären valssi, (1981)
- Vain yhden elämän, (1984)
- Nuoruuden rakkaus, (1987)
- Askeleet kuun sillalla, (1997)
- Muistoja lapsuudenkodista, (1999)
