= Konnevesi =

- Municipality
- Konneveden kunta Konnevesi kommun
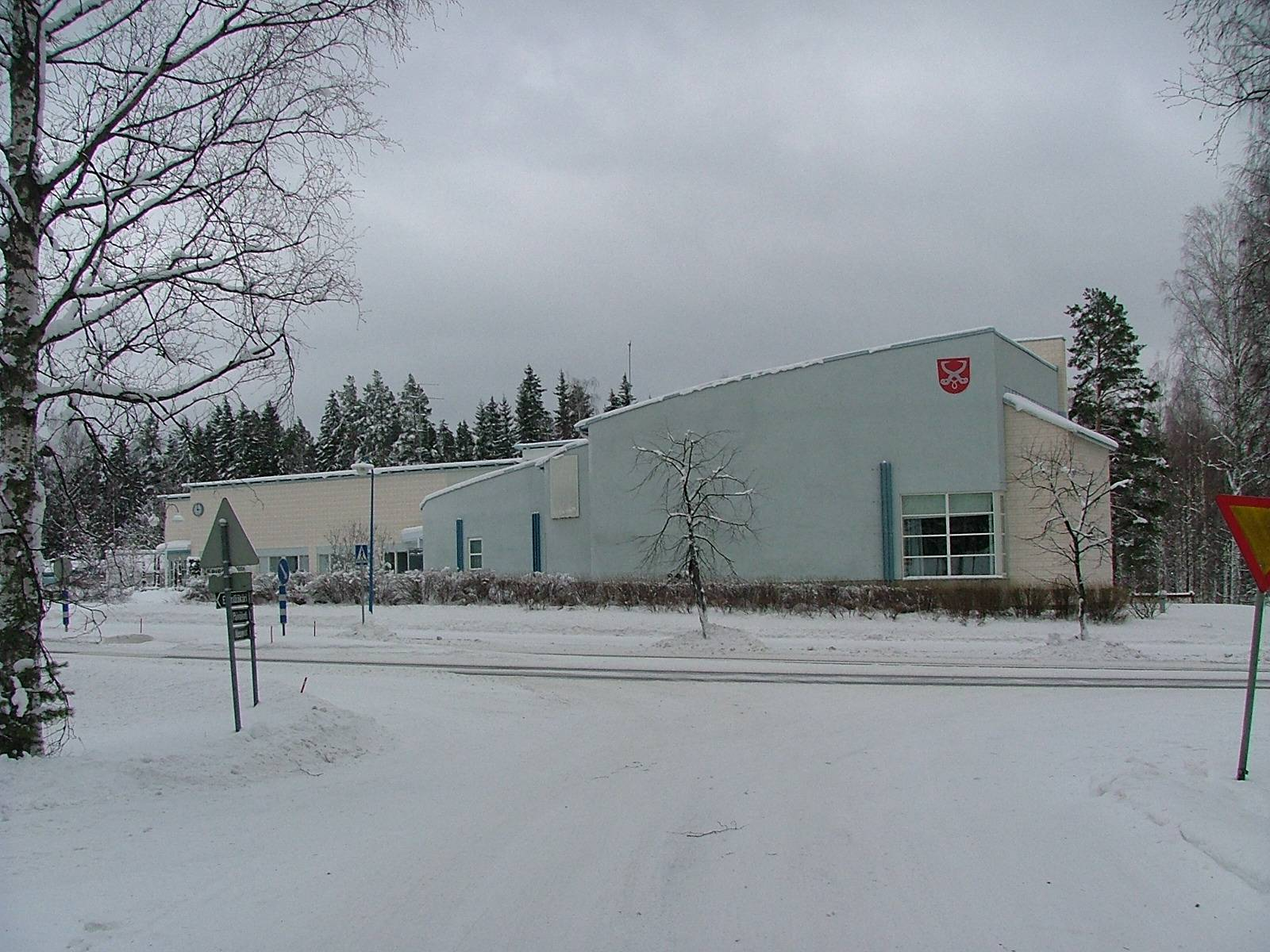
- The municipal house of Konnevesi

- Coat of arms

- Location of Konnevesi in Finland
- Interactive map of Konnevesi
- Coordinates: 62°37.7′N 026°17′E
- Country: Finland
- Region: Central Finland
- Sub-region: Äänekoski
- Charter: 1922

Government
  - Municipal manager: Kari Levänen

Area (2018-01-01)
  - Total: 680.85 km^{2} (262.88 sq mi)
  - Land: 512.94 km^{2} (198.05 sq mi)
  - Water: 167.95 km^{2} (64.85 sq mi)
  - Rank: 171st largest in Finland

Population (2025-12-31)
  - Total: 2,404
  - Rank: 236th largest in Finland
  - Density: 4.69/km^{2} (12.1/sq mi)

Population by native language
  - Finnish: 97.6% (official)
  - Others: 2.4%

Population by age
  - 0 to 14: 12.6%
  - 15 to 64: 53.1%
  - 65 or older: 34.2%
- Time zone: UTC+02:00 (EET)
  - Summer (DST): UTC+03:00 (EEST)
- Website: konnevesi.fi

Konnevesi is a municipality of Finland. It is located in the former province of Western Finland and is part of the Central Finland region. The municipality has a population of 2,404 (31 December 2025) and covers an area of 680.85 square kilometres (262.88 sq mi) of which 167.95 km^{2} (64.85 sq mi), or almost 25%, is water. Neighbouring municipalities are Hankasalmi, Laukaa, Rautalampi, Vesanto and Äänekoski. The municipality is unilingually Finnish.

There are altogether exactly 100 lakes in Konnevesi. The biggest lakes are Keitele, Lake Konnevesi and Liesvesi. The population density is 4.69 inhabitants per square kilometre (12.1/sq mi).

The logging tongs appearing in Konnevesi's coat of arms refer to local forestry. The coat of arms was designed by Gustaf von Numers, and the Konnevesi municipal council approved it in its meetings on 23 April 1964. The Ministry of the Interior approved the coat of arms for use on 21 August that year.

== History ==
The toponym Konnevesi was first mentioned in 1554 as Konnevessij äremarch. The name is derived from the lake Konnevesi, which in turn likely refers to a Sámic word meaning "deer" (reconstructed proto-Sámic *kontē).

Konnevesi was separated from Rautalampi in 1922. A municipal merger with Laukaa was planned in 2012, but was not accepted by the municipal government of Konnevesi.

== Villages ==
- Aholankylä
- Alakylä
- Alkula
- Heikkilä
- Hiekkalankylä
- Hytölä
- Hänniskylä
- Ilomäki
- Ilvesaho
- Istunmäki
- Itikkakylä
- Itäsaari
- Jokijärvi
- Jouhtikylä
- Kangasharju
- Kangaskylä
- Kivisalmi
- Kyönälänkylä
- Kärkkäiskylä (Kirkonkylä)
- Lahdenkylä
- Lapunmäki
- Leskelänkylä
- Lummukankylä
- Mäkäräniemi
- Pesiäissalmi
- Pukara
- Pukaranranta
- Pyhälahti
- Pyydyskylä
- Rappaatlahti
- Rinteenmäki
- Rokkapohja
- Rossinkylä
- Ruuskankylä
- Salmenkylä
- Sauvoniemi
- Siikakoski
- Silmutjoki
- Sirkkamäki
- Suokylä
- Sydänmaankylä
- Särkisalo
- Tankolampi
- Toikkalankylä
- Töhkerönmäki
- Uurapohja
- Varuskunta
- Välimäki

== Dialect ==
The dialect of Konnevesi is a Savonian dialect. The dialect is transitional between the Central Finnish and Northern Savonian subgroups, with the speech of the western villages having more Central Finnish features while the speech in the eastern villages (such as Mäkäräniemi) is closer to the Northern Savonian dialects.

== Notable individuals ==
- Juha Karjalainen, former soccer player
- Miika Lahti, ice hockey player

== Gallery ==
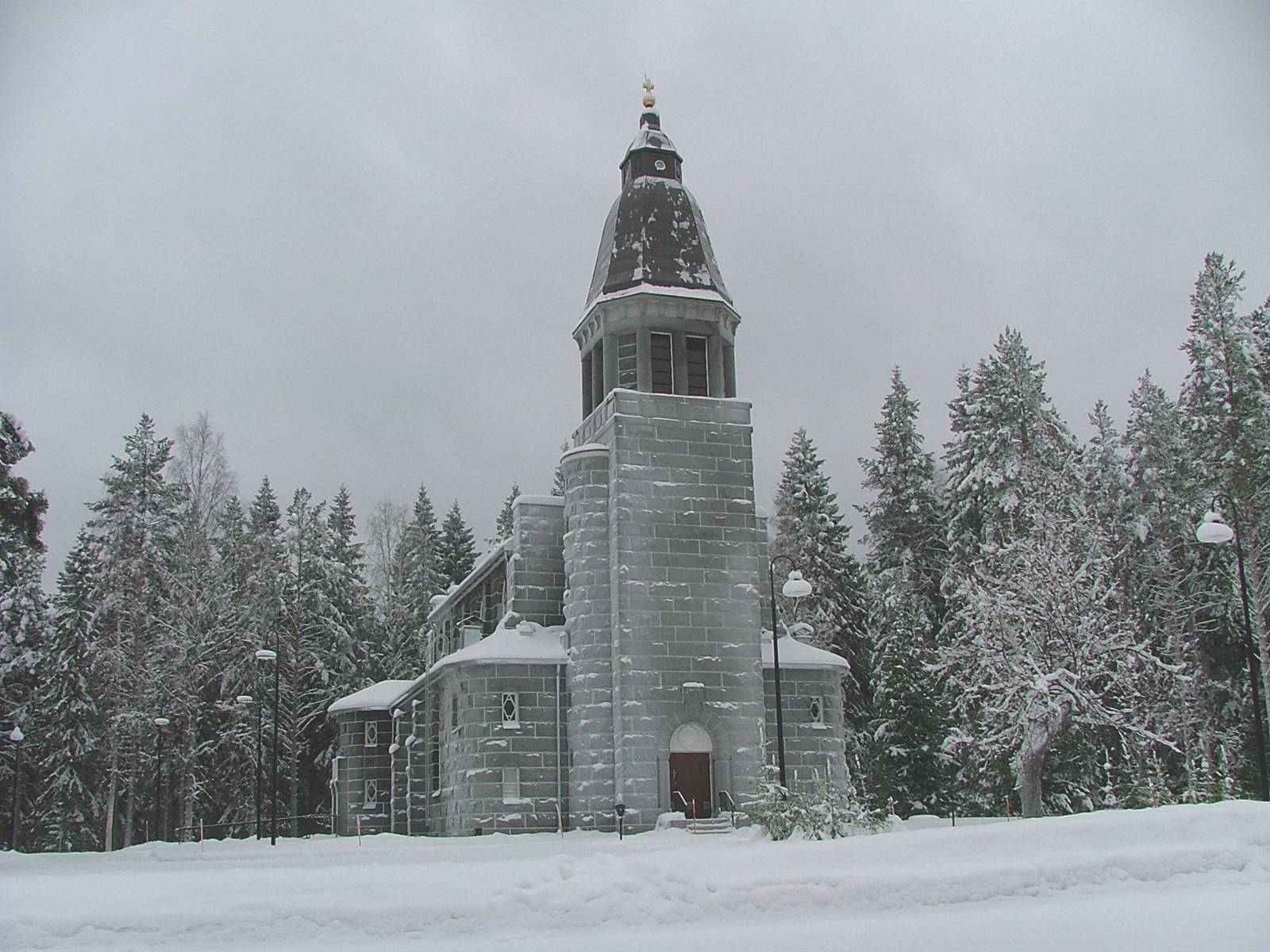
Konnevesi Church

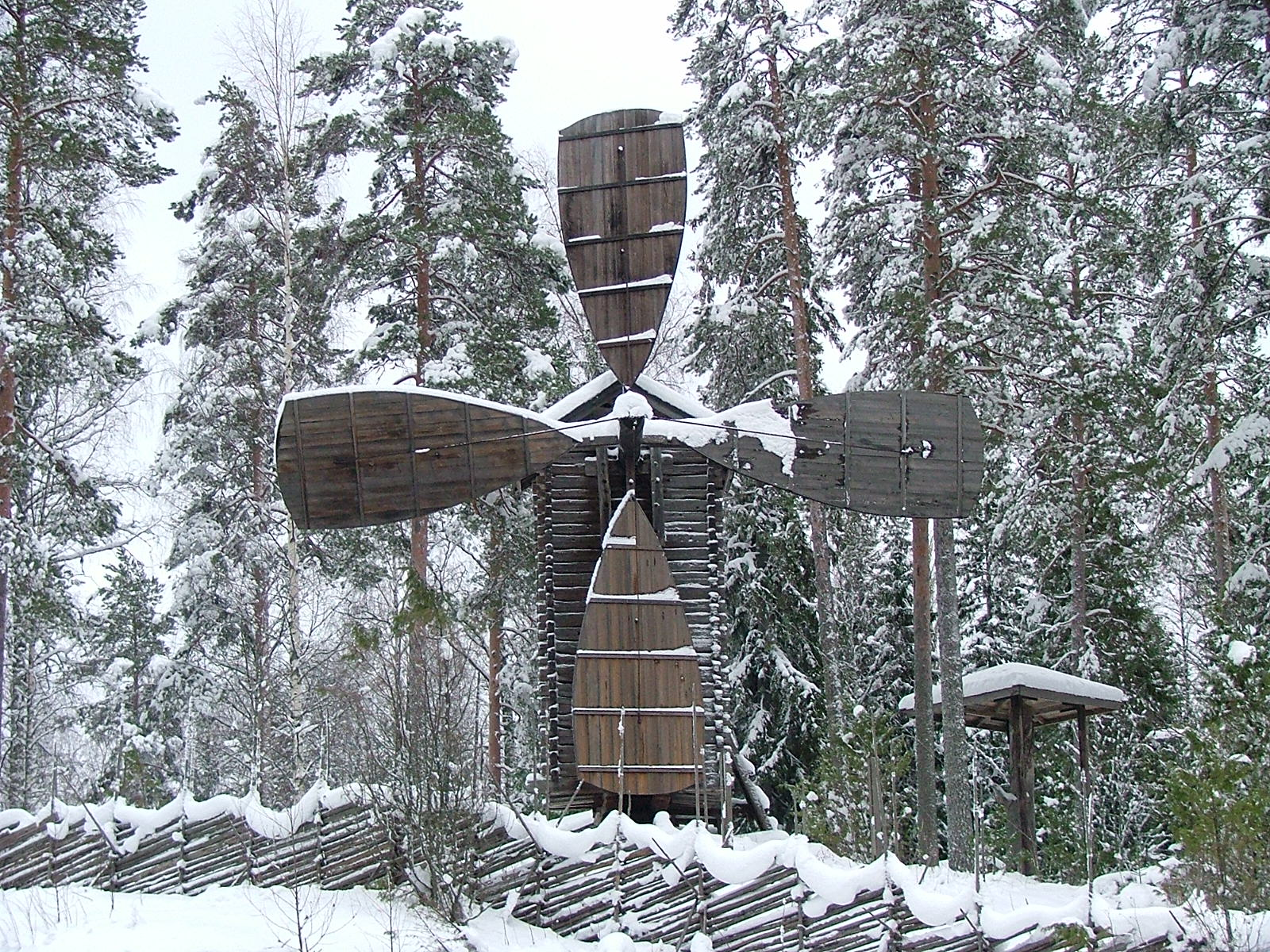
A windmill at Konnevesi Museum

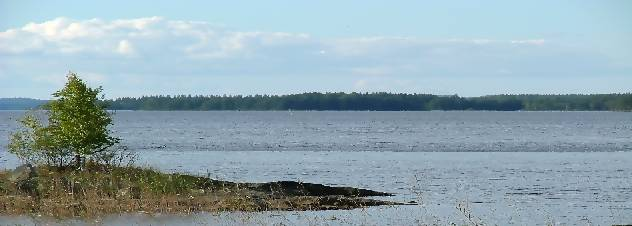
Lake Keitele in Konnevesi

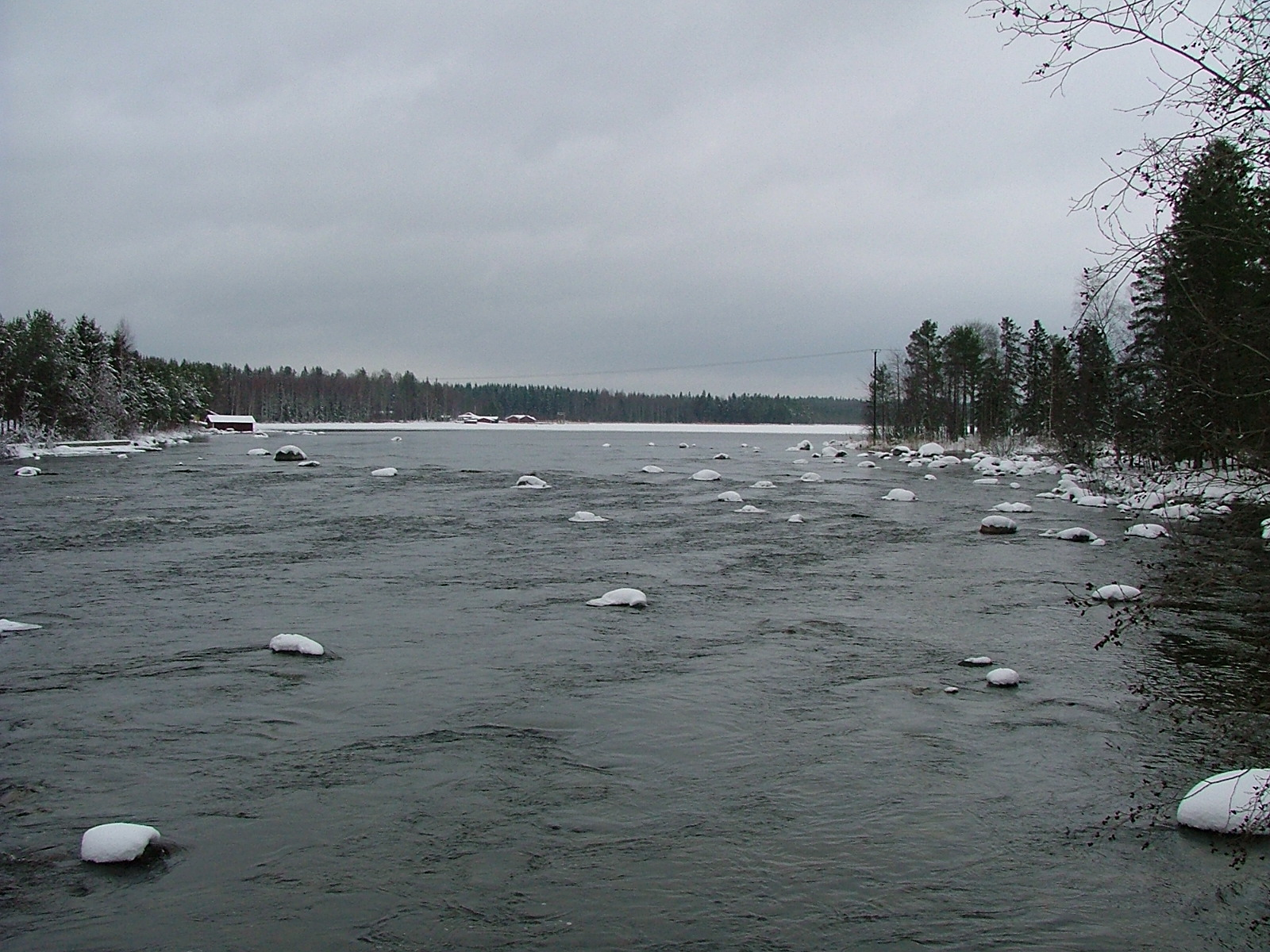
Siikakoski rapid

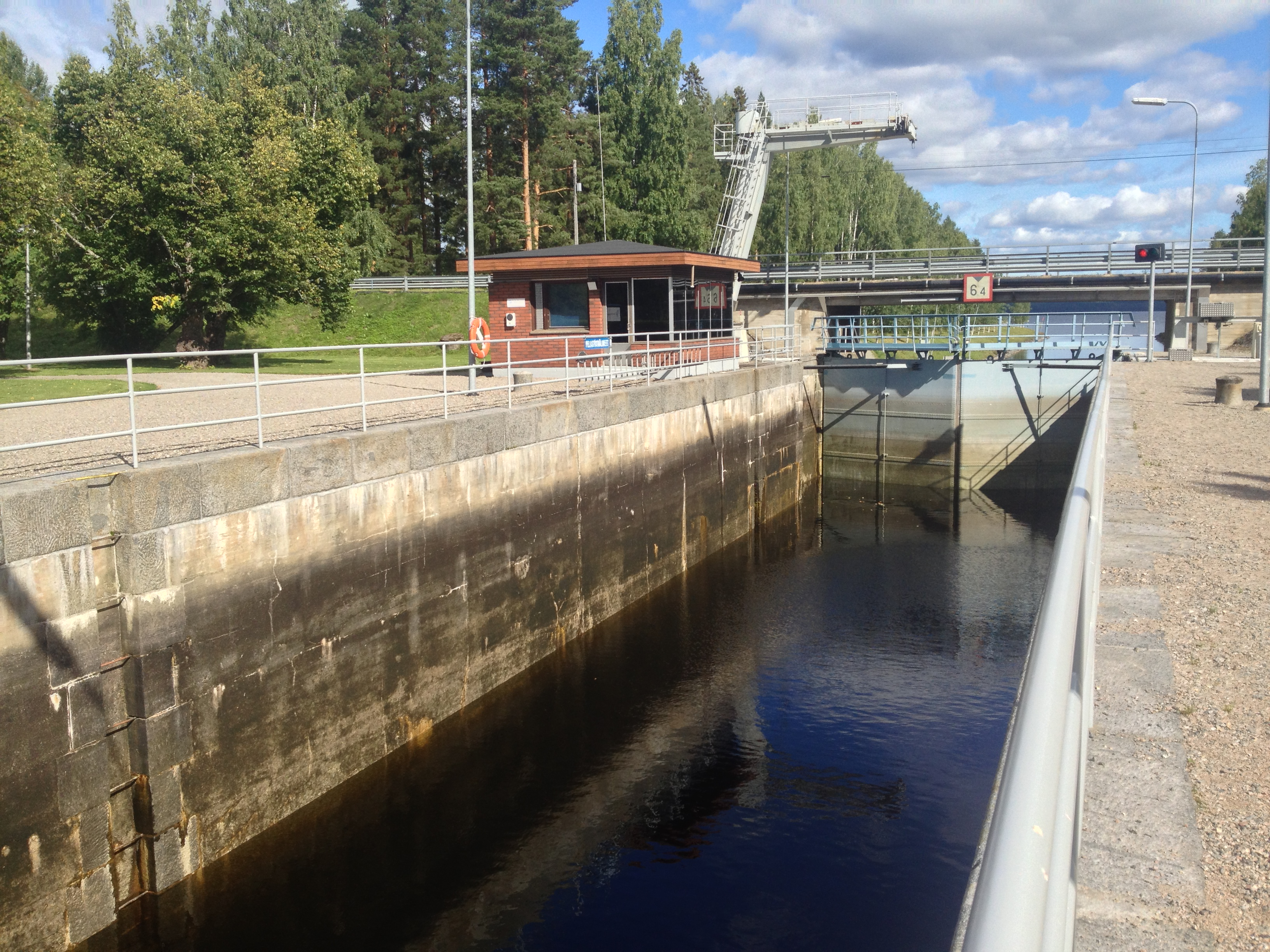
Neituri canal

== See also ==
- Finnish national road 69
