= Tervo =

Municipality in North Savo, Finland

- Municipality
- Tervon kunta Tervo kommun
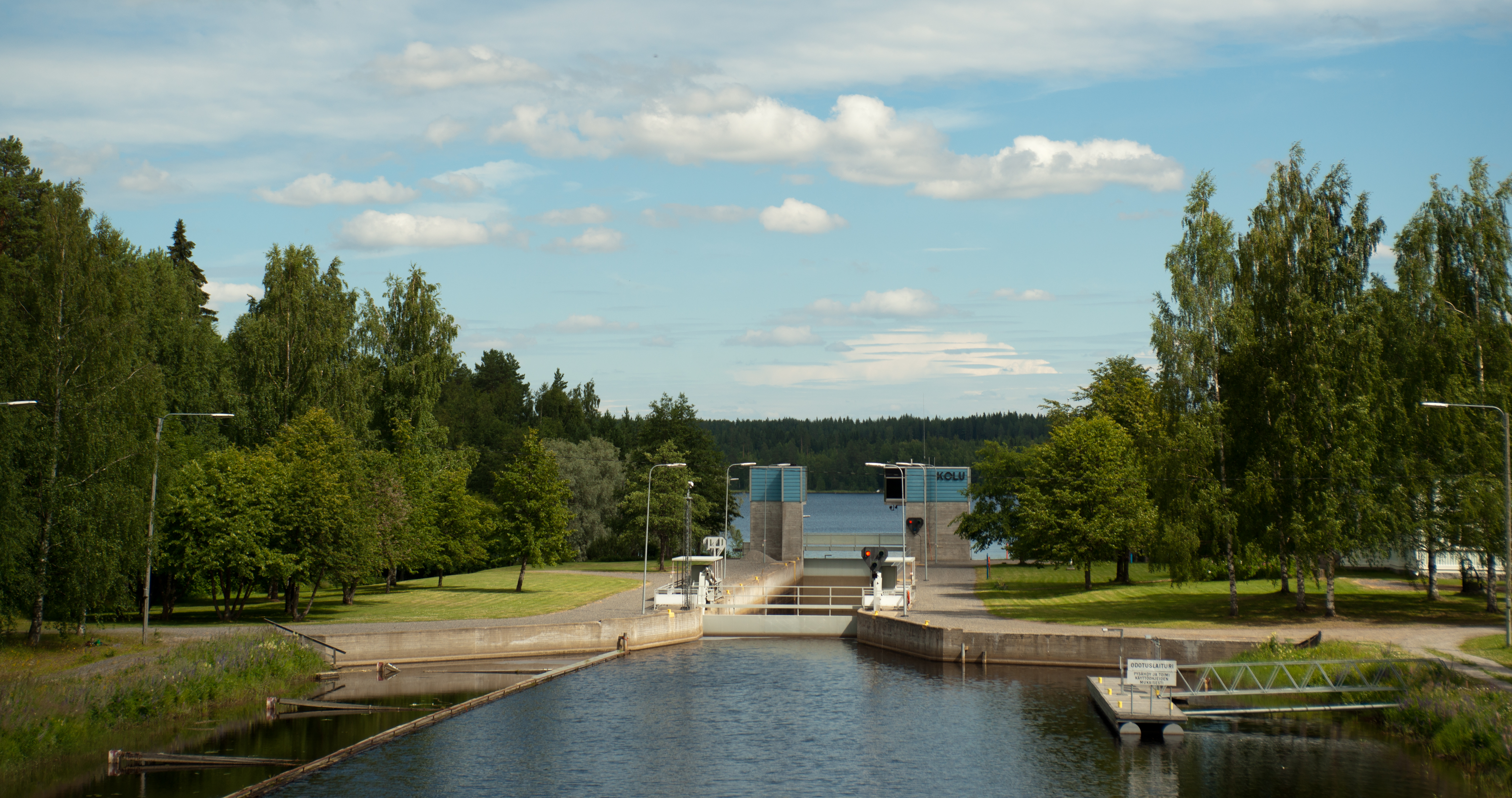
- Kolu canal

- Coat of arms

- Location of Tervo in Finland
- Interactive map of Tervo
- Coordinates: 62°57′20″N 026°45′20″E
- Country: Finland
- Region: North Savo
- Sub-region: Inner Savo
- Charter: 1926

Government
  - Municipal manager: Olli-Pekka Salminen

Area (2018-01-01)
  - Total: 494.30 km^{2} (190.85 sq mi)
  - Land: 347.75 km^{2} (134.27 sq mi)
  - Water: 146.52 km^{2} (56.57 sq mi)
  - Rank: 222nd largest in Finland

Population (2025-12-31)
  - Total: 1,388
  - Rank: 279th largest in Finland
  - Density: 3.99/km^{2} (10.3/sq mi)

Population by native language
  - Finnish: 97.4% (official)
  - Others: 2.6%

Population by age
  - 0 to 14: 9.2%
  - 15 to 64: 51.6%
  - 65 or older: 39.2%
- Time zone: UTC+02:00 (EET)
  - Summer (DST): UTC+03:00 (EEST)
- Website: www.tervo.fi

Tervo is a municipality of Finland. It is located in the former province of Eastern Finland and is part of the North Savo region. The municipality has a population of 1,388 (31 December 2025), making it North Savo's least populous municipality. It covers an area of 494.30 square kilometres (190.85 sq mi) of which 30%, or 146.52 km^{2} (56.57 sq mi), is water. The population density is 3.99 inhabitants per square kilometre (10.3/sq mi).

Neighbouring municipalities are Keitele, Kuopio, Maaninka, Pielavesi, Rautalampi, Suonenjoki, and Vesanto. Summer cottages are as prevalent as households. The municipality is unilingually Finnish.

== See also ==
- Finnish regional road 551
