= Kalle Matilainen (politician) =

Finnish politician

Kalle Kustaa Matilainen (30 May 1903 – 20 March 1973) was a Finnish carpenter, metalworker and politician, born in Keitele. He was a member of the Parliament of Finland from 1956 to 1970, representing the Social Democratic Party of Finland (SDP).
