= Tyrnävä =

- Municipality
- Tyrnävän kunta Tyrnävä kommun
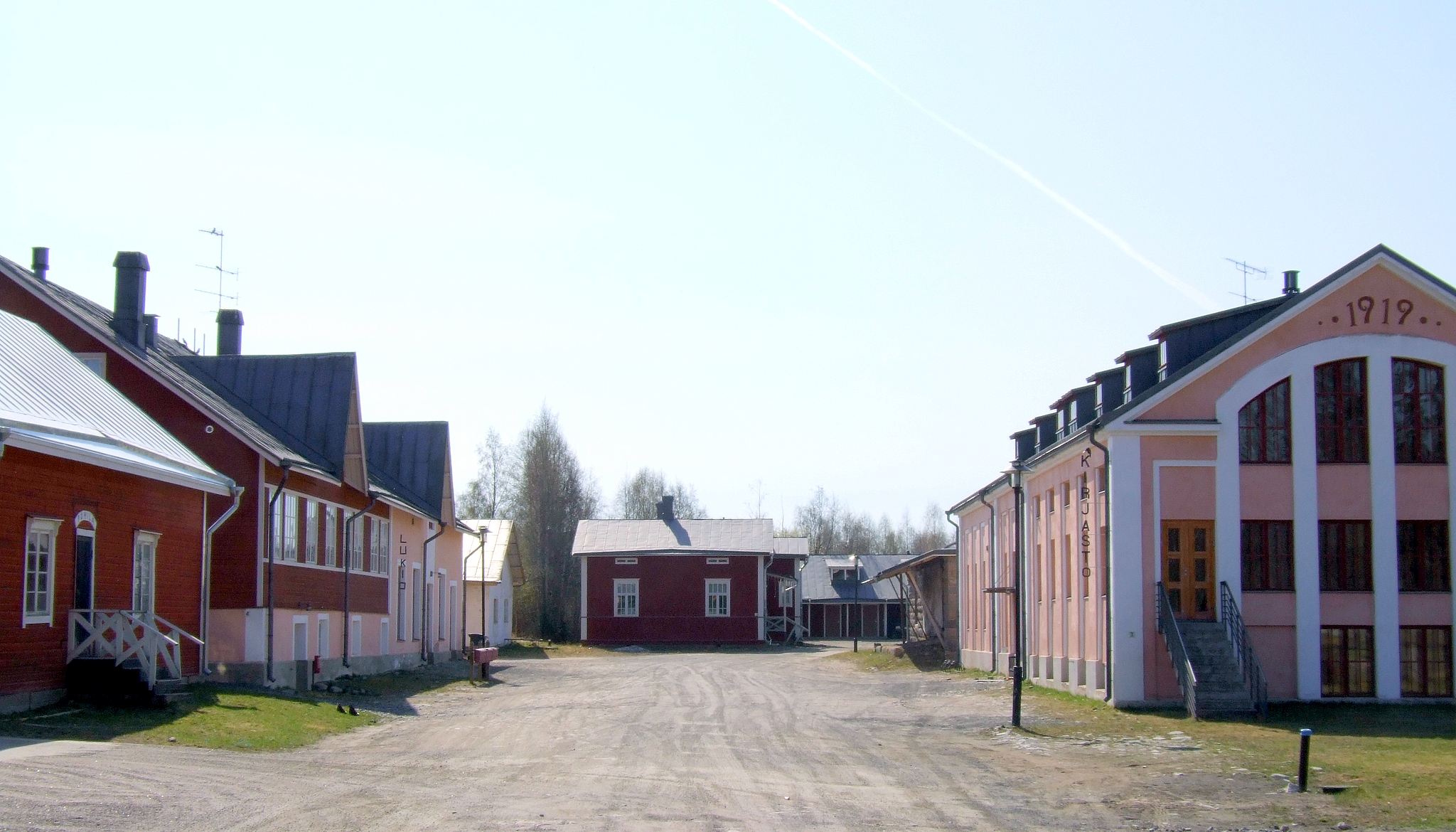
- Meijeritie Street in Tyrnävä village

- Coat of arms

- Location of Tyrnävä in Finland
- Interactive map of Tyrnävä
- Coordinates: 64°45′N 025°39′E
- Country: Finland
- Region: North Ostrobothnia
- Sub-region: Oulu sub-region
- Charter: 1865

Government
  - Municipal manager: Vesa Anttila

Area (2018-01-01)
  - Total: 494.85 km^{2} (191.06 sq mi)
  - Land: 491.82 km^{2} (189.89 sq mi)
  - Water: 3.07 km^{2} (1.19 sq mi)
  - Rank: 177th largest in Finland

Population (2025-12-31)
  - Total: 6,470
  - Rank: 140th largest in Finland
  - Density: 13.16/km^{2} (34.1/sq mi)

Population by native language
  - Finnish: 98.7% (official)
  - Swedish: 0.2%
  - Others: 1.1%

Population by age
  - 0 to 14: 30.8%
  - 15 to 64: 55.4%
  - 65 or older: 13.8%
- Time zone: UTC+02:00 (EET)
  - Summer (DST): UTC+03:00 (EEST)
- Website: www.tyrnava.fi

Tyrnävä (Finnish pronunciation: [ˈtyrnæʋæ]) is a municipality in the North Ostrobothnia region of Finland with a population of 6,470 (31 December 2025). It covers an area of 494.85 square kilometres (191.06 sq mi), of which 3.07 km^{2} (1.19 sq mi) is water. The population density is 13.16 inhabitants per square kilometre (34.1/sq mi). The municipality is unilingually Finnish. The city of Oulu is located about 30 kilometres (19 mi) north of the center of Tyrnävä.

The most important product of Tyrnävä is potatoes. The municipality has a lot of seed potato production, and the Tyrnävä's region is defined as one of the four high-quality seed potato growing areas in the European Union.

== Notable people ==
- Väinö Kirstinä (1936–2007)
