= Tuusniemi =

Municipality of North Savo, Finland

- Municipality
- Tuusniemen kunta Tuusniemi kommun
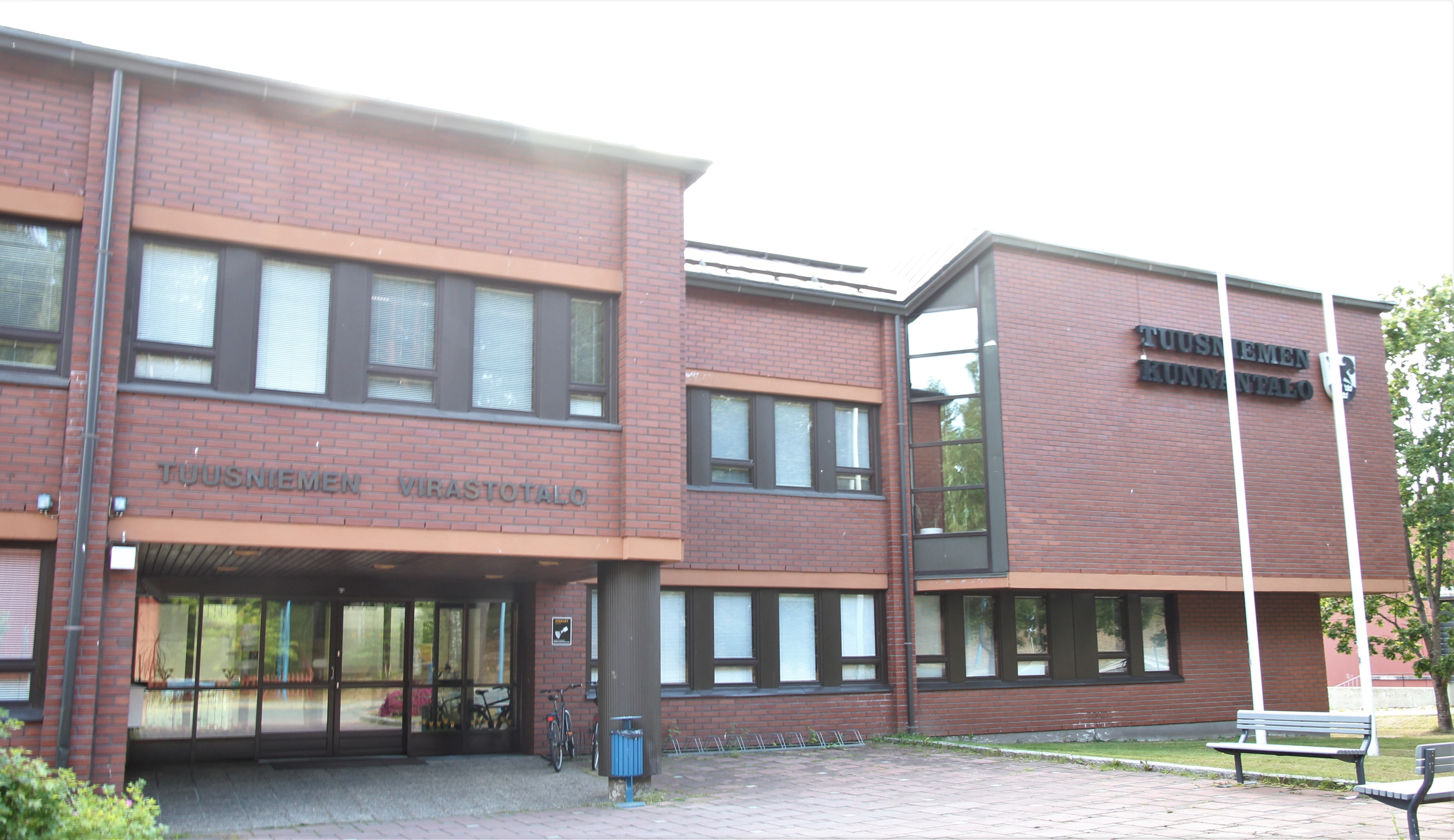
- Tuusniemi town hall

- Coat of arms

- Location of Tuusniemi in Finland
- Interactive map of Tuusniemi
- Coordinates: 62°48.5′N 028°29.5′E
- Country: Finland
- Region: North Savo
- Sub-region: North Eastern Savonia
- Charter: 1870

Government
  - Municipal manager: Timo Kiviluoma

Area (2018-01-01)
  - Total: 699.43 km^{2} (270.05 sq mi)
  - Land: 543.18 km^{2} (209.72 sq mi)
  - Water: 156.15 km^{2} (60.29 sq mi)
  - Rank: 157th largest in Finland

Population (2025-12-31)
  - Total: 2,270
  - Rank: 244th largest in Finland
  - Density: 4.18/km^{2} (10.8/sq mi)

Population by native language
  - Finnish: 97.4% (official)
  - Others: 2.6%

Population by age
  - 0 to 14: 10%
  - 15 to 64: 53.4%
  - 65 or older: 36.6%
- Time zone: UTC+02:00 (EET)
  - Summer (DST): UTC+03:00 (EEST)
- Website: www.tuusniemi.fi

Tuusniemi is a municipality of Finland. It is located in the North Savo region, 59 kilometres (37 mi) east of Kuopio. The municipality has a population of 2,270 (31 December 2025) and covers an area of 699.43 square kilometres (270.05 sq mi) of which 156.15 km^{2} (60.29 sq mi) is water. The population density is 4.18 inhabitants per square kilometre (10.8/sq mi)

Neighbour municipalities are Heinävesi, Juankoski, Kaavi, Kuopio, Leppävirta and Outokumpu.

The municipality is unilingually Finnish.

== Notable people ==
- Olli Miettinen (1869–1946) – politician
- Väinö Ikonen (1895–1954) – Greco-Roman wrestler and Olympian
- Antti Rissanen (born 1931) – sport shooter and Olympian
- Tuula Haatainen (born 1960) – politician
- Elisa Holopainen (born 2001) – ice hockey player and Olympic bronze medalist
