= Rautavaara =

- Municipality
- Rautavaaran kunta Rautavaara kommun
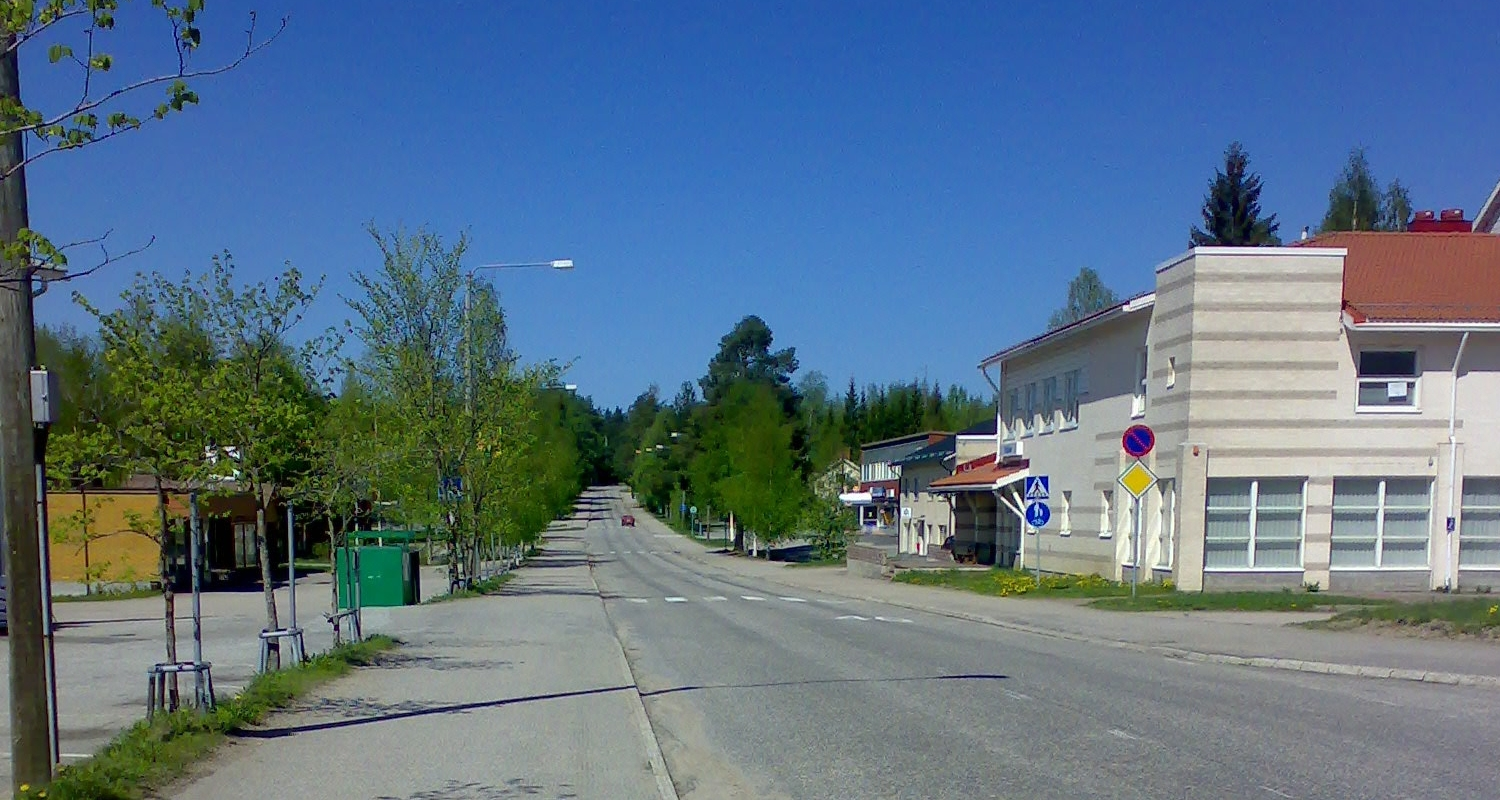
- Savontie road in Rautavaara

- Coat of arms

- Location of Rautavaara in Finland
- Interactive map of Rautavaara
- Coordinates: 63°29.7′N 028°18′E
- Country: Finland
- Region: North Savo
- Sub-region: Northeast Savo
- Charter: September 12, 1874

Government
  - Municipal manager: Mikko Kärnä

Area (2018-01-01)
  - Total: 1,235.26 km^{2} (476.94 sq mi)
  - Land: 1,150.63 km^{2} (444.26 sq mi)
  - Water: 84.09 km^{2} (32.47 sq mi)
  - Rank: 66th largest in Finland

Population (2025-12-31)
  - Total: 1,398
  - Rank: 278th largest in Finland
  - Density: 1.21/km^{2} (3.1/sq mi)

Population by native language
  - Finnish: 96.6% (official)
  - Others: 3.4%

Population by age
  - 0 to 14: 10.1%
  - 15 to 64: 50.9%
  - 65 or older: 39.1%
- Time zone: UTC+02:00 (EET)
  - Summer (DST): UTC+03:00 (EEST)
- Website: www.rautavaara.fi

Rautavaara is a municipality of Finland. It is located in the North Savo region. The municipality has a population of 1,398 (31 December 2025) and covers an area of 1,235.26 square kilometres (476.94 sq mi) of which 84.09 km^{2} (32.47 sq mi) is water. The population density is 1.21 inhabitants per square kilometre (3.1/sq mi). The municipality is unilingually Finnish.

Tiilikkajärvi National Park is located both in Rautavaara and its neighboring municipality Sotkamo.

Rautavaara is the first municipality in Finland to declare Savonian as an official language of the region alongside Standard Finnish.

== History ==
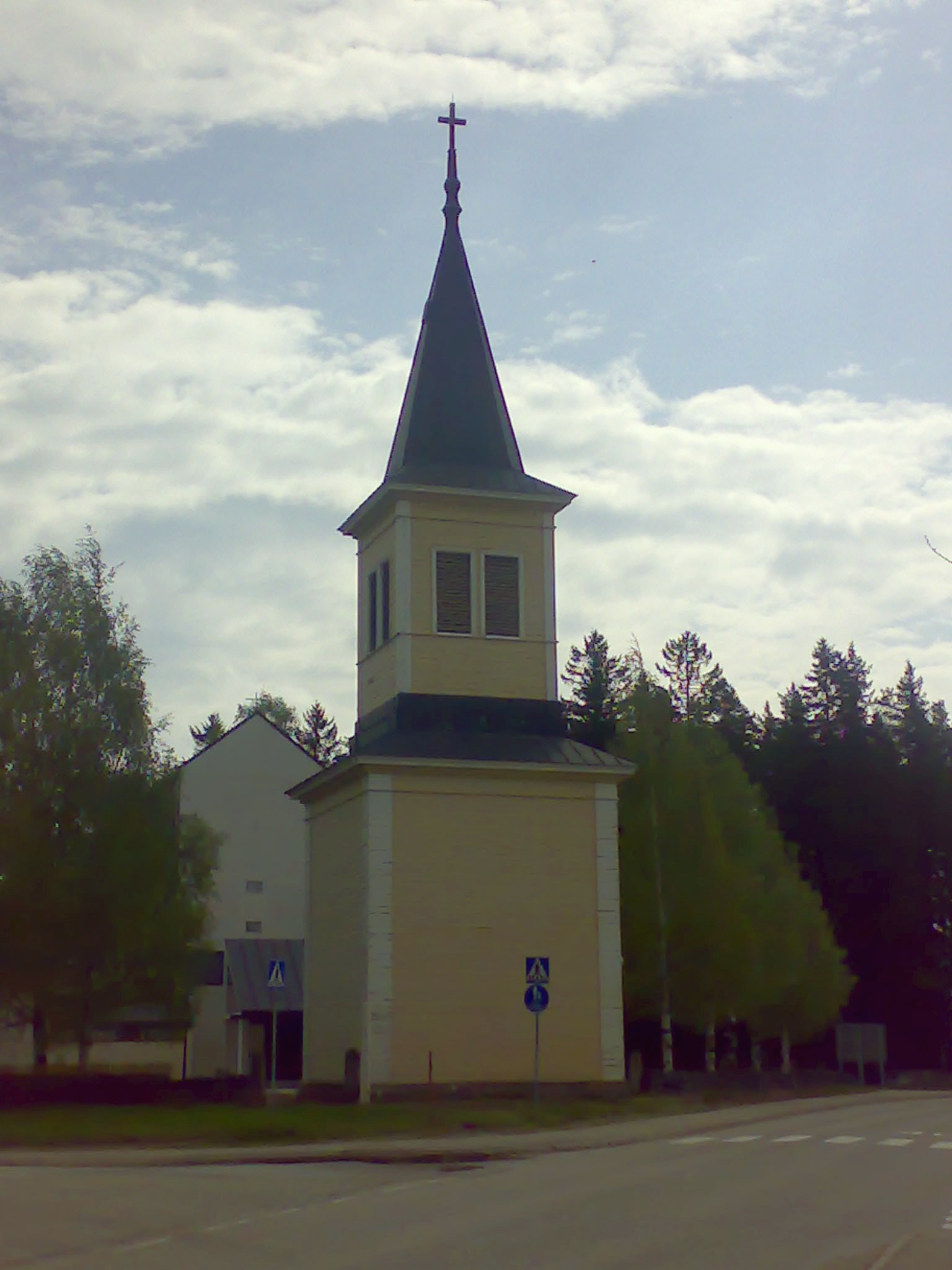
The belfry of Rautavaara

The municipality of Rautavaara was founded on 12 September 1874 and the parish in 1894.

== Villages ==
Alakeyritty, Ala-Luosta, Etelä-Keyritty, Halmejärvi, Hiirenjärvi, Kangaslahti, Lehtovaara, Lievisenmäki, Palojärvi, Pirttipuro, Pohjois-Keyritty, Puumala, Rannankylä, Rautavaara, Sierajärvi, Siikajärvi, Tiilikka, Ylä-Luosta.
