= Juho Heimonen =

Finnish politician

Juho Heimonen (14 July 1861 in Rautalampi – 11 October 1930) was a Finnish farmer and politician. He served as a Member of the Parliament of Finland from 1908 to 1909, representing the Agrarian League.
