= Pielavesi =

- Municipality
- Pielaveden kunta Pielavesi kommun
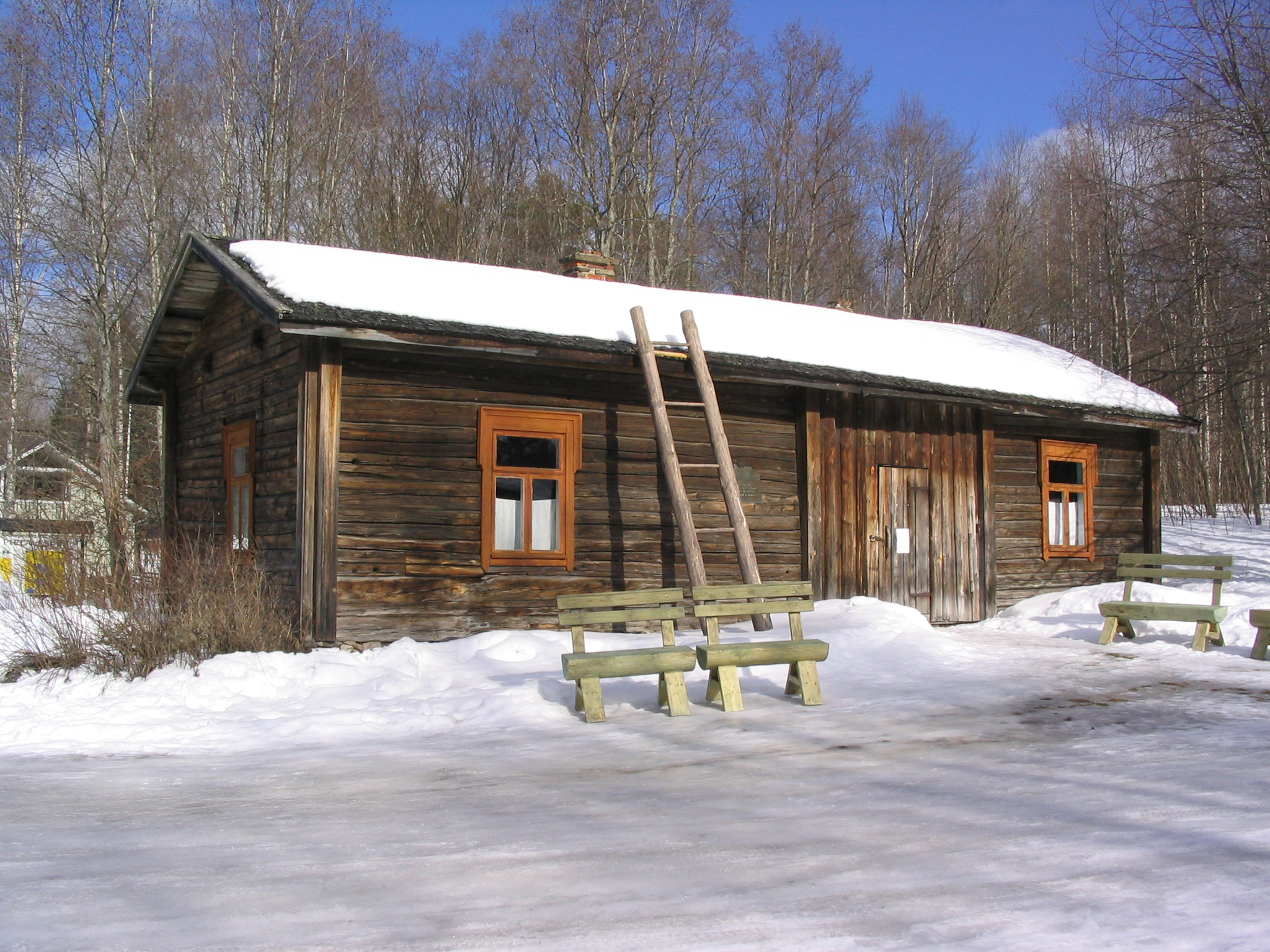
- Lepikon Torppa, the birthplace of Urho Kekkonen

- Coat of arms

- Location of Pielavesi in Finland
- Interactive map of Pielavesi
- Coordinates: 63°14′N 026°45.5′E
- Country: Finland
- Region: North Savo
- Sub-region: Upper Savo

Government
  - Municipal manager: Sami Miettinen (since 2010)

Area (2018-01-01)
  - Total: 1,406.51 km^{2} (543.06 sq mi)
  - Land: 1,153.23 km^{2} (445.26 sq mi)
  - Water: 253.27 km^{2} (97.79 sq mi)
  - Rank: 65th largest in Finland

Population (2025-12-31)
  - Total: 3,873
  - Rank: 194th largest in Finland
  - Density: 3.36/km^{2} (8.7/sq mi)

Population by native language
  - Finnish: 97.3% (official)
  - Swedish: 0.3%
  - Others: 2.4%

Population by age
  - 0 to 14: 13.5%
  - 15 to 64: 48.9%
  - 65 or older: 37.6%
- Time zone: UTC+02:00 (EET)
  - Summer (DST): UTC+03:00 (EEST)
- Website: pielavesi.fi/en/

Pielavesi (Finnish pronunciation: [ˈpie̯lɑˌʋesi]) is a municipality of Finland. It is part of the North Savo region. The municipality has a population of 3,873 (31 December 2025) and covers an area of 1,406.51 square kilometres (543.06 sq mi) of which 253.27 km^{2} (97.79 sq mi) is water. The population density is 3.36 inhabitants per square kilometre (8.7/sq mi). The municipality is unilingually Finnish.

The birchbark horns in the coat of arms are reminiscent of the times when they were used for signaling in a settlement that spread over large forest areas. They were also used to scare forest predators away from cattle while they were grazing in forest pastures. The golden trefoil crosses refers to the parts of three old church parishes that formed the Pielavesi parish. The coat of arms was designed by Ahti Hammar and Niilo Toikkanen, and was approved by the Pielavesi Municipal Council on July 26 and December 15, 1953. The Ministry of the Interior confirmed the coat of arms for use on January 23, 1954.

== Geography ==
Neighbouring municipalities are Iisalmi, Keitele, Kiuruvesi, Maaninka, Pihtipudas, Pyhäjärvi, and Tervo.

On the north-western side of the village lies Lake Pielavesi.

== Notable people ==
- Urho Kekkonen (1900–1986), who served as President of Finland for 26 years, was born in Pielavesi in a log cabin called Lepikko torp (Lepikon torppa).
- Lauri Kokkonen, author and playwright
- Ilpo Saastamoinen, musician and composer
- Antti Ruuskanen, javelin thrower and Olympic medalist

Pielavesi is also well-known for its successful volleyball club, Pielaveden Sampo.
