= Lake Konnevesi =

Lake in Finland

Konnevesi
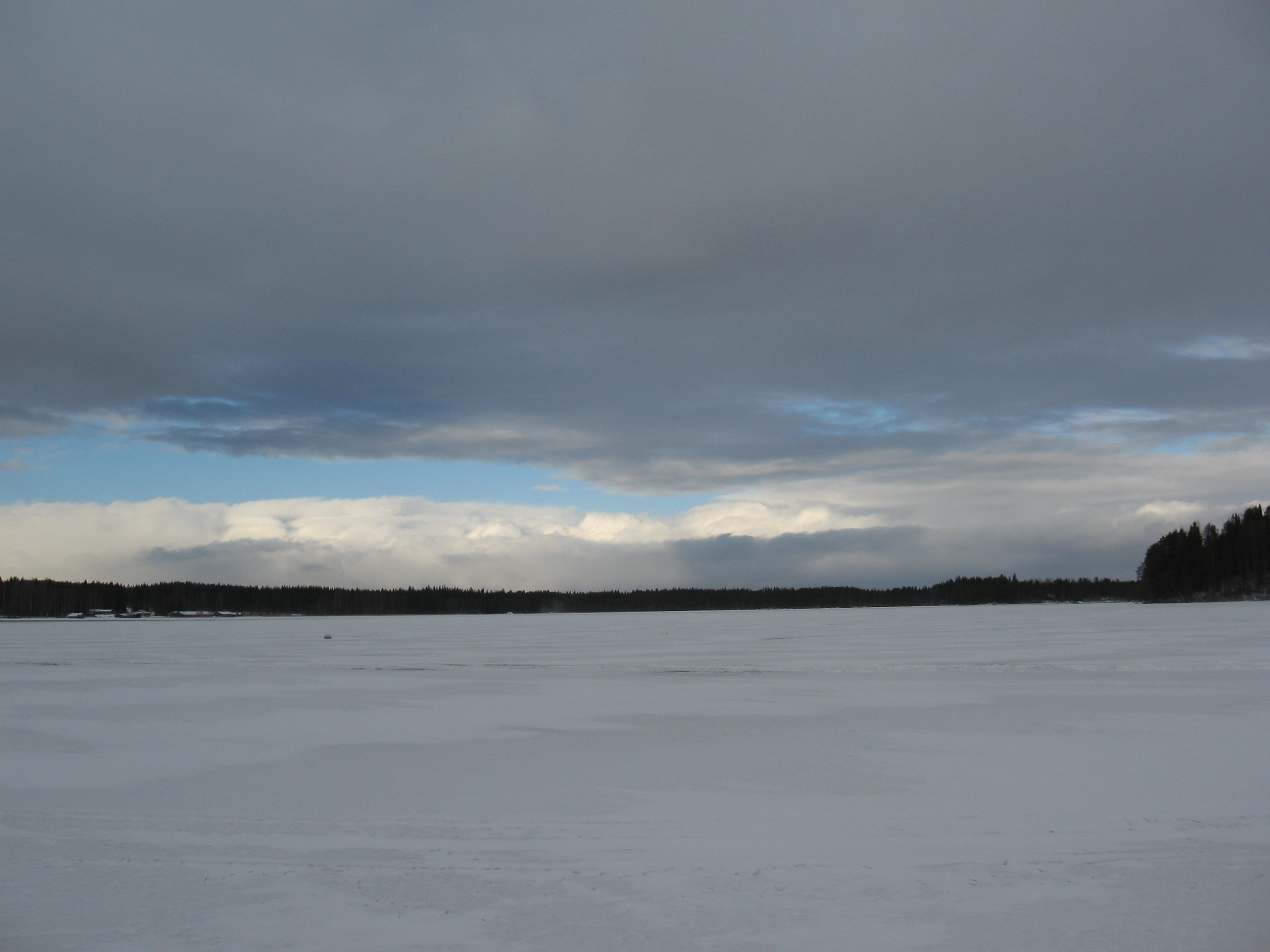

- Location within Finland
- Location: Central Finland/Northern Savonia border
- Coordinates: 62°41′N 026°33′E
- Lake type: Natural
- Basin countries: Finland
- Surface area: 189.18 km^{2} (46,750 acres)
- Max. depth: 57 m (187 ft)
- Water volume: 2 km^{3} (1,600,000 acre⋅ft)
- Shore length^{1}: 624 km (388 mi)
- Surface elevation: 95.4 m (313 ft)
- ^{1} Shore length is not a well-defined measure.

Konnevesi is a lake in Finland. Konnevesi is a rather large lake in the Kymijoki main catchment area. It is located in the regions Pohjois-Savo and Keski-Suomi. There is a plan (year 2014) to establish a new National Park to the Southern Konnevesi. Quality of water is excellent.
