= Keitele =

- Municipality
- Keiteleen kunta Keitele kommun
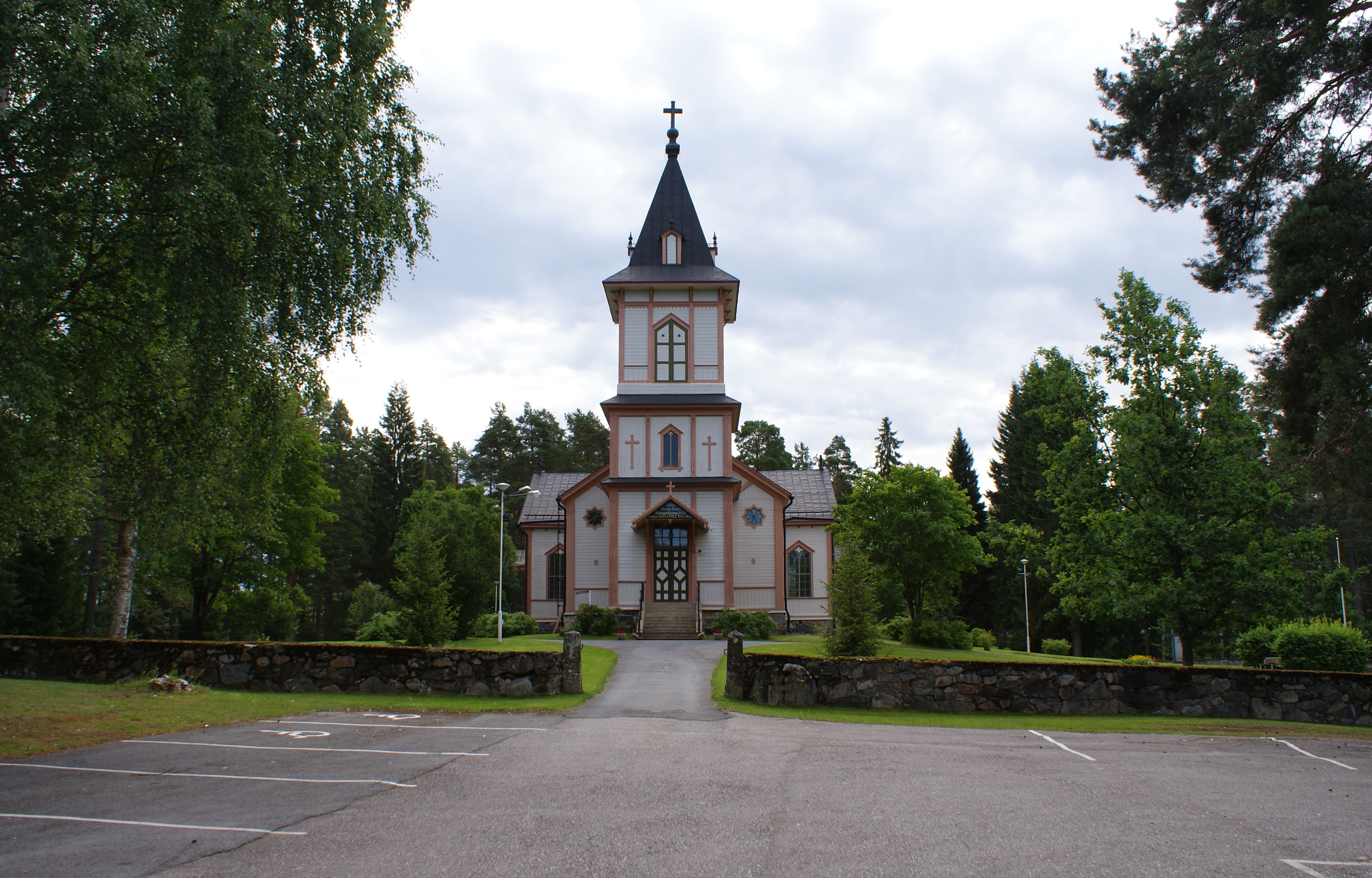

- Coat of arms

- Location of Keitele in Finland
- Interactive map of Keitele
- Coordinates: 63°10.7′N 026°21′E
- Country: Finland
- Region: North Savo
- Sub-region: Upper Savo
- Charter: 1879

Government
  - Municipal manager: Hanna Helaste

Area (2018-01-01)
  - Total: 578.30 km^{2} (223.28 sq mi)
  - Land: 482.91 km^{2} (186.45 sq mi)
  - Water: 96.59 km^{2} (37.29 sq mi)
  - Rank: 179th largest in Finland

Population (2025-12-31)
  - Total: 1,922
  - Rank: 258th largest in Finland
  - Density: 3.98/km^{2} (10.3/sq mi)

Population by native language
  - Finnish: 96.5% (official)
  - Others: 3.5%

Population by age
  - 0 to 14: 11%
  - 15 to 64: 50.6%
  - 65 or older: 38.3%
- Time zone: UTC+02:00 (EET)
  - Summer (DST): UTC+03:00 (EEST)
- Postal code: 72600
- Area code: 017
- Website: www.keitele.fi (in Finnish)

Keitele is a municipality of Finland.

It is part of the North Savo region. The municipality has a population of 1,922 (31 December 2025) and covers an area of 578.30 square kilometres (223.28 sq mi) of which 96.59 km^{2} (37.29 sq mi) is water. The population density is 3.98 inhabitants per square kilometre (10.3/sq mi).

Neighbour municipalities are Pielavesi, Pihtipudas, Tervo, Vesanto and Viitasaari.

Despite its name, the municipality is not located by the lake Keitele. The shortest distance between the municipality and the lake is roughly ten kilometers.

The municipality is unilingually Finnish.

== Notable people born in Keitele ==
- Ilmari Tossavainen (1887–1978)
- Kalle Matilainen (1903–1973)
- Rakel Hiltunen (1940–)
- Mikko Härkin (1979–)

== See also ==
- Finnish national road 77
