= North Savo =

Region of Finland

North Savo Pohjois-Savo (Finnish) Norra Savolax (Swedish)
- Region
- Region of North Savo; Pohjois-Savon maakunta Landskapet Norra Savolax
- Flag Coat of arms

- North Savo on a map of Finland
- Coordinates: 63°N 27°E
- Country: Finland
- Historical province: Savo
- Capital: Kuopio
- Other towns: Iisalmi, Kiuruvesi, Suonenjoki and Varkaus

Government
  - Regional Mayor: Tytti Seppänen

Area
  - Total: 20,366.70 km^{2} (7,863.63 sq mi)

Population (2019)
  - Total: 244,236
  - Density: 11.9919/km^{2} (31.0590/sq mi)

GDP
  - Total: €7.831 billion (2015)
  - Per capita: €31,542 (2015)
- Time zone: UTC+2 (EET)
  - Summer (DST): UTC+3 (EEST)
- ISO 3166 code: FI-15
- NUTS: 132
- Regional mammal: Moose, Alces alces
- Regional bird: Black-throated Diver, Gavia arctica
- Regional fish: Vendace, Coregonus albula
- Regional flower: Rowan, Sorbus aucuparia
- Regional stone: Apatite
- Regional lake: Lake Juojärvi
- Website: pohjois-savo.fi

North Savo (or Northern Savonia; Finnish: Pohjois-Savo; Swedish: Norra Savolax) is a region in eastern Finland. It borders the regions of South Savo, Central Finland, North Ostrobothnia, Kainuu, and North Karelia. Kuopio is the largest city in the region and Lake Kallavesi is the largest lake in the region.

The region's traditional food is a fish and bacon filling pie called Kalakukko.

== Historical provinces ==
For history, geography and culture see: Savo

== Municipalities ==
The region of North Savo consists of 19 municipalities, five of which have city status (marked in bold).

=== Municipalities on the map ===
Cities and municipalities of North Savo.

=== Sub-regions ===
Northeast Savo

- Kaavi
- Rautavaara
- Tuusniemi

Kuopio sub-region

- **Kuopio**
- Siilinjärvi

Inner Savo

- Rautalampi
- **Suonenjoki**
- Tervo
- Vesanto

Varkaus sub-region

- Joroinen (Jorois)
- Leppävirta
- **Varkaus**

Upper Savo

- **Iisalmi** (Idensalmi)
- Keitele
- **Kiuruvesi**
- Lapinlahti
- Pielavesi
- Sonkajärvi
- Vieremä

=== List of municipalities ===
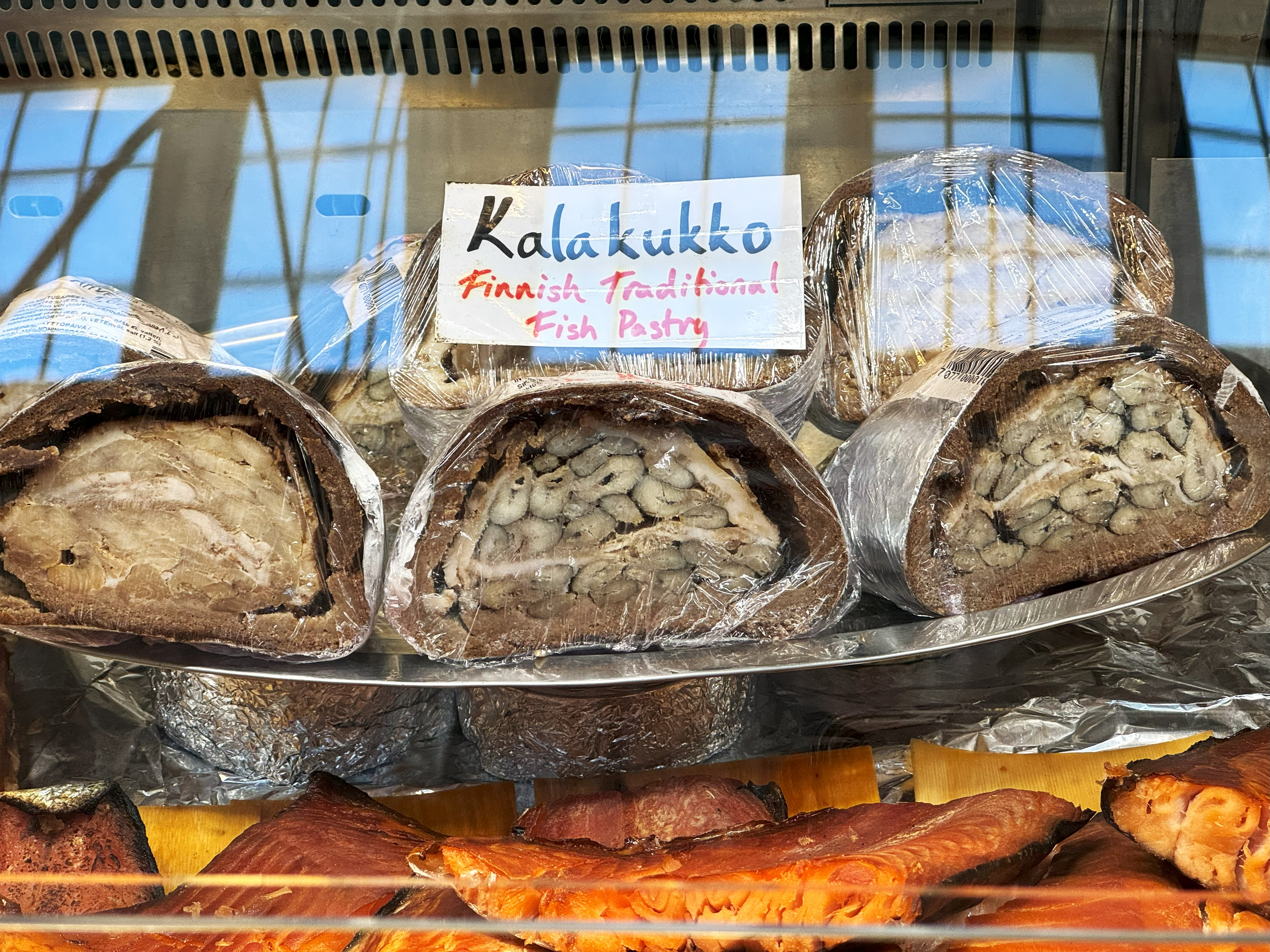
Kalakukko

| Coat of arms | Municipality | Population | Land area (km^{2}) | Density (/km^{2}) | Finnish speakers | Swedish speakers | Other speakers |
|---|---|---|---|---|---|---|---|
| coat of arms of Iisalmi | Iisalmi | 20,205 | 763 | 26 | 95 % | 0 % | 5 % |
| coat of arms of Joroinen | Joroinen | 4,494 | 575 | 8 | 92 % | 0.4 % | 8 % |
| coat of arms of Kaavi | Kaavi | 2,547 | 674 | 4 | 97 % | 0 % | 2 % |
| coat of arms of Keitele | Keitele | 1,922 | 483 | 4 | 96 % | 0 % | 3 % |
| coat of arms of Kiuruvesi | Kiuruvesi | 7,255 | 1,328 | 5 | 98 % | 0 % | 2 % |
| coat of arms of Kuopio | Kuopio | 126,572 | 3,242 | 39 | 93 % | 0.1 % | 7 % |
| coat of arms of Lapinlahti | Lapinlahti | 8,803 | 1,097 | 8 | 97 % | 0.1 % | 3 % |
| coat of arms of Leppävirta | Leppävirta | 8,924 | 1,136 | 8 | 97 % | 0.1 % | 3 % |
| coat of arms of Pielavesi | Pielavesi | 3,873 | 1,153 | 3 | 97 % | 0.3 % | 2 % |
| coat of arms of Rautalampi | Rautalampi | 2,928 | 539 | 5 | 95 % | 0 % | 5 % |
| coat of arms of Rautavaara | Rautavaara | 1,398 | 1,151 | 1 | 97 % | 0 % | 3 % |
| coat of arms of Siilinjärvi | Siilinjärvi | 21,348 | 401 | 53 | 97 % | 0.1 % | 2 % |
| coat of arms of Sonkajärvi | Sonkajärvi | 3,521 | 1,466 | 2 | 98 % | 0 % | 2 % |
| coat of arms Suonenjoki | Suonenjoki | 6,549 | 714 | 9 | 95 % | 0 % | 5 % |
| coat of arms of Tervo | Tervo | 1,388 | 348 | 4 | 97 % | 0 % | 3 % |
| coat of arms of Tuusniemi | Tuusniemi | 2,270 | 543 | 4 | 97 % | 0 % | 3 % |
| coat of arms of Varkaus | Varkaus | 19,433 | 386 | 50 | 93 % | 0.2 % | 7 % |
| coat of arms of Vesanto | Vesanto | 1,787 | 423 | 4 | 96 % | 0 % | 4 % |
| coat of arms of Vieremä | Vieremä | 3,295 | 925 | 4 | 95 % | 0 % | 5 % |
| | Total | 248,512 | 17,346 | 14 | 94 % | 0.1 % | 6 % |

== Demographics ==
Population size 1990–2025
| Year | Population |
|---|---|
| 1990 | 265,040 |
| 1995 | 266,308 |
| 2000 | 259,639 |
| 2005 | 255,683 |
| 2010 | 253,337 |
| 2015 | 253,239 |
| 2020 | 248,265 |
| 2025 | 248,512 |

== Politics ==
For parliamentary elections, North Savo, together with the region of North Karelia, is part of the Savo-Karelia constituency. As of 2023, the constituency elects 15 of the 200 members of the Parliament of Finland.

== Tertiary education ==
- University of Eastern Finland, Kuopio Campus (enrollment c. 6,000, in Kuopio)
- Savonia University of Applied Sciences (enrollment c. 6,000, in Kuopio (about 4,500), Varkaus and Iisalmi)
- Kuopio department of Sibelius Academy (c. 150 studying for Master of Music in Church music or Master of Arts in Arts Management)
- Kuopio department of Humak University of Applied Sciences (c. 100 studying to be Sign language Interpreters)
