= Vesanto =

- Municipality
- Vesannon kunta Vesanto kommun
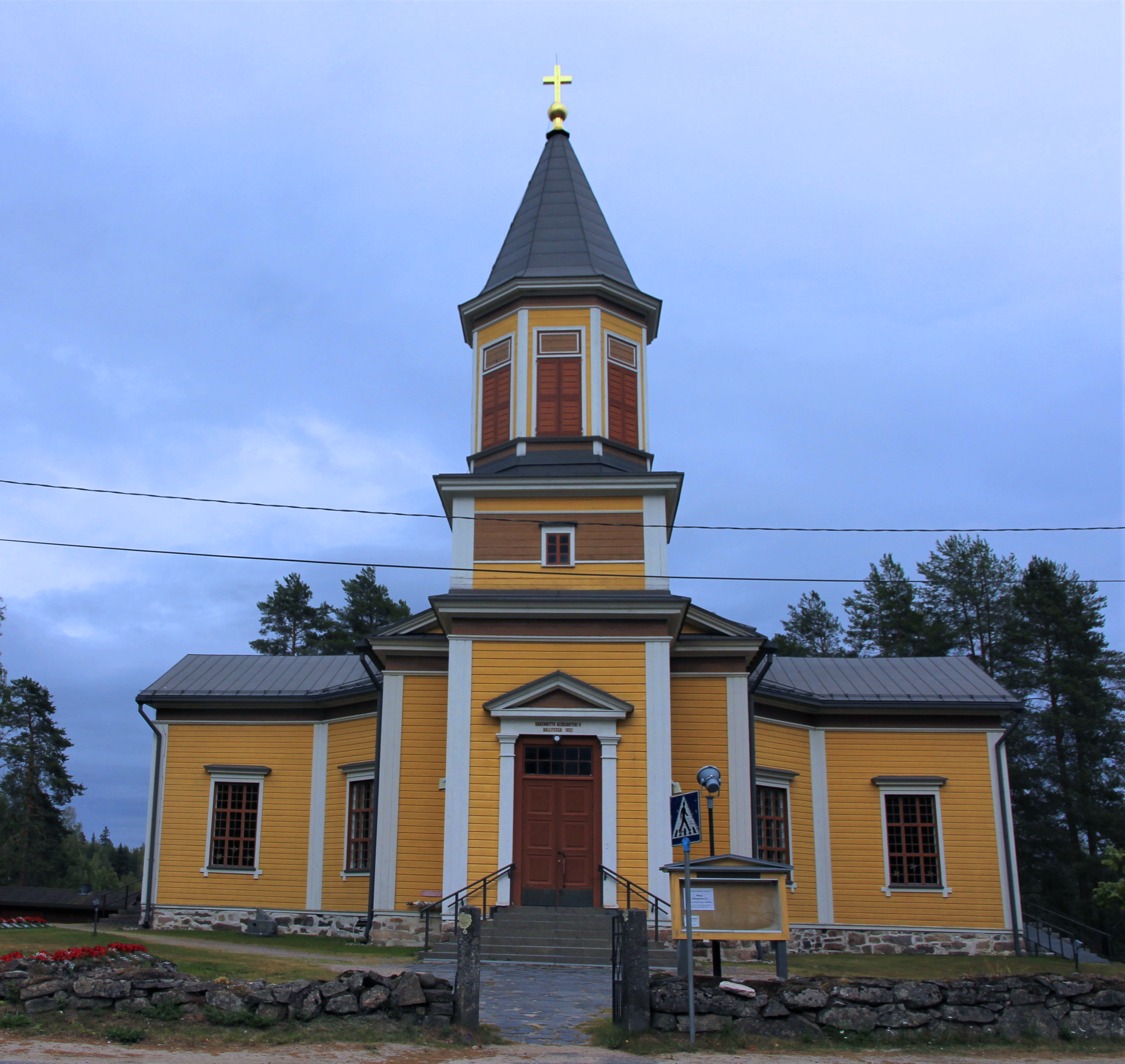
- Vesanto Church

- Coat of arms

- Location of Vesanto in Finland
- Interactive map of Vesanto
- Coordinates: 62°56′N 026°25′E
- Country: Finland
- Region: North Savo
- Sub-region: Inner Savo
- Charter: 1871

Government
  - Municipal manager: Pasi Lievonen

Area (2018-01-01)
  - Total: 569.80 km^{2} (220.00 sq mi)
  - Land: 422.63 km^{2} (163.18 sq mi)
  - Water: 147.1 km^{2} (56.8 sq mi)
  - Rank: 198th largest in Finland

Population (2025-12-31)
  - Total: 1,787
  - Rank: 263rd largest in Finland
  - Density: 4.23/km^{2} (11.0/sq mi)

Population by native language
  - Finnish: 96.4% (official)
  - Others: 3.6%

Population by age
  - 0 to 14: 9.1%
  - 15 to 64: 48.5%
  - 65 or older: 42.4%
- Time zone: UTC+02:00 (EET)
  - Summer (DST): UTC+03:00 (EEST)
- Website: vesanto.fi

Vesanto is a municipality of Finland. Located in the North Savo region, the municipality has a population of 1,787 (31 December 2025) and covers an area of 569.80 square kilometres (220.00 sq mi) of which 147.1 km^{2} (56.8 sq mi), or 26%, is water. The population density is 4.23 inhabitants per square kilometre (11.0/sq mi).

The municipality is unilingually Finnish.

Neighbour municipalities are Keitele, Konnevesi, Rautalampi, Tervo, Viitasaari and Äänekoski.

== Notable people ==
- Helka Hynninen (1930–2017)
- Kalevi Huuskonen (1932–1999)
- Leena Lehtolainen (born 1964)

== See also ==
- Finnish regional road 551
