= Kalajokilaakso =

Drainage basin in Finland

Kalajokilaakso stands for the "basin of Kalajoki river", located in Ostrobothnia, Finland. At the mouth of the river, lies the town of Kalajoki. The Kalajoki river runs to the Gulf of Bothnia of the Baltic Sea.

Municipalities along the Kalajoki river are Alavieska, Haapajärvi, Kalajoki, Nivala, Sievi and Ylivieska.

Kalajoki translates directly to "Fish River".

Kalajokilaakso is also the name of the local newspaper, established in 1930.
