= Kalajoki (river) =

River in Finland

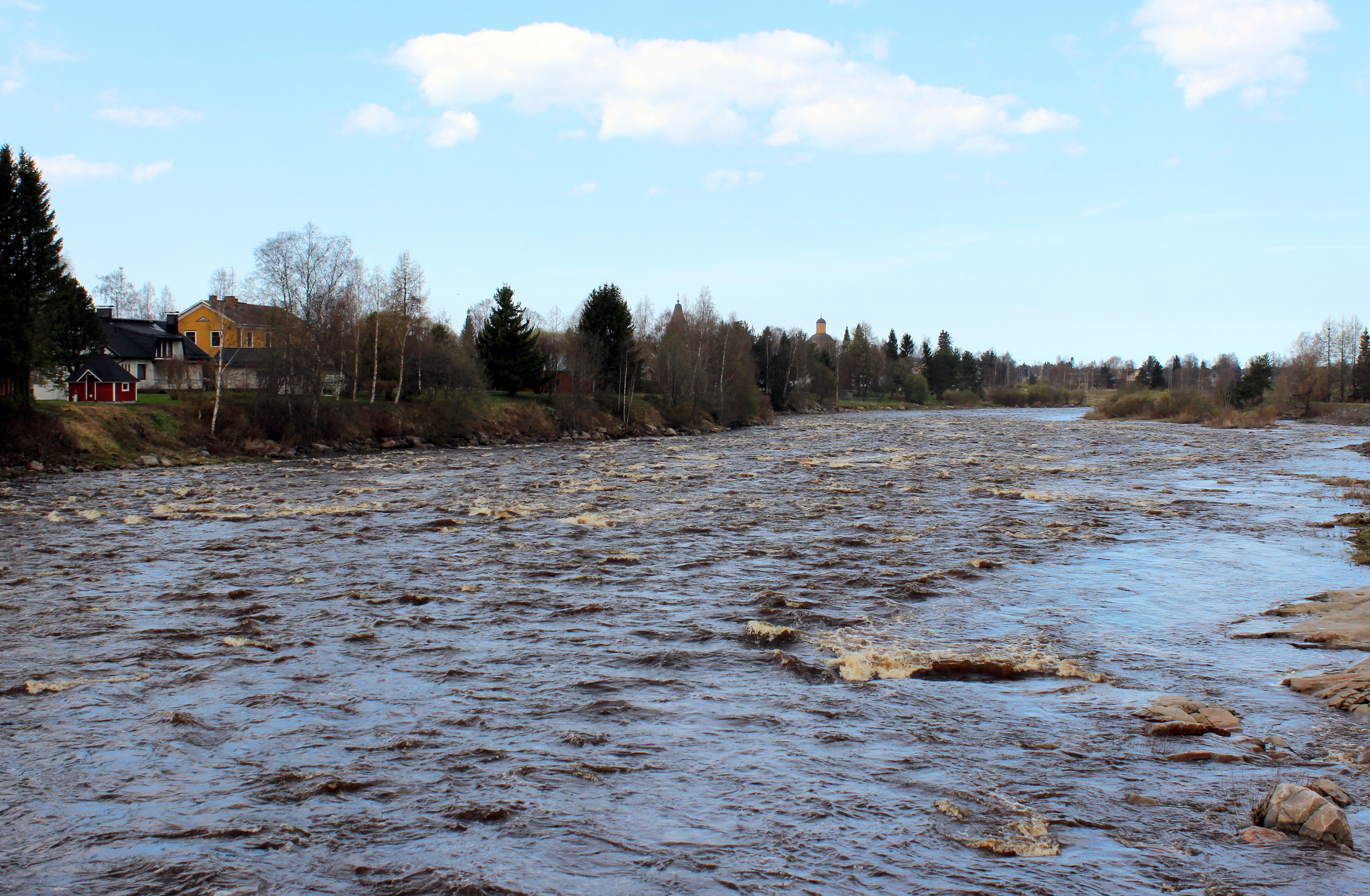

Location
- Country: Finland

Physical characteristics
- Source
  - location: Lake Reisjärvi, Reisjärvi, Finland
  - elevation: 99
- Mouth
  - location: Bothnian Bay in Kalajoki, Finland
  - coordinates: 64°16′14″N 023°55′22″E
- Length: 113 km (70 mi)
- Basin size: 4,247 km^{2} (1,640 sq mi)
- Discharge
  - location: Bothnian Bay
  - average: 29.5 cubic metres per second (1,040 cu ft/s)
  - minimum: 4.18 cubic metres per second (148 cu ft/s)

The Kalajoki (literally "Fish River") is a 113-kilometre (70 mi) river in Northern Ostrobothnia, Finland. The river's origin is at the Hautaperä reservoir and it flows northwest to its mouth is in Kalajoki municipality where the river flows into the Bothnian Bay of the Baltic Sea.

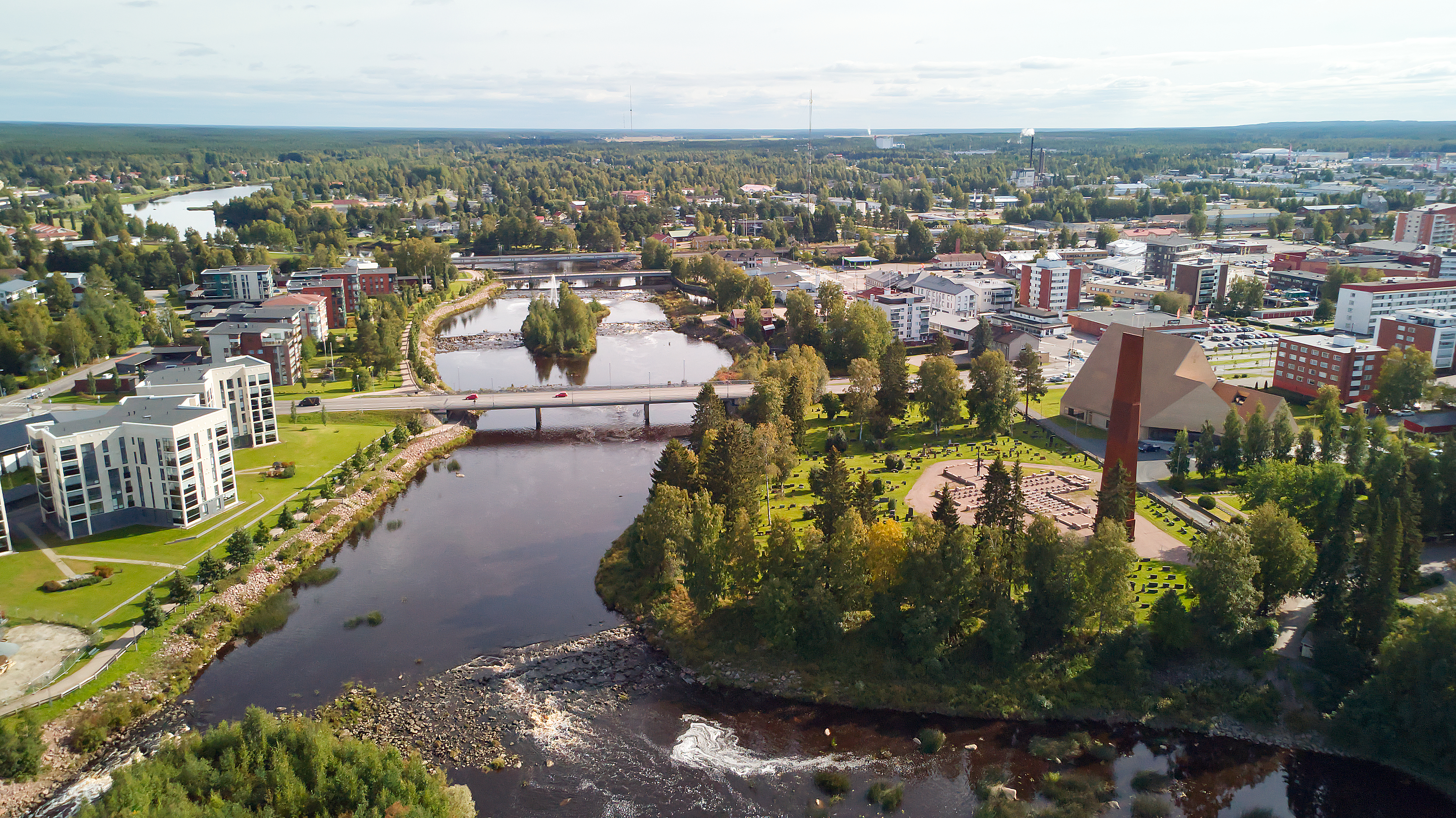
The Kalajoki winding through the town of Ylivieska.

It offers cycling and hiking trails in forest for the tourists apart from the river landscapes, rural villages, and the seaside, where one can go surfing on the waves or on the frozen sea.

There are four hydroelectric dams along the river, including one with a flood-control reservoir on the river near Haapajärvi.
