= Matti Kotila =

Finnish farmer and politician (1887–1953)

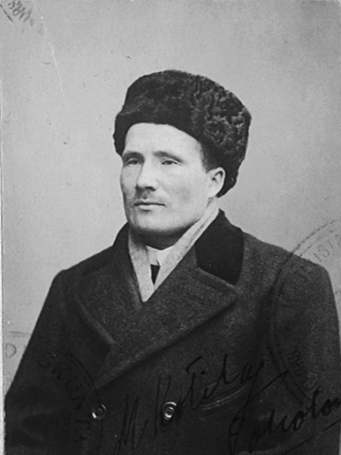
Matti M. Kotila

Matti Miika Jaakonpoika Kotila (18 October 1887 – 20 December 1953) was a Finnish farmer and politician, born in Toholampi. He was a member of the Parliament of Finland from 1916 to 1919, representing the Finnish Party until 5 November 1918 and the Agrarian League after that.
