= Lestijärvi =

- Municipality
- Lestijärven kunta Lestijärvi kommun
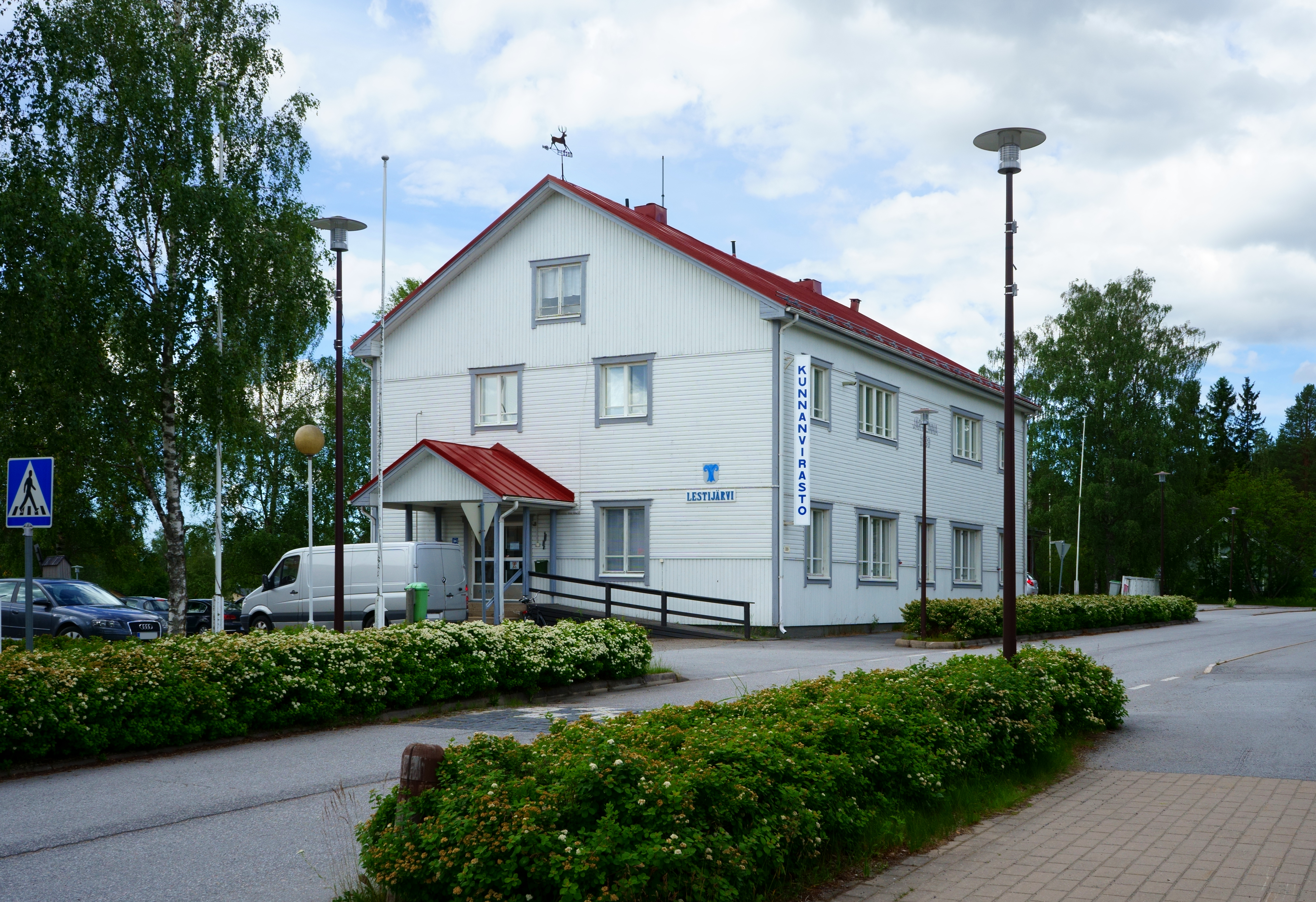
- Lestijärvi municipal office

- Coat of arms

- Location of Lestijärvi in Finland
- Interactive map of Lestijärvi
- Coordinates: 63°31.5′N 024°40′E
- Country: Finland
- Region: Central Ostrobothnia
- Sub-region: Kaustinen sub-region

Government
  - Municipal manager: Esko Ahonen

Area (2018-01-01)
  - Total: 559.06 km^{2} (215.85 sq mi)
  - Land: 480.06 km^{2} (185.35 sq mi)
  - Water: 78.37 km^{2} (30.26 sq mi)
  - Rank: 180th largest in Finland

Population (2025-12-31)
  - Total: 656
  - Rank: 300th largest in Finland
  - Density: 1.37/km^{2} (3.5/sq mi)

Population by native language
  - Finnish: 98% (official)
  - Others: 2%

Population by age
  - 0 to 14: 15.1%
  - 15 to 64: 53.6%
  - 65 or older: 31.3%
- Time zone: UTC+02:00 (EET)
  - Summer (DST): UTC+03:00 (EEST)
- Website: lestijarvi.fi/en/

Lestijärvi is a municipality of Finland. There is also the Lake Lestijärvi in the area.

Lestijärvi is located in the province of Western Finland and is part of the Central Ostrobothnia region. The municipality has a population of 656 (31 December 2025), which makes it the smallest municipality of Mainland Finland in terms of population. It covers an area of 559.06 square kilometres (215.85 sq mi) of which 78.37 km^{2} (30.26 sq mi) is water. The population density is 1.37 inhabitants per square kilometre (3.5/sq mi).

Neighbouring municipalities are Halsua, Kinnula, Kokkola, Perho, Reisjärvi, Sievi and Toholampi.

The municipality is unilingually Finnish.

== Demographics ==
The three main villages of the municipality are Lestijärven kirkonkylä, Syri and Yli-Lesti.

This small, isolated rural area suffers from depopulation as in many other similar parts of Finland. The local community provide a subsidy of €1,000 p.a. to families who have a child and stay in the community. Other areas of Finland have similar schemes, such as providing very cheap land. After several years, the subsidy seems to be increasing the number of children in the community.

== People born in Lestijärvi ==
- Arthur Aspelin (1868 – 1949)
- Heimo Rekonen (1920 – 1997)

== See also ==
- Finnish national road 58
