= Fingerroos (surname) =

Fingerroos is a Swedish-language surname, more common in Finland than in Sweden.

== Geographical distribution ==
As of 2014, 96.4% of all known bearers of the surname Fingerroos were residents of Finland (frequency 1:29,238) and 1.5% of Sweden (1:3,282,253).

In Finland, the frequency of the surname was higher than national average (1:29,238) in the following regions:

1. North Ostrobothnia (1:4,067)
2. Central Ostrobothnia (1:16,718)
3. Southwest Finland (1:16,963)

In Sweden, the frequency of the surname was higher than national average (1:3,282,253) in the following counties:

1. Stockholm County (1:1,121,800)
2. Skåne County (1:1,288,949)
