= Ylivieska =

Ylivieska, Finland
- Town
- Ylivieskan kaupunki Ylivieska stad
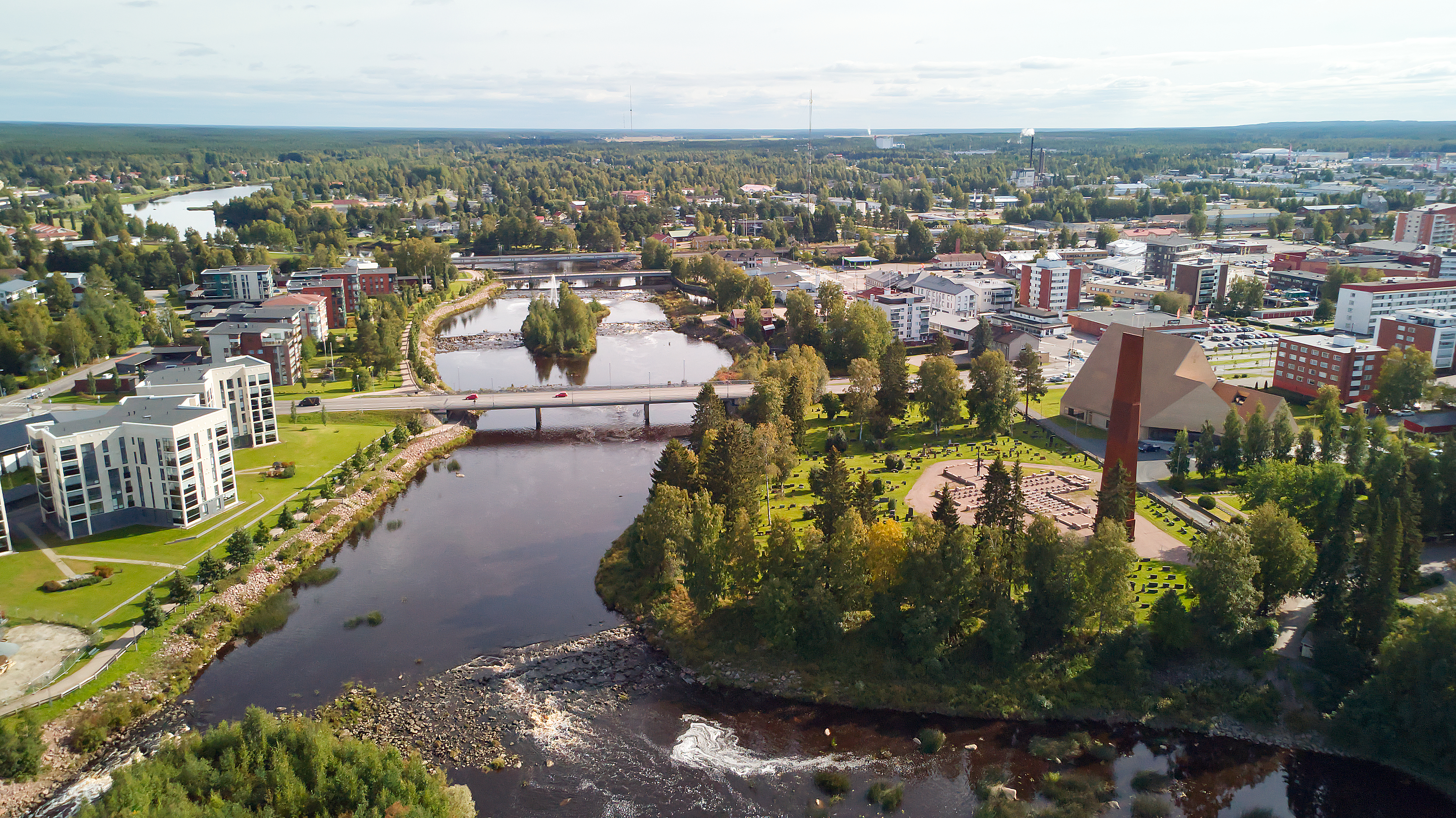
- Aerial view of Ylivieska, with the Kalajoki river flowing through the center

- Coat of arms

- Location of Ylivieska in Finland
- Interactive map of Ylivieska, Finland
- Coordinates: 64°04.5′N 024°32′E
- Country: Finland
- Region: North Ostrobothnia
- Sub-region: Ylivieska
- Charter: 1867
- Market town: 1965
- City rights: 1971

Government
  - Town manager: Maria Sorvisto

Area (2018-01-01)
  - Total: 573.42 km^{2} (221.40 sq mi)
  - Land: 569.83 km^{2} (220.01 sq mi)
  - Water: 4.56 km^{2} (1.76 sq mi)
  - Rank: 150th largest in Finland

Population (2025-12-31)
  - Total: 15,274
  - Rank: 71st largest in Finland
  - Density: 26.8/km^{2} (69/sq mi)

Population by native language
  - Finnish: 97.2% (official)
  - Swedish: 0.2%
  - Others: 2.6%

Population by age
  - 0 to 14: 21%
  - 15 to 64: 58.6%
  - 65 or older: 20.5%
- Time zone: UTC+02:00 (EET)
  - Summer (DST): UTC+03:00 (EEST)
- Website: www.ylivieska.fi/en/

Ylivieska (Finnish pronunciation: [ˈyliˌʋie̯skɑ]) is a town and municipality of Northern Ostrobothnia region, Finland. It has a population of 15,274 (31 December 2025), and it serves as the administrative centre for Kalajokilaakso and Pyhäjokilaakso, an area with a population of about 90,000 inhabitants. Ylivieska is also the commercial center of the Oulu South region, the southern part of the late Oulu province.

The municipality is unilingually Finnish. The word Yli means "upper", while the word Vieska is supposed to mean a "shallow ford".

== Geography ==
Ylivieska is located in Northern Ostrobothnia about 130 kilometres (80 mi) south of the city of Oulu. Other close cities near Ylivieska are Vaasa (199 km or 124 mi) and Kokkola (79 km or 49 mi); the neighbouring municipalities are Oulainen, Haapavesi, Nivala, Sievi, Kalajoki, Alavieska and Merijärvi.

The town is characterized by the Kalajoki River, which runs SE–NW through the town centre. The agricultural and economical area of the Kalajoki river basin is known as Kalajokilaakso.

Ylivieska is situated along the Ostrobothnia railway, which leads from Helsinki, the national capital, to Rovaniemi in the north of the country. The railway was opened in 1886 and it has had a significant role in the town's economical development. Ylivieska is junction station with services to Iisalmi and other Eastern Finland. There are also coach services to Jyväskylä and Kajaani.

=== Climate ===
Ylivieska has a subarctic climate (Köppen: Dfc).

Climate data for Ylivieska
Month	Jan	Feb	Mar	Apr	May	Jun	Jul	Aug	Sep	Oct	Nov	Dec	Year
Mean daily maximum °C (°F)	−5.3 (22.5)	−4.1 (24.6)	0.6 (33.1)	7.3 (45.1)	14.1 (57.4)	18.6 (65.5)	21.2 (70.2)	19.3 (66.7)	13.7 (56.7)	6.2 (43.2)	0.9 (33.6)	−2.8 (27.0)	7.5 (45.5)
Daily mean °C (°F)	−7.7 (18.1)	−7.1 (19.2)	−3.4 (25.9)	3.0 (37.4)	9.4 (48.9)	14.2 (57.6)	16.9 (62.4)	14.8 (58.6)	9.7 (49.5)	3.6 (38.5)	−0.9 (30.4)	−4.9 (23.2)	4.0 (39.1)
Mean daily minimum °C (°F)	−10.5 (13.1)	−10.4 (13.3)	−7.6 (18.3)	−1.6 (29.1)	3.9 (39.0)	8.6 (47.5)	11.7 (53.1)	10.1 (50.2)	5.9 (42.6)	1.0 (33.8)	−2.9 (26.8)	−7.2 (19.0)	0.1 (32.2)
Average precipitation mm (inches)	38.6 (1.52)	34.6 (1.36)	29.3 (1.15)	35.6 (1.40)	55.6 (2.19)	68.2 (2.69)	85.7 (3.37)	84.1 (3.31)	60.4 (2.38)	58.3 (2.30)	49.7 (1.96)	47.6 (1.87)	647.7 (25.5)
Source: Weather.Directory

== History ==
Ylivieska is the home of a spreading agricultural technology called moist grain crimping, developed in the late 1960s by two local brothers.

Its church burned down on 26 March 2016.

== Economy ==
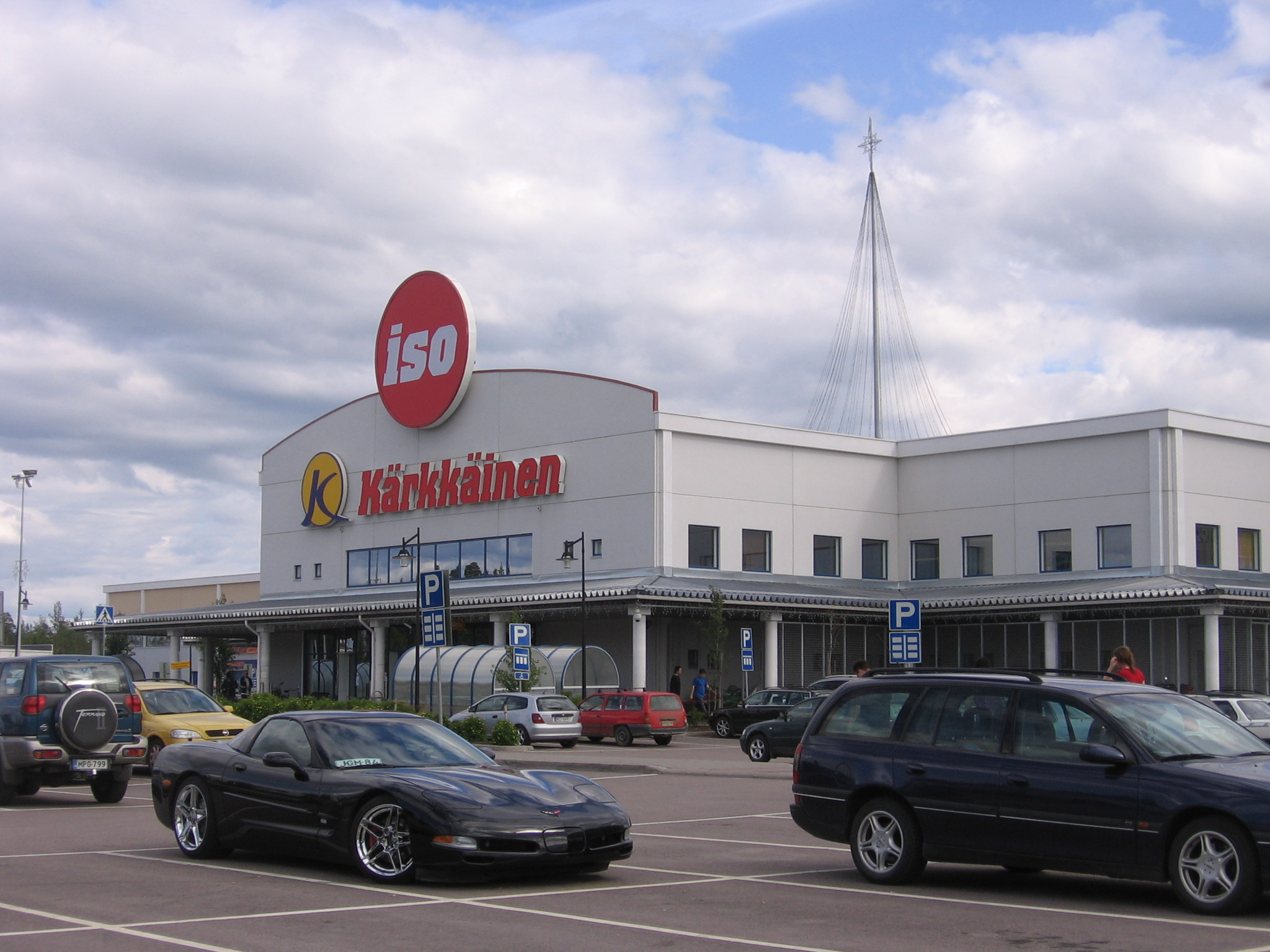
Kärkkäinen discount store in Ylivieska

Employment by industry (2005)

- Services 66.1%
- Industry 28.5%
- Agriculture and forestry 5.4%
- Unemployment 11%

Agriculture and animal husbandry, mainly milking cows, used to be the main sources of livelihood in Ylivieska. In recent decades, the role of agriculture has reduced following the development of industry and services. Currently, Ylivieska is home to about 30 industrial enterprises, some of which are also internationally recognized in their respective niche markets.

Regionally, Ylivieska has become an important place for car buyers. There are several stores and agents selling new and used cars, and purchases average about 6,000 cars per year. Thus, the local car sales entrepreneurs have created the concept of Ylivieska being the "Autolaakso" or "car valley" of the Kalajokilaakso and neighbouring regions.

== Culture ==
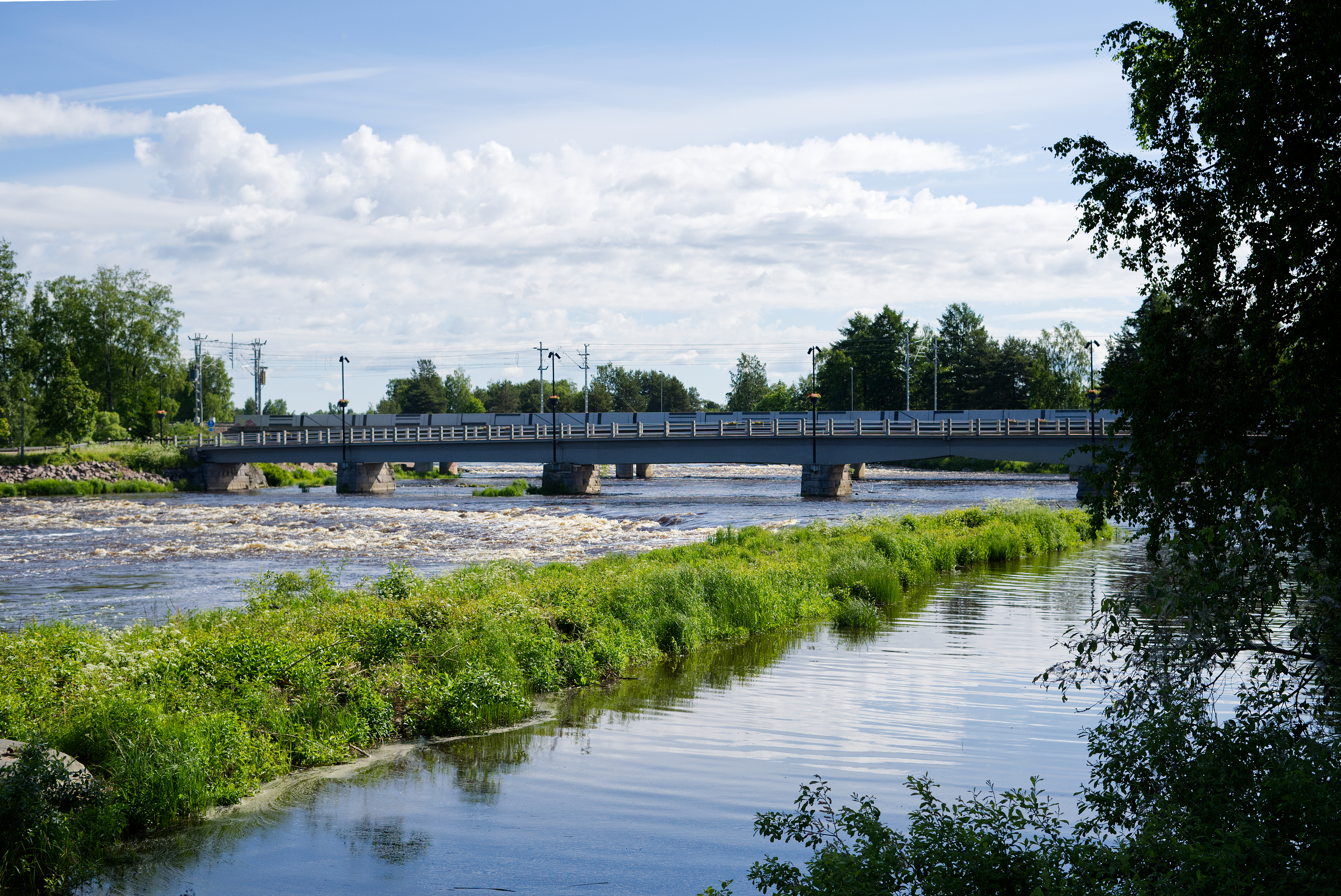
The second oldest concrete bridge in Finland, built in 1912 and named humorously as Savisilta ("clay bridge"), is located in Ylivieska

The Ylivieska City Library operates through the library building, the bookmobile, the home library and the Joki Libraries online library and other offices.

The Culture Center Akustiikka is a cultural center in the town center. There is a 405-seat concert hall, an exhibition hall, a recording studio, and meeting and video conference rooms. There are many different concerts and events in Akustiikka, 15 exhibitions a year in the exhibition hall. Akustiikka also serves as Ylivieska's cinema.

The Pro Ylivieska Medal is a recognition given to a person or community in Ylivieska in recognition of merit in the field of science, sports, art or other cultural work for long-term and significant work in society or significant national achievements.

The Home Region Museum of Ylivieska features traditional countryside lifestyle, some old buildings, and as a curiosity, a 700-piece collection of milk jugs, with jugs from 15 countries.

The specialty foods of Ylivieska are maitorieska, a simple flat bread made of barley flour, milk and salt, and pepu, which has the same ingredients as the maitorieska, but instead of being formed into flat breads and baked, is boiled and pan fried. At the neighbouring municipality Sievi, a specialty food is mutti, which is unfried pepu.

== Notable people ==
- Kyösti Kallio (1873–1940), the 4th President of Finland, was born in Ylivieska.
- Hannu Kivioja (born 1963), actor
- Juha Kärkkäinen (born 1967), owner of Kärkkäinen (chain store), which started in Ylivieska, and recipient of the Pro Ylivieska medal in 2014.

== International relations ==
=== Twin towns — sister cities ===
Ylivieska is twinned with:

- Voss Municipality, Norway

=== Friendship ===
- Viimsi, Estonia

== See also ==
- Ylivieska Airfield
- Ylivieska railway station
- Alavieska
