= Kannus =

- Town
- Kannuksen kaupunki Kannus stad
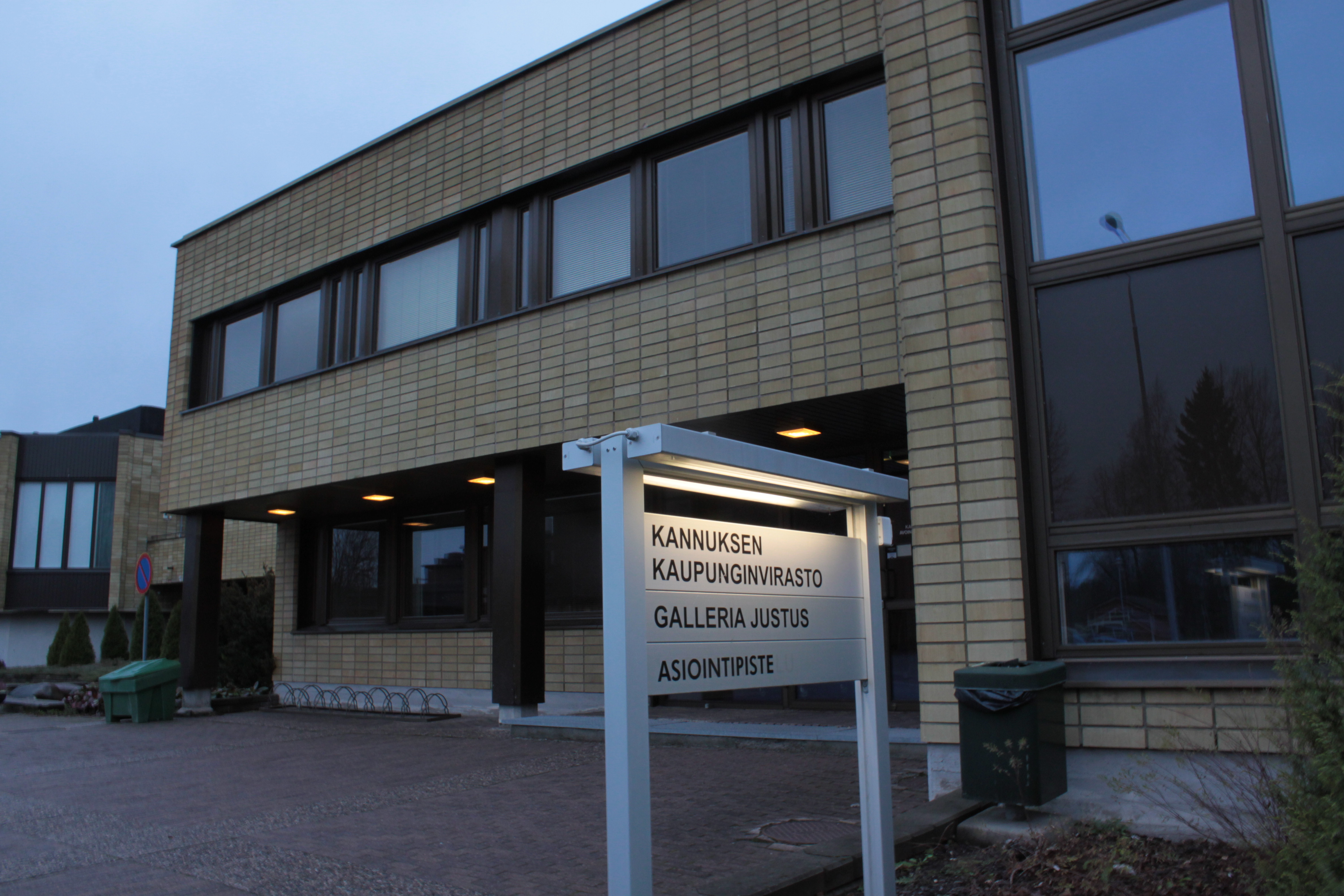
- Kannus Town Hall

- Coat of arms

- Location of Kannus in Finland
- Interactive map of Kannus
- Coordinates: 63°54′N 023°55′E
- Country: Finland
- Region: Central Ostrobothnia
- Sub-region: Kokkola sub-region
- Charter: 1859

Government
  - Town manager: Jussi Niinistö

Area (2018-01-01)
  - Total: 470.65 km^{2} (181.72 sq mi)
  - Land: 468.04 km^{2} (180.71 sq mi)
  - Water: 2.41 km^{2} (0.93 sq mi)
  - Rank: 184th largest in Finland

Population (2025-12-31)
  - Total: 5,246
  - Rank: 162nd largest in Finland
  - Density: 11.21/km^{2} (29.0/sq mi)

Population by native language
  - Finnish: 96.7% (official)
  - Swedish: 0.4%
  - Others: 2.9%

Population by age
  - 0 to 14: 18.1%
  - 15 to 64: 57.5%
  - 65 or older: 24.4%
- Time zone: UTC+02:00 (EET)
  - Summer (DST): UTC+03:00 (EEST)
- Website: kannus.fi

Kannus (Finnish pronunciation: [ˈkɑnːus]) is a town and municipality of Finland. It is situated in the province of Western Finland and is part of the Central Ostrobothnia region. The municipality has a population of 5,246 (31 December 2025) and covers an area of 470.65 square kilometres (181.72 sq mi), of which 2.41 km^{2} (0.93 sq mi) is water. The population density is 11.21 inhabitants per square kilometre (29.0/sq mi). The municipality is unilingually Finnish. Neighbour municipalities are Kalajoki, Kokkola, Sievi and Toholampi.

The area of Kannus was long inhabited by Sámi. This is also indicated by the name of the town, which means Sámi witch drum. The hammer of the witch drum in the coat of arms of the town also refers to the same.

== Notable people ==
- William R. Copeland (1936–2023), Finnish-American historian
- Oskari Tokoi (1873–1963), socialist leader and the Chairman of the Senate of Finland
