= Johan Gabriel Ståhlberg =

Finnish priest (1832–1873)

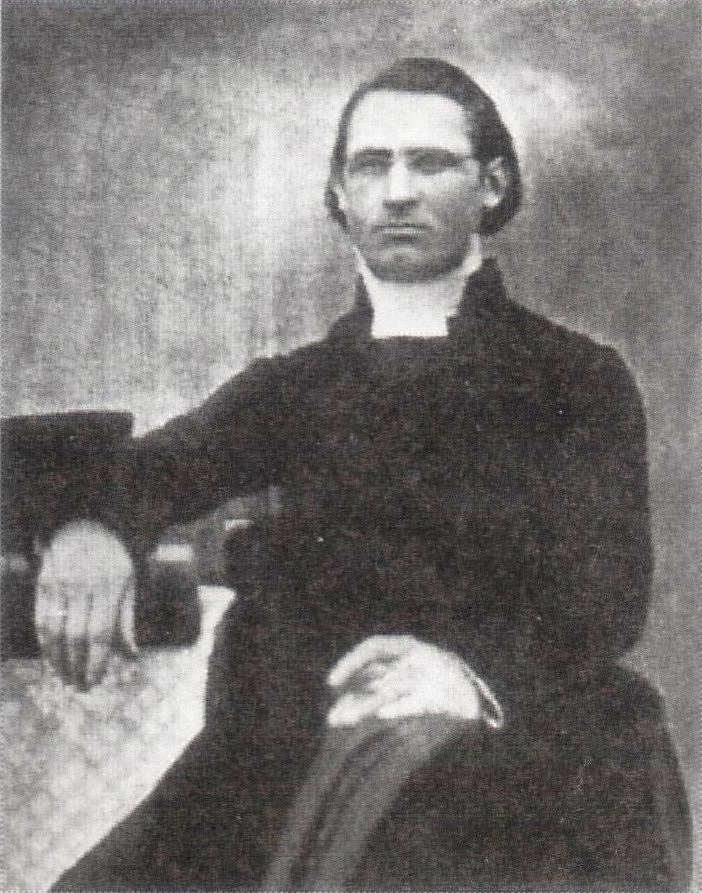
- Born: 23 October 1832; Kuhmoniemi, Grand Duchy of Finland
- Died: 8 September 1873 (aged 40); Haapajärvi, Grand Duchy of Finland
- Occupations: Chaplain; deputy pastor
- Spouse: Amanda Gustava Castrén (m. 1861)
- Children: 5, including Kaarlo Juho

Johan Gabriel Ståhlberg (Finland Swedish: [ˈjuːhɑn ˈgɑːbriel ˈstoːlbærj], 23 October 1832 – 8 September 1873) was a Finnish priest, who worked as a chaplain in Alavieska and as a deputy pastor in Haapajärvi. He is best known as the father of K. J. Ståhlberg, the first president of the Republic of Finland.

== Biography ==
Johan Gabriel Ståhlberg, nicknamed Janne (Finnish: [ˈjɑnːe]), was born on 23 October 1832, in Kuhmoniemi to lensmann Fredrik August Ståhlberg (1790–1880) and Anna Margareta Snellman (1789–1883). His father fought as a lieutenant in the Finnish War in 1808–1809. Johan graduated as a pastor on 18 November 1856 with the grade approbatur cum laude, and was appointed assistant pastor of Pielavesi. He became the assistant pastor of Sotkamo on 22 April 1857, and in Sotkamo he met Amanda Gustafva Castrén, the 16-year-old daughter of the parish clerk, with whom he married on 3 January 1861 in Kajaani. After a year in Sotkamo, Ståhlberg moved to the Kajaani as chaplain's assistant and on 1 September 1858 also to a singing teacher at the Kajaani Music College. He received a power of attorney for that post the same day. He worked as a teacher at the College of Music for almost four years, of which 1859–1860 as principal.

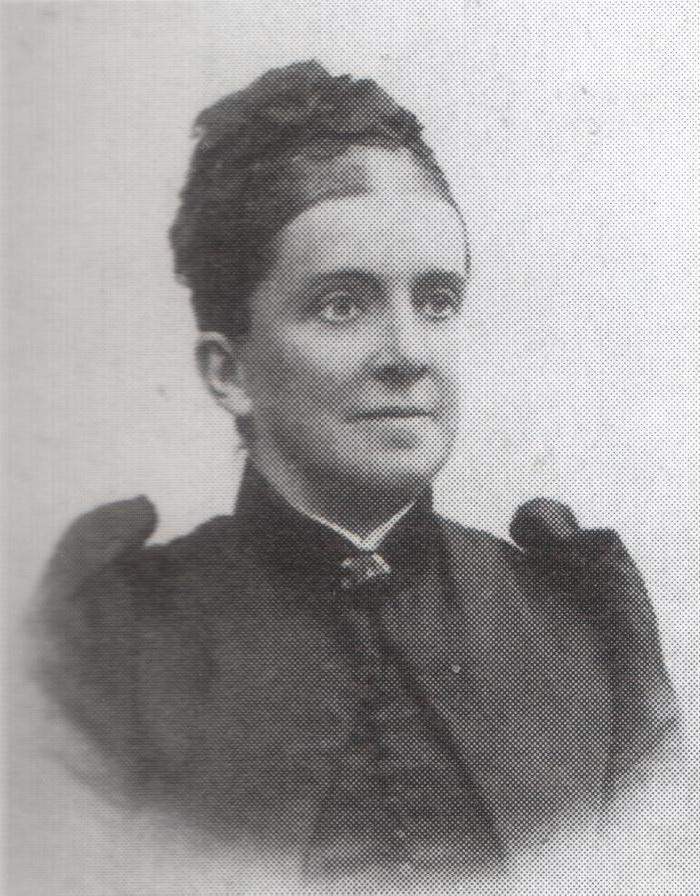
Amanda Gustafva Castrén (1841–1907), the wife of Ståhlberg

After the marriage, on 12 February 1862, the Ståhlbergs moved to Suomussalmi to assist the pastor, who was appointed on 1 September 1863 to also hold the office of priest of Hyrynsalmi. Their first children, Alma and Carl Johan, were born in Suomussalmi. In Carl's year of birth, the family moved to Alavieska. Johan Gabriel Ståhlberg received a power of attorney for the position of chaplain in Alavieska on 1 November 1865. In the same year, the election of the Alavieska cantor was also held. Peter Päivärinta was also among the candidates, and he was nominated for the first election, but Kusti Heikinpoika Schwartzberg was elected. The following year, on 30 November 1866, Ståhlberg had another son, Fredrik.

In Alavieska, the pastor had to see the severity of years of disappearance and great years of famine. The task of a shepherd in a small congregation became heavy. He promised the election of the vicar of the Haapajärvi parish to an extra electorate. Pastor Gustav Leonard Mecklin from Kiuruvesi was nominated for the first election and chaplain Joonas Christian Castrén from Alakiiminki for the second election. The protocol "förof vid kapellens valet i Haapajärvi Moderkyrka" on 14 February 1869 shows that Ståhlberg was chosen as the overwhelming winner: he received about 18½ mantles from the votes cast. Chaplain Castrén received about 2½ mantles and Pastor Mecklin just under ½ mantles. Whether the reason for the overwhelming victory was Ståhlberg's good election sermon or good singing skills as a former music school teacher. The move to Haapajärvi may also have been influenced by the election of Amanda's relative Castrén as a judge of the Haapajärvi's court. The family moved from Alavieska to Haapajärvi in the spring of 1869. On 23 July of the same year, the youngest of the children, Anna Elisabet, was born in Haapajärvi.

During the great years of famine, more than three times the number of parishioners had died compared to normal years. Marriages were abundant after years of famine, when widows also remarried. While in 1866 4,7 marriages were contracted per thousand inhabitants, in 1870 17,9 marriages were contracted per thousand inhabitants. When Pastor Holmström was ill, the vicar Ståhlberg had to take care of the great congregation almost alone, he was completely alone after Pastor Holmström died on 8 August 1871. According to the gracious decision of His Imperial Majesty on 11 May 1868, the chapels of Pidisjärvi and Reisjärvi became independent parishes. At a meeting held in Pappila's yard on 30 August 1871, the parish of 3,400 residents decided to apply for the abolition of the second priesthood and the sale of the pastor's rectory, of which the parishes of Pidisjärvi and Reisjärvi would also participate. The petition was not accepted, so on 21 May 1872 it was decided on the election arrangements for the pastor and the authors of the electoral list.

Deputy vicar Ståhlberg contracted diabetes and died of an outbreak on 8 September 1873. Johan Gabriel Ståhlberg was buried in Haapajärvi. The family received extra years of grace, and widow Amanda paid all the family's debts before the family moved to Oulu in 1879, where the two oldest children had attended school for two years. Widow Amanda got the job of a girls' school janitor and a one-room apartment that not everyone could sleep in, but Carl slept as the eldest son for more than two years in the school hallway. In 1882, the widow got a job from the county lasaret, which eased housing conditions. The children of Pastor Ståhlberg did well in their lives. The eldest son, Carl Johan "Kaarlo Juho" Ståhlberg, became Professor of Law, Speaker of Parliament, President of the Supreme Administrative Court and the first President of the Republic of Finland.

== See also ==
- Henrik Heikel
- Antero Warelius
