= Kopra (surname) =

Kopra is a surname. Notable people with the surname include:

- Jukka Kopra (born 1967), Finnish politician
- Timothy Kopra (born 1963), American astronaut
- Veikko Kopra (1936–2023), Finnish-American historian
