= Ylivieska Airfield =

Ylivieska Airfield Ylivieskan lentokenttä
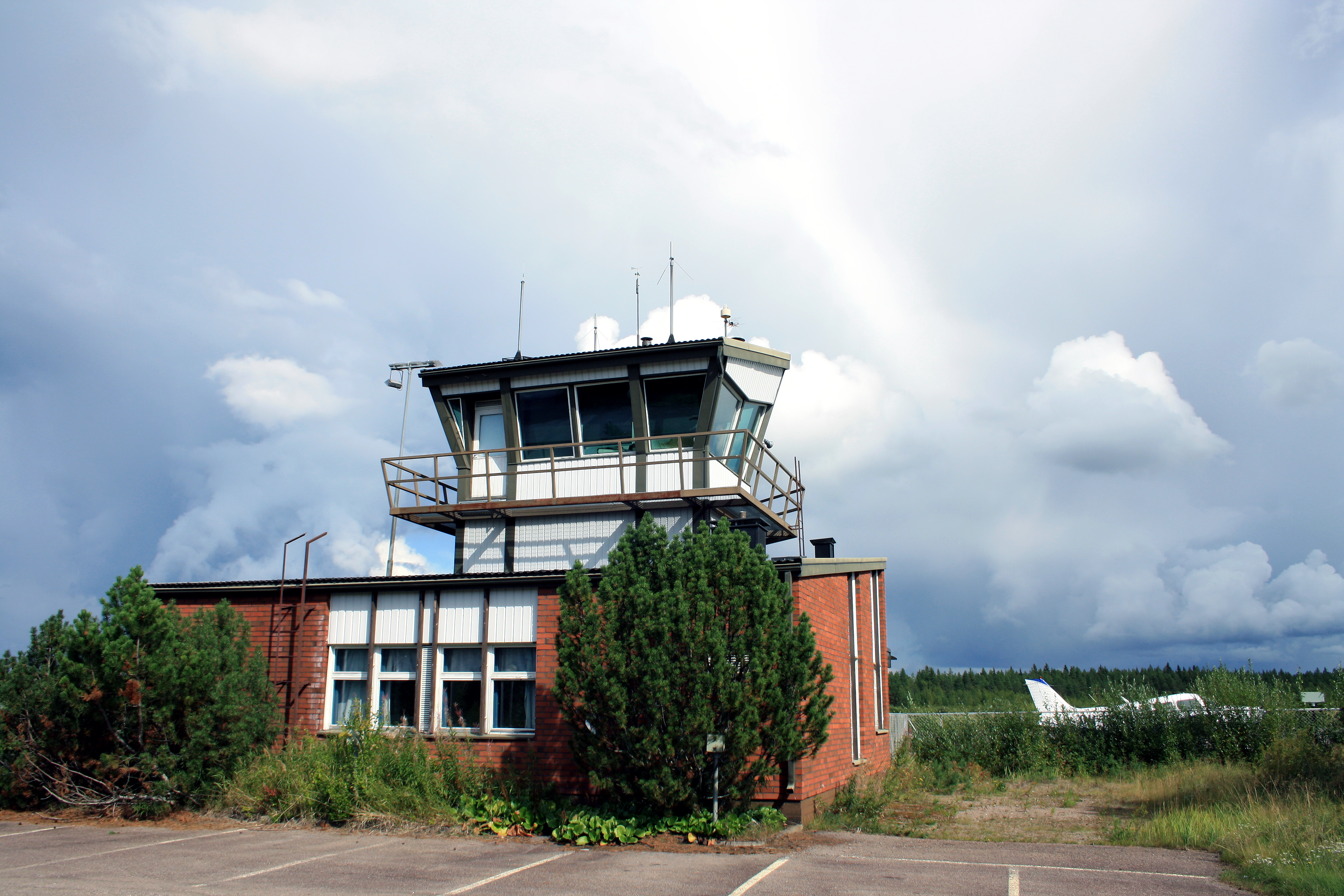
- IATA: YLI; ICAO: EFYL

Summary
- Operator: Town of Ylivieska
- Location: Ylivieska, Finland
- Elevation AMSL: 252 ft / 77 m
- Coordinates: 64°03′17″N 024°43′31″E
- Website: www.ylivieska.fi/...

Map
- Location within Finland

Runways
| Direction | Length | | Surface |
| Direction | m | ft | Surface |
|---|---|---|---|
| 15/33 | 1,500 | 4,921 | asphalt |
- Source: VFR Finland

Ylivieska Airfield (IATA: YLI, ICAO: EFYL) is an aerodrome located in Vähäkangas, Ylivieska, Finland, about 10 kilometres (6 mi) east-southeast of Ylivieska town centre.

The airfield was opened in 1982, and it replaced the old airfield in Niemenkylä. The airport had commercial service until 1996, and the runway was ILS equipped prior to the aerodrome's relegation to uncontrolled status in late 2003.

== See also ==
- List of airports in Finland
