= Central Ostrobothnia =

Region of Finland

Central Ostrobothnia Keski-Pohjanmaa (Finnish) Mellersta Österbotten (Swedish)
- Region
- Region of Central Ostrobothnia; Keski-Pohjanmaan maakunta Landskapet Mellersta Österbotten
- Flag Coat of arms

- Central Ostrobothnia on a map of Finland
- Coordinates: 63°30′N 24°15′E
- Country: Finland
- Historical province: Ostrobothnia
- Capital: Kokkola
- Other town: Kannus

Government
  - Regional Mayor: Jyrki Kaiponen

Area
  - Total: 6,463 km^{2} (2,495 sq mi)

Population (2023)
  - Total: 67,736
  - Density: 13/km^{2} (34/sq mi)

GDP
  - Total: €2.425 billion (2015)
  - Per capita: €35,181 (2015)
- Time zone: UTC+2 (EET)
  - Summer (DST): UTC+3 (EEST)
- ISO 3166 code: FI-07
- NUTS: 1A1
- Regional bird: Skylark (Alauda arvensis)
- Regional fish: European whitefish (Coregonus lavaretus)
- Regional flower: Bluebell (Harebell)
- Regional stone: Gneiss
- Regional lake: Lake Lestijärvi
- Website: keski-pohjanmaa.fi

Central Ostrobothnia (Finnish: Keski-Pohjanmaa; Swedish: Mellersta Österbotten) is a region in Finland. Central Ostrobothnia borders the Bothnian Bay and the regions of Ostrobothnia, North Ostrobothnia, Central Finland and South Ostrobothnia. The regional bird of Central Ostrobothnia is the Eurasian skylark, the regional stone is Gneiss, the regional lake is Lake Lestijärvi, the regional fish is European whitefish. The capital and largest city of the region is Kokkola.

Central Ostrobothnia has an area of 6,462.93 km, of which 5,019.98 km² is land area. Central Ostrobothnia, including the sea areas, is the smallest province in mainland Finland in terms of population and total area, and the second smallest province in Finland after Åland. However, if you count the land area alone, Kymenlaakso is smaller than Central Ostrobothnia.

== Municipalities ==
The region of Central Ostrobothnia consists of two sub-regions and eight municipalities, two of which have city status (marked in bold).

=== Sub-regions ===
Kaustinen sub-region:

- Halsua
- Kaustinen
- Lestijärvi
- Perho
- Toholampi
- Veteli

Kokkola sub-region:

- **Kannus**
- **Kokkola**

=== List of municipalities ===
Coat of arms	Municipality	Population	Land area (km^{2})	Density (/km^{2})	Finnish speakers	Swedish speakers	Other speakers
Coat of arms of Halsua	Halsua	975	413	2	95 %	0 %	5 %
Coat of arms of Kannus	Kannus	5,246	468	11	97 %	0.4 %	3 %
Coat of arms of Kaustinen	Kaustinen	4,074	354	12	95 %	1.9 %	3 %
Coat of arms of Kokkola	Kokkola	48,338	1,446	33	82 %	11.7 %	6 %
Coat of arms of Lestijärvi	Lestijärvi	656	480	1	98 %	0 %	2 %
Coat of arms of Perho	Perho	2,547	748	3	99 %	0.4 %	1 %
Coat of arms of Toholampi	Toholampi	2,750	609	5	97 %	0 %	3 %
Coat of arms of Veteli	Veteli	2,912	502	6	94 %	1.6 %	5 %
	Total	67,498	5,020	13	86 %	9 %	5 %

== Demographics ==
Population size 1990–2025
Year	Population
1990	68,214
1995	69,539
2000	68,052
2005	67,612
2010	68,321
2015	69,032
2020	67,988
2025	67,498

== Politics ==
For parliamentary elections, Central Ostrobothnia, together with the regions of Ostrobothnia and South Ostrobothnia, is part of the Vaasa constituency. As of 2023, the constituency elects 16 of the 200 members of the Parliament of Finland.
