= Petri Tapio Mattson =

Finnish musician

Petri Tapio Mattson (born 1973 in Haapajärvi) is a Finnish violinist and ensemble director specialized in Early music, and a violin maker.

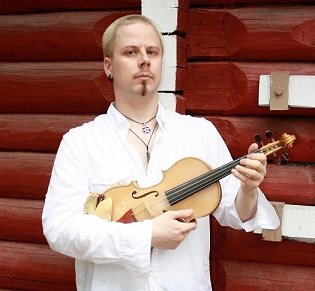
Petri Tapio Mattson

Petri Tapio Mattson studied from 1992 to 1999 at the Sibelius Academy (Helsinki). His teachers included Grazyna Gebert (modern violin), Kreeta-Maria Kentala, Jaap Schröder (Baroque violin), Timo Juntura (viol, chamber music), Rabbe Forsman and Kati Hämäläinen (Early music ensemble performance and performing practices). Between 1998 and 1996 he has also attended master classes given by Gottfried Schneider, David Kim, Zoria Shikmurzajeva (modern violin), Sigiswald Kuijken, Charles Toet and Konrad Hünteler (Early music ensemble performance). His diploma on the Baroque violin, awarded to him in 1999, was the first of its kind at the Sibelius Academy.

Petri Tapio Mattson is the founder of the Early music ensemble Opus X, and has worked as its artistic director from 1995 to 2006 and again from 2009 onwards. From 1999 to 2005 he worked as leader (concert master) for the Sixth Floor Orchestra (now the Finnish Baroque Orchestra). He has also appeared as leader and solo violinist with the Helsinki Baroque Orchestra, the Finnish-Estonian Baroque Orchestra, the Tallinn Baroque Orchestra, Lappeenranta Orchestra and Haapavesi Chamber Orchestra.

In addition to the violin and the viol, Petri Tapio Mattson has also performed on the viola. He has recorded for the labels Alba, BIS, Ondine, Fuga, Naxos, Aeolus and La Bottega Discantica. He has studied violin making under the guidance of luthier Pekka Suihkonen from Haapavesi.
