= Veteli =

Veteli Vetil
- Municipality
- Vetelin kunta Vetils kommun
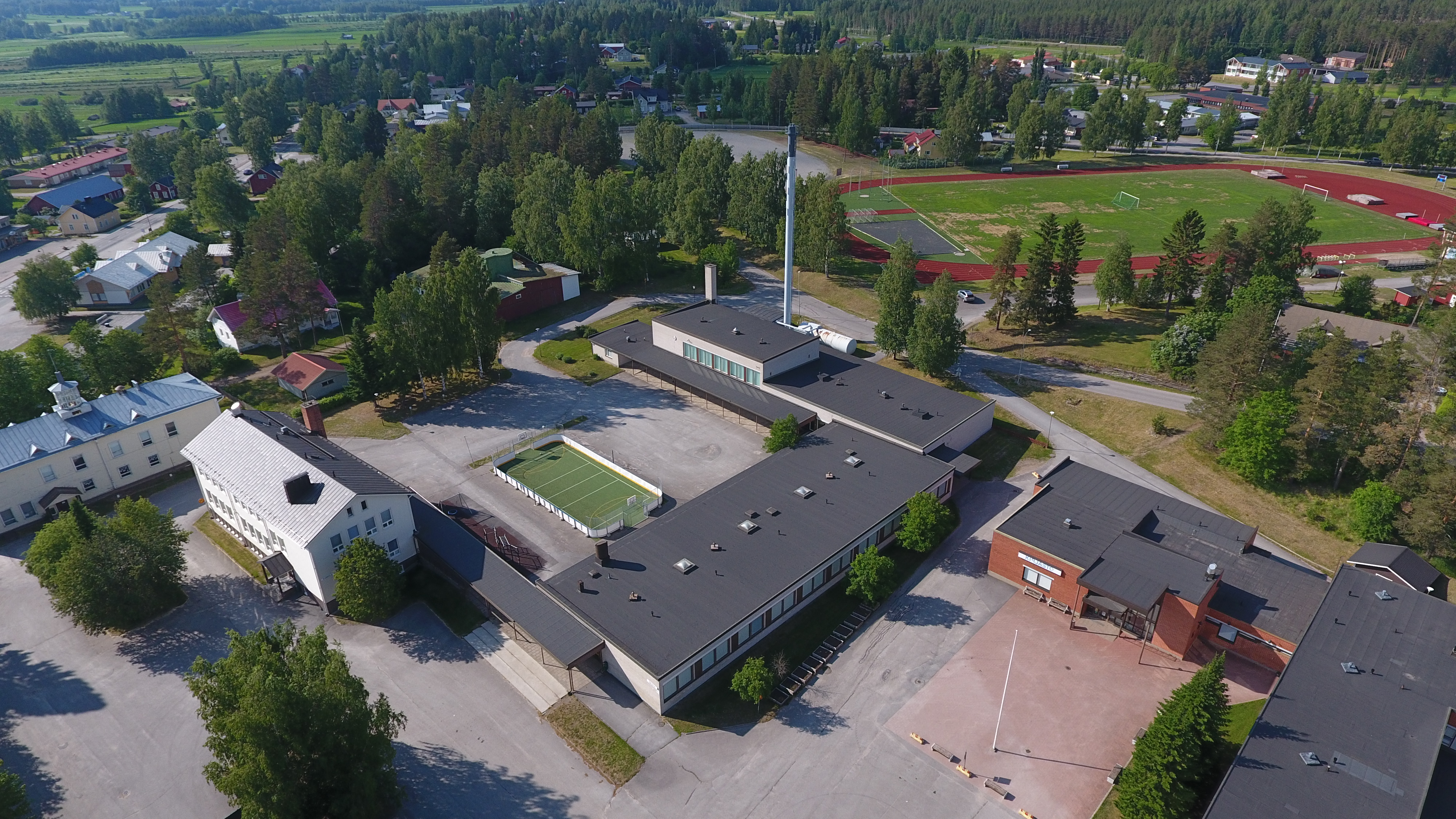
- Veteli High School

- Coat of arms

- Location of Veteli in Finland
- Interactive map of Veteli
- Coordinates: 63°28.5′N 23°47.5′E
- Country: Finland
- Region: Central Ostrobothnia
- Sub-region: Kaustinen sub-region

Government
  - Municipal manager: Hannu Jyrkkä

Area (2018-01-01)
  - Total: 520.91 km^{2} (201.12 sq mi)
  - Land: 502.12 km^{2} (193.87 sq mi)
  - Water: 18.6 km^{2} (7.2 sq mi)
  - Rank: 174th largest in Finland

Population (2025-12-31)
  - Total: 2,912
  - Rank: 216th largest in Finland
  - Density: 5.8/km^{2} (15/sq mi)

Population by native language
  - Finnish: 93.5% (official)
  - Swedish: 1.6%
  - Others: 4.8%

Population by age
  - 0 to 14: 15.7%
  - 15 to 64: 52.9%
  - 65 or older: 31.4%
- Time zone: UTC+02:00 (EET)
  - Summer (DST): UTC+03:00 (EEST)
- Website: veteli.fi

Veteli (Swedish: Vetil) is a municipality of Finland.

It is located in the province of Western Finland and is part of the Central Ostrobothnia region. The municipality had a population of almost 3200 in 2019. and covers an area of 520.91 square kilometres (201.12 sq mi) of which 18.6 km^{2} (7.2 sq mi) is water. The population density is 5.8 inhabitants per square kilometre (15/sq mi).

Neighbouring municipalities are Evijärvi, Halsua, Kaustinen, Kronoby, Lappajärvi, Perho and Vimpeli.

The municipality is unilingually Finnish.

== Notable people ==
- Juha Sipilä, (born 1961), politician, former Prime Minister of Finland (2015–2019),
- Esko Aho, (born 1954), politician, former Prime Minister of Finland (1991–1995)
