= Kinnula =

- Municipality
- Kinnulan kunta Kinnula kommun
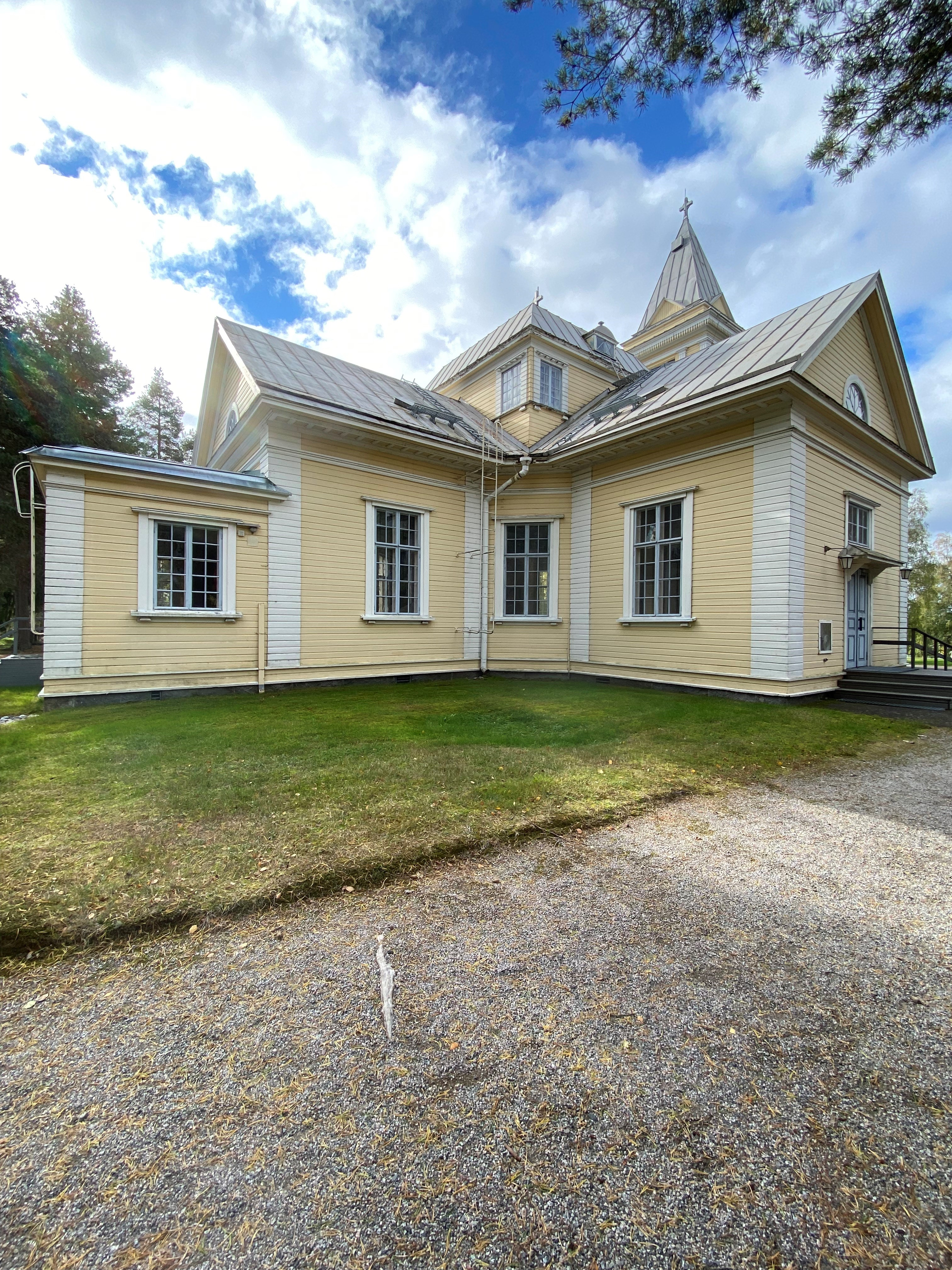
- Kinnula church

- Coat of arms

- Location of Kinnula in Finland
- Interactive map of Kinnula
- Coordinates: 63°22′N 024°58′E
- Country: Finland
- Region: Central Finland
- Sub-region: Saarijärvi–Viitasaari sub-region

Government
  - Municipal manager: Marja Lehtonen

Area (2018-01-01)
  - Total: 495.71 km^{2} (191.39 sq mi)
  - Land: 460.2 km^{2} (177.7 sq mi)
  - Water: 35.48 km^{2} (13.70 sq mi)
  - Rank: 190th largest in Finland

Population (2025-12-31)
  - Total: 1,472
  - Rank: 277th largest in Finland
  - Density: 3.2/km^{2} (8.3/sq mi)

Population by native language
  - Finnish: 98.4% (official)
  - Others: 1.6%

Population by age
  - 0 to 14: 17.4%
  - 15 to 64: 49.2%
  - 65 or older: 33.4%
- Time zone: UTC+02:00 (EET)
  - Summer (DST): UTC+03:00 (EEST)
- Website: www.kinnula.fi

Kinnula is a municipality of Finland. It is located in the Central Finland region. The municipality has a population of 1,472 (31 December 2025) and covers an area of 495.71 square kilometres (191.39 sq mi) of which 35.48 km^{2} (13.70 sq mi) is water. The population density is 3.2 inhabitants per square kilometre (8.3/sq mi).

Neighbouring municipalities are Kivijärvi, Lestijärvi, Perho, Pihtipudas, Reisjärvi and Viitasaari. The municipality is unilingually Finnish.

== Nature ==
There are all together 66 lakes in Kinnula. Biggest lakes are Kivijärvi, Yläjäppä Alajäppä and Iso-Koirajärvi. Salamajärvi National Park is partly located in Kinnula.

== Politics ==
Results of the 2011 Finnish parliamentary election in Kinnula:

- Centre Party 53.2%
- National Coalition Party 14.7%
- Social Democratic Party 13.1%
- The Finns 12.0%
- Left Alliance 3.7%
- Christian Democrats 1.7%
- Green League 0.9%

== Twinnings ==
- Konguta Parish, Estonia
- Trøgstad, Norway

== See also ==
- Finnish national road 58
