= Perho =

- Municipality
- Perhon kunta Perho kommun
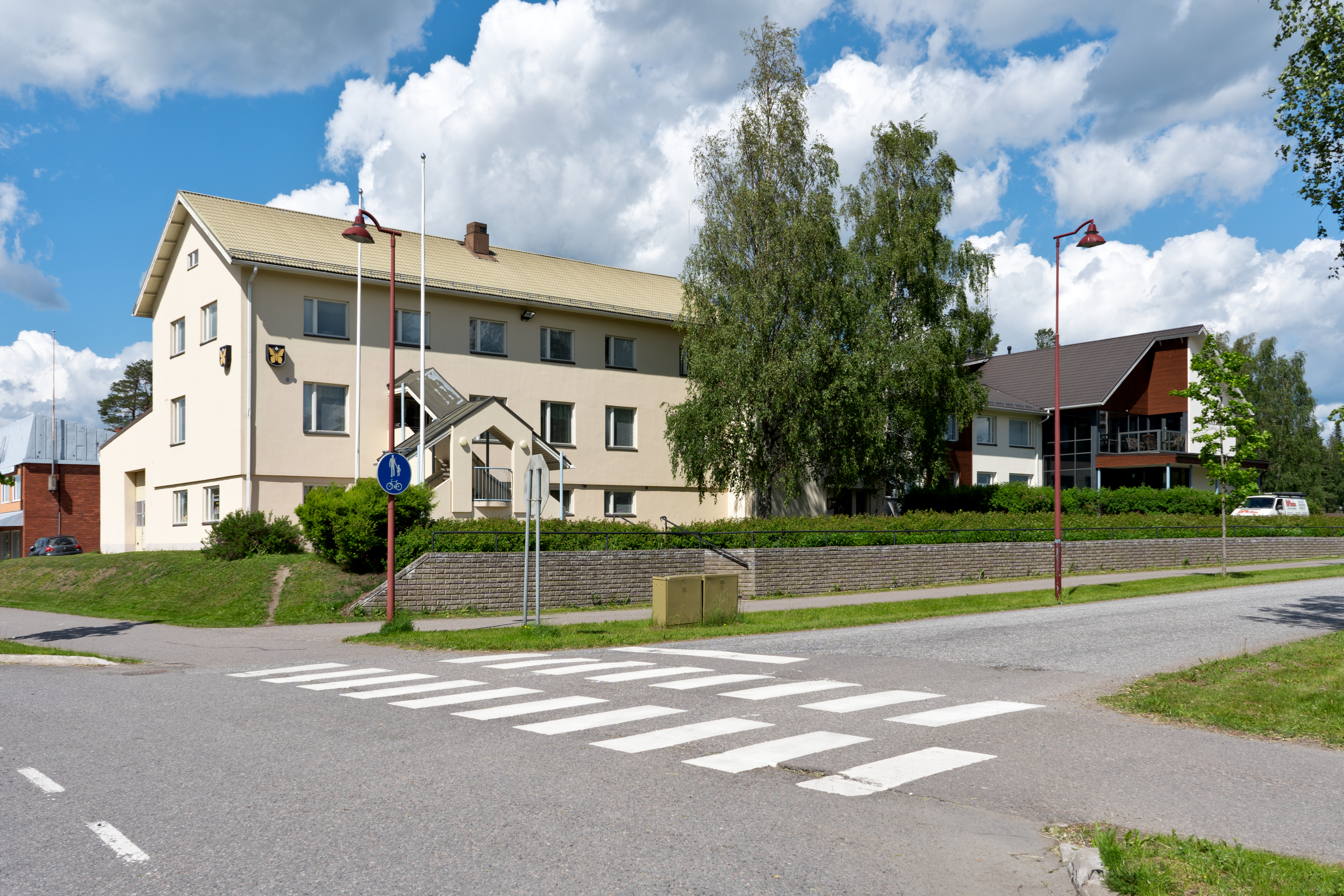
- The municipal office of Perho

- Coat of arms

- Location of Perho in Finland
- Interactive map of Perho
- Coordinates: 63°13′N 024°25′E
- Country: Finland
- Region: Central Ostrobothnia
- Sub-region: Kaustinen sub-region
- Charter: 1868

Government
  - Municipal manager: Lauri Laajala

Area (2018-01-01)
  - Total: 775.19 km^{2} (299.30 sq mi)
  - Land: 747.87 km^{2} (288.75 sq mi)
  - Water: 27.25 km^{2} (10.52 sq mi)
  - Rank: 114th largest in Finland

Population (2025-12-31)
  - Total: 2,547
  - Rank: 231st largest in Finland
  - Density: 3.41/km^{2} (8.8/sq mi)

Population by native language
  - Finnish: 98.5% (official)
  - Swedish: 0.4%
  - Others: 1%

Population by age
  - 0 to 14: 25.5%
  - 15 to 64: 50%
  - 65 or older: 24.6%
- Time zone: UTC+02:00 (EET)
  - Summer (DST): UTC+03:00 (EEST)
- Website: perho.com

Perho is a municipality of Finland. It is located in the province of Western Finland and is part of the Central Ostrobothnia region. The distance between Perho and the regional center Kokkola is about 100 kilometres (62 mi). The municipality has a population of 2,547 (31 December 2025) and covers an area of 775.19 square kilometres (299.30 sq mi) of which 27.25 km^{2} (10.52 sq mi) is water. The population density is 3.41 inhabitants per square kilometre (8.8/sq mi).

The municipality is unilingually Finnish. It neighbourhood municipalities are Alajärvi, Halsua, Kinnula, Kivijärvi, Kyyjärvi, Lestijärvi, Veteli and Vimpeli.

The name of Perho refers to the word perhonen, which means butterfly in Finnish; due to this, the golden butterfly appears in the coat of arms of the municipality. In the same coat of arms, the silver "nail cross" above the butterfly refers to J. L. Runeberg's poem The Tomb in Perho. The coat of arms was designed by Gustaf von Numers and was confirmed for use on March 6, 1953.

== History ==
In 1860, the large parish of Kokkola, which covers almost present-day Central Ostrobothnia, disintegrated and the parish of Veteli, which included the smaller parishes of Kaustinen, Halsua and Perho, was separated from it. Perho officially became a chapel parish five years later. Perho became an independent parish in 1879, and the first pastor took office in 1885. The first public library in the Kokkola region was established in Perho. Preacher Emanuel Snellman, locksmith Erkki Lakanen and Tuomas Taittonen were the handlers. As the former librarian of Vähäkyrö's library in the 1850s, Taittonen had made it the largest public library in the country.

== Transport ==
Highway 13, which connects the Central Finland region and the town of Kokkola, passes through Perho and also serves as a main street of village. There are two roundabouts in the village center.

Perho is served by OnniBus.com route Helsinki—Jyväskylä—Kokkola.

== Culture ==
=== Food ===
In the 1980s, turnip rieskas, flour-potato porridge and mashed lingonberry sauce were named Perho's traditional parish dishes.

== Notable people ==
- Arsi Harju (born 1974), former track and field athlete
- Rami Hietaniemi (born 1982), wrestler
- Lauri Linna (1930–2018), politician
- Marita Liulia (born 1957), visual artist
- Eero Tuomaala (1926–1988), long-distance runner

== Twinnings ==
- Antsla, Estonia

== Gallery ==
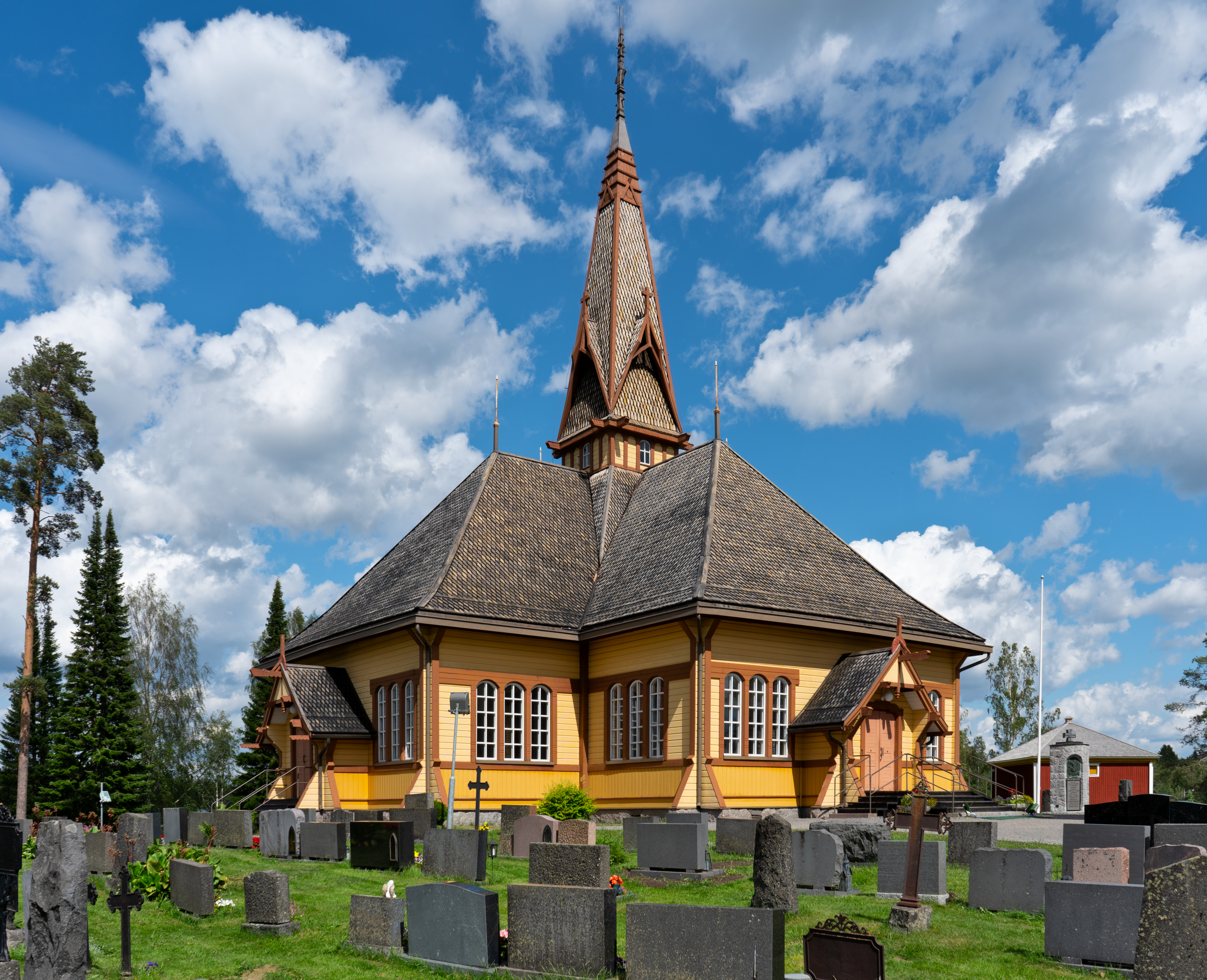
Perho church

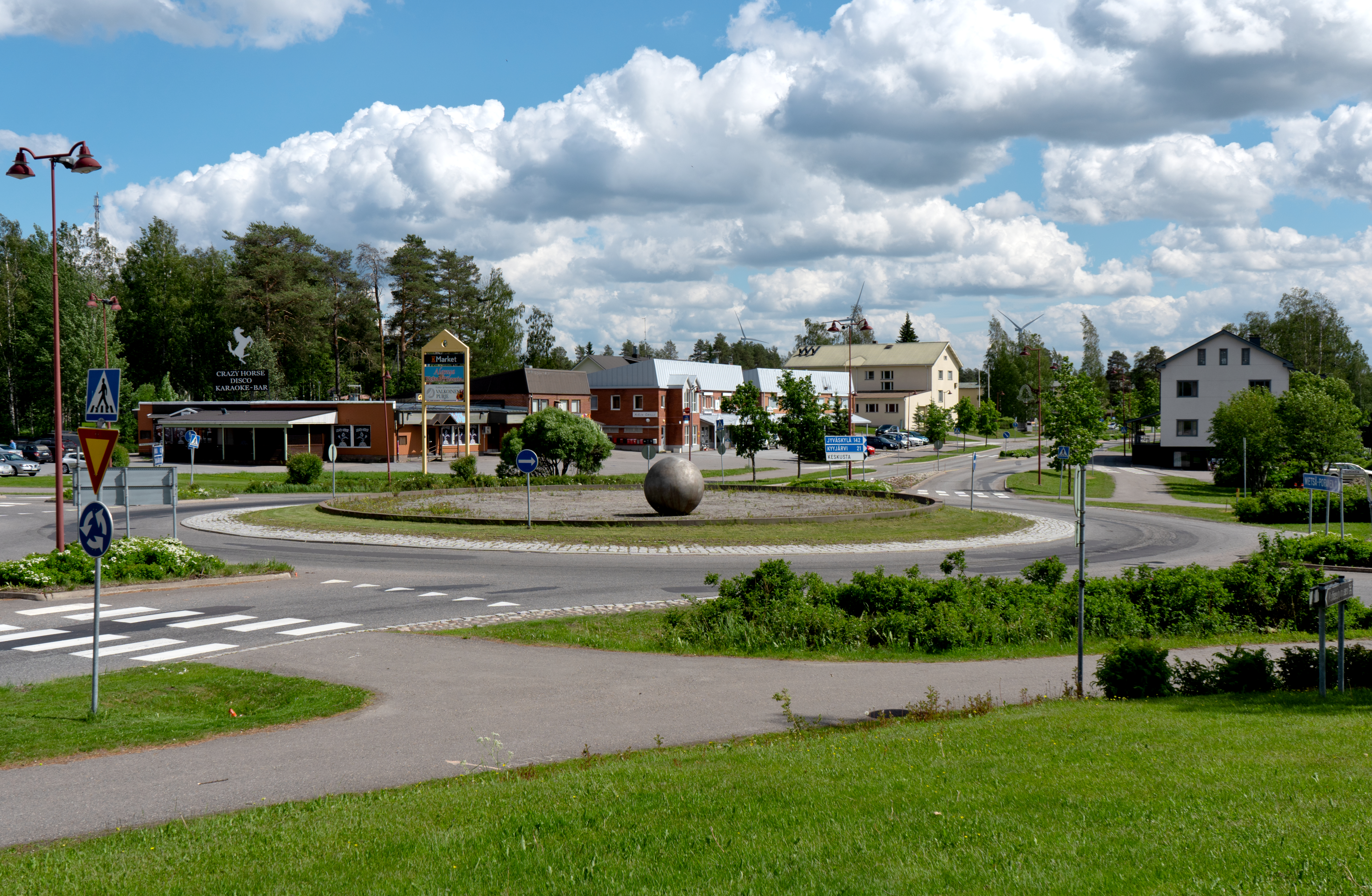
A roundabout in the village center

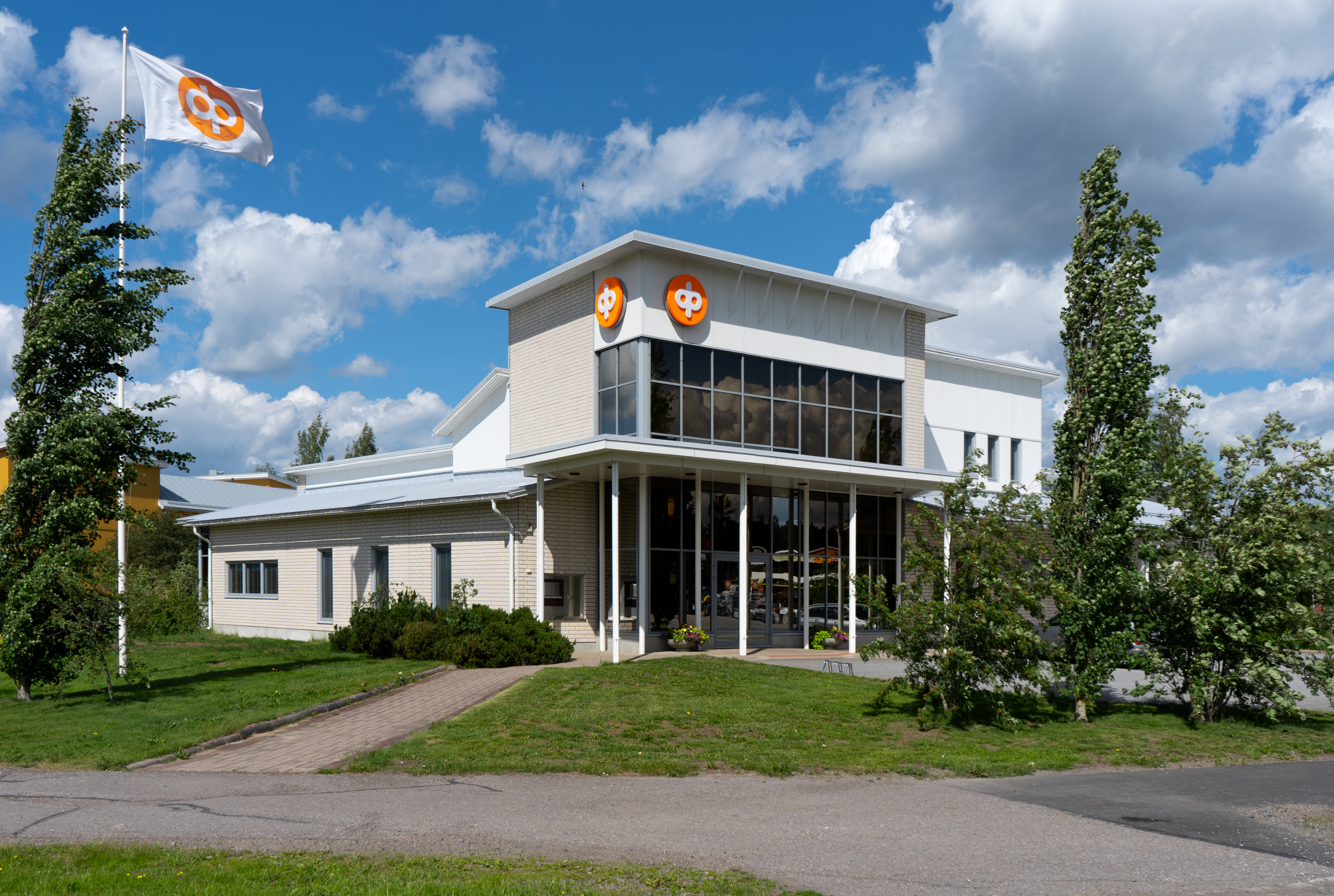
Osuuspankki bank

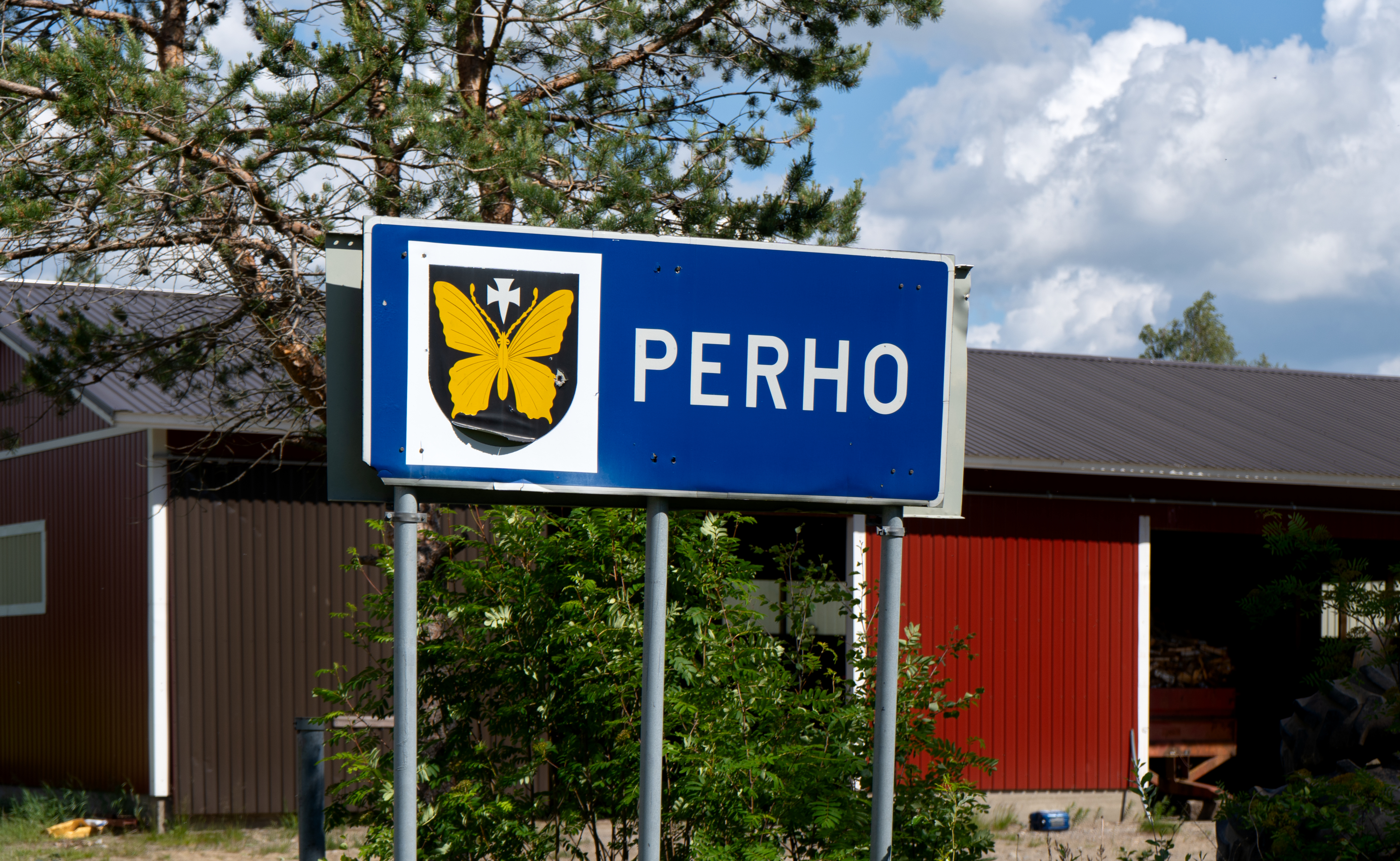
Perho's municipality border

== See also ==
- Perho River
