= Halsuanjoki =

Location
- Country: Finland

Physical characteristics
- Mouth
  - coordinates: 63°25′18″N 23°48′58″E
- Length: 17 km (11 mi)

Halsuanjoki is a tributary river of Perhonjoki in Finland. Its source is Halsuanjärvi. There are several rapids in this river.

== See also ==
- Halsua
- List of rivers of Finland
