= Finnish national road 58 =

Road in Finland

Highway 58
- Kantatie 58 (Finnish); Stamväg 58 (Swedish)
- Suomenselkätie
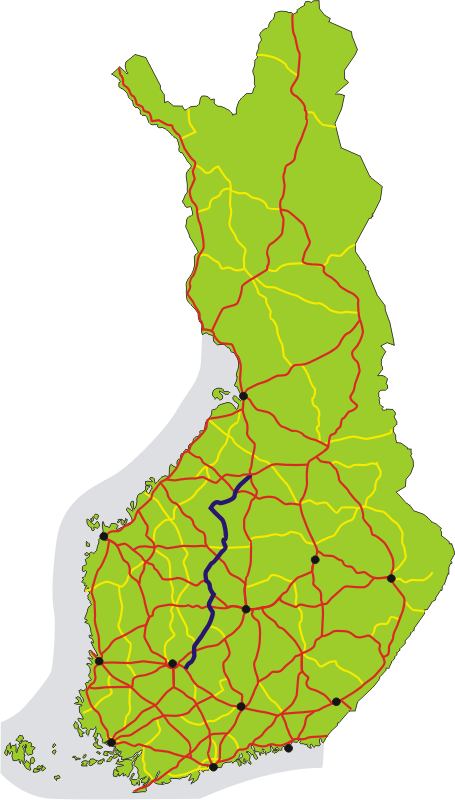

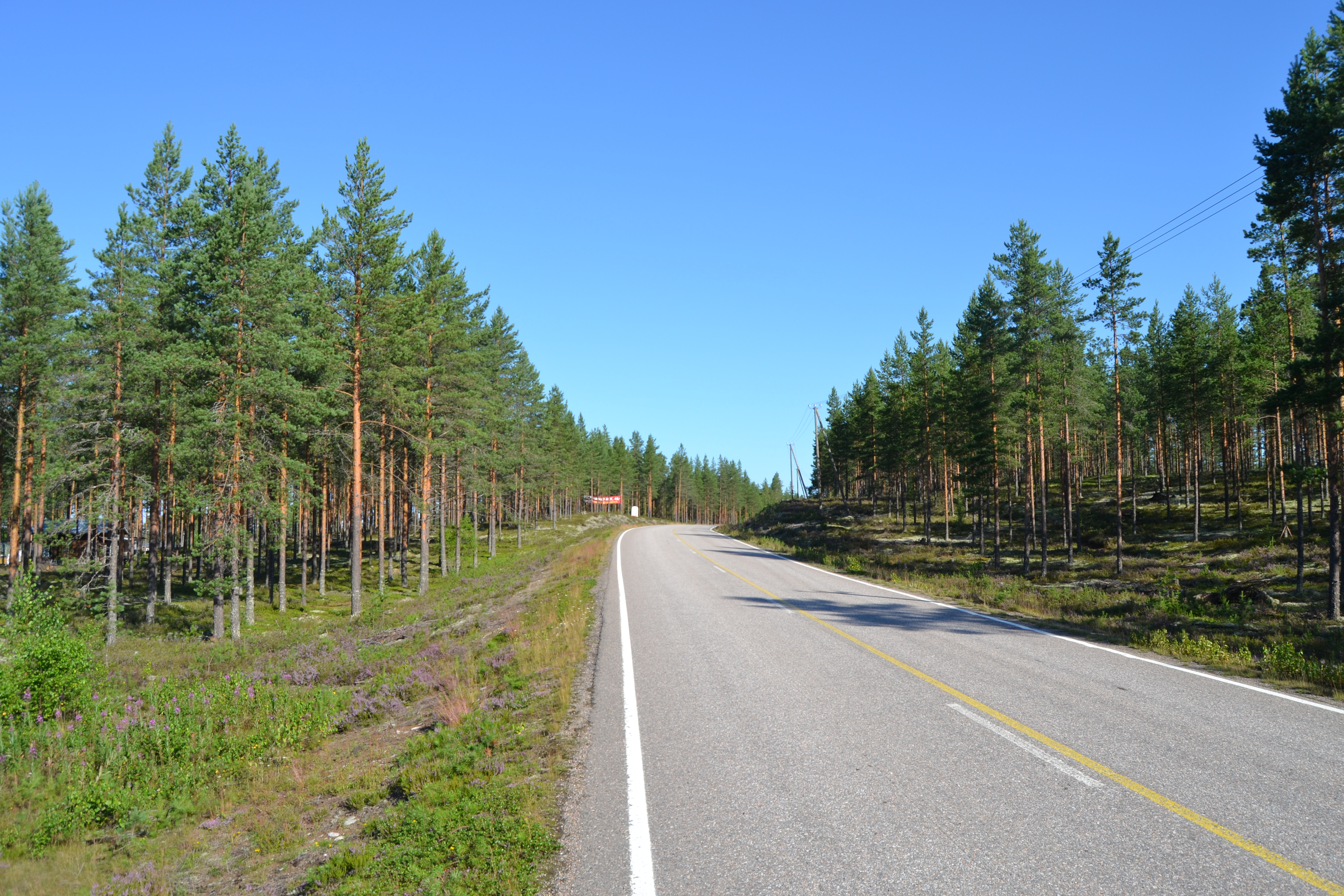

Route information
- Maintained by the Finnish Transport Agency
- Length: 385 km (239 mi)
- Existed: 1977–present

Major junctions
- From: Kangasala
- To: Kärsämäki

Location
- Country: Finland
- Major cities: Jämsä

Highway system
- Highways in Finland
← Kt 57	→ Kt 59

The Finnish national road 58 (Finnish: Kantatie 58; Swedish: Stamväg 58) is the main road from Kangasala to Kärsämäki via Orivesi, Jämsä, Keuruu, Karstula, Kinnula and Haapajärvi. The road is also called Suomenselkätie ("Suomenselkä road") and has been marketed as an alternative road connection to Highways 4 and 9. The length of the road is about 385 kilometres (239 mi), which makes it the longest 2nd class main route in Finland.

The road is a two-lane road all the way, the quality of which varies greatly; only the section between Orivesi and Keuruu is at the highway level. Other sections are former regional roads, which in many places are considerably narrow, winding and hilly as main roads. The road also passes through several small urban areas. The road is only partially permanently paved, between Keuruu and Reisjärvi the road is mostly lightly paved. On the other hand, road traffic volumes are mainly quite low, especially north of Keuruu. In addition, the road has a total of up to 13 discontinuities, where the main road turns at the junction. Between Multia and Pylkönmäki, main road 58 is marked in the Central Finland's regional plan for the new alignment, and regional road 636 between Pylkönmäki and Karstula will be converted into main road 58. The section between Kinnula and Reisjärvi has been marked for shortening in the new guidelines in the regional plans of Central Finland and North Ostrobothnia.

== History ==
=== Old route ===
In the 1938 road numbering system, main road 58 was the road between Lahti and Padasjoki, but after the completion of the Helsinki–Lahti road, national road 4 was rerouted to run through Lahti and road number 58 was dropped.

=== Current route ===
The road between Orivesi and Keuruu began to be built in the 1960s and was completed at the turn of the 1960s and 1970s. The Orivesi–Mänttä section, which was built from 1961, was opened in November 1966, despite being unfinished. This was numbered as regional road 341 upon completion, and was upgraded to a main road in 1977 and numbered as main road 58, restoring the number. In the 1996 renumbering, the section from Keuruu to Karstula became part of main road 58, replacing regional roads 622 and 634. The sections between Kangasala and Orivesi (former regional road 324) and Karstula and Kärsämäki (former regional roads 646, 775, 751, 761 and 768) were renumbered a few years later.

== Route ==
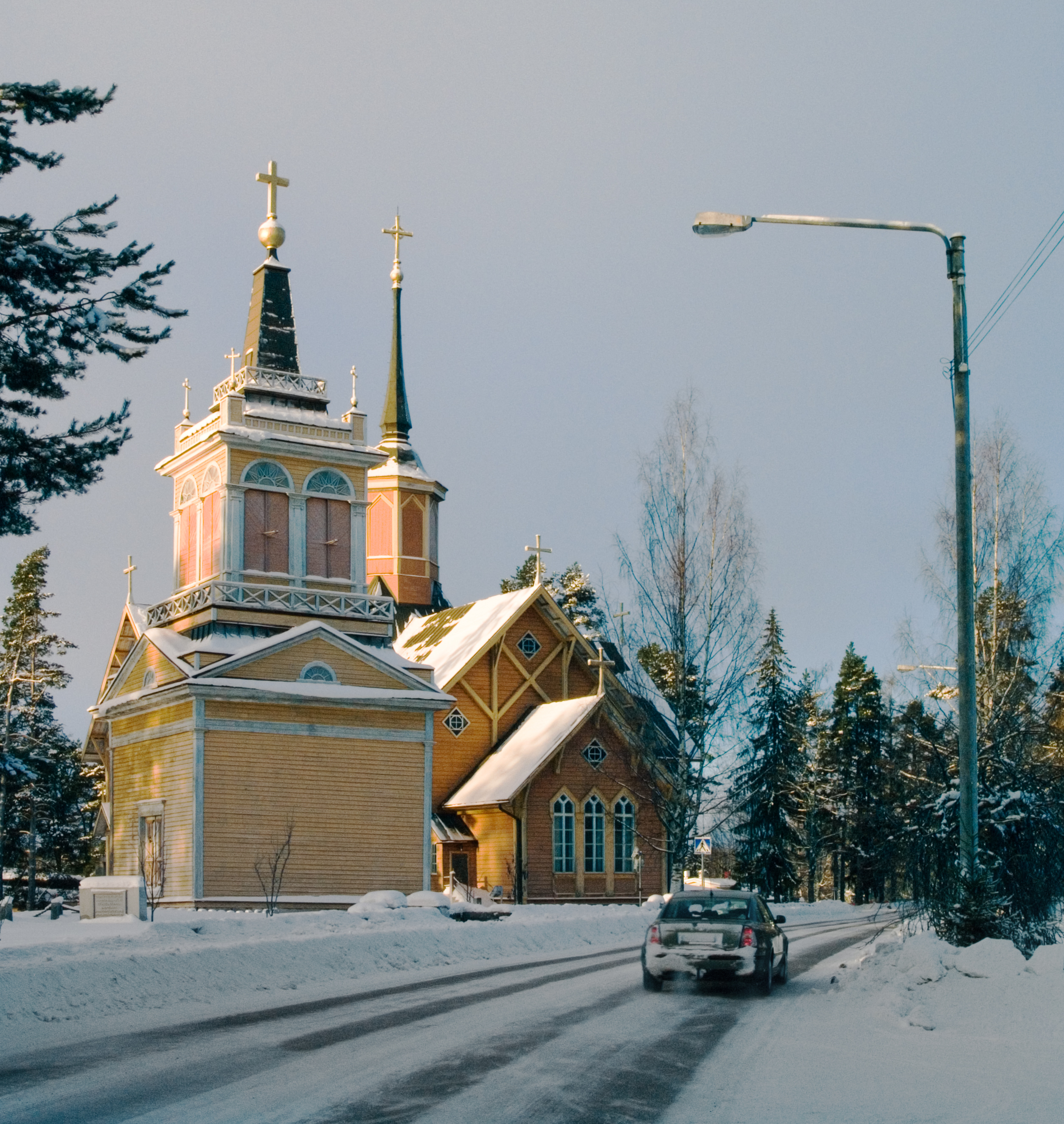
Main route 58 passing the church of Kivijärvi

The road passes through the following localities:

- Kangasala (Huutijärvi)
- Orivesi (Orivesi and Hirsilä)
- Juupajoki (Korkeakoski and Lyly)
- Jämsä
- Mänttä-Vilppula
- Jämsä
- Mänttä-Vilppula (Mänttä)
- Keuruu (Pohjoislahti and Keuruu)
- Multia (Multia and Väätäiskylä)
- Ähtäri
- Multia
- Ähtäri
- Saarijärvi
- Karstula
- Saarijärvi
- Karstula (Karstula and Humppi)
- Kivijärvi
- Kinnula
- Lestijärvi
- Reisjärvi
- Haapajärvi
- Kärsämäki

== See also ==
- Finnish national road 4
