= Lake Lestijärvi =

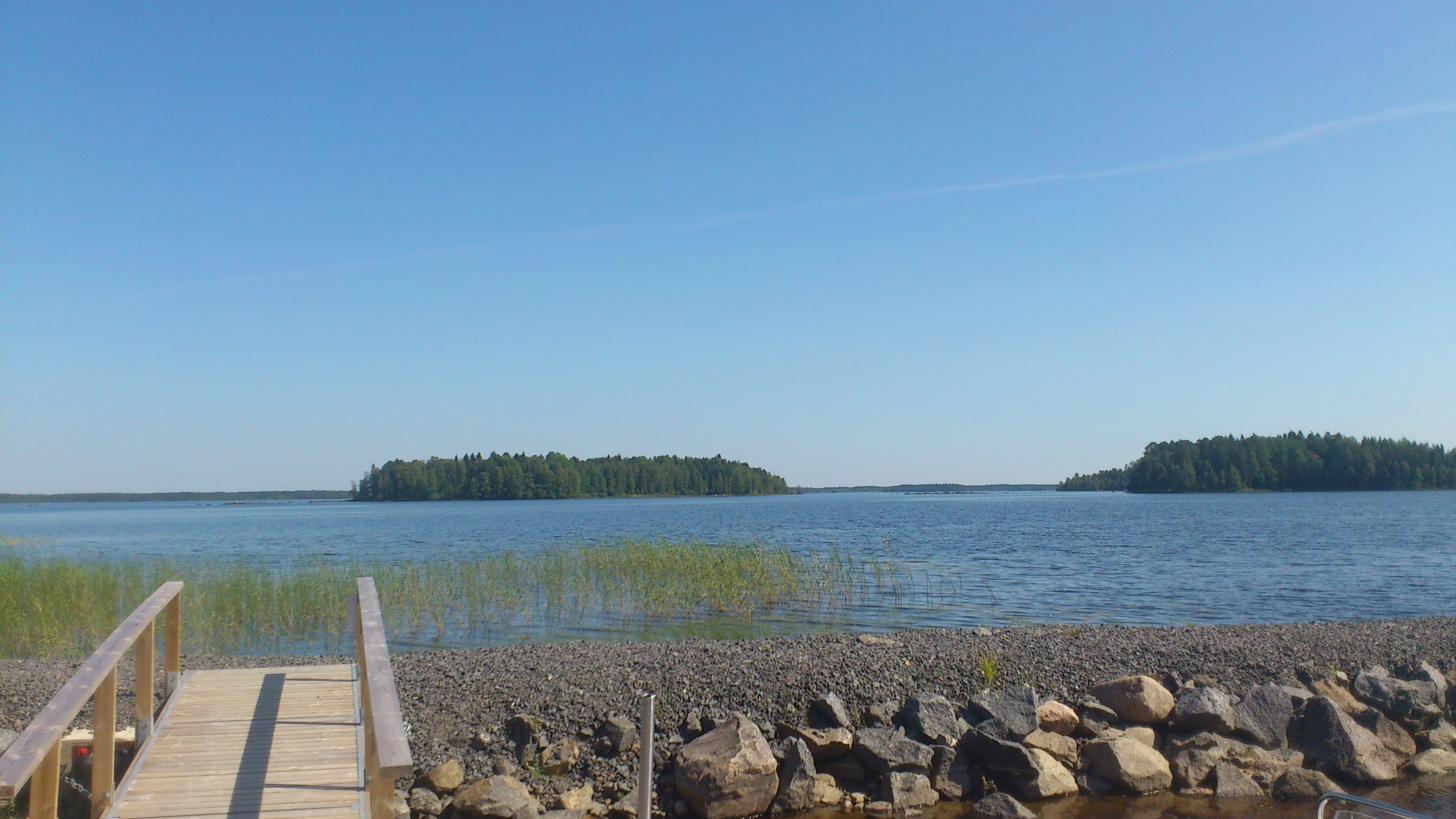
- Lake Lestijärvi - Taken from the fishing harbor beside the center of the municipality of Lestijärvi.

- Location within Finland
- Coordinates: 63°31′N 24°46′E
- Type: Lake
- Catchment area: Lestijoki
- Basin countries: Finland
- Max. length: 12.95 km (8.05 mi)
- Max. width: 8.15 km (5.06 mi)
- Surface area: 64.74 km^{2} (25.00 sq mi)
- Average depth: 3.57 m (11.7 ft)
- Max. depth: 6.9 m (23 ft)
- Water volume: 0.231 km^{3} (187,000 acre⋅ft)
- Shore length^{1}: 113.8 km (70.7 mi)
- Surface elevation: 140.8 m (462 ft)
- Frozen: December–April
- Islands: Nevansaari, Vasikkasaari and several other islands and islets
- ^{1} Shore length is not a well-defined measure.

Lake Lestijärvi is a medium-sized lake, located in Lestijärvi, Central Ostrobothnia, Finland. It is the 64th largest lake in Finland. Lake Lestijärvi is a well-known site for fishing perch and pike. All the region's lakes are shallow, Lestijärvi included.

== See also ==
- List of lakes in Finland
