= Halsua =

Halsua Halso
- Municipality
- Halsuan kunta Halso kommun
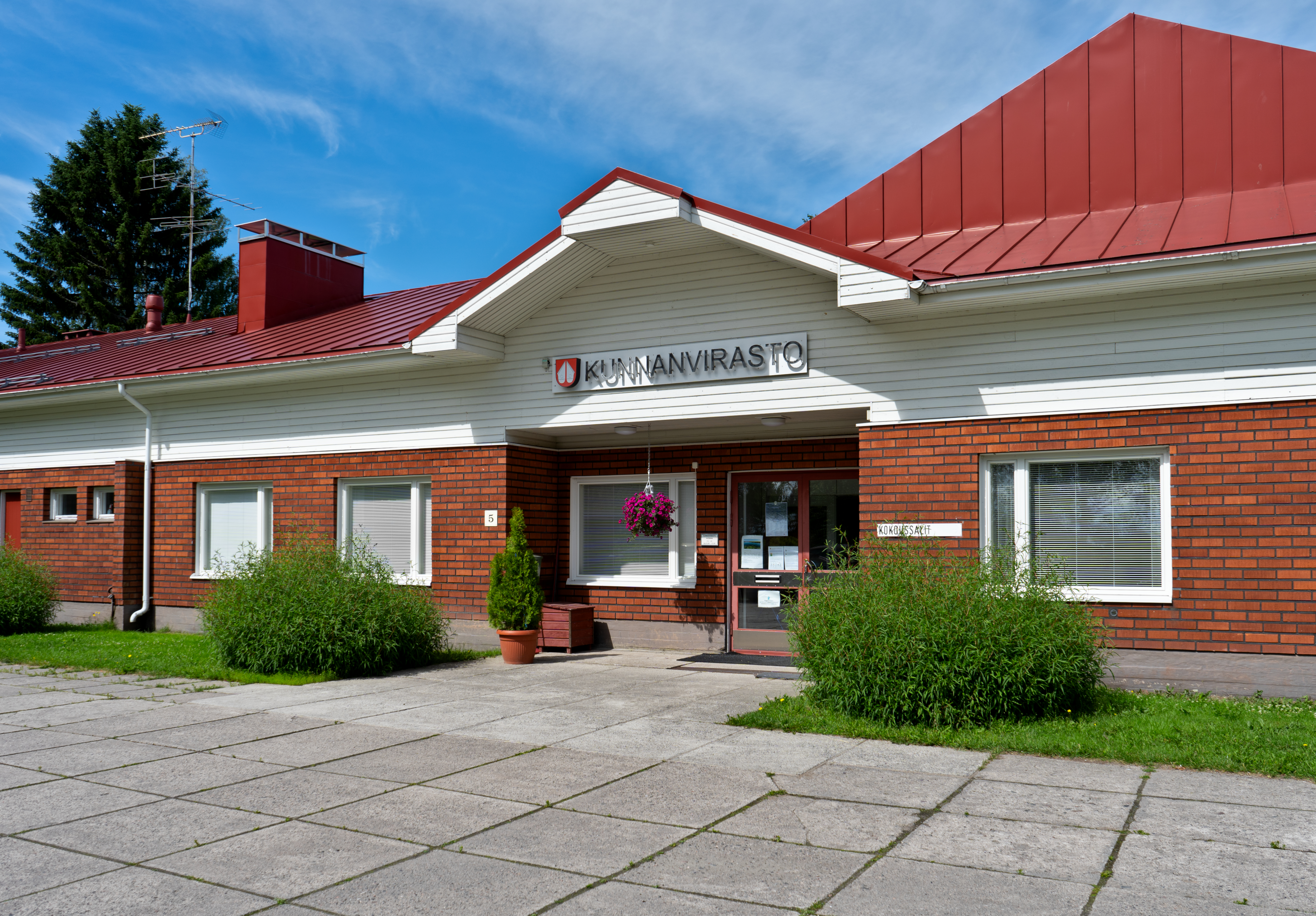
- Halsua municipal office

- Coat of arms

- Location of Halsua in Finland
- Interactive map of Halsua
- Coordinates: 63°27.8′N 024°10′E
- Country: Finland
- Region: Central Ostrobothnia
- Sub-region: Kaustinen sub-region
- Charter: 1868

Government
  - Municipal manager: Kalevi Lindfors

Area (2018-01-01)
  - Total: 428.34 km^{2} (165.38 sq mi)
  - Land: 413.01 km^{2} (159.46 sq mi)
  - Water: 15.63 km^{2} (6.03 sq mi)
  - Rank: 201st largest in Finland

Population (2025-12-31)
  - Total: 975
  - Rank: 293rd largest in Finland
  - Density: 2.36/km^{2} (6.1/sq mi)

Population by native language
  - Finnish: 95.5% (official)
  - Others: 4.5%

Population by age
  - 0 to 14: 13.3%
  - 15 to 64: 52%
  - 65 or older: 34.6%
- Time zone: UTC+02:00 (EET)
  - Summer (DST): UTC+03:00 (EEST)
- Website: halsua.fi

Halsua (Swedish: Halso) is a municipality of Finland.

Halsua is located in the province of Western Finland and is part of the Central Ostrobothnia region. The municipality has a population of 975 in 2025 and covers an area of 428.34 square kilometres (165.38 sq mi) of which 15.63 km^{2} (6.03 sq mi) is water. The population density is 2.36 inhabitants per square kilometre (6.1/sq mi).

Neighbouring municipalities are Kaustinen, Kokkola, Lestijärvi, Perho and Veteli.

The municipality is unilingually Finnish.

== See also ==
- Halsuanjoki
