= Arthur Aspelin =

Lieutenant Colonel Gustaf Arthur Aspelin (2 February 1868 - 22 September 1949) was an officer in the Military of the Grand Duchy of Finland, in the Imperial Russian Army and in the Finnish Defence Forces, a lawyer and a politician.

Aspelin was born, in Lestijärvi. He was a member of the Parliament of Finland from 1922 to 1924, representing the National Progressive Party.
