= Toholampi =

- Municipality
- Toholammin kunta Toholampi kommun
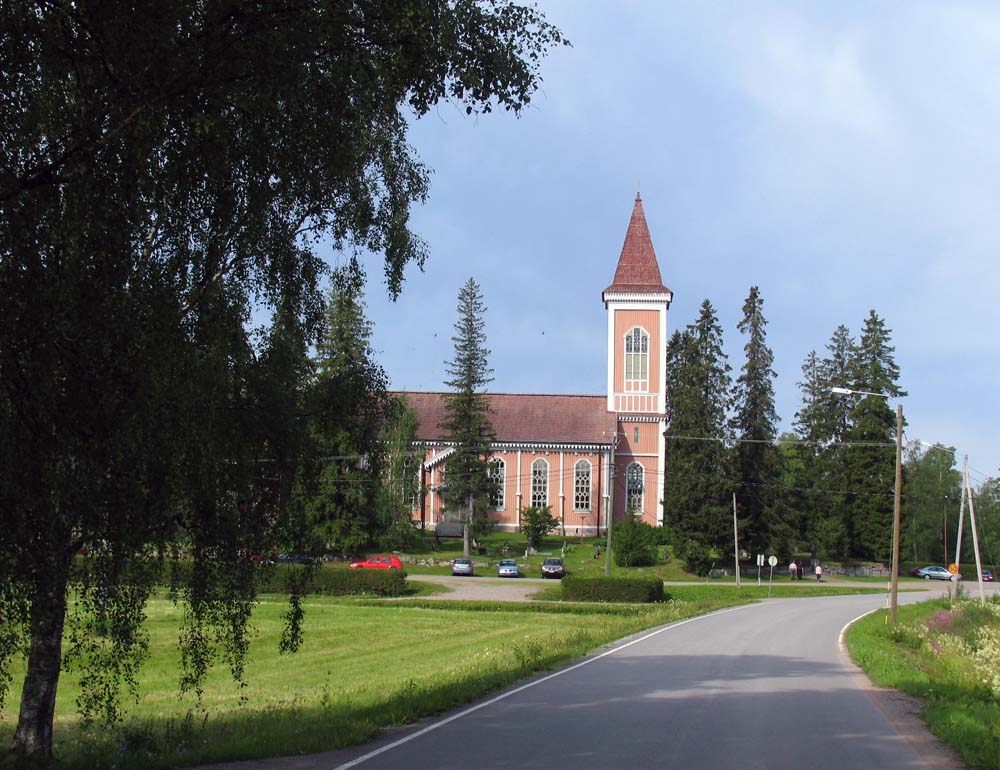
- Toholampi church

- Coat of arms

- Location of Toholampi in Finland
- Interactive map of Toholampi
- Coordinates: 63°46.5′N 024°15′E
- Country: Finland
- Region: Central Ostrobothnia
- Sub-region: Kaustinen sub-region
- Charter: 1865

Government
  - Municipal manager: Jukka Hillukkala

Area (2018-01-01)
  - Total: 616.89 km^{2} (238.18 sq mi)
  - Land: 609.16 km^{2} (235.20 sq mi)
  - Water: 8.45 km^{2} (3.26 sq mi)
  - Rank: 139th largest in Finland

Population (2025-12-31)
  - Total: 2,750
  - Rank: 223rd largest in Finland
  - Density: 4.51/km^{2} (11.7/sq mi)

Population by native language
  - Finnish: 97.3% (official)
  - Others: 2.7%

Population by age
  - 0 to 14: 18.3%
  - 15 to 64: 53.7%
  - 65 or older: 28.1%
- Time zone: UTC+02:00 (EET)
  - Summer (DST): UTC+03:00 (EEST)
- Website: www.toholampi.fi

Toholampi is a municipality of Finland.

It is located in the Central Ostrobothnia region. The municipality has a population of 2,750 (31 December 2025) and covers an area of 616.89 square kilometres (238.18 sq mi) of which 8.45 km^{2} (3.26 sq mi) is water. The population density is 4.51 inhabitants per square kilometre (11.7/sq mi). Neighbouring municipalities are Kannus, Kokkola, Lestijärvi and Sievi.

The municipality is unilingually Finnish.

== Notable people ==
- Mika Lintilä, politician
- Hannu Hirvikoski, writer
- Pekka Jylhä, sculptor
- Mauri Leppänen, volleyballer
- Virve Nuotio, soloist
- Samsa Tuikka, runner
- Teemu Wirkkala, javelin thrower
- Albert Gebhard, painter
