= Reisjärvi =

Municipality in North Ostrobothnia, Finland

- Municipality
- Reisjärven kunta Reisjärvi kommun
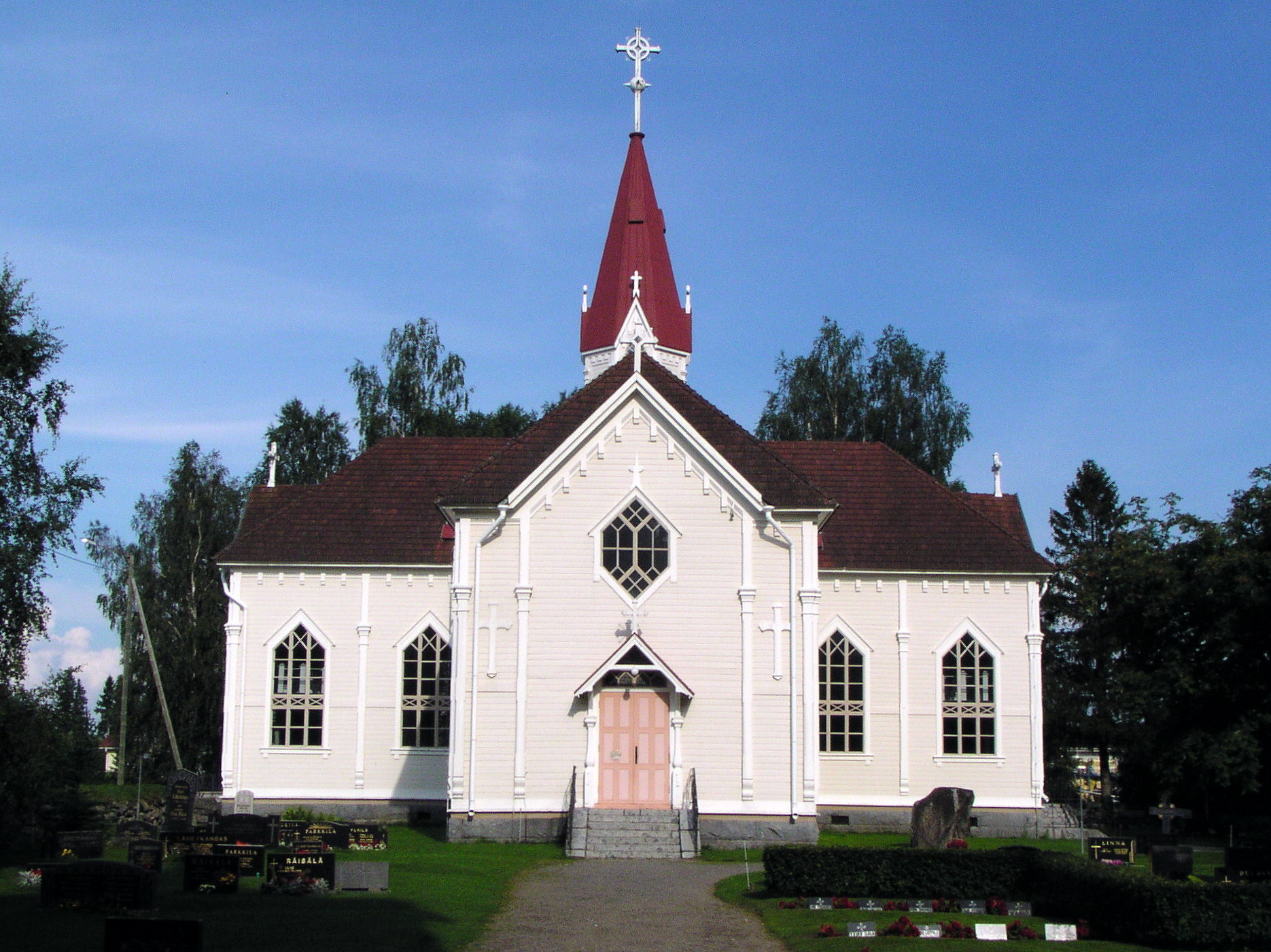
- Reisjärvi Church

- Coat of arms

- Location of Reisjärvi in Finland
- Interactive map of Reisjärvi
- Coordinates: 63°36.3′N 24°56′E
- Country: Finland
- Region: North Ostrobothnia
- Sub-region: Nivala–Haapajärvi
- Charter: 1868

Government
  - Municipal manager: Marjut Silvast

Area (2018-01-01)
  - Total: 503.19 km^{2} (194.28 sq mi)
  - Land: 474.39 km^{2} (183.16 sq mi)
  - Water: 28.81 km^{2} (11.12 sq mi)
  - Rank: 183rd largest in Finland

Population (2025-12-31)
  - Total: 2,476
  - Rank: 233rd largest in Finland
  - Density: 5.22/km^{2} (13.5/sq mi)

Population by native language
  - Finnish: 99.5% (official)
  - Others: 0.5%

Population by age
  - 0 to 14: 18.7%
  - 15 to 64: 53.9%
  - 65 or older: 27.4%
- Time zone: UTC+02:00 (EET)
  - Summer (DST): UTC+03:00 (EEST)
- Website: www.reisjarvi.fi

Reisjärvi (Finnish pronunciation: [ˈrei̯sˌjærʋi]) is a municipality of Finland. It is located in the province of Oulu and is part of the Northern Ostrobothnia region. The municipality has a population of 2,476 (31 December 2025) and covers an area of 503.19 square kilometres (194.28 sq mi) of which 28.81 km^{2} (11.12 sq mi) is water. The population density is 5.22 inhabitants per square kilometre (13.5/sq mi). The municipality is unilingually Finnish.

The silver, five-pronged trident blade featured in the coat of arms is inspired by the ancient significance of inland lake fishing. The coat of arms was designed by Gustaf von Numers and was approved by the Reisjärvi municipal council on 26 June 1952. The Ministry of the Interior confirmed the coat of arms for use on 3 November of the same year.

== Geography ==
Neighbouring municipalities are Haapajärvi, Kinnula, Lestijärvi, Pihtipudas and Sievi.

The habitation in Reisjärvi is clustered into villages ("kylä"). The locals might recognize at least the following villages: Keskusta (the center), Hylkiranta, Järvikylä, Kalaja, Kangaskylä, Kinnulanranta, Kiljanranta, Köyhänperä, Leppälahti, Levonperä, Lokkiperä, Metsäperä, Mäntyperä and Räisälänmäki.

Reisjärvi has a highly diverse nature, with many lakes, ponds and smaller rivers, rocks and cliffs but also marshes and lowlands.

A sight of Reisjärvi nature is one of the northernmost in Finland habitats of wild Small-leaved Lime (Tilia cordata), 63° 38′ N (right after the northernmost reliably confirmed natural habitats in the municipality of Sonkajärvi in the vicinity of the lake of Kangaslampi, 63° 45′ N and near the hill of Salmisenmäki, 63° 43′ 42" N). Seven long-boled lime trees grow in a mixed forest on the Kokkoniemi cape at Lake Pitkäjärvi. The site is in private possession but it is a grove of national significance which has been under state protection since 13.04.1989. Following the Peuranpolku ("deer's path") trailing route, which begins in Reisjärvi, provides an excellent view into the landscape of the area. The cliffs and rock fields of the Raura area have been shaped by the ice age.

== Politics ==
Reisjärvi has traditionally been a strong area for the Centre Party. For example, in the first round of 2006 presidential elections, the Centre Party candidate Matti Vanhanen got 57.1% of all votes from Reisjärvi. The municipal council of Reisjärvi is also dominated by the Centre Party: in the period 2004–2008 it held 15 positions against 4 positions for National Coalition Party and 1 for Social Democrats and Left Alliance each.

== Events ==
- The Finnish Porcelain Summer, held between years 1996 and 2007, was an international get-together for porcelain painters and anyone interested in the art of porcelain. The main organizer was Aira Suomela.

== See also ==
- Finnish national road 58
