= Gneiss Point =

Gneiss Point (77°24′S 163°45′E) is a rocky point 2 nautical miles (4 km) north of Marble Point, on the coast of Victoria Land, Antarctica. It was first mapped by the British Antarctic Expedition, 1910–13 under Robert Falcon Scott and so named because of gneissic granite found here.
