= William Copeland (historian) =

Finnish–American historian (1936–2023)

William R. Copeland
- Born: Veikko Vilhelmi Kopra; 4 June 1936; Kannus, Finland
- Died: 13 December 2023 (aged 87); Helsinki, Finland
- Occupation: Historian

William Randolph Copeland (before 1955 Veikko Vilhelmi Kopra; 4 June 1936 – 13 December 2023) was a Finnish-American historian.

Kopra was born in Kannus, but also spent his childhood in Helsinki. He immigrated from Finland to the United States in 1949 and changed his name to Copeland when he became a U.S. citizen in 1955. Copeland studied at the University of Maryland, Georgetown University, and the University of Helsinki, where he received his doctorate in political history. Copeland served as the head of the Fulbright Program and later taught Russian and Chinese history. Copeland was a docent at the universities of Helsinki and Joensuu.

== Work ==
- The Uneasy Alliance: Collaboration Between the Finnish Opposition and the Russian Underground 1899-1904 (1973). University of Helsinki.
- Symposium on the Arctic Ocean of Northern Europe in International Politics until 2000 (1978). Finnish Pugwash Committee; University of Helsinki.
- Finnish-American academic and professional exchanges: analyses and reminiscences (1983). Foundation for Research in Higher Education and Science Policy.

== See also ==
- Finnish Americans
