= Haapajärvi =

- Town
- Haapajärven kaupunki Haapajärvi stad
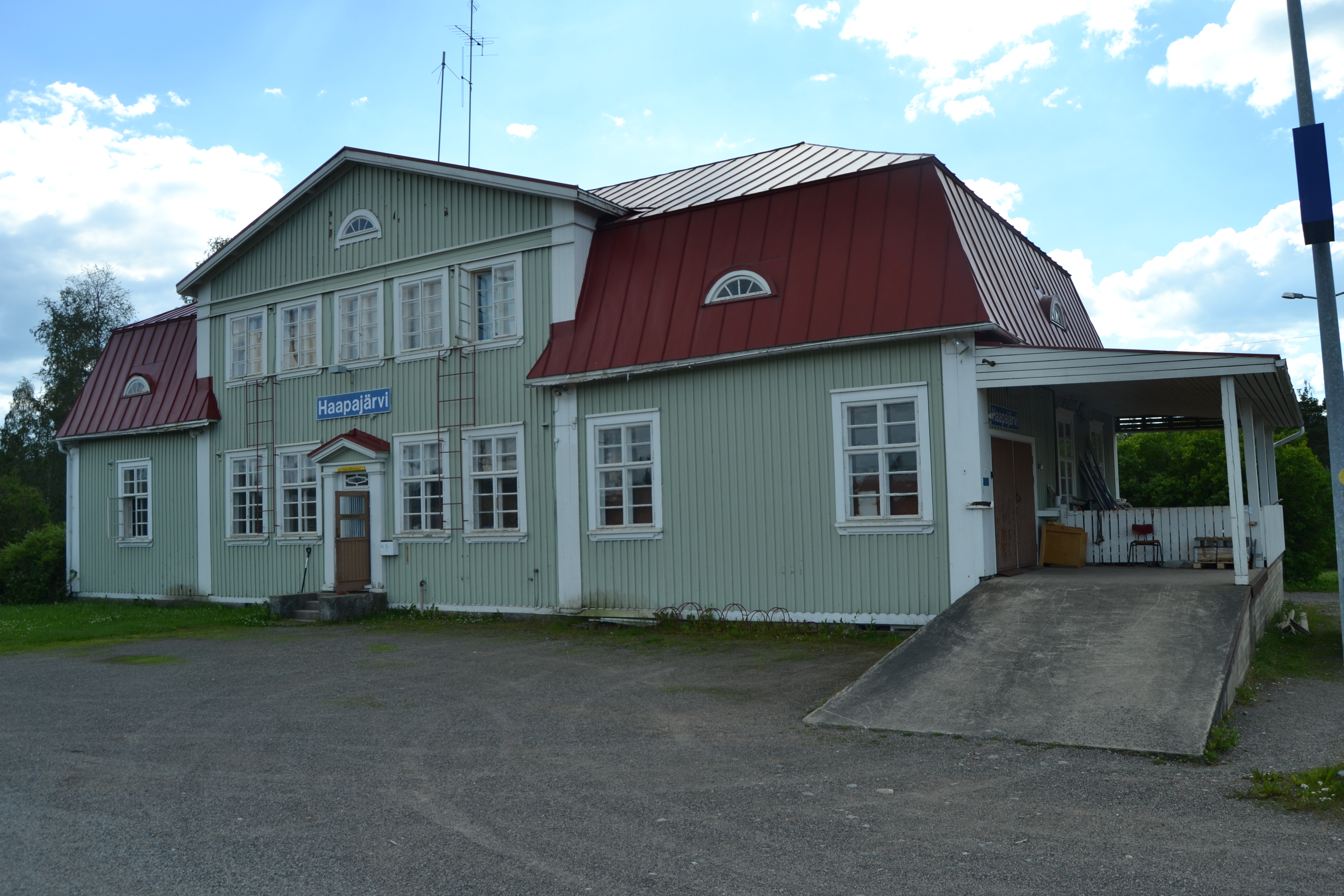
- Haapajärvi railway station

- Coat of arms

- Location of Haapajärvi in Finland
- Interactive map of Haapajärvi
- Coordinates: 63°45′N 025°19′E
- Country: Finland
- Region: North Ostrobothnia
- Sub-region: Nivala–Haapajärvi
- Charter: 1838
- Town privileges: 1977

Government
  - Town manager: Juha Uusivirta

Area (2018-01-01)
  - Total: 789.11 km^{2} (304.68 sq mi)
  - Land: 766.45 km^{2} (295.93 sq mi)
  - Water: 23.44 km^{2} (9.05 sq mi)
  - Rank: 109th largest in Finland

Population (2025-12-31)
  - Total: 6,441
  - Rank: 141st largest in Finland
  - Density: 8.4/km^{2} (22/sq mi)

Population by native language
  - Finnish: 97.9% (official)
  - Others: 2.1%

Population by age
  - 0 to 14: 18.3%
  - 15 to 64: 56.3%
  - 65 or older: 25.4%
- Time zone: UTC+02:00 (EET)
  - Summer (DST): UTC+03:00 (EEST)
- Website: www.haapajarvi.fi

Haapajärvi (Finnish: [ˈhɑːpɑˌjærʋi]) is a town and municipality of Finland.

It is located in the province of Oulu and is part of the Northern Ostrobothnia region. The town has a population of 6,441 (31 December 2025) and covers an area of 789.11 square kilometres (304.68 sq mi) of which 23.44 km^{2} (9.05 sq mi) is water. The population density is 8.4 inhabitants per square kilometre (22/sq mi).

Neighbour municipalities are Haapavesi, Kärsämäki, Nivala, Pihtipudas, Pyhäjärvi, Reisjärvi and Sievi.

The municipality is unilingually Finnish.

== History ==
Haapajärvi was first mentioned in 1548 as Hapaierffue (a Swedish transcription of the Finnish name), when it was a part of the parish of Kalajoki. Many of the initial settlers of the area were Savonians, including the Herranen and Ronka(i)nen families already mentioned in 1543 as settlers in Kalajoki. According to the oldest known (1547) tax documents regarding the area, at least half of Haapajärvi's inhabitants were Savonians. Due to this, the area of Haapajärvi (including Pidisjärvi) was known as Kalajoen Savo in the 16th century. Savonian influence is still present in the Central Ostrobothnian dialect spoken in Haapajärvi.

The men of Jämsä held hunting grounds in the area; opposed to the settlement on their lands, men from Jämsä attacked the Savonian settlements of the Kalajoki and Pyhäjoki valleys in 1551. The settlers soon notified the king of Sweden (Gustav Vasa), who forbade the Tavastians from disturbing the new settlements, however also stating that the Tavastians were allowed to settle on their own hunting grounds as well.

The first church was built in 1649 or 1653. Haapajärvi acquired chapel rights in 1698 and became an independent parish in 1838, also including the chapel communities of Pidisjärvi and Reisjärvi. Both Reisjärvi and Pidisjärvi (Nivala) were separated in 1868.

A chapel was built in the village of Olkkola for the Laestadian community in the 1920s, however it has never been officially designated as a church or a chapel. Olkkola was a chapel community from 1927 to 1978.

Haapajärvi became a town (kaupunki) in 1977.

== Villages ==
- Ahola
- Autioranta
- Haaganperä
- Jokela
- Kalakangas
- Karjalahdenranta
- Kiurunperä
- Koposperä
- Kumiseva
- Kuona
- Kuusaa
- Mustanperä
- Mäntyperä
- Nokkous
- Oksava
- Olkkola
- Parkkila
- Puronperä
- Tiitonranta
- Tuomiperä
- Varisperä
- Vehkapuhto
- Veivarinperä
- Ylipää

== Sport ==
Haapajärven Speedway track (63°45′29″N 25°24′55″E) is a motorcycle speedway venue located approximately 6 kilometres east of the town in a remote forested area, off the Kauniskankaantie road, adjacent to the motocross facility. The speedway track has held the final of the Finnish Individual Speedway Championship on five occasions from 2008 to 2023.

== Notable people ==
- Petri Tapio Mattson (born 1973), Finnish violinist and ensemble director
- Johan Gabriel Ståhlberg (1832–1873), Finnish priest and father of President K. J. Ståhlberg

== Gallery ==
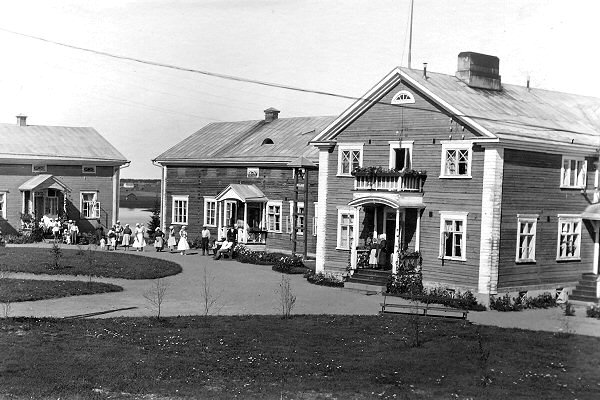
A "municipal home" (kunnaliskoti) for those unable to provide themselves in Haapajärvi in pre-war Finland

== See also ==
- Finnish national road 58
