= Sievi =

- Municipality
- Sievin kunta Sievi kommun
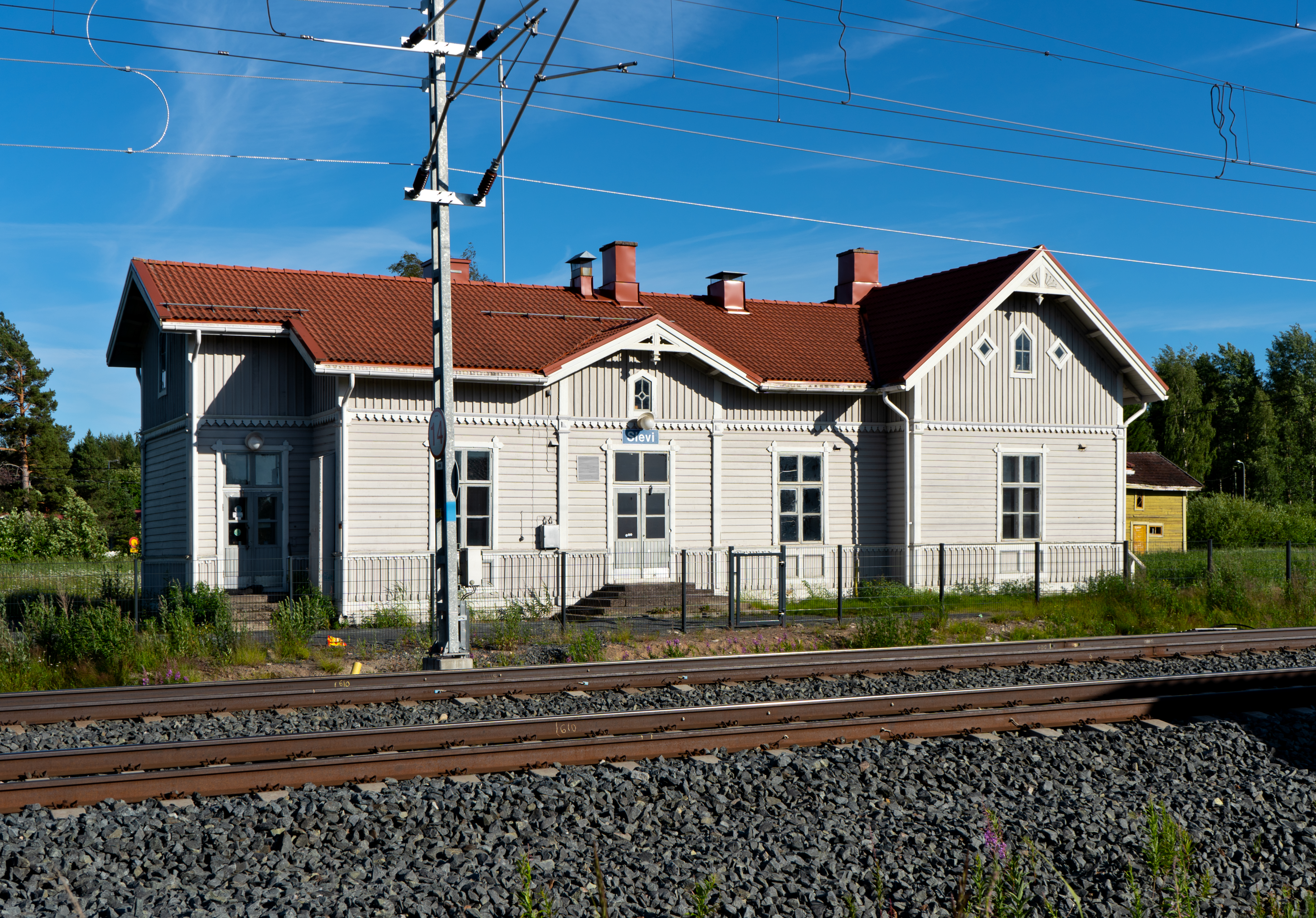
- Sievi railway station

- Coat of arms

- Location of Sievi in Finland
- Interactive map of Sievi
- Coordinates: 63°54′N 024°31′E
- Country: Finland
- Region: North Ostrobothnia
- Sub-region: Ylivieska
- Charter: 1867

Government
  - Municipal manager: Markku Koski

Area (2018-01-01)
  - Total: 800.55 km^{2} (309.09 sq mi)
  - Land: 786.4 km^{2} (303.6 sq mi)
  - Water: 13.55 km^{2} (5.23 sq mi)
  - Rank: 104th largest in Finland

Population (2025-12-31)
  - Total: 4,585
  - Rank: 176th largest in Finland
  - Density: 5.83/km^{2} (15.1/sq mi)

Population by native language
  - Finnish: 94.1% (official)
  - Swedish: 0.2%
  - Others: 5.6%

Population by age
  - 0 to 14: 25.1%
  - 15 to 64: 54.8%
  - 65 or older: 20.1%
- Time zone: UTC+02:00 (EET)
  - Summer (DST): UTC+03:00 (EEST)
- Website: www.sievi.fi

Sievi (Finnish pronunciation: [ˈsie̯ʋi]) is a municipality of Finland.

It is located in the province of Oulu and is part of the North Ostrobothnia region. The municipality has a population of 4,585 (31 December 2025) and covers an area of 800.55 square kilometres (309.09 sq mi) of which 13.55 km^{2} (5.23 sq mi) is water. The population density is 5.83 inhabitants per square kilometre (15.1/sq mi).

The municipality is unilingually Finnish.

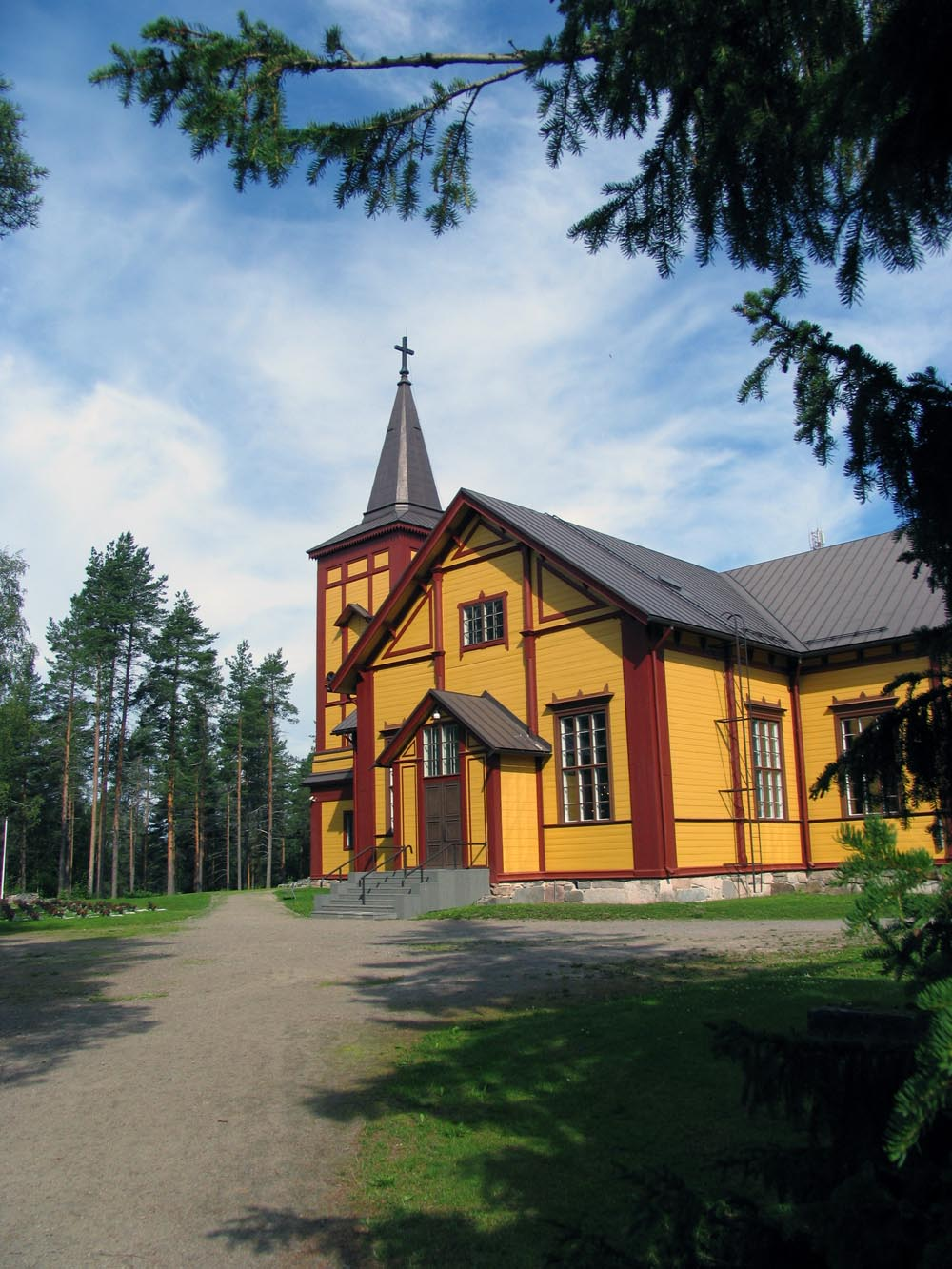
Sievi Church

== History ==
The name of Sievi is derived from the word sievä, which in the local dialect means "smooth". The name was in reference to an esker on which the farm of Sievi(lä) was located. Said farm was first mentioned in 1547 and was owned by Olli Ollinpoika Hihna. Sievi was a part of the Kalajoki parish, under which it became a chapel community in 1645. The chapel community was also known as Evijärvi (not to be confused with the Southern Ostrobothnian Evijärvi) after another village in the area, which is nowadays known as Järvikylä. After becoming an independent parish and municipality in 1862, Sievi became the only official name for it.
