= Pyhäjokilaakso =

Drainage basin in Finland

Pyhäjokilaakso is the basin of the Pyhäjoki river, located in Northern Ostrobothnia, Finland. The town of Pyhäjoki is situated at the mouth of the river, where it empties into the Gulf of Bothnia of the Baltic Sea.

Municipalities in Pyhäjokilaakso are Pyhäjärvi, Haapavesi, Kärsämäki, Merijärvi and Oulainen in addition to Pyhäjoki.

The river name Pyhäjoki literally means "Sacred River". In Finland, a number of placenames begin with the element Pyhä- (sacred), including Pyhäjärvi (Sacred Lake) as well as Pyhäjoki. The background of these names probably is ancient pagan beliefs.
