= Pyhäjoki (river) =

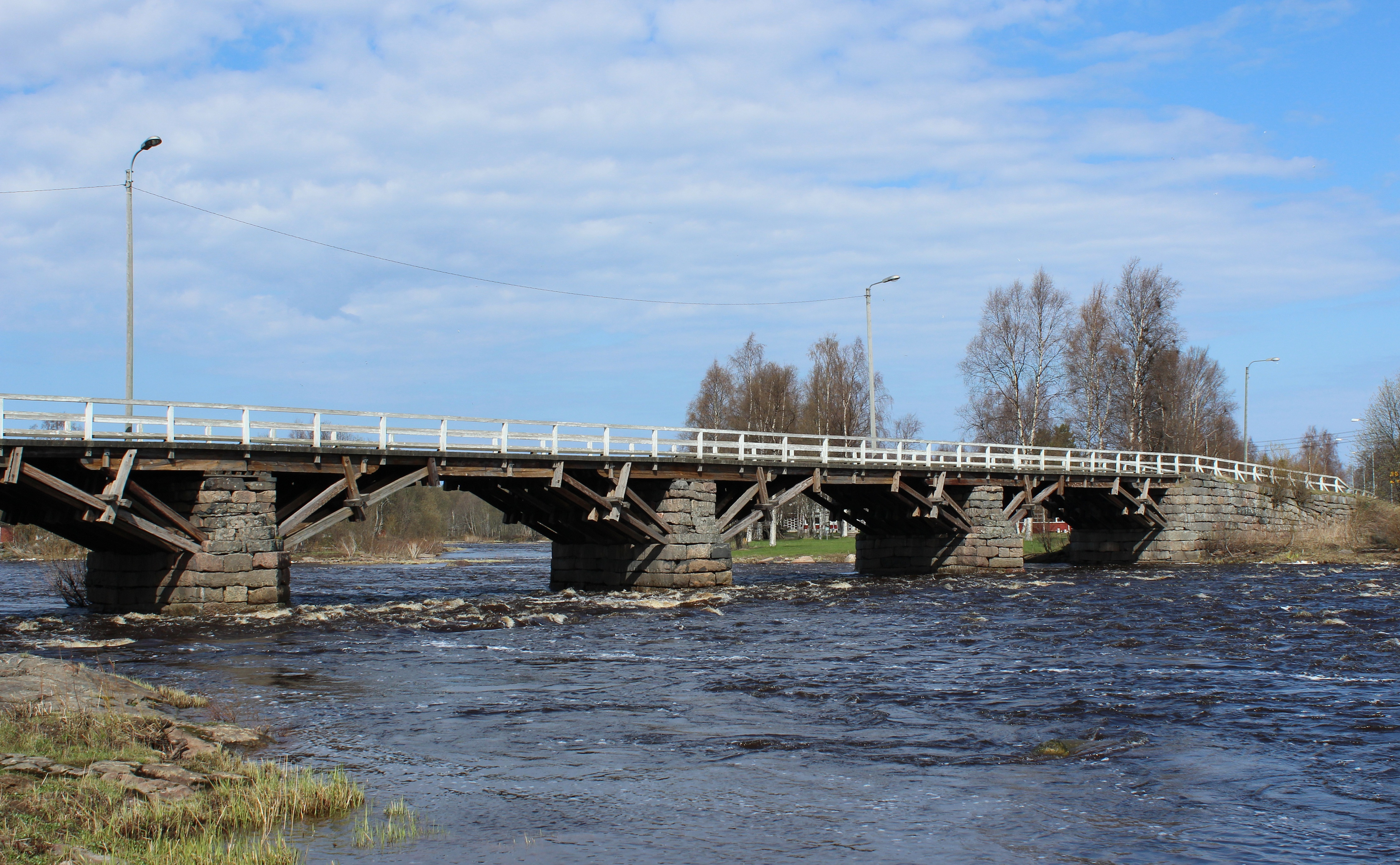
- Etelänkylän isosilta bridge over the Pyhäjoki at Pyhäjoki

Location
- Country: Finland

Physical characteristics
- Source
  - location: Lake Pyhäjärvi
  - coordinates: 63°43′37.2″N 25°58′12″E
- Mouth
  - location: Gulf of Bothnia
  - coordinates: 64°29′2.4″N 24°12′54″E
- Length: 166 km (103 mi)
- Basin size: 3,711.9 km^{2} (1,433.2 sq mi)
- Discharge
  - average: 30 m^{3}/s (1,100 cu ft/s)

The Pyhäjoki (literally: "sacred river") is a river in Northern Ostrobothnia, Finland. It is 166 kilometres (103 mi) long and the town of Pyhäjoki is located where it empties into the Gulf of Bothnia on the Baltic Sea.

The river originates in Lake Pyhäjärvi and flows generally north-northwest through the Pyhäjokilaakso basin, a lightly settled region in southwest Northern Ostrobothnia. Towns along its course are Kärsämäki, Haapavesi and Oulainen. It empties into the Gulf of Bothnia at the town of Pyhäjoki, dividing into two branches shortly beforehand. The drainage basin of the Pyhajöki is variously described as 3,711.9 square kilometres (1,433.2 sq mi) and 3,750 square kilometres (1,450 sq mi); its mean discharge is approximately 30 cubic metres per second (1,100 cu ft/s).

The river has rapids and is used for rafting. Timber was formerly rafted down it, but like the other short rivers in the region, it could not support a major sawmill industry at its mouth. In 1979 the river still had a salmon run, but numbers declined and in 1993 the river was included in a salmon action plan (SAP) under which fry were introduced from the Torne.

The element pyhä-, meaning "sacred", in the name of the river and of the lake where it originates, stems from Finnish paganism.
