= Alavieska =

- Municipality
- Alavieskan kunta Alavieska kommun
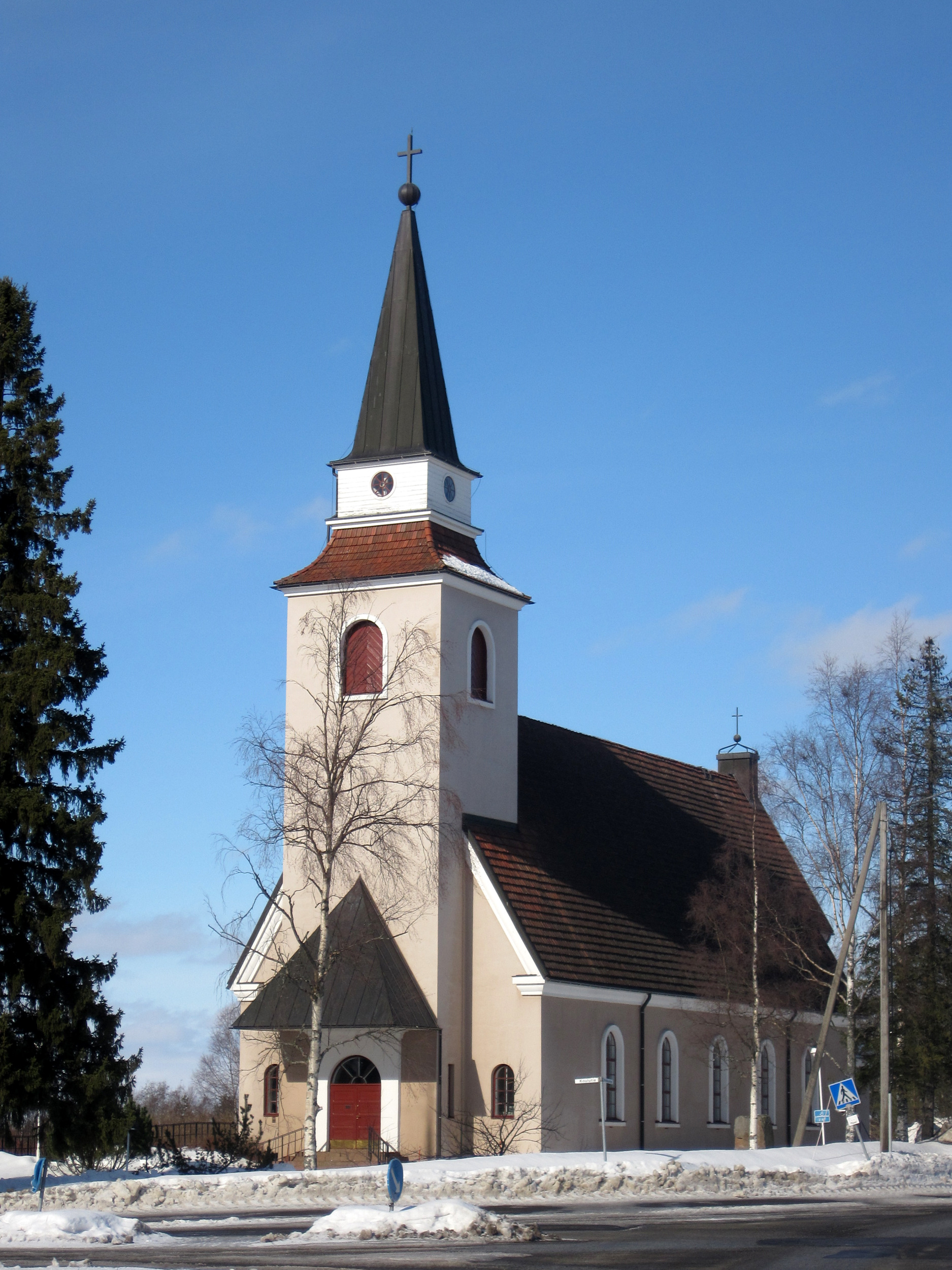
- Alavieska Church

- Coat of arms

- Location of Alavieska in Finland
- Interactive map of Alavieska
- Coordinates: 64°10′N 024°18.5′E
- Country: Finland
- Region: North Ostrobothnia
- Sub-region: Ylivieska
- Charter: 1879

Government
  - Mayor: Kari Pentti

Area (2018-01-01)
  - Total: 253.02 km^{2} (97.69 sq mi)
  - Land: 251.5 km^{2} (97.1 sq mi)
  - Water: 1.66 km^{2} (0.64 sq mi)
  - Rank: 245th largest in Finland

Population (2025-12-31)
  - Total: 2,384
  - Rank: 238th largest in Finland
  - Density: 9.48/km^{2} (24.6/sq mi)

Population by native language
  - Finnish: 97.9% (official)
  - Others: 2.1%

Population by age
  - 0 to 14: 19.3%
  - 15 to 64: 55.8%
  - 65 or older: 24.9%
- Time zone: UTC+02:00 (EET)
  - Summer (DST): UTC+03:00 (EEST)
- Website: www.alavieska.fi

Alavieska (Finnish pronunciation: [ˈɑlɑˌʋie̯skɑ]) is a municipality of Finland. It is located in the province of Oulu and is part of the Northern Ostrobothnia region. The municipality has a population of 2,384 (31 December 2025) and covers an area of 253.02 square kilometres (97.69 sq mi) of which 1.66 km^{2} (0.64 sq mi) is water. The population density is 9.48 inhabitants per square kilometre (24.6/sq mi).

The municipality is unilingually Finnish. The word Ala means "lower", while the word Vieska is supposed to mean a "shallow ford".

The scythe theme of Alavieska's coat of arms refers to the extensive meadows in the municipality's territory. The coat of arms was designed by Kaj Kajander, and the Alavieska municipal council approved it at its meeting on September 20, 1960. The Ministry of the Interior approved the coat of arms for use on November 25 of the same year.

== Geography ==
Neighbouring municipalities are Kalajoki, Merijärvi, Oulainen and Ylivieska.

=== Villages ===
In 1967, Alavieska had six legally recognized villages (henkikirjakylät):

- Alavieska
- Eteläranta
- Kähtävä
- Somero
- Taluskylä
- Käännänkylä

== Demographics ==
=== Population ===
On the 31 December 2025, the municipality has a population of 2,384 (238th largest in Finland). The population density was 9.48/km^{2}. In 2020, the age structure of a population was: children (under 15 years old) — 19.3%; the working-age residents (15–64 years) — 55.8%; the elderly (65 years and older) — 24.9%. The average age was 43.8, above the national average of 43.4 and regional average of 40.8.

Population size of in 1980–2020
Year	Residents
1975	3,056
1980	2,990(−0.44%)
1985	3,040(+0.33%)
1990	3,072(+0.21%)
1995	3,051(−0.14%)
2000	2,940(−0.74%)
2005	2,854(−0.59%)
2010	2,770(−0.60%)
2015	2,687(−0.61%)
2020	2,514(−1.30%)
The data refers to the conditions on 31 December of the current year according to the territorial division on 1 January 2022.

=== Languages ===
The population by language (mother tongue) on 31 December 2022. Finnish (suomi), Swedish (ruotsi) and Sami (saame) count as indigenous languages as they have official status in the country. The rest of the languages are counted as foreign. For languages with fewer than 10 speakers, the figure is hidden by Tilastokeskus due to confidentiality reasons. Speakers of Finnish made up 99.0% of the population and speakers of Swedish made up 0.2%, while the share of speakers of foreign languages was 0.8%. Foreign nationals made up 0.6% of the total population.

Language	Speakers in 2022	
Language	Quantity	Part (%)
Total population	2,447	100.0
Official languages	2,425	99.1
Finnish	2,421	98.9
Swedish	4	0.2
Foreign languages	22	0.9
Other	22	0.9

Population by native language
1. Finnish (98.9%)
2. Swedish (0.20%)
3. other (0.90%)

=== Urban areas ===
In 2019, out of the total population of 2,519, 1,281 people lived in the sole urban area, the Alavieska parish village, while lived 1,220 in sparsely populated areas and the coordinates of 18 people were unknown. This made Alavieska's degree of urbanization 51.2%.

== Economy ==
In 2018, 23.1% of the workforce of Alavieska worked in primary production (agriculture, forestry and fishing), 22.4% in secondary production (e.g. manufacturing, construction and infrastructure), and 52.9% in services. In 2019, the unemployment rate was 8.8%, and the share of pensioners in the population was 29.5%.

== Notable people ==
- Pentti Kahma, discus thrower
- Teemu Kattilakoski, skier
- Rauli Pudas, pole vaulter

== See also ==
- Ylivieska
