= UFOs of Pudasjärvi =

Finnish UFO sightings between 1960s and 1970s

Pudasjärvi sightings
- Date: 13 November 1967 – 29 January 1971
- Location: Syötekylä, Pudasjärvi, North Ostrobothnia; 65°38′32″N 27°42′55″E

The UFOs of Pudasjärvi (Pudasjärven ufot) were light phenomena and flying objects that many witnesses reported seeing in and around the area of Pudasjärvi in North Ostrobothnia, Finland, in the late 1960s and early 1970s. The highest number of sightings was reported in January 1971, and the largest regional concentration of sightings was in Särkivaara (now Syötekylä), located about 145 kilometres (90 mi) northeast of Oulu and about 165 kilometres (103 mi) southeast of Rovaniemi in the vicinity of Iso-Syöte near the Taivalkoski's municipal border. In terms of timing, it also correlated to the Saapunki's "light ball" seen in Kuusamo in January 1971.

Interest by UFO researchers and the press in the UFOs of Pudasjärvi was aroused by a sighting in September 1969. After that, UFO researchers from other parts of Finland and Sweden visited the region. Scientists also took a prominent part in the public debate sparked by the UFO sightings in Pudasjärvi, commenting sceptically on the alleged observations and evidence; some parties even tried to find uranium in Pudasjärvi, inspired by the sightings. An earthquake light has been proposed as an explanation for the Pudasjärvi phenomena. Based on seismic magnitude measurements made in Finland, there are more earthquakes than usual in Northwestern Kainuu and Southeastern Lapland, most of which can only be detected with a seismometer. The Pudasjärvi region is home to an ancient fault line and the boundary between different rock types.

In the 1970s, engineer Ahti Karivieri (1933–2022) and taxi driver Atte Särkelä (1936–2021) planned and implemented a small-scale photography project to capture the phenomena on film. The result was approximately 400 shots of color slides, black-and-white photos, and infrared images. The best and most research-valuable images were obtained on infrared film.

== See also ==
- Finnish Air Force UFO sighting
