= Yppäri =

Village in North Ostrobothnia, Finland

- Village
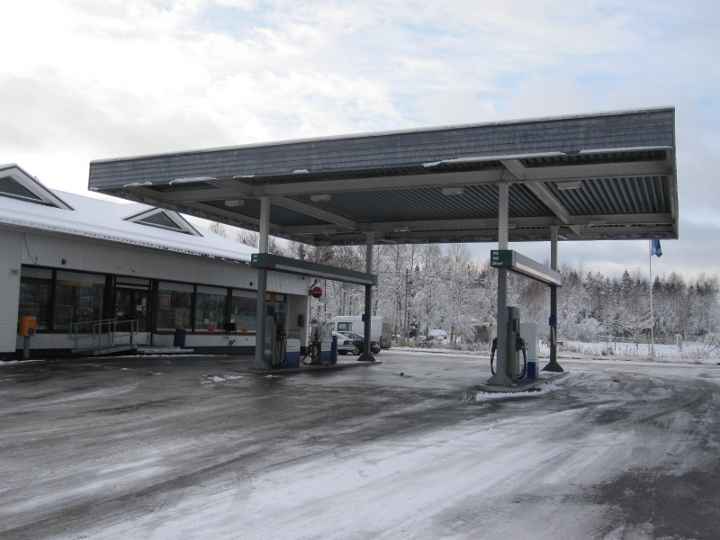
- Yppäri filling station along the highway

- Location in Finland
- Coordinates: 64°24.20′N 24°06.00′E
- Country: Finland
- Region: North Ostrobothnia
- Municipality: Pyhäjoki

Area
  - Total: 3.28 km^{2} (1.27 sq mi)

Population (31 December 2023)
  - Total: 311
  - Density: 94.8/km^{2} (246/sq mi)
- Time zone: UTC+2 (EET)
  - Summer (DST): UTC+3 (EEST)
- Postal code: 86170

Yppäri (Finnish pronunciation: [ˈypːæri]; previously in the form Ypperi) is a village in the western part of Pyhäjoki, the municipality of North Ostrobothnia, Finland. It is located along the Highway 8 (E8), about 9 kilometres (5.6 mi) southwest of the town centre towards Kalajoki. At the end of 2023, the village had over 300 residents.

The village has one primary school (1-6 grade) and Neste's filling station, which also houses the village's local grocery store.

The village's attractions include the Liekki (lit. 'flame'), a memorial monument of the Great Wrath, sculpted by Oskari Jauhiainen (1913–1990).

== See also ==
- Battle of Pyhäjoki – the Finnish War battle fought near the villages of Yppäri and Viirte in Pyhäjoki
