= Battle of Pyhäjoki =

1808 battle of the Finnish War

Coordinates: 64°27′50″N 24°15′30″E

- Part of the Finnish War
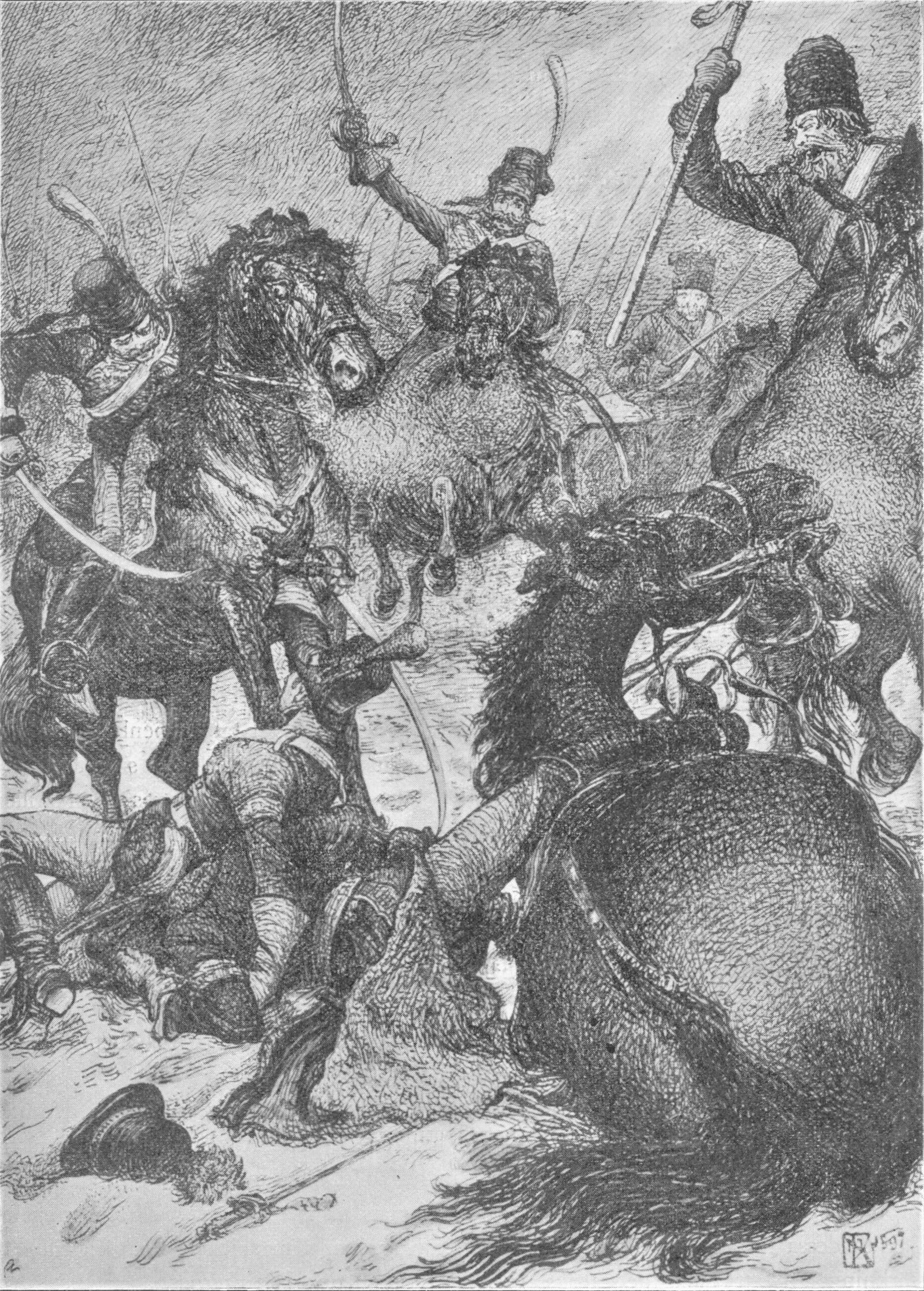
- Öfverste Löwenhjelms tillfångatagande, by Nils Kreuger
Date	16 April 1808
Location	Pyhäjoki, north of Ostrobothnia, Finland
Result	Russian victory

Belligerents
Sweden	Russian Empire

Commanders and leaders
Wilhelm Mauritz Klingspor	(Russian Empire) Yakov Petrovich Kulnev

Strength
2,000–2,500	1,300

Casualties and losses
183 killed, wounded or captured	100–150 killed, wounded or captured

The Battle of Pyhäjoki was a retreating action fought on 16 April 1808, at Pyhäjoki in Northern Ostrobothnia during the Russian–Swedish war of 1808–09. The winter made the operations more difficult and the battle of Pyhäjoki became one of the first skirmishes to be fought after the Swedish retreat stopped. The Russian army had been following the Swedish army to the north. At the same time, they had left large portions of Finland to be occupied by the Russians. Yakov Petrovich Kulnev led a vanguard of 1,300 men — his army counted 4,000 men in total — and caught up with the rearguard of the retreating Swedish main army at the village of Ypperi. Skirmishes occurred all the way to Pyhäjoki, where the Swedes made a brief stand, before Wilhelm Mauritz Klingspor gave orders to von Döbeln and Gripenberg to continue the retreat to follow the original strategic plan. The Swedes had checked Kulnev's attack with about 2,000–2,500 men (out of around 7,000), however, as the Swedes fought a retreating battle, only one battalion at the time could go up against the Russians for most of the fighting. They had lost 183 men in killed, wounded and captured (among the latter, adjutant general Gustaf Löwenhielm). Kulnev had lost 71 men at Pyhäjoki alone but probably around double that number when applying the losses from the fighting at Ypperi towards Pyhäjoki.

== Swedish regiments and losses ==
- Tavastehus Infantry Regiment (3 battalions); 63 killed or captured, 35 wounded
- Nyland Infantry Regiment (1 battalion); 2 killed
- Åbo Infantry Regiment (2 battalions); 1 killed
- Nyland Jägers (1 company)
- Finnish Artillery Regiment
- Nyland Dragoon Regiment (3 squadrons); 14 wounded and 9 captured and wounded

== Citations and sources ==
=== Sources ===
- Hornborg, Eirik (1955). När riket sprängdes: fälttågen i Finland och Västerbotten, 1808-1809 (in Swedish). Stockholm: P. A. Norstedts och Söners Förlag.
