= Kallankari Islands =

Finnish islands

Coordinates: 64°18′55″N 023°30′35″E

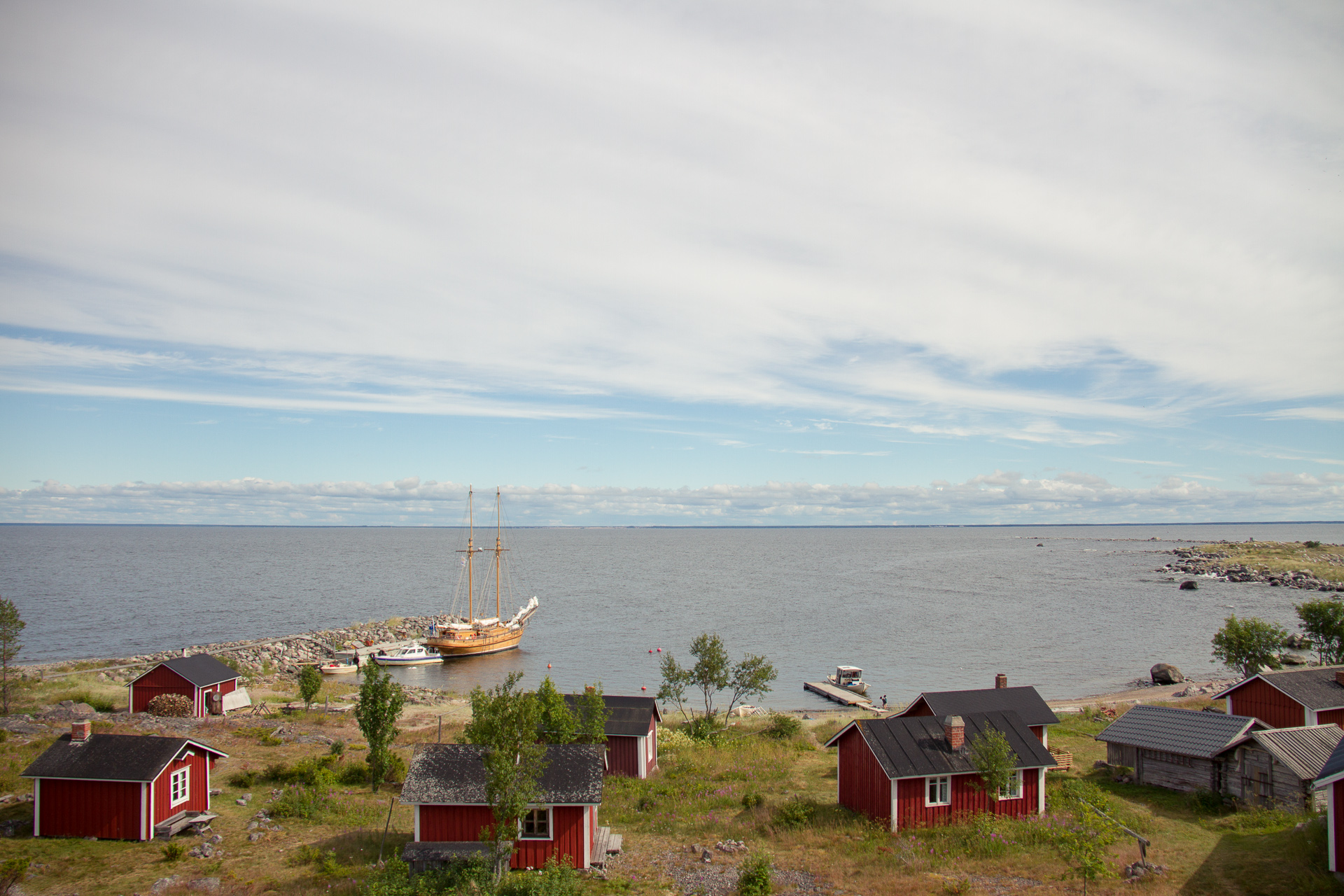
View to southeast from the Maakalla Lighthouse. The Ansio Galeas in the harbour.

The Kallankari Islands (Finnish: Kallankarit) are two islands, Maakalla and Ulkokalla, located on the Bothnian Bay in North Ostrobothnia, Finland. It is officially part of the town of Kalajoki and is located 16 kilometres (9.9 mi) from the mainland.

Approximately 4,000—5,000 tourists visit Maakalla and its fishing village every year. On clear days the Church of Maakalla can be seen from the coast of mainland Finland.

== Self-government ==
In addition to their nature, the specialty of the Kallankari is the self-government of the islands, whose "supreme decision-making and judicial power" is exercised by the Assembly. Self-government dates back to the time of Swedish rule and is based on the Hamina Order, enacted by King Adolf Frederick in 1771, which entrusts the reins to the fishermen. The meeting will be held annually on Sunday closest to 25th of July. The National Land Survey has stated that the islands are owned by the state of Finland, but under a royal decree, the management of Maakalla has been transferred to the local fishermen. Legally, however, the Kallankari Islands does not belong to Finnish self-governing communities or organizations, unlike Åland.

== Sights ==
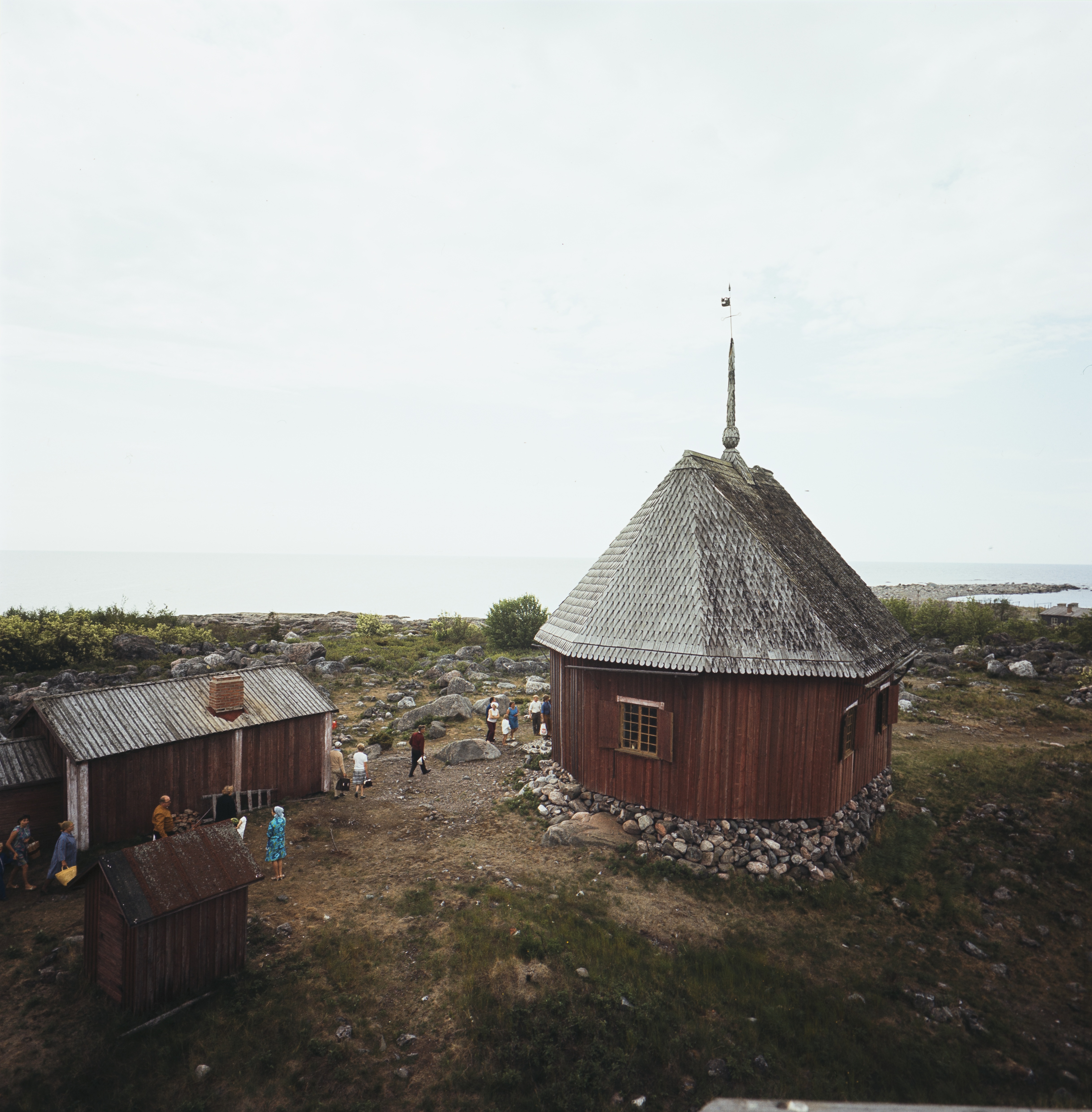
Maakalla Church

- Maakalla Church, an octagonal wooden church built by Simon Silvén from Kalajoki, and a small rectory, both from the 1780s
- Fishing Museum
- Lighthouse island of Ulkokalla

== Climate ==
Climate data for Kalajoki Ulkokalla (1992–2023 normals, extremes 1959–1976 and 1995– present)
Month	Jan	Feb	Mar	Apr	May	Jun	Jul	Aug	Sep	Oct	Nov	Dec	Year
Record high °C (°F)	6.2 (43.2)	4.9 (40.8)	6.5 (43.7)	14.6 (58.3)	22.1 (71.8)	27.0 (80.6)	28.1 (82.6)	27.7 (81.9)	22.0 (71.6)	14.5 (58.1)	10.8 (51.4)	7.2 (45.0)	28.1 (82.6)
Daily mean °C (°F)	−4.1 (24.6)	−5.5 (22.1)	−3.3 (26.1)	0.3 (32.5)	4.2 (39.6)	10.3 (50.5)	15.4 (59.7)	15.1 (59.2)	11.2 (52.2)	6.1 (43.0)	1.8 (35.2)	−1.2 (29.8)	4.2 (39.6)
Record low °C (°F)	−28.4 (−19.1)	−36.2 (−33.2)	−33.2 (−27.8)	−16.5 (2.3)	−7.7 (18.1)	1.1 (34.0)	6.9 (44.4)	5.1 (41.2)	1.8 (35.2)	−5.5 (22.1)	−14.2 (6.4)	−23.8 (−10.8)	−36.2 (−33.2)
Source 1: FMI
Source 2: Record highs and lows

== See also ==
- Kalajoki Beach
