= Iso-Syöte =

Fell in Pudasjärvi, Finland

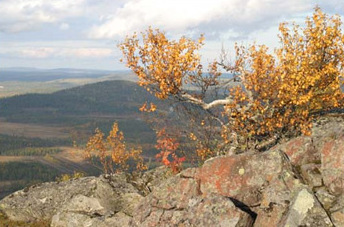

Highest point
- Elevation: 432 m (1,417 ft)
- Coordinates: 65°37′32″N 027°36′16″E

Geography
- Location within Finland
- Location: Pudasjärvi, Northern Ostrobothnia, Finland

Iso-Syöte is the southernmost fell in Finland, adjacent to the Syöte National Park that is named after the fell. Located approximately 150 kilometres (90 mi) from the Arctic Circle, Syöte is Finland's southernmost fell region, and it also happens to be the Finnish region that gets the most snow. The blanket of snow covering the trees and landscape transforms nature into a fairy tale land. Travelling resort consists of two fells and skiing centers, namely Iso-Syöte and Pikku-Syöte.
