= Kouva =

Village in Pudasjärvi, Finland

Coordinates: 65°50′N 027°42′E

Kouva is a village in Pudasjärvi, Finland. Year 2004, Kouva had 47 inhabitants. A smaller village, with the name Jäkälavaara is located just 1 kilometre (0.6 mi) from Kouva. Kouva is also close to the Syöte National Park. Kouva is located close to a small lake.
