= Uljua Reservoir =

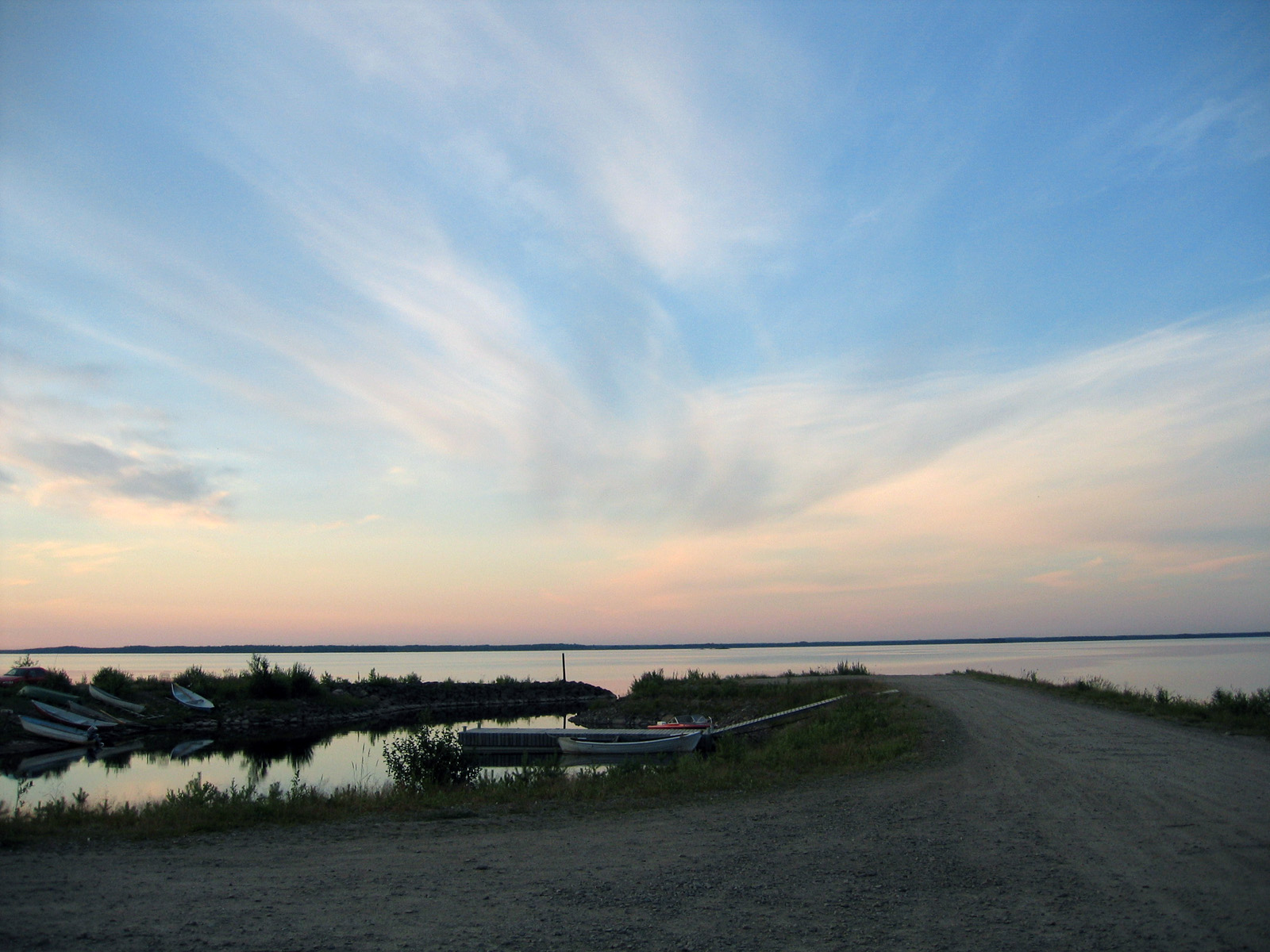
- Sunset at Uljua Reservoir

- Location within Finland
- Location: Siikalatva
- Coordinates: 64.3149°N 25.937°E
- Type: Reservoir
- Basin countries: Finland
- Surface area: 27.496 km^{2} (10.616 sq mi)
- Shore length^{1}: 56.69 km (35.23 mi)
- Surface elevation: 78.5 m (258 ft)
- Frozen: December–April
- Settlements: Pulkkila
- ^{1} Shore length is not a well-defined measure.

Uljua Reservoir is a medium-sized lake in the Siikajoki main catchment area. It is located in the region Northern Ostrobothnia. The reservoir is located at the village of Pulkkila, in Siikalatva municipality.

== See also ==
- List of lakes in Finland
