= Himanka =

- Former municipality
- Himangan kunta Himango kommun
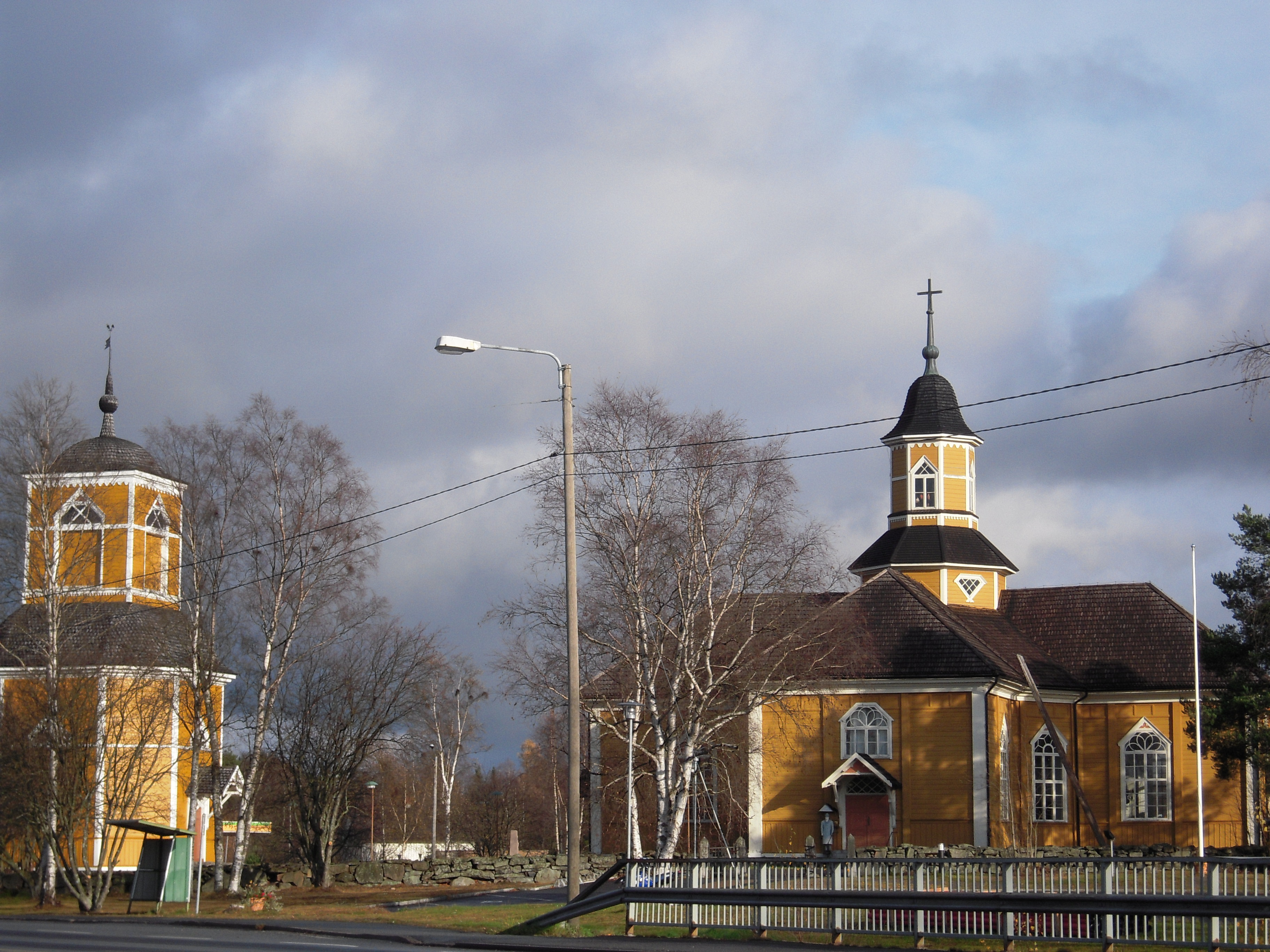
- The Apostolic Lutheran Church of Himanka

- Coat of arms

- Location of Himanka in Finland
- Coordinates: 64°03.5′N 023°39′E
- Country: Finland
- Region: Northern Ostrobothnia
- Sub-region: Ylivieska sub-region
- Charter: 1868
- Consolidated: 2010

Government
  - Municipal manager: Erkki Hirsimäki

Area
  - Total: 649.84 km^{2} (250.90 sq mi)
  - Land: 254.63 km^{2} (98.31 sq mi)
  - Water: 395.21 km^{2} (152.59 sq mi)

Population (2009-12-31)
  - Total: 3,023
  - Density: 11.87/km^{2} (30.75/sq mi)
- Time zone: UTC+2 (EET)
  - Summer (DST): UTC+3 (EEST)
- Website: www.himanka.fi

Himanka (Swedish: Himango) is a former municipality of Finland. Himanka was consolidated with the neighboring town of Kalajoki on January 1, 2010.

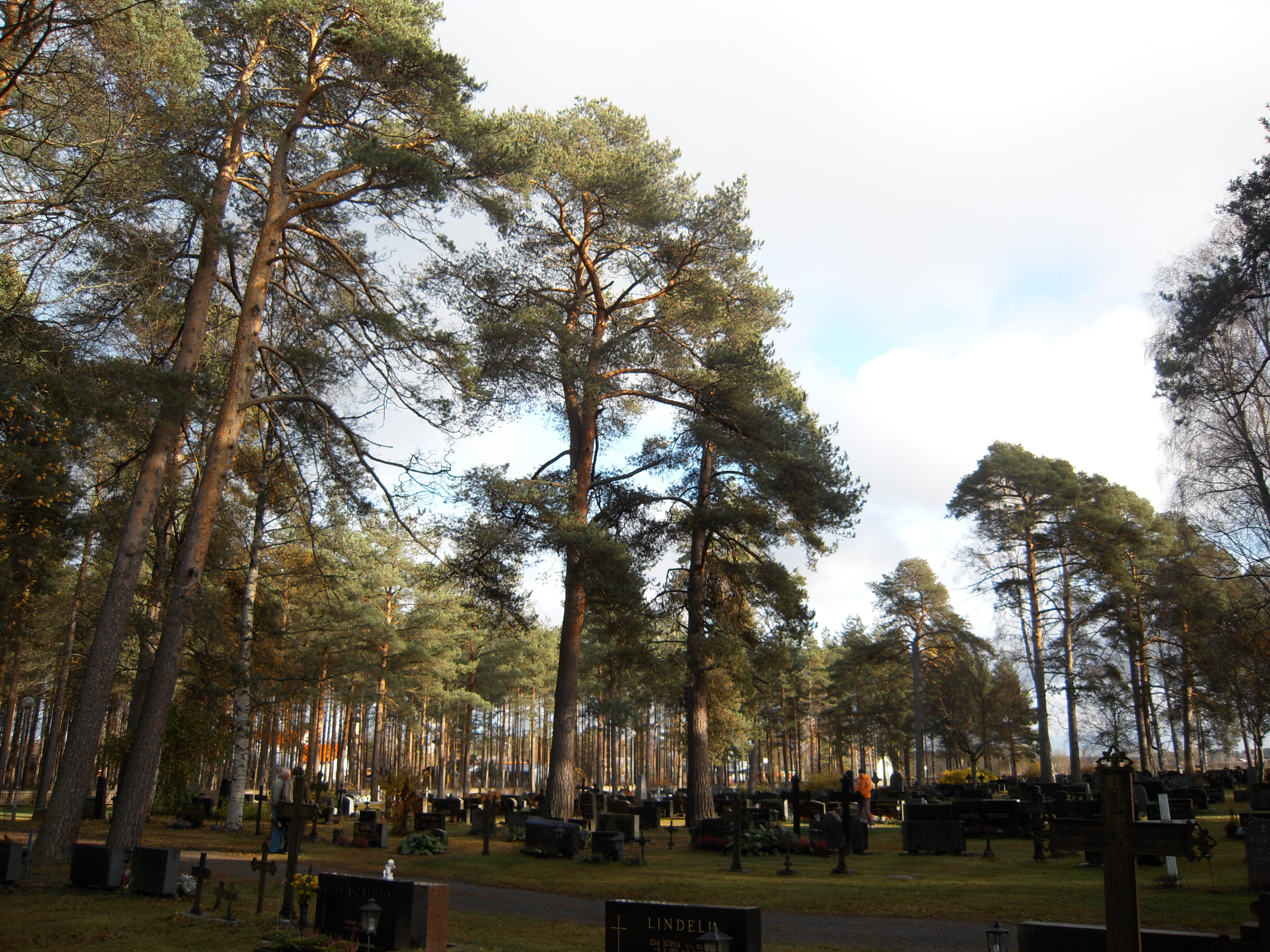
The main cemetery of Himanka

It is located in the Central Ostrobothnia region. The municipality had a population of 3,123 (31 December 2009) and covered an area of 649.84 square kilometres (250.90 sq mi) of which 395.21 km^{2} (152.59 sq mi) is water. The population density was 11.87 inhabitants per square kilometre (30.7/sq mi).

The municipality is unilingually Finnish. The villages of Ainali, Himankakylä, Pahkala, Pernu, Pöntiö, Rautila, Saarenpää, Tomujoki, Torvenkylä, and Hillilä all belonged to the municipality.

The main products of the area include farm products and fox and mink furs. There is also some wood and plastics product design and manufacturing.

The oldest part of the central Himanka is called Raumankari. At the heart of Himanka is the river Lestijoki which empties into the Gulf of Bothnia.
