= Haanpää =

Haanpää is a Finnish surname. Notable people with the surname include:

- Ari Haanpää (born 1965), Finnish hockey player
- Pentti Haanpää (1905–1955), Finnish author
- Samuel Haanpää (born 1986), Finnish basketball player
