= Battle of Olhava =

Armed conflict

- Part of the Lapland War of World War II
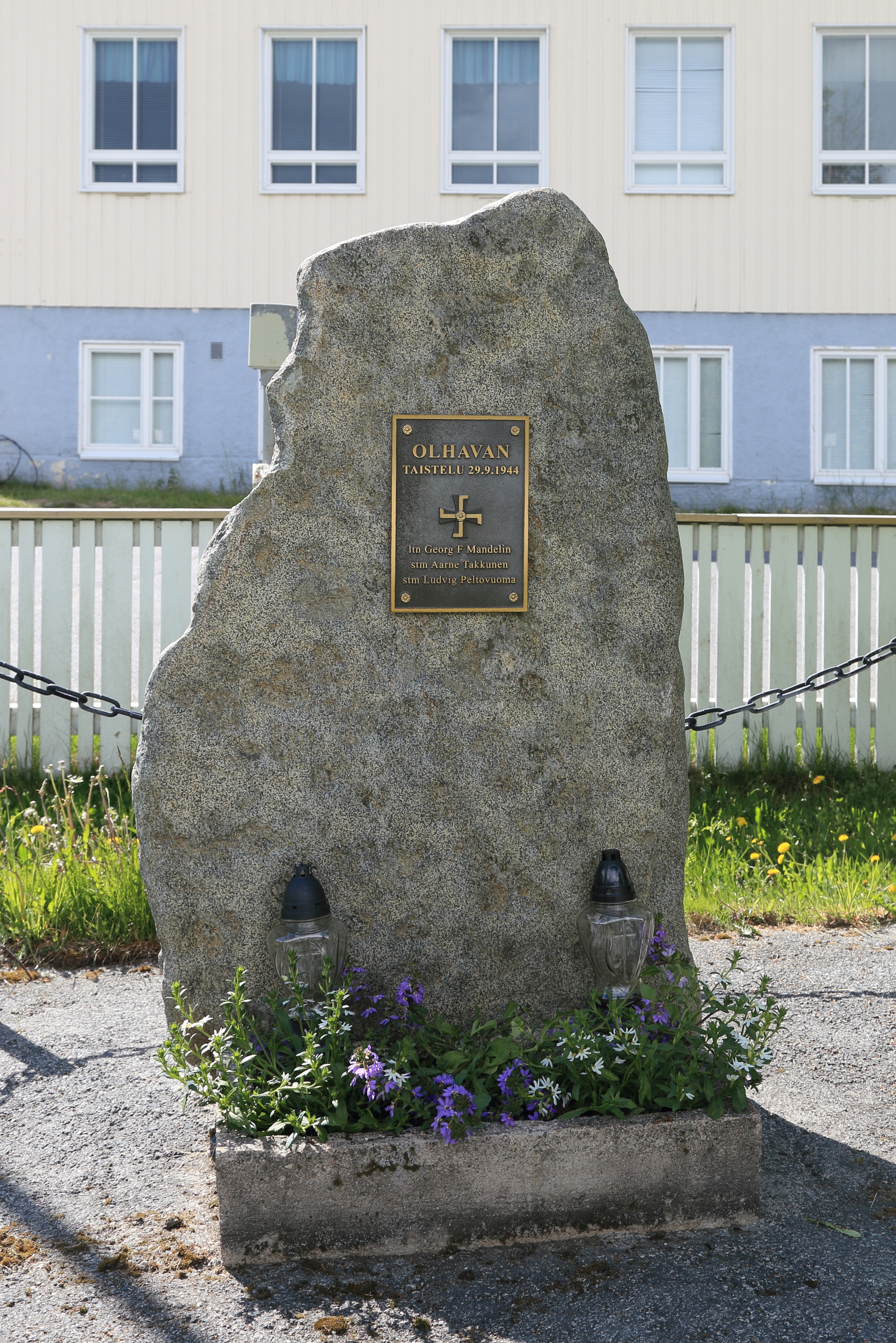
- Memorial stone for the battle
Date	28 September 1944
Location	Olhava, Ii, Finland 65°16′N 25°25′E
Result	German victory

Belligerents
Germany	Finland

Commanders and leaders
Obersturmführer Zimmermann	August Kuisto

Strength
SS-Intelligence Battalion 6	15th Brigade

Casualties and losses
2 killed	5 killed

The Battle of Olhava occurred during the Lapland War on 28 September 1944. A brief armed struggle occurred in Northern Finland between retreating German troops and north of the advancement of the Finnish troops. The previous day the first skirmish between German and Finnish troops in Pudasjärvi. In Olhava, troops for the first time opened full-scale fire against each other and the casualties were the first of the Lapland War.

== Background ==
Finland cut off relations with Germany on 2 September 1944. Afterwards the Soviet Union signed a peace treaty with Finland and the conditions precedent demanding from the Finns the removal of all German troops by 15 September at the latest. In Northern Finland, the 200,000-strong German 20th Mountain Army Corps left plans prepared in advance, the Birken operation to withdraw from the north to the new defensive positions as early as September. New stations were fortified ready along Karesuvanto-Ivalo against the attack on linjalle from southern Finland. East stations trusted in Pechenga nickel production for the Germans, and, on the other hand, were protected by the arm and the Norwegian side vetäytymistietä to the south.

German retreat had taken place without battles in harmony with the Finns in Syysmanööverit by to mid-September. The Control Commission had, however, got wind of the matter and put pressure on the Finnish sharper activities. On 27 September the commander of the Finnish troops launched major general Hjalmar Siilasvuo.

On the previous evening, the Jaeger Battalion 5th had been given a command by Siilasvuo to go directly to Pudasjärvi, where the troops were exchanging shots with Germans. Prior to this, the Finns had proceeded in accordance with the agreed schedule followed by the Germans. Olhavalla troops were given the task to take over the intact Olhavajoki in excess of 45 meters long railway and road bridge.

== Battle ==
Finnish troops progressed from Oulu to Kemi, leading the way was Colonel August Kuistio's 15th Brigade, which consisted primarily of separate battalions and detachments from Savukoski. At the head of the Department was led by Major Hautala Hautala. The Finns were on the south side of the bridge, while the Germans had fortified their positions on the north side. The Finnish plan was to flank and cross the river further away from the bridge, followed by a second smaller group would take the bridge over with a high-speed direct assault.

Germans consisted of the SS-Aufklärungs-Bataillon 6, SS-Intelligence Battalion 6, commanded by SS Obersturmführer Zimmermann. Fire- power and fast moving troops consisted of two motorized Jaeger battalions, which were supported by assault guns, anti-aircraft, and tanks. The Germans were aware of the possible intentions of a Finnish attack. The Finnish attack was planned to start in the morning of 29 September. During the clustering of Finnish forces, the Germans discovered and began a rapid withdrawal of their posts. Since it was obvious that the Germans leaving would destroy the bridge, the Finns tried to cut off the ignition of explosives on the bridge. In this case, the Germans blew up the bridge and in the ensuing exchange of gunfire, both sides fired at each other. After the bridge exploded, a total of 5 Finns and 2 Germans were killed. The killed were victims of the first of the Lapland War. Shots Exchange ended in less than half an hour after the Germans retreated towards the north.
