= Pentti Haanpää =

Finnish author

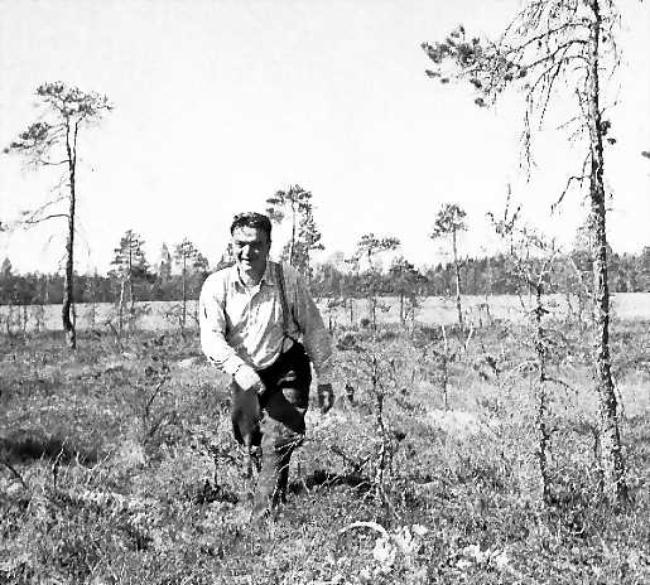
Pentti Haanpää (1950)

Pentti Haanpää (October 14, 1905 – September 30, 1955) was a Finnish author. He was born in Pulkkila, and is best known for his books Vääpeli Sadon tapaus 1935 and Noitaympyrä 1931. He drowned on a fishing trip on Iso Lamujärvi in Pyhäntä, aged 49.

== Bibliography ==
- Maantietä pitkin 1925, Swedish version: Hemfolk och strykare
- Tuuli käy heidän ylitseen 1927
- Kenttä ja kasarmi 1928
- Noitaympyrä 1931/1956
- Vääpeli Sadon tapaus 1935/1956
- Isännät ja isäntien varjot 1935
- Taivalvaaran näyttelijä 1938
- Ihmiselon karvas ihanuus 1939
- Korpisotaa 1940, French version: Guerre dans le Désert Blanc
- Nykyaikaa 1942
- Yhdeksän miehen saappaat 1945
- Jutut 1946/1952
- Jauhot 1949
- Kiinalaiset jutut 1954
