= Aukusti Hiltula =

Finnish politician

Antti Aukusti Hiltula (23 January 1854 – 21 April 1928) was a Finnish farmer and politician. He was born in Pudasjärvi, and was a Member of the Parliament of Finland from 1907 to 1909, representing the Finnish Party.
