= Miiluranta =

Village in Finland

Coordinates: 63°58′N 25°59′E

Miiluranta is a village in Finland, the municipality of Kärsämäki, Northern Ostrobothnia. It is the youngest village of Kärsämäki. The village was founded after the war. There was a school which abolished in 2006. The book of the village is named Kylä keskelle korpea (The village among backwoods).
