= Iso Lamujärvi =

- Location within Finland
- Location: Pyhäntä municipality
- Coordinates: 64°01′N 26°15′E
- Type: Lake
- Primary outflows: Lamujoki
- Catchment area: Siikajoki
- Basin countries: Finland
- Surface area: 25.85 km^{2} (9.98 sq mi)
- Average depth: 3.2 m (10 ft)
- Max. depth: 11.69 m (38.4 ft)
- Water volume: 0.083 km^{3} (67,000 acre⋅ft)
- Shore length^{1}: 32.84 km (20.41 mi)
- Surface elevation: 136.6 m (448 ft)
- Frozen: December–May
- Islands: Honkasaari, Pikku Honkasaari, Kutusaari, Lehtosaari, Matinsaari, Pitkäsaari, Selkäsaari, Tölpänsaari.
- ^{1} Shore length is not a well-defined measure.

Iso Lamujärvi is a medium-sized lake in the Siikajoki main catchment area. It is located in the region Northern Ostrobothnia in Finland.

There are eight islands in the lake.

== See also ==
- List of lakes in Finland
