= Syöte National Park =

National park in Finland

- IUCN category II (national park)
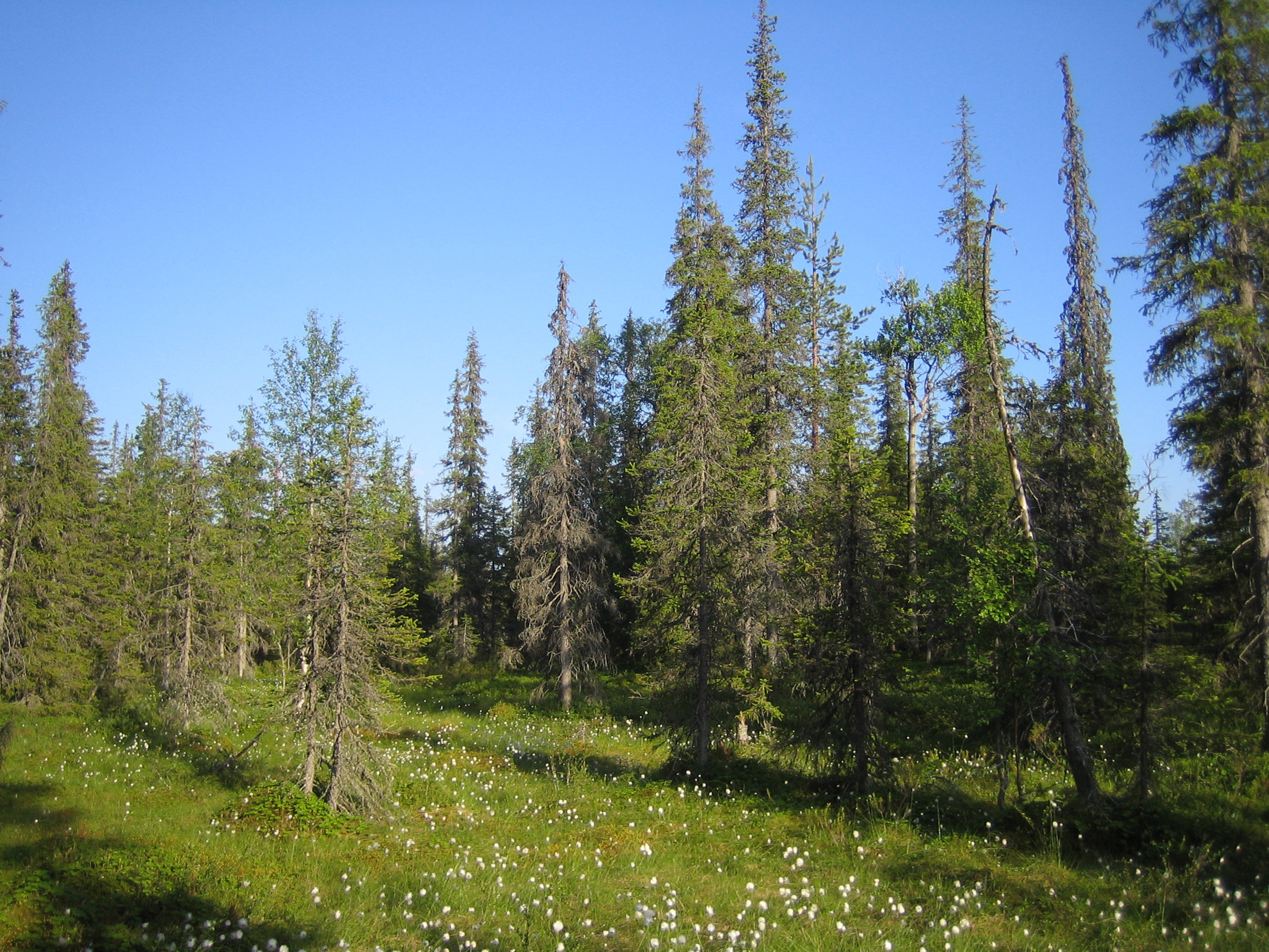

- Location within Finland
- Location: Finland
- Coordinates: 65°44′51″N 27°54′43″E
- Area: 299 km^{2} (115 sq mi)
- Established: 2000
- Visitors: 88,200 (in 2024)
- Governing body: Metsähallitus
- Website: https://www.luontoon.fi/en/destinations/syote-national-park

Syöte National Park (Syötteen kansallispuisto) is a national park in the area of Pudasjärvi, Posio and Taivalkoski municipalities, in Northern Ostrobothnia and Lapland regions of Finland. Syöte National Park is a chain of old-growth forests, part of which is high altitude forest. One fourth of the area of the park is covered by mires and wetlands of different types.

== See also ==
- Iso-Syöte
- List of national parks of Finland
- Protected areas of Finland
