= Finnish Air Force UFO sighting =

1969 UFO observation

The Finnish Air Force UFO sighting (Porin seitsemän ilmapalloa, "The seven balloons of Pori") was an incident wherein unidentified flying objects (UFOs) were observed on 12 April 1969 in Pori during military training exercises. It has the distinction of being the only UFO observation acknowledged by the Finnish Air Force, who suggested that it may have been due to foreign reconnaissance aircraft.

== Sighting ==
During a Fouga Magister jet training mission at Pori Airport on 12 April 1969, a Finnish Defence Forces flight controller told pilot-in-training Tarmo Tukeva to investigate seven balloons that were floating at approximately 1,500–3,000 metres (4,900–9,800 ft) above the airport. Tukeva reported that the objects were ball- or disc-shaped, but could not determine his distance to them. According to Tukeva, the objects accelerated away from him “at great speed”. Undetermined radar images were also later reported 200 kilometres (120 mi) away in Vaasa. A second pilot-in-training, Jouko Kuronen, says he overheard the radio communications between the flight controller and Tukeva as well as observing the objects. According to the Finnish Armed Forces magazine Ruotuväki, the 12 April reports were similar to other cases occurring over bodies of water during ongoing military exercises, and may have been due to "transnational spy planes or aircraft".

== See also ==
- UFOs of Pudasjärvi
