= Pudasjärvi Airfield =

Pudasjärvi Airfield Pudasjärven lentokenttä
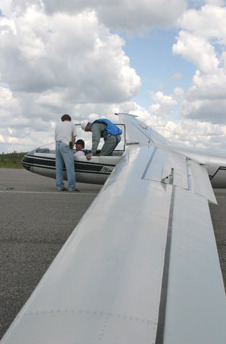
- A glider at Pudasjärvi Airfield
- IATA: none; ICAO: EFPU

Summary
- Operator: Town of Pudasjärvi
- Location: Pudasjärvi, Finland
- Elevation AMSL: 397 ft / 121 m
- Coordinates: 65°24′08″N 026°56′49″E
- Website: www.pudasjarvi.fi/...

Map
- Location within Finland

Runways
Direction	Length		Surface
Direction	m	ft	Surface
08/26	1,990	6,529	asphalt
- Source: VFR Finland

Pudasjärvi Airfield (ICAO: EFPU) (Finnish: Pudasjärven lentokenttä or Pudasjärven Ilmailukeskus) is an airfield in Pudasjärvi, Finland, about 5 kilometres (3 mi) north-northwest from Kurenalus, the Pudasjärvi town centre.

== See also ==
- List of airports in Finland
