= Kärsämäki =

- Municipality
- Kärsämäen kunta Kärsämäki kommun
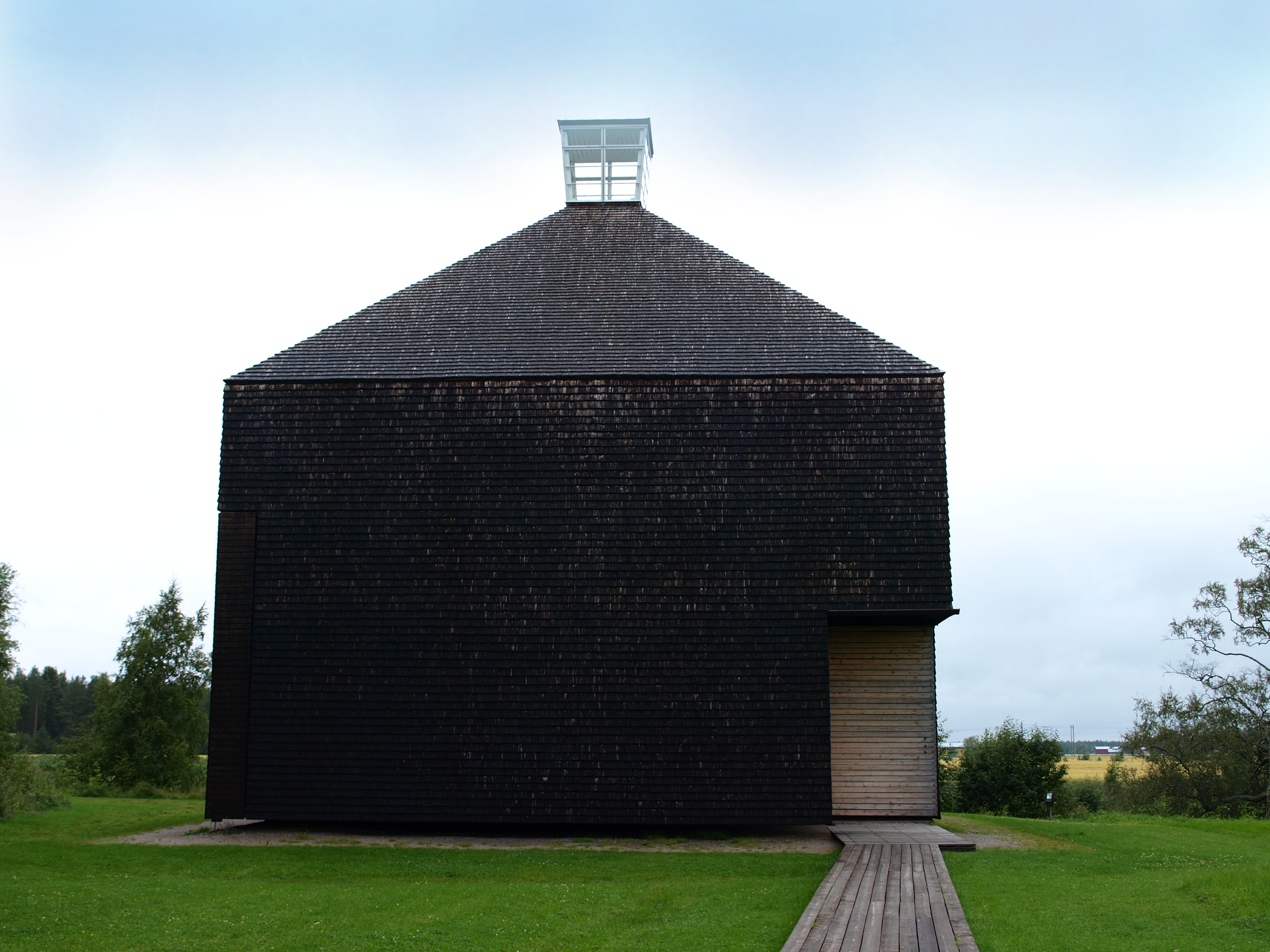
- Kärsämäki Church (Paanukirkko)

- Coat of arms

- Location of Kärsämäki in Finland
- Interactive map of Kärsämäki
- Coordinates: 63°58.5′N 025°45.5′E
- Country: Finland
- Region: North Ostrobothnia
- Sub-region: Nivala–Haapajärvi
- Charter: 1869

Government
  - Town manager: Riitta Hokkanen

Area (2018-01-01)
  - Total: 700.91 km^{2} (270.62 sq mi)
  - Land: 696.5 km^{2} (268.9 sq mi)
  - Water: 6.06 km^{2} (2.34 sq mi)
  - Rank: 121st largest in Finland

Population (2025-12-31)
  - Total: 2,324
  - Rank: 239th largest in Finland
  - Density: 3.34/km^{2} (8.7/sq mi)

Population by native language
  - Finnish: 98.4% (official)
  - Others: 1.6%

Population by age
  - 0 to 14: 17.7%
  - 15 to 64: 53.9%
  - 65 or older: 28.4%
- Time zone: UTC+02:00 (EET)
  - Summer (DST): UTC+03:00 (EEST)
- Website: karsamaki.fi

Kärsämäki (Finnish pronunciation: [ˈkærsæˌmæki]; literally meaning "snout hill") is a municipality of Finland. It is located in the province of Oulu and is part of the Northern Ostrobothnia region. The municipality has a population of 2,324 (31 December 2025) and covers an area of 700.91 square kilometres (270.62 sq mi) of which 6.06 km^{2} (2.34 sq mi) is water. The population density is 3.34 inhabitants per square kilometre (8.7/sq mi). Kärsämäki is a significant road junction where Highway 4 (Helsinki–Oulu–Utsjoki) and Highway 28 (Kokkola–Kajaani) intersect and where Highway 58 leading to Kangasala begins. The distance to the regional capital Oulu is 123 kilometres (76 mi).

Neighbour municipalities are Haapajärvi, Haapavesi, Pyhäjärvi, Pyhäntä and Siikalatva. The previous neighboring municipality was Piippola, which was merged with the municipality of Siikalatva in 2009. The municipality is unilingually Finnish.

The explanation of the coat of arms of the municipality of Kärsämäki is "in the silver field the terrace and the boat, both blue, seven red fire tabs rise from the boat." The subject of the coat of arms refers to the name of the village of Venetpalo, which in turn comes from the tribal battles with the Tavastians. The village is told by the Tavastians shout ”Veneet palaa!” (lit. "Boats are burning!") according to local the villagers, set fire to the raiding boats on fire. The coat of arms was designed by Gustaf von Numers and approved by the Kärsämäki Municipal Council at its meeting on June 23, 1964. The coat of arms was approved for use by the Ministry of the Interior on October 5 of the same year.

== Geography ==
=== Nature ===
The most common soil type is till. In terms of surface shape, Kärsämäki is a gently sloping expanse, in which case the terrain rises only when going southeast; of these, the highest elevations in the Saviselkä village area rise up to 180 metres (590 ft).

Over 60% of the area is swamp. Bigges swamps are Kärsämäenneva, Lauttaneva, Onkineva and Vellihonganneva.

The Pyhäjoki river flows through Kärsämäki. Another significant river is Hautajoki along the village by the same name.

=== Villages ===
Alajoki, Kärsämäki (Kirkonkylä), Miiluranta, Ojalehto, Porkkala, Pyrrönperä, Rannankylä, Saviselkä, Sydänmaankylä and Venetpalo.

== History ==
The original name of Kärsämäki was Kärsämä, with the word mäki (hill) being added to it later. This change has happened to other settlement names, as Pieksämäki, Elimäki and Längelmäki were originally known as Pieksämä, Elimä and Längelmä.

The village was first mentioned in 1556 as Kärsemby. It was a part of the Pyhäjoki parish, gaining its own church in 1764 and becoming an independent parish and municipality in 1856.

== Demographics ==
At the end of 2018, Kärsämäki had 2,611 inhabitants, of which 1,188 lived in urban area, 1,407 in sparsely populated areas and the residences of 16 were unknown. The degree of agglomeration in Kärsämäki is 45.8%. There is only one urban in the municipality, the church village of Kärsämäki.

== Culture ==
=== Food ===
In the 1980s, Kärsämäki's traditional parish dishes were elsuupa cooked from rice, raisins and bread cheese, a potato-pork casserole called läksloota and the rieska bread.

== Notable people ==
- Berndt Leonard Frosterus
- Aappo Luomajoki
- Markku Koski
- Kalevi Hemilä
- Paula Vesala
- Matti Ristinen
- Sasu Paavola

== See also ==
- Finnish national road 58
