= Kauko Tuupainen =

Finnish accountant and politician

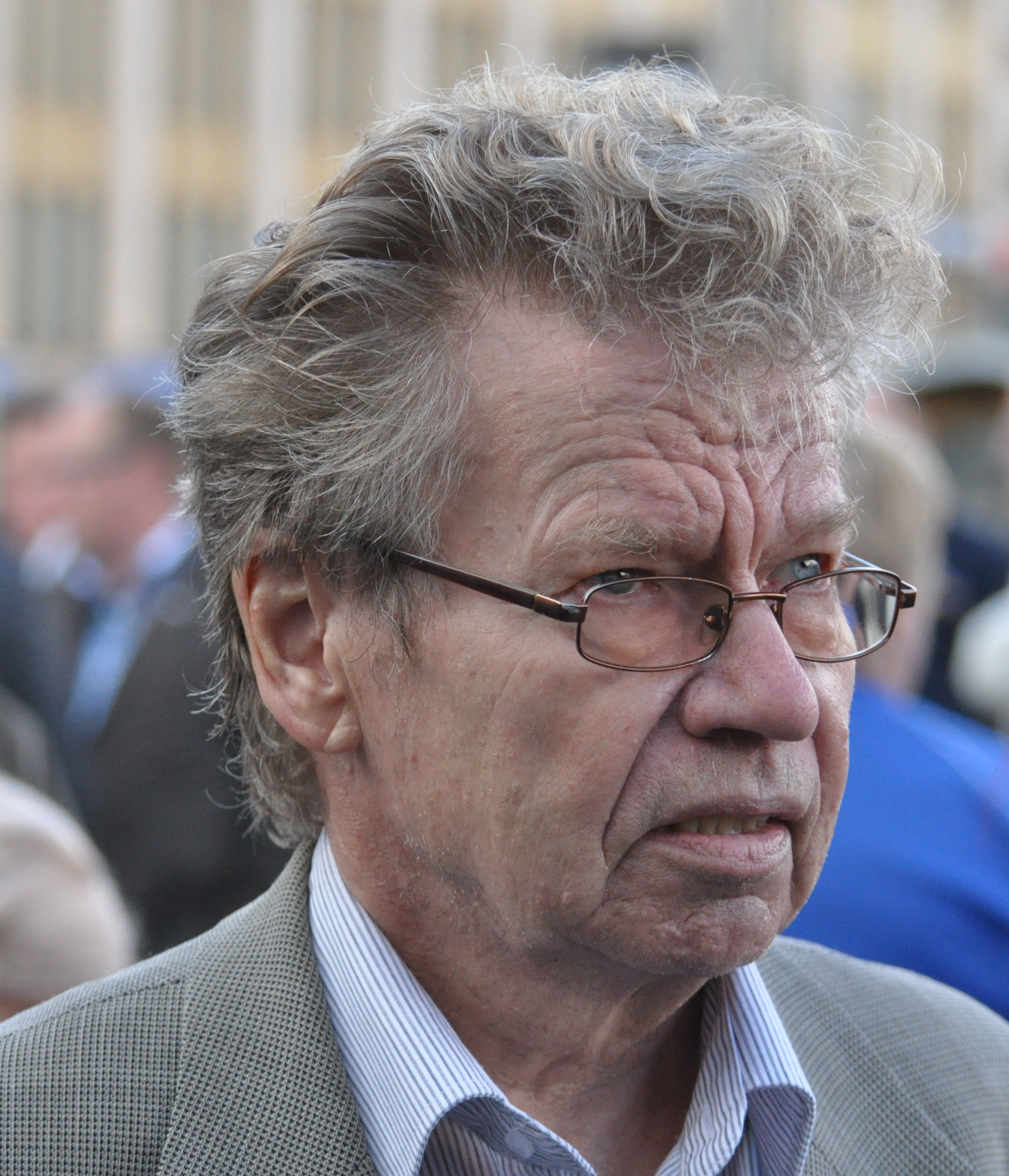
Tuupainen in 2011

Kauko Ilmari Tuupainen (born 8 May 1940 in Kalajoki) is a Finnish accountant and politician. He was a member of the Parliament of Finland between 2011 and 2015, representing the Finns Party.
