= Oulainen =

- Town
- Oulaisten kaupunki Oulainens stad
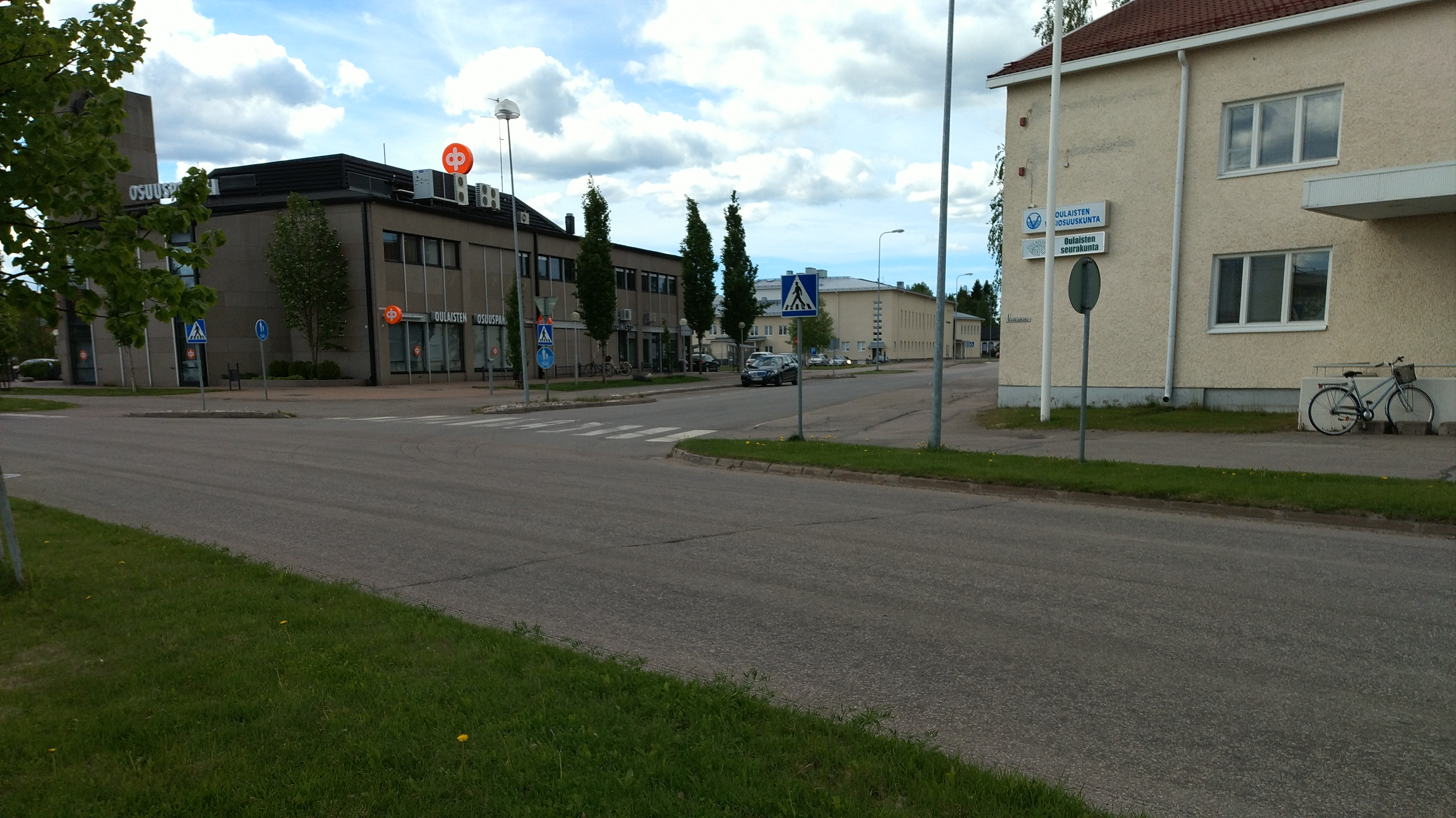
- The town center of Oulainen in 2017.

- Coat of arms
- Motto: Syntyy ja tapahtuu.
- Location of Oulainen in Finland
- Interactive map of Oulainen
- Coordinates: 64°16′N 024°49′E
- Country: Finland
- Region: North Ostrobothnia
- Sub-region: Ylivieska
- Charter: 1865
- City rights: 1977

Government
  - Town manager: Riikka Moilanen

Area (2018-01-01)
  - Total: 597.53 km^{2} (230.71 sq mi)
  - Land: 587.84 km^{2} (226.97 sq mi)
  - Water: 10.01 km^{2} (3.86 sq mi)
  - Rank: 143rd largest in Finland

Population (2025-12-31)
  - Total: 6,832
  - Rank: 134th largest in Finland
  - Density: 11.62/km^{2} (30.1/sq mi)

Population by native language
  - Finnish: 97.3% (official)
  - Others: 2.7%

Population by age
  - 0 to 14: 17.5%
  - 15 to 64: 54.9%
  - 65 or older: 27.6%
- Time zone: UTC+02:00 (EET)
  - Summer (DST): UTC+03:00 (EEST)
- Website: www.oulainen.fi

Oulainen (Swedish: Oulainen, also Oulais) is a town and a municipality of Finland. It is located in the Northern Ostrobothnia region, 101 kilometres (63 mi) south of the city of Oulu. The municipality has a population of 6,832 (31 December 2025) and covers an area of 597.53 square kilometres (230.71 sq mi) of which 10.01 km^{2} (3.86 sq mi) is water. The population density is 11.62 inhabitants per square kilometre (30.1/sq mi). Oulainen is founded in 1865, and it received township rights in 1977.

The municipality is unilingually Finnish. The municipality has previously also been known as "Oulais" in Swedish documents, but is today referred to as "Oulainen" also in Swedish.

== Geography ==
Neighbouring municipalities are Alavieska, Haapavesi, Merijärvi, Pyhäjoki, Raahe and Ylivieska. In addition to the town center, the municipality includes the villages of Kilpua, Lehtopää, Matkaniva, Petäjäskoski, Piipsjärvi and Honkaranta.

== Railway station ==
Oulainen
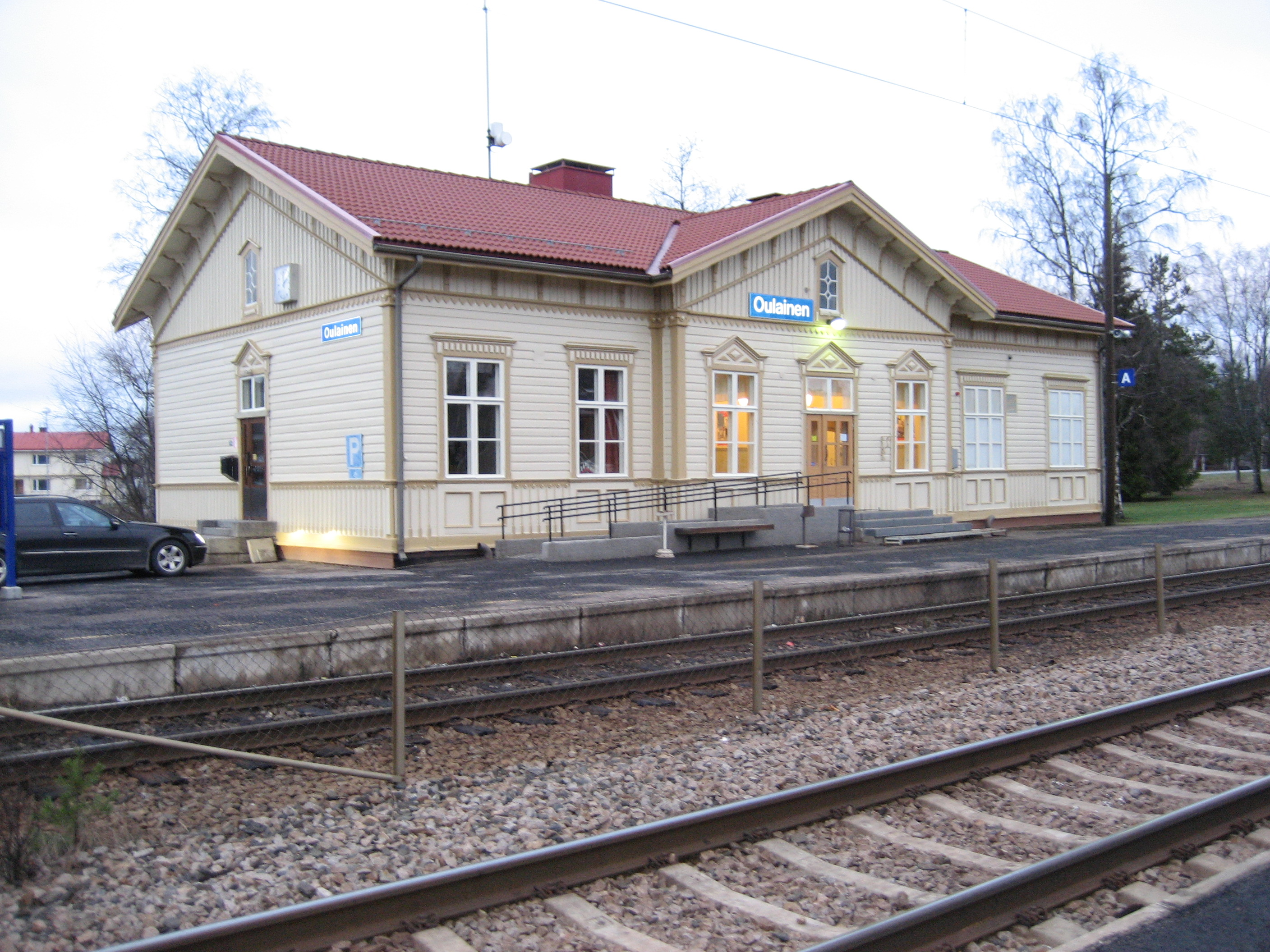

General information
- Location: Rautatienkatu 8, 83600 Oulainen
- Coordinates: 64.26953°N 24.82128°E
- System: VR Group station
- Owner: Finnish Transport Agency
- Platforms: 3

Construction
- Structure type: ground station

History
- Opened: 1886
Location

Oulainen railway station is located in the center of the town. The station has three platforms each with designated boarding areas, a ticket vending machine, car parking and a bicycle stand. It was opened in 1886.

== History ==
Oulainen was first mentioned in 1572 as Oulahais and as a part of the Pyhäjoki parish. A farm named Oulahainen was established earlier. The name comes from a dialectal word oulu meaning "flooding waters" (see also Oulu) and seems to suggest a Tavastian origin. Alpo Räisänen suggests that the name could be of Savonian or Karelian origin.

Oulainen became a chapel community in 1682, a parish in 1870, a kauppala in 1967 and a town in 1977.

== Events ==
Notable annual events include the National Veteran Machines Fair (Waltakunnalliset Weteraanikonepäivät) and Oulainen Music Weeks (Oulaisten Musiikkiviikot). Oulainen Music Weeks were organized for the twentieth time in 2006. The Oulainen Youth Choir (Oulaisten Nuorisokuoro) has received international acclaim.

== Notable people ==
- Eeli Erkkilä, Minister and Member of Parliament
- Elsi Hetemäki-Olander, Member of Parliament
- Katja Hänninen, Member of Parliament
- Merja Kiviranta, triathlonist
- Rosa-Maria Ryyti, model and Miss Finland 2015 beauty pageant titleholder

== See also ==
- Oulainen railway station
