= Elsi Hetemäki =

Finnish politician (1927–2023)

- Born: Elsi Maria Rinne; 26 September 1927; Oulainen, Finnish
- Died: 3 December 2023 (96 years old); Finnish
- Occupations: teacher, politician
- Political party: National Coalition Party
- Spouse: Eero Hetemäki ( casados 1954-1968)<ik Olander ( casados en 1977; m. 1998)

Elsi Maria Hetemäki-Olander (née Rinne; 26 September 1927 – 3 December 2023) was a Finnish secondary school teacher and politician. She was a member of the Parliament of Finland from 1970 to 1991, representing the National Coalition Party. Hetemäki-Olander died on 3 December 2023, at the age of 96.
