= Pyhäntä =

- Municipality
- Pyhännän kunta Pyhäntä kommun
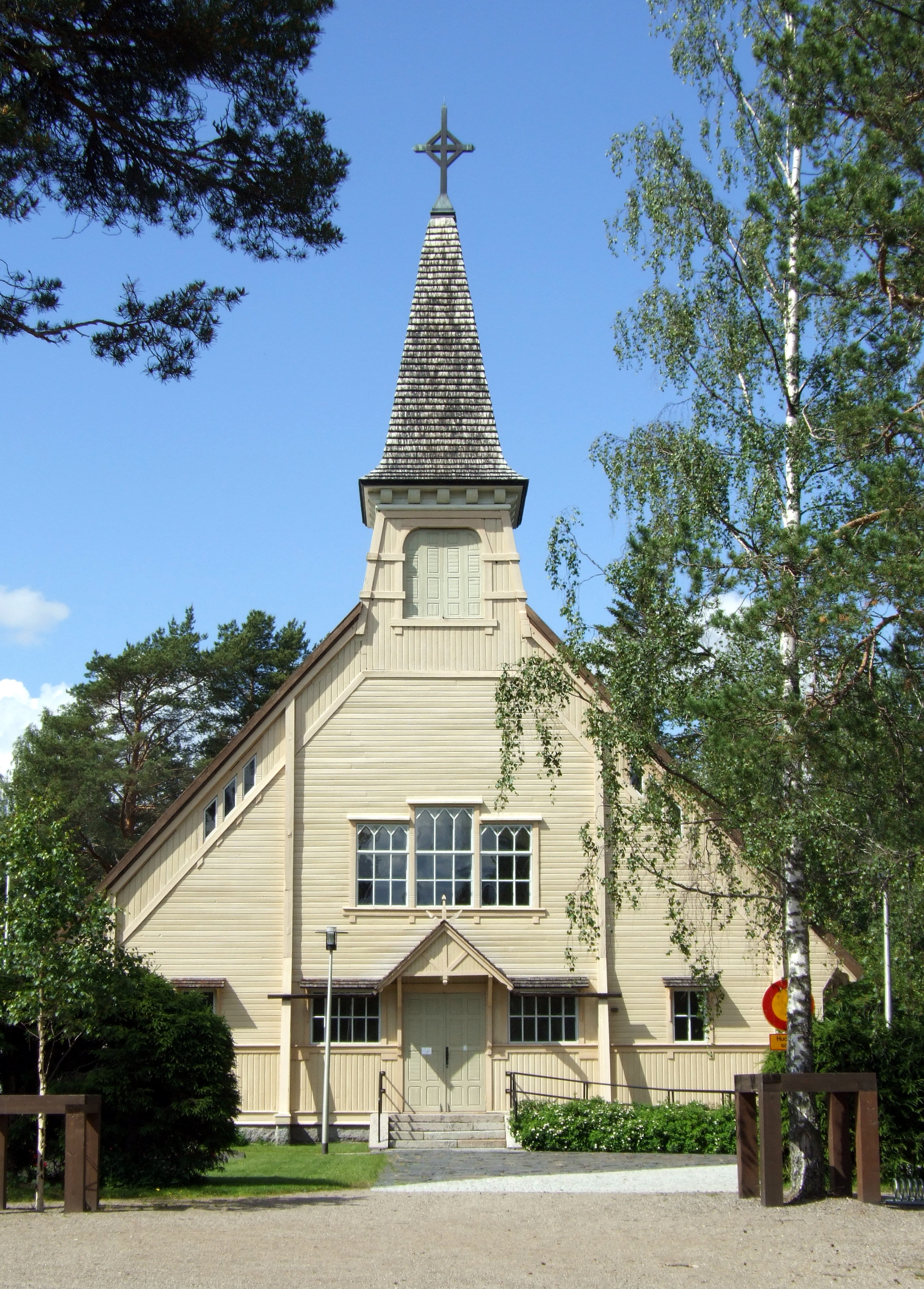
- Pyhäntä Church

- Coat of arms

- Location of Pyhäntä in Finland
- Interactive map of Pyhäntä
- Coordinates: 64°06′N 026°20′E
- Country: Finland
- Region: North Ostrobothnia
- Sub-region: Siikalatva
- Charter: 1899

Government
  - Municipal manager: Samuli Yrjänä

Area (2018-01-01)
  - Total: 847.48 km^{2} (327.21 sq mi)
  - Land: 810.16 km^{2} (312.80 sq mi)
  - Water: 36.72 km^{2} (14.18 sq mi)
  - Rank: 96th largest in Finland

Population (2025-12-31)
  - Total: 1,678
  - Rank: 275th largest in Finland
  - Density: 2.07/km^{2} (5.4/sq mi)

Population by native language
  - Finnish: 88.9% (official)
  - Others: 11.1%

Population by age
  - 0 to 14: 21.7%
  - 15 to 64: 54.9%
  - 65 or older: 23.4%
- Time zone: UTC+02:00 (EET)
  - Summer (DST): UTC+03:00 (EEST)
- Website: www.pyhanta.fi

Pyhäntä is a municipality of Finland. It is located in the Northern Ostrobothnia region. The municipality has a population of 1,678 (31 December 2025) and covers an area of 847.48 square kilometres (327.21 sq mi) of which 36.72 km^{2} (14.18 sq mi) is water. The population density is 2.07 inhabitants per square kilometre (5.4/sq mi). The municipality is unilingually Finnish.

== Geography ==
Neighbouring municipalities are Kajaani, Kiuruvesi, Kärsämäki, Pyhäjärvi, Siikalatva, and Vieremä.

=== Nature ===
There are several conservation areas located in the municipality. About 60% of the area is covered by swamps. Surface variation is larger compared to typical flat landscape in Ostrobothnia. One of the biggest lakes in the region is Iso Lamujärvi.

=== Villages ===
- Ahokylä
- Ojalankylä
- Lamujoki
- Tavastkenkä
- Viitamäki
