= Lake Pyhäjärvi (Pyhäjärvi) =

Lake in Pyhäjärvi, Northern Ostrobothnia, Finland

Pyhäjärvi
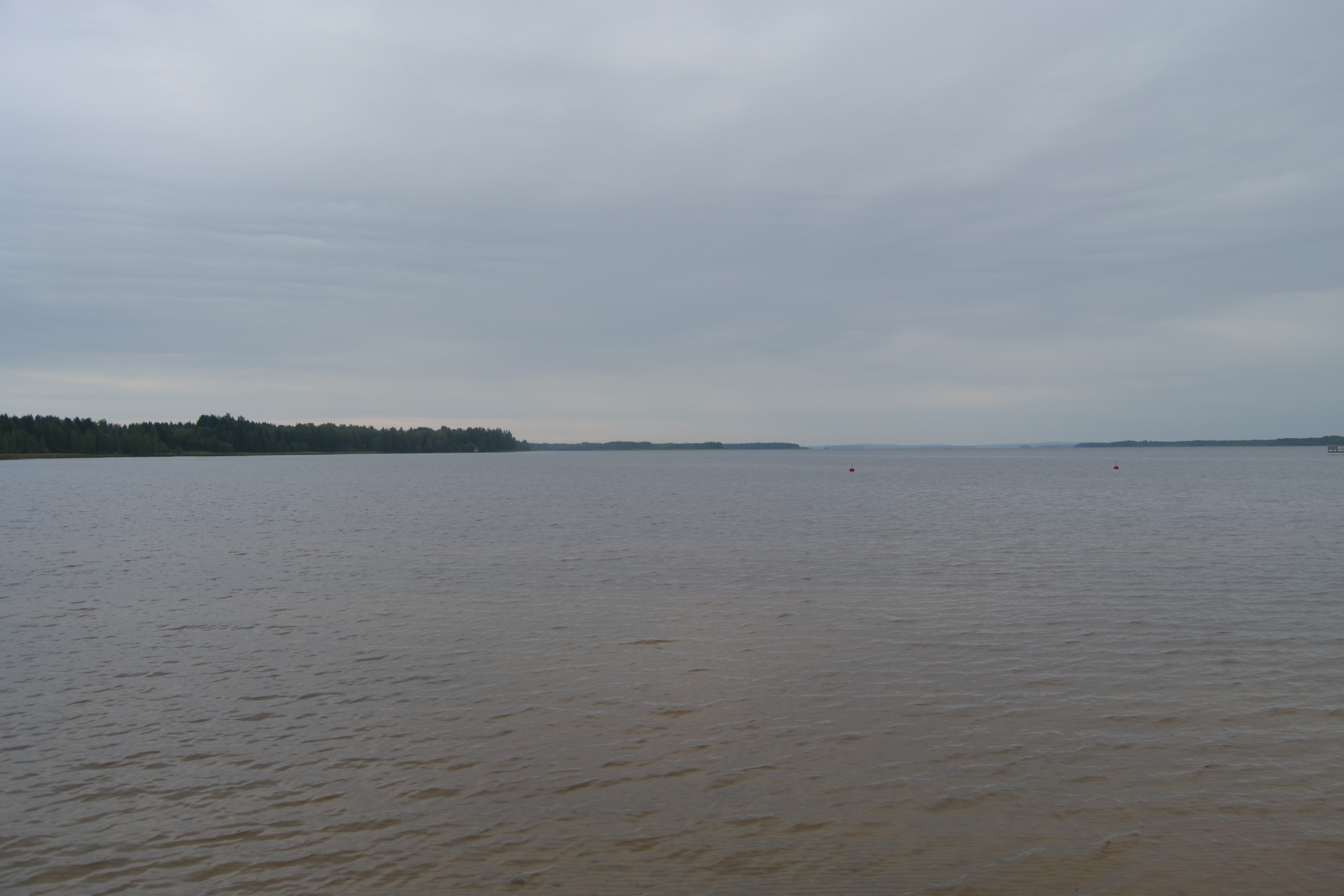
- Pyhäjärvi in Emolahti

- Location within Finland
- Location: Pyhäjärvi, Finland
- Coordinates: 63°35′N 025°57′E
- Primary inflows: Komujoki
- Primary outflows: Pyhäjoki
- Basin countries: Finland
- Surface area: 121.8 km^{2} (47.0 sq mi)
- Average depth: 6.27 m (20.6 ft)
- Max. depth: 27 m (89 ft)
- Water volume: 770,000,000 m^{3} (2.7×10^{10} cu ft)
- Shore length^{1}: 244.5 km (151.9 mi)
- Surface elevation: 139–140 m (456–459 ft)
- Frozen: December–April
- ^{1} Shore length is not a well-defined measure.

Pyhäjärvi is a large lake in Pyhäjärvi, Finland. It belongs to the Pyhäjoki main catchment area. Pyhäjärvi (lit. holy lake) is a very common name in Finland. There are 39 lakes with the same name.

== See also ==
- List of lakes in Finland
