= Kalajoki =

- Town
- Kalajoen kaupunki Kalajoki stad
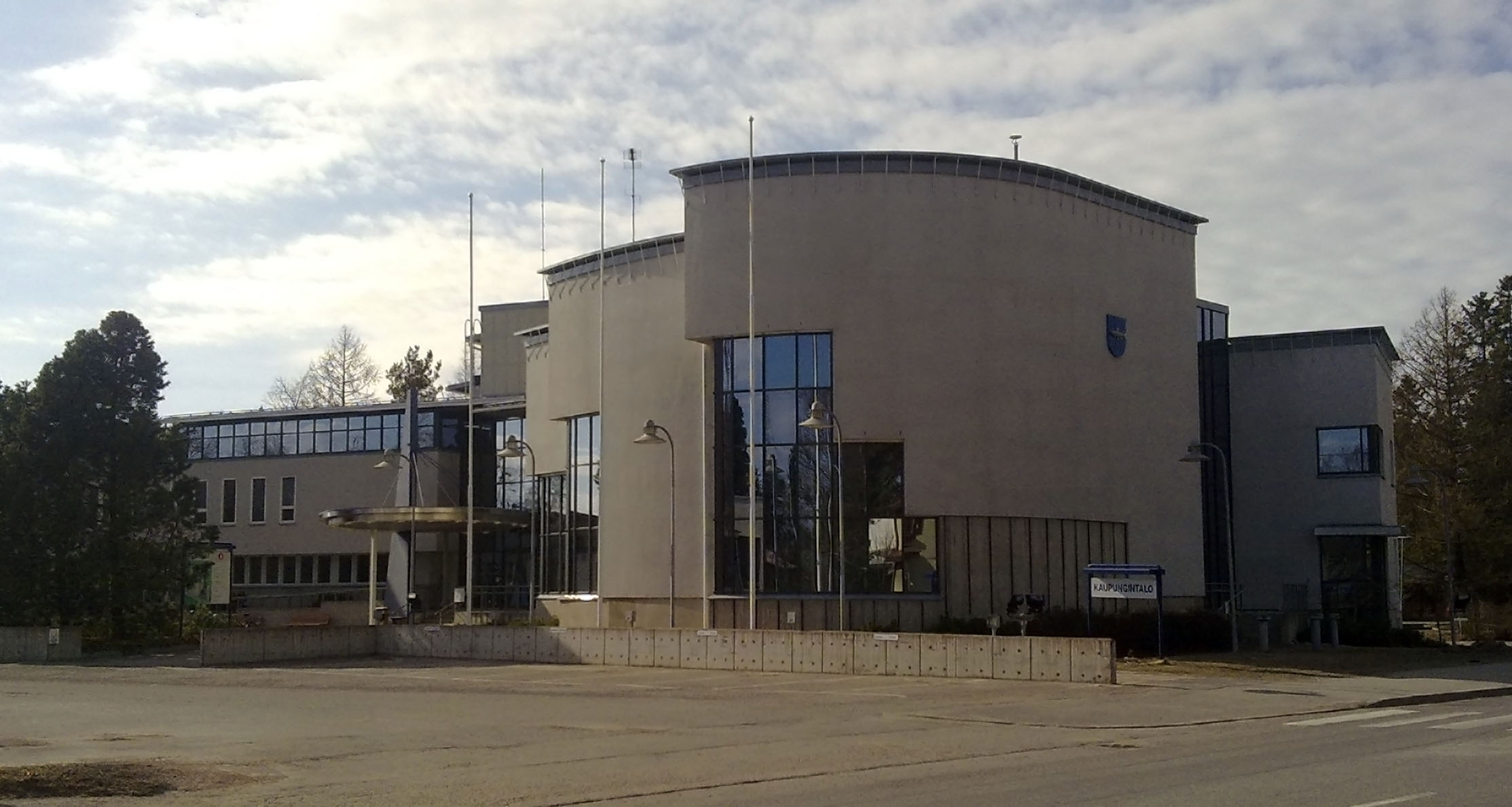
- Kalajoki Town Hall

- Coat of arms

- Location of Kalajoki in Finland
- Interactive map of Kalajoki
- Coordinates: 64°16′N 023°57′E
- Country: Finland
- Region: North Ostrobothnia
- Sub-region: Ylivieska
- Charter: 1865
- Town privileges: 2002

Government
  - Town manager: Jukka Puoskari

Area (2018-01-01)
  - Total: 2,391.30 km^{2} (923.29 sq mi)
  - Land: 924.1 km^{2} (356.8 sq mi)
  - Water: 1,469.15 km^{2} (567.24 sq mi)
  - Rank: 84th largest in Finland

Population (2025-12-31)
  - Total: 12,155
  - Rank: 84th largest in Finland
  - Density: 13.15/km^{2} (34.1/sq mi)

Population by native language
  - Finnish: 95.9% (official)
  - Swedish: 0.4%
  - Others: 3.7%

Population by age
  - 0 to 14: 18.1%
  - 15 to 64: 55.7%
  - 65 or older: 26.2%
- Time zone: UTC+02:00 (EET)
  - Summer (DST): UTC+03:00 (EEST)
- Website: www.kalajoki.fi

Kalajoki (Finnish pronunciation: [ˈkɑlɑˌjoki]; literally translated the "fish river") is a coastal town and municipality of Finland. It is located in the immediate vicinity of the Gulf of Bothnia in the province of Oulu and is part of the Northern Ostrobothnia region.

The town has a population of 12,155 (31 December 2025) and covers an area of 2,391.30 square kilometres (923.29 sq mi) of which 1,469.15 km^{2} (567.24 sq mi) is water. The population density is 13.15 inhabitants per square kilometre (34.1/sq mi).

The municipality is unilingually Finnish.

== History ==
The first reference to Kalajoki can be found from the beginning of 16th century and it got the status of a parish in 1525, it was designated as a regional parish in 1545. This status ended with the abolishment of the parish form of organization in the early 1860s. Kalajoki was a significant market place and controlled the whole region's tar trading. By the end of 19th century the meaning of tar was diminishing as a good and the importance of Kalajoki was reduced thereafter.

The tar trade was a derivative of the forestry industry, and Kalajoki has long been the location of forestry activities. There are still sawmills in operation in the city today.

In addition to tar trading, Kalajoki has long been a farming community, producing a variety of agricultural products, including wheat and rye. There are many farms still operating in the city, and there is a weekly market during the spring and summer months where local farmers and merchants sell their products.

== Government ==
There were many attempts to reorganize Kalajoki as a city, which would confer additional authorities on the municipality. The first attempt was in 1865, and there were several subsequent attempts throughout the 20th century. Kalajoki was finally reorganized as a city in 2002.

Just like any municipality in Finland, the city of Kalajoki is composed of several sub-units, called a kylä. The following compose the city of Kalajoki: Vasankari, Plassi, Mehtäkylä, Pohjankylä, Pitkäsenkylä, Etelänkylä, Kääntä, Tynkä, Rahja, Kurikkala, Kärkinen, Typpö, Rautio.

Every four years, the voters of Kalajoki elect a city council of 35 members which meets monthly. The Council then elects a governing council of nine members that meets more regularly to transact the business of the city. As of the most recent municipal election in 2004, 19 members of the city council are from the Centre Party, six are from the local Pro Kalajoki Party, four are from the centre-right National Coalition Party, three are from the Left Alliance, two are from the centre-left Social Democratic Party, and one member is from the Christian Democrats Party.

The next municipal elections will be held throughout Finland in 2012.

The municipality of Rautio was consolidated with Kalajoki in 1973. The neighboring municipality of Himanka was consolidated with Kalajoki on 1 January 2010.

== Tourism ==
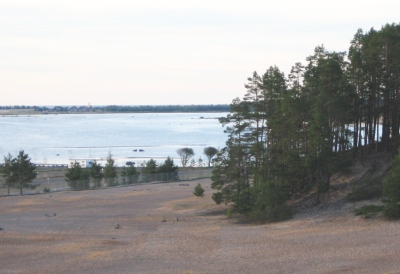
Sandy beaches of Kalajoki

Kalajoki is a well known tourist attraction place in Finland due to long sandy beaches at shores of the Bothnian Bay, and related activities.

== People born in Kalajoki ==
- Kalle Myllylä (1844 – 1923)
- Tuomas Pohjanpalo (1861 – 1933)
- Leonard Typpö (1868 – 1922; born in Rautio)
- Sakari Ainali (1874 – 1938; born in Himanka)
- Wäinö Palmqvist (1882 — 1964)
- Vilho Kivioja (1896 – 1977)
- Elias Simojoki (1899 – 1940; born in Rautio)
- Kauko Tuupainen (1940 – )
- Antti Haapakoski (1971 – )
- Rainer Nygård (1972 – )
- Jussi Jokinen (1983 – )
- Juho Jokinen (1986 – )
- Benedek Oláh table tennis player (1992 – )
- Jaakko Rahja (1872 – 1926)

== International relations ==
=== Twin towns — Sister cities ===
Kalajoki is twinned with:

- Izumo, Shimane, Japan (2003)
- Taki, Japan
- Vansbro, Sweden

== See also ==
- Kallankari Islands
