= Pudasjärvi =

- Town
- Pudasjärven kaupunki Pudasjärvi stad
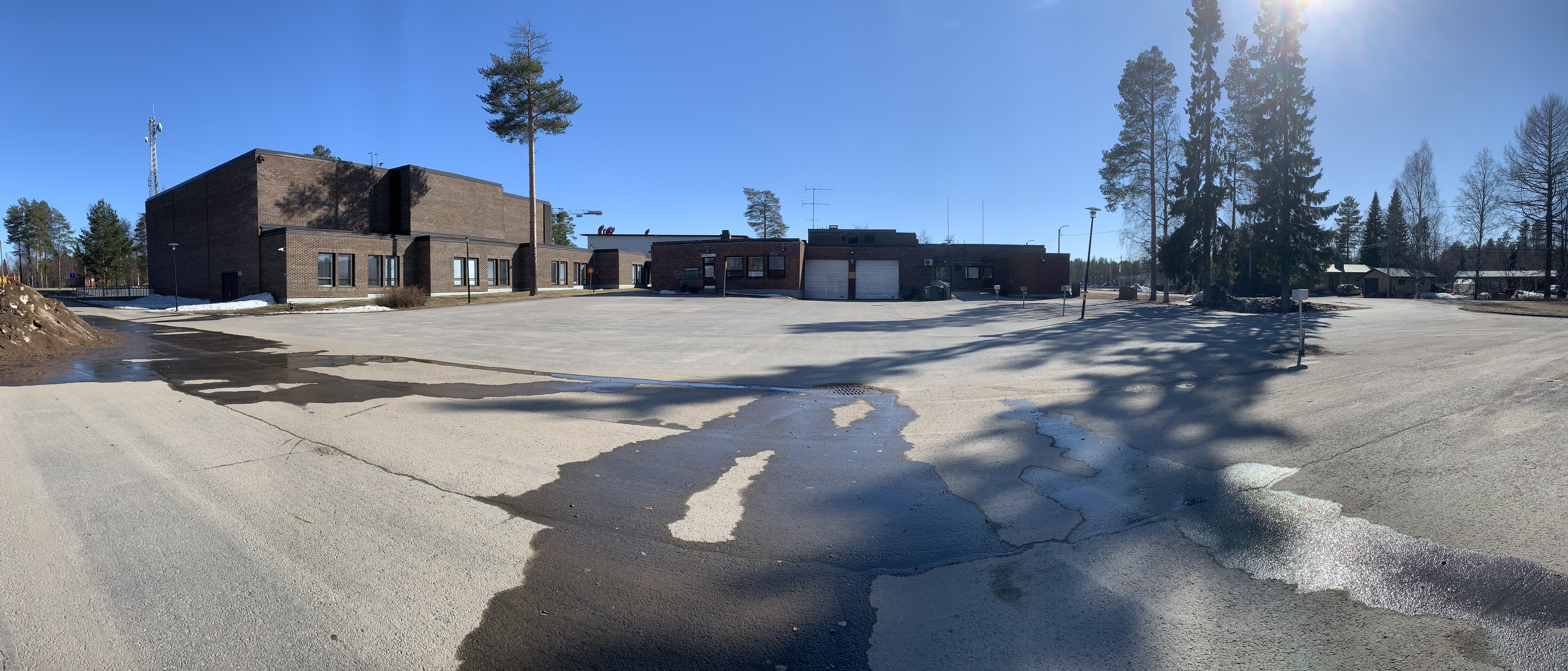

- Coat of arms

- Location of Pudasjärvi in Finland
- Interactive map of Pudasjärvi
- Coordinates: 65°21.5′N 027°00′E
- Country: Finland
- Region: North Ostrobothnia
- Sub-region: Oulunkaari
- Established: 1865
- City rights: 2004

Government

Area (2018-01-01)
  - Total: 5,867.23 km^{2} (2,265.35 sq mi)
  - Land: 5,638.67 km^{2} (2,177.10 sq mi)
  - Water: 228.67 km^{2} (88.29 sq mi)
  - Rank: 8th largest in Finland

Population (2025-12-31)
  - Total: 7,168
  - Rank: 129th largest in Finland
  - Density: 1.27/km^{2} (3.3/sq mi)

Population by native language
  - Finnish: 97.9% (official)
  - Swedish: 0.2%
  - Others: 1.9%

Population by age
  - 0 to 14: 15.4%
  - 15 to 64: 52.2%
  - 65 or older: 32.4%
- Time zone: UTC+02:00 (EET)
  - Summer (DST): UTC+03:00 (EEST)
- Website: www.pudasjarvi.fi

Pudasjärvi (Finnish pronunciation: [ˈpudɑsˌjærʋi]) is a town and a municipality of Finland. It is located in the province of Oulu and is part of the Northern Ostrobothnia region, 87 kilometres (54 mi) northeast of the city of Oulu and 130 kilometres (81 mi) southwest of the town of Kuusamo. The town has a population of 7,168 (31 December 2025) and covers an area of 5,867.23 square kilometres (2,265.35 sq mi) of which 228.67 km^{2} (88.29 sq mi) is water. The population density is 1.27 inhabitants per square kilometre (3.3/sq mi). In terms of area, Pudasjärvi is the second largest township in Finland (as of 2006, Rovaniemi is the largest) and one of the largest in the world. It's also one of the most sparsely inhabited.

Pudasjärvi is famed for its nature, and is the home of the southernmost fell area in Finland, Syöte. The oldest dated rock formations within the European Union can be found in Siuruankylä, Pudasjärvi. The trondhjemite gneiss is aged 3,500 million years.

Two Finnish melodic death metal bands, Kalmah and Eternal Tears of Sorrow formed in Pudasjärvi.

The Big Dipper and the bear of the Pudasjärvi's coat of arms are based on the old seal of the parish keeper. The coat of arms was designed by Gustaf von Numers, and the Pudasjärvi town council approved it at its meeting on August 2, 1950. The Ministry of the Interior approved the coat of arms for use on September 26 of the same year.

Pudasjärvi has been compared to the city of Roswell, New Mexico due to its UFO sightings; many sightings were made in the municipality and its surrounding areas in the late 1960s and early 1970s.

== History ==
Pudasjärvi town was named after the Pudasjärvi village, which was named after the Pudasjärvi lake, meaning "Anabranch Lake". However, the original Pudasjärvi village is no longer the center of the town. The current center is known as Kurenalus. As people have started calling the center Kurenalus with the name "Pudasjärvi", the original Pudasjärvi village has gained the additional name Riekinranta.

== Climate ==
Pudasjärvi has a subarctic climate (Köppen: Dfc) with long, cold winters and short, mild summers.

Climate data for Pudasjärvi airport (1991-2020 normals, extremes 1959-1999 in Kurenalus, 1999-present in the airport)
Month	Jan	Feb	Mar	Apr	May	Jun	Jul	Aug	Sep	Oct	Nov	Dec	Year
Record high °C (°F)	8.5 (47.3)	7.0 (44.6)	10.0 (50.0)	19.5 (67.1)	28.9 (84.0)	31.8 (89.2)	32.4 (90.3)	30.5 (86.9)	23.9 (75.0)	18.9 (66.0)	9.8 (49.6)	6.2 (43.2)	32.4 (90.3)
Mean maximum °C (°F)	2.0 (35.6)	2.4 (36.3)	5.7 (42.3)	13.6 (56.5)	22.6 (72.7)	25.8 (78.4)	27.5 (81.5)	25.3 (77.5)	19.4 (66.9)	11.3 (52.3)	5.7 (42.3)	2.9 (37.2)	28.3 (82.9)
Mean daily maximum °C (°F)	−6.6 (20.1)	−6.2 (20.8)	−1.0 (30.2)	5.1 (41.2)	12.5 (54.5)	18.2 (64.8)	21.2 (70.2)	18.4 (65.1)	12.3 (54.1)	4.5 (40.1)	−0.9 (30.4)	−4.1 (24.6)	6.1 (43.0)
Daily mean °C (°F)	−10.1 (13.8)	−10.1 (13.8)	−5.7 (21.7)	0.5 (32.9)	7.4 (45.3)	13.2 (55.8)	16.2 (61.2)	13.7 (56.7)	8.3 (46.9)	1.8 (35.2)	−3.3 (26.1)	−7.2 (19.0)	2.1 (35.7)
Mean daily minimum °C (°F)	−14.3 (6.3)	−14.5 (5.9)	−10.7 (12.7)	−4.0 (24.8)	2.4 (36.3)	8.0 (46.4)	11.3 (52.3)	9.1 (48.4)	4.7 (40.5)	−0.7 (30.7)	−6.0 (21.2)	−10.8 (12.6)	−2.1 (28.2)
Mean minimum °C (°F)	−30.5 (−22.9)	−30.4 (−22.7)	−26.0 (−14.8)	−15.4 (4.3)	−4.5 (23.9)	1.3 (34.3)	4.8 (40.6)	1.3 (34.3)	−3.3 (26.1)	−11.5 (11.3)	−19.1 (−2.4)	−26.8 (−16.2)	−33.6 (−28.5)
Record low °C (°F)	−41.3 (−42.3)	−43.0 (−45.4)	−37.7 (−35.9)	−26.7 (−16.1)	−11.4 (11.5)	−2.2 (28.0)	−2.0 (28.4)	−3.6 (25.5)	−9.8 (14.4)	−25.7 (−14.3)	−33.8 (−28.8)	−40.2 (−40.4)	−43.0 (−45.4)
Average precipitation mm (inches)	36 (1.4)	32 (1.3)	30 (1.2)	27 (1.1)	50 (2.0)	58 (2.3)	78 (3.1)	68 (2.7)	57 (2.2)	56 (2.2)	51 (2.0)	43 (1.7)	586 (23.2)
Average precipitation days (≥ 1.0 mm)	9	9	8	7	10	10	11	10	10	10	11	11	116
Average relative humidity (%)	88	87	80	73	67	66	71	78	84	90	92	90	81
Source 1: FMI normals 1991-2020
Source 2: Record highs and lows 1959- present

== Politics ==
Results of the 2023 Finnish parliamentary election in Pudasjärvi:

- Centre Party 50.5%
- Finns Party 25.2%
- Social Democratic Party 7.4%
- Left Alliance 5.3%
- National Coalition Party 4.6%
- Christian Democrats 2.0%
- Freedom Alliance 1.6%
- Green League 1.4%
- Movement Now 1.4%

== See also ==
- Kouva
- Pudasjärvi Airfield
- UFOs of Pudasjärvi

== Twin town ==
- Óbuda-Békásmegyer, Hungary (2010)
