= Merijärvi =

- Municipality
- Merijärven kunta Merijärvi kommun
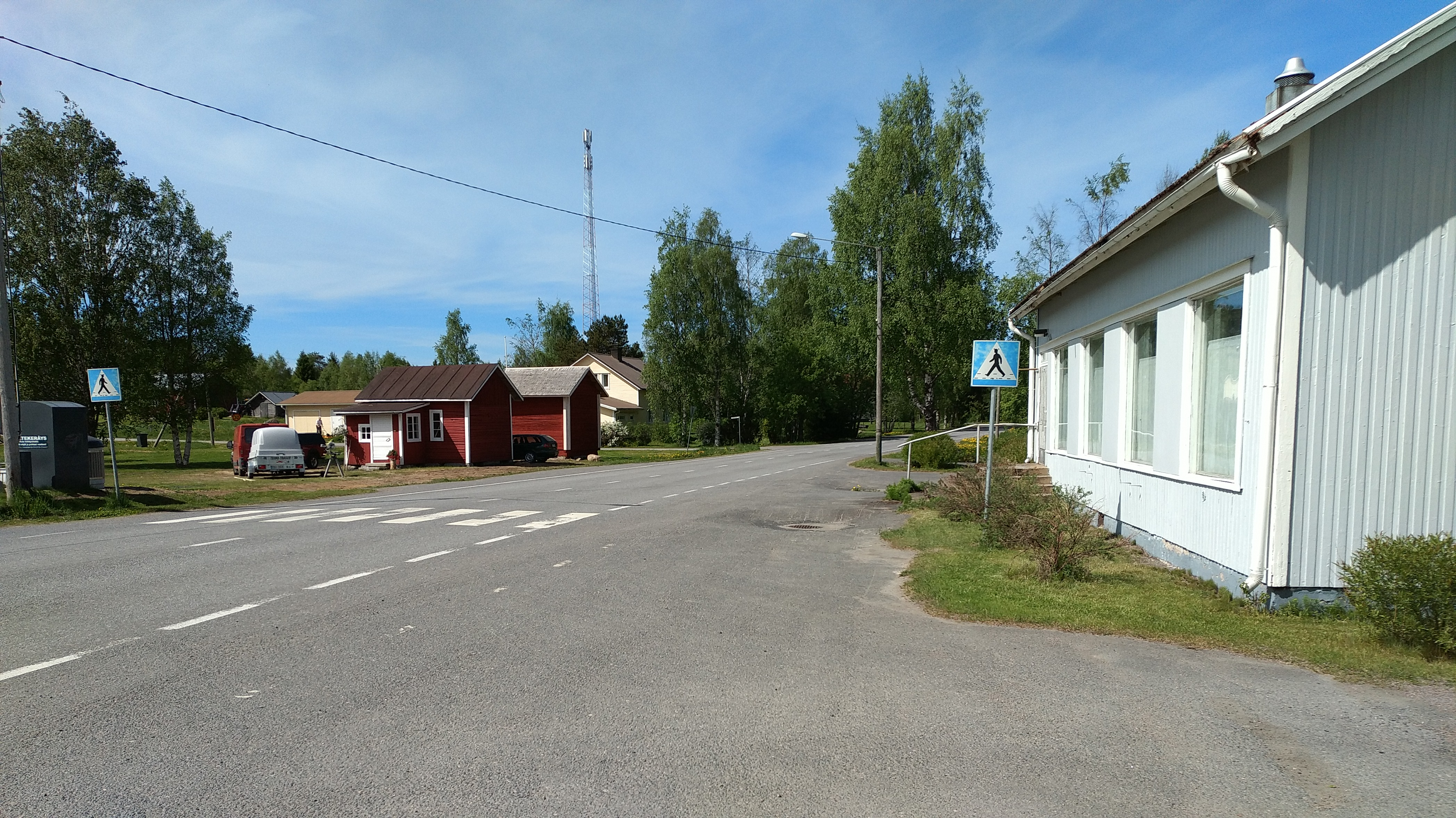

- Coat of arms

- Location of Merijärvi in Finland
- Interactive map of Merijärvi
- Coordinates: 64°17.8′N 024°26.8′E
- Country: Finland
- Region: North Ostrobothnia
- Sub-region: Ylivieska
- Charter: 1866

Government
  - Municipal manager: Kari Jokela

Area (2018-01-01)
  - Total: 231.63 km^{2} (89.43 sq mi)
  - Land: 229.97 km^{2} (88.79 sq mi)
  - Water: 1.8 km^{2} (0.69 sq mi)
  - Rank: 253rd largest in Finland

Population (2025-12-31)
  - Total: 1,031
  - Rank: 290th largest in Finland
  - Density: 4.48/km^{2} (11.6/sq mi)

Population by native language
  - Finnish: 99.7% (official)
  - Others: 0.3%

Population by age
  - 0 to 14: 24.4%
  - 15 to 64: 51%
  - 65 or older: 24.6%
- Time zone: UTC+02:00 (EET)
  - Summer (DST): UTC+03:00 (EEST)
- Website: www.merijarvi.fi

Merijärvi is a municipality of Finland.

It is located in the Northern Ostrobothnia region. The municipality has a population of 1,031 (31 December 2025) and covers an area of 231.63 square kilometres (89.43 sq mi) of which 1.8 km^{2} (0.69 sq mi) is water. The population density is 4.48 inhabitants per square kilometre (11.6/sq mi).

The municipality is unilingually Finnish.

== Notable people ==
- Juhani Alaranta, an ex-member of parliament
- Erkki Haukipuro, a late member of parliament, minister and governor
- Alvar Saukko, an ex-member of parliament
- Tuomas Myllylä, a cartoon artist
