= Pyhäjoki =

- Municipality
- Pyhäjoen kunta Pyhäjoki kommun
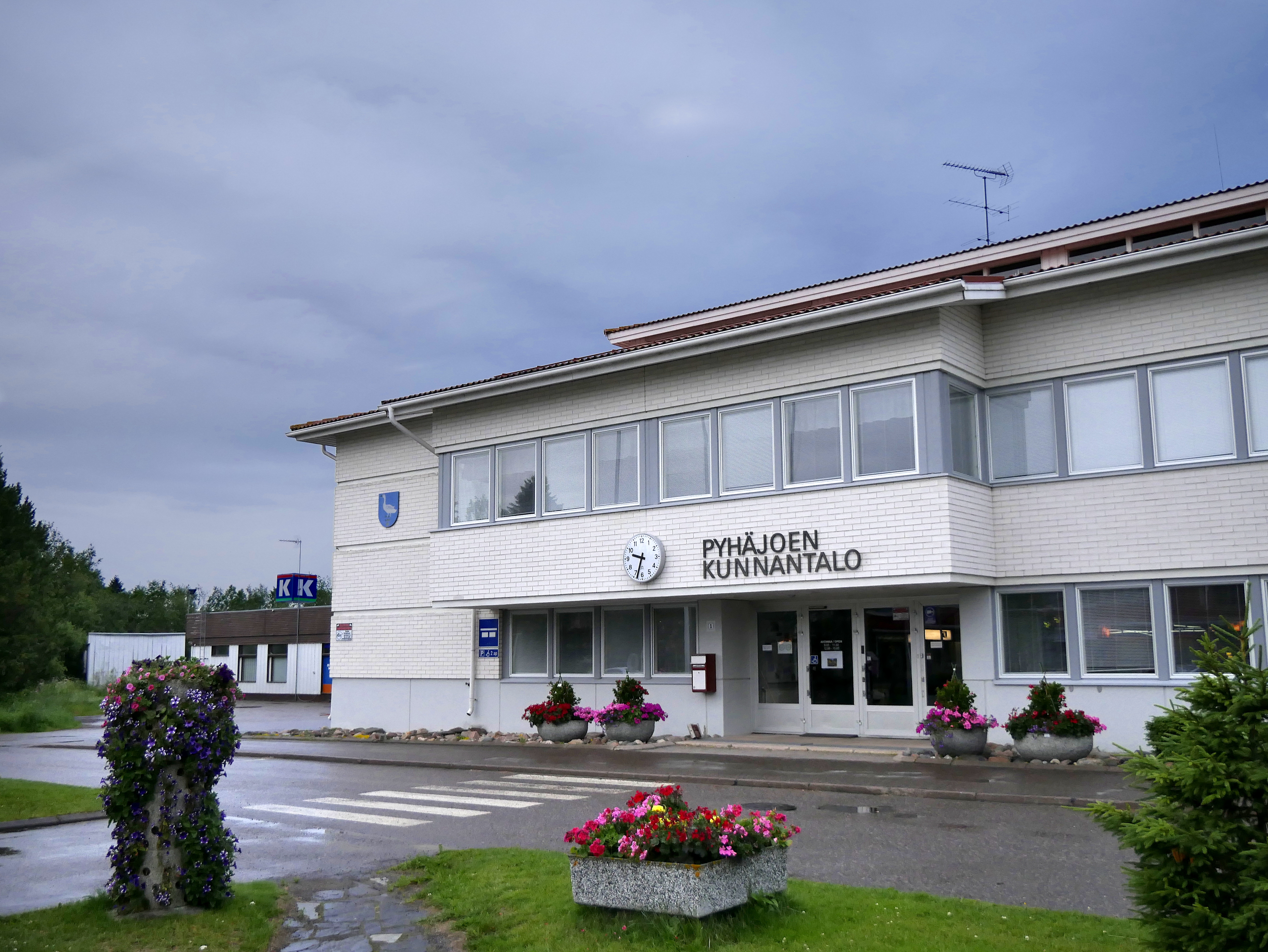
- Pyhäjoki Municipal Hall

- Flag Coat of arms

- Location of Pyhäjoki in Finland
- Interactive map of Pyhäjoki
- Coordinates: 64°27′50″N 24°15′40″E
- Country: Finland
- Region: North Ostrobothnia
- Sub-region: Raahe
- Charter: 1865

Government
  - Municipal manager: Matti Soronen

Area (2018-01-01)
  - Total: 1,365.09 km^{2} (527.06 sq mi)
  - Land: 543.21 km^{2} (209.73 sq mi)
  - Water: 823.25 km^{2} (317.86 sq mi)
  - Rank: 159th largest in Finland

Population (2025-12-31)
  - Total: 2,938
  - Rank: 212th largest in Finland
  - Density: 5.41/km^{2} (14.0/sq mi)

Population by native language
  - Finnish: 96.2% (official)
  - Others: 3.8%

Population by age
  - 0 to 14: 17.4%
  - 15 to 64: 53.4%
  - 65 or older: 29.3%
- Time zone: UTC+02:00 (EET)
  - Summer (DST): UTC+03:00 (EEST)
- Website: www.pyhajoki.fi/en

Pyhäjoki (Finnish pronunciation: [ˈpyhæˌjoki]; lit. 'Holy River') is a municipality of Finland. It is located in the defunct province of Oulu, which was split in two regions; Pyhäjoki is part of the Northern Ostrobothnia region. It is located 102 kilometres (63 mi) southwest of the city of Oulu.

The municipality is located on the Gulf of Bothnia at the mouth of the river Pyhäjoki. It has a population of 2,938 (31 December 2025) and covers an area of 1,365.09 square kilometres (527.06 sq mi) of which 823.25 km^{2} (317.86 sq mi) is water. The population density is 5.41 inhabitants per square kilometre (14.0/sq mi). The municipality is unilingually Finnish.

The subject of the coat of arms of Pyhäjoki refers to the large boulder of Hanhikivi ("Goose Rock") near the mouth of the Pyhäjoki river, which was considered by the Russians at the end of the 15th century as the landmark of the Treaty of Nöteborg from 1323; a crown and cross pattern is carved into the stone as a landmark. The coat of arms was designed by Olof Eriksson and approved by the Pyhäjoki Municipal Council at its meeting on June 18, 1965. The Ministry of the Interior confirmed the use of the coat of arms on September 22 of the same year.

Fennovoima, a Finnish nuclear power company, planned to build a nuclear power plant at Hanhikivi in the municipality, but the project was cancelled in May 2022 because of the Russian invasion of Ukraine, which resulted in Fennovoima terminated its contract with a Russian state corporation Rosatom to build the power plant. In April 2026, it was announced that the Finnish real estate investment company Trevian would purchase a former nuclear power plant site from Fennovoima, and an American nuclear power company Westinghouse Electric Company would then design and build a nuclear power plant on the site.

== See also ==
- Finnish national road 8 (E8) – a highway running through the municipality
- Yppäri – a village in Pyhäjoki
