= North Ostrobothnia =

Region of Finland

North Ostrobothnia Pohjois-Pohjanmaa (Finnish) Norra Österbotten (Swedish)
- Region
- Region of North Ostrobothnia; Pohjois-Pohjanmaan maakunta Landskapet Norra Österbotten
- Coat of arms

- North Ostrobothnia on a map of Finland
- Coordinates: 65°N 026°E
- Country: Finland
- Historical province: Ostrobothnia
- Capital: Oulu
- Other towns: Haapajärvi, Haapavesi, Ii, Kalajoki, Kempele Kuusamo, Nivala, Oulainen, Pudasjärvi, Raahe and Ylivieska

Government
  - Regional Mayor: Jussi Rämet

Area
  - Total: 37,149.23 km^{2} (14,343.40 sq mi)

Population (2023)
  - Total: 418,212
  - Density: 11.2576/km^{2} (29.1571/sq mi)

GDP
  - Total: €12.502 billion (2015)
  - Per capita: €30,779 (2015)
- Time zone: UTC+2 (EET)
  - Summer (DST): UTC+3 (EEST)
- ISO 3166 code: FI-14
- NUTS: 1A2
- Regional song: Kymmenen Virran Maa (The Land of Ten Mighty Streams)
- Regional animal: Stoat (Mustela erminea)
- Regional bird: Common crane (Grus grus)
- Regional fish: Common whitefish (Coregonus lavaretus)
- Regional flower: Marsh Labrador tea (Rhododendron tomentosum)
- Regional rock: Schist
- Regional lake: Lake Pyhäjärvi
- Website: www.pohjois-pohjanmaa.fi

North Ostrobothnia (Finnish: Pohjois-Pohjanmaa; Swedish: Norra Österbotten) is a region of Finland. It borders the Finnish regions of Lapland, Kainuu, North Savo, Central Finland and Central Ostrobothnia, as well as the Russian Republic of Karelia. The easternmost corner of the region between Lapland, Kainuu and the Russian border is known as Koillismaa ("North-East Finland").

== Municipalities ==
The region of North Ostrobothnia consists of 30 municipalities, 11 of which have city status (marked in bold).

=== Map of municipalities ===
Cities and municipalities of North Ostrobothnia.

=== Sub-regions ===
Koillismaa sub-region

- **Kuusamo**
- Taivalkoski

Nivala-Haapajärvi sub-region

- **Haapajärvi**
- Kärsämäki
- **Nivala**
- **Pyhäjärvi**
- Reisjärvi

Oulu sub-region

- Hailuoto (Karlö)
- Kempele
- Liminka (Limingo)
- Lumijoki
- Muhos
- **Oulu** (Uleåborg)
- Tyrnävä

Oulunkaari sub-region

- Ii (Ijo)
- **Pudasjärvi**
- Utajärvi
- Vaala

Raahe sub-region

- Pyhäjoki
- **Raahe** (Brahestad)
- Siikajoki

Siikalatva sub-region

- **Haapavesi**
- Pyhäntä
- Siikalatva

Ylivieska sub-region

- Alavieska
- **Kalajoki**
- Merijärvi
- **Oulainen**
- Sievi
- **Ylivieska**

=== List of municipalities ===
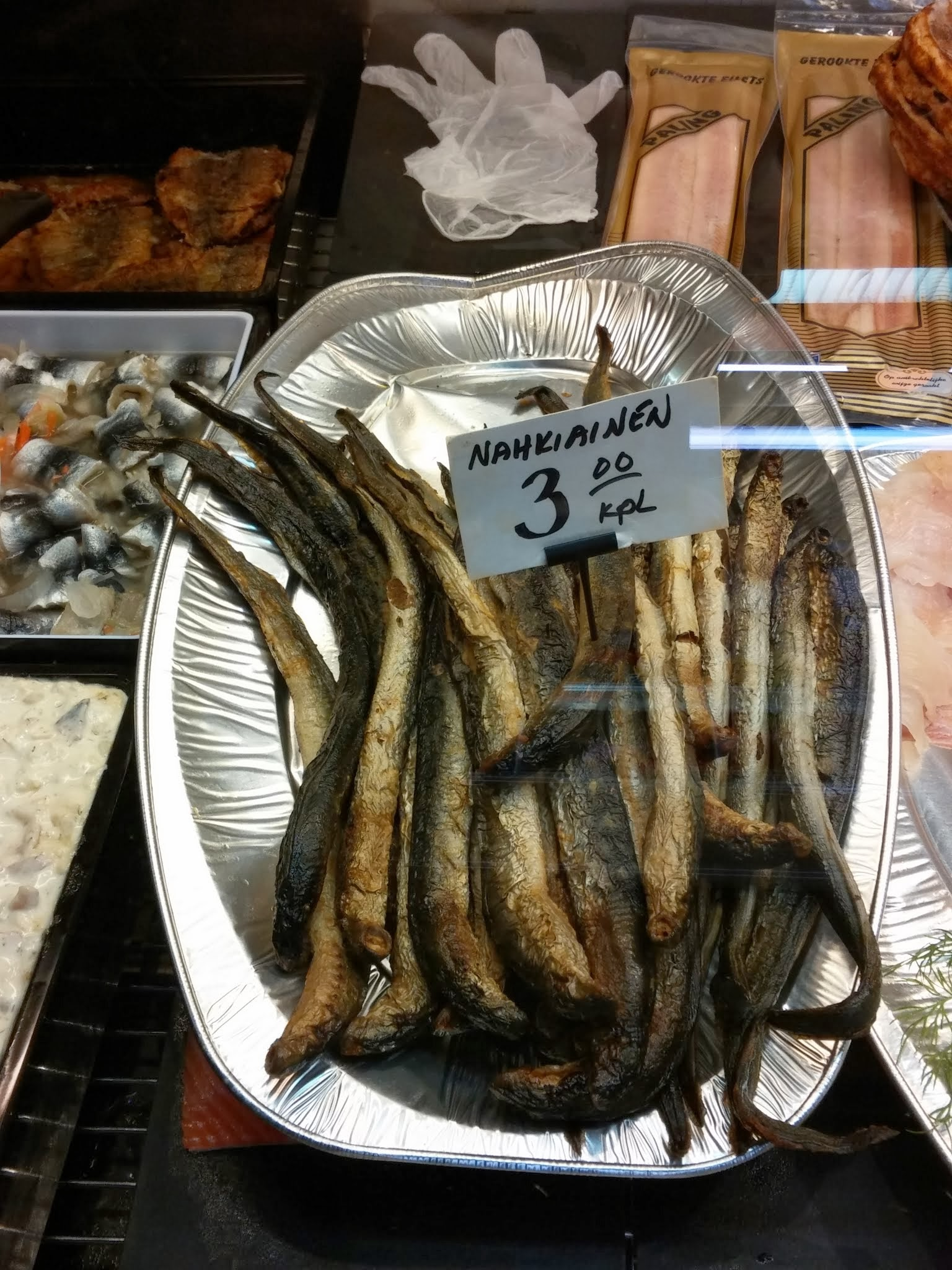
Lampreys

Coat of arms	Municipality	Population	Land area (km^{2})	Density (/km^{2})	Finnish speakers	Swedish speakers	Other speakers
Coat of arms of Alavieska	Alavieska	2,384	252	9	98 %	0 %	2 %
coat of arms of Haapajärvi	Haapajärvi	6,441	766	8	98 %	0 %	2 %
Coat of arms of Haapavesi	Haapavesi	6,298	1,050	6	96 %	0 %	4 %
Coat of arms of Hailuoto	Hailuoto	912	206	4	98 %	0 %	2 %
coat of arms of Ii	Ii	9,755	1,616	6	99 %	0.2 %	1 %
Coat of arms of Kalajoki	Kalajoki	12,155	924	13	96 %	0.4 %	4 %
Coat of arms of Kempele	Kempele	19,702	110	179	98 %	0.1 %	2 %
Coat of arms of Kuusamo	Kuusamo	14,800	4,979	3	95 %	0.3 %	5 %
Coat of arms of Kärsämäki	Kärsämäki	2,324	697	3	98 %	0 %	2 %
coat of arms of Liminka	Liminka	10,116	637	16	99 %	0.1 %	1 %
Coat of arms of Lumijoki	Lumijoki	2,018	214	9	96 %	0 %	4 %
Coat of arms of Merijärvi	Merijärvi	1,031	230	4	99 %	0 %	0 %
Coat of arms of Muhos	Muhos	8,767	785	11	98 %	0 %	2 %
Coat of arms of Nivala	Nivala	10,300	527	20	98 %	0 %	2 %
Coat of arms of Oulainen	Oulainen	6,832	588	12	97 %	0 %	3 %
coat of arms of Oulu	Oulu	217,469	2,972	73	93 %	0.2 %	7 %
Coat of arms of Pudasjärvi	Pudasjärvi	7,168	5,639	1	98 %	0.2 %	2 %
Coat of arms of Pyhäjoki	Pyhäjoki	2,938	543	5	96 %	0 %	4 %
coat of arms of Pyhäjärvi	Pyhäjärvi	4,551	1,310	3	97 %	0 %	3 %
Coat of arms of Pyhäntä	Pyhäntä	1,678	810	2	89 %	0 %	11 %
Coat of arms of Raahe	Raahe	23,413	1,014	23	95 %	0.1 %	5 %
Coat of arms of Reisjärvi	Reisjärvi	2,476	474	5	99 %	0 %	1 %
Coat of arms of Sievi	Sievi	4,585	786	6	94 %	0.2 %	6 %
coat of arms of Siikajoki	Siikajoki	4,723	1,055	4	98 %	0 %	2 %
Coat of arms of Siikalatva	Siikalatva	4,861	2,173	2	98 %	0 %	2 %
Coat of arms of Taivalkoski	Taivalkoski	3,555	2,438	1	97 %	0 %	3 %
Coat of arms of Tyrnävä	Tyrnävä	6,470	492	13	99 %	0.2 %	1 %
Coat of arms of Utajärvi	Utajärvi	2,399	1,669	1	98 %	0 %	2 %
Coat of arms of Vaala	Vaala	2,544	1,302	2	98 %	0 %	2 %
Coat of arms of Ylivieska	Ylivieska	15,274	570	27	97 %	0.2 %	3 %
	Total	417,939	36,830	11	95 %	0.2 %	5 %

== Demographics ==
Population size 1990–2025
Year	Population
1990	350,799
1995	364,443
2000	372,639
2005	384,808
2010	398,335
2015	410,054
2020	413,830
2025	417,939

== Politics ==
For parliamentary elections, the regions of North Ostrobothnia and Kainuu form the Oulu constituency. As of 2023, the constituency elects 18 of the 200 members of the Parliament of Finland.
