= Oskari Vuorivirta =

Finnish Lutheran pastor and politician (1861–1923)

Oskar (Oskari) Herman Vuorivirta (15 January 1861 – 22 December 1923; surname until 1906 Bergström) was a Finnish Lutheran pastor and politician, born in Sotkamo. He was a member of the Parliament of Finland from 1910 to 1911, representing the Finnish Party.
