= Hiukka Stadium =

Pesäpallo stadium in Sotkamo, Finland

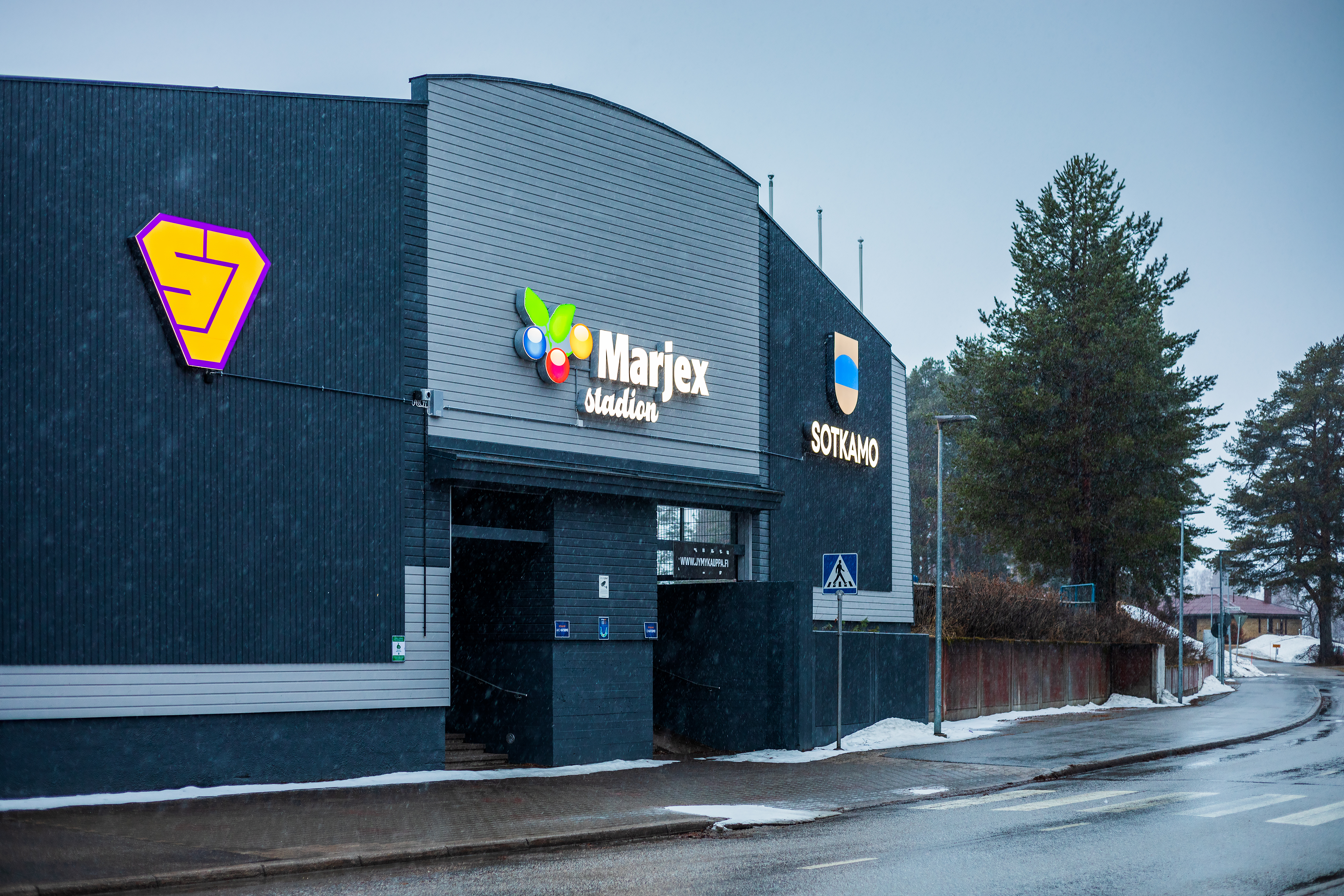
- Hiukka Stadium at 2023.

- Location within Finland Location within Europe
- Address: Urheilukatu; 88600 Sotkamo; Finland
- Location: Sotkamo, Finland
- Coordinates: 64.129788°N 28.381248°E
- Owner: Municipality of Sotkamo
- Capacity: 4,500
- Surface: Artificial grass with clay Barren soil (Outer right field)
- Record attendance: 6,987; June 28, 1998 (All-Star Game)
- Field size: Centre field: 126 m (413 ft); Right field: 88 m (289 ft)

Construction
- Opened: 1946
- Renovated: 2022

Tenant
- Sotkamon Jymy (1946–present)

Hiukka Stadium (Finnish: Hiukan pesäpallostadion), known as Terrafame Stadium for sponsorship reasons, is a pesäpallo stadium located in Sotkamo, Finland. Since its opening in 1946, it has been the home field of the Sotkamon Jymy, a Superpesis team.

The Hiukka Stadium is located in the centre of Sotkamo, right on the shore of Sapsojärvi. The former athletics field has been used almost exclusively as a pesäpallo haven since the mid-1990s. The field is known for its purple artificial grass and Hiukka's beach, where the ball can be thrown by mistake.
