= Advent International =

Global private equity firm

Advent International Corporation

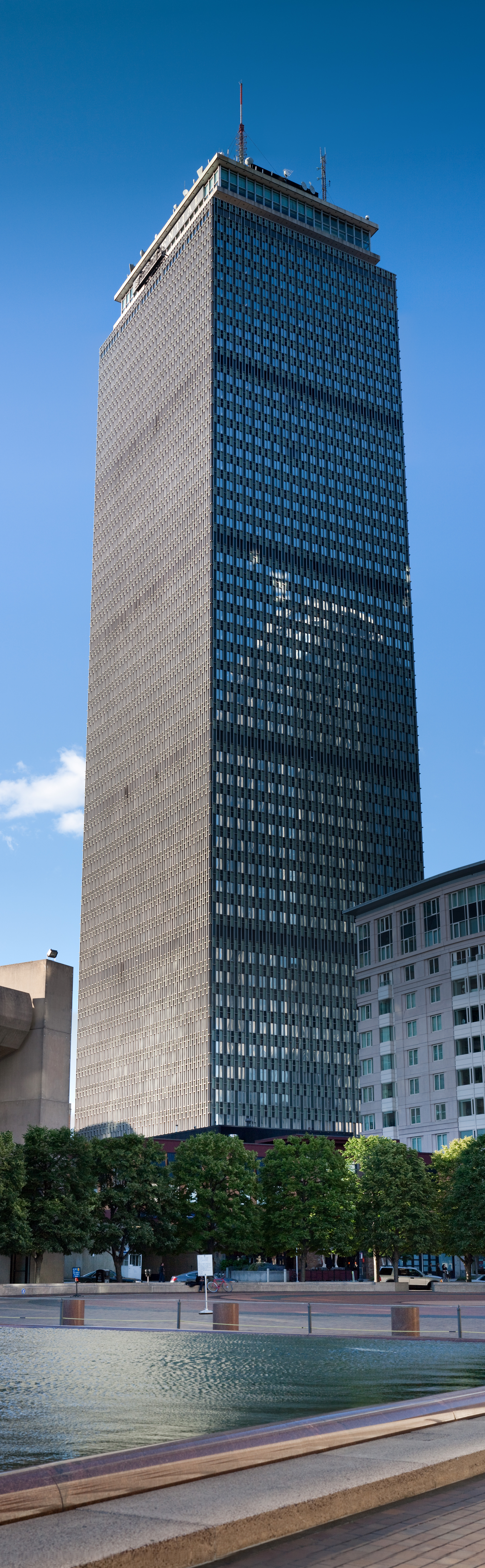
- Headquarters at Prudential Tower
- Type: Private
- Industry: Private equity
- Founded: 1984; 42 years ago
- Founder: Peter Brooke
- Headquarters: Boston, Massachusetts
- Products: Private equity funds Buyouts
- AUM: ~$100 billion (2025)
- Number of employees: ~475
- Website: adventinternational.com

Advent International Corporation is an American private equity firm. It specializes in buyouts of companies based in Europe, North America, Latin America, and Asia. The firm had approximately $100 billion in assets under management as of November 2025.

Since its founding in 1984, Advent has spent over $56 billion in obtaining private equity capital. Through its buyout programs that purchase companies in their entirety for hard cash, it has completed more than 375 transactions in 42 countries.

The firm operates out of 14 offices in 11 countries and employs over 240 investment professionals. In 2025, it ranked 16th among the world's largest private equity firms in Private Equity International's PEI 300 rankings.

== History ==
Advent is a Boston, Massachusetts, spin-out from TA Associates by Peter Brooke. Brooke had founded TA Associates in 1968, after having expanded the venture capital operations of TA's parent Tucker Anthony & R.L. Day. In 1985, Advent raised its first fund – a $14 million corporate venture capital program for Nabisco. In 1987, the firm raised the $225 million International Network Fund, its first institutional private equity fund. The firm raised its first European fund in 1989, with the $231 million European Special Situations Fund and opened its London office.

Advent continued its expansion in the 1990s, opening offices in Frankfurt and Milan and merging with UK-based Trinity Capital Partners. In 1994, Advent completed fundraising for the first of its flagship series of funds, Advent Global Private Equity (GPE) II, with $415 million. In 1996, Advent expanded into Latin America raising a dedicated Advent Latin American Private Equity Fund and opening offices in Buenos Aires, Mexico City, and São Paulo.

Advent crossed the billion dollar mark in 1997, with the raising of the $1.2 billion Advent Global Private Equity (GPE) III, and in the last few years of the 1990s, Advent raised additional sector funds focused on media and communications as well as healthcare and life sciences. Advent's founder, Peter Brooke, stepped down as the firm's CEO in 1996, but remained active as the company's chairman.

Through the 2000s, Advent's expansion accelerated as the firm raised additional funds for its various fund families and opening new offices in Europe and Asia. Advent's sixth global private equity fund, raised in 2008, closed with €6.6 billion of investor commitments and the firm raised an additional €1 billion for investments in central Europe.

In April 2010, Advent created a $1.65 billion buyout fund to invest in Latin America. It was the largest private equity fund in Latin America ever.

In March 2016, Advent raised its eighth global private equity fund with $13 billion of investor commitments.

== Investments ==
Advent began to invest in Poland in 1995. In total, the firm has made 13 investments in Poland across multiple sectors, including construction materials, food and beverages, financial services, rail equipment, construction chemicals, and the cable industry.

Advent acquired the British variety store chain Poundland in 2002, and has investments in the Fat Face clothing brand and extended warranty firm Domestic & General.

In 2004, Advent-owned fund Viva Ventures bought the Bulgarian state-owned telecoms monopoly Bulgarian Telecommunications Company. The company was sold to AIG in 2007.

In 2005, founder of lululemon athletica Chip Wilson partnered with Advent and Highland Capital Partners to sell a 48% minority stake in lululemon athletica.

Advent bought a majority ownership of Bradco Supply, a leading distributor of building products, in 2008.

The firm has acquired a number of companies in Central and Eastern Europe through its dedicated regional funds. These include Romanian Ceramica IASI, one of Romania’s leading ceramic bricks and clay roof tiles producers, Bolix, a leading Polish producer of construction chemicals, Dufa Deutek, Romania’s largest decorative paints producer, and LaborMed Pharma, which manufactures and distributes generic pharmaceuticals primarily for cardiovascular and central nervous system ailments.

In 2007, its Asia affiliate Seavi Advent led the restructuring of Yangzijiang Shipbuilding, one of China's largest privately owned shipbuilders, and successfully listed the company on the Singapore Exchange, making it one of the largest IPOs by a foreign company in Singapore.

In March 2009, Advent announced the acquisition of a controlling interest in Fifth Third Processing Solutions, the payment processing business of Fifth Third Bank in a $2.35 billion transaction. The transaction represented one of the largest private equity transactions completed in 2009, amidst the 2008 financial crisis. The deal was completed in June 2009.

In November 2009, the firm announced a public tender offer to acquire 100% of Wydawnictwa Szkolne i Pedagogiczne S.A. (WSiP), the largest Polish educational publisher.

In April 2010, Advent took over retailer DFS in the United Kingdom. In August 2010, Advent International was credited with spawning the takeover of Mexicana Airlines by an outside investor group, Advent International has no equity investment stakes in the takeover according to published sources. The next month, Advent sold Poundland to Warburg Pincus for £200 million.

In 2010, Advent and Goldman Sachs Alternatives acquired Transunion from Madison Dearborn Partners and the Pritzker family.

In 2011, the firm acquired Mondo Minerals, the second largest global talc producer and British mental health care provider, Priory Group, best known for providing mental health treatments to celebrities such as Eric Clapton and Johnny Depp.

In August 2011, Advent acquired Bojangles' Famous Chicken 'n Biscuits, a regional chain of quick-service restaurants based in Charlotte, North Carolina.

In October 2013, Advent reached agreement with Vista Equity Partners to acquire P2 Energy Solutions.

On August 7, 2014, lululemon athletica and Wilson facilitated Advent's re-engagement in lululemon by selling 13.85% ownership in the company to Advent for approximately $845 million. The transaction received the full support of the lululemon Board of Directors and changes the board dynamic. Advent Managing Partner David M. Mussafer and Managing Director Steven J. Collins will be appointed to lululemon's Board of Directors, expanding the Board from 10 to 12 members. Mr. Mussafer will now share Chairman responsibilities with Michael Casey. Lululemon will also engage an independent expert to evaluate and make recommendations regarding the lululemon Board's committees, policies and procedures over the course of 90 days following the completion of Advent's stock purchase.

In November 2014, Advent completed a new $2.1 billion private equity fund, its Advent Latin American Private Equity Fund VI, thought to be the largest ever raised for Latin America. Advent International also acquired a significant minority ownership of Noosa Yoghurt, a Bellevue-based company, for an undisclosed amount.

Between 2016 and 2018, the firm acquired business-to-business distributors of industrial supplies Brammer and IPH Group to create Rubix.

In February 2017, it announced that it would partner with CCC Information Services as their sole equity partner, buying out Leonard Green & Partners and TPG Capital.

On May 31, 2017, Advent and Bpifrance completed the acquisition of Safran Identity & Security (Morpho, now renamed IDEMIA), after receiving clearance from antitrust and regulatory authorities. " Didier Lamouche was appointed President of the Executive Board and Marwan Lahoud Chairman of the Supervisory Board of OT-MORPHO. This acquisition raised a series of concerns:

- Various civil rights organizations have criticized the government's contracts with IDEMIA, expressing concerns about sharing sensitive biometric data with a private and unregulated third-party company.
- Researchers have also found that facial verification and identification algorithms, including IDEMIA's algorithm specifically, exhibit systematic racial and gender bias.
- Another concern is the presence of Marwan Lahoud as a President or member of the board of different entities of the group, since 2017.
- Marwan Lahoud abruptly left Airbus (former EADS) in February 2017, without notice, and is deeply involved in the scandal of corruption which hit Airbus. "Airbus ran 'massive' bribery scheme to win orders" (title of the article in the Financial Times of January 31, 2020 in which he is mentioned, with a photo of him with this title: "Marwan Lahoud, who led the strategy organization and marketing of Airbus, SMO, a division dedicated to securing sales in emerging markets and at the heart of a catalog of offenses."). In January 2020, the French press announced that the French, British and American courts had validated the agreements made earlier this week by Airbus and the French National Financial Prosecutor's Office (PNF), the British Serious Fraud Office (SFO) and the Department of Justice ( DOJ) in the United States, under which the European group AIRBUS recognises the fraud and briberies, and undertakes to pay fines totalling 3.6 billion euros: 2.08 billion in France as part of a public interest legal agreement (CJIP ), 984 million in the United Kingdom and 526 million in the United States.
  Today dissolved, the group's unit called Strategy and Marketing Organization (SMO), led by Marwan Lahoud, was at the heart of the matter.
  Almost all the articles published on these agreements underline that the ex-leaders may be worried within the framework of a preliminary investigation still in progress.

In October 2018, Advent acquired pharmaceutical company Zentiva, previously owned by Sanofi.

On December 20, 2019, the UK government approved Advent's £4 billion takeover of defense supplier Cobham Plc. On July 24, 2019, the firm announced the 165p in cash for each Cobham shares, takeover of the firm. On September 16, 2019, at a shareholders' meeting in London, the proposed takeover deal was approved with 93% voting in favor of the deal, surpassing the requisite 75% votes. The takeover was controversial, with opponents of the deal, such as the former First Sea Lord and Royal Navy chief Admiral Lord West of Spithead expressing fears. The founding family of Cobham were also vocal opponents of the takeover. These oppositions for the takeover triggered an investigation by the Competition & Markets Authority, on the national security implications of the transaction, which led to the delay in the regulatory approval of the deal.

The company is following up its $3.3 billion acquisition of Evonik Industries's plastics division.

In July 2020, with Cinven, Advent completed the acquisition of thyssenkrupp’s elevator technology business.

On March 5, 2021, the firm completed the acquisition of Global Connect business (NielsenIQ, the former ACNielsen) of Nielsen Holdings.

Advent purchased a large stake in Indian pharmaceutical company Suven Pharmaceuticals for about 973.5 billion won and acquired 50.1%. It announced that it has established global leadership worth about 1.2755 trillion won through efficient production lines and expansion of development scale.

On December 16, 2022, the geospatial intelligence company Maxar Technologies announced it had been acquired by Advent International for $6.4 billion.

In October 2023, Advent acquired Baxter's Biopharmaceutical Solutions business with Warburg Pincus.

In December 2024, the firm acquired a majority stake in Ciessin Corp., Colombia's largest independent ERP provider, from Ciessin Holdings and former Ciessa employees.

In January 2025, Advent announced that it had entered into a definitive agreement to acquire Sauer Brands Inc., an expanded platform for major condiment and condiment brands, from Falfuryas Capital Partners. Also in January, Advent and an outside partner completed a $3B minority investment in Fisher Investments.

In August 2025, Advent agreed to buy Swiss semiconductor company U-blox for $1.3 billion.

In February 2026, the firm acquired Bulgaria-based TBI Bank, expanding its presence in Southeastern Europe.

In July 2026, it was reported that Advent and Stripe had made a joint offer to acquire PayPal.

== Investment funds ==
Fund	Vintage Year	Capital ($m)
Advent Global Private Equity (GPE) VII	2012	$10,800
Advent Latin American Private Equity Fund VI	2014	$2,100
Advent Global Private Equity (GPE) VIII	2016	$13,000
Advent Global Technology	2019	$2,000
Advent Global Private Equity (GPE) IX	2019	$17,500
Advent Latin American Private Equity Fund VII	2020	$2,000
Advent Global Technology II	2021	$4,000
Advent Global Private Equity (GPE) X	2022	$25,000
