= Seavi Advent =

Private equity and venture capital firm in Southeast Asia

SEAVI Advent Private Equity
- Type: Private Ownership
- Industry: Private Equity
- Founded: 1984
- Headquarters: Singapore
- Products: Private equity funds
- Total assets: $800 million

SEAVI Advent Private Equity is the first private equity and venture capital firm in Southeast Asia. Since its founding in 1984 by Peter Brooke, the firm has invested over US$800 million into more than 120 companies in Southeast Asia and Greater China. SEAVI Advent operates from three offices in Asia and is the independent Asian affiliate of Advent International, with an established long-term strategic partnership with Advent International in Southeast Asia and the Greater China region.

Since 1996, SEAVI Advent has a strong presence and substantial investments in Southeast Asia and Greater China. Previous investments include Venture Manufacturing Singapore (now called Venture Corporation Ltd), Yangzijiang Shipbuilding, the buyout of Inchcape Marketing Services Limited, Sinofriends (also known as ZhenAi Wang) and Weimob.

== History ==
SEAVI Advent began operations in December 1983 under the then name of Southeast Asia Venture Investment Company or SEAVIC for short, with a mandate to invest in venture capital deals in the Southeast Asia region. It was founder by Peter Brooke, who had also founded TA Associates and Advent International, and was managed by Tan Keng Boon, Derrick Lee and Koh Lee Boon. SEAVIC was launched with the international sponsorship of TA Associates, Orange Nassau and the International Finance Corporation together with the regional sponsorship of National Iron and Steel Mills of Singapore, DBS Bank, and the Arab-Malaysian Bank of Malaysia, amongst others.

SEAVIC initially managed three separate funds in 1983 - Venture Investment Singapore fund focusing on Singapore, SEAVI fund focusing on Singapore and other ASEAN countries, and Malaysian Ventures Sdn. Bhd. focusing on Malaysia. It later expanded to managing other country specific funds such as SEAVI Thailand and SEAVI Indonesia.

In 1996, SEAVIC was fully acquired by Advent International and shifted its focus to larger, later-stage deals where it could take a controlling interest in companies that were benefiting from the rapid economic growth in Southeast Asia.

In 2002, SEAVIC was spun back out to affiliate status under the name SEAVI Advent and was managed by Tan Keng Boon and Derrick Lee, its two founding managing partners.

According to Preqin, SEAVI Advent Equity IV, SEAVI Advent's fourth fund is ranked fourth in the top-performing ASEAN-based private equity funds of all vintages, with a net IRR of 29.9%.

Since then, SEAVI Advent is managing its seventh fund, focusing on growth stage investments and pre-IPO and middle market buyouts in China, Hong Kong, Singapore, Malaysia, Indonesia and other Southeast Asian markets.

SEAVI Advent is headquartered in Singapore with offices in Hong Kong and Shanghai.

== Investments ==
As of 2025, SEAVI Advent has taken more than 50 portfolio companies public on seven Asian stock exchanges, including Singapore, Malaysia, Hong Kong, Indonesia, Thailand and Mainland China, as well as both the New York Stock Exchange and NASDAQ.

Previous investments include venture capital investments, significant minority equity investments, minority or majority recapitalizations, mezzanine financing, leveraged buyouts and management buyouts. SEAVI Advent invests in a large range of sectors, including but not limited to enterprise technology & services, advanced manufacturing, technology, healthcare, consumer and logistics.

SEAVIC's first investment was that of Venture Manufacturing Singapore (VMS) which if first founded in 1984 and invested US$1.7 million. As part of VMS' restructuring, SEAVIC brought in a new management team before subsequently listing the company on Singapore's SESDAQ in 1992.

Together with Advent International, SEAVI Advent was one of the investors that teamed-up with Li & Fung Ltd, one of Asia's most successful trading and logistics companies, as part of a leveraged buyout of Inchcape Plc's Asia Pacific marketing, distributing and warehouse businesses for US$220 million. It helped list the company on the Hong Kong Stock Exchange in 2004.

In 2006, SEAVI Advent led the restructuring of Yangzijiang Shipbuilding, one of China's largest privately owned shipbuilders, and successfully listed the company on the Singapore Exchange. This project was one of the largest IPOs by a foreign company in Singapore then.

In 2018, SEAVI Advent invested US$25 million in Chinese software developer and social advertising service provider Weimob, and listed the company on the Hong Kong Stock Exchange. SEAVI Advent focuses on investing in later-stage growth companies in more high-tech and service-related businesses.
