= Sotkamon Jymy =

Finnish sports club

- Logo

Information
- League: Superpesis
- Location: Sotkamo, Finland
- Ballpark: Hiukka Stadium
- Founded: 1909
- Colors: purple, orange
- Ownership: SuperJymy Oy
- Manager: Iiro Haimi
- Website: www.superjymy.fi

Current uniforms
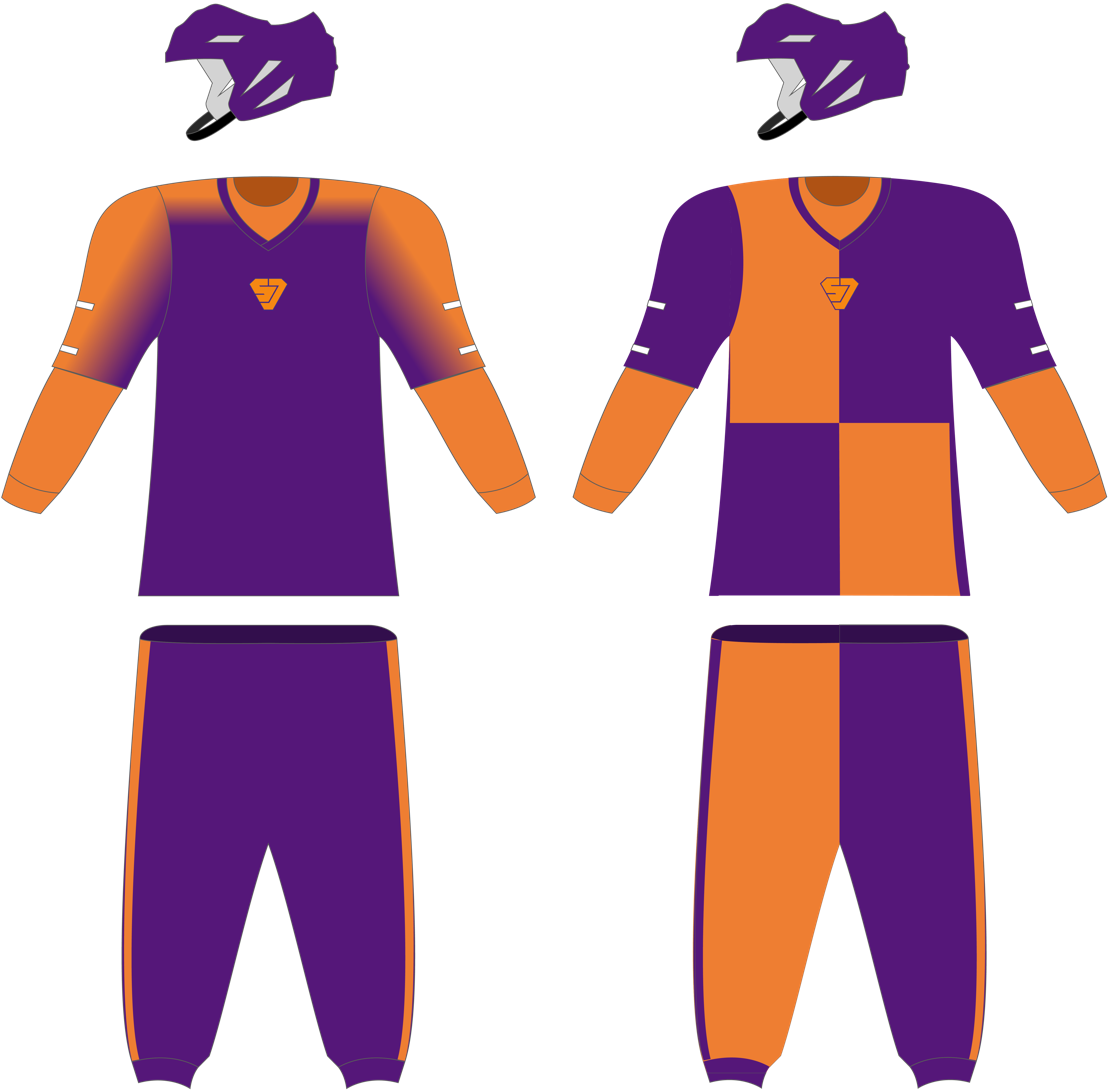

Sotkamon Jymy (lit. "Huge of Sotkamo"; or simply Jymy) is a Finnish professional pesäpallo team from Sotkamo. It was founded in 1909. Sotkamon Jymy is playing in the top-tier Superpesis. Sotkamon Jymy has participated in many sports in Finland over the years, such as athletics and orienteering. Since 1990s, the club's main successes have been in pesäpallo.

Sotkamon Jymy won the men's Finnish Pesäpallo Championship (Superpesis) 20 times in years 1963, 1990, 1992–1993, 1995–1997, 2001–2003, 2005–2006, 2009, 2011–2015, 2020 and 2023-2024. The home ground of Sotkamon Jymy is the Hiukka Stadium. Its well-known competitor is Vimpelin Veto from Vimpeli, known as long-time rival of Sotkamon Jymy.

== History ==
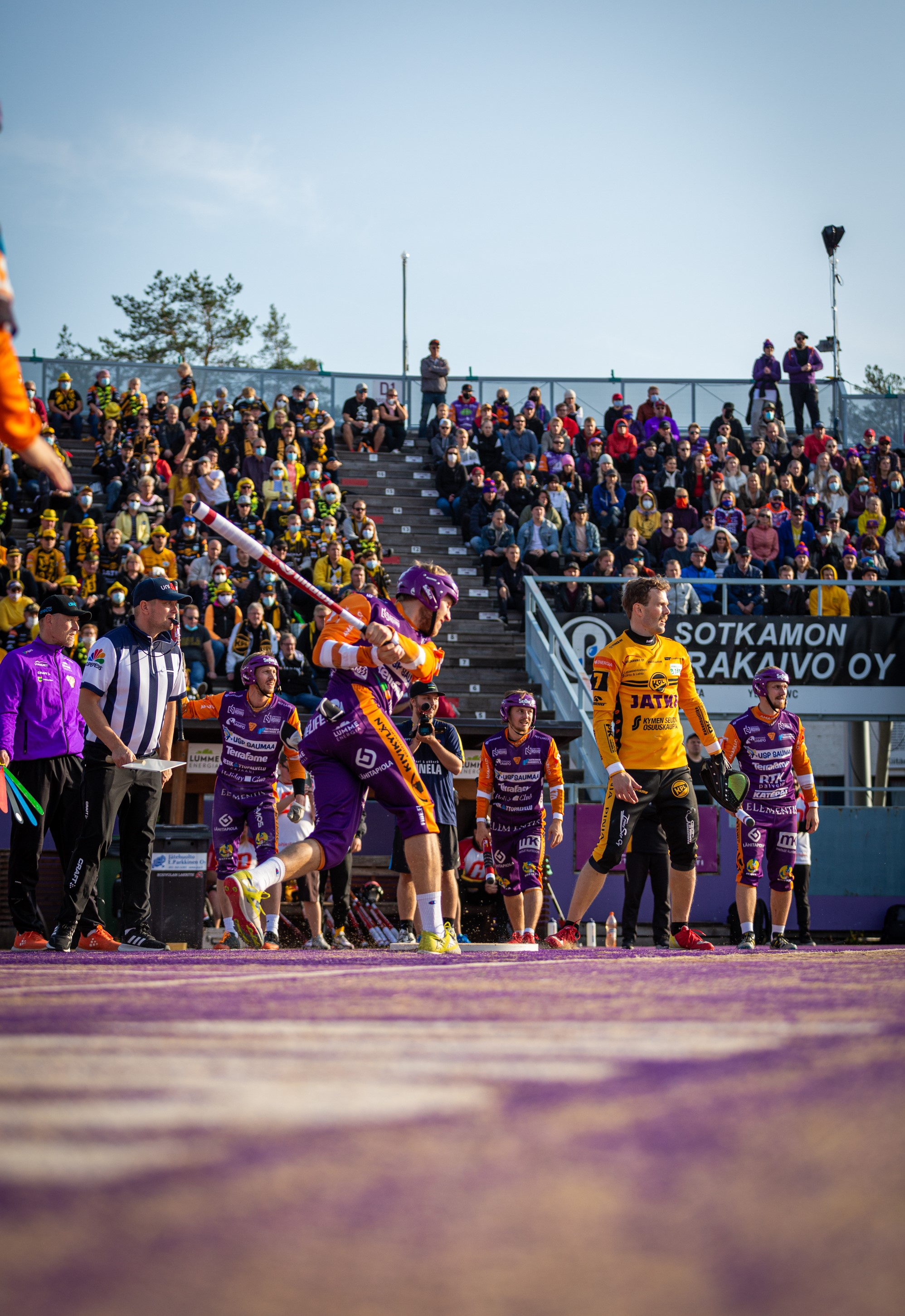
Sotkamon Jymy at 2020.

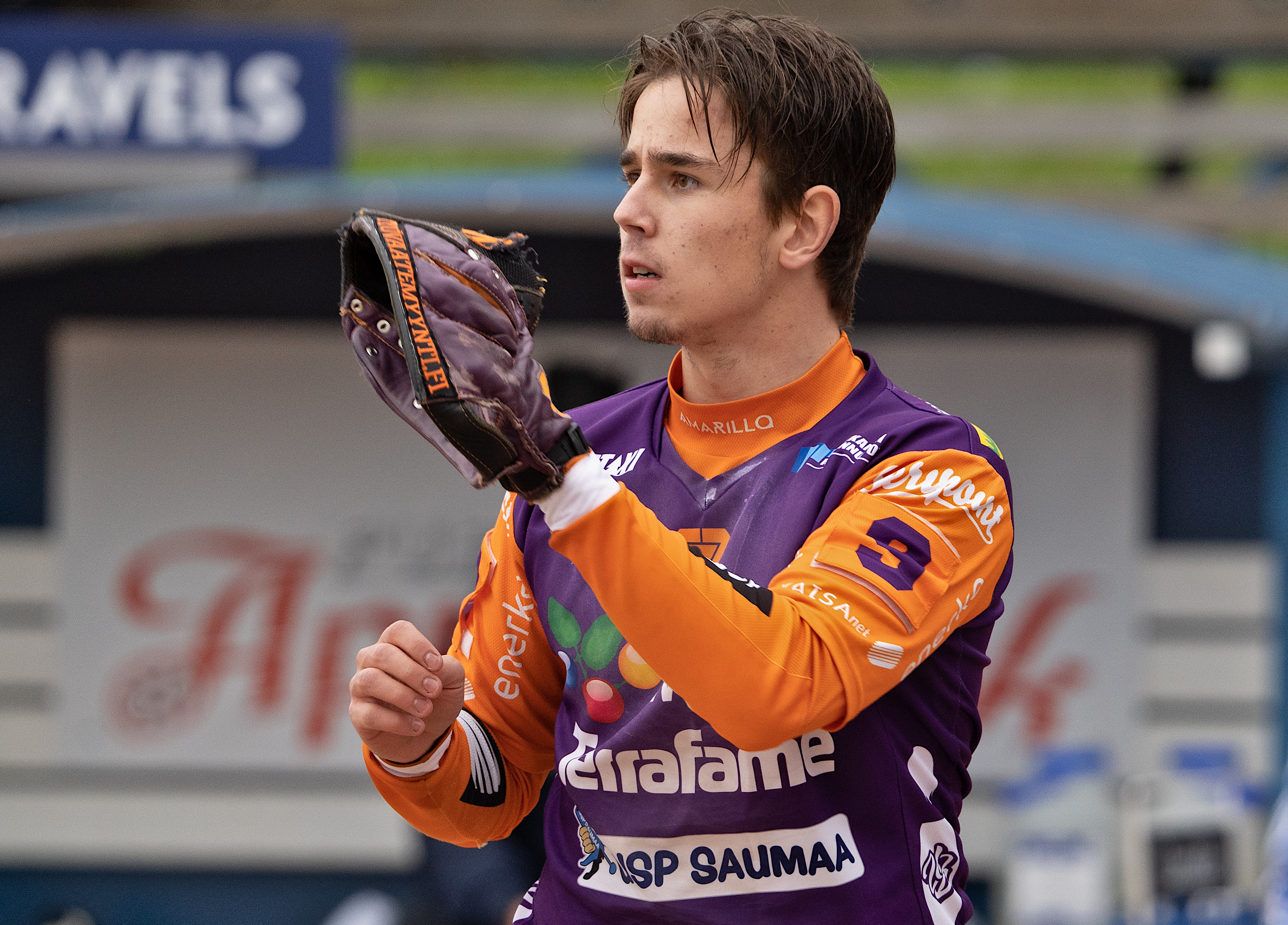
Sotkamon Jymy player Aapo Komulainen at 2021.

Sotkamon Jymy was founded in 1909 as a general sports club. Pesäpallo started to be played in the Vuokatinvaara area as early as the 1920s, but the real revival came in the 1950s.

Pesäpallo quickly became a municipal sport in Sotkamo and the fields and courtyards were filled with little boys and girls playing pesäpallo from morning till night. This development was supported by the 'sports schools' organised by the municipality of Sotkamo in the summer, where baseball was the only ball game. During the summer, the juniors played baseball first at the 'sports school', then at the club's training sessions and at all other times on their own time.

Pesäpallo used to be played in many villages in Sotkamo, and as the villages began to empty out, the tradition of playing in the villages was smoothly transformed into a recreational game.

Jymy won its first Finnish championship almost entirely with a local team in 1963. In sporting terms, that championship remained a one-off. Jymy was promoted to the SM series in the autumn of 1962, won the championship in 1963, was relegated to the Suomensarja in 1964, was promoted again in 1965 and relegated again in 1966, after which it had to dive.

The 1970s in particular were a challenging time for Jymy. It had to fight for its survival against village clubs like Sumsan Suju and Tipasojan Isku - and once even came close to dropping into the provincial league.

=== Rise to the Greatness ===
A new boom began in the 1980s. Jymy returned to the Championship League in 1984 and a pesäpallo boom was quickly born in Sotkamo, fuelled by the cramped and raucous atmosphere of the old stands.

Underneath the surface, however, there was a real explosion. In the 1980s, young manager Juha Tanskanen took over the talented age group of Janne Vuorinen, Kari Hakkarainen and Sami Sirviö in junior baseball and turned them into the most celebrated top-flight team in the history of baseball. Jymy won its first championship under Aulis Väisänen in 1990, but the real reign began when Tanskanen returned from the Pesäpallo Association back to Sotkamo and became Jymy's manager in 1992.

Tanskanen led both the sporting side and the club organisation. Between 1992 and 1997 he won four Finnish championships as manager. In addition, he built a completely superior club organisation. Since 1999, Tanskanen has worked mainly in the club's organisation.

In the early 2000s, a second wave of championships began. The 2010s wave brought five championships in a row, but since the 2015 championship, Sotkamo has celebrated only two championships in eight seasons, in autumn 2020 and 2023.

== Culture ==
Jymy has been impactful as a club organization, and influencing Finnish sport as a whole. It has been influential in marketing, networking, values, building cooperation agreements and, in general, how a sports club can become a community partner and influencer. In the 1990s, Jymy was at its best, together with Jokerit, a well known sports club in Finland.

== Pesäpallo High School and Vuokatti Sports Academy ==
Sotkamo Jymy's story is closely linked to the Sotkamo Pesäpallo High School and Vuokatti Sports Academy. The club's teams have been built mainly on its own juniors, and there have been few players from outside the club. Most of those who have come from elsewhere have come to Sotkamo specifically to play at the pesäpallo high school.

== Achievements ==
Men's Pesäpallo

Superpesis

Type	Trophy	Titles	Seasons
Finnish championship	Winners	20	1963, 1990, 1992, 1993, 1995, 1996, 1997, 2001, 2002, 2003, 2005, 2006, 2009, 2011, 2012, 2013, 2014, 2015, 2020, 2023, 2024
Finnish championship	Second place	8	1991, 2000, 2007, 2008, 2016, 2017, 2019, 2025, 2026
Finnish championship	Third place	3	1994, 2005, 2010
