= Kajaaninjoki =

River in the country of Finland

Coordinates: 64°13′52″N 027°43′10″E

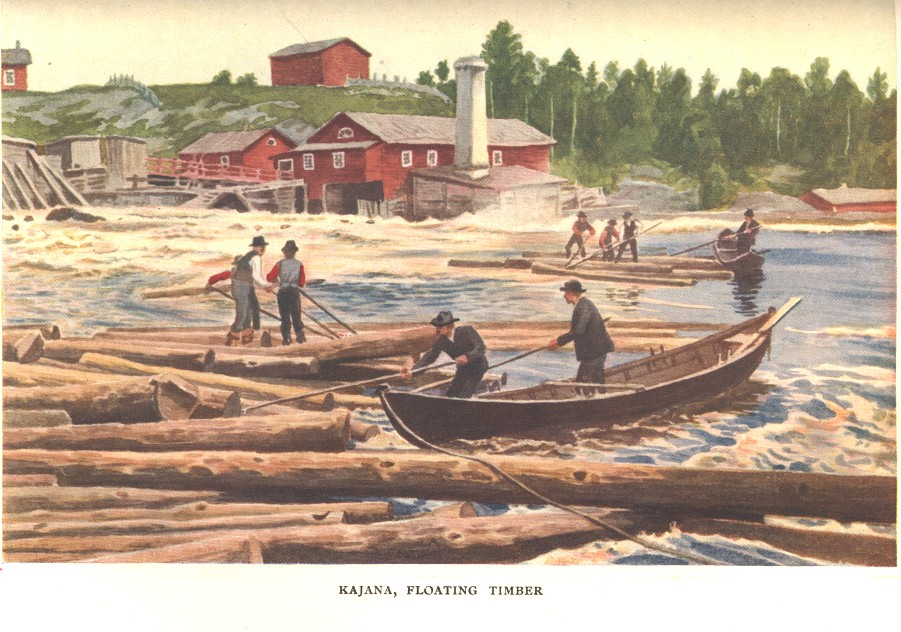
- Timber floating in the Ämmäkoski rapids

Location
- Country: Finland

Physical characteristics
- Source
  - location: Lake Nuasjärvi
- Mouth
  - location: Lake Oulujärvi

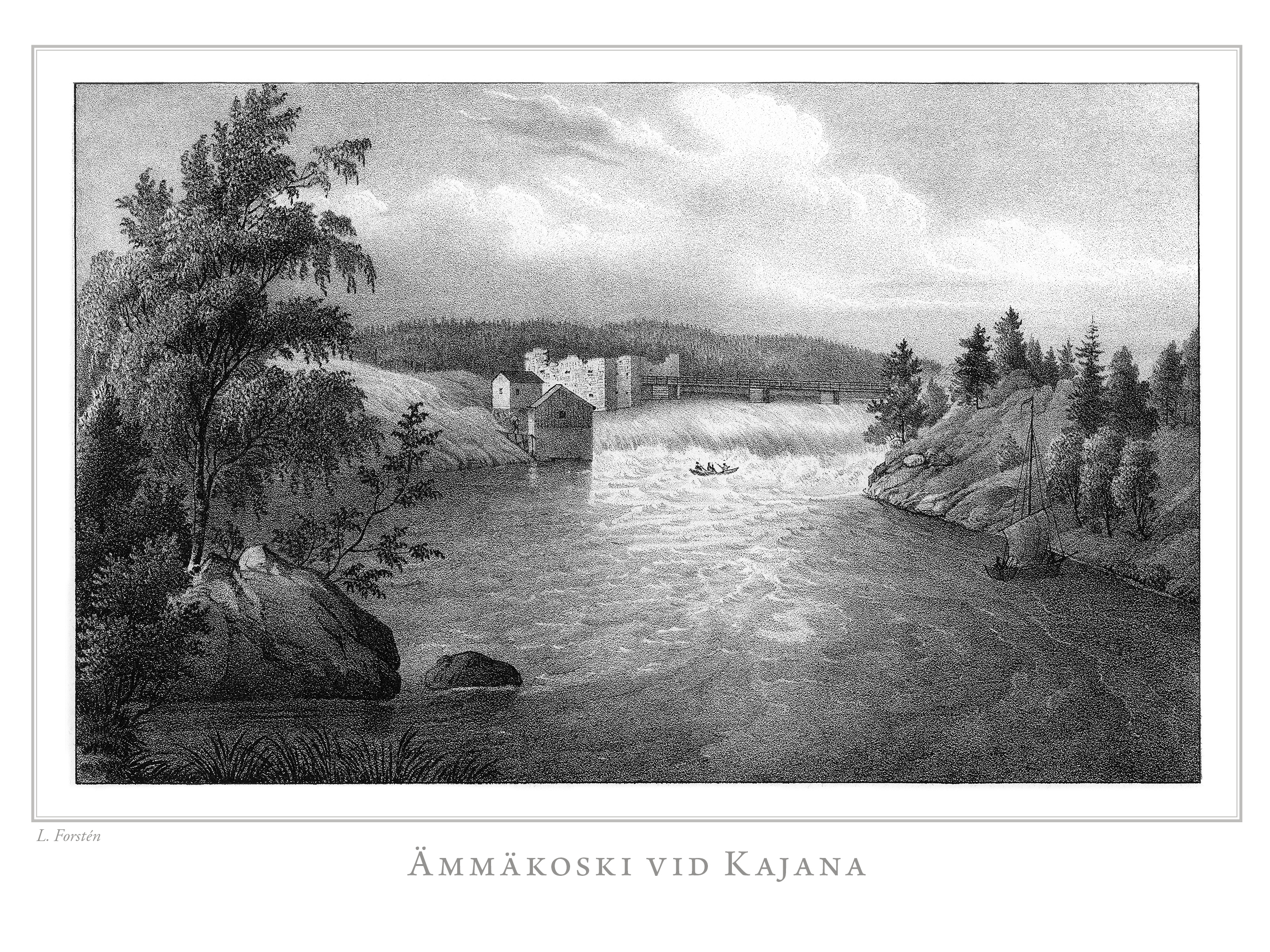
Illustration in Finland framstäldt i teckningar edited by Zacharias Topelius and published 1845-1852.

Kajaaninjoki (Swedish: Kajana älv) is a river in the region of Kainuu, Finland.

The river runs from Lake Nuasjärvi to Lake Oulujärvi through the town of Kajaani. From there the waters flow through the Oulujoki river into the Gulf of Bothnia. The river drains a chain of lakes that originates in the municipalities of Kuhmo and Sotkamo in Kainuu (Finnish: Sotkamon reitti).

Kajaani Castle, a ruined 17th-century greystone fortress is located on an islet in the Kajaaninjoki, between the Ämmäkoski and Koivukoski rapids. Before the castle was built in the early 17th century and named Cajanaborg, the river was known as Vuohenginjoki, Vuohenkijoki, or Vuohenki. The name Ämmänjoki was also used, derived from the Ämmäkoski rapids.

== See also ==
- List of rivers of Finland
