= QIMA =

Quality Control & Compliance Company

QIMA is a quality control and compliance company with a focus in Testing, Inspection, and Certification (TIC) for the consumer products, food & agriculture commodities and life sciences industries. It provides services such as factory and supplier audits, laboratory testing, and product inspection in Asia, Africa, Australia, Europe, North America, and South America.

QIMA was founded by Sébastien Breteau in 2005 under the name AsiaInspection.

== History ==
French businessman Sébastien Breteau founded AsiaInspection in 2005. At launch, it provided a web-based platform for ordering quality inspections from factories in China and receiving the results online.

AsiaInspection was featured in the 2015 book Les Réseaux de la malbouffe by Géraldine Meignan in the section on controlling the compliance of Asian factories with health standards.

In 2017, AsiaInspection acquired the Mexican pre-customs clearance inspection service provider GOAL. In the same year, AsiaInspection acquired the American company PIA (Produce Inspectors of America).

The company changed its name from AsiaInspection to QIMA in 2018.

In 2020, QIMA released QIMAone, a platform providing digital quality management and data analysis. In the same year, QIMA acquired the Mexican standardization and certification organization Normalización y Certificación (NYCE).

In December 2021, Caisse de Depot et Placement du Quebec (CDPQ) acquired a minority stake in QIMA.

QIMA expanded into cybersecurity and testing for related products after it acquired the Hungarian software lab CCLab in 2022.

In March 2025, QIMA partnered with Retraced to integrate its on-site auditing services with Retraced's platform. In the same month, TA Associates made an investment into QIMA.

In October 2025, QIMA partnered with EcoVadis to launch a new supply chain sustainability auditing offering.

QIMA offers factory and supplier audits, laboratory testing, and product inspection. QIMA also monitors the working conditions and environment of factories, watching for conditions such as illegal child labor and labor and safety violations.
