= E. Roe Stamps =

American businessmen

E. Roe Stamps IV is an American businessman, investor, and philanthropist who established the Stamps Scholarship. He is the founding partner of the private equity firm Summit Partners. He is also a member of the Georgia Tech Foundation Board of Trustees.

== Early life and education ==
Stamps graduated from the Georgia Institute of Technology with a B.S. (1967) and an M.S. (1972) in industrial engineering. He also holds an MBA from Harvard Business School (1974).

== Career ==
Stamps worked as a partner at TA Associates and as a senior investment manager at First Chicago Corporation. He also spent five years as director of Ameripath and seven years as a member of the board of the Pediatrix Medical Group.

In 1984, he co-founded Summit Partners, a private equity and venture capital firm based in Boston. Ultimately, Summit Partners invested in 350 business and has completed more than 125 public offerings, and now has more than $30 billion under management.

=== Public service ===
Stamps is a member of the board of trustees of the Georgia Tech Foundation and the Intrepid Fallen Heroes Fund. In 2004, the National Venture Capital Association presented him with their Outstanding Service Award for his work to engage the venture capital industry in public policy.

In 2006, he was named a trustee of the John S. and James L. Knight Foundation.

== Stamps Family Charitable Foundation ==
Stamps is a benefactor in the Stamps Family Charitable Foundation. Stamps received an honorary degree from Elizabethtown College after their first class of Stamps Scholars graduated in May 2015, and an honorary doctorate from Georgia Tech in 2014.

== Personal life ==
Stamps and his wife, Penny, retired to Miami in 2001. Stamps is a private pilot.
