= U-blox =

Swiss semiconductor company

u-blox Holding AG
- Type: Public
- Traded as: SIX: UBXN
- Industry: Semiconductors, Internet of Things (IoT)
- Founded: 1997
- Headquarters: Thalwil, canton of Zürich, Switzerland
- Key people: Stephan Zizala (CEO); André Müller (Chairman)
- Revenue: ▲SFr 262.9 million (2021)
- Operating income: ▲SFr 121.8 million (2021)
- Net income: ▲SFr 101.8 million (2021)
- Number of employees: 850 (2025)
- Website: www.u-blox.com

u-blox is a Swiss company that creates wireless semiconductors and modules for consumer, automotive and industrial markets. They operate as a fabless IC and design house. The company originated as a spin-off from ETH Zurich and was founded in 1997.

Listed at the Swiss Stock Exchange (SIX:UBXN), it has offices in the US, Singapore, China, Taiwan, Korea, Japan, India, Pakistan, Australia, Ireland, the UK, Belgium, Germany, Sweden, Finland, Italy and Greece.

In 2025, private equity firm Advent International agreed to acquire u-blox via a public tender offer, and later announced completion of the transaction.

== History ==
Based in Thalwil, Switzerland, u-blox is a spin-off of the Swiss Federal Institute of Technology in Zurich (ETH) and was founded in 1997. Thomas Seiler served as CEO for two decades until his retirement on December 31, 2022, when his position was taken over by Stephan Zizala.

In 2016, the company opened a new office in Taipei, Taiwan. On November 26, 2025, three months after agreeing to buy it for $1.3 billion, it was announced that the private equity firm Advent International had completed the acquisition of the company.

u-blox listed its shares on the SWX Swiss Exchange (now SIX Swiss Exchange) in October 2007.

== Products and technology ==
u-blox develops and sells chips and modules that support global navigation satellite systems (GNSS), including receivers for GPS, GLONASS, Galileo, BeiDou and QZSS. The wireless range consists of GSM-, UMTS- and CDMA2000 and LTE modules, as well as Bluetooth- and WiFi-modules. All these products enable the delivery of complete systems for location-based services and M2M applications (machine-to-machine communication) in the Internet of Things, that rely on the convergence of 2G/3G/4G, Bluetooth-, Wi-Fi technology and satellite navigation. A collaboration to create GNSS receiver that work globally was started between u-blox, SoftBank and ALES in 2021. One year later, in 2022, u-blox released the at the time smallest LTE Cat 4 Module LARA-L6. The company launched a dual-band GNSS module in 2023 that uses the L1 as well as the L5 GPS frequency bands. In 2024 u-blox released the LEXI-R10, which was, according to the company, the smallest LTE Cat 1bis module at time of launch.

== Acquisitions ==
They acquired a dozen companies after their IPO in 2007, after acquiring connectblue in 2014 and Lesswire in 2015 they acquired Rigado's module business in 2019. In 2020, u-blox acquired Thingstream. In 2021, u-blox AG acquired Sapcorda Services GmbH, a provider of high precision GNSS (global navigation satellite system) services. and Naventik GmbH, a German company specializing in the development of safe positioning solutions for autonomous driving.
