= Rubix =

Company that distributes industrial supplies

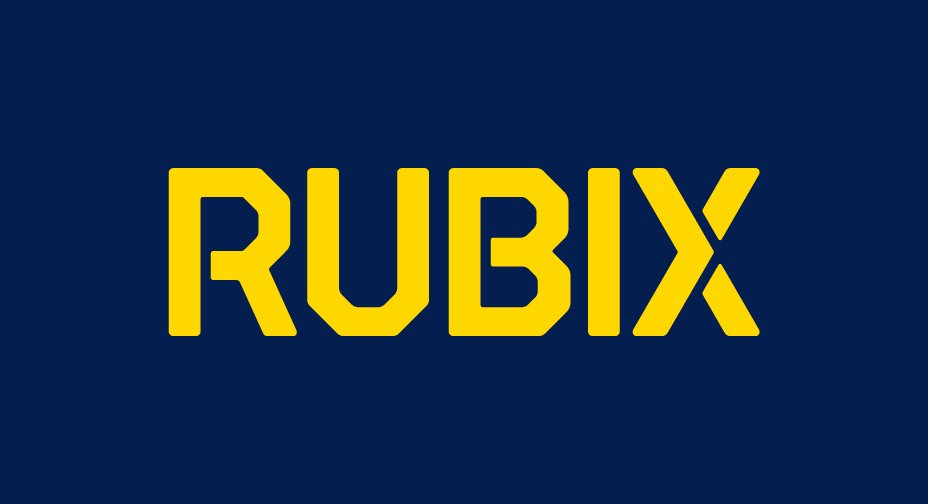
- Type: Limited company
- Industry: Conglomerate
- Founded: 26 June 2018; 8 years ago
- Headquarters: London, United Kingdom
- Area served: Europe
- Key people: David Morkeberg (CEO)
- Products: Industrial engineering, Personal protective equipment, Maintenance (technical), Power transmission
- Revenue: €3.05 billion (2024)
- Number of employees: 9,000 (31/12/2024)
- Website: www.rubix-group.com

Rubix is a British multinational company based in London specialised in the distribution of industrial products and services for industrial engineering, maintenance (technical) and operations. Rubix has become the number 1 company in Europe in the maintenance, repair and overhaul (MRO) sector with 750 locations across 22 countries and a turnover of €3.05 billion in 2024.

The company serves over 220,000 customers and distributes over 2 million products, including bearings, mechanical power transmission components, flow technology and fluid power products, machining, cutting tool materials, personal protective equipment and general maintenance products, as well as logistics and technical services.

Rubix has five exclusive brands: Cutline (high-performance rotary cutting tools), GISS (PPE and safety products), Mecaline (mechanical power transmission products), Roebuck (hand tools), and Spartex (industrial essentials).

== History ==
Rubix was created on 26 June 2018, following the name change of the IPH-Brammer Group. It was created in September 2017 following the merger of the Brammer group and the IPH group, both acquired by US investment fund Advent International in 2017.

Rubix has been ranked Number 28 on the 2020 Sunday Times HSBC Top Track 100. In August 2022, Rubix achieved a Gold EcoVadis sustainability rating, placing them in the top 2% of companies in their industry. In 2021, Rubix reduced Scope 1 emissions by 26%, Scope 2 emissions by 8%, and Scope 3 emissions by 25%.

== Corporate affairs ==
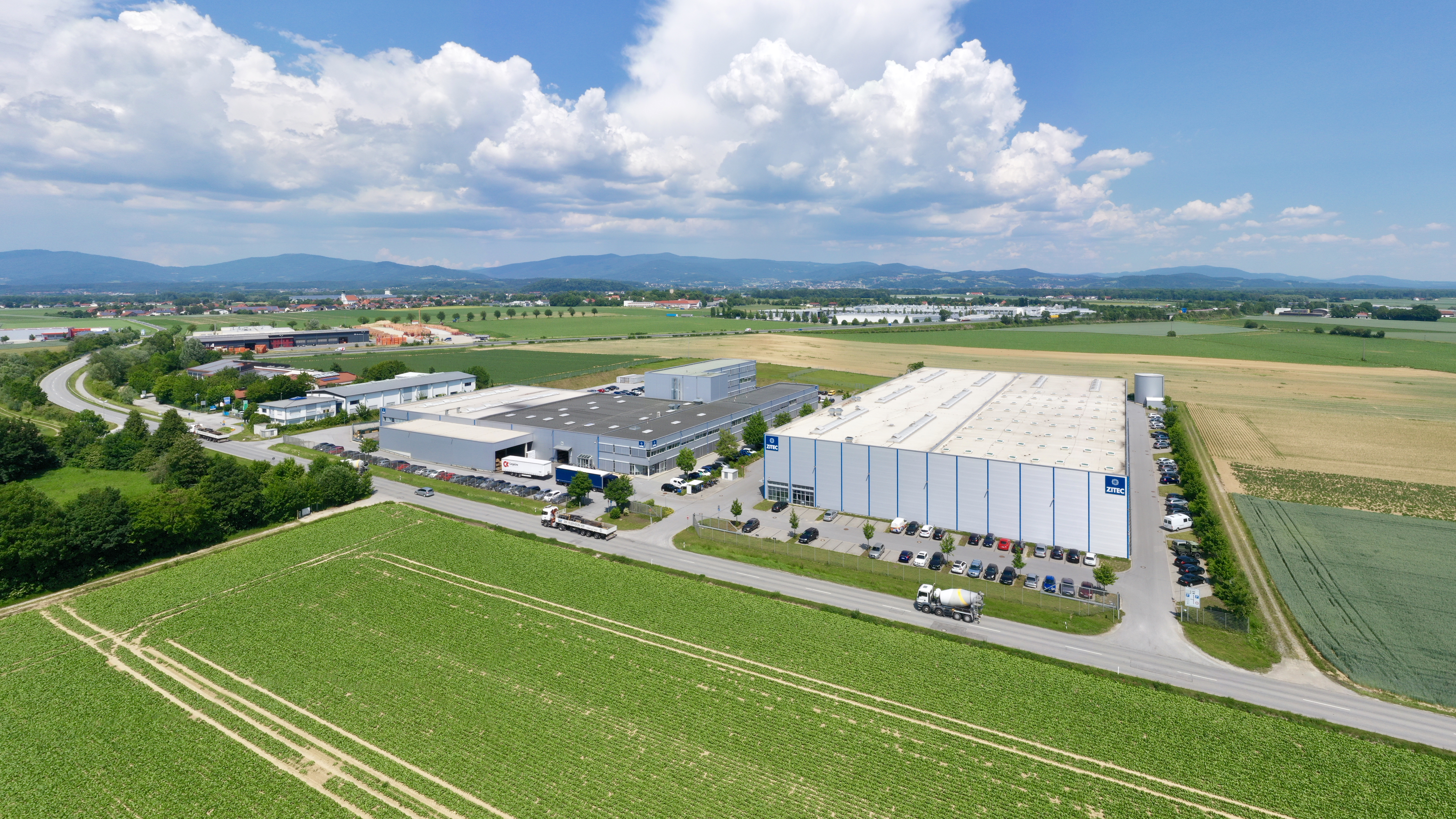
Facility in Plattling, Germany

=== Executive management ===
The executive board members are:

- David Morkeberg, Chief Executive Officer
- Katy Phillips, Chief Financial Officer

while country general managers are:

- Tiziano Biasoli, Italy
- Jesus Martinez Planas, Spain
- Alexandre Labasse, France
- Paul van der Rest, Benelux and Nordics
- Vince McGurk, UK, Ireland and Iceland
- Pedro Guaracy, Central and Eastern Europe
- Maarten Bode, DACH

== Countries and Subsidiaries ==
Rubix provides industrial products and services in 22 countries: Austria, Belgium, Czech Republic, Denmark, Finland, France, Germany, Hungary, Iceland, Ireland, Italy, Luxembourg, Netherlands, Norway, Portugal, Poland, Romania, Slovakia, Spain, Sweden, Switzerland and the United Kingdom.

- Advanced Industrial Rewinds (AIR) (United Kingdom)
- AKN (Germany)
- Barlotti (Italy)
- Bedu (Netherlands)
- Brammer (multiple locations)
- BT Brammer (Netherlands)
- Brammer Buck & Hickman (United Kingdom)
- Buenaventura Giner (Spain)
- Cañellas Protecció S.L.U. (Spain)
- Casa das Correias (Portugal)
- CompCare (United Kingdom)
- C.Plüss (Switzerland)
- Deritend (United Kingdom)
- DHSF (Spain)
- EFC (Netherlands)
- Escudier (France)
- Fluidmec (Italy)
- FIPA (France)
- GeeveHydraulics (Netherlands)
- Gondrom (Germany)
- Hafner (Poland)
- Holding Europeo de Compresores (Spain)
- Hydraflow Hydraulics (United Kingdom)
- Julsa (Spain)
- Kistenpfennig (multiple locations)
- Knowlton & Newman (United Kingdom)
- LERBS Group (Germany)
- Madridferr (Spain)
- Rubix Spa (Minetti) (Italy)
- Magema (Netherlands)
- Martin Depner (Germany)
- Matara (United Kingdom)
- Matrix (United Kingdom)
- MCA (Netherlands)
- Montalpina (Switzerland)
- Motronic Service Sabadell (Spain)
- Nova Modet (Italy)
- Novo Tech (Romania)
- NT Transmissions (France)
- Orexad Brammer (France)
- Outilacier (France)
- Peter Campbell Sales (PCS) (United Kingdom)
- PePe (Poland)
- Petean (Italy)
- RCDE France (Master Outillage) (France)
- Robod (Poland)
- Rubix Benelux (Benelux)
- Rubix Iceland (Iceland)
- Schäfer Technik (Germany)
- SEALL (Czech Republic)
- Sistemas De Manipulación Asistida (SMA) (Spain)
- Solyro (France)
- Stop Fluid (Spain)
- Suministros Navarro (multiple locations)
- Syresa (Spain)
- TCB (Netherlands)
- Technidis (France)
- TEST SEALING SYSTEMS (Poland)
- Uniseals (Italy)
- Zitec (Germany)
