= Lifestance Health =

Mental health services provider in the United States

- Type: Public
- Traded as: Nasdaq: LFST; S&P 600 component
- Industry: Behavioral Health
- Founded: 2015
- Headquarters: Scottsdale, AZ
- Revenue: $1.25B (2024)
- Number of employees: 7,424 licensed mental health clinicians (2024)
- Website: lifestance.com

Lifestance Health (Lifestance) is an American outpatient behavioral health services provider. They provide their services in person and via tele-health. Their services include therapy, psychiatry, TMS, and ketamine therapies. They have landed in lawsuits multiple times over labor violations, leaking of customer information, and misleading investors.

== Overview ==
On February 27, 2025, the company announced that Dave Bourdon would become the company's new chief executive officer, replacing Ken Burdick who had been CEO since 2022. Prior to joining Lifestance, Burdick was the CEO of UnitedHealthcare.

According to Lifestance, they employed 7,400 licensed mental health clinicians as of 2024. In 2023, Lifestance posted a $187 million net loss, which was 12% lower than its loss from 2022. The company additionally closed 82 clinics while opening 35 in what was described as a consolidation effort. Lifestance provides in-person services at 569 locations across 33 states. In addition, they provide telehealth services, which account for over 70% of their appointments.

== History ==
Lifestance was founded in 2015. In April 2020, private equity firm TPG acquired Lifestance for $1.2bn in equity. The company went public on June 10, 2021 and raised $720 million in the process. After the IPO, TPG retained partial ownership and along with private equity firms Summit Partners and Silversmith Capital Partners. Together, their block of shares adds up to 66% ownership of the company.

In 2021 Lifestance acquired Seattle based Acquity Counseling, which had 7 locations. In that same year they launched the Not1Face campaign which was an effort to address the mental health crisis in America.

== Controversies ==
In 2023 Lifestance was sued by 15 former employees, in two separate suits, for allegedly breaking labor laws. The employees alleged that Lifestance "forced them to receive salary advances that the employees would have to pay back to the company for the work done during their first six to 12 months of employment if they failed to meet productivity standards." The suit also included a claim that the company's labor practices violate the 13th amendment and constitute indentured servitude.

In January 2024, Lifestance paid $50m to settle a lawsuit from its shareholders that alleged the company misled investors about the retention rate of their clinicians. Following the lawsuit, Hindenburg Research—an activist short-selling firm—released a report about Lifestance that further claimed the company has a problem with retaining clinicians.

As of January 2025, they are facing a class-action lawsuit that alleges the company "shared the personal information of patients with Meta Platforms Inc. without their consent."
