= Mondo Minerals =

- Type: Private
- Industry: Mining and mineral production
- Founded: 1967
- Headquarters: Amsterdam, Netherlands,
- Products: Talc
- Website: www.mondominerals.com

Mondo Minerals, is an independent talc producer headquartered in Amsterdam, Netherlands, with mining and processing operations in Finland, home to Europe’s largest talc reserves. Its main brands are Finntalc, Plustalc and Microtalc. The company develops and markets specialized products for paints and coatings, plastics, cordierite ceramics, consumables, pharmaceutical and paper applications.

Founded in Finland in 1967 as Suomen Talkki Oy, Mondo Minerals operates talc mines in Europe and uses flotation technology in its processing. The company produces talc exclusively. Its Finntalc brand is the company's oldest grade.

In September 2025, the company re-established itself as an independent business under the name Mondo Minerals B.V., formerly Elementis Minerals B.V., continuing its emphasis on sustainable talc innovation and long-term partnerships

== History ==
A process for separating magnesite from talc in talc ore was developed in Finland in the 1960s; the company Suomen Talkki Oy was founded in 1967 to commercialise this invention. Following several production expansions and developments such as rotogravure paper coating talc, Mondo Minerals was established as a joint venture between Omya AG and Western Mining Ltd in 1998. This joint venture included the former Finnminerals Oy, Westmin BV Amsterdam and the talc business of Norwegian Talc AS. Ownership of Mondo Minerals was transferred to Omya AG in 2001. In 2007, Mondo Minerals was acquired by Hg Capital. The company received patents for highly delaminated talc and for talc use in beverage filtration the following year. Recent developments include the first commercial paint talc slurry production, the introduction of compacted talc for the plastics industry, the launch of talc for pharmaceuticals, and a patented exfoliant in personal care formulations. In July 2011, Mondo Minerals has been acquired by Advent International. In October 2018, Elementis, a global specialty chemicals company, acquired Mondo Minerals from Advent International. In September 2025, after a change of ownership, Mondo Minerals regained its independence as Mondo Minerals B.V., reaffirming its strong Finnish roots and expertise in talc production.

== Operation ==
Mondo Minerals owns talc mines in Sotkamo and in Vuonos in central Finland. The company’s headquarters is located in Amsterdam, Netherlands. Further part of the Mondo group are Mondo Minerals Deutschland GmbH, located in Germany and Mondo Trading (Beijing) Co., Ltd., located in China.

== Corporate citizenship ==
Mondo Minerals sponsors the Pesäpallo club Sotkamon Jymy, the most successful Finnish baseball team over the last two decades and home team of the company’s Sotkamo site.
