= Doctrine (company) =

French legal AI startup

- Industry: Legal information
- Founded: 2016 in Paris
- Founder: Nicolas Bustamante, Antoine Dusséaux, and River Champeimont
- Headquarters: Paris, France
- Area served: France, Italy, Germany, Luxembourg, Spain
- Website: www.doctrine.fr

Doctrine (also known as Doctrine.fr) is a French startup created in 2016. In September 2026, RELX, owner of LexisNexis, acquired Doctrine.

== History ==
Doctrine was created in June 2016 by Nicolas Bustamante, Antoine Dusséaux, and River Champeimont.

In 2020, Doctrine launched the "Document Analyzer" feature, which detects and enriches legal sources in documents.

In April 2023, the company announced that it would be acquired by the investment funds Summit Partners and Peugeot Invest for more than €100 million.

In December 2023, Doctrine announced its acquisition of Jobexit, marking the company's first acquisition.

In 2024, Doctrine expanded into Italy. That same year, it received coaching from the CNIL on GDPR and signed a partnership agreement with the Paris Bar.

In 2025, Doctrine entered the German market with a minority investment in legal information provider Dejure and in 2026, Doctrine expanded to Spain by acquiring Spanish legal information provider Maite.

In 2026, RELX, parent company of LexisNexis, announced that it entered into an agreement to acquire Doctrine.

== Business model ==
The search engine relies on algorithms and artificial intelligence and is commercialised on a subscription-based model.

== Legal proceedings ==
In 2018, Doctrine was sued by its competitors LexisNexis, Dalloz, Wolters Kulwer France, Lexbase and Lextenso for unfair competition. In February 2023, the Tribunal de commerce de Paris ruled in favour of Doctrine on the merits, rejecting the publishers' claims and ordering them to pay €50,000 in damages for abusive proceedings.. In 2025, the Paris Court of Appeal overturned the judgment (except with regard to parasitic competition and misleading commercial practices), and ordered the publisher of Doctrine, on grounds of unfair competition, to pay each of the 5 publishers between €40,000 and €50,000 in damages, plus €30,000 in legal costs, and to publish an extract of the ruling on its website, finding that it had obtained hundreds of thousands of court decisions through unlawful means. Doctrine stated that it was satisfied with the ruling, as it did not require the company to remove any decisions from its database, and announced that it would not seek an appeal to the Court of Cassation.

In September 2018, the French National Bar Council and the Paris Bar Association, taking the view that lawyers' personal data had been used without their knowledge, filed a criminal complaint against Doctrine on various grounds, including impersonation of a lawyer, identity theft, fraud, theft, and unauthorised access to and retention in a computer system. Doctrine stated that it retained the confidence of its investors. The Paris Bar's complaint was dismissed in 2022. In 2020, the Paris Bar filed a further complaint for unauthorised intrusion into an automated data processing system, having detected the extraction of a large number of disciplinary decisions it had issued; this complaint was withdrawn in 2024 following an agreement between Doctrine and the Bar. In February 2022, following a press report in Le Canard Enchaîné referring to ongoing proceedings concerning "a former employee", Doctrine reaffirmed the lawfulness of its collection of court decisions to power its technology, at a time when a decree of September 2021 had instructed the Council of State and the Court of Cassation to make their decisions available online. In 2025, a former Doctrine employee who, in May 2018, had stolen the login credentials of a clerk at the Poitiers civil court and used them to harvest more than 52,000 decisions — which had been made immediately available to Doctrine's subscribers — was sentenced to ten months' imprisonment suspended and a fine of €30,000. Doctrine maintained that it had suspended and then dismissed the employee as soon as the facts came to light (a settlement agreement having ultimately been negotiated), and had removed the disputed decisions from its database. Separate proceedings against Doctrine itself for handling stolen goods remain ongoing.

In 2022, Doctrine sued France before the European Court of Human Rights to gain access to the Tribunal de Paris' decisions.

== Leadership ==
=== CEO ===
- Nicolas Bustamante (2016–2020)
- Guillaume Carrère (since 2020).
