= Pohjavaara =

Village in Sotkamo, Finland

Coordinates: 64°15′N 28°03′E

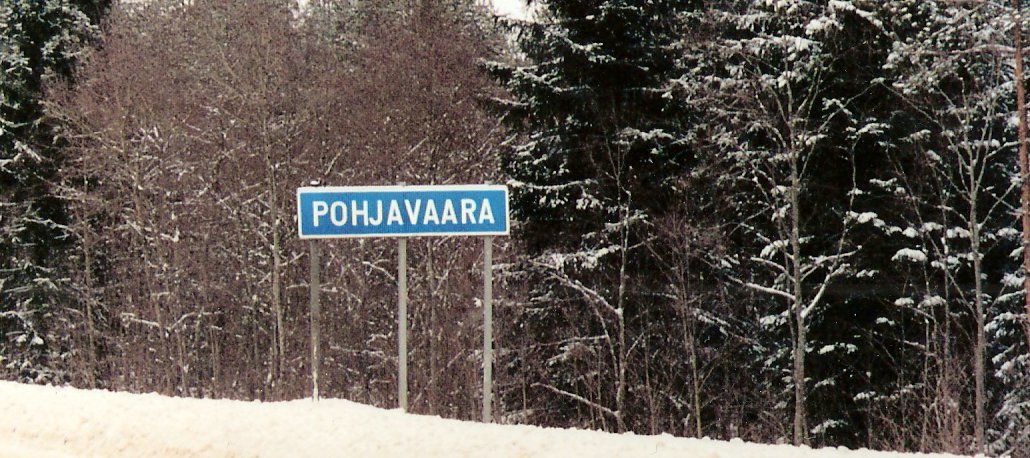
Pohjavaara.

Pohjavaara is a village in the municipality of Sotkamo in Kainuu, Finland. There are many organic farmers in the village, which is known its potatoes. Pohjavaara's postal code is 88490.

The village has schools (Pohjavaaran koulu) for classes 1–6. During the 2007–2008 school year, there were three teachers and 45 children enrolled.
