= SuperPark =

Finland-based indoor park operator

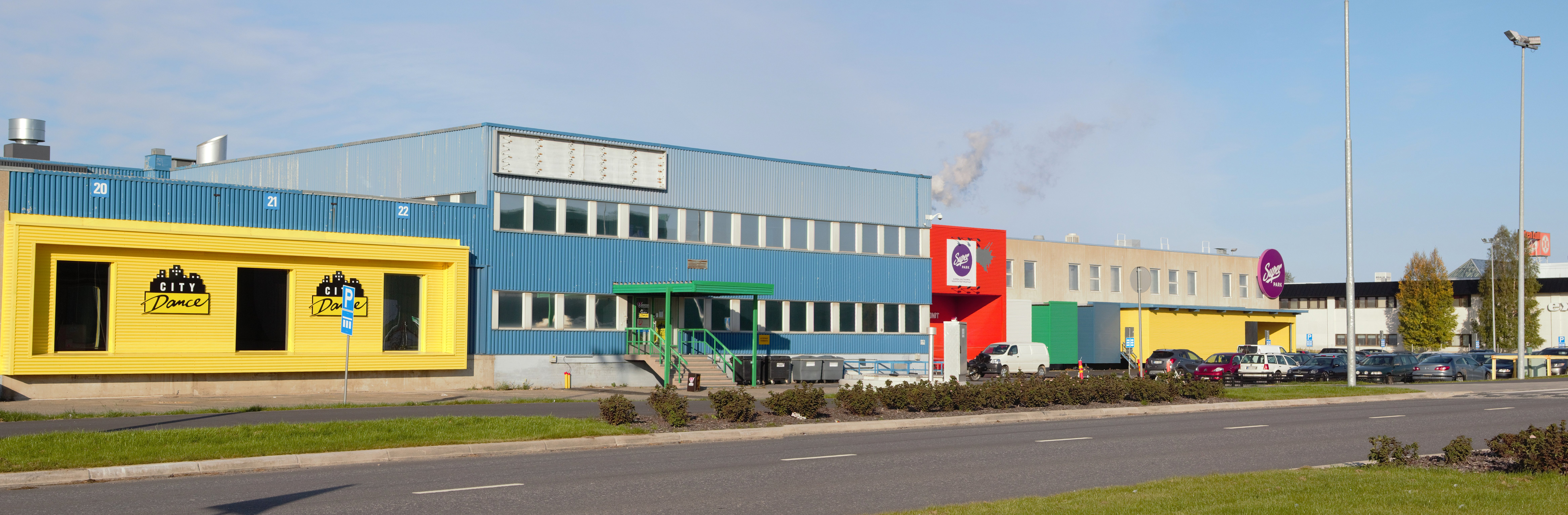
SuperPark Oulu in 2014

SuperPark is an indoor game park operator. It was founded by Taneli Sutinen in Vuokatti, Finland in 2012. It launched its first park outside Finland in Hong Kong in 2017. Since then, it has launched parks in Singapore, Kuwait, Philippines, Malaysia, and Indonesia among others. It was acquired by private equity firms Sentica Partners and Tesi in 2018.

In 2018, SuperPark was a subject of a National Institutes of Health study that aimed to look at the benefits of visiting an indoor activity park for 7 to 12 year olds. It was found that "visiting SuperPark has the potential to improve health".

== International presence ==
SuperPark began operations in Singapore's Suntec City mall in 2018. It shut down in 2020. This was largely due to SuperPark's holding company in Asia, SuperPark Asia Group, going under interim judicial management with $18 million in liabilities. In 2023, The Business Times reported that DreamUs will take over the park.

== See also ==
- KidZania
- Universal Studios
