= Summit Partners =

American private equity firm

Summit Partners, L.P.
- Type: Private
- Industry: Financial services
- Founded: 1984; 42 years ago
- Founder: Roe Stamps; Stephen Woodsum; Gregory Avis
- Headquarters: Boston, Massachusetts, U.S.
- Key people: Peter Chung (CEO)
- Products: Private equity Venture capital Private credit Public equity
- AUM: US$35 billion (2024)
- Number of employees: 205 (2024)
- Website: www.summitpartners.com

Summit Partners is an American investment firm based in Boston, Massachusetts. The firm focuses on investing in technology, healthcare, life sciences and other growth industries.

== Background ==
Summit Partners was founded in 1984 by Roe Stamps and Stephen Woodsum, who previously worked together at TA Associates. Greg Avis would also join as a co-founder shortly after. The firm is considered one of the earliest private equity firms to focus on growth investing.

In 2000, the three co-founders handed over daily management of the firm to five partners.

In 2015, the firm acquired Alydar Capital. It now operates as the public equity investment arm of Summit Partners.

In January 2024, it was reported that Summit Partners' credit arm ceased making new investments after it struggled with its latest fundraising due to poor performance of its credit funds. The credit business is seen as an awkward fit for Summit Partner which focuses on growth equity and the firm had previously tried to sell credit business in the previous year.

Summit Partners is headquartered in Boston with additional offices in Menlo Park, London and Luxembourg.

== Business overview ==
Summit Partners has three main business lines, which are:

- Growth & Venture
- Credit
- Public Equity

The firm typically invests in later-stage companies that have already been established with the objective of providing further growth. Its private equity investments typically range from $30 million to $500 million each, while its venture capital investments range from $5 million to $30 million each. The firm also provides debt financing as well as public equities' investment services.

Notable investments made by Summit Partners include Uber, McAfee, Avast, Infor, Flow Traders, Doctrine, ShipMonkand Lifestance Health.
