= Nuasjärvi =

Nuasjärvi-Rehja
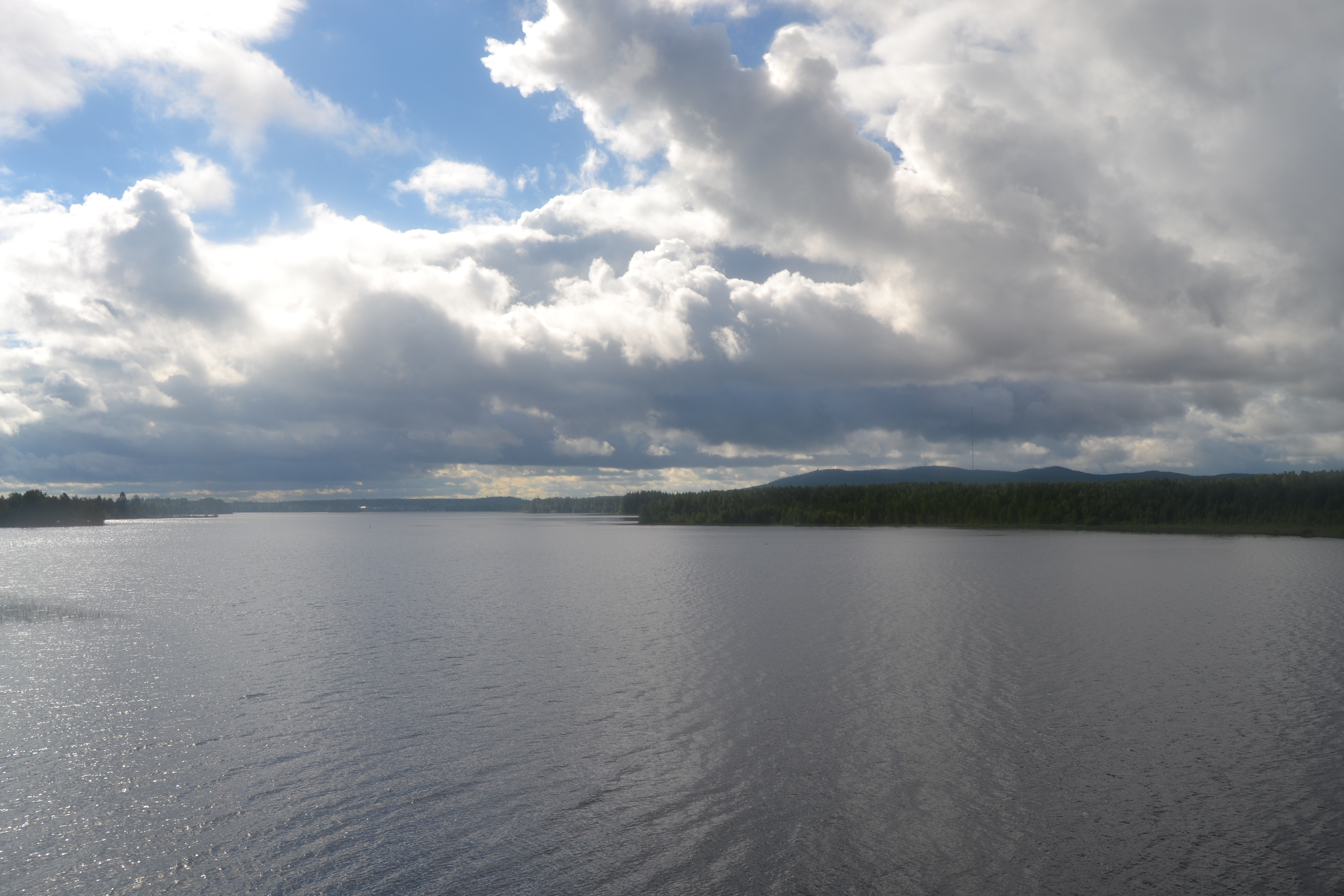

- Location within Finland
- Coordinates: 64°10′N 28°03′E
- Type: Lake
- Primary inflows: Tenetti
- Primary outflows: Sipinen
- Catchment area: Oulujoki
- Basin countries: Finland
- Surface area: 96.44 km^{2} (37.24 sq mi)
- Average depth: 8.52 m (28.0 ft)
- Max. depth: 44 m (144 ft)
- Water volume: 0.822 km^{3} (666,000 acre⋅ft)
- Shore length^{1}: 171.31 km (106.45 mi)
- Surface elevation: 137.9 m (452 ft)
- Frozen: December–April
- Settlements: Sotkamo
- ^{1} Shore length is not a well-defined measure.

Nuasjärvi is a medium-sized lake in Kainuu region in northern Finland. It is located in Sotkamo and it belongs to the Oulujoki main catchment area. Nuasjärvi is separated from another lake Rehja with strait Rimpilänsalmi. The lake is near the Vuokatti Ski and Golf Center.

The lake is affected by saline mine water originating nearby Talvivaara Terrafame Ni-Zn mine and the benthic ecosystem is deteriorating due to mine pollution

== See also ==
- List of lakes in Finland
