= Peter Brooke (businessman) =

American businessman (1929–2020)

- Born: October 6, 1929; Worcester, Massachusetts, US
- Died: April 1, 2020 (aged 90); Concord, Massachusetts, US
- Education: Harvard University (BA, MBA)
- Occupation: Businessman
- Known for: Founder of TA Associates, Advent International and Seavi Advent
- Spouse: Anne Russell (m. 1954; died 2016)
- Children: 3 sons

Peter Albert Brooke (October 6, 1929 – April 1, 2020) was an American businessman, in private equity. Brooke founded TA Associates in 1968, and Advent International in 1984.

== Early life ==
Brooke was born on October 6, 1929, in Worcester, Massachusetts, the only child of Percy Albert Brooke, a doctor born in England, and a nurse mother of Swedish ancestry.

Brooke was educated at Phillips Exeter Academy and Harvard College. He earned an MBA from Harvard Business School in 1954.

== Career ==
In 1968, he founded TA Associates.

In 1984, he founded Advent International, which has been called the first global private equity firm.

In 1984, he also founded SEAVI Advent, the first private equity firm in South East Asia.

Brooke retired as CEO of Advent in 1996. He is the co-founder (with his son, John Brooke) of Brooke Private Equity Associates (BPEA).

== Personal life ==
Brooke married Anne Russell in 1954, and they had three sons. Sam, Peter, and John. Sam is an architect, Peter is an artist, and John works in private equity. Anne died on October 13, 2016, from heart disease. Brooke lived in Concord, Boston and North Pomfret, Vermont. He died in Concord on April 1, 2020, at the age of 90.
