= Stamps Family Charitable Foundation =

The Stamps Family Charitable Foundation offers merit scholarships to 44 partner colleges and universities in the United States. The foundation and scholarships are named for their benefactors, E. Roe Stamps IV and Penelope W. Stamps. In general, in the scholarship programs focus on the support of outstanding undergraduate students, without regard to need or program of study.

While the Stamps Scholars Program differs among partner institutions, students typically receive substantial four-year stipends. Many of these scholarships cover either full tuition or the full cost of attendance, and they also offer additional funding for educational enhancements such as summer experiences, international travel and study, research opportunities, leadership programs, conferences, and internships. In addition, Stamps Scholars enjoy several other benefits, including the chance to participate in a biennial national convention and access to online networking opportunities.

== History ==
The first Stamps Scholars programs launched in 2006 at the University of Michigan and Georgia Tech. The program expanded in 2009 to include the University of Miami and in 2010 to include Barry University, California Institute of Technology, the University of Florida, University of Illinois, and the University of Virginia. The program has since grown to 44 schools across the country with more than 1,000 current and alumni Stamps Scholars.

== Leadership ==
Mary Snow of Coral Gables, Florida will serve as the executive director of the Stamps Family Charitable Foundation starting on March 31, 2025. She previously served for eleven years as the president and CEO of the Coral Gables Community Foundation.

== Scholarship benefits ==
=== National Convention ===
The Stamps Family Charitable Foundation sponsors a national convention every two years to encourage exchange and collaboration among Stamps Scholars. The conventions offer Stamps Scholars the opportunity to hear from speakers, participate in discussions on a variety of topics, explore the host city’s cultural atmosphere and perform in or watch a talent show featuring performances by Stamps Scholars.

=== Networking ===
Stamps Scholars and alumni have the option to be included in an online, searchable directory, where Scholars can post their career interests and information in order to connect with other like-minded individuals. They also have a private LinkedIn group to enhance their professional opportunities. Stamps Scholars can post their resumes, connect to colleagues and search for contacts, companies, and opportunities. They can participate in and initiate discussions within the group.

== Partners ==
Currently, there are 44 schools that support Stamps Scholars. The following is a list of schools by year in which the scholarship program began:

=== 2006 ===
- Georgia Institute of Technology, Atlanta, GA
- University of Michigan, Ann Arbor, MI

=== 2009 ===
- University of Miami, Coral Gables, FL
- Frost School of Music, Coral Gables, FL

=== 2010 ===
- Barry University, Miami Shores, FL
- California Institute of Technology, Pasadena, CA
- University of California, Los Angeles, CA
- University of Florida, Gainesville, FL
- University of Illinois at Urbana–Champaign, Urbana, IL
- University of Virginia, Charlottesville, VA;

=== 2011 ===
- Elizabethtown College, Elizabethtown, PA
- Miami University, Miami, OH
- Purdue University, West Lafayette, IN
- University of Chicago, Chicago, IL
- University of Georgia, Athens, GA
- University of Washington, Seattle, WA
- Virginia–Maryland College of Veterinary Medicine, Blacksburg, VA
- University of Wisconsin–Madison, Madison, WI

=== 2012 ===
- College of William & Mary, Williamsburg, VA
- Louisiana State University, Baton Rouge, LA
- Mercer University, Macon, GA
- University of California, Berkeley, Berkeley, CA
- University of Maryland, College Park, MD
- University of Southern California, Los Angeles, CA
- University of Texas, Austin, TX

=== 2013 ===
- Morehouse College, Atlanta, GA
- Oberlin College and Conservatory, Oberlin, OH
- Tulane University, New Orleans, LA
- United States Naval Academy, Annapolis, MD
- University of Connecticut, Storrs, CT
- University of Notre Dame, Notre Dame, IN
- University of Mississippi, Oxford, MS
- University of Oregon, Eugene, OR
- University of South Carolina, Columbia, SC
- University of Virginia Darden School of Business, Charlottesville, VA
- Wake Forest University, Winston-Salem, NC
- Washington University in St. Louis, St. Louis, MO

=== 2014 ===
- Dartmouth College, Hanover, NH
- Ohio State University, Columbus, OH
- United States Military Academy, West Point, NY
- University of Pittsburgh, Pittsburgh, PA
- Virginia Polytechnic Institute and State University, Blacksburg, VA

=== 2015 ===
- United States Air Force Academy, Colorado Springs, CO

=== 2016 ===
- University of Missouri, Columbia, MO

== Awards ==
30 Stamps Scholars have gone on to receive other prestigious national awards, including: Beinecke Scholarship, Churchill Scholarship, Critical Language Award, Fulbright Fellowship, Gates Cambridge Scholarship, Goldwater Scholarship, Marshall Scholarship, NSF Graduate Research Fellowship, NDSEG Fellowship, Rhodes Scholarship, Schwarzman Scholarship, Truman Scholarship, and USA Academic All-Star.
