= Buck & Hickman =

Former tool making company

- Industry: Business-to-business distribution of equipment, maintenance and health & personal protective equipment
- Founded: 1830
- Headquarters: Manchester, England
- Number of employees: 600
- Parent: Rubix
- Website: www.buckandhickman.com

Buck & Hickman is a distributor of tools, maintenance and health & safety products. Established in 1840, the company has also produced tools under the Roebuck brand.

Since 2018, Buck & Hickman is part of Rubix.
