= Stamps Scholarship =

Merit based scholarship

- Formation: 2006
- Founder: E. Roe Stamps and Penny Stamps
- Type: Undergraduate scholarship

The Stamps Scholarship is a merit-based undergraduate scholarship that was established in 2006 by E. Roe Stamps and his late wife Penny, with the purpose of enabling extraordinary educational experiences for extraordinary students. Through partnerships with institutions across the nation (and into the U.K.), Scholars receive annual awards that range from $5,400 to $75,000 (four-year awards total an average of $21,600-$300,000) with additional funds for enrichment activities such as summer experiences, international travel and study, research, leadership programs, conferences and internships. Stamps Scholars receive several additional benefits, including the opportunity to attend a biennial national convention and online networking opportunities.

== History ==
The Stamps Scholarship was founded by Roe and Penny Stamps in 2006. The original scholarships were awarded to students at the University of Michigan and Georgia Tech, their alma maters.

The program expanded in 2009 to include the University of Miami and in 2010 to include Barry University, California Institute of Technology, the University of Florida, the University of Illinois and the University of Virginia. The program has since grown to 36 schools across the country with more than 2,600 current and alumni Stamps Scholars.

In 2021, 256 students were awarded Stamps Scholarships.

== Benefits ==
The Stamps Scholarship usually covers tuition, mandatory fees, and room and board for four years of study. Scholars also receive enrichment funds which can be used for studying abroad, internships, or research experiences.

=== National Convention ===
The Stamps Scholars Program sponsors a national convention every two years to encourage collaboration and connection among Stamps Scholars. The conventions offer Stamps Scholars the opportunity to hear from speakers, participate in discussions on a variety of topics, explore the host city's cultural atmosphere and perform in or watch a talent show featuring performances by Stamps Scholars.

=== Networking ===
A major benefit of the Stamps Scholarship is access to a national network of Scholars and alumni who are eager to connect. Scholars have the option to be included in an online, searchable directory, where they can post their career interests and information in order to connect with other like-minded individuals. They also have access to private LinkedIn and Facebook groups to enhance their professional opportunities.

== Criteria and Eligibility ==
The Stamps Scholarship is entirely merit-based and does not consider financial need. The Stamps Scholars Program and the partner schools consider academic merit, leadership potential, and character.

== Awards ==
Stamps Scholars are among the recipients of other prestigious national and international awards, including the Rhodes, Marshall, Truman, and Fulbright. In 2019, 4 of the 32 American Rhodes Scholars were Stamps Scholars, and, in 2023, 5 of the 51 Marshall Scholars were Stamps Scholars.

== Partner schools ==
Schools with a Stamps Scholarship include:

- Barry University
- Boston College
- College of William & Mary
- Dartmouth College
- Elizabethtown College
- Georgia State University
- Georgia Tech
- Louisiana State University
- Mercer University
- Morehouse College
- Northeastern University
- Oberlin College
- Ohio State University
- Purdue University
- Queens' College, Cambridge
- Tulane University
- The U.S. Air Force Academy
- The U.S. Military Academy
- The U.S. Naval Academy
- University of Arizona
- University of Chicago
- University of Connecticut
- University of Florida
- University of Georgia
- University of Illinois
- University of Miami
- University of Michigan
- University of Mississippi
- University of Missouri
- University of Notre Dame
- University of Oregon
- University of Pittsburgh
- University of South Carolina
- University of Southern California
- University of Texas at Austin
- University of Virginia
- Virginia Tech
- Wake Forest University
