= P2 Energy Solutions =

American company

- Industry: Software, Data
- Founded: 1999
- Headquarters: Denver, CO USA
- Key people: J. Scott Lockhart, Chief Executive Officer Derrick Barker, Chief Financial Officer; Fredrick "Fritz" Smith, Chief Revenue Officer Shelley Pettet, Chief Human Resources Officer
- Number of employees: 700 (2011)
- Website: www.p2energysolutions.com

P2 Energy Solutions provides financial and accounting management software, geospatial data, land asset management tools, well lifecycle management solutions, environmental, health & safety solutions and outsourcing services to both the upstream and mid-stream oil and gas sectors as well as the alternative energy sector.

Operating from its headquarters in Denver, Colorado, P2 also has offices in Houston, Texas; Calgary, Alberta, Canada; Fort Worth, Texas; San Antonio, Texas; Livingston, New Jersey; Tampa, Florida; Dubai, UAE; Tunis, Tunisia, Singapore and Perth, Australia.

P2 employs nearly 700 people and was a privately held portfolio company of Vista Equity Partners. On October 7, 2013 P2 Energy Solutions was acquired by a Boston-based private equity firm: Advent International.

== History ==
P2 Energy Solutions was founded in 1999 as Energy Auction Exchange with an ambitious plan to use the Internet to bring efficiencies to many aspects of the upstream petroleum industry. The Company raised its seed capital in 1999, using the proceeds to acquire the Oil & Gas Asset Clearinghouse of Houston. The Clearinghouse operated an open outcry auction of fractional interests in oil & gas properties. Shortly after this acquisition, EAE re-branded itself as Petroleum Place with the goal of becoming the vertical industry Internet portal for the upstream petroleum industry.

In 2000, Petroleum Place raised approximately $100 million in two rounds of financing from venture capital groups and petroleum industry "strategic" investors. It filed an S-1 to register its shares for public offering in May 2000, but these plans were shelved because of the rapidly eroding interest in Internet IPO's.

Petroleum Place then went on a series of acquisitions beginning with Paradigm Technologies, developer of an accounting and Enterprise Resource Planning (ERP) product known as Excalibur, which served many mid-sized to large independent upstream petroleum companies. That transaction was followed in 2002 with the acquisition of Novistar, another upstream accounting software package which had previously been Oracle Energy. Petroleum Place created P2 Energy Solutions from its Paradigm business and merged it with Novistar.

P2’s most recent additions came in 2011, when Explorer Software Solutions, WellPoint Systems, and Beyond Compliance were acquired.

On June 4, 2013, P2 announced their intention to acquire Australian publicly listed company ISS Group, Limited. The completion of the acquisition scheme was publicized in August, 2013.

On April 22, 2014, P2 announced that the former SAP CEO: Léo Apotheker had been formally appointed to P2’s board of directors.

On November 13, 2014, P2 announced their intention to acquire Merrick Systems.

In November 2022, P2 was acquired by IFS AB and its product was rebranded as IFS Energy & Resources.
