= TA Associates =

American private equity firm

TA Associates Management, L.P.
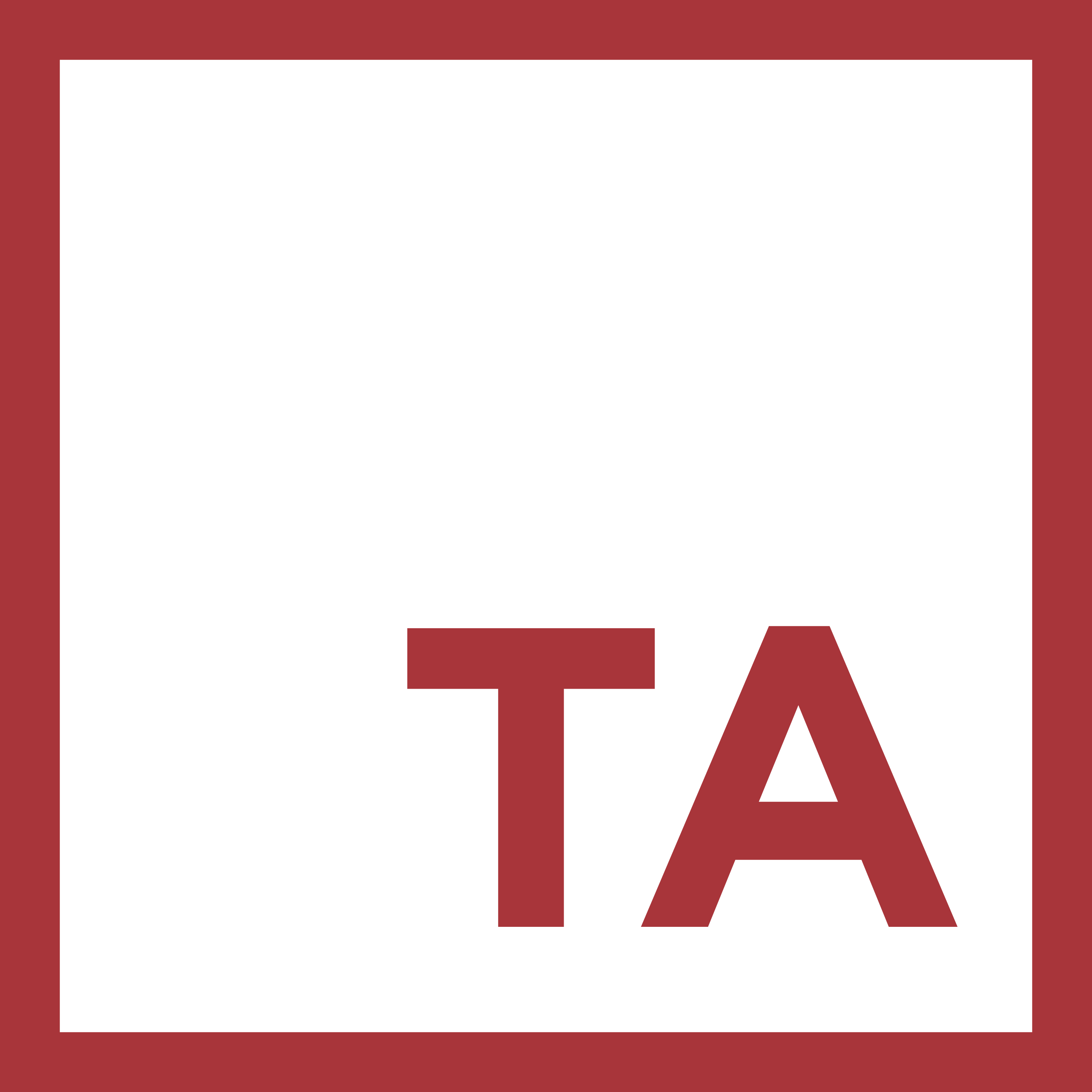

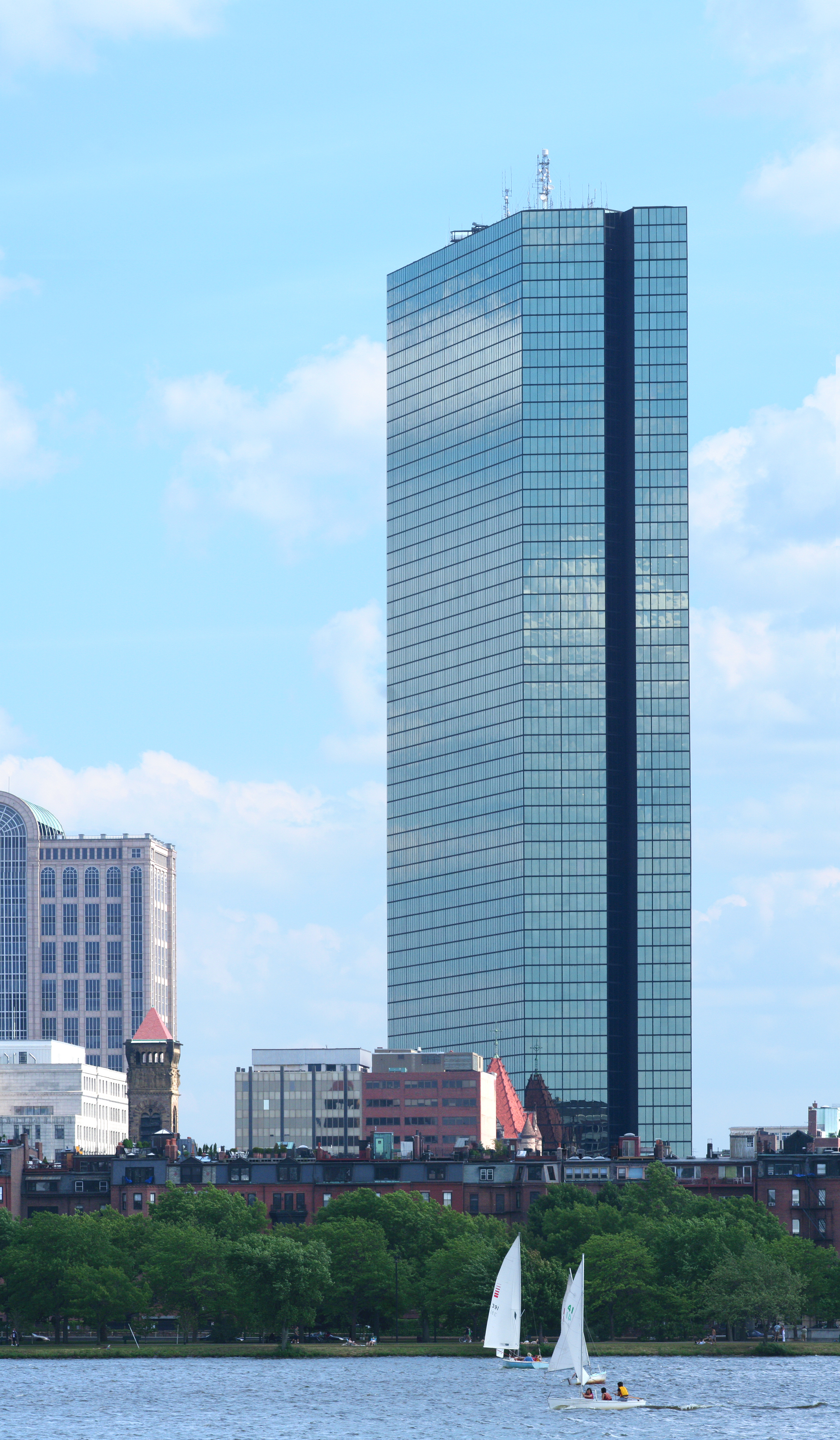
- Headquarters at the John Hancock Tower
- Type: Private
- Industry: Private Equity
- Founded: 1968; 58 years ago
- Founder: Peter Brooke
- Headquarters: John Hancock Tower; Boston, Massachusetts, U.S.
- Key people: Brian J. Conway (chairman); Ajit Nedungadi (CEO)
- Products: Growth capital, Leveraged buyouts, Recapitalizations
- AUM: $55 billion (2026)
- Number of employees: 1193 (2023)
- Website: ta.com

TA Associates Management, L.P. is an American private equity firm and was one of the early modern-era private equity firms in the United States. The firm leads buyouts and minority recapitalizations of profitable growth companies. TA invests across five industry groups: technology, healthcare, consumer products, financial services and business services.

TA Associates has raised $47.5 billion of capital since inception. Since its founding, the firm has invested in more than 560 companies, and been ranked among the 50 largest private equity firms (ranked 27 in 2022) globally.

The firm is headquartered in Boston, Massachusetts, with additional offices in Menlo Park, Austin, London, Mumbai and Hong Kong. As of July 2022, TA had more than 110 investment professionals.

In June 2024, TA Associates ranked 19th in Private Equity International's PEI 300 ranking among the world's largest private equity firms.

On March 26, 2025, TA Associates was named 'Mid-Market Firm of the Year in the Americas' by Private Equity International.

== History ==
TA Associates was founded in 1968 by Peter Brooke with the backing of his former firm, Tucker, Anthony & RL Day, an investment banking and brokerage firm. Prior to founding TA, from 1963 to 1968, Brooke had headed the corporate finance and venture capital activities of Tucker Anthony. Previously, Brooke had been responsible for expanding the private equity activities of Bessemer Securities and had founded the High Technology Lending Group of First National Bank of Boston. At the time it was founded, the firm focused primarily on making venture capital investments in earlier stage companies.

The firm expanded significantly through the 1970s growing from $5 million of capital in 1969 to $125 million by the beginning of the 1980s, making TA the largest independent venture capital firm in a 1980 ranking. Through the 1970s, the firm's investments averaged 30% to 40% annually. Among the firm's notable investments of the 1970s were Biogen, Artificial Intelligence Software, Immunogen and Digital Research. Jacqui Morby, one of the first women to become a partner at a venture capital firm, secured TA's earliest investments in software companies, including Digital Research as well as Capex, McCormack & Dodge, and others.

As the 1980s developed, TA found itself increasingly investing larger amounts in more mature, profitable companies as opposed to the small early stage investments in start-up companies that had characterized the firm's first decade and a half. By the mid-1980s, TA was no longer describing itself as a "venture capital firm", instead using the more general "private equity" description. By the early 1990s, the firm found itself rarely investing in early stage start-up companies, focusing primarily on later-stage growth capital investments in more mature businesses.

Much of this evolution from a regional venture capital investor to global growth private equity firm has been credited to C. Kevin Landry. Landry began his career with TA in 1968, became a General Partner in 1972, Managing Partner in 1982, CEO in 1984 upon the firm's incorporation, and Chairman in 2007. After retiring in 2012, he remained actively involved in the firm and was serving as a Senior Advisor at the time of his death in 2013.

TA Associate's global expansion continued in the 2000s. In 2003, it opened its London office. TA purchased a minority stake in Indian company Idea Cellular in 2006, marking TA's first investment in Asia. TA opened an office in Mumbai in 2009 and one in Hong Kong in 2011, expanding its presence in the Asia Pacific region.

In 2012, certain members of TA Associates leadership, independent of the firm, began financially supporting various conservative political action groups backing candidates in favor of repealing the Dodd–Frank Wall Street Reform and Consumer Protection Act publicly claiming it was "government regulation run amok." Landry was among of the leading Super PAC donors to the 2012 Mitt Romney presidential campaign. Landry told the Boston Globe the Dodd-Frank legislation costs TA more than $600,000 a year in compliance-related costs which would be better spent supporting job growth fueled by private equity firms such as Bain Capital and TA Associates.

In 2014, TA Associates helped organize a syndicated loan worth $1.77 billion for Millennium Health LLC. Most of the loan – $1.27 billion – was channelled back to TA Associates and others, who used it to hand out special dividends. Shortly thereafter, Millennium Health LLC declared bankruptcy. Voya Investment Management, the creditor, subsequently, and unsuccessfully, filed a racketeering lawsuit against TA Associates and Millennium Health founder James Slattery.

Ajit Nedungadi, a managing partner who first joined TA in 1999, became CEO of the company in January 2021. On 8 February 2021, TA Associates-owned British digital auction platform Auction Technology Group (ATG), chaired by WorldRemit CEO Breon Corcoran, announced plans to float in the London Stock Exchange in March 2021. The listing was expected to value ATG at £600 million, and the firm said it was hoping to raise £250 million through the IPO. ATG began trading on the London Stock Exchange on 23 February 2021.

=== Fundraising ===
TA raises capital through a series of numbered flagship funds. In June 2021 it closed TA XIV at its hard cap of $12.5 billion, almost 50% more than its predecessor fund; the fund had been launched in January of that year. In June 2023 TA closed TA XV at its hard cap of $16.5 billion, its largest fund to date, at a time when private equity fundraising had slowed.

=== Spin-out firms ===
As one of the earliest venture capital firms, there are many successful investment firms that trace their lineage back to TA Associates.

TA's founder, Peter Brooke, established Advent International in 1984 as a spin-out from TA. The same year, Roe Stamps and Stephen Woodsum, who had worked together at TA, founded Summit Partners.

== Notable investments ==
In March 2021 TA and Clearlake Capital acquired the data integrity software company Precisely in a deal valued at $3.5 billion.
