= Sotkamo =

- Municipality
- Sotkamon kunta Sotkamo kommun
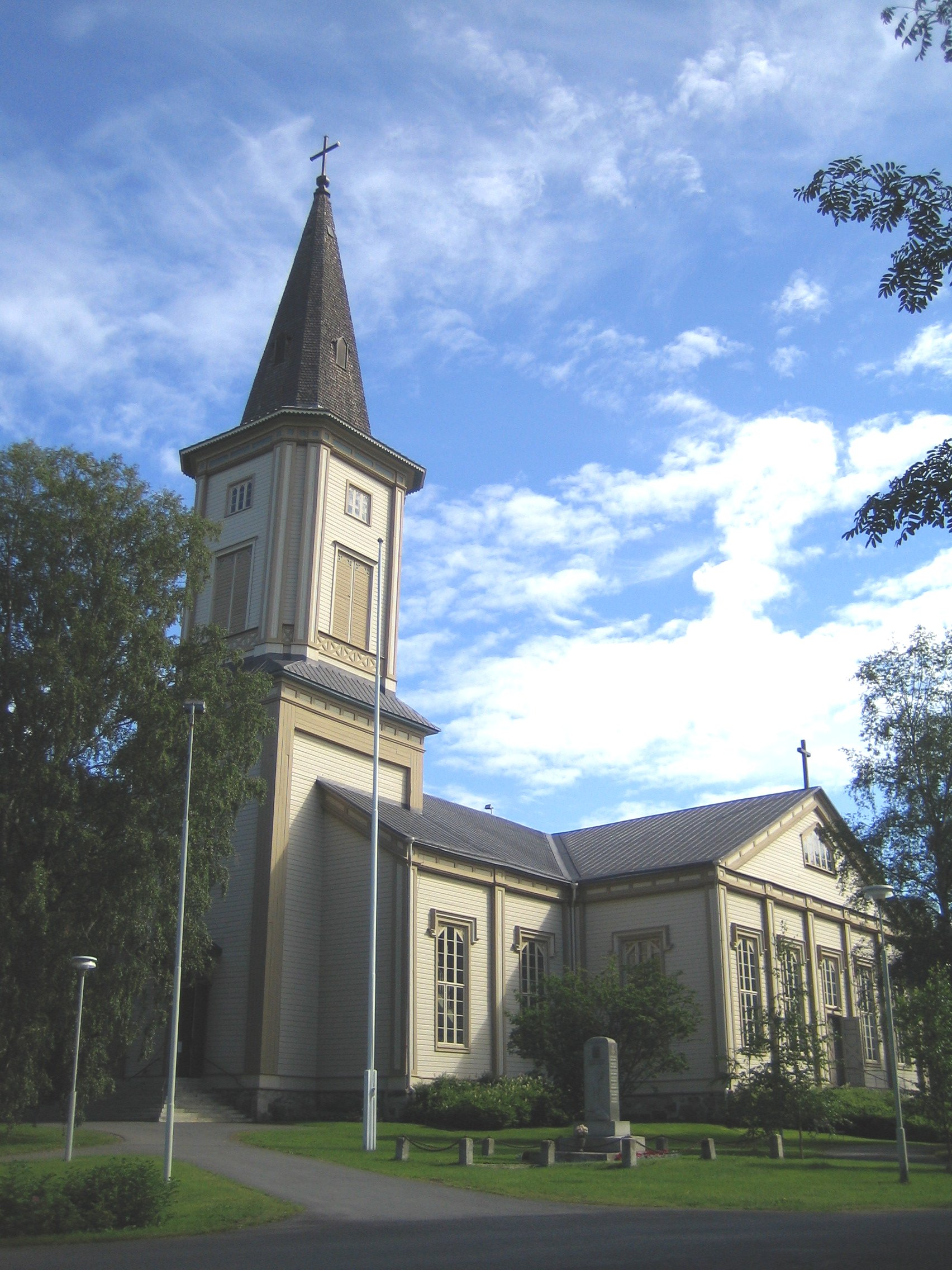
- Sotkamo Church

- Coat of arms

- Location of Sotkamo in Finland
- Interactive map of Sotkamo
- Coordinates: 64°08′N 028°23′E
- Country: Finland
- Region: Kainuu
- Sub-region: Kajaani

Government
  - Municipality manager: Mika Kilpeläinen

Area (2018-01-01)
  - Total: 2,951.86 km^{2} (1,139.72 sq mi)
  - Land: 2,648.88 km^{2} (1,022.74 sq mi)
  - Water: 302.61 km^{2} (116.84 sq mi)
  - Rank: 20th largest in Finland

Population (2025-12-31)
  - Total: 10,161
  - Rank: 96th largest in Finland
  - Density: 3.84/km^{2} (9.9/sq mi)

Population by native language
  - Finnish: 94.5% (official)
  - Swedish: 0.2%
  - Others: 5.3%

Population by age
  - 0 to 14: 14.9%
  - 15 to 64: 58%
  - 65 or older: 27.1%
- Time zone: UTC+02:00 (EET)
  - Summer (DST): UTC+03:00 (EEST)
- Website: www.sotkamo.fi/en/

Sotkamo is a municipality of Finland, located in the Kainuu region about 40 kilometres (25 mi) east of Kajaani, the capital of Kainuu. Vuokatti, in west of Sotkamo, is the most populous village in the municipality and also a popular skiing resort. Both Hiidenportti National Park and Tiilikkajärvi National Park are located in the municipality.

The municipality has a population of 10,161 (31 December 2025) and covers an area of 2,951.86 square kilometres (1,139.72 sq mi) of which 302.61 km^{2} (116.84 sq mi) is water. The population density is 3.84 inhabitants per square kilometre (9.9/sq mi).

In sports, Sotkamo is known for its pesäpallo team, Sotkamon Jymy. The Hiukka Stadium is the home field of Sotkamon Jymy, and its well-known competitor is Vimpelin Veto from Vimpeli, known as long-time arch-enemy of Sotkamon Jymy.

One of the major landmarks of Sotkamo is the sandy beach of Hiukka, which locates by the lake Iso Sapsojärvi, just beside the Sotkamo center. In Vuokatti ski center you can find the lake Nuasjärvi and the Vuokatti Hill.

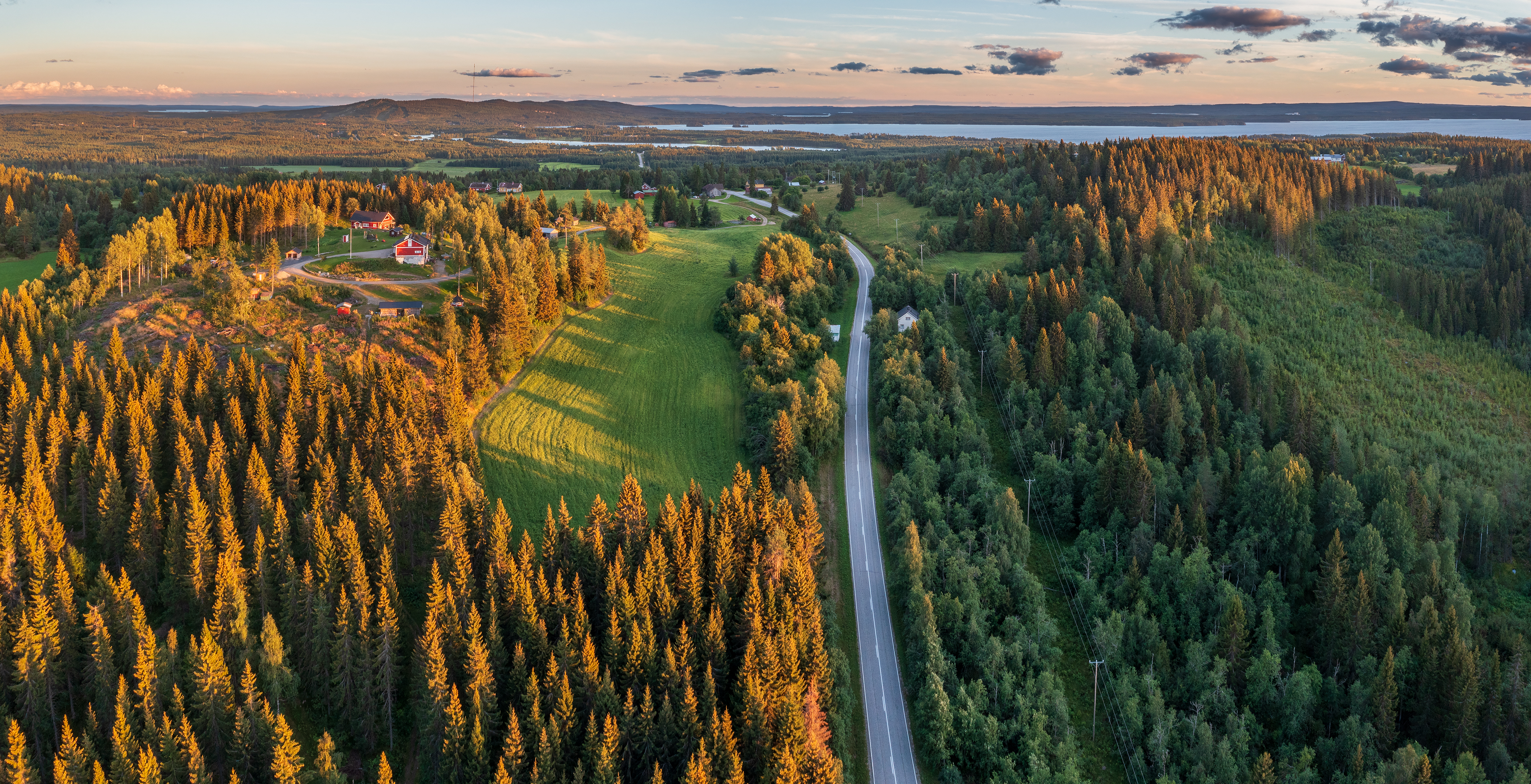
Naapurinvaara hill in Sotkamo. The hill range in the background is in Vuokatti.

== History ==
Sotkamo has grown beside a water route formed by a continuous band of lakes and rivers. The waters of the Sotkamo route run through Kajaaninjoki into Oulujärvi and finally to the Baltic Sea, but in the past the waterways also created an important commercial route to White Sea in the east. The same water route has been used by soldiers of Russia, Sweden and Denmark to rob and ravage this remote countryside for centuries. The name Sotkamo comes either from the Finnish word "sotku" which means a mess and refers to the obscure water route, or from the word "sotka" which was a general name for water birds in ancient Finnish and now designates the common goldeneye.

During the 19th century Sotkamo was visited by notable Finnish artists such as Akseli Gallen-Kallela and Hugo Simberg.

On November 17, 2007 first pictures of the Kern arc were made in the town of Sotkamo by Marko Mikkilä.

== Villages ==
- Alasotkamo
- Heinämäki
- Halmetvaara
- Jormaskylä
- Juholankylä
- Korholanmäki
- Kontinjoki
- Laakajärvi
- Losovaara
- Naapurinvaara
- Nuasjärvi
- Ontojoki
- Paakinmäki
- Pohjavaara
- Riekinranta
- Sipinen
- Sipola
- Soidinvaara
- Sumsa
- Suovaara
- Tipasoja
- Torinkylä
- Tuhkakylä
- Vuokatti
- Ylisotkamo
- Ärväänkylä
- Maanselkä

== Economy ==
Beside tourism, mining is important for the economy of Sotkamo. One of the largest nickel deposits in Europe is located in Talvivaara where the Talvivaara Mining Company started its operation in late 2008. In 2015, after several phases, the mining operations were sold to Terrafame. Sotkamo Silver, listed in the Nasdaq Helsinki stock exchange, mines silver in Sotkamo. Also Mondo Minerals mines talc in Lahnaslampi.

== Politics ==
Results of the 2023 Finnish parliamentary election in Sotkamo:

- Centre Party 27.4%
- Finns Party 23.9%
- National Coalition Party 15.0%
- Christian Democrats 10.7%
- Left Alliance 9.5%
- Social Democratic Party 8.4%
- Green League 2.8%

As of 2021 Finnish municipal elections, Sotkamo municipal council is made up of: Centre Party (11 seats), National Coalition Party (6), Left Alliance (4), Finns Party (4), and Christian Democrats (2).

== Notable people ==
- Anders Chydenius (1729–1803), Lutheran priest and a member of the Swedish Riksdag
- Kalle Arantola (1913–1940), skier
- Veikko Huovinen (1927–2009), author and forester
- Pirjo Häggman (born 1951), sprinter

== See also ==
- Kuhmo
