= Vuokatti =

- Village
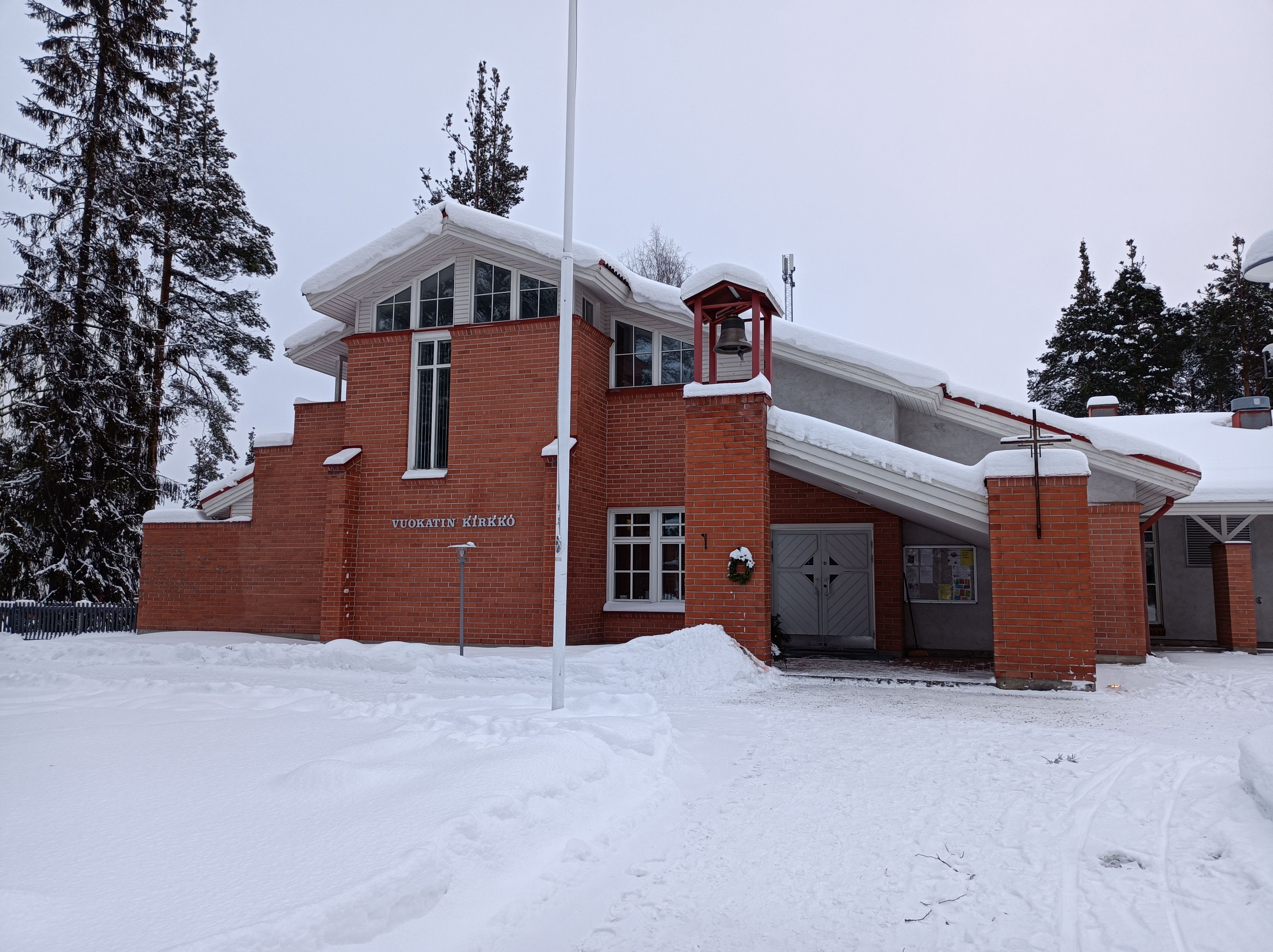
- The church of Vuokatti

- Location in Finland Vuokatti (Finland)
- Coordinates: 64.1458°N 28.2717°E
- Country: Finland
- Region: Kainuu
- Municipality: Sotkamo

Area
  - Total: 138 km^{2} (53 sq mi)

Population (2018-12-31)
  - Total: 6,167
  - Density: 4,453/km^{2} (11,530/sq mi)
- Time zone: UTC+2 (EET)
  - Summer (DST): UTC+3 (EEST)
- Postal code: 88610

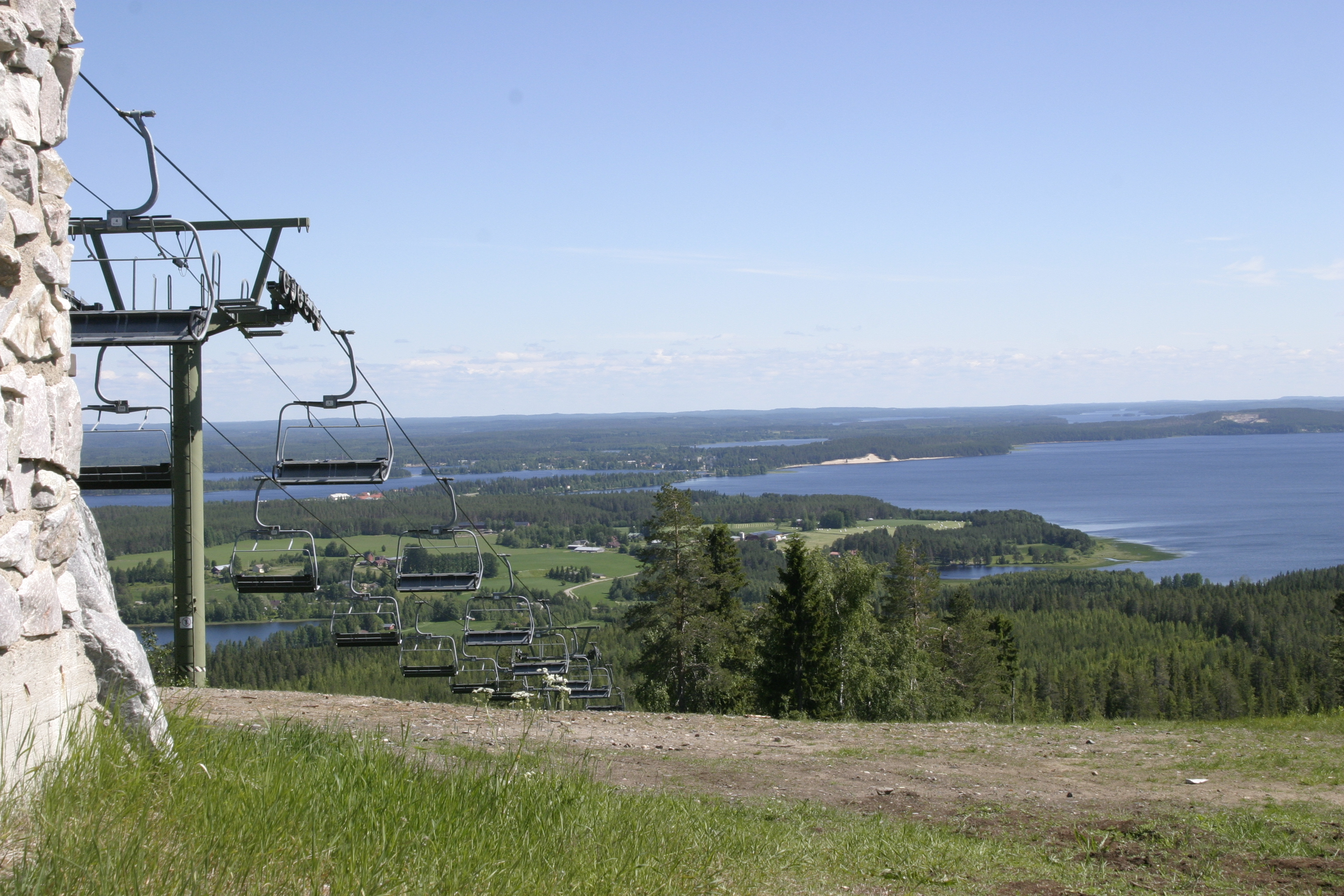
Lake Sapsojärvet and ski lifts on Vuokatinvaara hill.

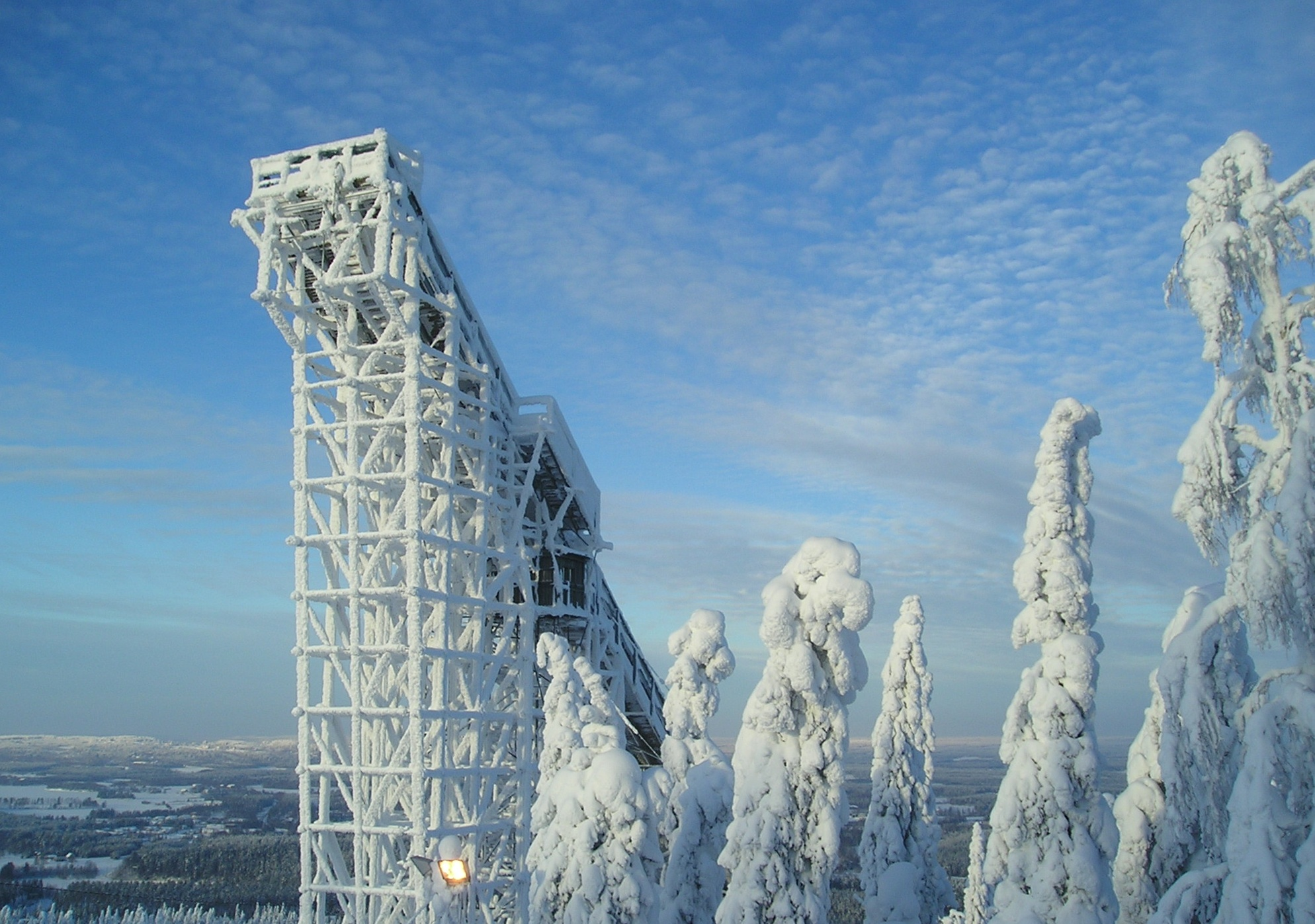
Ski jumping tower at Vuokatti ski resort, Sotkamo.

Vuokatti is an urban area that is a physically separate part of the municipality of Sotkamo, Finland. It is home to more than 6,000 inhabitants, making it the second most populous urban area in the region of Kainuu, after the main urban area of the municipality of Kajaani. Vuokatti is also the name of the nearby forested hill range and the urban area's train station.

The highest hill in the area is the 345 meter high Porttivaara, the second highest being Vuokatinvaara.

Vuokatti has a ski resort, sports academy, a SuperPark, and the Katinkulta resort. There is also a skiing tunnel, which makes cross-country skiing possible in all seasons, and there are also snowboarding and snowtubing tunnels.

Vuokatti has a national Olympic Training Center for winter sports such as Cross-Country skiing, Biathlon and Nordic Combined. Also Vuokatti-Ruka sports academy operates mostly in Vuokatti.

Vuokatti has hosted multiple international sports events, including the European Youth Olympic Days, the World Orienteering Championships, the Nordic Junior World Ski Championships, and the European Youth Olympic Festival.
