= Sapsojärvet =

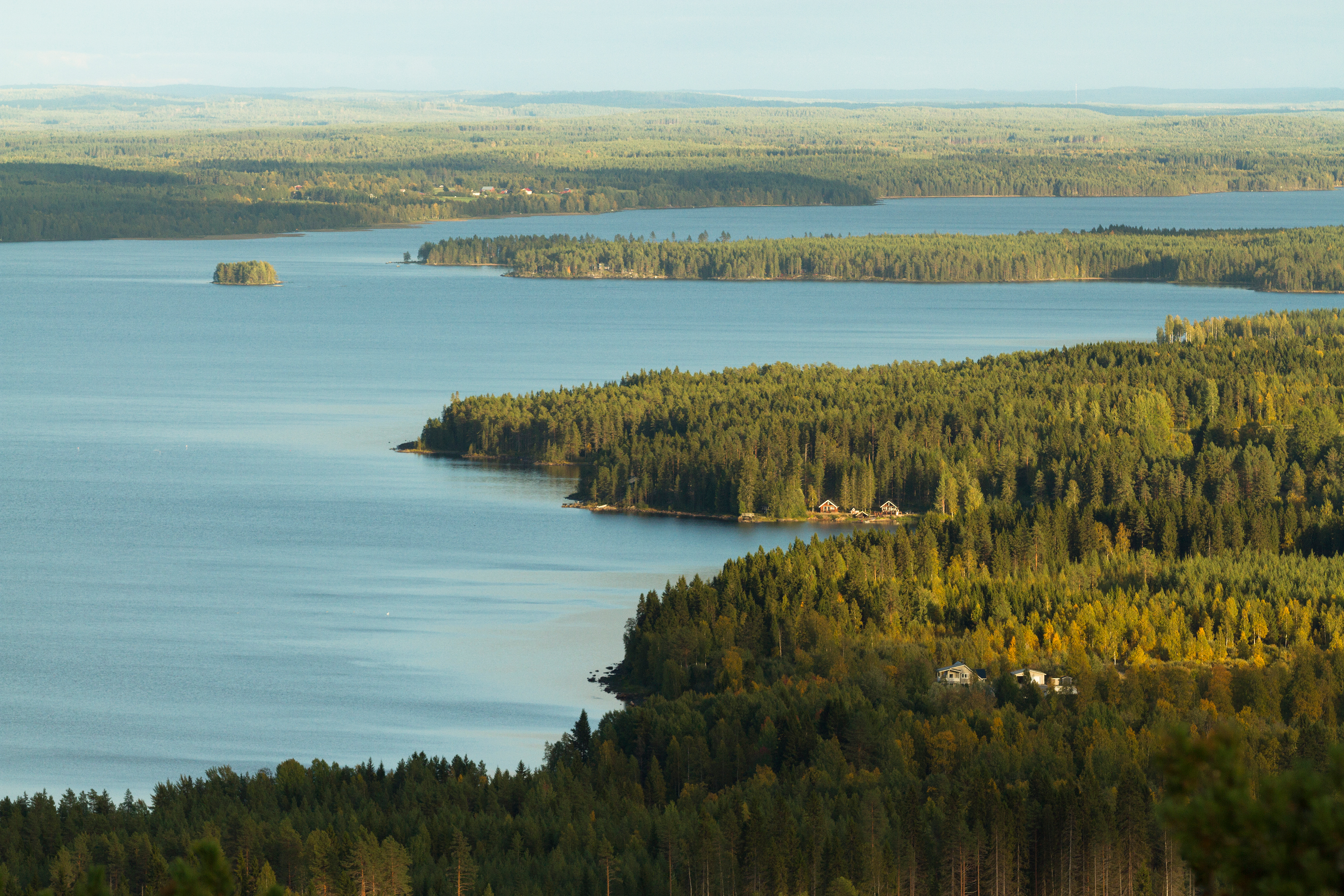

- Location within Finland
- Location: Sotkamo
- Coordinates: 64°06′N 028°27′E
- Type: Lake
- Catchment area: Oulujärvi
- Basin countries: Finland
- Surface area: 19.74 km^{2} (7.62 sq mi)
- Average depth: 6.43 m (21.1 ft)
- Max. depth: 25.73 m (84.4 ft)
- Water volume: 0.127 km^{3} (103,000 acre⋅ft)
- Shore length^{1}: 44.43 km (27.61 mi)
- Surface elevation: 137.9 m (452 ft)
- Frozen: December–April
- ^{1} Shore length is not a well-defined measure.

Sapsojärvet is a medium-sized lake in Kainuu region in northern Finland. The name is in plural, and it can also be in singular: Sapsojärvi. The lake is almost divided in two parts, Iso-Sapsojärvi and Kiantajärvi. The lake in situated in the Sotkamo municipality, quite center in the village. It is often in Finnish television, because in the shore there is a stadium for Finnish baseball.

== See also ==
- List of lakes in Finland
