= Karelians (Finns) =

- Coat of arms of the historical province of Karelia

Regions with significant populations
- North and South Karelia

Languages
- Finnish (Savonian and South Karelian dialects)

Religion
- Lutheranism majority Eastern Orthodoxy minority

Related ethnic groups
- Other Finns, Russian Karelians

Karelians (Finnish: karjalaiset, IPA: [ˈkɑrjɑˌlɑi̯set]), also known as Finnish Karelians or Karelian Finns, are a subgroup (heimo) of the Finnish people, traditionally living in Finnish Karelia. Karelians speak eastern dialects of the Finnish language: the South Karelian dialects are spoken in South Karelia, while the eastern Savonian dialects are spoken in North Karelia. The South Karelian dialects were spoken in the Karelian Isthmus prior to the Winter War. Karelians are traditionally Lutheran Christians, with an Orthodox Christian minority, belonging to either the Evangelical Lutheran Church of Finland or the Orthodox Church of Finland respectively.

Eastern Kymenlaakso belongs to the historical region of Finnish Karelia, as the Kymi River served as the boundary between the Tavastians and the Karelians during the Middle Ages. However, the Karelian presence in this region during the Middle Ages was weak, and migration from western Finland during this time resulted in an ethnic composition more closely resembling that of western Finland, rather than North Karelia or South Karelia. This is evidenced by the fact that the dialect spoken in much of Kymenlaakso (the southeastern Tavastian dialect) is of western Finnish origin (albeit with Karelian characteristics). Miehikkälä and Virolahti are exceptions, as the South Karelian dialects are spoken in these municipalities.

== History ==
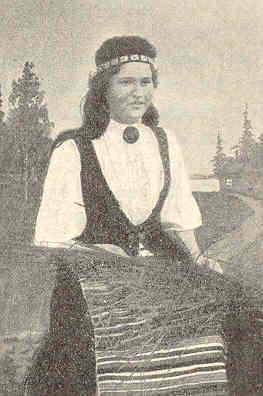
Jääski traditional costume.

Karelians are one of the three historical Finnish tribes, along with Finns proper and Tavastians. In addition to Karelia, they spread westwards to Savonia. The population of ancient Karelia was split into three in 1323 due to the Treaty of Nöteborg, when the region was divided between Sweden and Novgorod: the Karelians of the Viipuri region (i.e. "Swedish Karelia"), of Novgorod, and of Savonia. Those in Savonia were influenced by the Tavastians, eventually resulting in the formation of the Savonians. Novgorod Karelians received eastern influences from the Vepsians and the Russians, and adopted Eastern Orthodoxy. Their language started developing in a different direction, eventually resulting in the Karelian language. After the reformation, Karelians of Swedish Karelia became Lutherans, and their dialects are considered to belong to the Eastern Finnish dialect group.

In 1617, when the Treaty of Stolbovo was signed, the approximate region of modern-day North Karelia became part of Sweden. As a result, most of the Orthodox Karelians living there escaped to the Tver region of Russia. The area of North Karelia was later repopulated by Savonians. Between 1721–1812, South Karelia and the Karelian Isthmus were part of Russia. This resulted in different dialects being spoken in North and South Karelia, Savonian dialects in the north, and South Karelian dialects in the south.

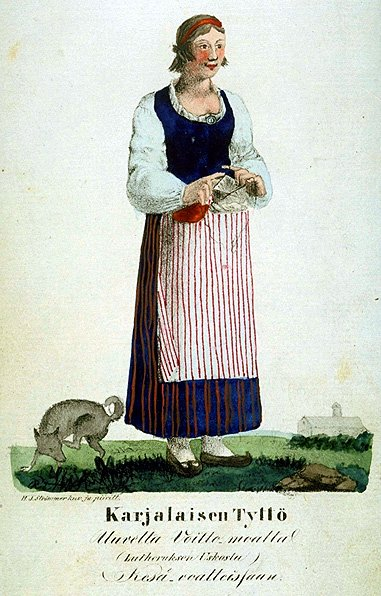
Lutheran Karelian girl in her summer clothes.

In the 18th century, a cultural movement known as Karelianism emerged among Finnish artists, poets, sculptors and authors. They saw Karelia as a region which had remained authentic and untouched, thus preserving the "Finnishness" in its purest state. Karelianists travelled to both Finnish Karelia and East Karelia, and created numerous works of art glorifying the nature and mysticism they saw in Karelia. This also resulted in the creation of Kalevala, Finland's national epic.

Following the Winter War, a portion of Finnish Karelia was ceded to the Soviet Union. Over 400,000 Karelians were evacuated to other parts of Finland following the cession, and their descendants are now spread across the country, many still maintaining Karelian identities.

== Dialect ==
The dialect spoken in South Karelia is part of the South Karelian dialects of the Finnish language. These dialects used to be spoken in the Karelian Isthmus and Ingria before World War II. The dialect that is spoken in North Karelia is considered to be one of the Savonian dialects.

== Identity ==
Karelians are known as hospitable and playful; a stereotype in large part created by Zacharias Topelius in his book Maamme kirja (1875). Before this, the stereotype of Karelians described them as close-minded and lazy. Karelia is also often known as the home of poetry and song, which is also reflected in the regional song of Finnish Karelia, Karjalaisten laulu, lit. 'Song of the Karelians'. Karelians have faced multiple hardships in history while developing a strong sense of identity. As a result the evacuations in the 1940s, they also live in a diaspora across Finland. Due to these factors, some, such as journalist Ilkka Malmberg and author Heikki Hietamies, have referred to Karelians as the "Jews of Finland". A study conducted by Suomen kulttuurirahasto and e2 in 2018 shows that 36% of those identifying as Karelians in Finland are not from Karelia, a percentage way higher than the equivalents with any other heimo. These descendants of the evacuees living in other parts of Finland still hold a connection to the Karelian identity through their families. Being Karelian was also the most popular "secondary heimo identity" in the country, which shows how widespread the Karelian identity is in Finland. Due to this, being Karelian has also been described as first and foremost a mental state. Karelians also often organize different events and celebrations for the Karelian identity, a custom which has become increasingly rare for any other heimo.
