= Värmland Savonian dialect =

Extinct Finnish dialect

Värmland Finnish
- Native to: Sweden, Norway
- Region: Värmland
- Ethnicity: Forest Finns
- Extinct: 1969, with the death of Karl Persson
- Language family: Uralic: Finnic; Finnish; Eastern Finnish dialects; Savonian dialects; Värmland Finnish

Language codes
- ISO 639-3: –
- Glottolog: None
- Värmland, where the dialect was spoken

The Värmland Finnish, or Värmland Savonian dialect (Finnish: Vermlannin savolaismurre) is an extinct Savonian dialect spoken in Värmland by the Forest Finns. However some speakers also lived in Norway.

In Savonian dialects, a vowel is inserted in the middle of the word talavi 'winter' (written Finnish "talvi"), however this feature is completely lacking from Värmland Finnish, which suggests it was a later development in Savonian.

== History ==
Savo Finnish speakers came to Sweden during the 1600s (mainly from Rautalampi). During the 1800s, there were thousands of Finnish speakers in Värmland. Unlike Savonian, the Värmland dialect did not have consonant gemination or the schwa, because they were later developments in the Savonian dialects spoken in Finland.

By the 1960s, only a few descendants of the original Savonians who had spoken Finnish as children remained. The last speakers of Värmland Savonian were Johansson-Oinoinen and Karl Persson, who died in 1965 and 1969.
