= Karelian dialects =

Karelian dialects may refer to:

- Dialects of the Karelian language
- South Karelian dialects of the Finnish language
