= Eastern Finnish dialects =

Group of dialects of Finnish

Eastern Finnish dialects are chiefly vested in the Savonians (the Savonian dialects) and the Karelians (the southeast Finnish dialects). One of the Finnish language spoken group, the North Karelian, represents the East Finnish dialects, however this distinction is not established in any case. Other dialects, such as the North Finnish dialects, are considered as East or West Finnish dialects. Kalevala, one of the earliest and most significant works of Finnish literature, was written in East Finnish and East Finnish features were used extensively in the Finnish language standardization.

There is less influence from Scandinavian and Finland-Swedish culture and language. The language is distinguished by vowel-diphthong shifts with respect to the standard language, and the use of palatalization. Epenthetic vowels are added after /l/, /h/ and sometimes /n/ in stressed syllable coda preceding a consonant (e.g. kylmä – kylymä), but this feature is not distinguishing, being also found commonly in most Western Finnish dialects.

== Subdivisions ==
- Savo Finnish (the Savonian dialects) . There are major differences between different Savo dialects. For example, North Savo has different personal pronouns from South Savo.
- Karelian Finnish (the southeast Finnish dialects)
- Some dialects of the Karelian language spoken within the former borders (1920 peace) are sometimes classified as "border Karelian dialects" (Raja-Karjalan murteet)
