= Momentane =

Verb aspect in Finnish grammar

In Finnish grammar, the momentane is a verb aspect indicating that an occurrence is sudden and short-lived.

Finnish has a number of momentane markers; they differ in the valency and voice of the verbs they produce, but all indicate sudden, short-lived occurrences; for example, the verb ammahtaa ('to dash ahead suddenly'; not said of a person) is an anticausative, momentane version of ampua ('to shoot'). Another example is the verb katsaista ('to take a quick look'), which is a momentane version of katsoa ('to look'). For semantic reasons, not all momentane markers can be used with all verbs; for example, an anticausative marker can only be used with verbs representing occurrences that can happen accidentally or on their own. Verbs with momentane markers are considered independent words, and native speakers rarely analyze them, but do synthesize them. Often the parent verb is not in use, leaving only the derived forms such as the momentane.

Often these are combined with a frequentative to indicate a series of short actions. For example:

heilua "to swing"
heilahtaa "to swing once by itself"
heilahdella "to swing to and fro continuously".

Another note is that the root may not be a fully formed verb, but mere onomatopoeia, e.g. pam+auttaa "to bang (something suddenly once)" or in frequentative form pam+autella "to bang (something suddenly multiple times)".

The markers are affected by consonant gradation, as illustrated by this pair of first infinitives vs. second-person indicatives: pamahtaa ~ pamahdat, pamauttaa ~ pamautat / pamautella ~ pamauttelet.

== See also ==
- Finnish grammar
- Linguistics
