= Frequentative =

Grammatical aspect that indicates repeated action over multiple occasions or places

In grammar, a frequentative form (abbreviated freq or fr) of a word indicates repeated action but is not to be confused with iterative aspect. The frequentative form can be considered a separate but not completely independent word called a frequentative. The frequentative is no longer productive in English, unlike in some language groups, such as Finno-Ugric, Balto-Slavic, and Turkic.

== English ==
English has -le and -er as frequentative suffixes. Some frequentative verbs surviving in English, and their parent verbs are listed below. Additionally, some frequentative verbs are formed by reduplication of a monosyllable (e.g., coo-cooing, cf. Latin murmur). Frequentative nouns are often formed by combining two different vowel grades of the same word (as in teeter-totter, pitter-patter, chitchat.)

frequentative	original	suffix
blabber	blab	-er
bobble	bob	-le
clamber	climb	-er
clutter	clot	-er
crackle	crack	-le
crumble	crumb	-le
cuddle	couth (ME. cudde, cuþþed, OE. cúð)	-le
curdle	curd	-le
dabble	dab	-le
dribble	drip	-le
draggle, bedraggled	drag	-le
dazzle	daze	-le
fizzle	fizz	-le
flitter	flit	-er
flutter	float	-er
fondle	fond	-le
glimmer	gleam	-er
gobble	gob	-le
gruntle, disgruntled	grunt	-le
haggle	hag = hew, hack	-le
jiggle	jig	-le
jostle	joust	-le
muddle	mud	-le
nestle	nest	-le
nuzzle	nose	-le
paddle	pad	-le
patter	pat	-er
prattle	prate	-le
prickle	prick	-le
pucker	pock, poke	-er
putter	put	-er
scuffle	scuff	-le
scuttle	scud	-le
slither	slide	-er
sniffle	sniff	-le
snuffle	snuff	-le
snuggle	snug	-le
sparkle	spark	-le
spatter	spit	-er
speckle	speck	-le
straddle	stride	-le
suckle	suck	-le
swaddle	swathe	-le
swagger	swag	-er
swindle	swindan (OE. cognate, 'to waste away')	-le
tickle	tick	-le
topple	top	-le
tousle	tease (apart)	-le
trample	tramp	-le
toggle	tug	-le
tumble	tumben (Middle English)	-le
twinkle	twink	-le
waddle	wade	-le
waggle	wag	-le
wrangle	wring	-le
wrestle	wrest	-le

== Finnish ==
In Finnish, a frequentative verb signifies a single action repeated, "around the place" both spatially and temporally. The complete translation would be "go — around aimlessly". There is a large array of different frequentatives, indicated by lexical agglutinative markers. In general, one frequentative is -:i-, and another -ele-, but it is almost always combined with something else. Some forms:

- sataa — sadella — satelee "to rain — to rain occasionally — it rains occasionally"
- ampua — ammuskella — ammuskelen "to shoot — go shooting around — I go shooting around"
- juosta — juoksennella — juoksentelen "to run — to run around (to and fro) — I run around"
- kirjoittaa — kirjoitella — kirjoittelen "to write — to write (something short) occasionally — I write "around""
- järjestää — järjestellä — järjestelen "to put in order — to arrange continuously, to play around — I play around (with them) in order to put them in order"
- heittää — heittelehtiä — heittelehdit "to throw — to swerve — you swerve"
- loikata — loikkia — loikin "to jump once — to jump (again and again) — I jump (again and again)"
- istua — istuksia — istuksit "to sit — to sit (randomly somewhere), loiter — you loiter there by sitting"

There are several frequentative morphemes, underlined above; these are affected by consonant gradation as indicated. Their meanings are slightly different; see the list, arranged infinitive~personal:

- -ella~-ele-: bare frequentative.
- -skella~-skele-: frequentative unergative verb, where the action is wanton (arbitrary)
- -stella~-stele-: frequentative causative, where the subject causes something indicated in the root, as "order" vs. "to continuously try to put something in order".
- -nnella~-ntele-: a frequentative, where an actor is required. The marker -nt- indicates a continuing effort, therefore -ntele- indicates a series of such efforts.
- -elehtia~-elehdi-: movement that is random and compulsive, as in under pain, e.g. vääntelehtiä "writhe in pain", or heittelehtiä "to swerve"
- -:ia-~-i-: a continuing action definitely at a point in time, where the action or effort is repeated.
- -ksia~-ksi-: same as -i-, but wanton, cf. -skella

Frequentatives may be combined with momentanes, that is, to indicate the repetition of a short, sudden action. The momentane -ahta- can be prefixed with the frequentative -ele- to produce the morpheme -ahtele-, as in täristä "to shake (continuously)" → tärähtää "to shake suddenly once" → tärähdellä "to shake, such that a single, sudden shaking is repeated". For example, the contrast between these is that ground shakes (maa tärisee) continuously when a large truck goes by, the ground shakes once (maa tärähtää) when a cannon fires, and the ground shakes suddenly but repeatedly (maa tärähtelee) when a battery of cannons is firing.

Since the frequentative is a lexical, not a grammatical contrast, considerable semantic drift may have occurred.

For a list of different real and hypothetical forms, see:

Loanwords are put into the frequentative form, if the action is such. If the action can be nothing else but frequentative, the "basic form" doesn't even exist, such as with "to go shopping".

- surffata — surffailla "to surf — to surf (around in the net)"
- *shopata — shoppailla "*to shop once — to go shopping"

Adjectives can similarly receive frequentative markers: iso — isotella "big — to talk big", or feikkailla < English fake "to be fake, blatantly and consistently".

== Greek ==
In Homer and Herodotus, there is a past frequentative, usually called "past iterative", with an additional -sk- suffix before the endings.

- ékhe-sk-on "I used to have" (imperfect ékh-on)

The same suffix is used in inchoative verbs in both Ancient Greek and Latin.

The infix may occur in the forms -σκ-, -ασκ-, and -εσκ-. Homer regularly omits the augment. The iterative occurs most often in the imperfect, but also in the aorist.

== Hungarian ==
In Hungarian it is quite common and everyday to use frequentative.

Frequentative verbs are formed with the suffix –gat (–get after a front vowel; see vowel harmony). Also there is a so-called Template rule, which forces another vowel in between the base verb and the affix resulting in a word containing at least three syllables. Verbal prefixes (coverbs) do not count as a syllable.

Some verbs' frequentative forms have acquired an independent non-frequentative meaning. In these cases the three syllables rule is not applied as the form is not considered a frequentative. These words can be affixed with –gat again to create a frequentative meaning.

In rare cases non-verbs can be affixed by –gat to give them similar modification in meaning as to verbs. In most cases these non-verbs are obviously related to some actions, like a typical outcome or object. The resulting word basically has the same meaning as if the related verb were affixed with –gat.

The change in meaning of a frequentative compared to the base can be different depending on the base: The –gat affix can modify the occurrences or the intensity or both of an action. Occasionally it produces a specific meaning which is related but distinct from the original form's.

Examples:

frequentative	root	translation of root	translation of –gat form	explanation
fizetget	fizet	to pay	paying for a longer period with probably less intensity	the vowel harmony forced -GAT to take form of -get
kéreget	kér	to ask	begging for a living	because the resulting word must be at least three syllables long a new vowel is added to the word: kér-e-get
kiütöget	(ki)üt	hit (out)	hit out sg. multiple times	the prefixed coverb "ki" (out) doesn't count as a syllable so an extra vowel is added: (ki)üt-ö-get
hallgatgat	hallgat	to listen	to listen multiple times but with possibly less intensity	the original verb "hallgat" (to listen) is a syntactically imperfect frequentative form of "hall" (to hear)
rángat	ránt	to hitch	to tousle	this one is kind of an exception for the three syllable rule, however "rántogat" (ránt-o-gat) is uncommon but valid, and has a slightly bigger emphasis on the separate nature of each pull rather than a continuous shaking as in "rángat"
jajgat	jaj	ouch (a shout)	to shout "jaj" multiple times, probably because of pain	the original word is not a verb, so the three syllable rule is not applied
béget	bee	baa (onomatopoeia for a sheep)	to shout baa multiple times	same as above
mosogat	mos	to wash	to do the dishes	the frequentative form (mos-o-gat) has its own non-frequentative meaning
mosogatgat	mosogat	to do the dishes	to do the dishes slowly and effortlessly	as the frequentative "mosogat" has a non-frequentative meaning, it can be affixed by -GAT to make it frequentative
dolgozgat	dolgozik	to work	to work with less effort and intensity, as in: "Ők fizetgetnek, én dolgozgatok" (They pretend to pay me, I pretend to work.)	the "-ik" at the end of "dolgozik" is an irregular ending which is only effective in third person singular, so -GAT sticks to "dolgoz" which is the root of the word

== Latin ==
In Latin, frequentative verbs indicate repeated or intense action. They are usually formed from the supine stem with -āre added.

- cantāre, '(continue to) sing' (< canere, 'sing a song'). (This frequentative form was used often enough that it displaced and drove the basal form into extinction in modern Romance languages.)
- cursāre 'run around' (< currere, 'run')
- dictāre 'dictate' (< dīcere, 'speak, say')
- dormītāre 'be drowsy, fall asleep' (< dormīre, 'sleep')
- iactāre, 'shake, disturb' (< iacere, 'throw, cast')
- pulsāre, 'beat' (< pellere, 'push')
- saltāre, 'dance, jump' (< salīre, 'leap')
- spectāre, 'watch' (< specere, more usually aspicere, 'take a look at')
- versāre, 'turn often, keep turning' (< vertere, 'turn')

The following, exceptionally, is 3rd conjugation:

- vīsere, 'look at attentively, visit' (< vidēre, 'see')

Occasionally, however, they are formed not from the supine but from the present stem with -itāre.

- agitāre, 'put into motion' (< agere, 'do, drive')
- clāmitāre, 'keep shouting' (< clāmāre, 'shout')
- habitāre, 'reside, dwell (somewhere)' (< habēre, 'have', in pre-classical times it also had a meaning of reside, dwell )
- minitārī, 'keep threatening' (< minārī, 'threaten')
- vocitāre, 'be wont to call' / 'keep calling' (< vocāre, 'call')

The following is irregular since the supine of nāre is nātum with a long ā:

- natāre, 'swim, float' (< nāre, 'swim, float')

A frequentative verb can be made doubly frequentative by adding -itāre to a supine:

- cursitāre 'run here and there' (< currere, 'run')
- dictitāre 'say often or emphatically' (< dīcere, 'speak, say')
- ventitāre, 'come frequently or repeatedly' (< venīre, 'come'; see Catullus 8, line 4)
- vīsitāre, 'visit' (< vidēre, 'see')

Some frequentative verbs have no simple form:

- gustāre, 'taste'
- hortārī, 'exhort'

== Lithuanian ==
Lithuanian has a past frequentative (or iterative), which serves to express a single action repeated in the past. Starting from the infinitive without –ti, it is formed by adding the invariant morpheme –dav– followed by the regular past tense suffix of the first conjugation. For instance, di̇̀rb·ti ("to work", a first-conjugation verb), whose plain past tense is di̇̀rb·au ("I worked" or "I have worked"), has a past iterative of di̇̀rb·dav·au ("I used to work"). The six intersections of person and number map onto five distinct frequentative endings; there is no morphological distinction of number in the third person, nor of conjugation class in general.

		di̇̀rbti ("to work")	norė́ti ("to want")	skaitýti ("to read")
1st person	singular	di̇̀rb·dav·au	norė́·dav·au	skaitý·dav·au
1st person	plural	di̇̀rb·dav·ome	norė́·dav·ome	skaitý·dav·ome
2nd person	singular	di̇̀rb·dav·ai	norė́·dav·ai	skaitý·dav·ai
2nd person	plural	di̇̀rb·dav·ote	norė́·dav·ote	skaitý·dav·ote
3rd person		di̇̀rb·dav·o	norė́·dav·o	skaitý·dav·o

The closest relatives of standard Lithuanian, Samogitian and Latvian, have no separate past tense to mark the iterative aspect; in its place, both instead express it by means of periphrasis: an auxiliary verb – liuobėti in Samogitian and mēgt in Latvian – occupies the syntactic centre of the verb phrase (subject to conjugation), relegating the main verb to trail it as an (invariant) infinitive complement.

Consider the following three translations of the English sentence "We used to read a lot."

- Lithuanian: Mes daug skaitydavome.
- Samogitian: Mes liuobiam daug skaitītė.
- Latvian: Mēs mēdzām daudz lasīt.

== Polish ==
In the Polish language, certain imperfective verbs ending in -ać denote repeated or habitual action.

- jeść (to eat) → jadać (to eat habitually)
- iść (to walk) → chadzać.
- widzieć (to see) → widywać
- pisać (to write) → pisywać
- czytać (to read) → czytywać

The interfix -yw- used to form many frequentative verbs has a different function for prefixed perfective verbs: it serves to create their imperfective equivalents. For instance, rozczytywać (to try to read something barely legible) is simply an imperfective equivalent of rozczytać (to succeed at reading something barely legible).

== Russian ==
In the Russian language, the frequentative form of verbs to denote a repeated or customary action is produced by inserting suffixes -ива-/-ыва-, -ва- or -а́-, often accompanied with a change in the root of the word (vowel alternation, change of the last root consonant) and stress shift.

- ви́деть (videt') "to see" → ви́дывать (vidyvat') "to see repeatedly"
- сиде́ть (sidet') "to sit" → си́живать (sizhivat')
- ходи́ть (xodit') "to walk" → ха́живать (xazhivat')
- носи́ть (nosit') "to wear" → на́шивать (nashivat')
- гла́дить (gladit') "to stroke" → погла́живать (poglazhivat')
- знать (znat') "to know" → знава́ть (znavat')
- есть (ject') "to eat" → еда́ть (jedat')
- писа́ть (pisat') "to write" → попи́сывать (popisyvat')

An interesting example is with the word брать (brat') "to take"; an archaic usage recorded among hunters, normally used in the past tense, in hunter's boasting: бирал, бирывал (biral, biryval) meaning "used to take (quite a few) trophies".

== Reduplication ==
The simplest way to produce a frequentative is reduplication, either of the entire word or of one of its phonemes. This is common in Austronesian languages such as Niuean, although reduplication also serves to pluralize and intensify nouns and adjectives.

== See also ==
- Continuous and progressive aspects
- Inchoative verb

== Sources ==
- Gildersleeve, B. L. (1895). Gildersleeve's Latin Grammar. Bolchazy-Carducci. ISBN 0-86516-477-0.
