= Daniel Juslenius =

Finnish writer and bishop (1676–1752)

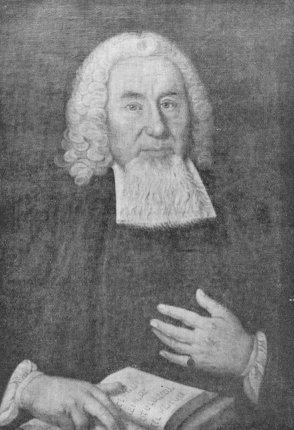
- Born: 10 June 1676; Mynämäki
- Died: 17 July 1752 (aged 76); Skara
- Known for: Finland's first Fennoman

Academic work
- Discipline: linguistics and theology
- Institutions: Royal Academy of Turku
- Notable works: Suomalaisen Sana-Lugun Coetus

Daniel Juslenius (10 June 1676, Mynämäki – 17 July 1752, Skara) was a Finnish writer and bishop. He was a professor of Hebrew, Greek and theology at the Royal Academy of Turku.

Juslenius is considered Finland's first Fennoman and a firm advocate of Finnishness. In his works, he presented completely overblown images of the past of the Finnish people. He wrote, for example, Aboa vetus et Nova ("Vanha ja uusi Turku", 1700, "The Old and New Turku"), in which he claimed that the civilisations of Rome and Ancient Greece originated in Finland. He also wrote Vindiciae Fennorum ("Suomalaisten puolustus", 1703, "The Defence of the Finns"). Both works represent homeland images which were fashionable to write about in the late 17th century. The purpose of this depiction was to make an inventory of the possessions during Sweden's time as a great power.

== Juslenius' picture of Finland ==
Juslenius derived the family roots of the Finns from the family of Magog in the Bible. According to him, the descendants of Magog migrated to Finland after the Deluge. This so-called tradition of Gothicismus aimed to provide a foundational myth for the people. It gave the people a feeling of genetic unity, and right to possession while living in their own country. Juslenius also believed that Finns are one of the Ten lost tribes of Israel.

Juslenius glorified Finland from all angles. He praised the excellent productivity of crops in the country and the civilised nature of the Finns. According to Juslenius, the Finns had invented their own writing system, even before the Romans. He used linguistics in his research, a typical method of his time. Among others, he explained the reputation of the Finns as being hakkapeliitta, brave soldiers, by deriving the term hakkaa päälle from a compound word:

The never-ending passion of the Finnish people to strike an enemy down forms a new word hakkapeliitta ('hakkaa päälle' means to strike, hit, bludgeon with all your might), with which Poland always trembled and the Austrians and the defenders of the Holy (if God allows us to say) League will end up in the grip of fear and will lose their lives.

According to Juslenius, words are not born in vain, in other words, without the presence of meaningful facts. If the Finns cried that they will strike their enemies once, they had to be one up in battle.

The firing up of his country leads us to think that his motivation would have been to glorify the image of Finland. For this reason, he is considered the first Fennoman of Finland. The works of Juslenius, however, were scholarly dissertations which complied with the requirements of academics of the time. The so-called method of dialectics was used in his research, this dialectic configuration counterpoint in the works of Juslenius came from the struggle of two images of Finland. Juslenius appeared to be an advocate of the Finns and he encountered appreciative foreigners on his imaginary soapbox. His mission was to eliminate all of the unfavourable claims against the Finnish people and prove the exact opposite. With the dialectic method, the subject and content were side factors in his research. It was more important to show his scholarliness by using Latin clearly and logically. Finland and its people were the subject of debate in a crowd of others.

== Juslenius as a linguist and clergyman ==
Juslenius was an expert in linguistics. His inaugural presentation for the position as language professor in 1712 dealt with the relationship of Finnish with Hebrew and Greek (De convenientia lingvae Fennicae cum Hebraea et Graeca). Juslenius' interest in language led him to create the first extensive Finnish-language dictionary Suomalaisen Sana-Lugun Coetus, which was published in 1745, it was the first dictionary to have Finnish as the reference language and contains 16,000 lexical entries. Juslenius was also bishop of the Church of Sweden in Porvoo (Borgå) (1735–1742) and in Skara (1744–1752).

In 1975, a new building at the University of Turku was named Juslenia after Daniel Juslenius.
