= Suomalaisen Sana-Lugun Coetus =

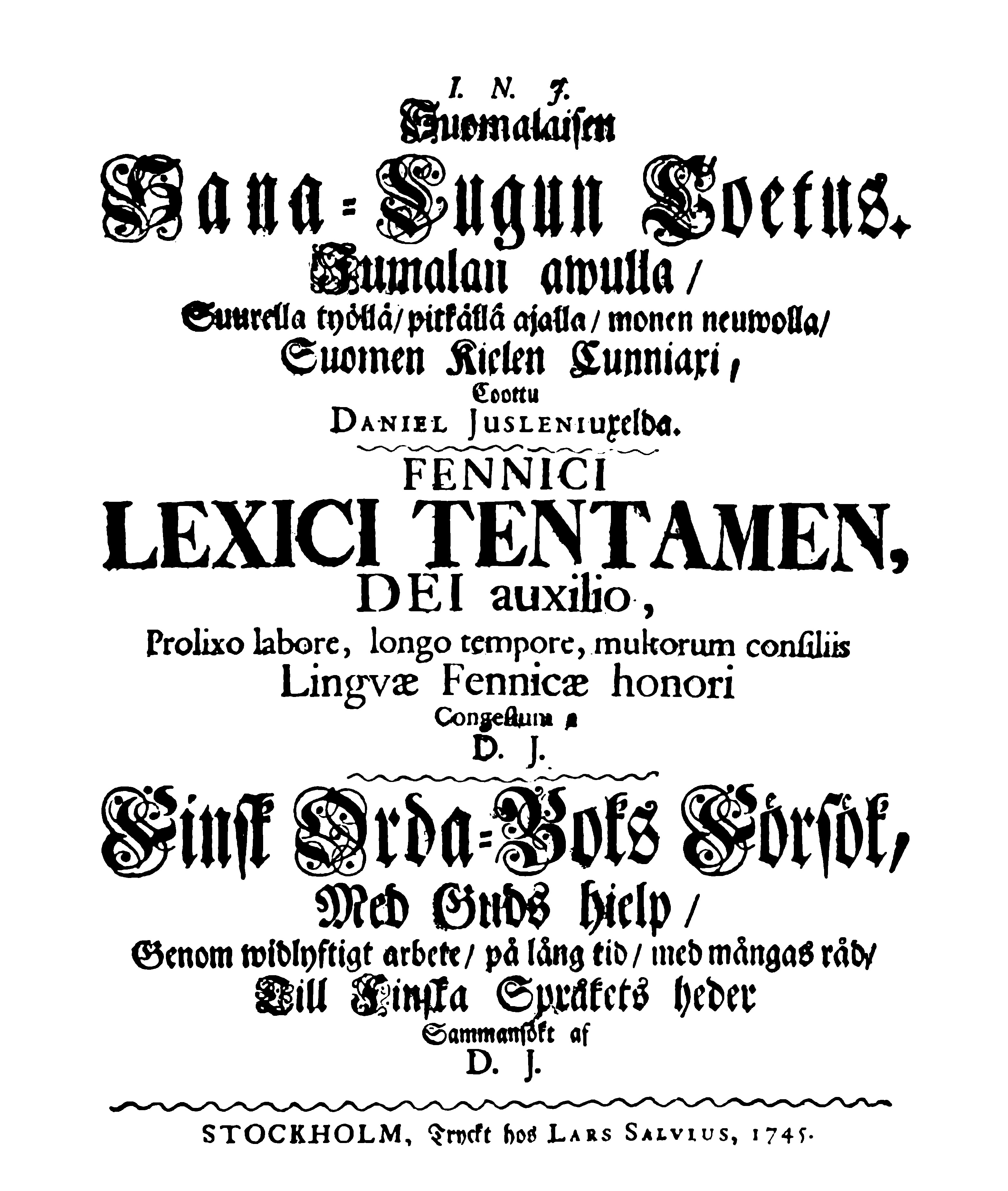
Suomalaisen Sana-Lugun Coetus

Suomalaisen Sana-Lugun Coetus (1745) by Daniel Juslenius was the first comprehensive dictionary of the Finnish language. It contains about 16 000 words of the Finnish language, at the end of which is a Swedish list of words. The dictionary contains a lot of artificial neologisms from the 18th century.

== Reprints ==
The dictionary was republished in 1917 by Salomon Kreander and Juhana Canstrén and edited by A. V. Koskimies. A facsimile of the dictionary was published in 1968.
