= Finnish language =

Finnic language

Finnish
- suomi, suomen kieli
- Pronunciation: IPA: [ˈsuo̯mi], [ˈsuo̯meŋ ˈkie̯li]
- Native to: Finland, Sweden, Russia, Norway
- Ethnicity: Finns
- Native speakers: 5.0 million Finland: 4.75 million (2023); Sweden: 200000–250000 (2022); Russia (Karelia): 8,500; US: 26,000 (2020)
- Language family: Uralic: Finnic; Northern Finnic; Finnish
- Dialects: Southwest; Tavastian; South Ostrobothnian; Central and Northern Ostrobothnian; Peräpohjola; Savonian; South Karelian; Siberian Finnish; Helsinki slang; Sweden Finnish; Fingelska
- Writing system: Latin (Finnish alphabet); Finnish Braille

Official status
- Official language in: Finland; European Union; Nordic Council
- Recognised minority language in: Karelia (Russia); Sweden
- Regulated by: Language Planning Department of the Institute for the Languages of Finland

Language codes
- ISO 639-1: fi
- ISO 639-2: fin
- ISO 639-3: fin
- Glottolog: nucl1717
- Linguasphere: 41-AAA-a
- Areas where Finnish and related languages Kven and Meänkieli are spoken by the majority (dark blue) or a significant minority (teal)

Finnish (endonym: suomi [ˈsuo̯mi] or suomen kieli [ˈsuo̯meŋ ˈkie̯li]) is a Finnic language of the Uralic language family, spoken by the majority of the population in Finland and by ethnic Finns outside of Finland. Finnish is one of the two official languages of Finland, alongside Swedish. In Sweden, both Finnish and Meänkieli (which has significant mutual intelligibility with Finnish) are official minority languages. Kven, which like Meänkieli is mutually intelligible with Finnish, is spoken in the Norwegian counties of Troms and Finnmark by a minority of Finnish descent. However, these are recognized as independent languages in their relative countries for sociohistorical reasons.

Finnish is typologically agglutinative and uses almost exclusively suffixal affixation. Nouns, adjectives, pronouns, numerals and verbs are inflected depending on their role in the sentence. Sentences are normally formed with subject–verb–object word order, although the extensive use of inflection allows them to be ordered differently. Word order variations are often reserved for differences in information structure. Finnish orthography uses a Latin-script alphabet derived from the Swedish alphabet, and is phonemic to a great extent. Vowel length and consonant length are distinguished, and there are a range of diphthongs, although vowel harmony limits which diphthongs are possible.

== Classification ==
Finnish belongs to the Finnic branch of the Uralic language family; as such, it is one of the few European languages that is not Indo-European. The Finnic branch also includes Estonian and a few minority languages spoken around the Baltic Sea and in Russia's Republic of Karelia. The closest relative of Finnish is either Ingrian, or depending on the definition, Karelian. Finnic languages form a dialect continuum, where for instance Finnish and Estonian are not separated by any single isogloss that would separate dialects considered "Finnish" from those considered "Estonian", despite the two standard languages being not mutually intelligible.

Finnish demonstrates an affiliation with other Uralic languages (such as Hungarian and Sami languages) in several respects including:

- Shared morphology:
  - case suffixes such as genitive -n, partitive -(t)a / -(t)ä ( < Proto-Uralic *-ta, originally ablative), essive -na / -nä ( < *-na, originally locative)
  - plural markers -t and -i- ( < Proto-Uralic *-t and *-j, respectively)
  - possessive suffixes such as 1st person singular -ni ( < Proto-Uralic *-n-mi), 2nd person singular -si ( < Proto-Uralic *-ti).
  - various derivational suffixes (e.g. causative -tta/-ttä < Proto-Uralic *-kta)
- Shared basic vocabulary displaying regular sound correspondences with the other Uralic languages (e.g. kala 'fish' ~ North Saami guolli ~ Hungarian hal; and kadota 'disappear' ~ North Saami guođđit ~ Hungarian hagy 'leave (behind)'.

Several theories exist as to the geographic origin of the most recent common ancestor of Finnish and the other Uralic languages (Proto-Uralic). The most widely held view is that it originated somewhere in the boreal forest belt around the Ural Mountains region and/or the bend of the middle Volga. The strong case for Proto-Uralic is supported by common vocabulary with regularities in sound correspondences, as well as by the fact that the Uralic languages have many similarities in structure and grammar. Despite having overlapping geographical distributions, Finnic languages and Sami languages are not closely related, and the hypothesis of a separate taxonomic "Finno-Samic" node is controversial.

The Defense Language Institute in Monterey, California, United States, classifies Finnish as a level III language (of four levels) in terms of learning difficulty for native English speakers.

== Geographic distribution ==
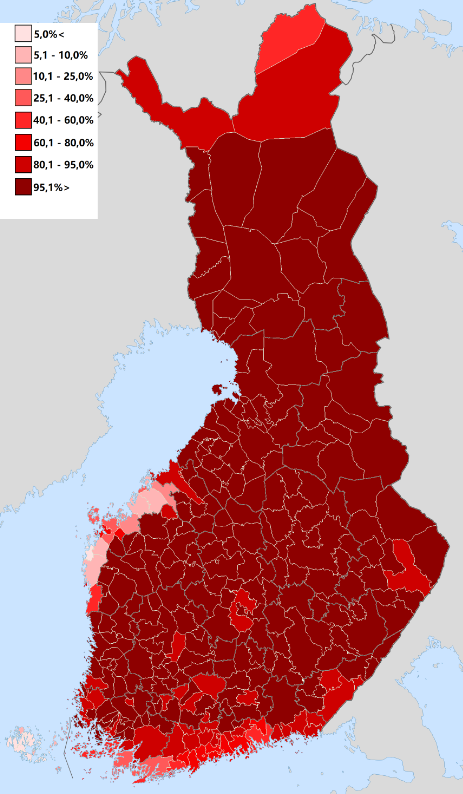
Share of Finnish speakers in the population of municipalities of Finland in 2020.

Areas in Central and Southern Sweden with a Finnish-speaking population (2005)

Finnish is spoken by about five million people, most of whom reside in Finland. There are also notable Finnish-speaking minorities in Sweden, Norway, Russia, Estonia, Brazil, Canada, and the United States. The majority of the population of Finland (90.37% as of 2010) speak Finnish as their first language. The remainder speak Swedish (5.42%), one of the Sámi languages (for example Northern, Inari, or Skolt), or another language as their first language. Finnish is spoken as a second language in Estonia by about 167,000 people. The Finnic varieties found in Norway's Finnmark (namely Kven) and in northern Sweden (namely Meänkieli) have the status of official minority languages, and thus can be considered distinct languages from Finnish. However, since these languages are mutually intelligible, one may alternatively view them as dialects of the same language.

No language census exists for Norway, neither for Kven, standard Finnish, or combined. As of 2023, 7,454 first- or second-generation immigrants from Finland were registered as having Norwegian residency, while as of 2021, 235 Finns were registered as foreigners studying at Norwegian higher education. Great Norwegian Encyclopedia estimates Kven speakers at 2,000-8,000. Altogether, this results in a total amount of Finnish-speakers roughly between 7,200 and 15,600.

In the latest census, around 1000 people in Russia claimed to speak Finnish natively; however, a larger amount of 14,000 claimed to be able to speak Finnish in total.

There are also forms of Finnish spoken by diasporas outside Europe, such as American Finnish, spoken by Finnish Americans, and Siberian Finnish, spoken by Siberian Finns.

== Official status ==
Today, Finnish is one of two official languages of Finland (the other being Swedish), and has been an official language of the European Union since 1995.

Finnish also enjoys the status of an official minority language in Sweden. Under the Nordic Language Convention, citizens of the Nordic countries speaking Finnish have the opportunity to use their native language when interacting with official bodies in other Nordic countries without being liable to any interpretation or translation costs. However, concerns have been expressed about the future status of Finnish in Sweden, for example, where reports produced for the Swedish government during 2017 show that minority language policies are not being respected, particularly for the 7% of Finns settled in the country.

== History ==
=== Prehistory ===
The Uralic family of languages, of which Finnish is a member, are hypothesized to derive from a single ancestor language termed Proto-Uralic, spoken sometime between 8,000 and 2,000 BCE (estimates vary) in the vicinity of the Ural Mountains. Over time, Proto-Uralic split into various daughter languages, which themselves continued to change and diverge, yielding yet more descendants. One of these descendants is the reconstructed Proto-Finnic, from which the Finnic languages developed.

Current models assume that three or more Proto-Finnic dialects evolved during the first millennium BCE. These dialects were defined geographically, and were distinguished from one another along a north–south split as well as an east–west split. The northern dialects of Proto-Finnic, from which Finnish developed, lacked the mid vowel [ɤ]. This vowel was found only in the southern dialects, which developed into Estonian, Livonian, and Votian. The northern variants used third person singular pronoun hän instead of southern tämä (Est. tema). While the eastern dialects of Proto-Finnic (which developed in the modern-day eastern Finnish dialects, Veps, Karelian, and Ingrian) formed genitive plural nouns via plural stems (e.g., eastern Finnish kalojen < *kaloi-ten), the western dialects of Proto-Finnic (today's Estonian, Livonian and western Finnish varieties) used the non-plural stems (e.g., Est. kalade < *kala-ten). Another defining characteristic of the east–west split was the use of the reflexive suffix -(t)te, used only in the eastern dialects.

=== Medieval period ===
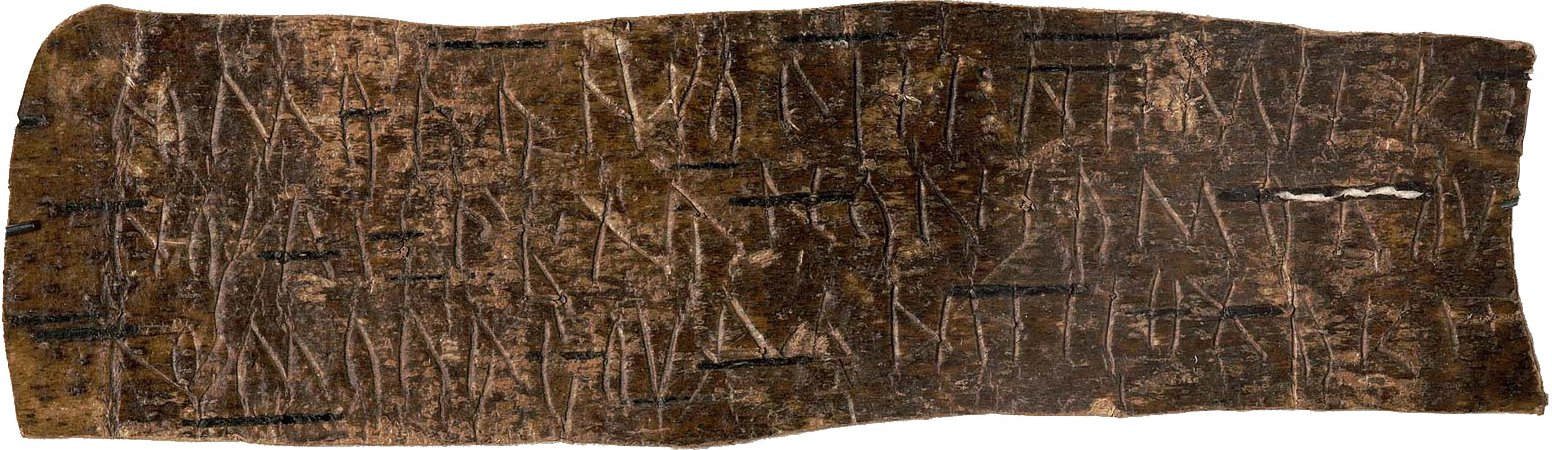
Birch bark letter no. 292 is the oldest known document in any Finnic language.

The Birch bark letter no. 292 from the early 13th century is the first known document in any Finnic language; it is written in a variety that is closest to modern Karelian or Veps. The first known written example of Finnish itself is found in a German travel journal dating back to c. 1450: Mÿnna tachton gernast spuho sommen gelen Emÿna daÿda (Modern Finnish: "Minä tahdon kernaasti puhua suomen kielen, [mutta] en minä taida;" English: "I want to speak Finnish, [but] I am not able to"). According to the travel journal, the words are those of a Finnish bishop whose name is unknown. The erroneous use of gelen (Modern Finnish kielen) in the accusative case, rather than kieltä in the partitive, and the lack of the conjunction mutta are typical of foreign speakers of Finnish even today. At the time, most priests in Finland spoke Swedish.

During the Middle Ages, when Finland was under Swedish rule, Finnish was only spoken. At the time, the language of international commerce was Middle Low German, the language of administration Swedish, and religious ceremonies were held in Latin. This meant that Finnish speakers could use their mother tongue only in everyday life. Finnish was considered inferior to Swedish, and Finnish speakers were second-class members of society because they could not use their language in any official situations. There were even efforts to reduce the use of Finnish through parish clerk schools, the use of Swedish in church, and by having Swedish-speaking servants and maids move to Finnish-speaking areas.

=== Writing system ===
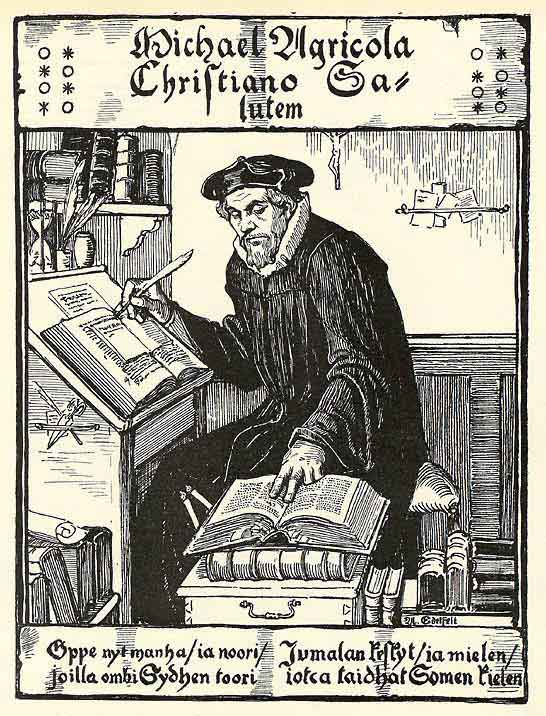
Mikael Agricola, a 19th-century drawing by Albert Edelfelt

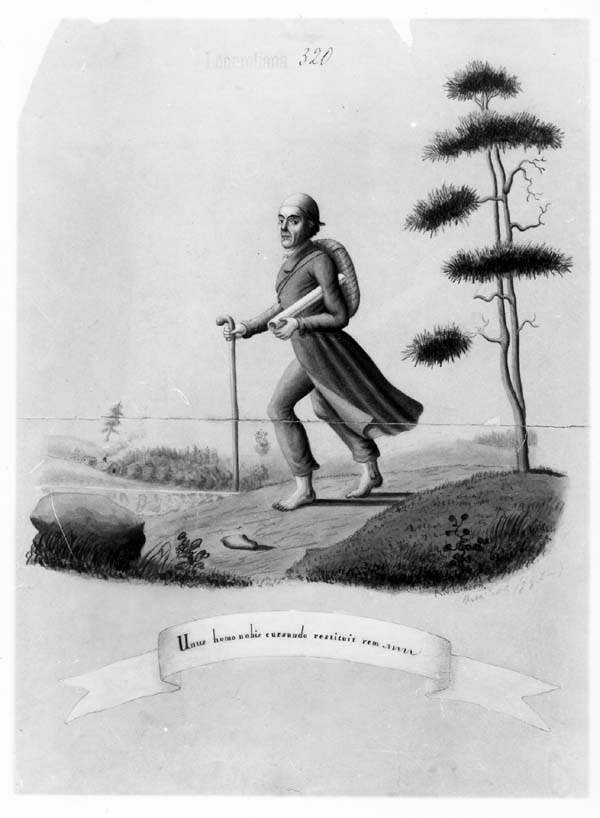
Elias Lönnrot as depicted in a 19th-century caricature – Lönnrot made several journeys to Karelia and Eastern Finland to collect folklore, from which he compiled the Kalevala.

The first comprehensive writing system for Finnish was created by Mikael Agricola, a Finnish bishop, in the 16th century. He based his writing system on the western dialects. Agricola's ultimate plan was to translate the Bible, but first he had to develop an orthography for the language, which he based on Swedish, German, and Latin. The Finnish standard language still relies on his innovations with regard to spelling, though Agricola used less systematic spelling than is used today.

Though Agricola's intention was that each phoneme (and allophone under qualitative consonant gradation) should correspond to one letter, he failed to achieve this goal in various respects. For example, k, c, and q were all used for the phoneme /k/. Likewise, he alternated between dh and d to represent the allophonic [ð] (like th in English this), between dh and z to represent /θː/ (like th in thin, but longer in duration), and between gh and g to represent the allophonic [ɣ]. Agricola did not consistently represent vowel length in his orthography.

Others revised Agricola's work later, striving for a more systematic writing system. Along the way, Finnish lost several fricative consonants in a process of sound change. The sounds [ð] and [θ(ː)] disappeared from the language, surviving only in a small rural region in Western Finland. In the standard language, however, the effect of the lost sounds is thus:

- [ð] became [d]. The sound [ð] was written ⟨d⟩ or ⟨dh⟩ by Agricola. This sound was lost from most varieties of Finnish, either losing all phonetic realization or being pronounced as [r], [ɾ], [l], or [h] instead (depending on dialect and the position in the word). However, Agricola's spelling ⟨d⟩ prevailed, and the pronunciation in Standard Finnish became [d] through spelling pronunciation.
- [θː, θ] became [ts]. These interdental fricatives were written as ⟨tz⟩ (for both grades: geminate and short) in some of the earliest written records. Though these developed into a variety of other sounds depending on dialect ([tː, t], [ht, h], [ht, t], [sː, s], [tː, tː], or [ht, ht]), the standard language has arrived at spelling pronunciation [ts] (which is treated as a consonant cluster and hence not subject to consonant gradation).
- [ɣ] became:
  - [ʋ] if it appeared originally between high round vowels [u] and [y] (cf. suku 'kin, family' : suvun [genitive form] from earlier *suku : *suɣun, and kyky : kyvyn 'ability, skill' [nominative and genitive, respectively] from *kükü : *küɣün, contrasting with sika : sian 'pig, pork' [nominative and genitive] from *sika : *siɣan. A similar process explains the /f/ pronunciation for some English words with "gh", such as "tough"),
  - [j] between a liquid consonant [l] or [r] and a vowel [e] (like in kuljen 'I go', a form of the verb kulkea 'to go' that was originally *kulɣen),
  - and otherwise it was lost entirely.

Modern Finnish punctuation, along with that of Swedish, uses the colon (:) to separate the stem of a word and its grammatical ending in some cases, for example after acronyms, as in EU:ssa 'in the EU'. (This contrasts with some other alphabetic writing systems, which would use other symbols, such as e.g. apostrophe, hyphen.) Since suffixes play a prominent role in the language, this use of the colon is quite common.

=== Modernization ===
In the 19th century Johan Vilhelm Snellman and others began to stress the need to improve the status of Finnish. Ever since the days of Mikael Agricola, written Finnish had been used almost exclusively in religious contexts, but now Snellman's Hegelian nationalistic ideas of Finnish as a fully-fledged national language gained considerable support. Concerted efforts were made to improve the status of the language and to modernize it, and by the end of the century Finnish had become a language of administration, journalism, literature, and science in Finland, along with Swedish.

The Finnish language did not have an official status in the country during the period of Swedish rule, which ended in 1809. After the establishment of the Grand Duchy of Finland, and against the backdrop of the Fennoman movement, the language gained official standing through the Language Rescript of 1863, an imperial decree issued in the same year as the first Diet since 1809.

In 1853 Daniel Europaeus published the first Swedish-Finnish dictionary, and between 1866 and 1880 Elias Lönnrot compiled the first Finnish-Swedish dictionary. In the same period, Antero Warelius conducted ethnographic research and, among other topics, he documented the geographic distribution of the Finnish dialects.

The most important contributions to improving the status of Finnish were made by Elias Lönnrot. His impact on the development of modern vocabulary in Finnish was particularly significant. In addition to compiling the Kalevala, he acted as an arbiter in disputes about the development of standard Finnish between the proponents of western and eastern dialects, ensuring that the western dialects preferred by Agricola retained their preeminent role, while many originally dialect words from Eastern Finland were introduced to the standard language, thus enriching it considerably. The first novel written in Finnish (and by a Finnish speaker) was Seven Brothers (Seitsemän veljestä), published by Aleksis Kivi in 1870.

== Dialects ==
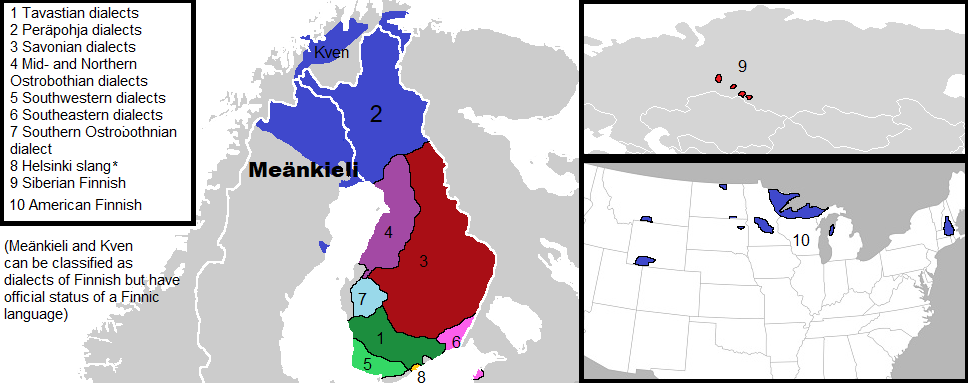
Map of Finnish dialects and forms of speech

The dialects of Finnish are divided into two distinct groups, Western and Eastern. The dialects are largely mutually intelligible and are distinguished from each other by changes in vowels, diphthongs and rhythm, as well as in preferred grammatical constructions. For the most part, the dialects operate on the same phonology and grammar. There are only marginal examples of sounds or grammatical constructions specific to some dialect and not found in standard Finnish. Two examples are the voiced dental fricative found in the Rauma dialect, and the Eastern exessive case.

=== Western dialects ===
The Southwest Finnish dialects (lounaissuomalaismurteet) are spoken in Southwest Finland and Satakunta. Their typical feature is abbreviation of word-final vowels, and in many respects they resemble Estonian. The Tavastian dialects (hämäläismurteet) are spoken in Tavastia. They are closest to the standard language, but feature some slight vowel changes, such as the opening of diphthong-final vowels (tie → tiä, miekka → miakka, kuolisi → kualis), the change of d to l (mostly obsolete) or trilled r (widespread, nowadays disappearance of d is popular) and the personal pronouns (me: meitin ('we: our'), te: teitin ('you: your') and he: heitin ('they: their')). The South Ostrobothnian dialects (eteläpohjalaismurteet) are spoken in Southern Ostrobothnia. Their most notable feature is the pronunciation of "d" as a tapped or even fully trilled /r/. The Central and North Ostrobothnian dialects (keski- ja pohjoispohjalaismurteet) are spoken in Central and Northern Ostrobothnia. The Lapland dialects (lappilaismurteet) are spoken in Lapland. The dialects spoken in the western parts of Lapland are recognizable by retention of old "h" sounds in positions where they have disappeared from other dialects.

One form of speech related to Northern dialects, Meänkieli, which is spoken on the Swedish side of the border is recognized in Sweden as its own distinct language, having its own standardized language separate from Finnish. This form of speech developed from the border created between Sweden and Finland in 1809 when the Russian Empire annexed Finland. This caused the speakers of Meänkieli to be isolated from the developments of standard Finnish and instead be influenced by the Swedish language. However, it is still mutually intelligible with Finnish, and is thus sometimes considered a dialect of the Finnish language.

The Kven language is spoken in Finnmark and Troms, in Norway. Its speakers are descendants of Finnish emigrants to the region in the 18th and 19th centuries. Kven is an official minority language in Norway.

=== Eastern dialects ===
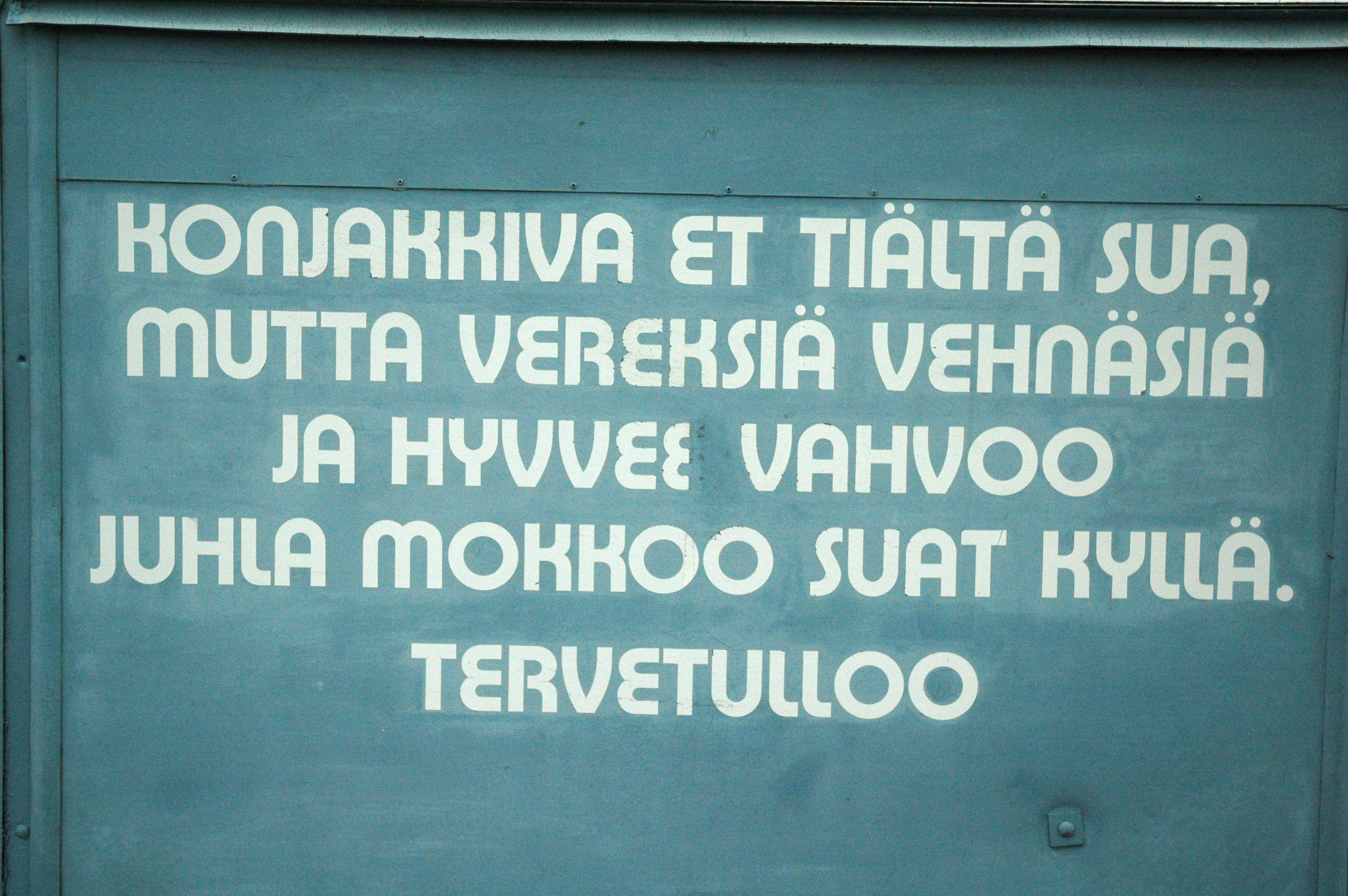
A sign in Savonian dialect: "You don't get cognac here, but fresh wheat buns and good strong Juhla Mokka-brand coffee you will have. Welcome."

The Eastern dialects consist of the widespread Savonian dialects (savolaismurteet) spoken in Savo and nearby areas, and the South-Eastern dialects now spoken only in Finnish South Karelia. The South Karelian dialects (eteläkarjalaismurteet) were previously also spoken on the Karelian Isthmus and in Ingria. The Karelian Isthmus was evacuated during World War II and refugees were resettled all over Finland. Most Ingrian Finns were deported to various interior areas of the Soviet Union.

Palatalization, a common feature of Uralic languages, had been lost in the Finnic branch, but it has been reacquired by most of these languages, including Eastern Finnish, but not Western Finnish. In Finnish orthography, this is denoted with a "j", e.g. vesj [vesʲ] "water", cf. standard vesi [vesi].

Although classified as a Finnish dialect, Savonian was recognized in a municipal decision as an official "language" of the region of Rautavaara in 2026, with the municipality also encouraging talks concerning the possible prerequisites or conditions of recognizing Savonian as an official minority language of Finland.

=== Helsinki slang (Stadin slangi) ===
”Bunkkerissa skabaa, skulaa, futaa gimmat, kundit” (In the bunker, there's compete, playing, football, girls, guys) – A sign written in Stadin slang

The first known written account in Helsinki slang is from the 1890 short story Hellaassa by young Santeri Ivalo (words that do not exist in, or deviate from, the standard spoken Finnish of its time are in bold):

Kun minä eilen illalla palasin labbiksesta, tapasin Aasiksen kohdalla Supiksen, ja niin me laskeusimme tänne Espikselle, jossa oli mahoton hyvä piikis. Mutta me mentiin Studikselle suoraan Hudista tapaamaan, ja jäimme sinne pariksi tunniksi, kunnes ajoimme Kaisikseen.

=== Dialect chart of Finnish ===
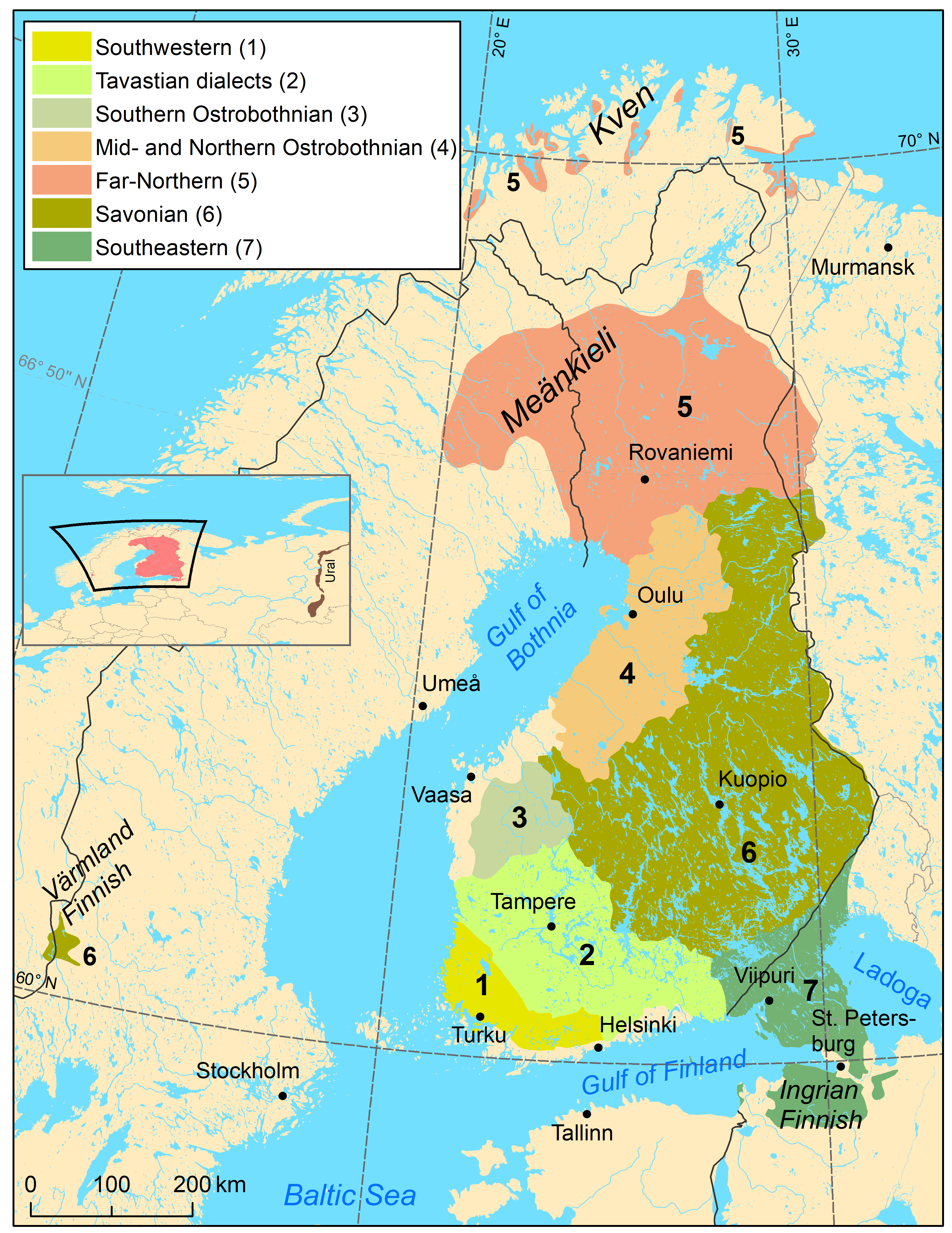
Traditional Finnish dialect areas before World War I

- **Finnish dialects**
  - **Western dialects**
    - Southwest Finnish dialects
      - Proper Finnish dialects
        - Northern dialect group
        - Southern dialect group
      - Southwest Finnish middle dialects
        - Pori region dialects
        - Ala-Satakunta dialects
        - dialects of Turku highlands
        - Somero region dialects
        - Western Uusimaa dialects
    - Helsinki slang
    - Tavastian Dialects
      - Ylä-Satakunta dialects
      - Heart Tavastian dialects
      - Southern Tavastian dialects
      - Southern-Eastern Tavastian dialects
        - Hollola dialect group
        - Porvoo dialect group
        - Iitti dialect group
    - South Ostrobothnian dialects
    - Central and North Ostrobothnian dialects
      - Central Ostrobothnian dialects
      - North Ostrobothnian dialects
    - Peräpohjola dialects
      - Torne dialects ("Meänkieli" in Sweden)
      - Kemi dialects
      - Kemijärvi dialects
      - Gällivare dialects ("Meänkieli" in Sweden)
      - Finnmark dialects ("Kven language" in Northern Norway)
  - **Eastern dialects**
    - Savonian dialects
      - North Savonian dialects
      - South Savonian dialects
      - Middle dialects of Savonlinna region
      - East Savonian dialects or North Karelian dialects
      - Kainuu dialects
      - Central Finland dialects
      - Päijänne Tavastia dialects
      - Keuruu-Evijärvi dialects
      - Savonian dialects of Värmland (Värmland, Sweden and Innlandet, Norway; extinct)
    - South Karelian dialects
      - Proper South Karelian dialects
      - Middle dialects of Lemi region
      - Dialects of Ingria (in Russia)

== Linguistic registers ==
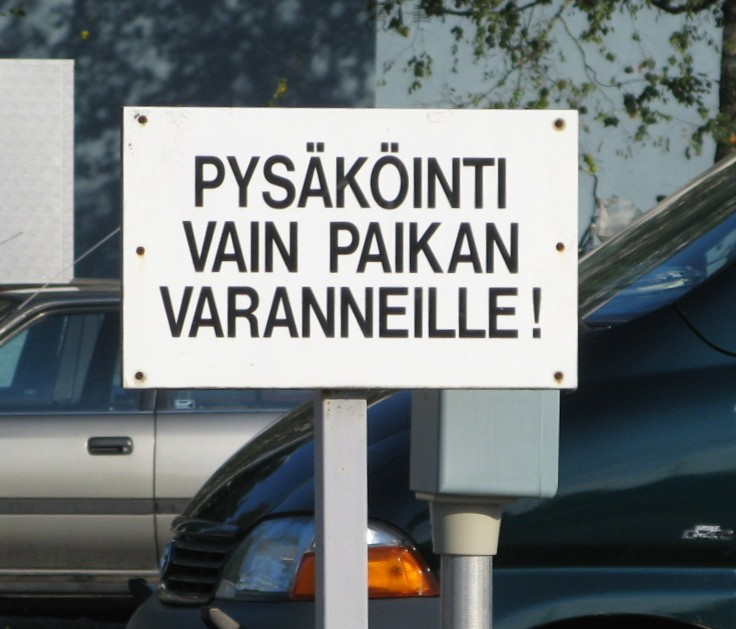
Example of a participle construction; the sign says: "Parking for reserved spaces only."

There are two main registers of Finnish used throughout the country. One is the "standard language" (yleiskieli), and the other is the "spoken language" (puhekieli). The standard language is used in formal situations like political speeches and newscasts. Its written form, the "book language" (kirjakieli), is used in nearly all written texts, not always excluding even the dialogue of common people in popular prose. The spoken language, on the other hand, is the main variety of Finnish used in popular TV and radio shows and at workplaces, and may be preferred to a dialect in personal communication.

=== Standardization ===
Standard Finnish is prescribed by the Language Office of the Research Institute for the Languages of Finland and is the language used in official communication. The Dictionary of Contemporary Finnish (Nykysuomen sanakirja 1951–61), with 201,000 entries, was a prescriptive dictionary that defined official language. An additional volume for words of foreign origin (Nykysuomen sivistyssanakirja, 30,000 entries) was published in 1991. An updated dictionary, The New Dictionary of Modern Finnish (Kielitoimiston sanakirja) was published in an electronic form in 2004 and in print in 2006. A descriptive grammar (the Large grammar of Finnish, Iso suomen kielioppi, 1,600 pages) was published in 2004. There is also an etymological dictionary, Suomen sanojen alkuperä, published in 1992–2000, and a handbook of contemporary language (Nykysuomen käsikirja). Standard Finnish is used in official texts and is the form of language taught in schools. Its spoken form is used in political speech, newscasts, in courts, and in other formal situations. Nearly all publishing and printed works are in standard Finnish.

=== Colloquial Finnish ===
As is common among languages with a long-standing standardized form, general Finnish show signs of certain commonplace supradialectal colloquial forms. For example, irregular verbs have developed in the spoken language as a result of the elision of sonorants in some verbs of the Type III class (with subsequent vowel assimilation), but only when the second syllable of the word is short. The result is that some forms in the spoken language are shortened, e.g. tule-n → tuu-n ('I come'), while others remain identical to the standard language hän tulee "he comes", never *hän tuu). However, the longer forms such as tule can be used in spoken language in other forms as well.

A prominent example of the effect of the standard language is the development of the consonant gradation form /ts : ts/ as in metsä : metsän, as this pattern was originally (1940) found natively only in the dialects of the southern Karelian isthmus and Ingria. It has been reinforced by the spelling "ts" for the dental fricative [θː], used earlier in some western dialects. The spelling and the pronunciation this encourages however approximate the original pronunciation, still reflected in e.g. Karelian /čč : č/ (meččä : mečän). In the spoken language, a fusion of Western /tt : tt/ (mettä : mettän) and Eastern /ht : t/ (mehtä : metän) has resulted in /tt : t/ (mettä : metän). Neither of these forms are identifiable as, or originate from, a specific dialect.

The orthography of informal language follows that of the formal. However, in signalling the former in writing, syncope and sandhi – especially internal – may occasionally amongst other characteristics be transcribed, e.g. menenpä → me(n)empä.

=== Examples ===
formal language	colloquial language	meaning	notes
hän menee he menevät	se menee ne menee	"he/she goes" "they go"	loss of an animacy contrast in pronouns (ne and se are inanimate in the formal language), and loss of a number contrast on verbs in the 3rd person (menee is 3rd person singular in the formal language)
minä, minun, ...	mä(ä)/mie, mun/miun, ...	"I, my, ..."	various alternative, usually shorter, forms of 1st and 2nd person pronouns
(minä) tulen (minä) olen	mä tuun mä oon	"I'm coming" or "I will come" "I am" or "I will be"	elision of sonorants before short vowels in certain Type III verbs along with vowel assimilation, and no pro-drop (i.e., personal pronouns are usually mandatory in the colloquial language)
onko teillä eikö teillä ole	o(n)ks teil(lä) e(i)ks teil(lä) oo	"do you (pl.) have?" "don't you (pl.) have (it)?"	vowel apocope and common use of the clitic -s in interrogatives (compare eiks to standard Estonian confirmatory interrogative eks)
(me) emme sano	me ei sanota	"we don't say" or "we won't say"	the passive voice is used in place of the first person plural
(minun) kirjani	mun kirja	"my book"	lack of possessive clitics on nouns
(minä) en tiedä syödä	mä en ti(i)ä syyä	"I don't know" "to eat"	elision of [d] between vowels, and subsequent vowel assimilation (compare mä en ti(i)ä to standard Estonian ma ei tea or dialectal forms ma ei tia or ma ei tie)
kuusikymmentäviisi	kuuskyt(ä)viis	"sixty-five"	abbreviated forms of numerals
punainen ajoittaa	punane(n) ajottaa	"red" "to time"	unstressed diphthongs ending in /i/ become short vowels, and apocope of phrase-final -n
korjannee	kai korjaa	"probably will fix"	absence of the potential mood, use of kai 'probably' instead

== Phonology ==
=== Segmental phonology ===
The phoneme inventory of Finnish is moderately small, with a great number of vocalic segments and a restricted set of consonant types, both of which can be long or short.

==== Vocalic segments ====
Finnish monophthongs show eight vowel qualities that contrast in duration. Vowel allophony is quite restricted. All vowels are possible in both initial and non-initial syllables, whether long or short. Long and short vowels are shown below.

	Front				Back	
	unrounded		rounded		Back	
	short	long	short	long	short	long
Close	i	iː	y	yː	u	uː
Mid	e̞	e̞ː	ø̞	ø̞ː	o̞	o̞ː
Open	æ	æː			ɑ	ɑː

The quality of long vowels mostly overlaps with the quality of short vowels, with the exception of u, which is centralized with respect to uu; long vowels do not morph into diphthongs. There are eighteen diphthongs; like vowels, diphthongs do not have significant allophony.

==== Consonants ====
Finnish has a small consonant inventory, in which voicing is mostly not distinctive and fricatives are scarce. In the table below, consonants in parentheses are either found only in a few recent loans or are allophones of other phonemes.

		Labial	Dental/ Alveolar	Palatal (-alveolar)	Velar	Glottal
Nasal		m	n		ŋ	
Plosive	voiceless	p	t̪		k	
Plosive	voiced	(b)	d		(ɡ)	
Fricative		(f)	s	(ʃ)		h
Approximant		ʋ	l	j		
Trill			r			

- The short velar nasal only occurs in the sequence /ŋk/ in native vocabulary (where it could alternatively be analysed as an allophone of /n/), and the long velar nasal /ŋŋ/, written ⟨ng⟩, is the equivalent of /ŋk/ under weakening consonant gradation (type of lenition) and thus occurs only medially, e.g. Helsinki – Helsingin kaupunki (city of Helsinki) /helsiŋki – helsiŋŋin/.
- /d/ is the equivalent of /t/ under weakening consonant gradation, and thus in inherited vocabulary only occurs medially. Especially when spoken by older people, it is often more of an alveolar tap than a true voiced stop, and the dialectal realization varies widely; see the main article on Finnish phonology.

Almost all consonants have phonemic short and long (geminated) forms, although length is only contrastive in medial positions. Homosyllabic consonant clusters are mostly absent from native Finnish words, except for a small set of two-consonant sequences in syllable codas, e.g. ⟨rs⟩ in karsta. However, as many recently adopted loanwords contain clusters, e.g. strutsi from Swedish struts, ('ostrich'), they have been integrated to the modern language in varying degrees.

Finnish is somewhat divergent from other Uralic languages in two respects: it has lost most of its fricatives and lost the distinction between palatalized and non-palatalized consonants. Finnish has only two fricatives in native words, /s/ and /h/. All other fricatives are recognized as foreign, of which Finnish speakers can usually reliably distinguish /f/ and /ʃ/. The alphabet includes ⟨z⟩, usually realized as the affricate [ts], as in German.

While standard Finnish has lost palatalization, characteristic of Uralic languages, the eastern dialects and the Karelian language have redeveloped it. For example, the Karelian word d'uuri [dʲuːri], with a palatalized /dʲ/, is reflected by juuri in Finnish and Savo dialect vesj [vesʲ] is vesi in standard Finnish.

The phoneme /h/ can vary allophonically between [ç~x~h~ɦ] i.e. vihko ['ʋiçko̞], kahvi ['kɑxʋi], raha ['rɑɦɑ].

A feature of Finnic phonology is the development of labial and rounded vowels in non-initial syllables, as in the word tyttö. Proto-Uralic had only "a", "ä" and "i" in non-initial syllables; modern Finnish allows other vowels in non-initial syllables, although they are less common.

=== Prosody ===
Characteristic features of Finnish (common to some other Uralic languages) are vowel harmony and an agglutinative morphology; owing to the extensive use of the latter, words can be quite long.

The main stress is always on the first syllable, and is in average speech articulated by adding approximately 100 ms more length to the stressed vowel. Stress does not cause any measurable modifications in vowel quality (very much unlike English). However, stress is not strong and words appear evenly stressed. In some cases, stress is so weak that the highest points of volume, pitch and other indicators of "articulation intensity" are not on the first syllable, although native speakers recognize the first syllable as being stressed.

== Morphophonology ==
Finnish has several morphophonological processes that require modification of the forms of words for daily speech. The most important processes are vowel harmony and consonant gradation.

Vowel harmony is a redundancy feature, which means that the feature [±back] is uniform within a word, and so it is necessary to interpret it only once for a given word. It is meaning-distinguishing in the initial syllable, and suffixes follow; so, if the listener hears [±back] in any part of the word, they can derive [±back] for the initial syllable. For example, from the stem tuote ('product') one derives tuotteeseensa ('into his product'), where the final vowel becomes the back vowel "a" (rather than the front vowel "ä") because the initial syllable contains the back vowels "uo". This is especially notable because vowels "a" and "ä" are different, meaning-distinguishing phonemes, not interchangeable or allophonic. Finnish front vowels are not umlauts, though the graphemes ⟨ä⟩ and ⟨ö⟩ feature dieresis.

Consonant gradation is a partly nonproductive lenition process for P, T and K in inherited vocabulary, with the oblique stem "weakened" from the nominative stem, or vice versa. For example, tarkka 'precise' has the oblique stem tarka-, as in tarkan 'of the precise'. There is also another gradation pattern, which is older, and causes simple elision of T and K in suffixes. However, it is very common since it is found in the partitive case marker: if V is a single vowel, V+ta → Va, e.g. *tarkka+ta → tarkkaa.

== Orthography ==
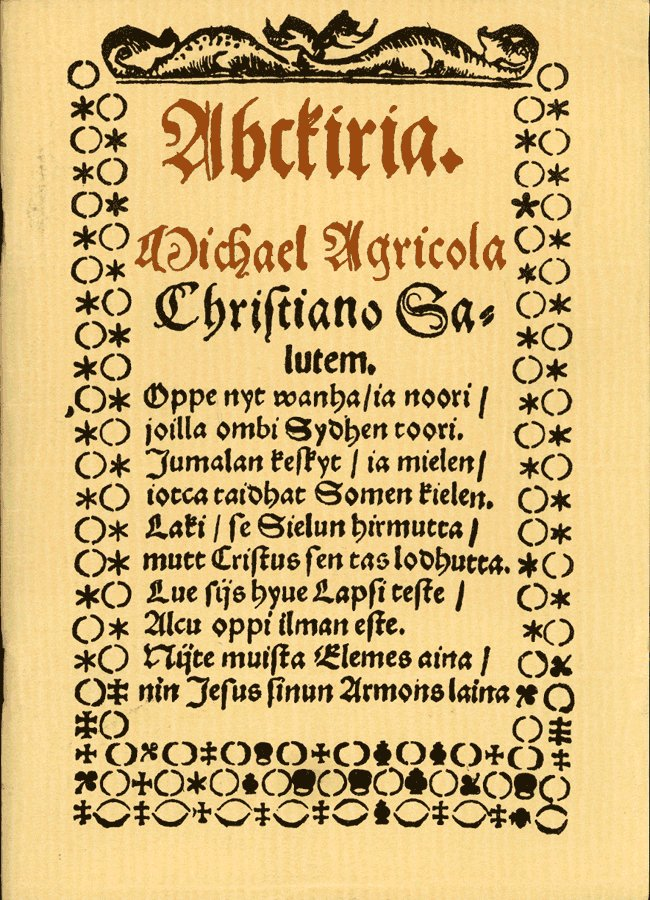
The first page of Abckiria (1543), the first book written in the Finnish language. The spelling of Finnish in the book had many inconsistencies: for example, the /k/ sound could be represented by ⟨c⟩, ⟨k⟩ or even ⟨g⟩; /uː/ and /iː/ were represented by ⟨w⟩ and ⟨ij⟩ respectively, and /æ/ was represented by ⟨e⟩.

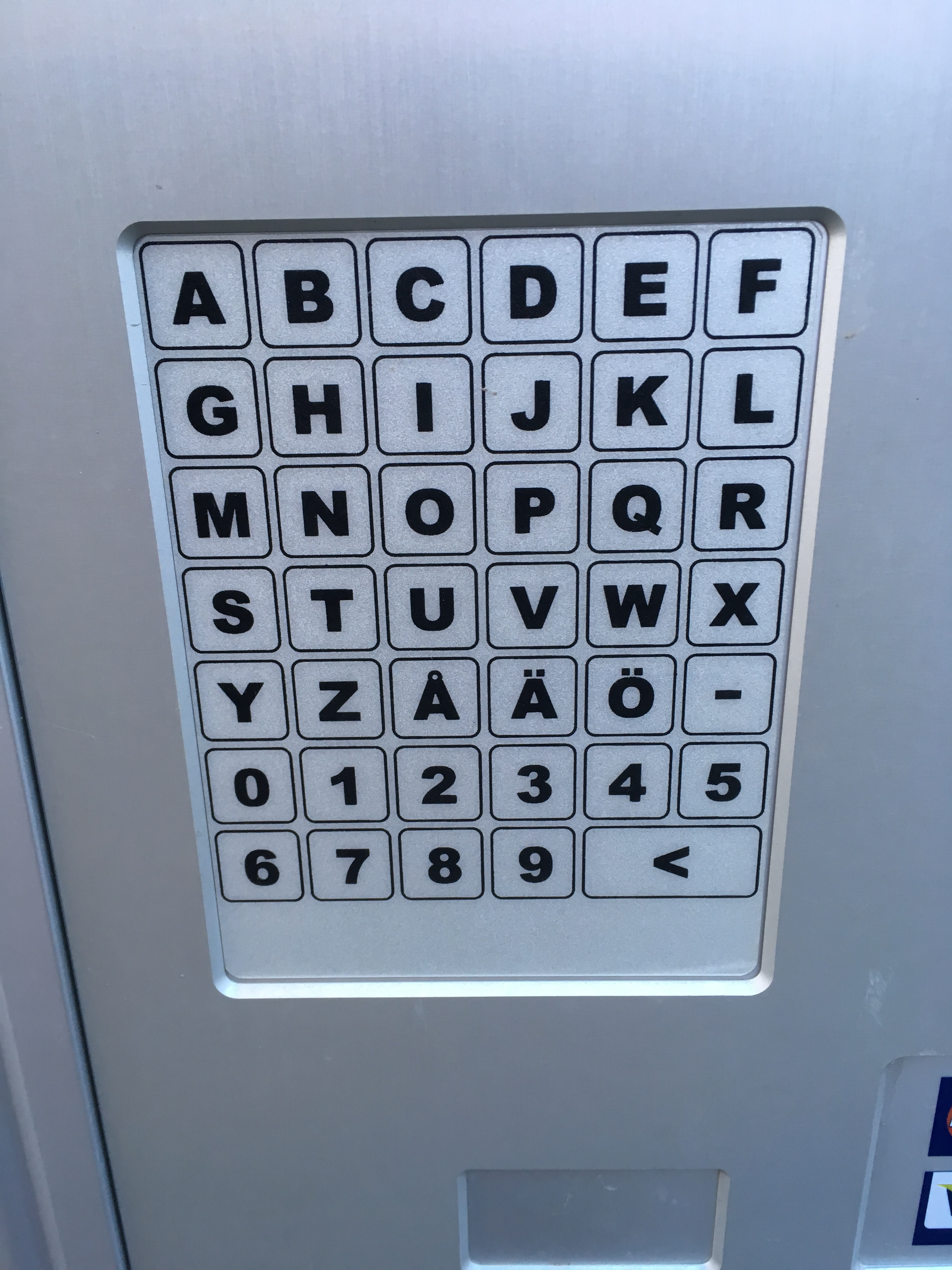
Parking meter keyboard with the Finnish alphabet

Finnish is written with the Latin alphabet including the distinct characters ⟨ä⟩ and ⟨ö⟩, and also several characters (⟨b, c, f, q, w, x, z, å, š⟩ and ⟨ž⟩) reserved for words of non-Finnish origin. The Finnish orthography follows the phonemic principle: each phoneme (meaningful sound) of the language corresponds to exactly one grapheme (independent letter), and each grapheme represents almost exactly one phoneme. This enables an easy spelling and facilitates reading and writing acquisition. The rule of thumb for Finnish orthography is write as you read, read as you write. However, morphemes retain their spelling despite sandhi.

Some orthographical notes:

- Long vowels and consonants are represented by double occurrences of the relevant graphemes. This causes no confusion, and permits these sounds to be written without having to nearly double the size of the alphabet to accommodate separate graphemes for long sounds. If a sequence of two identical vowels in different syllables occurs, it is written with an apostrophe, e.g. rei'itin "hole punch".
- The grapheme ⟨h⟩ covers all the allophones of /h/. In some positions, it has a fricative quality, which can be voiced glottal or voiceless velar or palatal. This occurs after or between vowels, as in e.g. lahti, which is pronounced [lɑxti] with a voiceless velar fricative.
- Sandhi is not transcribed; the spelling of morphemes is immutable, such as tulen+pa [tulempa].
- Some consonants (⟨v, j, d⟩) do not have distinctive length (and consonant length generally is only contrastive in certain positions), and consequently their allophonic variation is typically not specified in spelling; e.g. rajaan [rajaan] ('I limit') vs. raijaan [raijjaan] ('I haul').
- Pre-1900s texts and personal names use ⟨w⟩ for ⟨v⟩. Both correspond to the same phoneme, the labiodental approximant /ʋ/, a ⟨v⟩ without the fricative ("hissing") quality of the English ⟨v⟩.
- The letters ⟨ä⟩ [æ] and ⟨ö⟩ [ø], although written with two dots, do not represent phonological umlauts (as in German, for example), and they are considered independent graphemes; the letter shapes have been copied from Swedish. An appropriate parallel from the Latin alphabet are the characters ⟨C⟩ and ⟨G⟩ (uppercase), which historically have a closer kinship than many other characters (⟨G⟩ is a derivation of ⟨C⟩) but are considered distinct letters, and changing one for the other will change meanings.

Although Finnish orthography is mostly shallow, there are a few differences:

- The ⟨n⟩ in the sequence ⟨nk⟩ is pronounced as a velar nasal /ŋ/, as in English. When not followed by ⟨k⟩, /ŋː/ is written ⟨ng⟩. The fact that two spellings correspond to this one sound (putting aside the difference in length) can be seen as an exception to the general one-to-one correspondence between sounds and letters.
- Sandhi phenomena at word or clitic boundaries involving gemination (e.g., tule tänne is pronounced [tu.let.tæn.ne], not [tu.le.tæn.ne]) or the place assimilation of nasals (sen pupu would usually be pronounced as [sem.pu.pu], and onpa as [om.pɑ])
- The /j/ after the letter ⟨i⟩ is very weak or there is no /j/ at all, but in writing it is used; for example: urheilija. Indeed, the ⟨j⟩ is not used in writing words with consonant gradation such as aion and läksiäiset.

When the appropriate characters are not available, the graphemes ⟨ä⟩ and ⟨ö⟩ are usually converted to ⟨a⟩ and ⟨o⟩, respectively. This is common in e-mail addresses and other electronic media where there may be no support for characters outside the basic ASCII character set. Writing them as ⟨ae⟩ and ⟨oe⟩, following German usage, is rarer and usually considered incorrect, but formally used in passports and equivalent situations. Both conversion rules have minimal pairs which would no longer be distinguished from each other.

The sounds ⟨š⟩ and ⟨ž⟩ are not a part of the Finnish language itself and have been introduced by the Finnish national languages body for more phonologically accurate transcription of loanwords (such as Tšekki, 'Czech Republic') and foreign names. For technical reasons or convenience, the graphemes ⟨sh⟩ and ⟨zh⟩ are often used in quickly or less carefully written texts instead of ⟨š⟩ and ⟨ž⟩. This is a deviation from the phonetic principle, and as such is liable to cause confusion, but the damage is minimal as the transcribed words are foreign in any case. Finnish does not use the sounds ⟨z⟩, ⟨š⟩ or ⟨ž⟩, but for the sake of exactitude, they can be included in spelling. (The recommendation cites the Russian opera Hovanštšina as an example.) Many speakers pronounce all of them ⟨s⟩, or distinguish only between ⟨s⟩ and ⟨š⟩, because Finnish has no voiced sibilants.

The language may be identified by its distinctive lack of the letters ⟨b, c, f, q, w, x, z⟩ and ⟨å⟩.

== Alphabet and pronunciation ==
**A** **a** **[ɑː]**	B b [b]	C c [s]	**D** **d** **[d]**	**E** **e** **[eː]**	F f [f]	G g [g]	**H** **h** **[h]**	**I** **i** **[iː]**	**J** **j** **[j]**	**K** **k** **[k]**	**L** **l** **[l]**	**M** **m** **[m]**	**N** **n** **[n]**	**O** **o** **[oː]**	**P** **p** **[p]**	Q q [k]	**R** **r** **[ɹ]**	**S** **s** **[s]**	Š š [ʃ]	**T** **t** **[t]**	**U** **u** **[uː]**	**V** **v** **[v]**	W w [v]	X x [ks]	**Y** **y** **[yː]**	Z z [t͡s]	Ž ž [t͡ʃ]	**Ä** **ä** **[æː]**	**Ö** **ö** **[œː]**	Å å [ɔː]

Letters shown in Bold are indigenous. The rest of the letters are not indigenous and are used in loanwords and foreign names, with the exception of G, which appears natively only as part of the digraph ⟨ng⟩ to form the sound [ŋː].

== Grammar ==
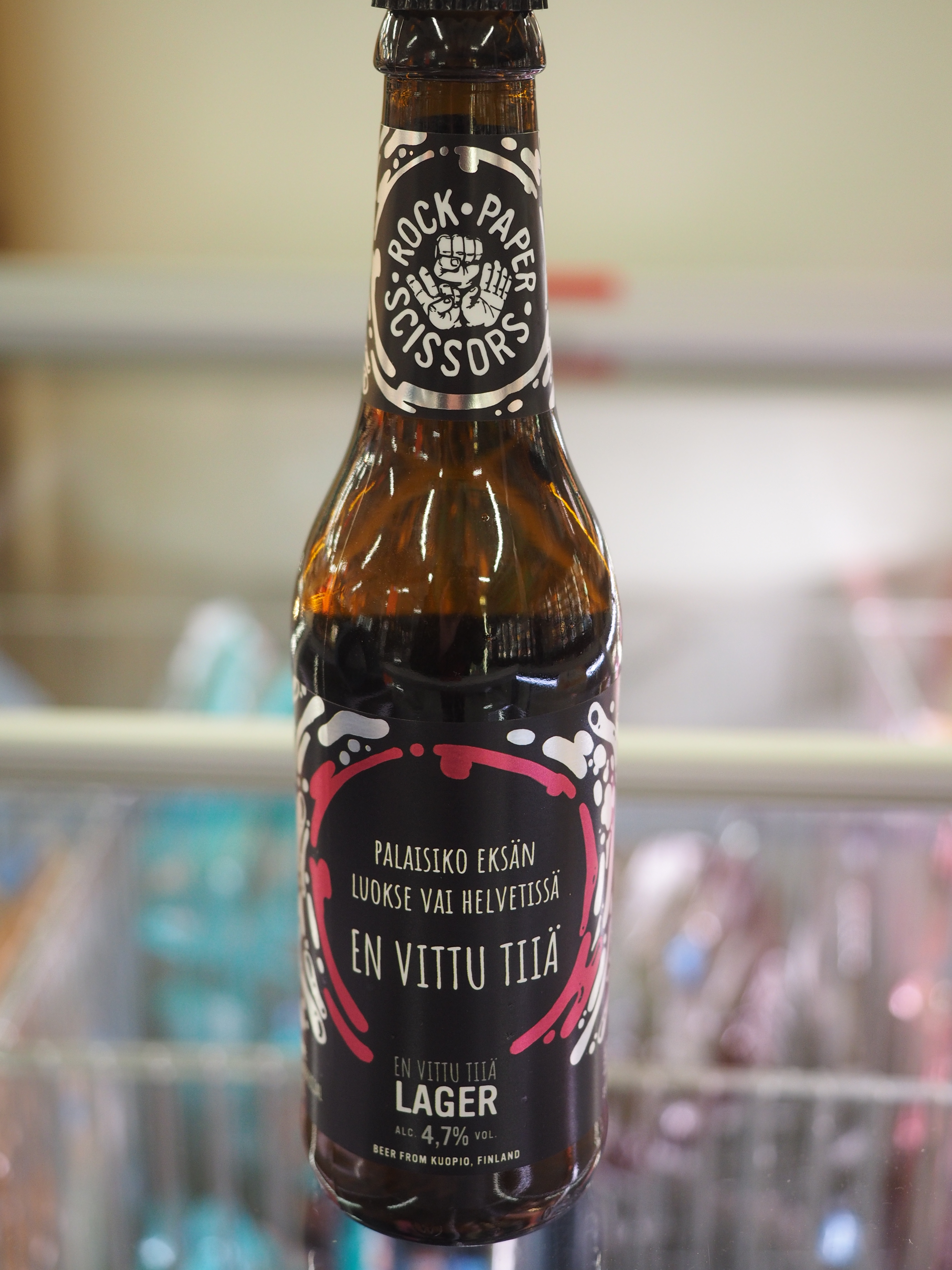
An example of the versatility of Finnish inflection. The label of this beer bottle reads Palaisiko eksän luokse vai helvetissä - en vittu tiiä, meaning "Should I return to my ex or burn in Hell - I don't fucking know". The same word palaisiko can mean either "should I return" or "should I burn" depending on whether it is inflected from palata ("to return") or from palaa ("to burn").

Finnish is a synthetic language that employs extensive agglutination of affixes to verbs, nouns, adjectives and numerals. However, Finnish is not generally considered polysynthetic, its morpheme-to-word ratio being somewhat lower than a prototypical polysynthetic language (e.g., Yup'ik).

The morphosyntactic alignment of Finnish is nominative–accusative, but there are two object cases: accusative and partitive. The contrast between accusative and partitive object cases is one of telicity, where the accusative case denotes actions completed as intended (Ammuin hirven 'I shot the/an elk (dead)'), and the partitive case denotes incomplete actions (Ammuin hirveä 'I shot (at) the/an elk'). Often telicity is confused with perfectivity, but these are distinct notions. Finnish in fact has a periphrastic perfective aspect, which in addition to the two inflectional tenses (past and present), yield a Germanic-like system consisting of four tense-aspect combinations: simple present, simple past, perfect (present + perfective aspect) and pluperfect (past + perfective aspect). No morphological future tense is needed; context and the telicity contrast in object grammatical case serve to disambiguate present events from future events. For example, syön kalan 'I eat a fish (completely)' must denote a future event, since there is no way to completely eat a fish at the current moment (the moment the eating is complete, the simple past tense or the perfect must be used). By contrast, syön kalaa 'I eat a fish (not yet complete)' denotes a present event by indicating ongoing action.

Finnish has three grammatical persons; finite verbs agree with subject nouns in person and number by way of suffixes. The (dictionary form) infinitive bears the suffix -ta/-tä (often lenited to -(d)a/-(d)ä due to consonant gradation). There is a so-called "passive voice" (sometimes called impersonal or indefinite) which differs from a true passive in various respects. Transitivity is distinguished in the derivational morphology of verbs, e.g. ratkaista 'to solve something' vs. ratketa 'to solve by itself'. There are also several frequentative and momentane affixes which form new verbs derivationally.

== Lexicon ==
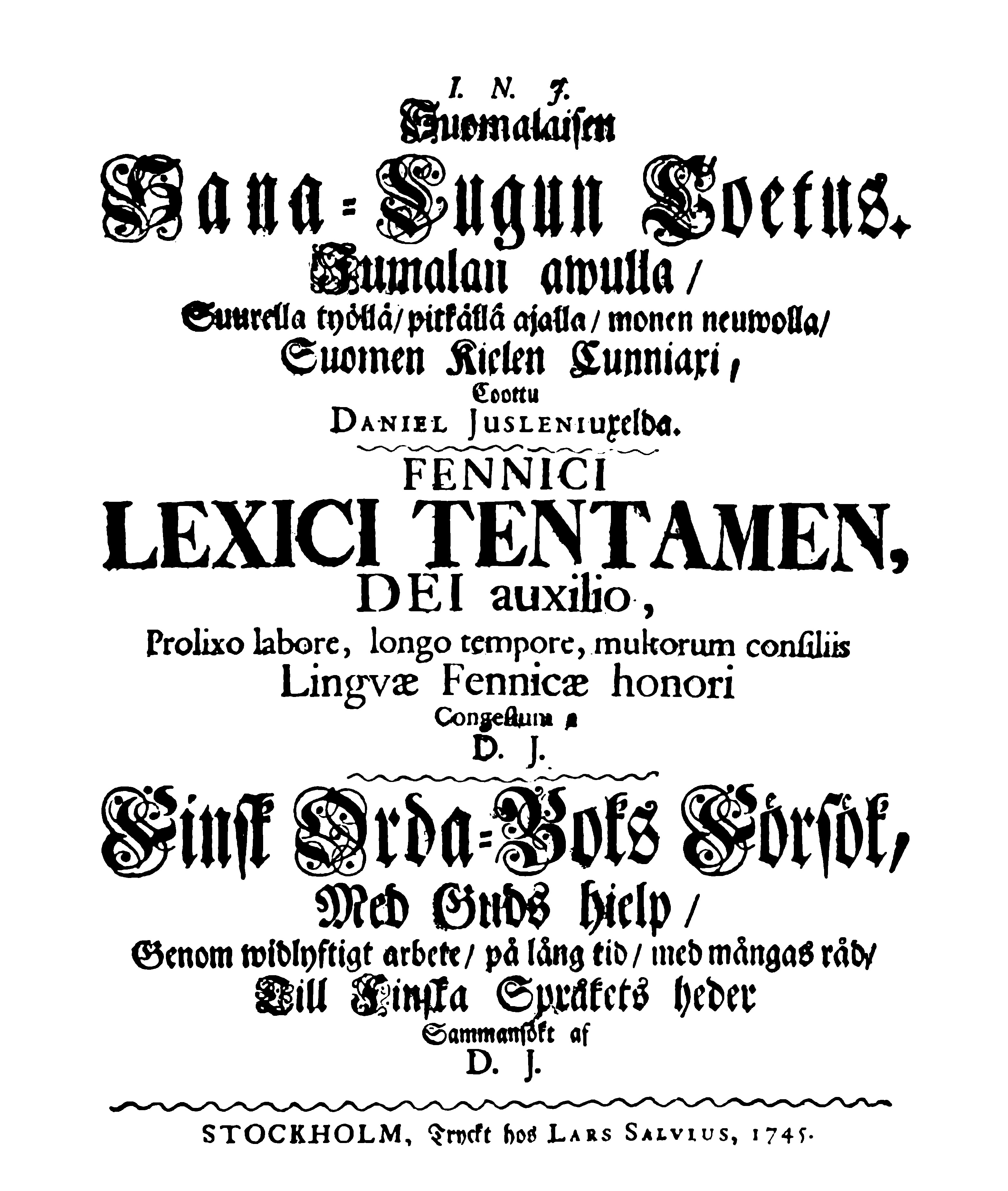
Suomalaisen Sana-Lugun Coetus (1745) by Daniel Juslenius was the first comprehensive dictionary of the Finnish language with 16,000 entries.

Finnish has a smaller core vocabulary than, for example, English, and uses derivational suffixes to a greater extent. As an example, take the word kirja "a book", from which one can form derivatives kirjain 'a letter' (of the alphabet), kirje 'a piece of correspondence, a letter', kirjasto 'a library', kirjailija 'an author', kirjallisuus 'literature', kirjoittaa 'to write', kirjoittaja 'a writer', kirjuri 'a scribe, a clerk', kirjallinen 'in written form', kirjata 'to write down, register, record', kirjasin 'a font', and many others.

Here are some of the more common such suffixes. Which of each pair is used depends on the word being suffixed in accordance with the rules of vowel harmony.

Examples of Finnish derivational suffixes on nouns
Suffix	Used to create...	Example(s)	Notes
-ja / -jä	agents from verbs	lukea 'to read' → lukija 'reader'	
-sto / -stö	collective nouns	kirja 'a book' → kirjasto 'a library' laiva 'a ship' → laivasto 'navy, fleet'	
-in	instruments or tools	kirjata 'to book, to file' → kirjain 'a letter' (of the alphabet) vatkata 'to whisk' → vatkain 'a whisk, mixer'	
-uri / -yri	agents or instruments	kaivaa 'to dig' → kaivuri 'an excavator' laiva 'a ship' → laivuri 'shipper, shipmaster'	
-os / -ös	result nouns from verbs	tulla 'to come' → tulos 'result, outcome' tehdä 'to do' → teos 'a piece of work'	
-ton / -tön	adjectives indicating the lack of something	onni 'happiness' → onneton 'unhappy' koti 'home' → koditon 'homeless'	
-kas / -käs	adjectives from nouns	itse 'self' → itsekäs 'selfish' neuvo 'advice' → neuvokas 'resourceful'	
-va / -vä	adjectives from verbs	taitaa 'to be able' → taitava 'skillful' johtaa 'to lead' → johtava 'leading'	
-llinen	adjectives from nouns	lapsi 'child' → lapsellinen 'childish' kauppa 'a shop, commerce' → kaupallinen 'commercial'	
-la / -lä	locations (places related to the stem)	kana 'a hen' → kanala 'a henhouse' pappi 'a priest' → pappila 'a parsonage'	
-lainen / -läinen	inhabitants (of places), among others	Englanti 'England' → englantilainen 'English person/thing' Venäjä 'Russia' → venäläinen 'Russian person or thing'.	formed from -la / -lä plus -inen

Verbal derivational suffixes are extremely diverse; several frequentatives and momentanes differentiating causative, volitional-unpredictable and anticausative are found, often combined with each other, often denoting indirection. For example, hypätä 'to jump', hyppiä 'to be jumping', hypeksiä 'to be jumping wantonly', hypäyttää 'to make someone jump once', hyppyyttää 'to make someone jump repeatedly' (or 'to boss someone around'), hyppyytyttää 'to make someone to cause a third person to jump repeatedly', hyppyytellä 'to, without aim, make someone jump repeatedly', hypähtää 'to jump suddenly' (in anticausative meaning), hypellä 'to jump around repeatedly', hypiskellä 'to be jumping repeatedly and wantonly'. Caritives are also used in such examples as hyppimättä 'without jumping' and hyppelemättä 'without jumping around'. The diversity and compactness of both derivation and inflectional agglutination can be illustrated with istahtaisinkohankaan 'I wonder if I should sit down for a while after all' (from istua, 'to sit, to be seated'):

- istua 'to sit down' (istun 'I sit down')
- istahtaa 'to sit down for a while'
- istahdan 'I'll sit down for a while'
- istahtaisin 'I would sit down for a while'
- istahtaisinko 'should I sit down for a while?'
- istahtaisinkohan 'I wonder if I should sit down for a while'
- istahtaisinkohankaan 'I wonder if I should sit down for a while after all'

=== Borrowing ===
Over the course of many centuries, the Finnish language has borrowed many words from a wide variety of languages, most from neighbouring Indo-European languages. Owing to the different grammatical, phonological and phonotactic structure of the Finnish language, loanwords from Indo-European have been assimilated.

While early borrowings, possibly even into Proto-Uralic, from very early Indo-European languages can be found, Finnic languages, including Finnish, have borrowed in particular from Baltic and Germanic languages, and to a lesser extent from Slavic and Indo-Iranian languages (all of which are subgroupings of Indo-European). Furthermore, a certain group of very basic and neutral words exists in Finnish and other Finnic languages that are absent from other Uralic languages, but without a recognizable etymology from any known language. These words are usually regarded as the last remnant of the Paleo-European language spoken in Fennoscandia before the arrival of the proto-Finnic language. Words included in this group are e.g. jänis (hare), musta (black), saari (island), suo (swamp) and niemi (cape (geography)).

Also some place names, like Päijänne and Imatra, are probably from before the proto-Finnic era.

Often quoted loan examples are kuningas 'king' and ruhtinas 'sovereign prince, high ranking nobleman' from Germanic *kuningaz and *druhtinaz—they display a remarkable tendency towards phonological conservation within the language. Another example is äiti 'mother' (from Germanic *aiþį̄), which is interesting because borrowing of close-kinship vocabulary is a rare phenomenon. The original Finnish emo and emä occurs only in restricted contexts. There are other close-kinship words that are loaned from Baltic and Germanic languages (morsian 'bride', armas 'dear', huora 'whore'). Examples of the ancient Iranian loans are vasara 'hammer' from Avestan vadžra, vajra and orja 'slave' from arya, airya 'man' (the latter probably via similar circumstances as slave from Slav in many European languages).

More recently, Swedish has been a prolific source of borrowings, and also, the Swedish language acted as a proxy for European words, especially those relating to government. Present-day Finland was a part of Sweden from the 12th century and was ceded to Russia in 1809, becoming an autonomous Grand Duchy. Swedish was retained as the official language and language of the upper class even after this. When Finnish was accepted as an official language, it gained legal equal status with Swedish. During the period of autonomy, Russian did not gain much ground as a language of the people or the government. Nevertheless, quite a few words were subsequently acquired from Russian (especially in older Helsinki slang) but not to the same extent as with Swedish. In all these cases, borrowing has been partly a result of geographical proximity.

Especially words dealing with administrative or modern culture came to Finnish from Swedish, sometimes reflecting the oldest Swedish form of the word (lag – laki, 'law'; län – lääni, 'province'; bisp – piispa, 'bishop'; jordpäron – peruna, 'potato'), and many more survive as informal synonyms in spoken or dialectal Finnish (e.g. likka, from Swedish flicka, 'girl', usually tyttö in Finnish).

Some Slavic loanwords are old or very old, thus hard to recognize as such, and concern everyday concepts, e.g. papu 'bean', raja 'border' and pappi 'priest'. Notably, a few religious words such as Raamattu ('Bible') are borrowed from Old East Slavic, which indicates language contact preceding the Swedish era. This is mainly believed to be result of trade with Novgorod from the 9th century on and Russian Orthodox missions in the east in the 13th century.

Most recently, and with increasing impact, English has been the source of new loanwords in Finnish. Unlike previous geographical borrowing, the influence of English is largely cultural and reaches Finland by many routes, including international business, music, film and TV (foreign films and programmes, excluding ones intended for a very young audience, are shown subtitled), literature, and the Web – the latter is now probably the most important source of all non-face-to-face exposure to English.

The importance of English as the language of global commerce has led many non-English companies, including Finland's Nokia, to adopt English as their official operating language. Recently, it has been observed that English borrowings are also ousting previous borrowings, for example the switch from treffailla 'to date' (from Swedish, träffa) to deittailla from English 'to go for a date'. Calques from English are also found, e.g. kovalevy (hard disk), and so are grammatical calques, for example, the replacement of the impersonal (passiivi) with the English-style generic you, e. g. sä et voi 'you cannot', instead of the proper impersonal ei voida 'one cannot' or impersonal third-person singular ei voi 'one cannot'. This construct, however, is limited to colloquial language, as it is against the standard grammar.

English loan words in Finnish slang include for example pleikkari 'PlayStation', hodari 'hot dog', and hedari 'headache', 'headshot' or 'headbutt'. Often these loanwords are distinctly identified as slang or jargon, rarely being used in a negative mood or in formal language. Most loan words are inevitably sooner or later calqued – translated into native Finnish – retaining the semantic meaning. Moreover, neologisms are coined actively not only by the government, but also by the media.

=== Neologisms ===
Some modern terms have been synthesised rather than borrowed, for example:

puhelin 'telephone' (from the stem puhel- 'talk' + instrument suffix -in to make 'an instrument for talking')
tietokone 'computer' (literally: 'knowledge machine' or 'data machine')
levyke 'diskette' (from levy 'disc' + a diminutive -ke)
sähköposti 'email' (literally: 'electricity mail')
linja-auto 'bus, coach' (literally: line-car)
muovi 'plastic' (from muovata 'to mould, form or model, e.g. from clay'; compare plastic from Ancient Greek πλᾰστῐκός (plastikós) 'mouldable, fit for moulding')

Neologisms are actively generated by the Language Planning Office and the media. They are widely adopted. One would actually give an old-fashioned or rustic impression using forms such as kompuutteri (computer) or kalkulaattori (calculator) when the neologism is widely adopted.

=== Loans to other languages ===
The most commonly used Finnish word in English is sauna, which has also been loaned to many other languages.

== Sample texts ==
Article 1 of the Universal Declaration of Human Rights:

Kaikki ihmiset syntyvät vapaina ja tasavertaisina arvoltaan ja oikeuksiltaan. Heille on annettu järki ja omatunto, ja heidän on toimittava toisiaan kohtaan veljeyden hengessä.
"All human beings are born free and equal in dignity and rights. They are endowed with reason and conscience and should act towards one another in a spirit of brotherhood."

Excerpt from Väinö Linna's Tuntematon sotilas (The Unknown Soldier); these words were also inscribed in the 20 mark note.

Hyväntahtoinen aurinko katseli heitä. Se ei missään tapauksessa ollut heille vihainen. Kenties tunsi jonkinlaista myötätuntoakin heitä kohtaan. Aika velikultia.
"The sun smiled down on them. It wasn't angry – no, not by any means. Maybe it even felt some sort of sympathy for them. Rather dear, those boys."

Sample of spoken Finnish
Taken from Wikipedia article on the Finnish language in Finnish

(translation from Liesl Yamaguchi's 2015 "Unknown Soldiers")

== Basic greetings and phrases ==
Sample sound of Hyvää huomenta

Finnish	Translation	Notes
Greetings
**(Hyvää) huomenta!**	(Good) morning!	
**(Hyvää) päivää!**	(Good) day!	used on greeting and also when taking farewell
**(Hyvää) iltaa!**	(Good) evening!	used on greeting and also when taking farewell
**Hyvää yötä!** **Öitä!**	Good night! Night!	
**Terve**	lit. 'Healthy!'	Used on greeting, modified as **Terve vaan!** ('health continue!')
**Moro**; **Hei(ppa)**; **Moi(kka)**	Hi! / Bye!	Used on greeting and also when taking farewell
**Moi moi!** **Hei hei!**	Bye!	Used when taking farewell
**Nähdään**	See you later!	Lit. the passive form of nähdä 'to see'
**Näkemiin**	Goodbye!	Lit. 'Until seeing', illative of the third infinitive
**Hyvästi**	Goodbye/Farewell	
**Hauska tutustua!** **Hauska tavata!**	Nice to meet you!	Hauska tutustua is literally 'nice to get acquainted', and hauska tavata is literally 'nice to meet'
**Mitä kuuluu?** **Miten menee?**	How are you? How's it going?	Mitä (sinulle/teille) kuuluu is literally 'what (to you) is heard?' or 'what concerns you?'
**Kiitos hyvää** **Kiitos hyvin**	Fine, thank you. Well, thank you.	Kiitos hyvää is an appropriate response to Mitä kuuluu?, whereas Kiitos hyvin is an appropriate response to Miten menee?
**Tervetuloa!**	Welcome!	Tervetuloa is used in a broader range of contexts in Finnish than in English; for example to mean 'looking forward to seeing you' after arranging a visit
Important words and phrases
**Anteeksi**	Excuse me	
**Kiitos** **Kiitoksia**	Thanks/Please	Kiitos/kiitoksia are literally 'thanks', but are also used when requesting something, like 'please' in English
**Kiitos, samoin**	Thank you, likewise	Lit. 'thank you, the same way' (used as a response to well-wishing)
**Ole hyvä**	You're welcome	Lit. 'be good', also used when giving someone something to mean 'here you are'
**Kyllä**	Certainly/yes	
**Joo**	Yeah	More informal than kyllä
**Ei**	No/it is not	
**Voitko auttaa?**	Can you help?	
**Apua!**	Help!	
**Totta kai!** **Tietysti!** **Toki!**	Certainly!	
**(Paljon) onnea**	Good luck/congratulations	
**Olen pahoillani**	I'm sorry	
**Odota**	Wait	
**Pieni hetki** **Pikku hetki** **Hetkinen**	One moment	
**Otan osaa**	My condolences	
**(Minä) ymmärrän.**	I understand.	
**En ymmärrä.**	I don't understand.	
**Suomi**	Finland	
**Suomi**; **Suomen kieli**	Finnish (language)	The first letter in "suomi" or "suomen kieli" should grammatically be lowercase.
**Suomalainen**	(noun) Finn; (adjective) Finnish	

== See also ==
- Finland's language strife
- Finnish cultural and academic institutes
- Finnish influences on Tolkien
- Finnish Language Day – Flag-flying day in Finland
- Finnish name
- Finnish numerals
- Finnish profanity
- Sisu
- Swedish-speaking Finns
