= Savo dialects =

Group of dialects of Finnish

Savonian
- Savonian Finnish
- Native to: Finland
- Region: Savo, Kainuu, Central Finland, Central Ostrobothnia
- Ethnicity: Savonians
- Language family: Uralic: Finnic; Northern Finnic; Ladogan; Eastern Finnish; Savonian

Official status
- Recognised minority language in: Rautavaara

Language codes
- ISO 639-3: –
- Glottolog: savo1254
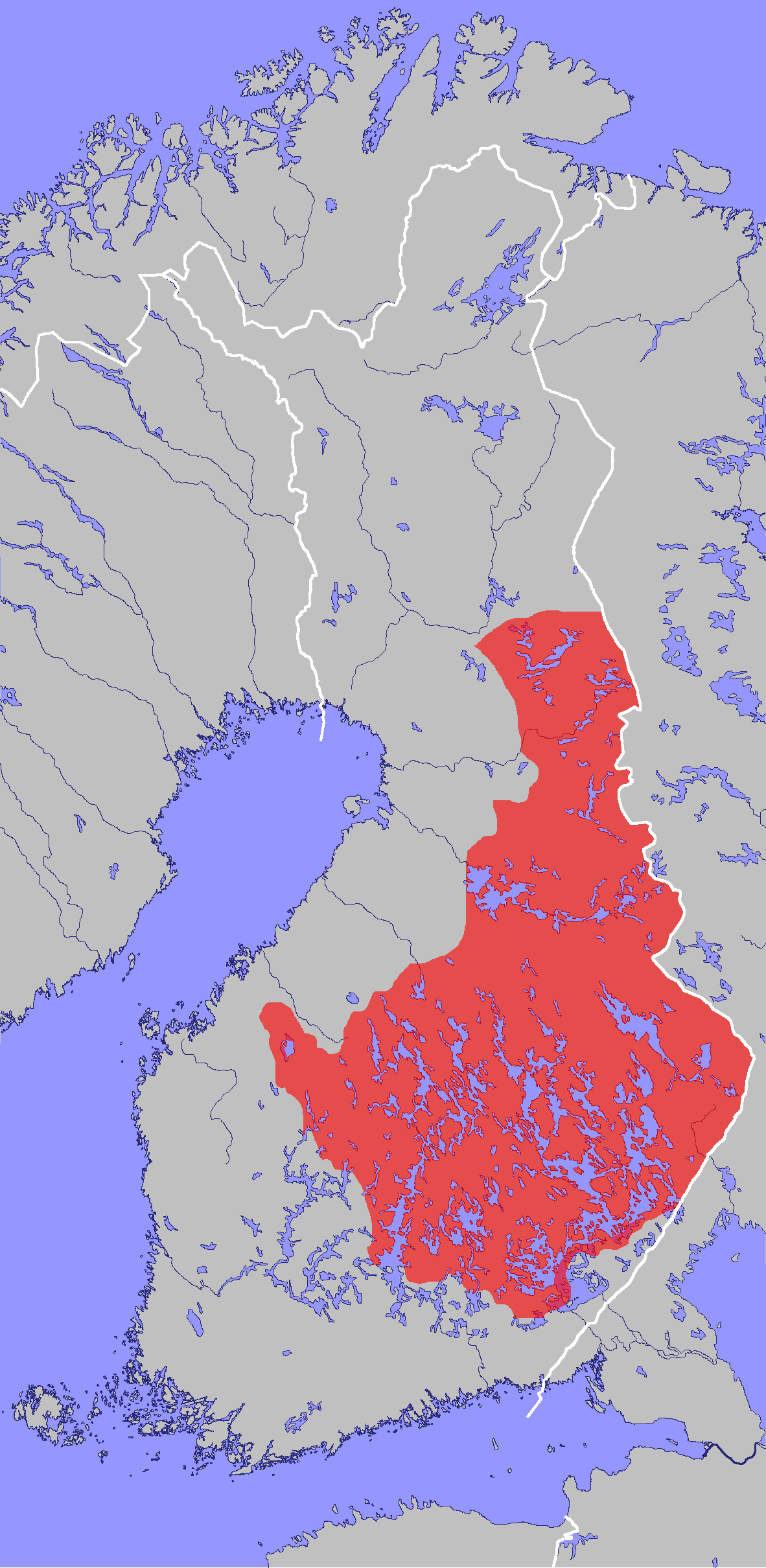
- The areas in which the Savo dialects are traditionally spoken.

The Savo dialects (also called Savonian dialects or Savo Finnish) (Finnish: Savolaismurteet) also sometimes more recently called the Savonian language (Finnish: Savon kieli) are forms of the Finnish language spoken in Savo and other parts of Eastern Finland. Finnish dialects are grouped broadly into Eastern and Western varieties; Savo dialects are of the Eastern variety.

Savo dialects are the most widely distributed Finnish dialect group (setting aside the higher-level east/west split mentioned above). They are spoken in Savo (both North and South Savo), but also in North Karelia, parts of Päijät-Häme, Central Finland, Kainuu, Koillismaa district of Northern Ostrobothnia, the lake section between Southern and Central Ostrobothnia as far north as Evijärvi and in the municipalities of Pudasjärvi and the Southern part of Ranua in Lapland. Also the language spoken by the Forest Finns in Värmland and Norwegian Hedmark of Central Scandinavia belonged to the old Savo dialects. The geographical area the Savo dialects cover makes up one-third the area of Finland.

While historically regarded as a Finnish dialect, the municipality of Rautavaara has since granted Savonian official recognition, calling for future talks concerning the possible conditions of Savonian becoming recognized as an official minority language of Finland.

== History ==
The Savo dialects are of different origin from Western Finnish dialects. Savo dialects form a dialect continuum with other Eastern dialects of Finnish and the Karelian language, with which they have common ancestry in the Proto-Karelian language spoken in the coast of Lake Ladoga in the Iron Age.

== Status ==
Savonian was recognized as an official "language" of the region of Rautavaara in 2026, with the municipality calling on other Eastern Finnish municipalities to follow with the decision. Although the municipality did not intend to replace the use of Standard Finnish, this decision will allow its use in official municipality meetings, and encouraged the translation of municipal signs and maps into Savonian. The municipality also encouraged future talks concerning possible prerequisites of Savonian becoming recognized as an official minority language of Finland.

== Dialects ==
=== Northern Savo dialects ===
Northern Savo dialects are spoken in the municipalities of Hankasalmi (Eastern part), Haukivuori, Heinävesi, Iisalmi, Joroinen, Jäppilä, Kaavi, Kangaslampi, Karttula, Keitele, Kiuruvesi, Konnevesi, (Eastern part), Kuopio, Lapinlahti, Leppävirta, Maaninka, Muuruvesi (part of Juankoski since 1971), Nilsiä, Pieksämäki, Pielavesi, Pyhäsalmi, Rantasalmi, Rautalampi, Riistavesi (part of Kuopio since 1973), Siilinjärvi, Sonkajärvi, Suonenjoki, Säyneinen (part of Juankoski since 1971), Tervo, Tuusniemi, Varpaisjärvi, Varkaus, Vehmersalmi, Vesanto, Vieremä and Virtasalmi.

=== Southern Savo dialects ===
Southern Savo dialects are spoken in the municipalities of Anttola, Hirvensalmi, Juva, Kangasniemi, Mikkeli, Mäntyharju, Pertunmaa, (Eastern part) Puumala, Ristiina, Sulkava and Suomenniemi.

=== Middle dialects of Savonlinna area ===
Middle dialects of Savonlinna area are spoken in the Eastern Savo, the municipalities surrounding the city of Savonlinna between Southern Savo and North Karelia: Enonkoski, Kerimäki, Punkaharju, Savonranta and Sääminki (part of Punkaharju and Savonlinna since 1973).

The dialect spoken in Enonkoski has many similarities with the dialects of Northern Savo, while the dialect spoken in the Southern parts of Punkaharju resembles South-Eastern dialects in many ways. The difference between dialects in Savonlinna district has its roots in the colonization history. The area of greater Kerimäki (which consisted Enonkoski, Punkaharju and Savonranta) was settled by Karelian people till the 16th century, but from the 14th century the Eastern side of Lake Pihlajavesi and the coasts of Puruvesi began to be settles by Savo Finns.

The differences between natural and governmental borders goes together in many ways. In Enonkoski the dialect is more Savonian in the Northern side of Hanhivirta. The other reason to this is that the Northern villages of Enonkoski belonged to Heinävesi in the 19th century, while the Southern villages were part of Kerimäki. The Northern border of Puruvesi goes through Lake Puruvesi. So the old Karelian-based dialect features have kept in Punkaharju much better than in Kerimäki, which is located in the Northern side of Puruvesi.

=== Eastern Savo dialects or the dialects of North Karelia ===
Eastern Savo dialects or the dialects of North Karelia are spoken in North Karelia in the municipalities of Eno, Ilomantsi, Joensuu, Juuka, Kesälahti, Kiihtelysvaara (now part of Joensuu), Kitee, Kontiolahti, Korpiselkä (now part of Russia, little part of Tohmajärvi since 1946), Outokumpu, Liperi, Nurmes, Pielisjärvi (part of Lieksa since 1973), Polvijärvi, Pyhäselkä, Pälkjärvi (now part of Russia, little part of Tohmajärvi since 1946), Rautavaara, Ruskeala (now part of Russia), Soanlahti, Tohmajärvi, Tuupovaara (now part of Joensuu) and Valtimo.

=== Dialects of Kainuu ===
Kainuu dialects are spoken in Hyrynsalmi, Kajaani, Kuhmo, Kuusamo, Paltamo, Posio, Pudasjärvi, Puolanka, Ranua (Southern part), Ristijärvi, Sotkamo, Suomussalmi, Taivalkoski and Vaala.

=== Dialects of Middle Finland ===
Dialects of Middle Finland are spoken in Hankasalmi (Western part), Karstula, Kinnula, Kivijärvi, Konginkangas (part of Äänekoski since 1993), Konnevesi (Western part), Kyyjärvi, Laukaa, Multia, Pihtipudas, Pylkönmäki, Saarijärvi, Sumiainen, Uurainen, Viitasaari and Äänekoski.

=== Dialects of Päijät-Häme ===
Päijät-Häme Savonian dialects are spoken in Joutsa, Jyväskylä, Jämsä, Korpilahti, Koskenpää (part of Jämsänkoski since 1969), Kuhmoinen, Leivonmäki, Luhanka, Muurame, Pertunmaa (Western part), Petäjävesi, Sysmä and Toivakka.

=== Middle dialects of Keuruu-Evijärvi ===
Middle dialects of Keuruu-Evijärvi are spoken in Alajärvi, Evijärvi, Keuruu, Lappajärvi, Lehtimäki, Pihlajavesi, Soini, Vimpeli and Ähtäri. This sub-dialect area is wedge shaped in the middle of Ostrobothnia, which has its own dialects and also Swedish-speaking population. This is the influence of slash-and-burn farmers from Savo who colonized the lake section in Southern Ostrobothnia in the 17th century.

=== Värmland Savonian dialects ===
The expansion of Savonian slash-and-burn agriculture, which started in the beginning of Modern era, expanded to Central Scandinavia. Mostly in the beginning of the 17th century Savonian settlers, mainly from the parish of Rautalampi, settled in Värmland, Sweden. In the beginning of the 19th century tens of thousands of people spoke the Savonian language as their mother tongue. These "Forest Finns" were an interesting group from a linguistic point of view because their language was isolated from other influences. The practice of slash and burn agriculture was prohibited in Sweden in the middle of the 17th century and no new Finnish settlers moved to the area. The language of Forest Finns lacked the Schwa vowel and gemination, which are used now in the dialect spoken in Rautalampi. Nowadays the Savonian dialect of Värmland is extinct. Its last speakers were Johannes Johansson-Oinonen (died in 1965) and Karl Persson (died 1968).

== Features ==
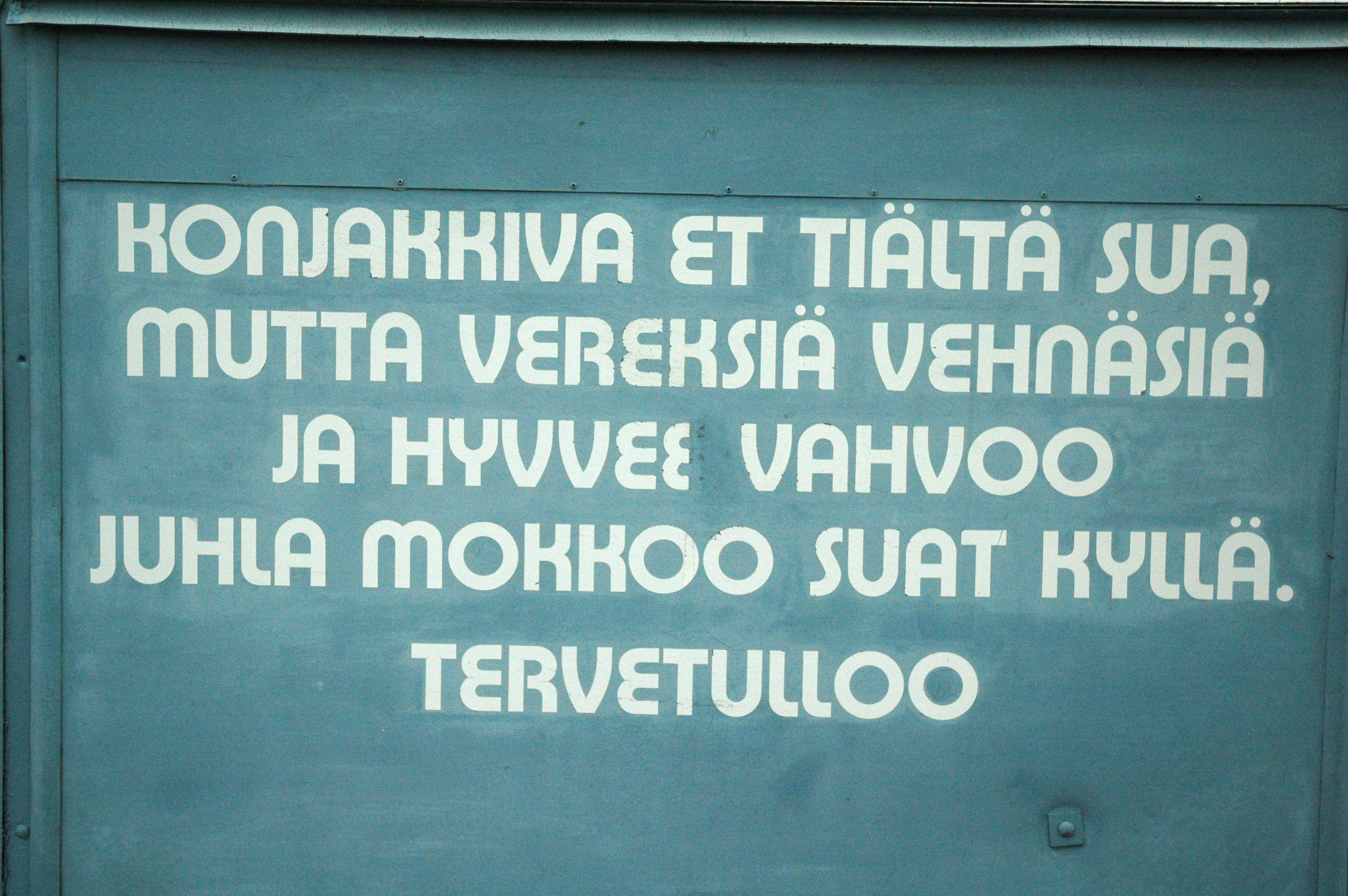
The Savo dialect on a sign. In English: You can't get cognac here, but you can get pulla and good Juhla Mokka (coffee). Welcome

Although the Savo dialects are spread over a large geographical area with significant variations, they are rather different from the standard language and are recognized as local dialects. There are large variations between different dialects, but a few of the most stereotypical features are the following.

=== Phonology ===
==== Vowels ====
1. Where standard Finnish has a diphthong, Savo may have a narrower diphthong or long vowel. Conversely, where standard Finnish has a long vowel, Savo may have a diphthong.
  - /i/ as the second element of a diphthong lowers to /e/, e.g. laeta for laita "side", söe for söi "ate".
  - /u, y/ lower similarly to /o, ø/, or they may assimilate completely to produce a long vowel, e.g. kaoppa or kaappa for standard Finnish kauppa "store", täönnä or täännä for täynnä "full".
  - When standard /ɑː, æː/ occur in an initial syllable (and thus have primary stress), they become opening diphthongs. In some varieties these are pronounced as /oɑ̯ eæ̯/, but in most varieties these diphthongs are wider: /uɑ̯ iæ̯/. Thus many Savo speakers have mua for Standard Finnish maa "land, country, ground", and have piä for pää "head".
2. Word-final /ɑː, æː, e:/ of standard Finnish correspond to Savonian /oː, eː, ø:/ respectively. Thus Savonians say rieskoo, lähtekee, and lirisöö for standard rieskaa, lähtekää, and lirisee.
3. When both would be unstressed, the otherwise bisyllabic combinations of o/ö/e followed by a/ä are produced as monosyllabic long vowels when no consonant intervenes. For instance, Savo dialects have ruskee for ruskea "brown", and have kyntöö for kyntöä "plowing (partitive)". (This change is not specific to Savo dialects and is found in most forms of spoken Finnish today.)
4. An epenthetic vowel is inserted after a medial syllable coda of /l/, /h/ or, in certain cases, /n/, e.g. vanaha (standard vanha "old").
  - The epenthetic vowel is often identical in quality to the preceding vowel. However, if the first of the non-epenthetic vowels is high and the second is low, the epenthetic vowel may be mid (but preserves the roundness specification of the preceding vowel). Thus silimä and silemä are different Savonian forms for standard Finnish silmä "eye", and kylymä and kylömä are Savonian version of kylmä "cold".

==== Consonants ====
1. Savo dialects have re-developed palatalized consonants (which were lost in Proto-Finnic). The consonants that can be palatalized are those that are coronal: l, n, t, r, s. Palatalization of these consonants occurs word-finally, in contexts where a consonant is followed by /i/ in standard Finnish. Orthographically, palatalization is often denoted by ⟨Cj⟩, where C is the palatalized consonant. Examples include ⟨kotj⟩ /kotʲ/ and ⟨moottorj⟩ /moottorʲ/ (standard Finnish koti, moottori).
2. Singleton consonants are geminated when they occur after a (primarily or secondarily) stressed short syllable and before a long vowel. Thus männöö, sattaa, opettelloo replace standard menee, sataa, opettelee. This gemination is fed by the process described point 3 of the preceding section: Native Savonians do not say that they speak savoa; they say that they speak savvoo (sa.vo.a → sa.voo → sav.voo).
  - In the eastern Savo dialects, this gemination is more general; it applies to non-singleton consonants (pelttoo, cf. standard peltoa), to consonants that don't ordinarily participate in the consonant gradation process, and after unstressed short vowels (hiihtämmään, cf. standard hiihtämään}).
3. The word-final /n/ of standard Finnish corresponds to a variety of consonants in Savo, depending on the environment in which it occurs.
  - When the next word begins with a vowel, /n/ is replaced with a glottal stop ⟨'⟩. For example, the genitive case, marked by /-n/ in the standard language, is marked with a glottal stop in the Savonian phrase isä' iän (standard isän ääni "father's voice").
  - Word-final /n/ assimilates to consonants that follow it, yielding a geminate consonant; mieler rauha contrasts with standard mielen rauha. Unlike standard Finnish, Savo Finnish permits gemination of /j/ and /h/, which gives examples like jäniksej jäläki (standard jäniksen jälki) in addition.
4. All syllable-initial consonants except the last one (which contacts the nucleic vowel) are systematically and completely removed in loanwords, e.g. raktorj (standard traktori).
5. The weak grade of /t/, in contrast to standard Finnish, is never [d]. In Savo the weak grade of this consonant may be [v(:)], [j(:)], [h], [t], or may simply be null.
  - [v] occurs between a long back vowel/diphthong and a short back vowel: haavan, haovvan for standard haudan.
  - [j] occurs between a long front vowel/diphthong and a short front vowel: teijjän for standard teidän.
  - /t/ weakens to [h] or is null following another instance of [h]: nähhä or nähä for standard nähdä.
  - If none of the above apply, the weak form may remain as /t/: tätin for standard tädin.
6. The /ts/ consonant sequences found in standard Finnish (whose weak grade is likewise /ts/ in the standard language) are not found in Savo dialects. Depending on the specific dialect they use, a Savo speaker may have:
  - /ht/ (weak grade /h/), thus mehtä, mehän instead of standard metsä, metsän "forest, forest's".
  - /ht/ (weak grade /t/), thus mehtä, metän.
  - /ss/ (weak grade /s/), thus messä, mesän.

=== Morphology and syntax ===
- The use of the -loi plural suffix is more general than in other dialects, including standard Finnish. For instance risti "cross" has the plural partitive form ristilöitä (standard Finnish: ristejä).
- Although standard and known elsewhere, the usage of verb compounds is particularly prevalent in Savo Finnish and a prolific source of creative expressions. The first verb is in the infinitive and indicates the action, and the second verb is inflected and indicates the manner. For example, seistä toljotat "you stand there gawking" consists of words meaning "to-stand you-gawk".

== Media ==
=== Music ===
The band Verjnuarmu performed melodic death metal in the Savo dialect, while Värttinä performs folk music. The folk song "Ievan polkka" is in the dialect as well.

== Sources ==
- Suomen murrealueet ('Finnish dialects' – in Finnish)
