= South Karelian dialects =

Group of dialects of Finnish

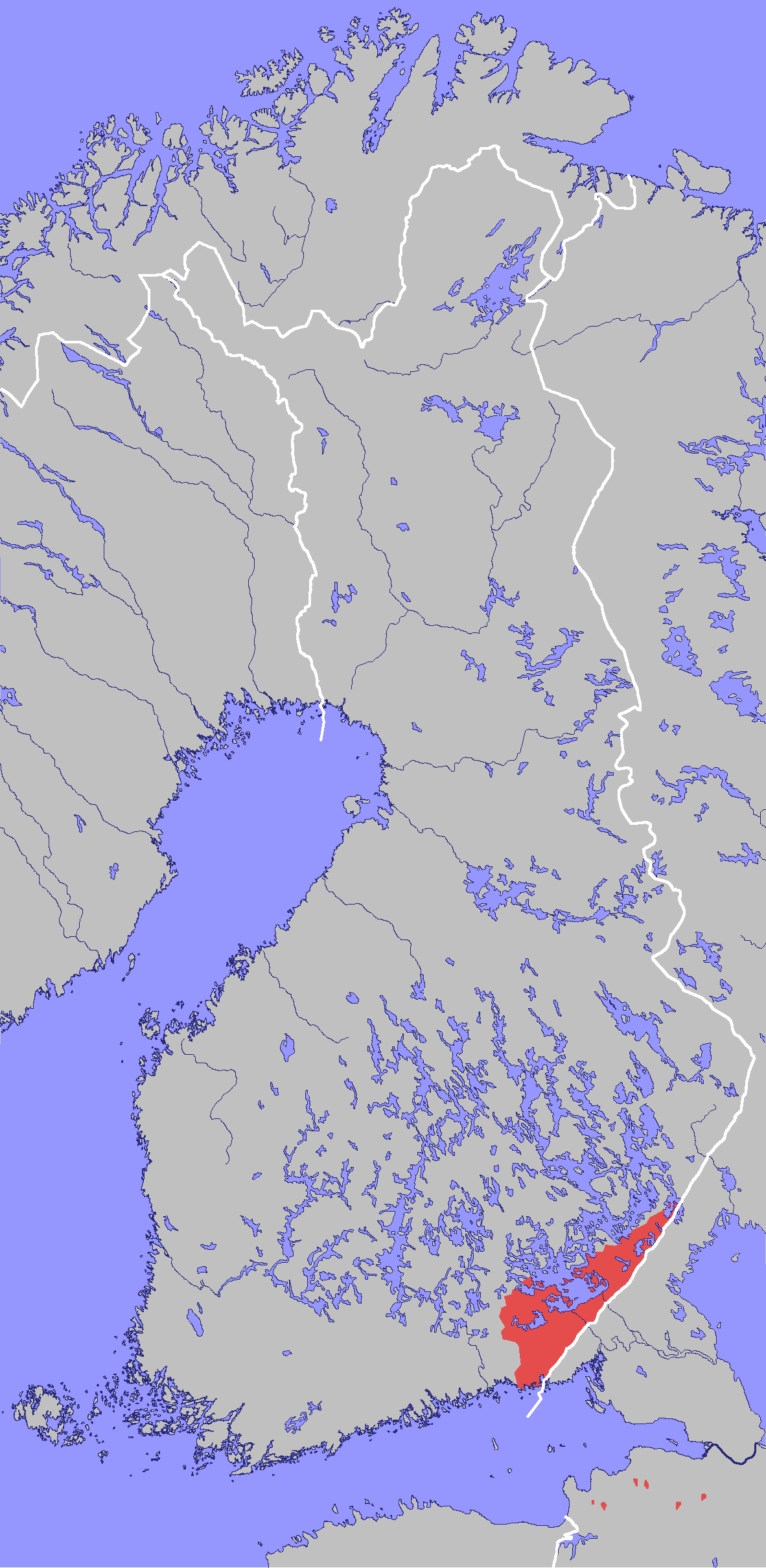
The area in which the Southeastern dialects of Finnish is traditionally spoken.

South Karelian dialects, Karelian dialects or Southeast Finnish dialects (Finnish: kaakkoismurteet) are Eastern Finnish dialects spoken in South Karelia, along with eastern parts of Kymenlaakso (Virolahti and Miehikkälä). Prior to the Winter War, the dialects were spoken along the Karelian Isthmus and Ingria. However, the South Karelian dialect speakers from the parts of Karelia taken by the Soviet Union were evacuated into the rest of Finland where their speech was assimilated into the new environment. Use of the Ingrian dialects is declining.

South Karelian dialects have been influenced by Russian.

== Features ==
Standard Finnish /d/: → -

- lehen
- Standard Finnish: lehden 'leave's' (genitive singular of lehti)

Standard Finnish /ts/: → /ss/, /ht/ or /st/

- mehtä, messä, metsä
- Standard Finnish: metsä 'forest'

Inessive ending: -ssA → -s

- maas
- Standard Finnish: maassa 'on the ground; in a/the country'

Vowels -eä and -ea

- korkia
- Standard Finnish: korkea 'high, tall'

Palatalization

- ves'
- Standard Finnish: vesi 'water'

Third-person plural imperfect ending

- tulliit
- Standard Finnish: tulivat 'they came'

Lack of syntactic gemination and glottal stop

- syntactic gemination
  - tule tänne /ˈtule ˈtænːe/
  - Standard Finnish: tule tänne /ˈtuleˣ ˈtænːeˣ/ 'come here' (2nd-person singular imperative of tulla 'come')
- glottal stop
  - sadealue /ˈsɑdeˌɑlue/
  - Standard Finnish: sadealue /ˈsɑdeʔˌɑlueˣ/ 'area of precipitation' (term used in weather forecasts)

=== Vocabulary ===
- a = well
- vot = good, well
- kehtoittaa = to be tired or bored
- sankia = thick
- tällviisii = in this manner
- lusti = joy
- potuska = pillow
- most = maybe

The pre-WWII extent of the South Karelian and Ingrian dialects

== See also ==
- Ingrian dialects
- Savonian dialects
- Tavastian dialects
