= Finnish consonant gradation =

Characteristic of the Finnish language

Consonant gradation is the term used for a systematic set of alternations which are widespread in Finnish grammar. These alternations are a form of synchronic lenition. They occur also in other Finnic and Uralic languages; see consonant gradation for a more general overview.

== Overview and gradation types ==
Consonant gradation involves an alternation in consonants between a strong grade in some forms of a word and a weak grade in others. The strong grade usually appears in the nominative singular of nominals and the first infinitive of verbs. However, there are phonologically predictable sets of nominals and verbs where nominatives and infinitives feature the weak grade, while other forms have the strong grade. The consonants subject to this change are plosives /p, t, k/ when preceded by a vowel, a sonorant /m, n, l, r/, or an /h/. Plosives that are preceded by any other obstruent, or followed by any consonant, do not display gradation. There are two types of gradation present in Finnish; these are detailed below.

=== Quantitative gradation ===
The first type of gradation affects geminate (long) plosives /pː, tː, kː/ (orthographically ⟨pp, tt, kk⟩), these are lenited to non-geminate versions /p, t, k/ in the weak grade. This type of gradation is called quantitative gradation due to the fact that the duration of a given plosive alternates between grades.

Strong	Weak	Example
pp	p	pappi : papit, lamppu : lamput
tt	t	katto : katot, kortti : kortit
kk	k	pukki : pukit, pankki : pankit

For quantitative gradation, whether the strong or the weak grade appears is determined phonologically, for the most part. Generally speaking, if there are two syllables in a row, both of which would be closed if gradation did not apply, the consonant that constitutes the onset of the second syllable will be in the weak grade. (There are some apparent exceptions to this rule, discussed below.)

As an example, consider the alternation pappi : papit ('priest/pastor' : 'priests/pastors'). The nominative singular pappi is syllabified into two syllables ([pɑp.pi]), but only the first is closed, thus gradation does not apply. By contrast, the stem pappi- and nominative plural suffix -t would form a word with two adjacent closed syllables (the ungrammatical *pappit *[pɑp.pit], with the geminate pp providing the onset of the second syllable), so the strong grade geminate pp appears instead in the weak grade: papit. This alternation has been hypothesized to be a result of a pressure for syllable dissimilation.

Quantitative gradation is still productive, as can be seen from the gradation behavior of loanwords, and may even include new quantitative gradation patterns that are not native to Finnish:

Strong	Weak	Example
bb	b	lobbaan : lobata
gg	g	bloggaan : blogata

=== Qualitative gradation ===
The second type of gradation, termed qualitative gradation, involves an alternation between single plosives /p, t, k/ in the strong grade and various voiced segments (or no segment at all: ∅) in the weak grade. In general, this type of gradation is not predictable phonologically, and is no longer productive. Originally, each voiceless stop altered to its voiced fricative equivalent (p to /β ~ v/, t to /ð/, and k to /ɣ/) but in contemporary Finnish, /ð/ is usually now pronounced as /d/, and /ɣ/ disappeared or changed.

Strong	Weak	Example	Notes
p	v	läpi : lävet	
t	d	katu : kadut	
k	∅	pako : paot	
k	v	puku : puvut, kyky : kyvyt	In the combinations -uku- and -yky-.
k	j	jälki : jäljet, kurki : kurjet	When followed by e and preceded by h, l or r.

Qualitative gradation can feed gliding, making the link between strong and weak forms more opaque. For example, the weak grades of poika 'boy, son' and aika 'time' are pojat and ajat. These are derived first by k > ∅ qualitative gradation, with subsequent i > j gliding and resyllabification.

Some words, however, have truly exceptional qualitative gradation patterns that don't precisely fit into the general scheme explained above. In some words where k might be expected to become j in the weak form, it isn't present altogether, such as in pyyhe : pyyhkeet 'towel(s)'. Alternatively it may remain unchanged, such as in pihka : pihkat 'resin(s)'. These cases contrast with the typical pattern whereby k lenites to j when followed by e and preceded by h, as in pohje : pohkeet 'calf : calves' (on the leg).

In a subtype of qualitative gradation, the weak grade of a single plosive after a nasal or liquid becomes a copy of the preceding consonant. This is termed assimilative gradation, and can be understood as typical qualitative gradation followed by progressive assimilation.

Strong	Weak	Example
mp	mm	kampi : kammet
nt	nn	lento : lennot
lt	ll	kielto : kiellot
rt	rr	parta : parrat
nk /ŋk/	ng /ŋː/	kenkä : kengät

== Scope of gradation ==
Quantitative and qualitative gradation behave somewhat differently with regard to which words they can apply to. Quantitative gradation is still productive in Finnish, i.e. it is applied to loanwords that enter the language (e.g. rokki : rokin "rock music"). Personal names and neologisms are likewise affected by quantitative gradation; the personal name Pekka has the genitive form Pekan, and the neologic nickname /ˈpikːi/ (from the acronym PIK) has the genitive singular form /ˈpikin/.

By contrast, qualitative gradation applies only to words that were inherited from Proto-Finnic or the period shortly after it. It is no longer productive, in that it does not generally apply to loanwords (e.g. auto: auton 'automobile', compare native maito : maidon 'milk'), neologisms (e.g. the syllabic acronym NaPa : NaPan, compare the common noun napa : navan), or personal names (Hilta : Hiltan, compare the common noun silta : sillan). However, personal names may in fact be affected by qualitative gradation if derived from a known common noun (e.g. Säde : Säteen from säde 'ray', Sointu : Soinnun from sointu 'chord'). Likewise, surnames often feature qualitative gradation, because many Finnish surnames are derived from common nouns, e.g. Mäki : Mäen from mäki : mäen 'hill'.

Speakers may attempt to inflect native words without gradation or other associated morphophonological alternations, if they are previously unfamiliar with the gradational inflection: e.g. paasi 'monolith' will often have the unalternating genitive singular paasin rather than alternating paaden (compare native vesi : veden 'water', versus recent loanword vaasi : vaasin 'vase').

The discussion below focuses on gradation as it appears in native vocabulary.

== Inverse gradation ==
Grammars of Finnish may identify words that display "inverse gradation". To understand what this means, it is useful to note that a typical gradation pattern is one where the word stem ends in a vowel, and verbal infinitives and the nominative singular of nominals displays the strong grade, while the first person singular, present tense form of verbs and the genitive singular form of nominals displays the weak grade. An example of standard gradation in the nominal domain is pappi : papit, where the nominative singular pappi shows the strong grade. The nominative plural suffix -t closes the final syllable, causing the weak grade to appear.

The inverse pattern arises when the stem ends in a consonant. (This includes "ghost consonants", which are not marked orthographically and are only pronounced before other consonants.) With consonant-final words, it is the weak grade that appears in the infinitive and nominative singular, while the strong grade is found elsewhere. Consonant stems are thus said to have "inverse gradation" because the dictionary forms of the words exhibit a weak grade and gradate "backwards" (that is, get stronger moving from the nominative singular to the genitive singular, for example).

Type	Stem ends in	Infinitive NOM SG	1SG present GEN SG
Standard gradation	Vowel	Strong grade	Weak grade
Inverse gradation	Consonant	Weak grade	Strong grade

This state of affairs has a phonological explanation put forward by Paul Kiparsky. As mentioned above, gradation is tied to syllable structure: the strong grade appears when the consonant stands at the beginning of an open syllable (ending in a vowel), while the weak grade appears when the syllable is closed (ending in a consonant). In consonant stem nominals, the final consonant itself closes the preceding syllable, while in verbs, the combination of stem-final consonant plus the infinitive ending closes the preceding syllable; thus the weak grade appears for these forms. In the 1SG present and genitive singular, an extra e is inserted after the stem, which opens the syllable, hence creating a strong grade.

An example from the nominal domain is the inverse pattern pohje^{x} : pohkeet, where superscript "x" represents the ghost consonant. This consonant closes the second syllable, causing a weak grade. However, when this stem is inflected, an epenthetic e is added. Since the ghost consonant is now syllabified as the onset of the third syllable (/poh.ke.^{x}e-/), the second syllable is no longer closed, and the strong grade k appears. Ghost consonants are not pronounced between vowels, however, so resyllabification applies, yielding /poh.kee-/ as the final version of the stem to which affixes are added.

== Multiple instances of gradation in a word ==
The weak grade of long consonants still triggers the weak grade on a preceding syllable, even though the consonant itself is not pronounced as long. The word tiedoton ("unknowing"), for example, features a weak grade d in the root, despite the fact that it is present in an open syllable. The reason for this state of affairs has to do with the privative suffix -ton that is present. The underlying representation of this suffix is -ttom(a) (as can be seen transparently in forms like tiedo-ttoma-sti "unknowingly"). Importantly, this underlying representation contains a long consonant tt, which closes the preceding syllable. This is what yields the weak grade tiedo- from strong grade tieto. The final a of -ttom(a) doesn't manifest when this affix occurs word-finally, triggering word-final m > n (as Finnish words can only end in coronal consonants). This n now closes the final syllable of the word, triggering quantitative gradation on the affix itself. So though it appears that the t : d gradation in tiedoton is unmotivated, it was in fact motivated at the point when it applied. Subsequently, the conditions that motivated t : d gradation were made opaque by a subsequent application of consonant gradation (see counterbleeding).

== Historical sound changes affecting gradation ==
The loss of certain sounds from Proto-Finnic has made the workings of consonant gradation less transparent. The result is that in modern Finnish, there may be phonetically open syllables preceded by weak grades (such as pohje 'calf'), and closed syllables preceded by strong grades (such as pohkeet 'calves').

Two sounds that were lost were word-final *-k and *-h. (Contemporary Finnish allows only coronal consonants word-finally.) Since *-k and *-h formerly closed the final syllable of a word, they triggered the weak grade. In modern Finnish, such words now appear as a weak grade consonant followed by a word-final vowel, but the word will have a special assimilative final consonant that causes gemination to the initial consonant of the next syllable. This assimilative final consonant, termed a ghost consonant is a remnant of the former final *-k and *-h. Forms where this applies include:

- First infinitive, -a, -da, -ta (Proto-Finnic *-dak, *-t'ak). The second infinitive is equivalent, but with e. The t in the ending -ta is thus a weak grade, reflecting a former long consonant, which was formed by combining the verb's stem-final -t- (seen in the imperative -tkaa) with the normal infinitive -t-. Verbs with this infinitive ending are thus actually consonant stems.
- Connegative forms of verbs (Proto-Finnic *-k).
- The second-person singular imperative (Proto-Finnic *-k).
- Most nominals ending in -e (Proto-Finnic *-eh and *-ek), for example ranne : ranteen. These nominals look superficially like vowel stems, but the ghost consonant makes them consonant stems and they still inflect as such.

The loss of certain consonants in the middle of a word caused the two adjacent syllables to fall together into one. The former of these syllables was open, and so the syllable began with consonants in the strong grade. After they fell together, this continued to be the case, even when this new syllable was closed. Most occurrences in non-initial syllables of long vowels or diphthongs ending in u or y are the result of this loss of consonants, and therefore trigger the strong grade on the consonants at the start of the syllable, regardless of whether the syllable is closed. Some examples of this include:

- Illative case, for example kukka → kukkaan (formerly *kukkahen).
- Present tense of verbs with infinitive ending in -ta, for example tavata : tapaan (formerly *tapaden). Verbs of this type are consonant stems; the lost *-d- is the weak grade of the former stem-final consonant *-t-.
- The imperative endings -kaa- and -koo- (formerly *-kade, *-kohe-).
- Most case forms of nominals ending in -s, for example kuningas : kuninkaat (formerly *kuninkahat).
- Most case forms of nominals ending in -e, for example hylje : hylkeet. As mentioned above, these are consonant stems and formerly had a final consonant *-k or *-h in the nominative.

An exception occurs in the present tense passive ending -taan. This ending shows a weak grade, where the other passive endings have a strong grade, such as the past (-ttiin) and conditional (-ttaisiin) passive. The conditional ending is clearly segmented into three parts -tta-isi-in, where -isi- is the conditional mood suffix. It could therefore be argued that the present tense simply lacks any infix at all. By this reasoning, the suffix is underlyingly *-tta-an, which consists of a long vowel with no lost consonant, so that the syllable is closed and the initial consonant is weakened.
