= Lenition =

Consonant sound change

In linguistics, lenition is a sound change that alters consonants, making them "weaker" in some way. The word lenition means 'softening' or 'weakening' (from Latin lēnis 'weak'). Lenition can happen both synchronically (within a language at a particular point in time) and diachronically (as a language changes over time). Lenition can involve such changes as voicing a voiceless consonant, causing a consonant to relax occlusion, to lose its place of articulation (a phenomenon called debuccalization, which turns a consonant into a glottal consonant like [h] or [ʔ]), or even causing a consonant to disappear entirely.

An example of synchronic lenition is found in most varieties of American English, in the form of tapping: the /t/ of a word like wait [weɪt] is pronounced as the more sonorous [ɾ] in the related form waiting [ˈweɪɾɪŋ]. Some varieties of Spanish show debuccalization of /s/ to [h] at the end of a syllable, so that a word like estamos "we are" is pronounced [ehˈtamoh]. An example of diachronic lenition can be found in the Romance languages, where the /t/ of Latin patrem ("father", accusative) has become /d/ in Italian (an irregular change; compare saeta "silk" > seta) and Spanish padre (the latter weakened synchronically /d/ → [ð̞]), while in Catalan pare, French père and Portuguese pai historical /t/ has disappeared completely.

In some languages, lenition has been grammaticalized into a consonant mutation, which means it is no longer triggered by its phonological environment but is now governed by its syntactic or morphological environment. For example, in Welsh, the word cath "cat" begins with the sound /k/, but after the definite article y, the /k/ changes to [ɡ]: "the cat" in Welsh is y gath. This was historically due to intervocalic lenition, but in the plural, lenition does not happen, so "the cats" is y cathod, not *y gathod. The change of /k/ to [ɡ] in y gath is thus caused by the syntax of the phrase, not by the modern phonological position of the consonant /k/.

The opposite of lenition, fortition, a sound change that makes a consonant "stronger", is less common, but Breton and Cornish have "hard mutation" forms which represent fortition.

== Types ==
Lenition involves changes in manner of articulation, sometimes accompanied by small changes in place of articulation. There are two main lenition pathways: opening and sonorization. In both cases, a stronger sound becomes a weaker one. Lenition can be seen as a movement on the sonority hierarchy from less sonorous to more sonorous, or on a strength hierarchy from stronger to weaker.

In examples below, a greater-than sign indicates that one sound changes to another. The notation [t] > [ts] means that [t] changes to [ts].

The sound change of palatalization sometimes involves lenition.

Lenition includes the loss of a feature, such as deglottalization, in which glottalization or ejective articulation is lost: [kʼ] or [kˀ] > [k].

The tables below show common sound changes involved in lenition. In some cases, lenition may skip one of the sound changes. The change voiceless stop > fricative is more common than the series of changes voiceless stop > affricate > fricative.

=== Opening ===
In the opening type of lenition, the articulation becomes more open with each step. Opening lenition involves several sound changes: shortening of double consonants, affrication of stops, spirantization or assibilation of stops or affricates, debuccalization, and finally elision.

- [tt] or [tː] > [t] (shortening, example in Greek)
- [t] > [ts] (affrication, for example Latin: terra to Aromanian: tsarã)
- [t] or [ts] > [s] (spirantization, example in Gilbertese language)
- [t̚] > [ʔ]; [s] > [h] (debuccalization, example in English or Spanish)
- [t], [ts], [s], [ʔ], [h] > ∅ (elision, for example Old French: feste to French: fête (cf. Spanish: fiesta))

geminated stop	→	stop	→	affricate	→	fricative	→	placeless approximant	→	no sound
original sound	→	degemination	→	affrication	→	spirantization (deaffrication)	→	debuccalization	→	elision
[pp] or [ppʰ]	→	[p] or [pʰ]	→	[pɸ]	→	[ɸ]	→	[h]	→	(zero)
[pp] or [ppʰ]	→	[p] or [pʰ]	→	[pf]	→	[f]	→	[h]	→	(zero)
[tt] or [ttʰ]	→	[t] or [tʰ]	→	[tθ]	→	[θ]	→	[h]	→	(zero)
[tt] or [ttʰ]	→	[t] or [tʰ]	→	[ts]	→	[s]	→	[h]	→	(zero)
[kk] or [kkʰ]	→	[k] or [kʰ]	→	[kx]	→	[x]	→	[h]	→	(zero)

=== Sonorization ===
The sonorization type involves voicing. Sonorizing lenition involves several sound changes: voicing, approximation, and vocalization.

- [t] > [d] (voicing, example in Korean)
- [d] > [ð] (approximation, example in Spanish)
- [d] > [i] (vocalization)

Sonorizing lenition occurs especially often intervocalically (between vowels). In this position, lenition can be seen as a type of assimilation of the consonant to the surrounding vowels, in which features of the consonant that are not present in the surrounding vowels (e.g. obstruction, voicelessness) are gradually eliminated.

stop	→	voiced stop	→	continuant (fricative, trill, etc.)			→	approximant			→	no sound
original sound	→	voicing (sonorization)	→	spirantization, trilling			→	approximation			→	elision
[p]	→	[b]	→	[β]			→	[β̞]			→	(zero)
[p]	→	[b]	→		[v]		→		[ʋ]		→	(zero)
[p]	→	[b]	→		[v]		→			[w]	→	(zero)
[t]	→	[d]	→	[ð]			→	[ð̞]			→	(zero)
[t]	→	[d]	→		[z]		→	[ɹ]			→	(zero)
[t]	→	[d]	→			[r]	→	[ɹ]			→	(zero)
[k]	→	[ɡ]	→	[ɣ]			→	[ɰ]			→	(zero)
[k]	→	[ɡ]	→	[ɣ]			→		[j], [w]		→	(zero)

Some of the sounds generated by lenition are often subsequently "normalized" into related but cross-linguistically more common sounds. An example would be the changes [b] → [β] → [v] and [d] → [ð] → [z]. Such normalizations correspond to diagonal movements down and to the right in the above table. In other cases, sounds are lenited and normalized at the same time; examples would be direct changes [b] → [v] or [d] → [z].

==== Vocalization ====
L-vocalization is a subtype of the sonorization type of lenition. It has two possible results: a velar approximant or back vowel, or a palatal approximant or front vowel. In French, l-vocalization of the sequence /al/ resulted in the diphthong /au/, which was monophthongized, yielding the monophthong /o/ in Modern French.

lateral approximant	→	semivowel	→	vowel
[l]	→	[w] [ɰ]	→	[u] [o]
[l]	→	[j]	→	[i]

=== Mixed ===
Sometimes a particular example of lenition mixes the opening and sonorization pathways. For example, [kʰ] may spirantize or open to [x], then voice or sonorize to [ɣ].

Lenition can be seen in Canadian and American English, where /t/ and /d/ soften to a tap [ɾ] (flapping) when not in initial position and followed by an unstressed vowel. For example, both rate and raid plus the suffix -er are pronounced [ˈɹeɪ̯ɾɚ]. The Italian of Central and Southern Italy has a number of lenitions, the most widespread of which is the deaffrication of /t͡ʃ/ to [ʃ] between vowels: post-pausal cena [ˈt͡ʃeːna] 'dinner' but post-vocalic la cena [laˈʃeːna] 'the dinner'; the name Luciano, although structurally /luˈt͡ʃano/, is normally pronounced [luˈʃaːno]. In Tuscany, /d͡ʒ/ likewise is realized [ʒ] between vowels, and in typical speech of Central Tuscany, the voiceless stops /p t k/ in the same position are pronounced respectively [ɸ θ x/h], as in /la kasa/ → [laˈhaːsa] 'the house', /buko/ → [ˈbuːho] 'hole'.

== Effects ==
=== Diachronic ===
Diachronic lenition is found, for example, in the change from Latin into Spanish, in which the intervocalic voiceless stops [p t k] first changed into their voiced counterparts [b d ɡ], and later into the approximants or fricatives [β̞ ð̞ ɣ̞]: vita > vida, lupa > loba, caeca > ciega, apotheca > bodega. One stage in these changes goes beyond phonetic to have become a phonological restructuring, e.g. /lupa/ > /loba/ (compare /lupa/ in Italian, with no change in the phonological status of /p/). The subsequent further weakening of the series to phonetic [β̞ ð̞ ɣ̞], as in [loβ̞a] is diachronic in the sense that the developments took place over time and displaced [b, d, ɡ] as the normal pronunciations between vowels. It is also synchronic in an analysis of [β̞ ð̞ ɣ̞] as allophonic realizations of /b, d, ɡ/: illustrating with /b/, /bino/ 'wine' is pronounced [bino] after pause, but with [β̞] intervocalically, as in [de β̞ino] 'of wine'; likewise, /loba/ → [loβ̞a].

A similar development occurred in the Celtic languages, where non-geminate intervocalic consonants were converted into their corresponding weaker counterparts through lenition (usually stops into fricatives but also laterals and trills into weaker laterals and taps), and voiceless stops became voiced. For example, Indo-European intervocalic *-t- in *teu̯teh₂ "people" resulted in Proto-Celtic *toutā, Primitive Irish *tōθā, Old Irish túath /t̪ʰuaθ/ and ultimately debuccalisation in most Irish and some Scottish dialects to /t̪ʰuəh/, shift in Central Southern Irish to /t̪ʰuəx/, and complete deletion in some Modern Irish and most Modern Scots Gaelic dialects, thus /t̪ʰuə/.

An example of historical lenition in the Germanic languages is evidenced by Latin-English cognates such as pater, tenuis, cornu vs. father, thin, horn. The Latin words preserved the original stops, which became fricatives in old Germanic by Grimm's law. A few centuries later, the High German consonant shift led to a second series of lenitions in Old High German, chiefly of post-vocalic stops, as evidenced in the English-German cognates ripe, water, make vs. reif, Wasser, machen.

Although actually a much more profound change encompassing syllable restructuring, simplification of geminate consonants as in the passage from Latin to Spanish such as cuppa > /ˈkopa/ 'cup' is often viewed as a type of lenition (compare geminate-preserving Italian /ˈkɔppa/).

=== Synchronic ===
==== Allophonic ====
All varieties of Sardinian, with the sole exception of Nuorese, offer an example of sandhi in which the rule of intervocalic lenition applying to the voiced series /b d ɡ/ extends across word boundaries. Since it is a fully active synchronic rule, lenition is not normally indicated in the standard orthographies.

/b/	→ [β]: baca [ˈbaka] "cow" → sa baca [sa ˈβaka] "the cow"
/d/	→ [ð]: domu [ˈdɔmu] "house" → sa domu [sa ˈðɔmu] "the house"
/ɡ/	→ [ɣ]: gupu [ˈɡupu] "ladle" → su gupu [su ˈɣupu] "the ladle"

A series of synchronic lenitions involving opening, or loss of occlusion, rather than voicing is found for post-vocalic /p t k/ in many Tuscan dialects of Central Italy. Stereotypical Florentine, for example, has the /k/ of /kasa/ as [ˈkaːsa] casa 'house' in a post-pause realization, [iŋˈkaːsa] in casa 'in (the) house' post-consonant, but [laˈhaːsa] la casa 'the house' intervocalically. Word-internally, the normal realization is also [h]: /ˈbuko/ buco 'hole' → [ˈbuːho].

==== Grammatical ====
In the Celtic languages, the phenomenon of intervocalic lenition historically extended across word boundaries. This explains the rise of grammaticalised initial consonant mutations in modern Celtic languages through the loss of endings. A Scottish Gaelic example would be the lack of lenition in am fear /əm fɛr/ ("the man") and lenition in a' bhean /ə vɛn/ ("the woman"). The following examples show the development of a phrase consisting of a definite article plus a masculine noun (taking the ending -os) compared with a feminine noun taking the ending -a. The historic development of lenition in those two cases can be reconstructed as follows:

Proto-Celtic *(s)indos wiros IPA: [wiɾos] → Old Irish ind fer [fʲeɾ] → Middle Irish in fer [fʲeɾ] → Classical Gaelic an fear [fʲeɾ] → Modern Gaelic am fear [fɛɾ]

Proto-Celtic *(s)indā benā IPA: [vʲenaː] → Old Irish ind ben [vʲen] → Middle Irish in ben [vʲen] → Classical Gaelic an bhean [vʲen] → Modern Gaelic a' bhean [vɛn]

Synchronic lenition in Scottish Gaelic affects almost all consonants (except /l̪ˠ/, which has lost its lenited counterpart in most areas). Changes such as /n̪ˠ/ to /n/ involve the loss of secondary articulation; in addition, /rˠ/ → /ɾ/ involves the reduction of a trill to a tap. The spirantization of Gaelic nasal /m/ to /v/ is unusual among forms of lenition, but it is triggered by the same environment as more prototypical lenition. (It may also leave a residue of nasalization in adjacent vowels.) The orthography shows that by inserting an h (except after l n r).

===== Spirantization =====
/p/	→ /v/	bog /pok/ "soft" → glé bhog /kleː vok/ "very soft"
/pj/	→ /vj/ (before a back vowel)	beò /pjɔː/ "alive" → glé bheò /kleː vjɔː/ "very alive"
/kʰ/	→ /x/	cas /kʰas̪/ "steep" → glé chas /kleː xas̪/ "very steep"
/kʰʲ/	→ /ç/	ciùin /kʰʲuːɲ/ "quiet" → glé chiùin /kleː çuːɲ/ "very quiet"
/t̪/	→ /ɣ/	dubh /t̪uh/ "black" → glé dhubh /kleː ɣuh/ "very black"
/tʲ/	→ /ʝ/	deiseil /tʲeʃal/ "ready" → glé dheiseil /kleː ʝeʃal/ "very ready"
/k/	→ /ɣ/	garbh /kaɾav/ "rough" → glé gharbh /kleː ɣaɾav/ "very rough"
/kʲ/	→ /ʝ/	geur /kʲiaɾ/ "sharp" → glé gheur /kleː ʝiaɾ/ "very sharp"
/m/	→ /v/	maol /mɯːl̪ˠ/ "bald" → glé mhaol /kleː vɯːl̪ˠ/ "very bald"
/mj/	→ /vj/ (before a back vowel)	meallta /mjaul̪ˠt̪ə/ "deceitful" → glé mheallta /kleː vjaul̪ˠt̪ə/ "very deceitful"
/pʰ/	→ /f/	pongail /pʰɔŋɡal/ "exact" → glé phongail /kleː fɔŋɡal/ "very exact"
/pʰj/	→ /fj/ (before a back vowel)	peallagach /pʰjal̪ˠakəx/ "shaggy" → glé pheallagach /kleː fjal̪ˠakəx/ "very shaggy"
===== Loss of secondary articulation =====
/n̪ˠ/	→ /n/	nàdarra /n̪ˠaːt̪ərˠə/ "natural" → glé nàdarra /kleː naːt̪ərˠə/ "very natural"
/rˠ/	→ /ɾ/	rag /rˠak/ "stiff" → glé rag /kleː ɾak/ "very stiff"
/l̪ˠ/	→ /lˠ/	lag /l̪ˠak/ "weak" → glé lag /kleː lˠak/ "very weak" (in Harris Gaelic only)
===== Debuccalization =====
/s̪/	→ /h/	sona /s̪ɔnə/ "happy" → glé shona /kleː hɔnə/ "very happy"
/ʃ/	→ /h/	seasmhach /ʃes̪vəx/ "constant" → glé sheasmhach /kleː hes̪vəx/ "very constant"
/ʃ/	→ /hj/ (before a back vowel)	seòlta /ʃɔːl̪ˠt̪ə/ "sly" → glé sheòlta /kleː hjɔːl̪ˠt̪ə/ "very sly"
/t̪ʰ/	→ /h/	tana /t̪ʰanə/ "thin" → glé thana /kleː hanə/ "very thin"
/tʰʲ/	→ /h/	tinn /tʲiːɲ/ "ill" → glé thinn /kleː hiːɲ/ "very ill"
/tʰʲ/	→ /hj/ (before a back vowel)	teann /tʰʲaun̪ˠ/ "tight" → glé theann /kleː hjaun̪ˠ/ "very tight"
===== Elision =====
/f/	→ Ø	fann /faun̪ˠ/ "faint" → glé fhann /kleː aun̪ˠ/ "very faint"
/fj/	→ /j/ (before a back vowel)	feòrachail /fjɔːɾəxal/ "inquisitive" → glé fheòrachail /kleː jɔːɾəxal/ "very inquisitive"
===== Reduction of place markedness =====
In the modern Goidelic languages, grammatical lenition also triggers the reduction of markedness in the place of articulation of coronal sonorants (l, r, and n sounds). In Scottish Gaelic, /n/ and /l/ are the weak counterparts of palatal /ɲ/ and /ʎ/.
/ɲ/	→ /n/	neulach /ɲial̪ˠəx/ "cloudy" → glé neulach /kleː nial̪ˠəx/ "very cloudy"
/ʎ/	→ /l/	leisg /ʎeʃkʲ/ "lazy" → glé leisg /kleː leʃkʲ/ "very lazy"

=== Blocked lenition ===
Some languages which have lenition have in addition complex rules affecting situations where lenition might be expected to occur but does not, often those involving homorganic consonants. This is colloquially known as 'blocked lenition', or more technically as 'homorganic inhibition' or 'homorganic blocking'. In Scottish Gaelic, for example, there are three homorganic groups:

- d n t l s (usually called the dental group in spite of the non-dental nature of the palatals)
- c g (usually called the velar group)
- b f m p (usually called the labial group)

In a position where lenition is expected due to the grammatical environment, lenition tends to be blocked if there are two adjacent homorganic consonants across the word boundary. For example:

- aon 'one' (which causes lenition) → aon chas 'one leg' vs aon taigh 'one house' (not aon *thaigh)
- air an 'on the' (which causes lenition) → air a' chas mhòr 'on the big leg' vs air an taigh donn "on the brown house" (not air an *thaigh *dhonn)

In modern Scottish Gaelic this rule is productive only in the case of dentals but not the other two groups for the vast majority of speakers. It also does not affect all environments any more. For example, while aon still invokes the rules of blocked lenition, a noun followed by an adjective generally no longer does so. Hence:

- ad "hat" (a feminine noun causing lenition) → ad dhonn "a brown hat" (although some highly conservative speakers retain ad donn)
- caileag "girl" (a feminine noun causing lenition) → caileag ghlic "a smart girl" (not caileag *glic)

There is a significant number of frozen forms involving the other two groups (labials and velars) and environments as well, especially in surnames and place names:

- MacGumaraid 'Montgomery' (mac + Gumaraid) vs MacDhòmhnaill 'MacDonald (mac + Dòmhnall)
- Caimbeul 'Campbell' (cam 'crooked' + beul 'mouth') vs Camshron 'Cameron' (cam + sròn 'nose')
- sgian-dubh 'Sgian-dubh' (sgian 'knife' + dubh '1 black 2 hidden'; sgian as a feminine noun today would normally cause lenition on a following adjective) vs sgian dhubh "a black knife" (i.e., a common knife which just happens to be black)

Though rare, in some instances the rules of blocked lenition can be invoked by lost historical consonants – for example, in the case of the past-tense copula bu, which in Common Celtic had a final -t. In terms of blocked lenition, it continues to behave as a dental-final particle invoking blocked lenition rules:

- bu dona am biadh "bad was the food" versus bu mhòr am beud 'great was the pity'

In Brythonic languages, only fossilized vestiges of lenition blocking occur; for example in Welsh nos da 'good night', lenition is blocked (nos as a feminine noun normally causes lenition of a following modifier, for example Gwener 'Friday' yields nos Wener 'Friday night'). Within Celtic, blocked lenition phenomena also occur in Irish (for example aon doras 'one door', an chéad duine 'the first person') and Manx (for example un dorrys 'one door', yn chied dooinney 'the first man').

Outside Celtic, in Spanish orthographic b d g are retained as [b, d, ɡ] following nasals rather than their normal lenited forms [β, ð, ɣ].

== Orthography ==
In the modern Celtic languages, lenition of the "fricating" type is usually denoted by adding an h to the lenited letter. In Welsh, for example, c, p, and t change into ch, ph, th as a result of the so-called "aspirate mutation" (carreg, "stone" → ei charreg "her stone"). An exception is Manx orthography, which tends to be more phonetic, but in some cases, etymological principles are applied. In the Gaelic script, fricating lenition (usually called simply lenition) is indicated by a dot above the affected consonant, and in the Roman script, the convention is to suffix the letter h to the consonant, to signify that it is lenited. Thus, a ṁáṫair is equivalent to a mháthair. In Middle Irish manuscripts, lenition of s and f was indicated by the dot above, and lenition of p, t, and c was indicated by the postposed h; lenition of other letters was not indicated consistently in the orthography.

Voicing lenition is represented by a simple letter switch in the Brythonic languages, for instance carreg, "stone" → y garreg, "the stone" in Welsh. In Irish orthography, it is shown by writing the "weak" consonant alongside the (silent) "strong" one: peann, "pen" → ár bpeann "our pen", ceann, "head" → ár gceann "our head" (sonorization is traditionally called "eclipsis" in Irish grammar).The Irish orthographic convention was adopted by Breton grammarians in the late 19th century, but dropped again in the mid 20th.

Although nasalization as a feature also occurs in most Scottish Gaelic dialects, it is not shown in the orthography on the whole, as it is synchronic (the result of certain types of nasals affecting a following sound), rather than the diachronic Irish type sonorization (after historic nasals). For example taigh [t̪ʰɤj] "house" → an taigh [ən̪ˠˈd̪ʱɤj] "the house".

== Consonant gradation ==
The phenomenon of consonant gradation in Finnic languages is also a form of lenition.

An example with geminate consonants comes from Finnish, where geminates become simple consonants while retaining voicing or voicelessness (e.g. katto → katon, dubbaan → dubata). It is also possible for entire consonant clusters to undergo lenition, as in Votic, where voiceless clusters become voiced, e.g. itke- "to cry" → idgön.

If a language has no obstruents other than voiceless stops, other sounds are encountered, as in Finnish, where the lenited grade is represented by chronemes, approximants, taps or even trills. For example, Finnish used to have a complete set of spirantization reflexes for /p t k/, though these have been lost in favour of similar-sounding phonemes. In the Southern Ostrobothnian, Tavastian and southwestern dialects of Finnish, /ð/ mostly changed into /r/, thus the dialects have a synchronic lenition of an alveolar stop into an alveolar trill /t/ → /r/. Furthermore, the same phoneme /t/ undergoes assibilation /t/ → /s/ before the vowel /i/, e.g. root vete- "water" → vesi and vere-. Here, vete- is the stem, vesi is its nominative, and vere- is the same stem under consonant gradation.

== Fortition ==
Fortition is the opposite of lenition: a consonant mutation in which a consonant changes from one considered weak to one considered strong. Fortition is less frequent than lenition in the languages of the world, but word-initial and word-final fortition is fairly frequent.

Italian, for example, presents numerous regular examples of word-initial fortition both historically (Lat. Januarius with initial /j/ > gennaio, with [dʒ]) and synchronically (e.g., /ˈkaza/ "house, home" → [ˈkaːza] but /a ˈkaza/ "at home" → [aˈkːaːza]).

Catalan is among numerous Romance languages with diachronic word-final devoicing (frigidus > */ˈfɾɛd/ > fred [ˈfɾɛt]. Fortition also occurs in Catalan for /b d ɡ/ in consonant clusters with a lateral consonant (Lat. populus > poble [ˈpɔbːɫə] or [ˈpɔpːɫə].

Word-medially, /lː/ is subject to fortition in numerous Romance languages, ranging from [ɖː] or [dː] in many speech types on Italian soil to [dʒ] in some varieties of Spanish.

== See also ==
- Fortis and lenis
- Apophony
- Begadkefat
- Chain shift
- Consonant mutation
- Germanic spirant law
- Grimm's Law
- High German consonant shift
- Historical linguistics
- Rendaku – a similar phenomenon in the Japanese language
- Tuscan gorgia – a specific form of lenition found in the Tuscan dialect of Italian
