= Finns proper =

Tribe of the Finnish people

- Coat of arms of the historical province of Finland Proper

Regions with significant populations
- Southwest Finland and Satakunta

Languages
- Finnish (Southwest Finnish dialects)

Religion
- Lutheranism

Related ethnic groups
- Other regional subgroups

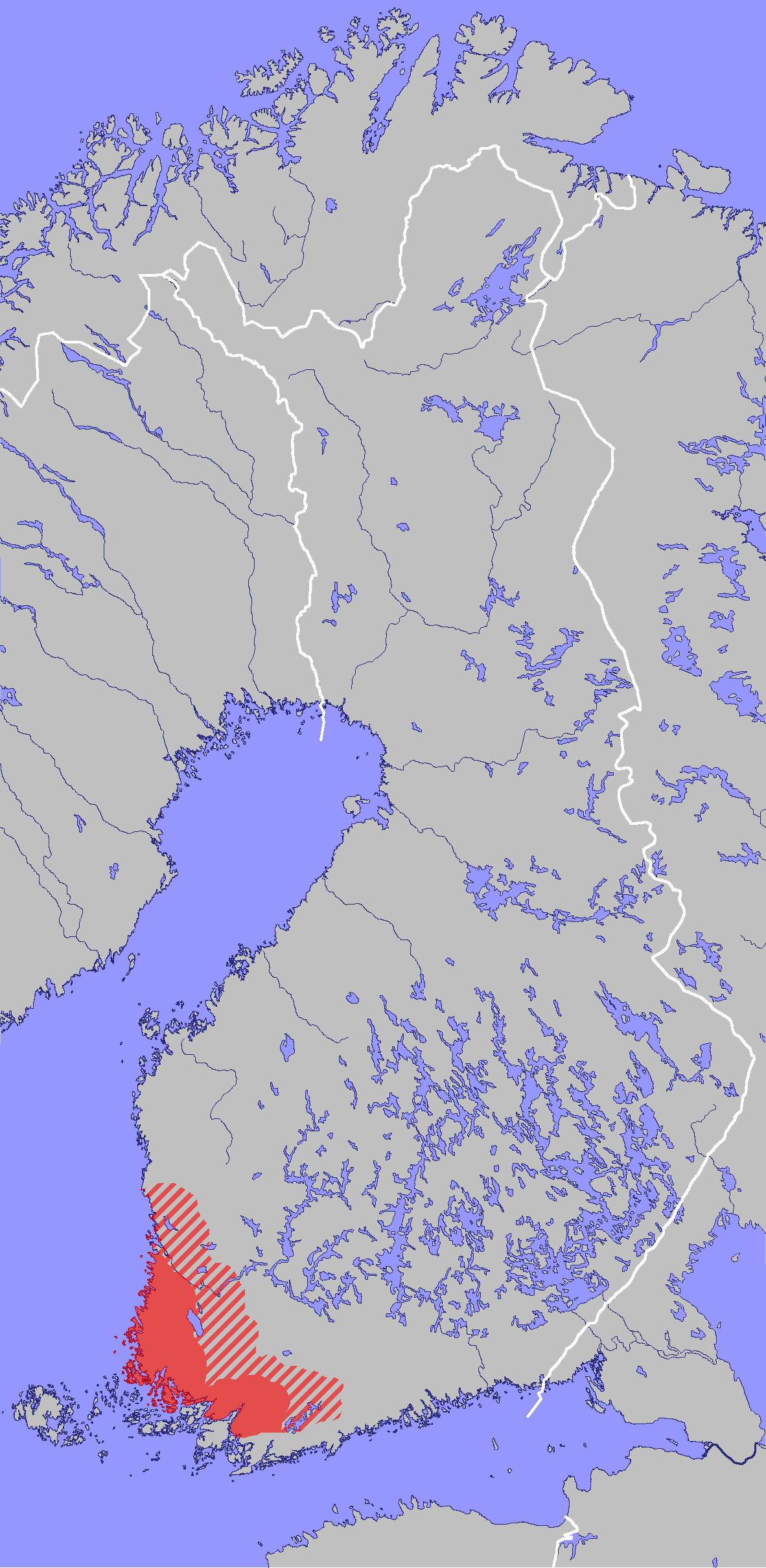
The area where the Southwest Finnish dialects are spoken

Finns proper (Finnish: varsinaissuomalaiset; Swedish: Egentliga Finnar) are a historic people and a modern subgroup (heimo) of the Finnish people. They live in the areas of the historical province of Finland Proper (Finnish: Varsinais-Suomi) and Satakunta, and they speak the southwestern dialects of Finnish. The Finns proper have had strong connections to Scandinavia throughout their history.

== Terminology ==
Originally, the exonym Finland and the endonym Suomi referred only to the southwestern region inhabited by Finns proper. Later, the meaning of these names expanded to refer to the whole area of modern Finland. Earlier, the name Finn meant Sami people, especially in older Norse sagas.

The Russian name sum (сумь), which is derived from Suomi, is believed to refer to Finns proper. The name appears in three entries of the Novgorod First Chronicle and the Sofia First Chronicle, but not in other Russian chronicles, except in references to the Battle of the Neva in 1240, in which the sum were considered allies of the Swedes. In 1318, the Novgorodians were recorded to have occupied the town of Lyuderev, which belonged to the prince and bishop of sum, after crossing the Polna River (identified with the Aurajoki). The Novgorod Fourth Chronicle mentions that the town of Piskupl was also captured, and the inhabitants, called nemtsy ('Germans'), were killed. Like the word yem, which refers to the Tavastians, the name sum disappeared from the Russian language after Finland was incorporated into the Swedish realm.

== See also ==
- Tavastians
- Baltic Finns
- Ostrobothnians

== Sources ==
- Korpela, Jukka (2008). "North-western «others» in medieval Russian chronicles" (PDF). Ученые записки Петрозаводского государственного университета. 2 (93): 42–55. ISSN 1998-5053.
