= Raum (disambiguation) =

Raum is a demon depicted as a crow.

Raum may also refer to:

- Raum Energy Inc., a Canadian wind turbine manufacturer
- Toyota Raum, an automobile
- Raum (album), a 2022 album by Tangerine Dream

== People ==
- Raum the Old, a legendary king of Norway
- Arnold Raum (1908–1999), American jurist
- David Raum (born 1998), German footballer
- Elizabeth Raum (born 1945), Canadian oboist and composer
- Erika Raum, Canadian violinist
- Green Berry Raum (1829–1909), American politician
- Michael Raum (born 1965), German entrepreneur

== See also ==
- Rauma (disambiguation)
