= Ostrobothnians =

Subgroup of the Finnish people

- Coat of arms of the historical province of Ostrobothnia

Regions with significant populations
- South, Central and North Ostrobothnia

Languages
- Finnish (South, Central and Northern Ostrobothnian dialects)

Religion
- Lutheranism (Awakening and Laestadianism)

Related ethnic groups
- Other Finns

Ostrobothnians (Finnish: pohjalaiset, IPA: [ˈpohjɑˌlɑi̯set]) are a subgroup (heimo) of the Finnish people who live in the areas of the historical province of Ostrobothnia in the northwestern parts of Finland.

== History ==
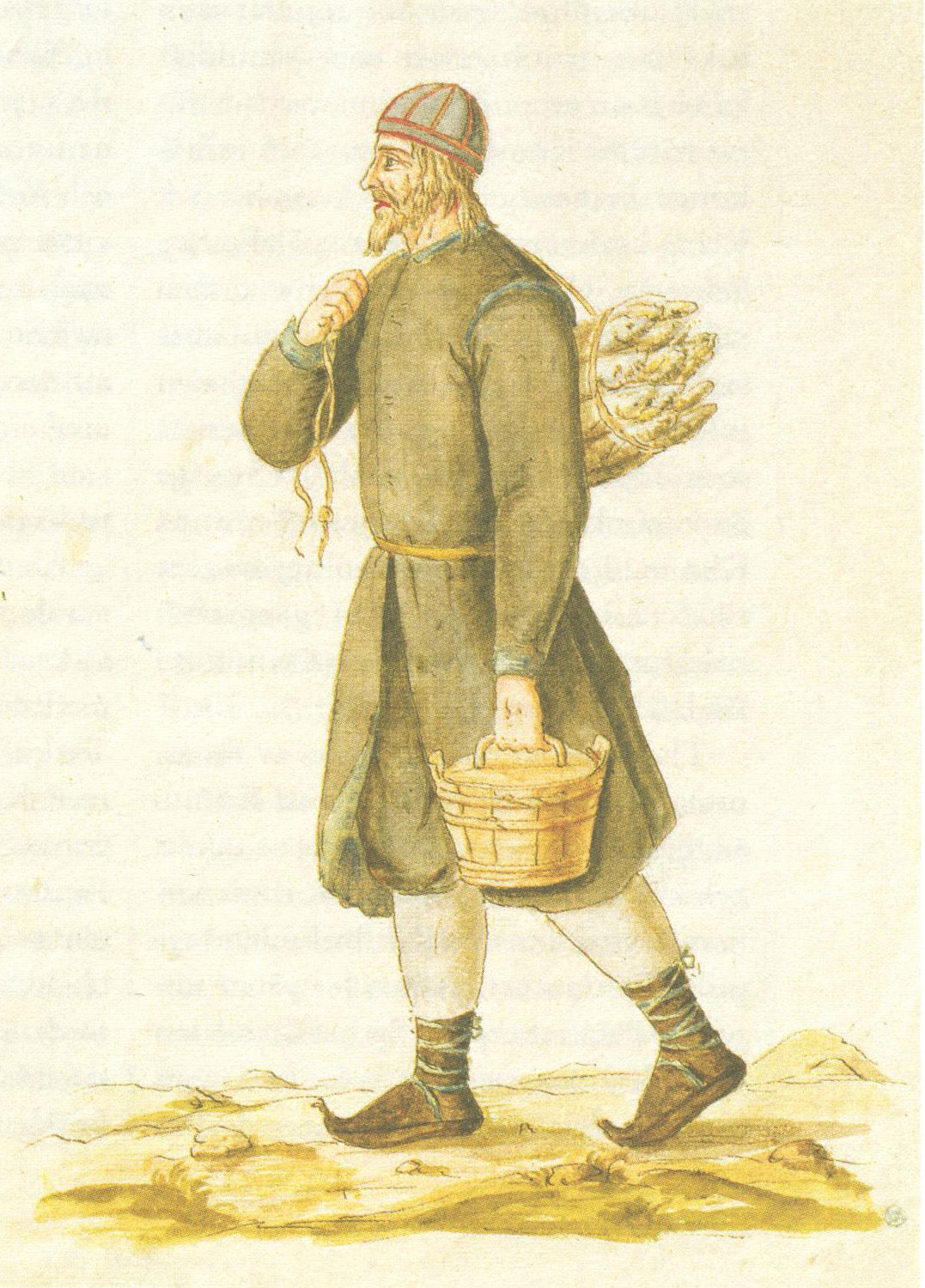
North Ostrobothnian peasant from Oulu.

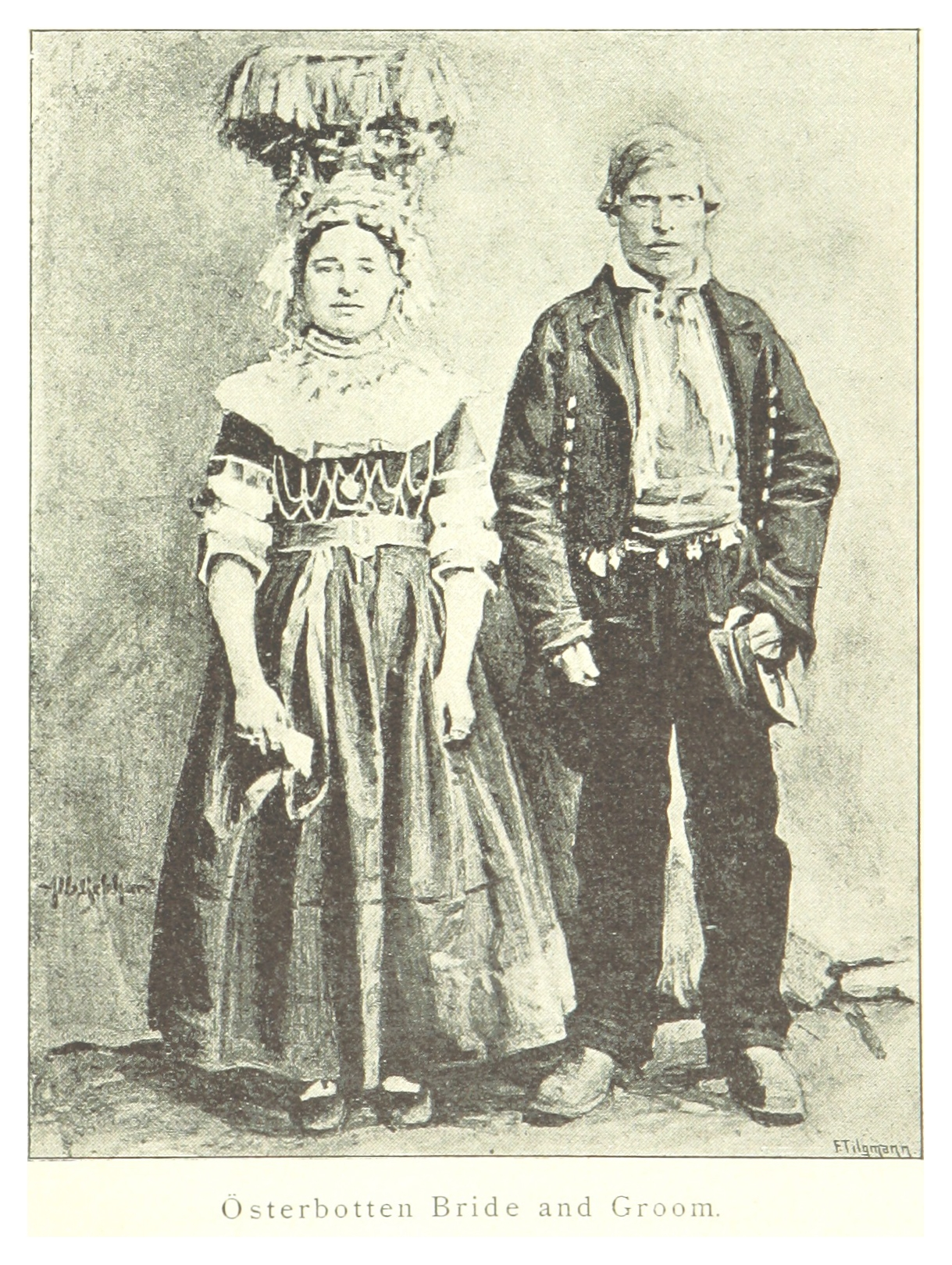
Ostrobothnian bride and groom, drawing from 1894.

Ostrobothnians descend from Tavastians and Savonians, the latter started to settle in Ostrobothnia during the 1500s.

A notable historical event involving the Ostrobothnians is the Cudgel War, in which peasants led by the local rebel leader Jaakko Ilkka rose in a revolt against the nobility during the Swedish rule.

== Dialects ==
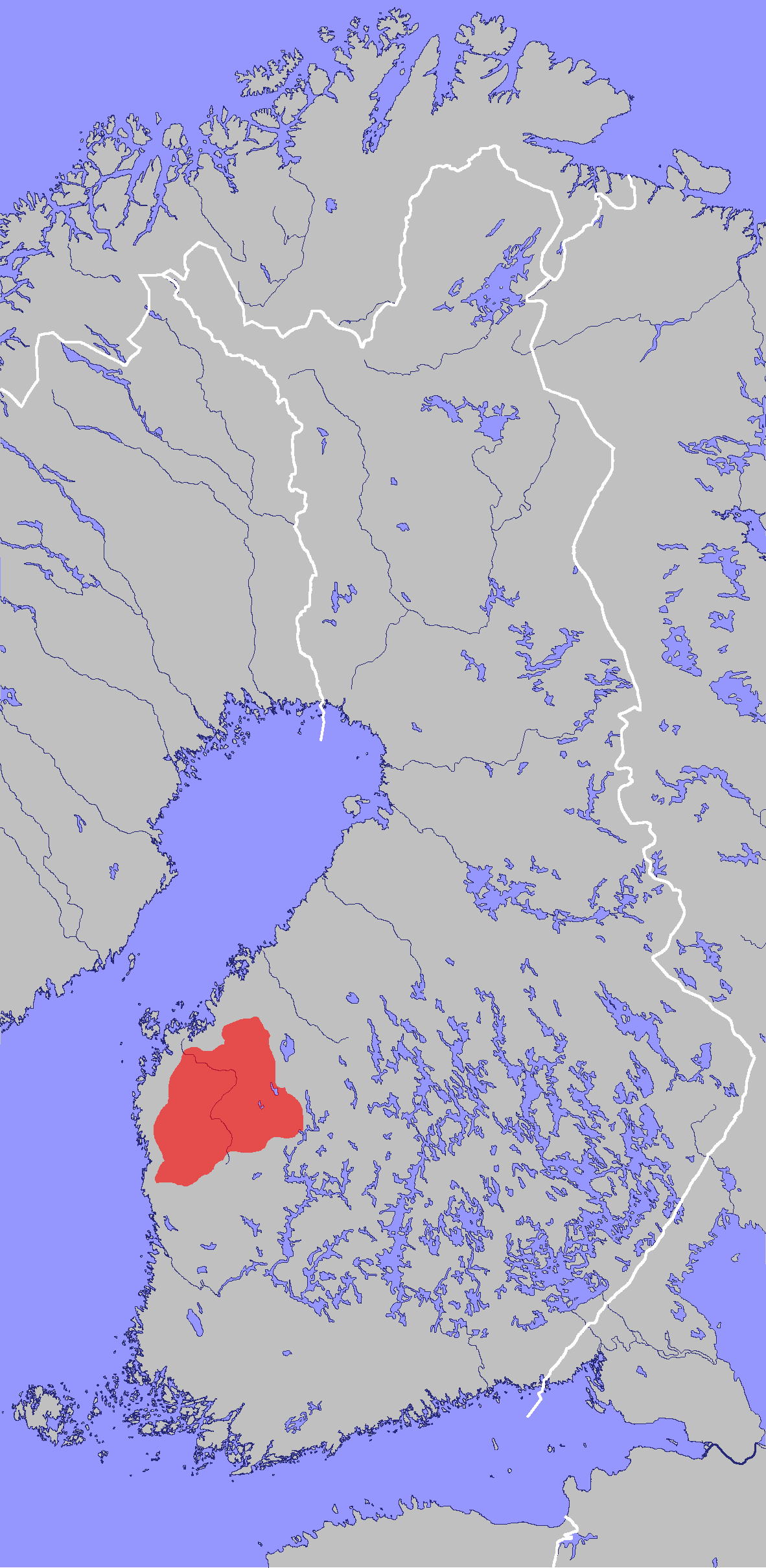
South Ostrobothnian dialect

The South Ostrobothnian dialect is characterized by the changed of /d/ in Finnish to /r/ in Ostrobothnia leh(e)ren (Finnish: lehden, lit. 'leaf's'), the middle vowel in tylysä (Finnish: tylsä, lit. 'boring') and the diphthongs uo, yö and ie changing into ua, yä and iä.

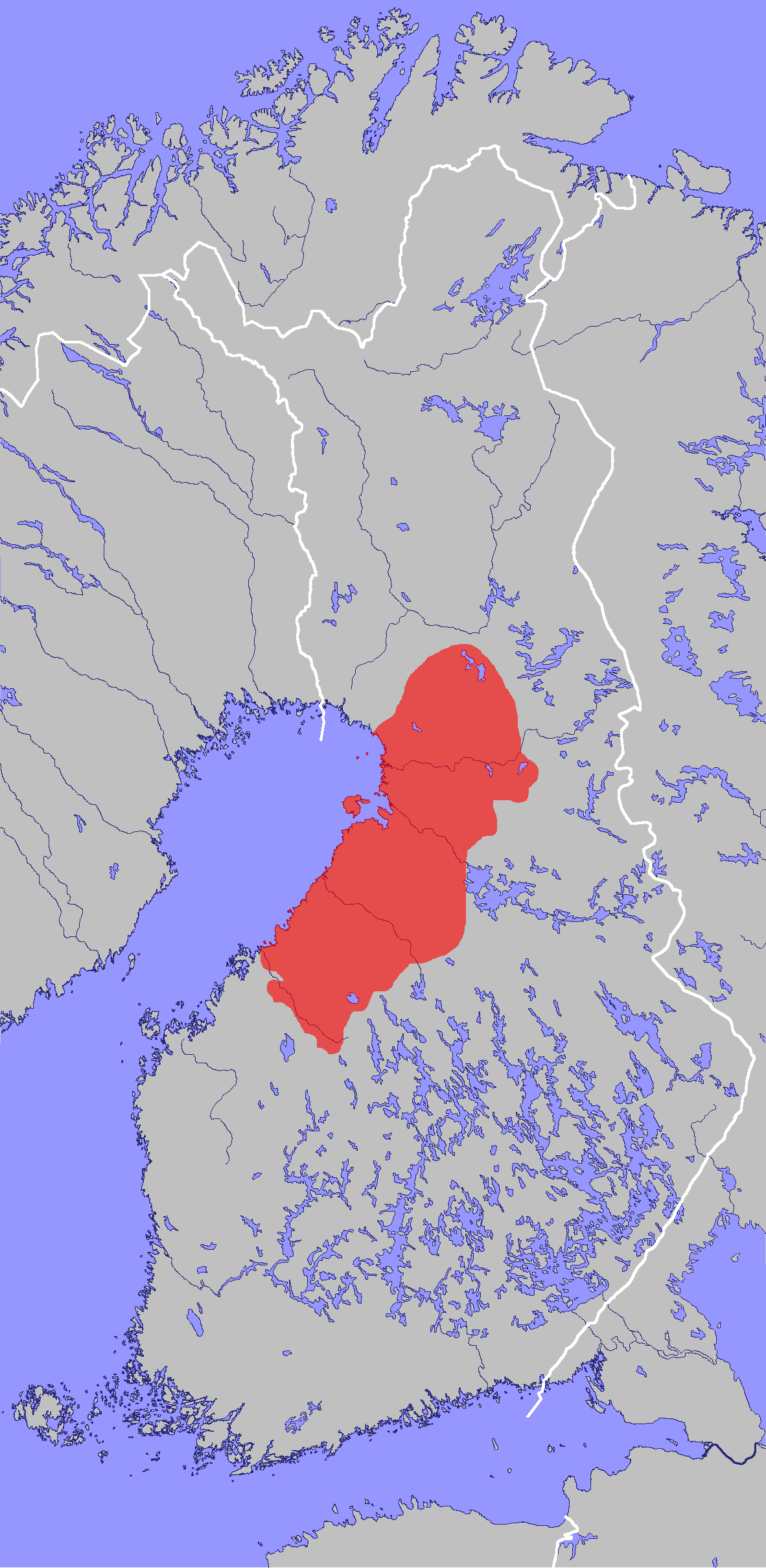
Central and North Ostrobothnian dialects

The Central and North Ostrobothnian dialects have been influenced by the Savonian dialects. They have changed the written Finnish sound of /t͡s/ into /s:/ or /ʰt/ and the vowels -ea and -eä into -ia and -iä.

== Culture ==
=== Descriptions ===
The stereotypical Ostrobothnian is brave, calm and dependable.

=== National dresses and textiles ===
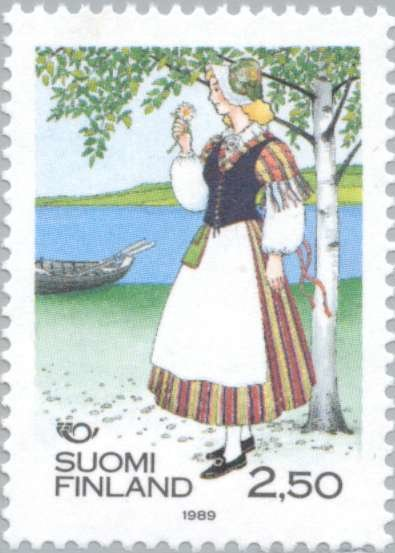
Woman in Veteli national dress.

=== Religion ===
Many Ostrobothnians are either Laestadians, or active in the Awakening movement (körttiläisyys).

== Notable Ostrobothnians ==
- Alvar Aalto, architect and designer
- Heidi Hautala, politician
- Antti Isotalo, criminal and Puukkojunkkari
- Jussi Jokinen, ice hockey player
- Kyösti Kallio, president of Finland between 1937-1940
- Mari Kiviniemi, politician
- Jorma Kontio, harness racing driver
- Petri Kontiola, ice hockey player
- Pekka Korpi, harness racing driver
- Timo Kotipelto, musician
- Vilho Lampi, painter
- Jari-Matti Latvala, rally driver
- Jarppi Leppälä, stunt performer and member of The Dudesons
- Juha Mieto, cross-country skier
- Teemu Mäki, artist and writer
- Antti Niemi, footballer
- Janne Niinimaa, ice hockey player
- Jorma Ollila, businessman and former CEO of Nokia
- Jorma Panula, conductor and composer
- Tero Pitkämäki, athlete
- Erkki Raappana, Major General
- Jukka Rautakorpi, ice hockey coach
- Topi Sorsakoski, singer
- Jutta Urpilainen, politician
- Hannu Väisänen, artist, painter and writer
- Juha Väätäinen, athlete
- Niilo Yli-Vainio, preacher

== See also ==
- Finns proper
- Tavastians
