= Central and Northern Ostrobothnian dialects =

Group of dialects of Finnish

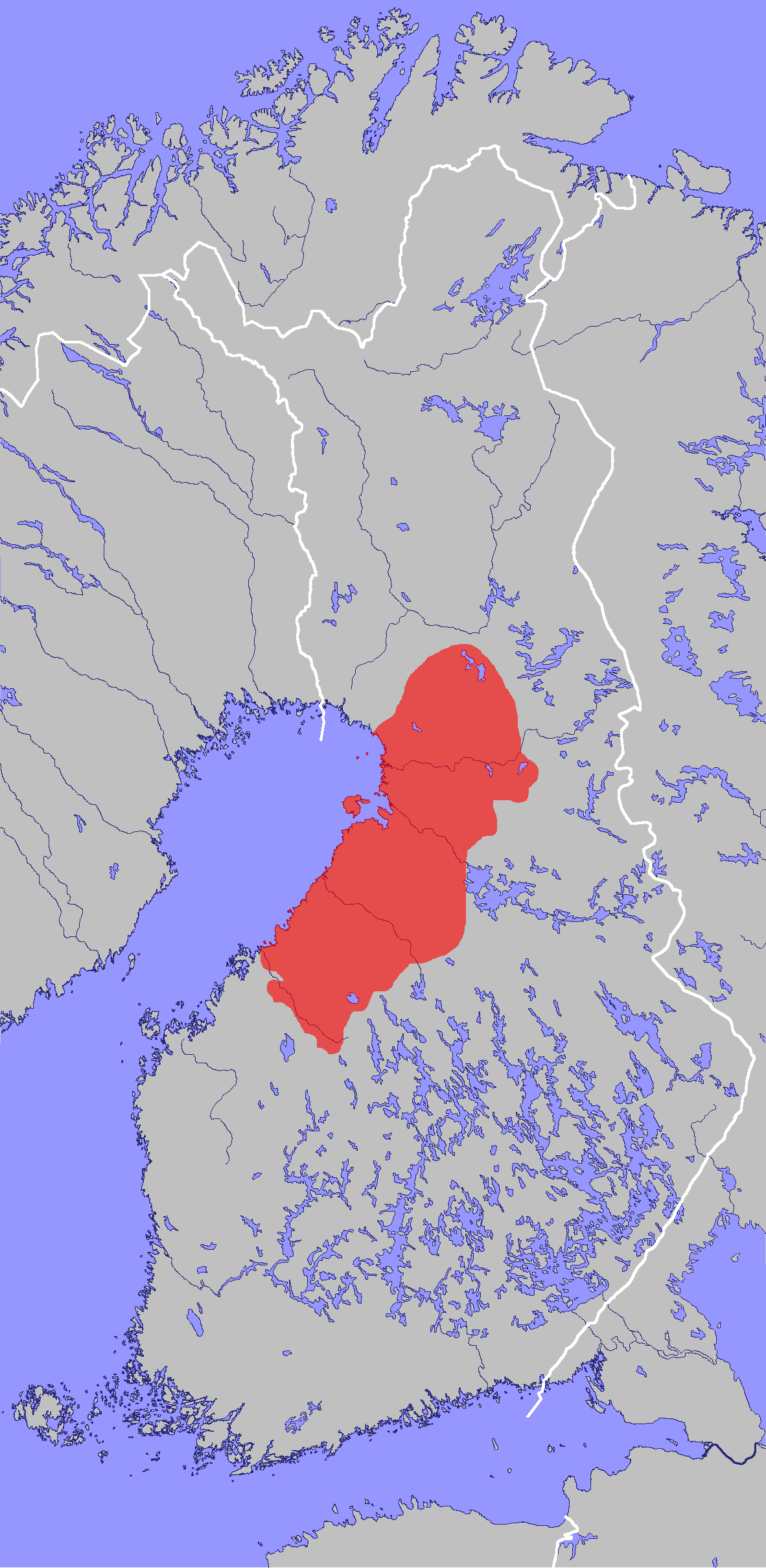
Central and Northern Ostrobothnian dialects

Central and Northern Ostrobothnian dialects (Finnish: Keski- ja Pohjois-Pohjanmaan murteet) are Western Finnish dialects spoken in Northern and Central Ostrobothnia, as well as in the Ranua municipality in Lapland. The dialects have been influenced by the Savonian dialects; the influence is weaker at the coasts and stronger in the inland areas.

== Features ==
=== Pronunciation of standard D ===
While the letter D in standard Finnish makes the sound /d/, this sound is not used in most dialects of Finnish outside of loanwords. In the central and northern Ostrobothnian dialects, D is not pronounced - lehdet (leaves) is pronounced lehet. In some occasions, a /ʋ/, /j/ or /h/ may be inserted in its place, such as syvän, meijät and saaha (as opposed to standard sydän, meidät, saada).

The dialects of Kaustinen, Halsua and Veteli use an /r/ sound in the place of /d/, for example lehdet is pronounced like lehret. This is likely South Ostrobothnian influence, from the times before the Savonian expansion.

=== Pronunciation of standard ts ===
The Northern Ostrobothnian dialects use tt in its place, e.g. metsä (forest) is pronounced mettä. Consonant gradation does not affect it, therefore the genitive of mettä is mettän. The dialects of Utajärvi, Vaala and Ylikiiminki have consonant gradation for this sound, making the genitive in those dialects metän.

The Central Ostrobothnian dialects use the Savonian-like ht-pronunciation, e.g. mehtä. In the western parts of this dialect area, it is unaffected by consonant gradation (genitive mehtän), in the eastern parts it is affected (genitive metän).

The dialects of Kaustinen, Halsua and Veteli use a non-gradated ss here: messä, messän.

=== Diphthongs ===
==== Diphthongs uo, yö and ie ====
These diphthongs are pronounced as ua, yä and iä (e.g. nuari tyämiäs instead of nuori työmies, "young workman") in the city of Oulu and its surroundings all the way to Muhos, Kiiminki and Haukipudas. In this area, the feature is not as strong as it is in the Tavastian dialects, suggesting that this is a fairly late development.

Other Central and Northern Ostrobothnian dialects simply use the same pronunciations as the standard language.

==== Reduction of diphthongs ending in i, u and y ====
Most central and northern Ostrobothnian dialects use the standard pronunciations for these diphthongs. However, reduced forms of these diphthongs (e.g. koira "dog" can be pronounced as koera) may be encountered in an area from Haapajärvi to Ylikiiminki near the Savonian dialectal area, making this an example of Savonian influence.

=== Middle (epenthetic) vowel ===
An epenthetic vowel, usually called välivokaali or loisvokaali in Finnish, is present in all central and northern Ostrobothnian dialects, e.g. kylmä (cold) and lehmä (cow) are pronounced as kylymä, lehemä.

=== /h/ after unstressed syllables ===
The h-sound after unstressed syllables can only be found in the southwesternmost parts of the dialect area. In Lohtaja, Himanka, Kannus and Toholampi it appears as lampahat, tupahan (standard lampaat, tupaan). A syncope form appears in Veteli, Kaustinen, Halsua and Ullava, e.g. lamphat, tuphan.

=== Inessive suffix ===
While in standard Finnish the inessive suffix is -ssa or -ssä depending on vowel harmony, a large part of the central and northern Ostrobothnian dialects use a shorter form -sa, -sä e.g. maasa, kyläsä instead of maassa, kylässä (in a/the land/ground, in a/the village).

Dialects on the eastern edges of the group, such as the dialect spoken in Haapajärvi, do not use this feature and simply use the standard-like maassa and kylässä.

=== -ea and -eä ===
These two vowels in the end of a word are most notably used to end various adjectives. In central and northern Ostrobothnia, these are pronounced as -ia and -iä instead, e.g. korkia and pimiä instead of korkea and pimeä (respectively "high" and "dark").

The dialects of Pudasjärvi and Ranua, however, use the -ea/-eä pronunciations. This may be influence from the dialects of Kainuu.

=== Possessives ===
A shared possessive suffix -nna and nnä, for the first-person and second-person plural exists in some of these dialects, talonna, standard: talomme, talonne "our house, your (plural) house".

=== Pronouns ===
In the city of Oulu the pronoun "nää" is used instead of the standard Finnish second person singular pronoun "sinä".

== See also ==
- Savonian dialects
- South Ostrobothnian dialects
- Peräpohjola dialects
