= Rauma =

Rauma may refer to:

== Places ==
- Rauma, Finland, a town and municipality in the Satakunta region of western Finland
- Rauma Municipality, a municipality in Møre og Romsdal county, Norway
- Rauma (river), a river in the Romsdalen valley in Møre og Romsdal county, Norway

== Vessels ==
- Rauma-class missile boat, a class of Finnish Fast Attack Craft
- HNoMS Rauma, several ships of the Royal Norwegian Navy

== Other uses ==
- Rauma dialect, a dialect of the Finnish language
- Rauma Line, a railway line in Møre og Romsdal county, Norway
- Rauma-Repola Oy (–1991), and Rauma Oy (1991–1999); former Finnish companies, now part of Metso Corporation
- FC Rauma, a football club in Rauma municipality, Norway
- 1882 Rauma, a main-belt asteroid
