= Finnish tribes =

Ancient ethnic groups in what is now Finland

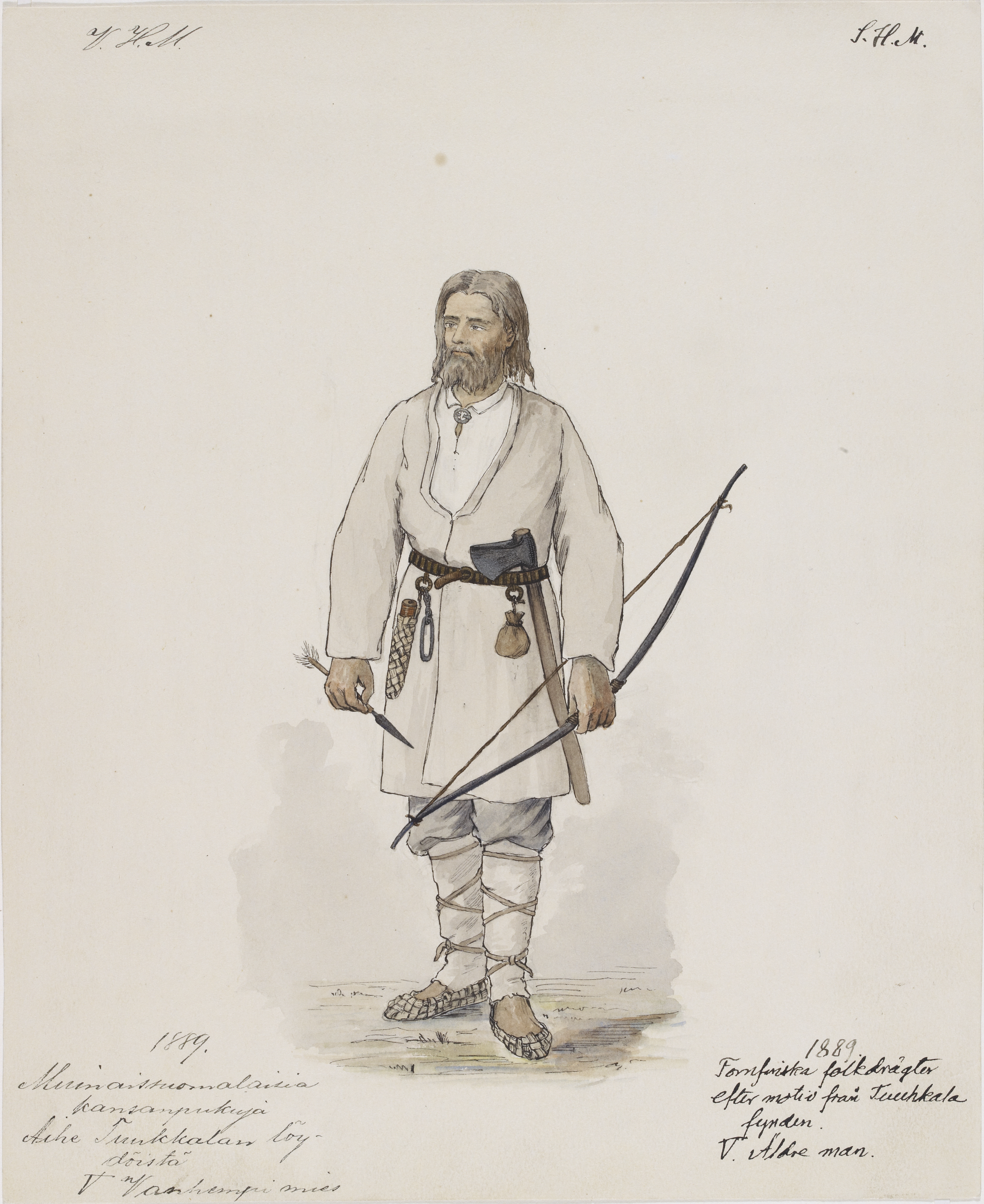
Ancient Finnish men's costume according to finds from the Tuukkala cemetery in Mikkeli. Interpretation from 1889.

Finnish tribes are ancient ethnic groups from which the Finns were formed over time. Today, Finland's tribes are largely mixed as a result of migration. In the preface to the 1548 New Testament, Mikael Agricola mentions the Finns, or Proper Finns, as well as the Tavastians and Karelians, as Finnish tribes. The same regional and cultural division can also be seen on the basis of jewellery worn by women during the Crusade period. On the other hand, by the latter half of the Merovingian period, the metal-object culture of the area of Finland, especially women's jewellery and different weapon types, had developed into something distinctive and possessed more indigenous features than ever before. The aim of this development may have been to express a distinct Finnish identity, which arose from the idea of common origin and mutual similarity.

There are numerous references to Finland's tribes in early historical sources, such as papal letters, the First Novgorod Chronicle and the Eric Chronicle.

== Archaeological sources ==
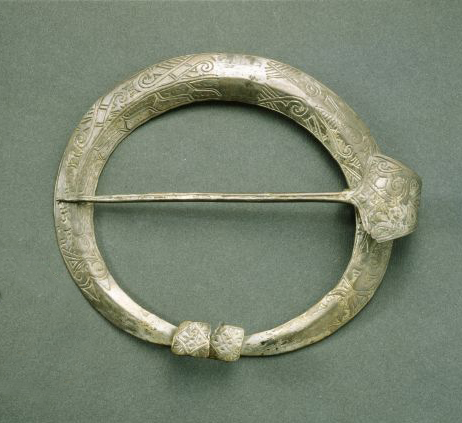
A Western Finnish pin-decorated penannular brooch found in Sortavala. The brooch has been dated to between 1150 and 1300.

On the basis of jewellery worn by women, Finland's Crusade-period cultural areas can be divided into the Southwestern Finnish, Tavastian and Savonian-Karelian cultural areas.

Present-day Southwest Finland, Satakunta and Pirkanmaa formed their own Southwestern Finnish area. Small silver penannular brooches were characteristic of this area. These brooches have been found most commonly in Vakka-Suomi and Ala-Satakunta, but finds have also been made in Tavastia, Karelia and, in some cases, Northern Finland. In Kanta-Häme, the corresponding jewellery consisted of so-called Tavastian-type oval tortoise brooches. In South Savo and Karelia, so-called Savonian-Karelian-type oval tortoise brooches were used. In the Päijät-Häme area lying between these regions, both Eastern and Western Finnish brooch types were used. The distribution of brooch types has been seen as referring to the expression of distinct Finnish, Tavastian and Karelian identities.

== Views on Finnish tribes ==
According to ethnologist Kustaa Vilkuna, there have been six cultural areas in Finland corresponding to the historical provinces of Finland, appearing as vernacular designations and sometimes also as tribes: (Proper) Finland Proper, Tavastia, Kainuu, Karelia, Savo and Lapland. These do not include Satakunta and Uusimaa, which in old vernacular classifications were associated with Tavastia. The tribes corresponding to these designations and associated with Finland's historical provinces would thus have been the Proper Finns, Tavastians, Karelians, Savonians, Ostrobothnians and Lapps.

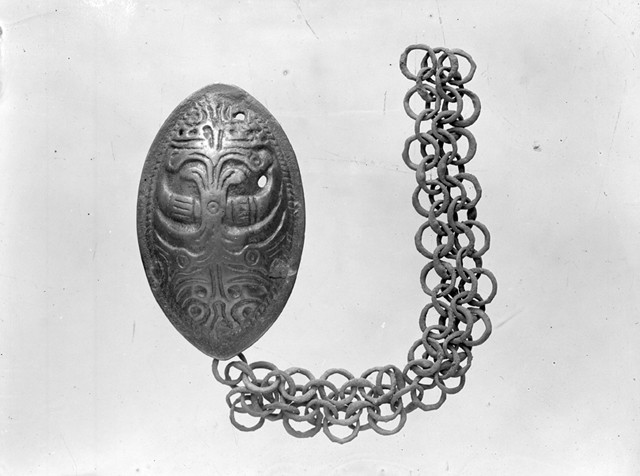
Karelian-type Iron Age tortoise brooch with its suspension chains. The brooch was found in Mikkeli.

Other Finnish subgroups comparable to tribes corresponding to historical provinces have included the Ingrian Finns in the present-day neighbouring areas of Finland; the Äyrämöiset and Savakot, distinguished as historical subgroups of both the Ingrian Finns and Karelians in Karelia and Ingria; the Forest Finns, who lived in Sweden and partly also in southern Norway; the Tornedalians, who still live in Sweden; and the Kvens, or Ruija Finns, who live in northern Norway. Groups of Finns abroad have additionally included the Kola Finns and, farther afield, especially Finnish Americans and subsequently Finns in many other countries.

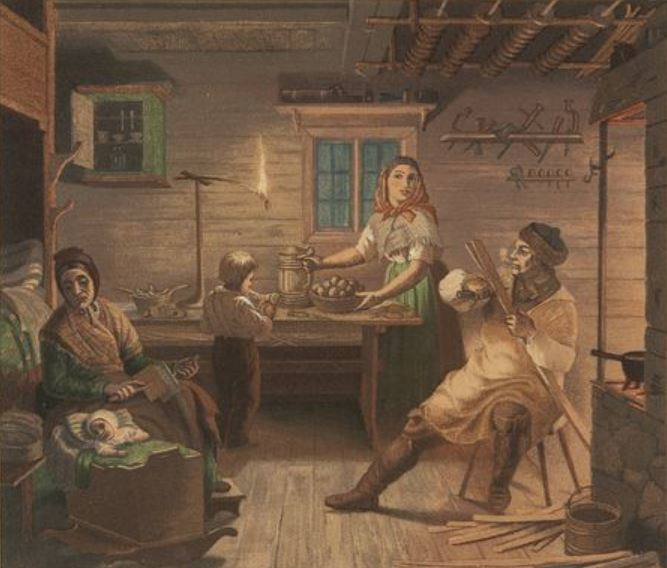
Tavastian folk costumes and evening activities, depicted in 1878.

The principal tribes are the Tavastians, whose roots lie directly among speakers of Proto-Finnic, and the Karelians, who, as their name suggests, are closely related to the Karelians of Russia. The Tavastians inhabited not only Tavastia but also Upper Satakunta and part of Central Finland, although in the latter they were largely displaced by the even more rapidly spreading Savonians. The Southwestern Finns are sometimes counted as a third principal tribe; they arose through the mixing of Tavastians and Estonians who migrated to Finland. The Southern Ostrobothnians are mainly descendants of Southwestern Finns who moved farther north, with a considerable amount of the blood of the Swedish-speaking coastal population also flowing in their veins. Savonians have also contributed, especially in the Järviseutu in the area of the so-called Savonian wedge. The Savonians are a tribe living between the Karelians and Tavastians; genetically, they are closest to the Karelians, but they have also absorbed Tavastian elements. The veins of the Central and Northern Ostrobothnians contain mainly Southern Ostrobothnian and Savonian blood.

Eastern and Western Finns differ from each other genetically more than English and Germans. The difference is also very clearly visible in folk culture and dialects, even without taking the Swedish-speaking population into account. In the west, settled village habitation with field cultivation was characteristic; in the east, a more mobile lifestyle, with hunting expeditions and slash-and-burn agriculture, prevailed. Another difference is that until the end of the 19th century, Western Finns generally used a patronymic (more rarely a matronymic) or a name based on the name of a farm as an additional name, whereas Eastern Finns have used surnames since the Middle Ages. However, the boundary between these areas is not the same in every feature of folk culture and dialect; when the boundaries are drawn on a map, a zone emerges that has many both Western and Eastern features, and this zone clearly separates the distinctly Western Finnish and distinctly Eastern Finnish areas of folk culture and dialect.

== Sources ==
- Georg Haggrén, Petri Halinen, Mika Lavento, Sami Raninen and Anna Wessman (2015). Muinaisuutemme jäljet. Gaudeamus.
