= Frans Hjalmar Nortamo =

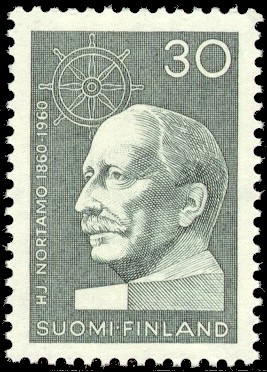
Frans Hjalmar Nortamo

Frans Hjalmar Nortamo (better known as Hj. Nortamo, also known as Nordling; 13 June 1860 in Rauma – 30 November 1931 in Pori) was a writer and a medical doctor who is usually associated with Rauma, Finland, although he also lived in other, neighboring towns and municipalities.

Nortamo is best known for his series of "Raumlaissi jaarituksi" ('Yarns from Rauma'), which was also a name of a book published in 1920. This body of writings has been written in the dialect of Rauma, and they are regarded as the first Finnish language texts that have been actually written in a dialect which is not mainstream Finnish. The dialect of Rauma has a lot of vocabulary that is reminiscent of the old seafaring days and ties with Swedish, English and German speaking countries, and therefore is locally regarded as its own language. Nortamo's writings have been crucial in saving the knowledge of the dialect for the current generations.
