= Ylikiiminki Church =

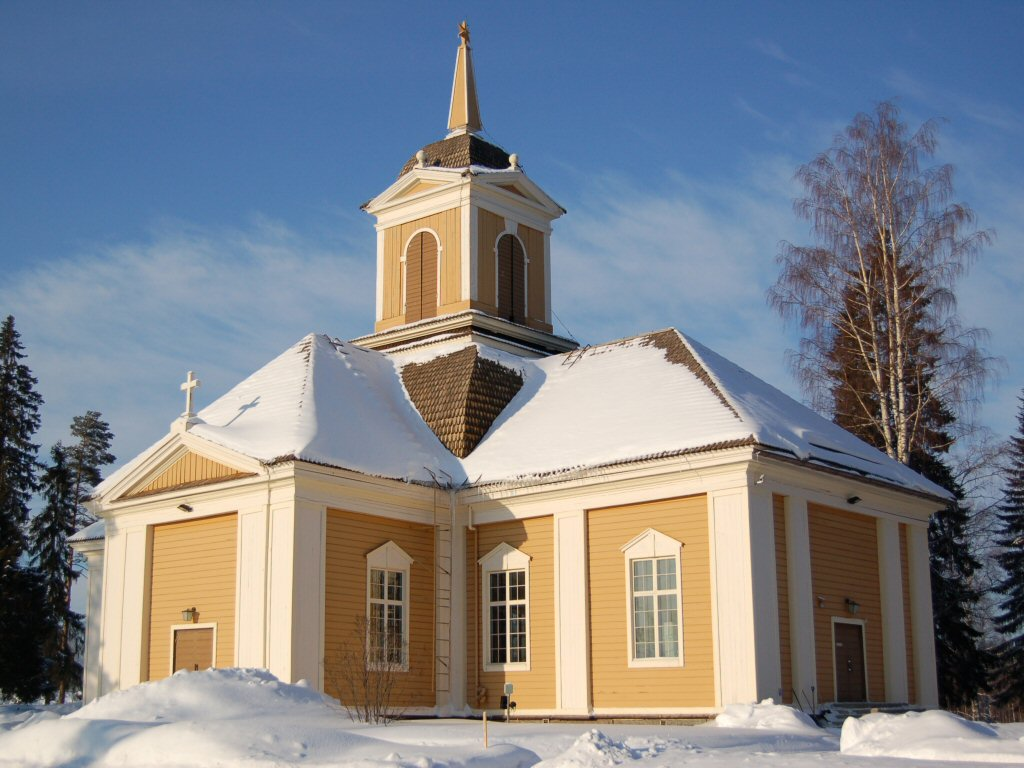
- Ylikiiminki Church
- 65°1.8′N 26°7.6′E
- Location: Ylikiiminki, Oulu
- Country: Finland
- Denomination: Lutheran
- Website: http://www.oulunseurakunnat.fi/ylikiiminginkirkko

History
- Status: Church

Architecture
- Functional status: Active
- Architect: Jacob Rijf
- Style: Neoclassicism
- Completed: 1786

Specifications
- Capacity: 550

Administration
- Diocese: Diocese of Oulu
- Parish: Oulujoki parish

The Ylikiiminki Church (Finnish: Ylikiimingin kirkko, Swedish: Överkiminge kyrka) is an evangelical Lutheran church in Ylikiiminki, Oulu.

The wooden cruciform church has been designed by Jacob Rijf, an Ostrobothnian architect and builder of churches. The church was completed in 1786.
