= Ylikiiminki =

- Former municipality
- Ylikiimingin kunta Överkiminge kommun
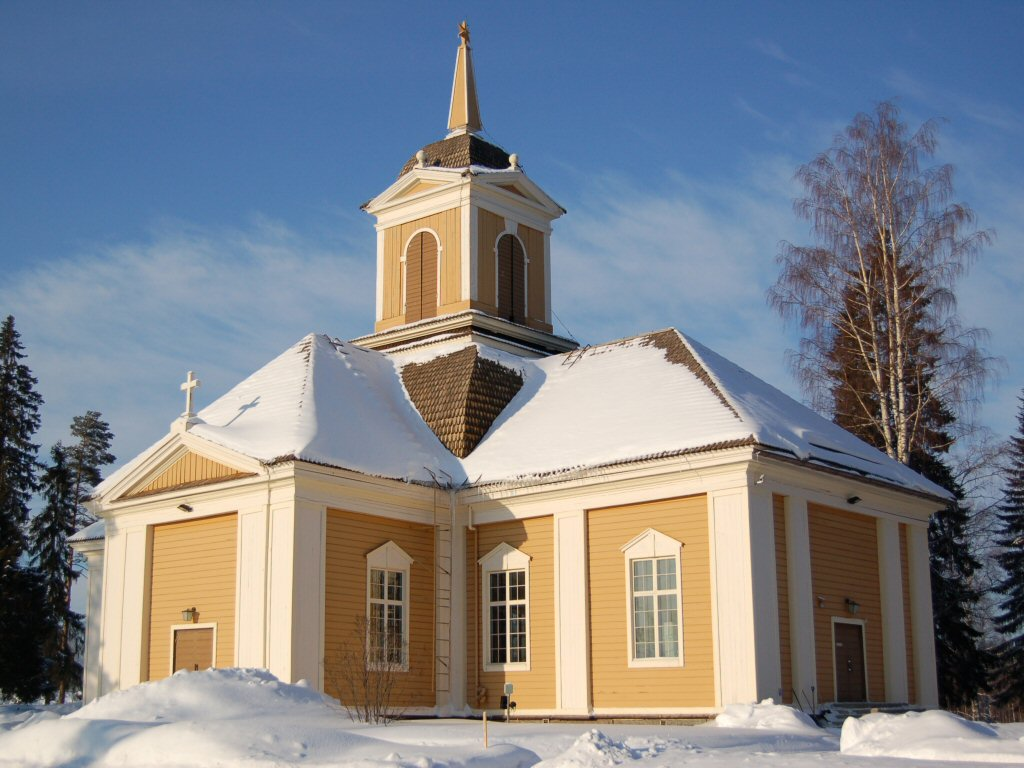
- Ylikiiminki Church, built in 1786.

- Coat of arms

- Location of Ylikiiminki in Finland
- Coordinates: 65°02′N 026°09′E
- Country: Finland
- Region: North Ostrobothnia
- Sub-region: Oulunkaari
- Charter: 1867
- Consolidated: 2009

Area
  - Total: 1,063.9 km^{2} (410.8 sq mi)
  - Land: 1,040.66 km^{2} (401.80 sq mi)
  - Water: 23.24 km^{2} (8.97 sq mi)

Population (2008-12-31)
  - Total: 3,512
- Time zone: UTC+2 (EET)
  - Summer (DST): UTC+3 (EEST)
- Website: www.ylikiiminki.fi

Ylikiiminki (Swedish: Överkiminge) is a former municipality of Finland. It was consolidated with the city of Oulu on 1 January 2009.

It was located in the province of Oulu and is part of the North Ostrobothnia region. The municipality had a population of 3,512 (31 December 2008) and covered a land area of 1,040.66 km^{2} (401.80 sq mi). The population density was 3.37 inhabitants per square kilometre (8.7/sq mi). The municipality was unilingually Finnish.

Neighbouring municipalities were Haukipudas, Kiiminki, Muhos, Oulu, Pudasjärvi, Utajärvi and Yli-Ii. Oulujoki municipality, closed in 1965, was also a neighbouring municipality.
