= Rauma dialect =

Dialect of Finnish

- Rauman giäl
- Native to: Finland
- Region: Rauma
- Language family: Uralic: Finnic; Finnish; Southwest Finnish dialects; Rauma dialect

Language codes
- ISO 639-3: –
- The city of Rauma, where Rauma is spoken

The Rauma dialect (rauman giäl, "language of Rauma") is a Southwestern dialect of Finnish spoken in the town of Rauma, Finland. The dialect is divided into a classical form, and the modern collequial form of Rauma, which is more understandable for other Finnish speakers.

The written form of the dialect was preserved by the writer and doctor Hj. Nortamo, and is currently practiced mainly as a hobby. Some of the most distinctive characteristics of the dialect (as written) are the use of letters 'g' and 'b', which are uncommon in the Finnish language. Pronunciation of these letters is, however, is in between 'g' and 'b' and 'k' and 'p' of mainstream Finnish, and the shortening of words. The Rauma dialect also contains its own pitch accent.

== Status ==
Locally, Rauma is often called Rauman kieli 'language of Rauma', although it is classified as a Finnish dialect, belonging to the Southwestern group of Finnish dialects. In a poll from 2007, most individuals in Rauma believed that Rauma can be called both a dialect and a language. Although in a study, youth from Rauma in speech distinguished Rauman kieli 'Rauma language' from Rauman murre 'Rauma dialect', the former referring to the classical form of Rauma which only a few individuals today use, while the latter referring to the form of speech in Rauma which is today used collequially even by youth, and which is more understandable to other Finns.

The local manner of calling Rauma a 'language' nevertheless may be due to a desire to express the linguistic prestige of the local form of speech, rather than necessarily a literal claim. Kirsi Siitonen, Professor of Finnish at the University of Turku, noted that Rauma is often called a "language" because it has become a standardized written form of speech, however this does not mean that Rauma is classified as a distinct Finnic language, as the distinction between a language and a dialect is often a political question, as with Meänkieli in Sweden.

== History ==
Rauma is only spoken in a very small area of Finland, the Rauma dialect was not influenced by the Tavastian dialects unlike its neighbours, but instead Rauma was influenced by other languages such as Swedish. During the 19th century Rauma was one of the most active sea ports and during that time most Rauma people were working in the sea, which caused them to take words and influence from all over Europe. When the written language of Finnish was created, it was strictly banned to write in Finnish dialects. However it was changed when the writer Hj.Nortamo started writing in Rauma.

Recently, there have been some dictionaries released for the Rauma dialect

Rauma used to have the sound /θ/ and it was even heard at the end of the 20th century. Rauma also had a sound /ð/, however now even in Rauma a sound /r/ has been replacing it.

== Features ==
The Rauma dialect is heavily influenced by Estonian, Swedish, Dutch, German and English, due to maritime influences. The sounds /g/, /b/ and /d/ are very common, and most words get heavily shortened.

== Examples with Finnish and English translations ==
- "San snää mnuu snuuks, snuuks mnääki snuu sno."
  - Finnish: Sano sinä minua sinuksi, sinuksi minäkin sinua sanon.
  - Spoken Finnish of Helsinki area: Sano säki mua suks, suks mäki sua sanon.
  - English: "You should call me 'thou', as I will call you 'thou' too." (Used when dropping titles and starting to use first names.)
- "Ol niingon gotonas"
  - Finnish: Ole kuin kotonasi.
  - Spoken Finnish of Helsinki area: Oo niinku kotonas.
  - English: "Make yourself at home."
- "Luanikast reissu"
  - Finnish: Hyvää matkaa.
  - Spoken Finnish of Helsinki area: Hyvää matkaa.
  - English: "Have a nice journey."
- "Mnää ole Raumalt, mist snää ole?"
  - Finnish: Minä olen Raumalta, mistä sinä olet?
  - Spoken Finnish of Helsinki area: Mä oon Raumalt(a), mist(ä) sä oot?
  - English: "I am from Rauma, where are you from?"
- "Mimne baat snuul o?"
  - Finnish: Minkälainen vene sinulla on?
  - Spoken Finnish of Helsinki area: Millane botski sul o?
  - English: "What kind of a boat do you have?"

== Features ==
Shorter words

ihmettlevä 'they wonder' (Finnish: ihmettelevät)

Shorter vowels

totus 'truth' (Finnish: totuus 'truth')

k, t and p before a nasal consonant.

t becomes d, k becomes g, and p becomes b before a nasal consonant.

tliin dännekkin gattlema 'I also come here to see'

Diphthongs

yö, ie, and uo became: yä, iä and ua.

diphthongs that end in u, y and i have changed into o, ö and e, if the next syllable does not start with: d, r, l, h or v.

kööh 'poor' (Finnish 'köyhä')

Final -t

the ending -t is gone in the Rauma dialect, but it is replaced by: k, t, p, s or f, if the next word is followed by those letters.

poja oliva ilossi 'the boys were happy'.

flikat tahtosivaf fölihi 'the girls wanted into their company'

Plural genitive

In the Rauma dialect, the plural genitive is marked by -tte.
