= HNoMS Rauma =

Two ships of the Royal Norwegian Navy have borne the name HNoMS Rauma, after the Norwegian river Rauma:

- HNoMS Rauma (1939) was an Otra-class minesweeper launched in 1939 and captured by the Germans in 1940. Reverting to Norwegian service after the German capitulation in 1945, she was finally decommissioned in 1959, and scrapped in 1963.
- HNoMS Rauma (M352) is an Alta-class minesweeper presently serving with the Royal Norwegian Navy.
