= South Ostrobothnian dialect =

Dialect of Finnish

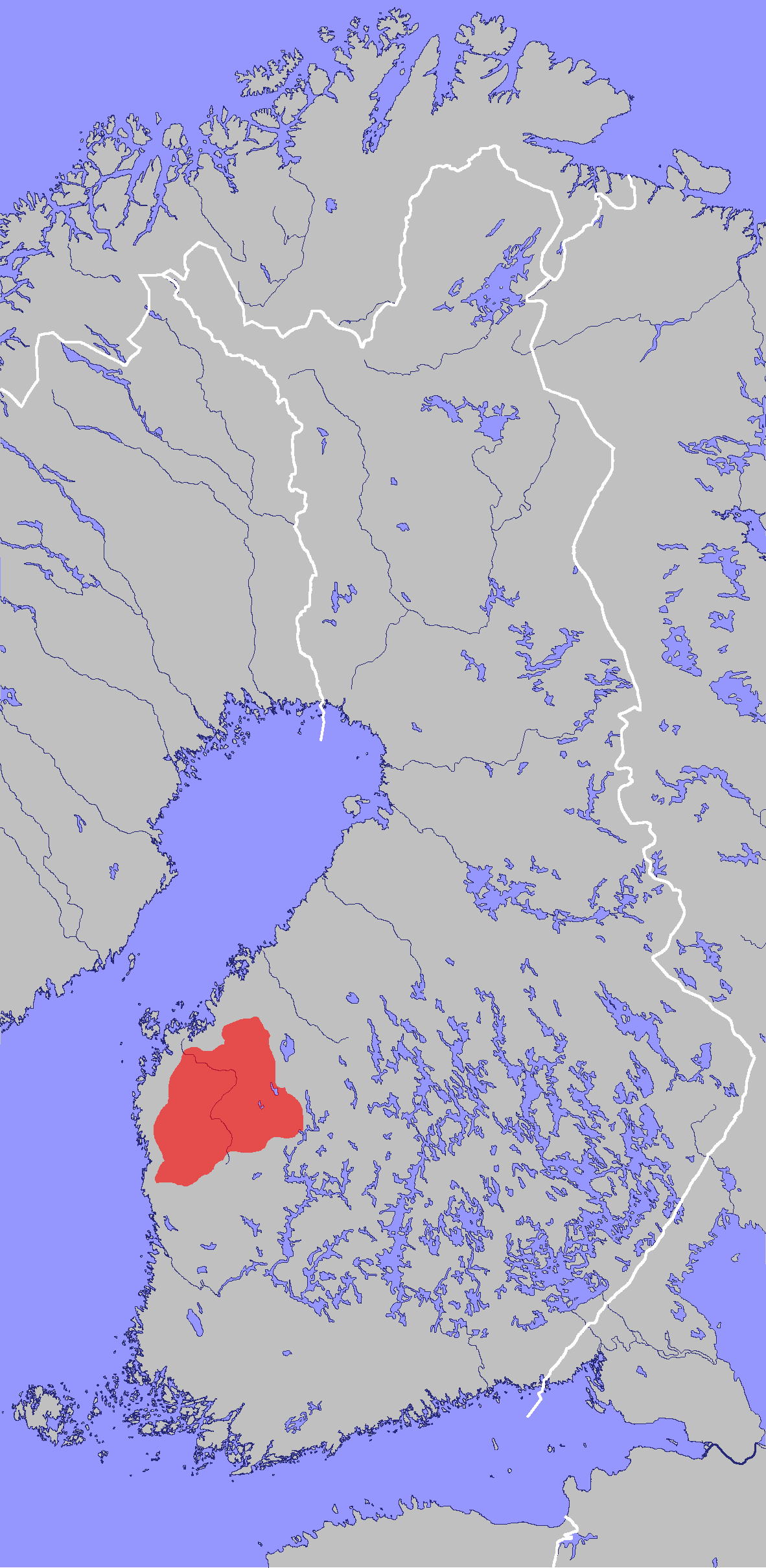
The area in which the South Ostrobothnian dialect is traditionally spoken

South Ostrobothnian dialect (Finnish: Etelä-Pohjanmaan murre) is a Western Finnish dialect. It is traditionally spoken in the region of South Ostrobothnia and parts of Coastal Ostrobothnia. The South Ostrobothnian dialect has many features that are unique to the region of South Ostrobothnia.

South Ostrobothnian is surrounded by 4 different forms of speech, Savonian, Tavastian, Southwestern Finnish (Northern Satakunta) and Swedish. Savonian has mainly influenced eastern South Ostrobothnian, Tavastian has influenced southeastern South Ostrobothnian and western South Ostrobothnian was influenced more by Swedish.

== Features ==
Written Finnish /d/ has changed into /r/
saara "get" (Written: saada)
Written Finnish ts is tt
mettä "forest" (Written: metsä)
Diphthongs
uo, yö and ie are ua, yä and iä in the northern regions of South Ostrobothnian - nuari "young" (Written: nuori)
Middle vowel
tylysä "boring" (Written: tylsä)
Inessive ending
maas(s) "in the ground" (Written: maassa)
Vowel i-
i- in written Finnish is replaced by a long vowel - keltaanen "yellow" (Written: keltainen)
Consonant gradiation
jalka - jalaat "foot" - "feet" (Written: jalka - jalat)
Verb conjugation
tuomma "we bring" - toimma "we brought" (Written: tuomme - toimme), tuutta "you come" - tulitta "you came" (Written: tulette - tulitte)

== Vocabulary ==
- fiini 'nice' (Written: hieno)
- (f)likka 'girl' (Written: tyttö)
- friiari 'suitor' (Written: kosija)
- föli(j)ys 'with' (Written: mukana)
- hantuuki 'hand towel' (Written: käsipyyhe)
- (k)lasi 'window' / silimä(k)lasit 'eyeglasses' (Written: ikkuna/silmälasit )
- kranni 'neighbour' (Written: naapuri)
- kränä 'quarrel' (Written: riita)
- notta/niij jotta 'so that' (Written: niin, että)
- perna 'potato' (Written: peruna)
- pirättää 'stop' (Written: pidättää)
- praatata 'chat' (Written: jutella)
- pruukata 'be used to' (Written: olla tapana )
- pöröttää 'reverse' (Written: peruuttaa)
- moon 'I am' (Written: (minä) olen)
- soot 'you are' (Written: (sinä) olet)
- son 'he/she/"it" is' (Written: hän/"se" on )
- moomma 'we are' (Written: (me) olemme )
- tootta 'you are' (Written: (te) olette)
- non 'they are' (Written: he/"ne" ovat)

== Example ==
Example from Kurikka, 11.6.1965

Kuinkas sitä maata silloon vilijeltihin, kun te sellaanen pieni poika vielä olit(ta)?
– No, ei silloon ollu, sitten apulannoosta juuri mitää tietua vielä. Joku taloollinen osti luujauhoja, mutta torpparit ei niitä pystyny ostamahan. Luujauho, soli ensimmäänen apulanta, mitä minä muistan, joton käytetty.

Written: Kuinka maata viljeltiin silloin, kun olit(te) vielä pieni poika?
– No, ei silloin ollut apulannoitteista vielä juuri mitään tietoa. Joku talollinen osti luujauhoja, mutta torpparit eivät niitä pystyneet ostamaan. Luujauho oli ensimmäinen apulannoite, mitä muistan käytetyn.

Approximate English translation:

How did people farm the land when you were still such a small boy?
– Well, there wasn't hardly any information about artificial fertilizers at the time yet. Some houseowner bought bone powder, but tenant farmers could not buy them. The bone powder, it was the first kind of artificial fertiliser I remember was used.

== See also ==
- Ostrobothnians
- Central and Northern Ostrobothnian dialects
