= Toyota Raum =

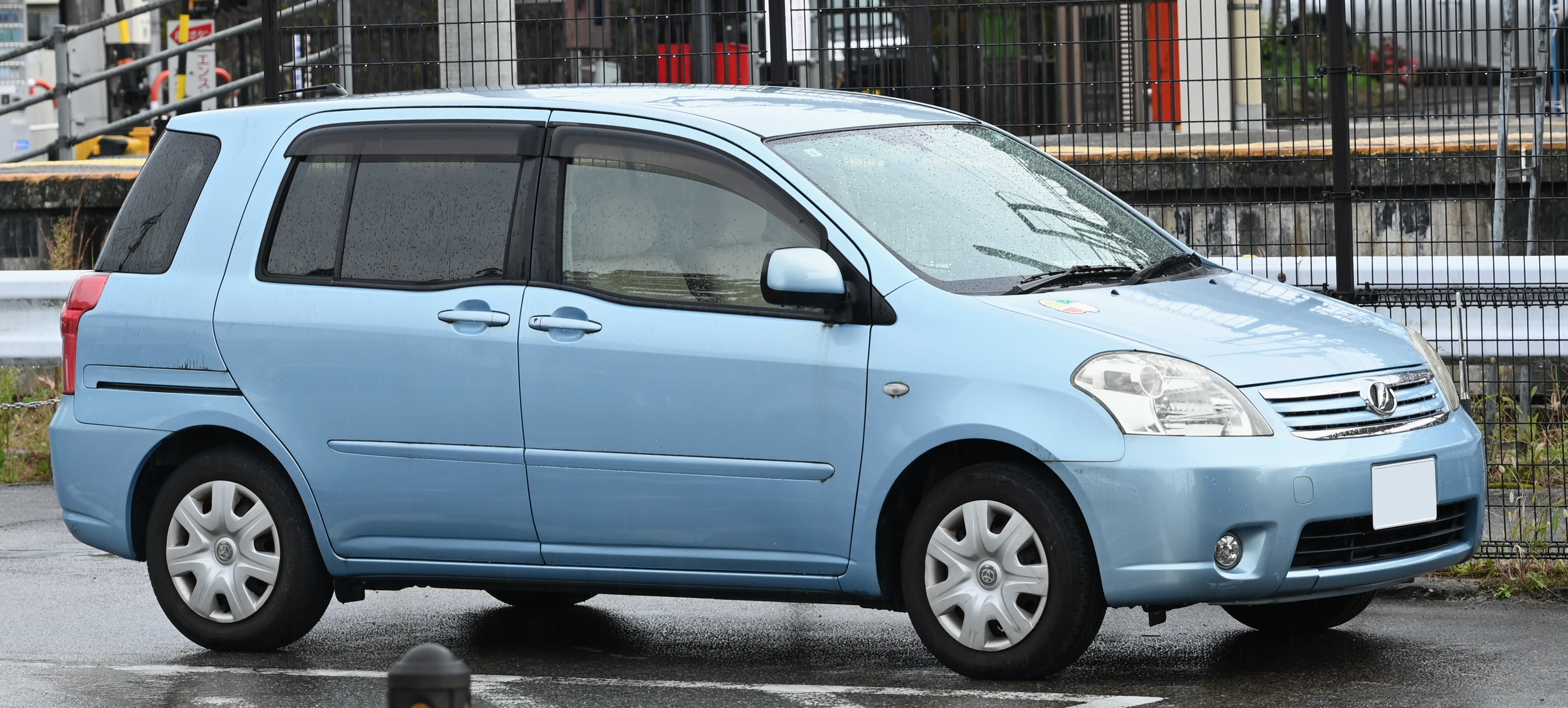
- 2006–2011 Toyota Raum (facelift)

Overview
- Manufacturer: Toyota
- Production: May 1997 – March 2011; 332,675 units
- Assembly: Japan: Sagamihara, Kanagawa (Central Motors)

Body and chassis
- Class: Mini MPV
- Body style: 5-door minivan
- Layout: Front-engine, front-wheel-drive; Front-engine, four-wheel-drive
- Related: Toyota ist; Toyota Vitz; Toyota Platz; Toyota Belta

Chronology
- Successor: Toyota Spade

The Toyota Raum is 5-seater mini MPV that first appeared in May 1997. The second generation was released in May 2003. It was sold only in Japan at Toyota Netz retail sales channels.

The vehicle's name is German for chamber, berth, room, space, expanse, scope, area, or sphere and attempts to emphasize the vast amount of space it contains relative to its size. This is because the front doors on both the driver and passenger sides open conventionally, but the rear doors slide open rearward and attach to the top and bottom of the door openings and interlock to the front doors. The Raum uses a similar door approach also used on the first-generation Mitsubishi RVR/Space Runner.

There is no doorjamb between the front and rear doors that the doors attach to on the passenger side, and the passenger front seat folds flat upon itself (seat type could be chosen based on the variant) and then can be folded forward while still being attached to the floor at the front bottom of the seat. The rear seats can be folded flat with a 60:40 split or can also be folded forward individually for a rear flat cargo floor.

The automatic transmission gear selector is dashboard mounted, thereby freeing up the flat floor space between the front seats, allowing movement to the back seat from inside the vehicle.

== First Generation (XZ10; 1997–2003) ==
First generation (XZ10)
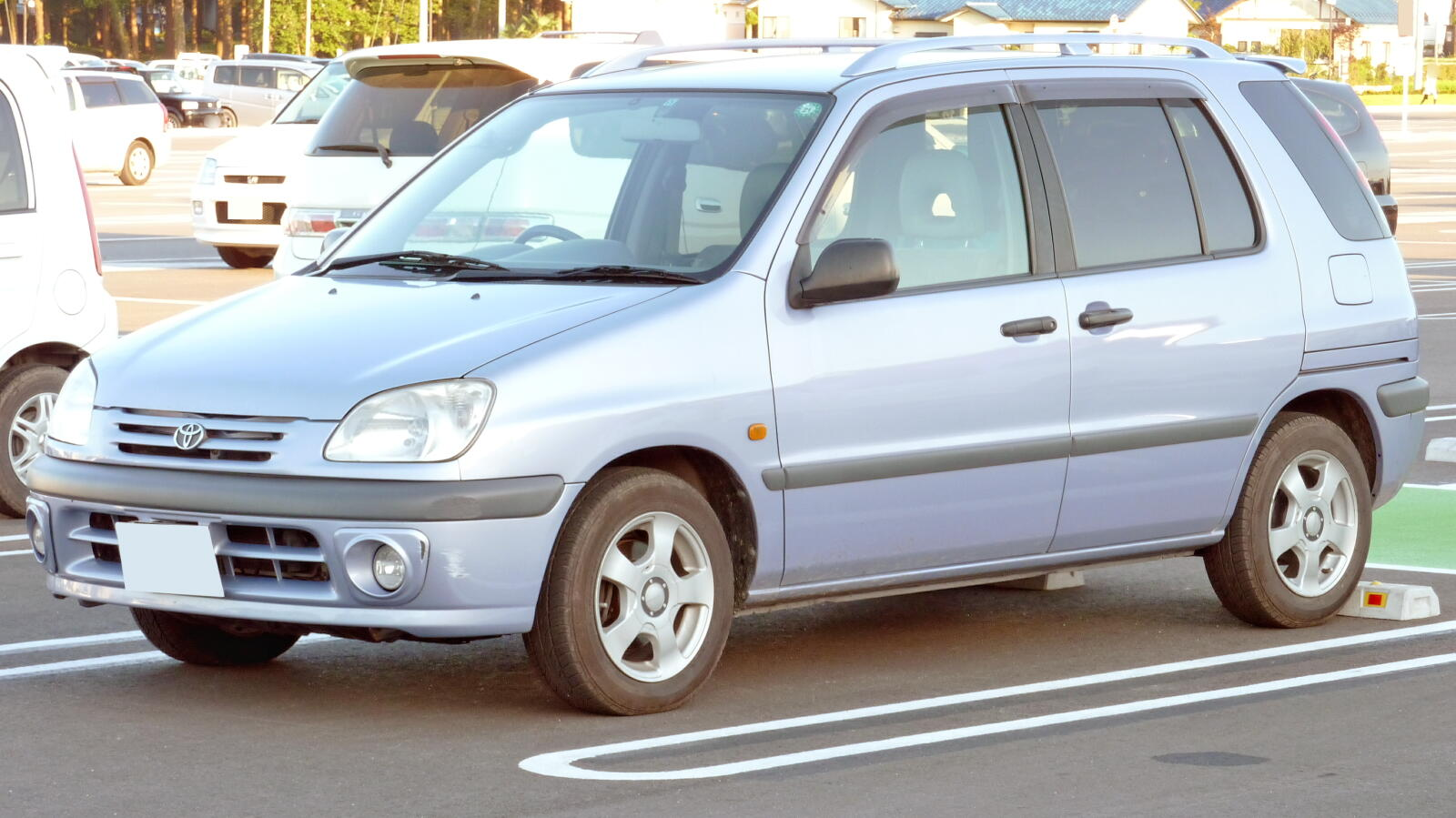
- Pre-facelift Toyota Raum

Overview
- Production: May 1997 – May 2003

Powertrain
- Engine: 1.5 L 5E-FE
- Transmission: 4-speed automatic

Dimensions
- Wheelbase: 2,520 mm (99 in)
- Length: 4,025 mm (158.5 in)
- Width: 1,685 mm (66.3 in)
- Height: 1,590 mm (63 in)
- Curb weight: 1,090 kg (2,400 lb)

The development for the first generation Raum was led by Toyota chief engineer Tetsuya Tada. The model had 5 variants or grades; base, C, E, G, and S. The Raum was equipped with EBD brakes on top level G and E packages, with a later addition to the C package. A minor facelift was released in August 1999.

It had a distinctive tall and boxy design, providing ample interior space while maintaining a small footprint suitable for city driving. Its unique styling included large windows, a high roofline, and a rear-mounted spare tire, giving it a practical and modern appearance. In addition, it was equipped with fuel-efficient inline-four cylinder engines, offering decent performance for urban driving conditions. While not very powerful, these engines are well suited to the purpose of the car for city travel and occasional highway driving.

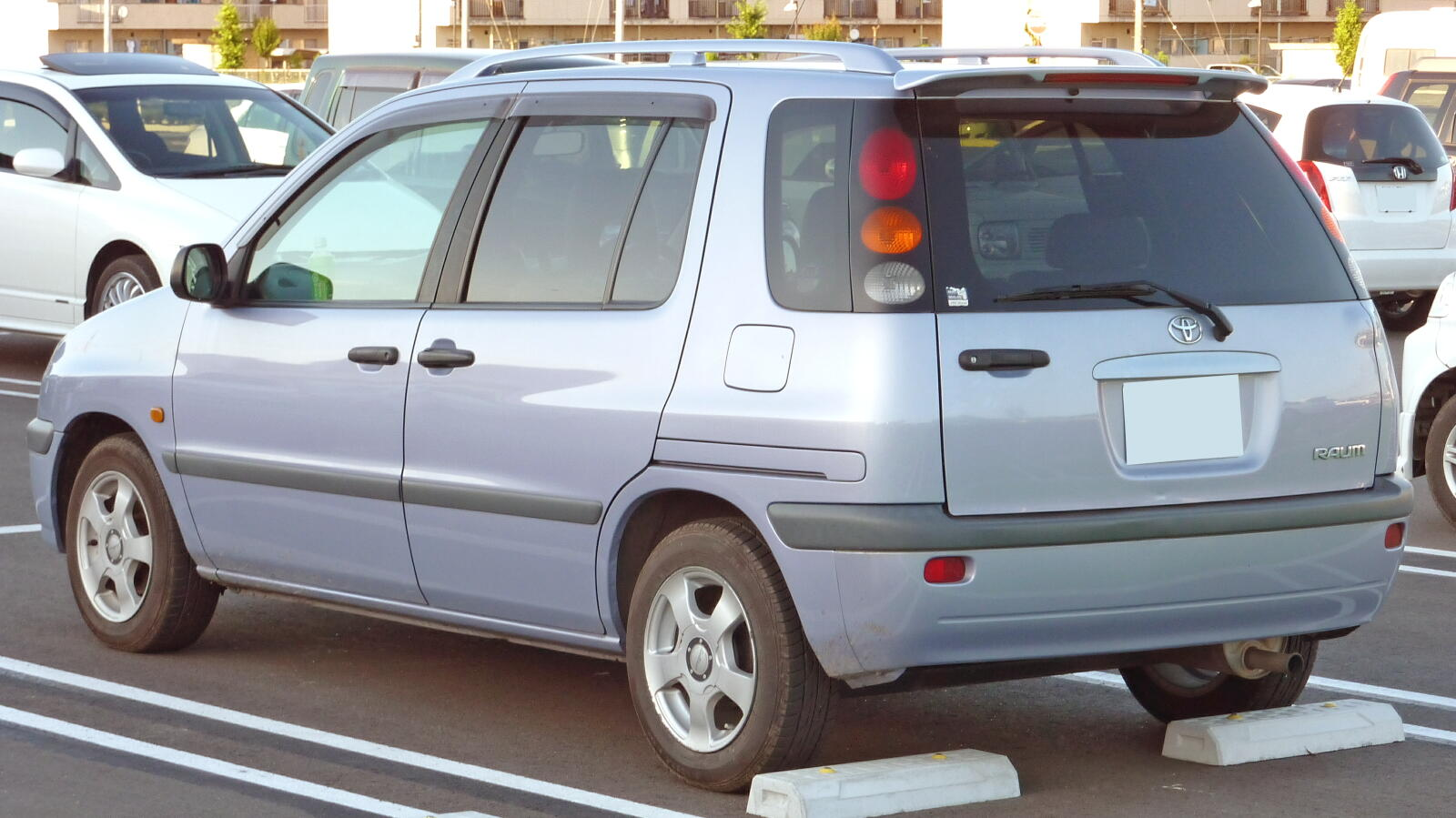
Pre-facelift Toyota Raum

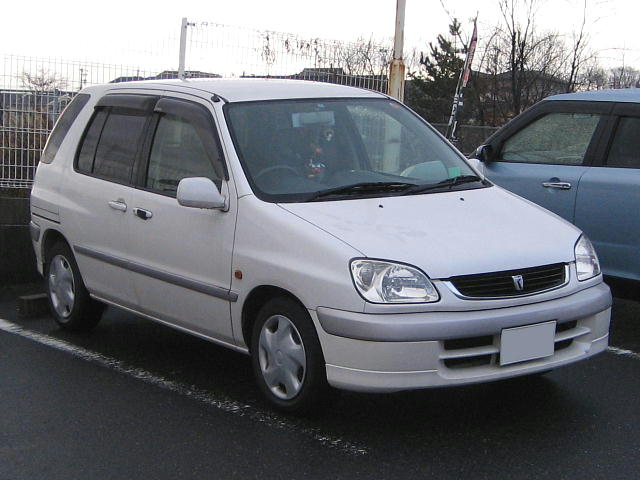
Facelift Toyota Raum

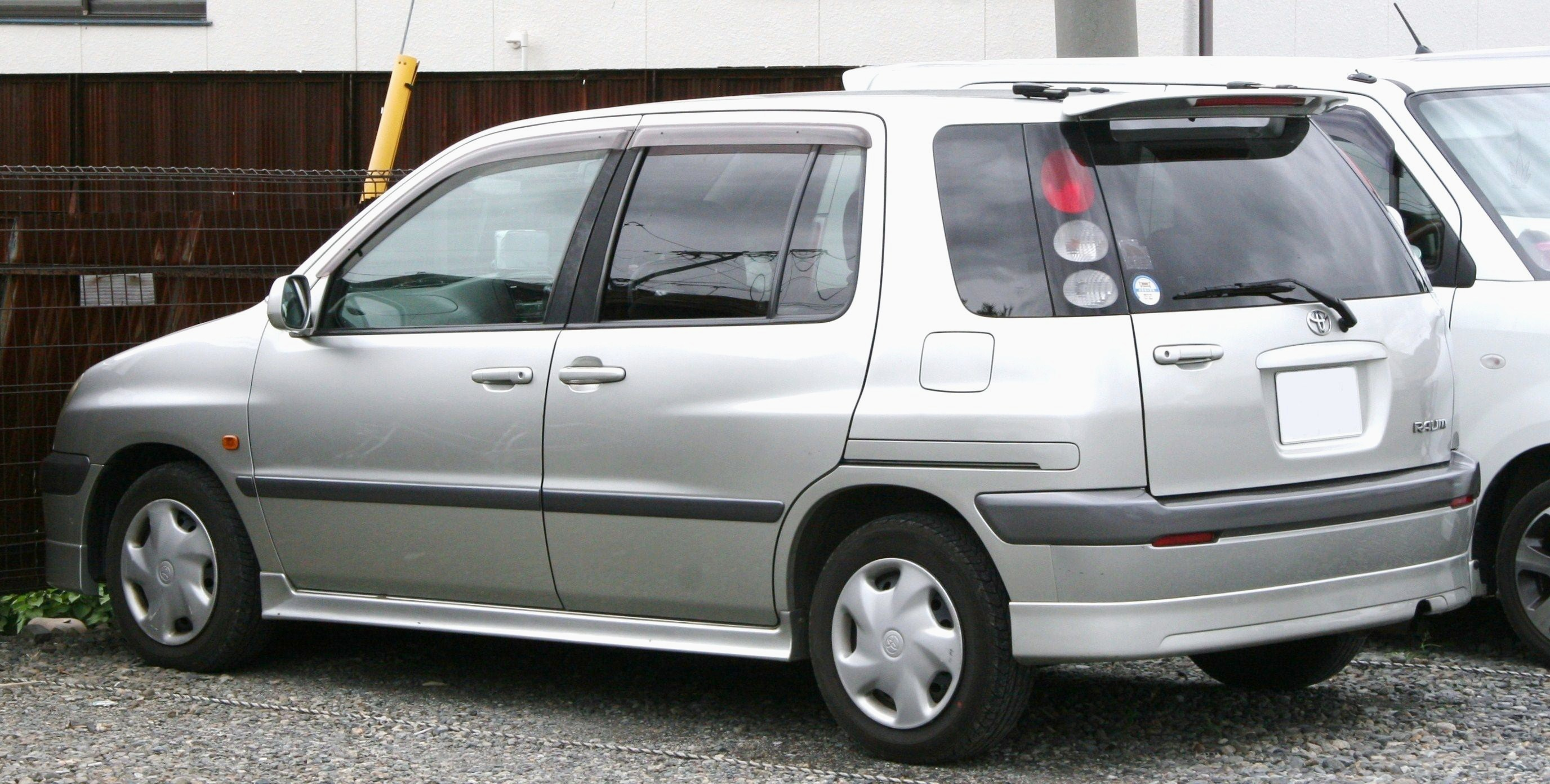
Facelift Toyota Raum

== Second Generation (XZ20; 2003–2011) ==
Second generation (XZ20)
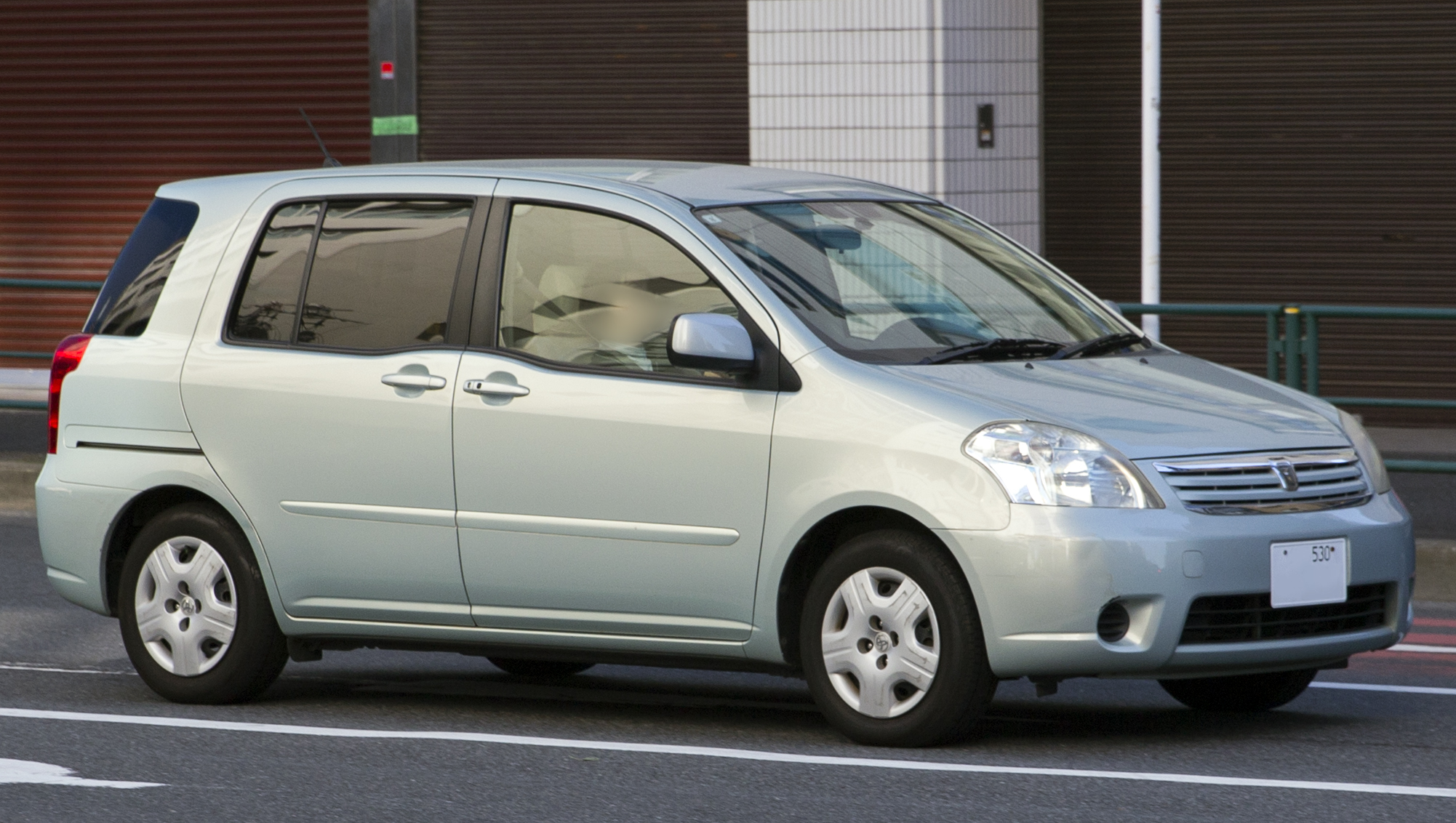
- Pre-facelift Toyota Raum

Overview
- Production: May 2003 – March 2011
- Assembly: Ōhira, Miyagi (Central Motors)

Body and chassis
- Platform: Toyota NBC platform

Powertrain
- Engine: 1.5 L 1NZ-FE VVT-i
- Transmission: 4-speed automatic (Super-ECT)

Dimensions
- Wheelbase: 2,500 mm (98 in)
- Length: 4,045 mm (159.3 in)
- Width: 1,690 mm (67 in)
- Height: 1,545 mm (60.8 in)
- Curb weight: 1,150–1,220 kg (2,540–2,690 lb)

Previewed as ALSV concept car that showcased at 2002 Tokyo Motor Show. The complete body change was released on May 12, 2003, and shared the platform with the Toyota Vitz. Side impact protection was further enhanced. The passenger side rear door can be opened electronically and by remote control key fob. The engine used in the second-generation model is shared with the Toyota Prius.

On October 20, 2003, the vehicle won the Universal Design Prize, a special prize under the Japan Good Design Award, with a special mention for people with physical disabilities. A special edition called the C Package NEO Edition (NEW ERA OPENING) was added in 2004, including discharge headlamps and a grey, all-fabric interior. All other Raums of this generation have a beige interior.

The DVD navigational system was upgraded to HDD on December 5, 2006, which is when the Raum also underwent a light facelift: the front emblem was changed from the original "R" (for Raum) to a stylized "N", for the "Netz" distribution network. The rear combination lamps were also changed, going from three round lights to a square-round-square motif. The design of the full wheel caps for 14-inch steel wheels was changed, becoming the same as that of the contemporary E120 Corolla sedan. Two colors were discontinued while three new body colors were added. Front fog lamps and LED brake lights became standard equipment on all versions, which meant that the "C Package" was discontinued as it essentially became the standard specification. On January 7, 2009, an in-car cabin air filter and HID headlamps were added.

For 2007 on Japanese models only, G-BOOK, a subscription telematics service, is offered as an option. Production ended in March 2011 without a direct successor.

The front passenger seats on a Toyota Raum can be folded forward to allow passengers easier access to back seats, or can be used for rear passengers foot rest. To fold it out of the way, the front passenger seat must first be slid back as far as possible, after which lifting the latch on the side of the seat allows it to be folded all the way forward.

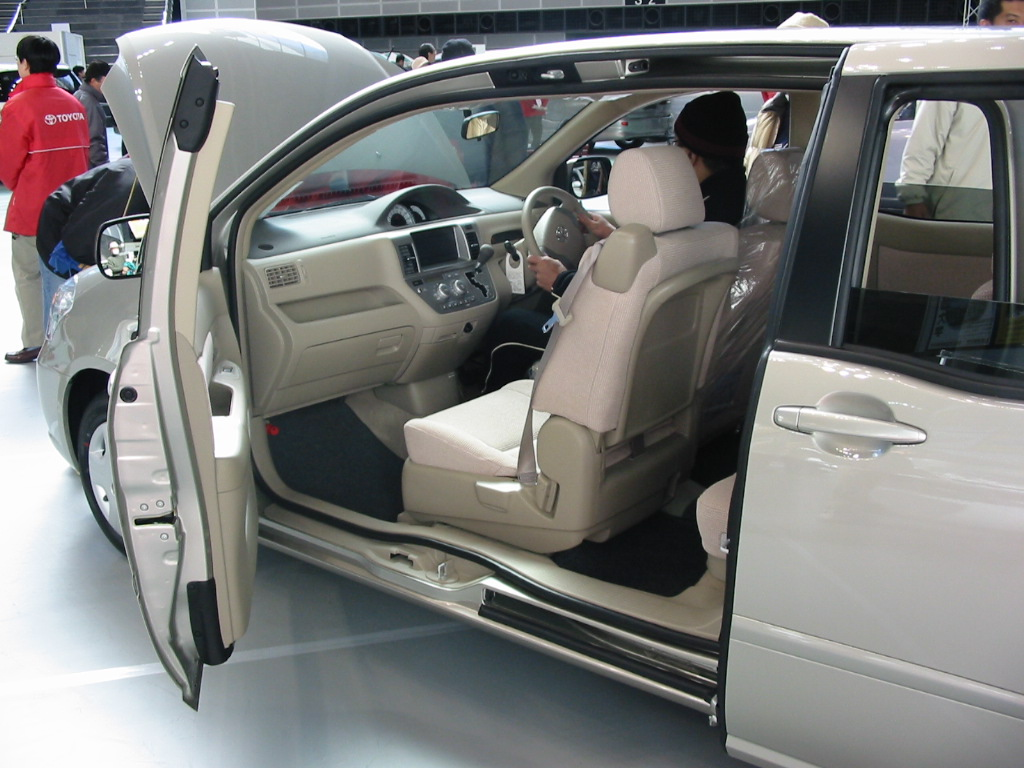
Toyota Raum with doors open

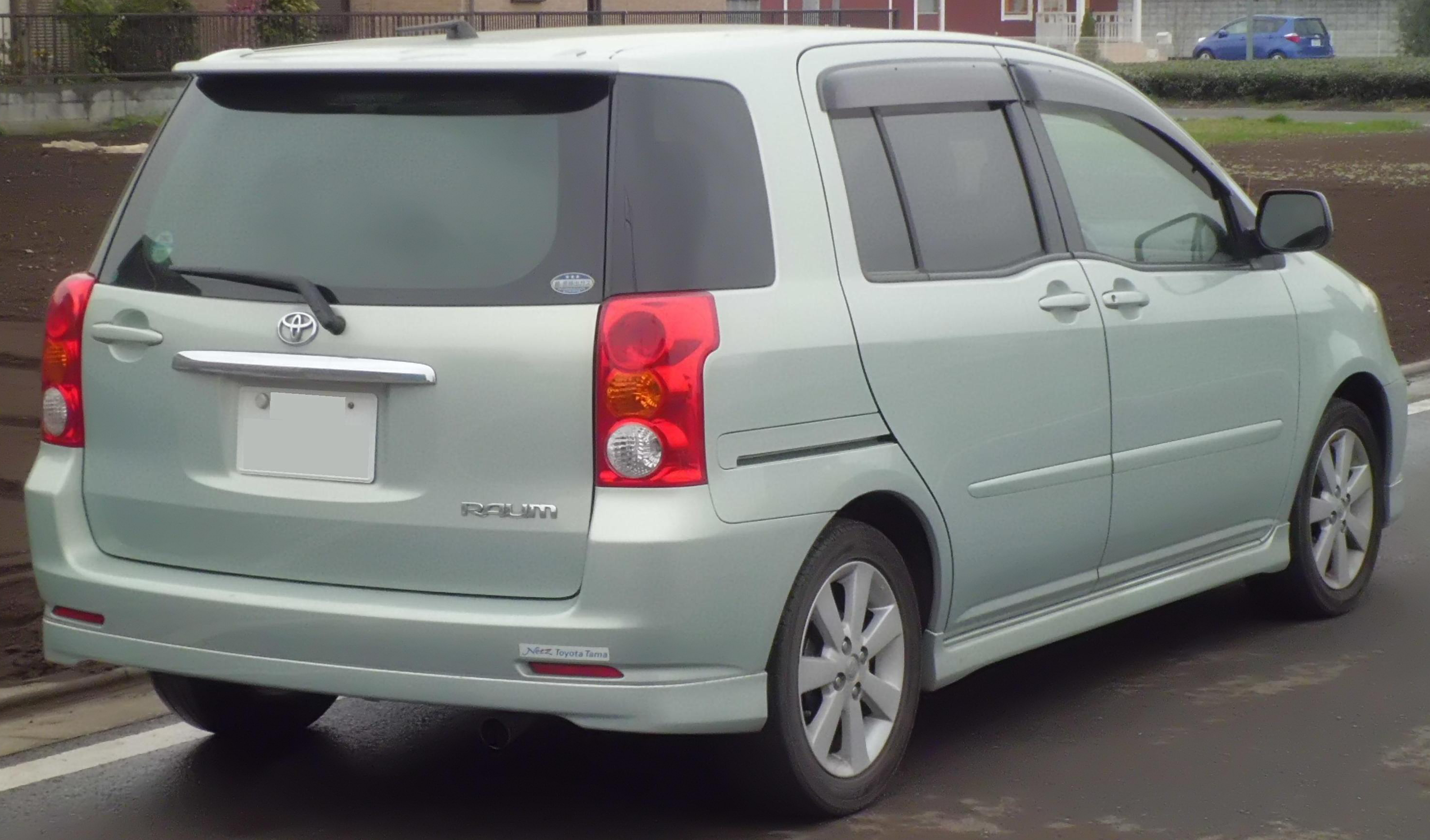
Pre-facelift Toyota Raum

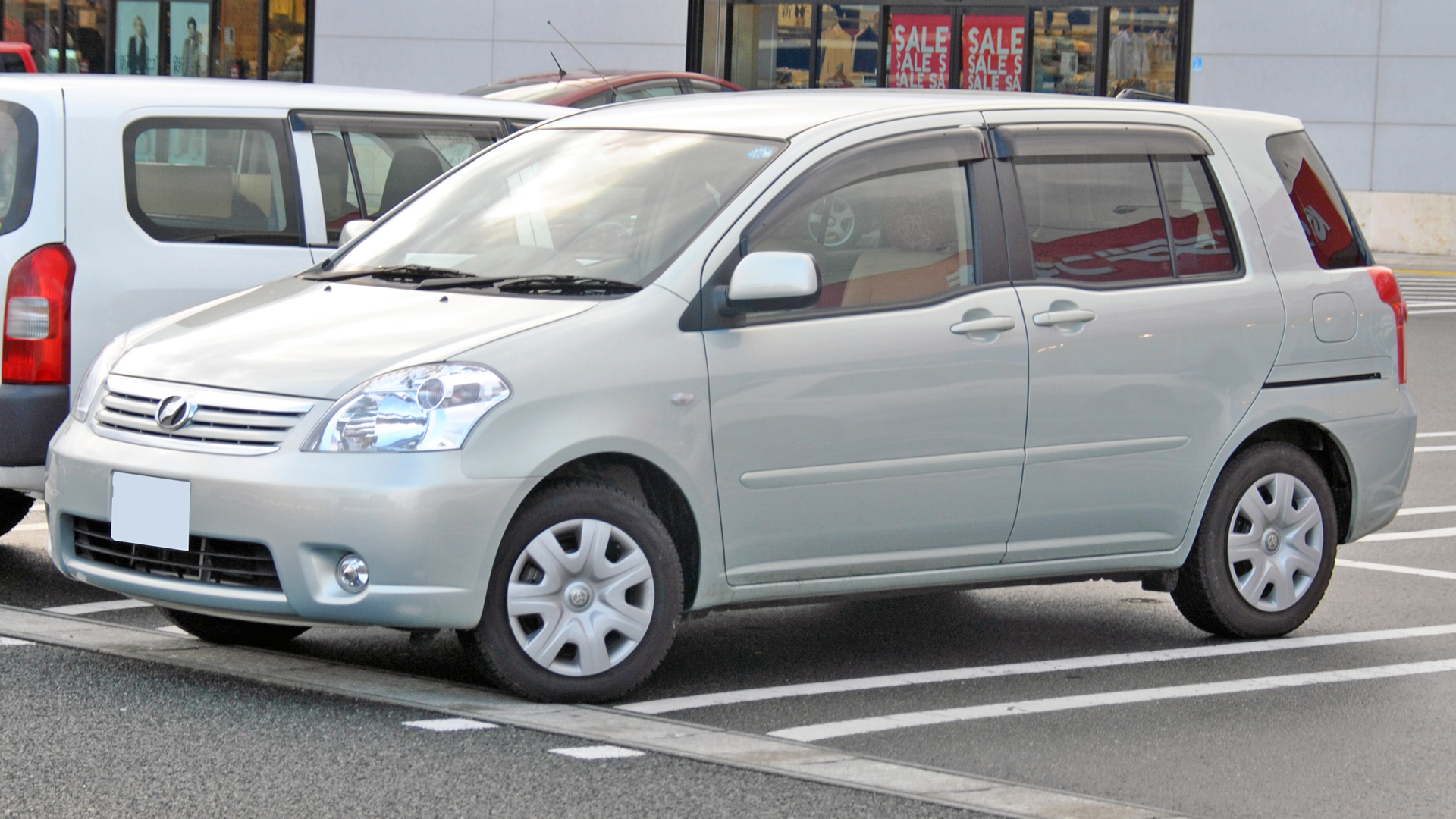
Facelift Toyota Raum

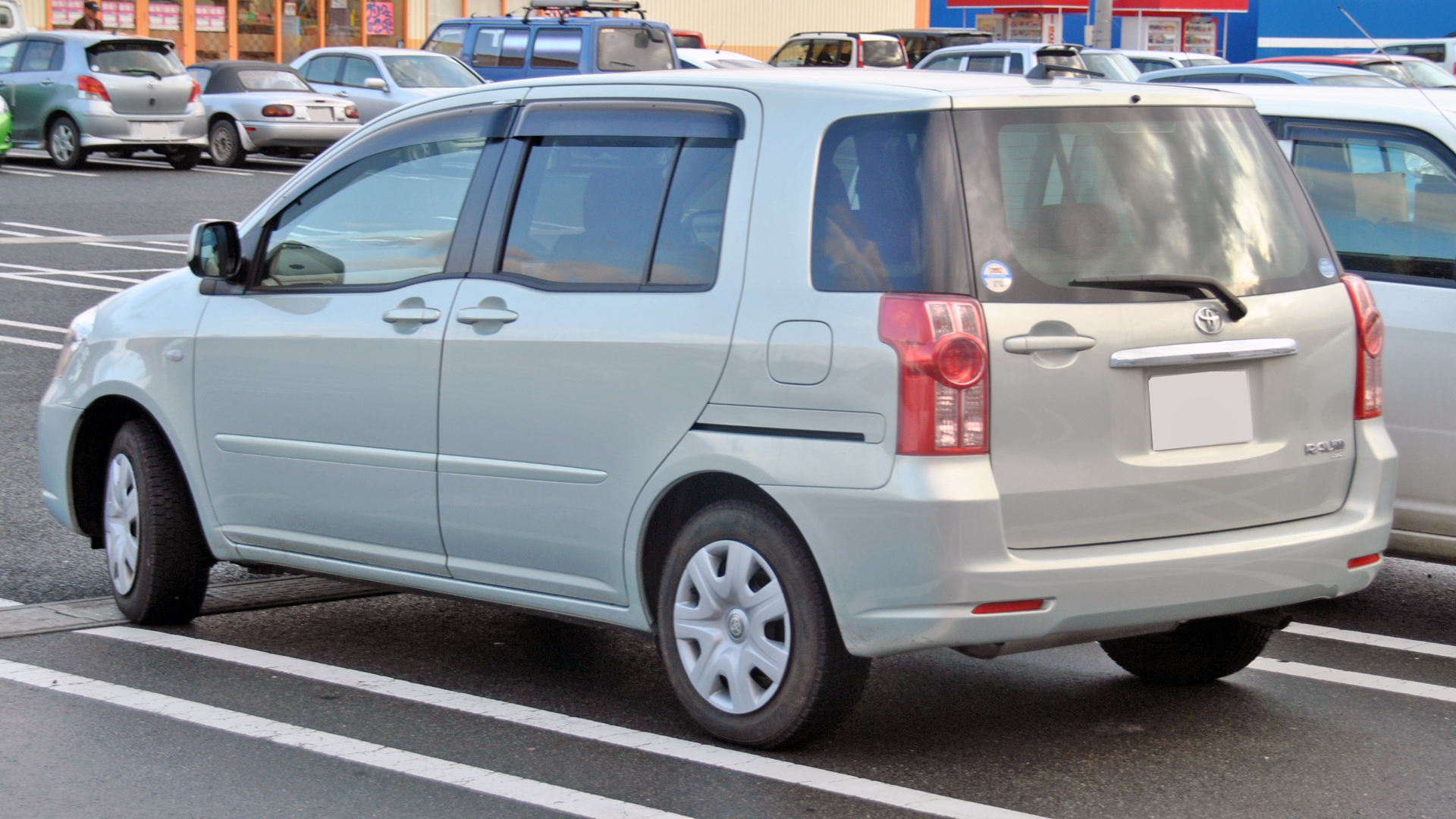
Facelift Toyota Raum
