= Southwest Finnish dialects =

Group of dialects of Finnish

- Lounaismurteet
- Language family: Uralic: Finno-Ugric; Finnic; Northern Finnic; Finnish; Southwest Finnish dialects

Language codes
- ISO 639-3: –
- Glottolog: sout2677
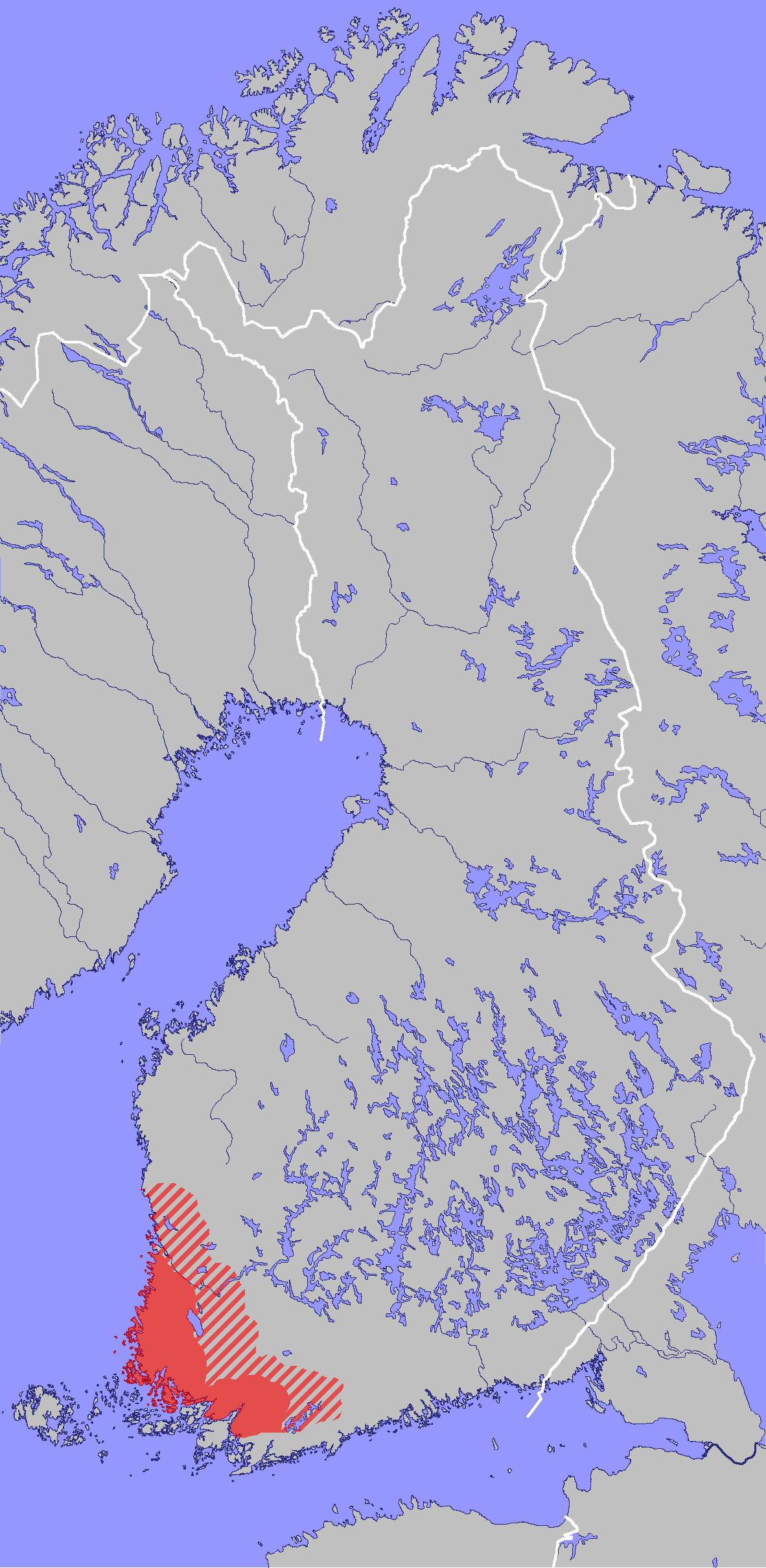
- The areas in which the Southwest Finnish dialects are traditionally spoken.

Southwest Finnish dialects (Finnish: Lounaismurteet) are Western Finnish dialects spoken in Southwest Finland and Satakunta.

The Southwest Finnish dialects have pitch accents and Swedish influences, as well as features from other dialect groups (especially Tavastian). However, features and influences from other Finnish dialect groups are largely absent in the Rauma dialect.

The Southwest Finnish dialects can be divided into two subgroups, Northern and Eastern groups, which in turn can be divided into even smaller groups. Heikki Ojansuu divided the Northern group into three: Rauma, Taivassalo and Masku groups, and the Eastern group into two: Halikko and Coastal groups.

== Features ==
=== Pronunciation of D ===
Standard Finnish /d/ is usually pronounced as /r/.

The dialects of Rauma and its surroundings also had /ð/ in its place, nowadays this pronunciation has almost completely been displaced by the r-pronunciation. This sound was generally written as a D, which can be seen in place names such as Ihode (originally pronounced as Ihoðe).

=== Pronunciation of ts ===
The standard Finnish consonant cluster ts usually corresponds to tt, e.g. mettä (forest), instead of standard metsä. In Finland Proper, this is usually subject to consonant gradation (plural: metät), while in Satakunta it is not (plural: mettät).

Southern Satakunta and some surroundings also had a /θ/ sound in its place, but like the voiced dental fricative, this sound has almost entirely disappeared. It was affected by consonant gradation in the Rauma area (plural: meθät), while in Kokemäki, Huittinen and Kauvatsa it was not (plural: meθθät).

=== Diphthongs uo, yö and ie/ea ===
The standard diphthongs uo, yö and ie/ea are generally pronounced as ua, yä and iä, e.g. nuari tyämiäs (young workman) instead of nuori työmies.

This feature is absent from some of the southernmost dialects of the group, however, they appear in most Tavastian and Southern Ostrobothnian dialects.

=== Geminated consonants ===
leippä, Standard Finnish: leipää 'bread' (partitive case)

linttu, Standard Finnish: lintua 'bird' (partitive case)

=== Inessive ending ===
maas, Standard Finnish 'maassa'

=== Imperfect ending ===
istusi, Standard Finnish: istuin 'I sat'

=== Shorter words ===
palk, Standard Finnish: palkka 'wage'.

=== Half-long vowels ===
asùn Turùs I live in Turku

=== Plural genitive ===
The plural genitive in Southwestern dialects is "-tten", which is similar to Estonian.

== Examples ==
Recording of the Southwest dialect in Hinnerjoki (1882)

Te muistatte viälä noita sepän töitä joita te ole, te olette hiukan seurannut sivusta.

nii, niitt ol tommoϑϑi, siihe mailma aikka viime vuassaδà lopùl, ko mnääki, muistama, rupèsi ni, niitt ol semmoϑϑì vanhoi, maasepìks sanòttiŋ Go, niit ol sit sillal.

muistaŋ Gon tual, Ilòmä èsäki, se o semmost tasàst, tasàst mäkki siik kohta, vaik se vähä̀ korkkia o siin on̬ semmone aika isò, pajà, pajàrakènus vaan tehty vaa sillal hirsist, neljä nurkkaha.

Example of the Turku dialect

Aletaaks tehrä loppuu lamas matelemisel!

Ei täst muute etiäppäin mennä kuin yrittämisel ja ilosel meininkil! Hyvä tapa henkennostatukseen on see, että suasita oman alueen kauppiai ja tuattajii, kekkä tarjoo ireoi ja tuattei juuri Sul!

Example of the Rauma dialect

Nortamo jaaritukse ovas suamlaise murrekirjallisude alk ja toistaseks sem baras saavutus. Sanota, ett hän sai kaunist soima semse instrumentin, go ei ollu viäl viritettykkä. Nortamo menestyksen grunttin ei kumminga ollu ainvastas murre, sill ett hän ol kans eriomane humorist.

== See also ==
- Turku
- Tavastian dialects
- South Ostrobothnian dialect
