= Tavastians =

Tribe of the Finnish people

- Coat of arms of the historical province of Tavastia

Regions with significant populations
- Pirkanmaa, Kanta-Häme, Päijät-Häme, Central Finland and Kymenlaakso

Languages
- Finnish (Tavastian dialects)

Religion
- Lutheranism

Related ethnic groups
- Other regional subgroups

The Tavastians or Häme Finns (Finnish: hämäläiset; Swedish: Tavaster) were an ancient Finnish tribe that inhabited the historical province of Tavastia (Finnish: Häme). In Russian sources, they are called yem (емь) or yam (ямь), but the term later disappeared from the Russian language after Finland was incorporated into the Swedish realm. The Tavastians are often noted for their conflicts with Novgorod.

== History ==
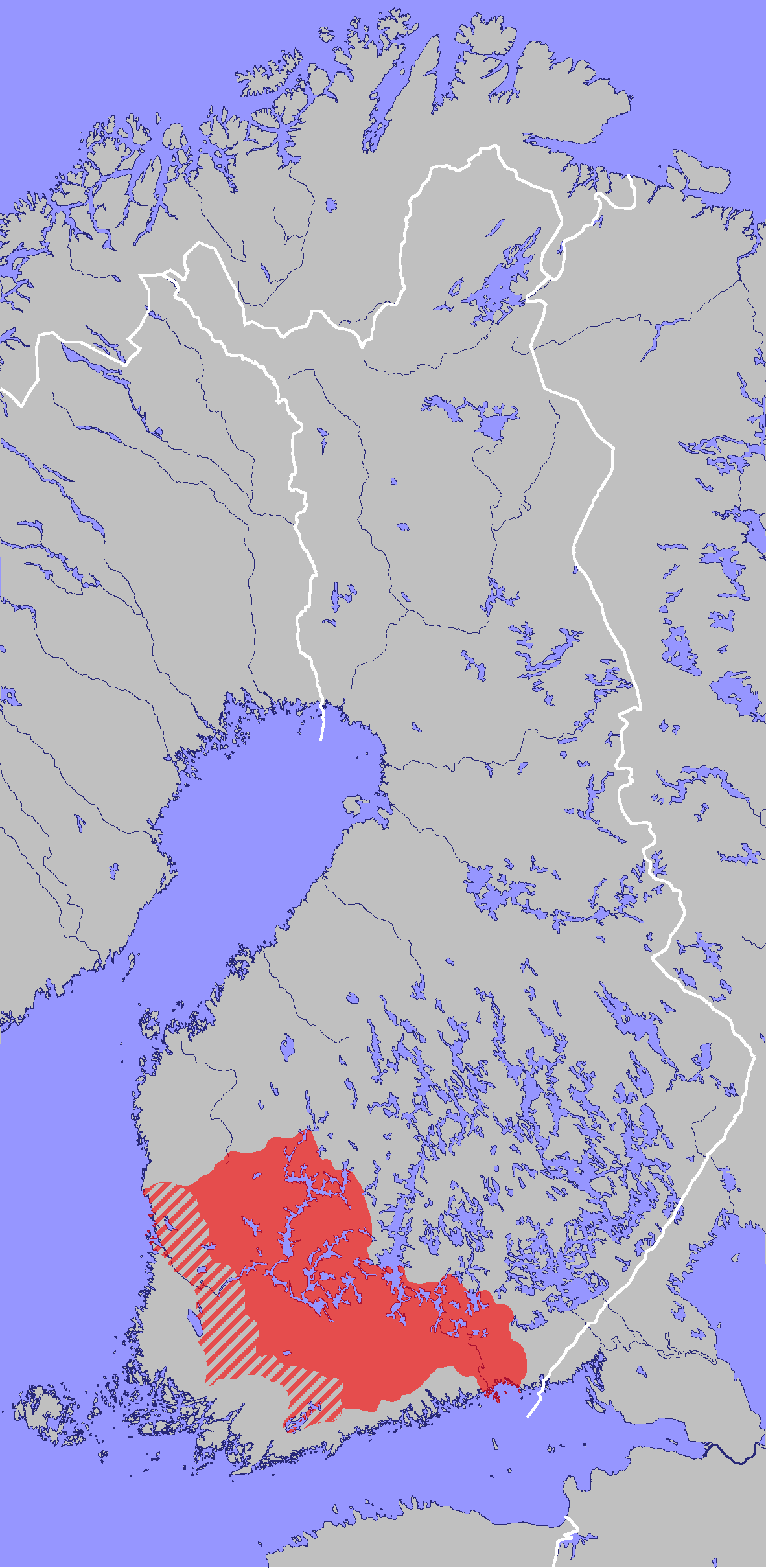
The areas where the Tavastian dialects are spoken.

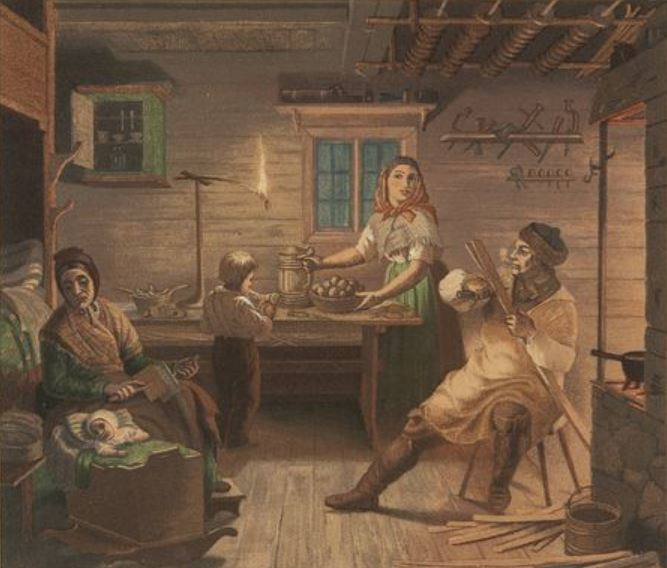
Tavastians; painted by R. W. Ekman in 1878

Tavastia (Finnish: Häme) has been inhabited since the early Stone Age. The core area of ancient Tavastia was formed around Lake Vanajavesi. Example of organized cooperation of iron age Tavastians are the hillforts that form a clear line in south-north direction around Hämeenlinna. Most remarkable from these hillforts is the Rapola Castle which is the biggest hillfort found in Finland, but also Tenhola hillfort in Hattula and Hakoinen Castle were important fortresses. Villages were often developed around the fortresses and for example Hattula and Vanaja-Janakkala had their beginning in this way.

Russian chronicles, including the Novgorod First Chronicle, describe the Tavastians as being in frequent conflict with Novgorod. They are first mentioned in 1042, when Vladimir of Novgorod attacked them. This is the first time that Finland is mentioned in Russian texts. The Novgorodians and Karelians proceeded to launch raids against the Tavastians, who in turn carried out counterattacks. The Tavastians are also recorded as having fought against the Votians. Yaroslav Vsevolodovich is recorded as having launched a raid in 1226 and having reached farther than any previous Russian prince. The 1256 raid by Alexander Nevsky is also mentioned. The Russian term yamskaya zemlya ('Tavastian land') is first mentioned in sources in 1292, which implies a distinct region and stresses otherness compared to Novgorodskaya zemlya ('Novgorodian land') or Russkaya zemlya ('Russian land'), but the term was short-lived as by 1311, the area was referred to as nemetskaya zemlya ('German land') and its inhabitants as nemtsy ('Germans'). (Note: The Russian term nemtsy ('Germans') included the Teutonic Knights, the Swedes, and the Baltic region. The term first applied to foreign merchants and then those who were allied with the chud.) The concept of the Tavastians disappears from Russian sources following the signing of the Treaty of Nöteborg in 1323.

Possibly the oldest known road of Finland, Hämeen härkätie ('Oxen Road of Tavastia') connected Tavastia with the western coast of Finland. The first signs of Christianity can be dated to the 11th century.

== Sources ==
- "Емь" . Brockhaus and Efron Encyclopedic Dictionary (in Russian). 1906.
- Korpela, Jukka (2002). "Finland's Eastern Border after the Treaty of Nöteborg: An Ecclesiastical, Political or Cultural Border?". Journal of Baltic Studies. 33 (4): 384–397. ISSN 0162-9778.
- Korpela, Jukka (2008). "North-western «others» in medieval Russian chronicles" (PDF). Ученые записки Петрозаводского государственного университета. 2 (93): 42–55. ISSN 1998-5053.
- Nazarova, Evgeniya L. (5 July 2017). "The Crusades against Votians and Izhorians in the Thirteenth Century". In Murray, Alan V. (ed.). Crusade and Conversion on the Baltic Frontier 1150–1500. Routledge. pp. 177–196. doi:10.4324/9781315258805-9. ISBN 978-1-315-25880-5.
