= Häme dialects =

Group of dialects of Finnish

- Hämäläismurteet
- Native to: Finland
- Language family: Uralic: Finnic; Finnish; Häme dialects

Language codes
- ISO 639-3: –
- Glottolog: hame1240
- Areas where the Häme dialects are spoken.: 1. Central Häme dialects 2. Southern Häme dialects 3. Southeastern Häme dialects; 3A. Hollola group; 3B. Porvoo group; 3C. Iitti group 4. Upper Satakunta dialects; Southwestern dialects are marked with red diagonal stripes.

Häme dialects (Finnish: Hämäläismurteet), or Tavastian dialects, are Western Finnish dialects spoken in Pirkanmaa, Päijät-Häme, Kanta-Häme, and in parts of Satakunta, Uusimaa and Kymenlaakso. The dialect spoken in the city of Tampere is part of the Häme dialects. The Häme dialects have influenced other Finnish dialects (especially the Southwest Finnish dialects).

== Dialectal features ==
=== Pronunciation of d ===
Where Standard Finnish has /d/, the Häme dialects have either /r/ or /l/ in its place. The r-pronunciation is the more common one. The l-pronunciation is encountered on two separate areas: in the eastern boundary of the dialect area as well as in a smaller area which includes Akaa and Tammela to name a few.

Therefore, lehdet (leaves) can be pronounced as lehret or lehlet. However, the plural of vesi (water, standard plural vedet) can be pronounced as veset in the r-dialects, in order to not cause confusion with veret (bloods, plural of veri).

=== Pronunciation of ts ===
Instead of the standard consonant cluster ts, tt (long /t/) is used, e.g. metsä (forest) is mettä. It is not affected by consonant gradation, so the genitive form is mettän.

At least historically, the dialects of Tuusula, Pornainen and nearby areas used a ss instead, e.g. messä, genitive: messän. This has mainly been supplanted by the more common tt-pronunciation.

=== Diphthongs uo, yö and ie ===
The Standard Finnish diphthongs /uo/, /yø/ and /ie/ correspond respectively to /uɑ/, /yæ/ and /iæ/. For example, nuori (young) is pronounced nuari.

=== Long a and ä ===
As is the case for other western Finnish dialects, the Häme dialects mostly use the standard-like aa and ää. The dialects near Ikaalinen are an exception, as aa and ää have developed into oo (long [ɔ]) and ee (long [ɛ]) respectively, e.g. moo instead of maa and pee instead of pää. Nowadays this feature is rarer.

A diphthongization of ää into iä or ie has been attested from the dialects near Hollola, e.g. pää may be piä or pie and leipää ("bread", partitive) may be leipiä or leipie. This feature is rare nowadays.

=== -ea and -eä ===
-ea and -eä are most notably used as a suffix for adjectives. In the Häme dialects, the most common variant of this is -ee, e.g. korkee instead of korkea (high). The variant used for shorter words, such as pimeä (dark), may be either pimee or pimmee, depending on whether the dialect has gemination or not.

The standard -ea-type is found in northern Päijät-Häme, such as in Nastola, Hollola and Heinola.

A rare -ie-type (korkie, pimie) has been attested from Lammi, Hämeenkoski and Padasjoki.

=== /h/ after unstressed syllables ===
The h-sound after unstressed syllables has been preserved in the dialects of Kymenlaakso. For example, lampaat (sheep, plural) may be lampahat as in many Southern Ostrobothnian dialects and tupaan (illative of tupa) may be tupah similarly to its equivalent in the Karelian language. Other Häme dialects have not preserved this sound.

=== Illative case ===
==== Third infinitive ====
A suffix -Vn (where V corresponds to the preceding vowel) is used instead of the standard -maan/-mään, e.g. ottaan, tekeen instead of ottamaan, tekemään.

=== Other features ===
In the Häme dialects, /ŋk/, doesn't change with consonant gradiation: henki - henken (standard Finnish: henki - hengen).

In the southeastern Häme dialects, words often have a final -i, that is not found in standard Finnish, For example: min nimei 'my name' (standard Finnish: minun nimi).

== See also ==
- Tavastians
