= Hankavesi-Välivesi =

Lake in Ähtäri, Finland

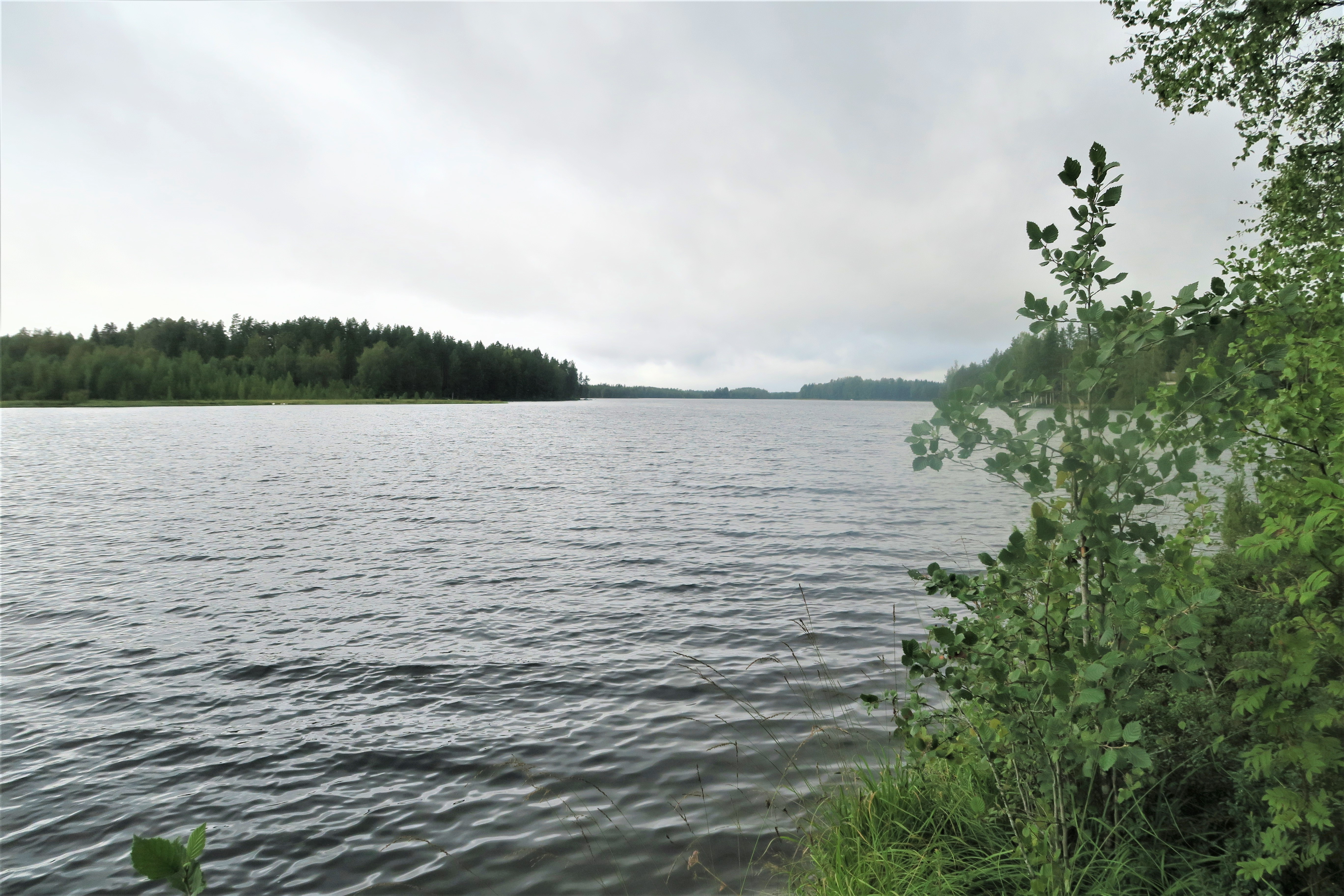
- Hankavesi lake basin in 2021

- Location within Finland
- Location: Ähtäri, South Ostrobothnia, Finland
- Coordinates: 62°31′52″N 24°09′43″E
- Surface area: 12.9 km^{2} (5.0 sq mi)
- Max. depth: 16 m (52 ft)
- Islands: 15

Hankavesi-Välivesi is a lake in South Ostrobothnia, Finland, located in the municipality of Ähtäri. It consists of four lake basins called Hankavesi, Välivesi, Moksunjärvi and Lamminperänlampi. Hankavesi-Välivesi has a surface area of about 13 square kilometres.

Hankavesi is the largest of the lake basins. Right next to the basin is located Ähtäri Zoo. In the middle of Hankavesi, there is a large island called Hankasaari with many buildings. In total, there are seven islands or islets in the basin, of which are named also Jänissaari (meaning "Hare Island") and Järvisensaari ("Järvinen's Island"). Hankavesi looks as if it has merged into Moksunjärvi basin because their strait called Moksunsalmi is so wide.

Välivesi basin is slightly smaller than Hankavesi. It stands out from Hankavesi and from lake Ähtärinjärvi by straits called Nääsinsalmi and Ähtärinsalmi. The maximum depth of the lake, 16 metres, has been measured from many points of Välivesi. Around the south coast of Välivesi, there are located parts of the village of Inha. Välivesi has six islands or islets, of which the largest are called Mustasaari ("Black Island"), Isot-Sammalet ("Big-Mosses") and Vähät-Sammalet ("Little-Mosses").

Moksunjärvi and Lamminperänlampi basins are both connected to Hankavesi by strait. Moksunjärvi has two small, unnamed islands. Lamminperänlampi is the smallest of the lake basins and it has no islands. Its northwest coast has a public swimming beach. Moksunjärvi is overtaken by the Haapamäki–Seinäjoki railway.

Hankavesi-Välivesi belongs to Kokemäenjoki basin. Into Moksunjärvi discharges Niemisjoki which is the outlet of lake Niemisvesi-Pemu. The outlet of Hankavesi-Välivesi is Inhanjoki from Hankavesi basin to lake Ouluvesi.
