= Ähtärinjärvi =

Lake in South Ostrobothnia region, Finland

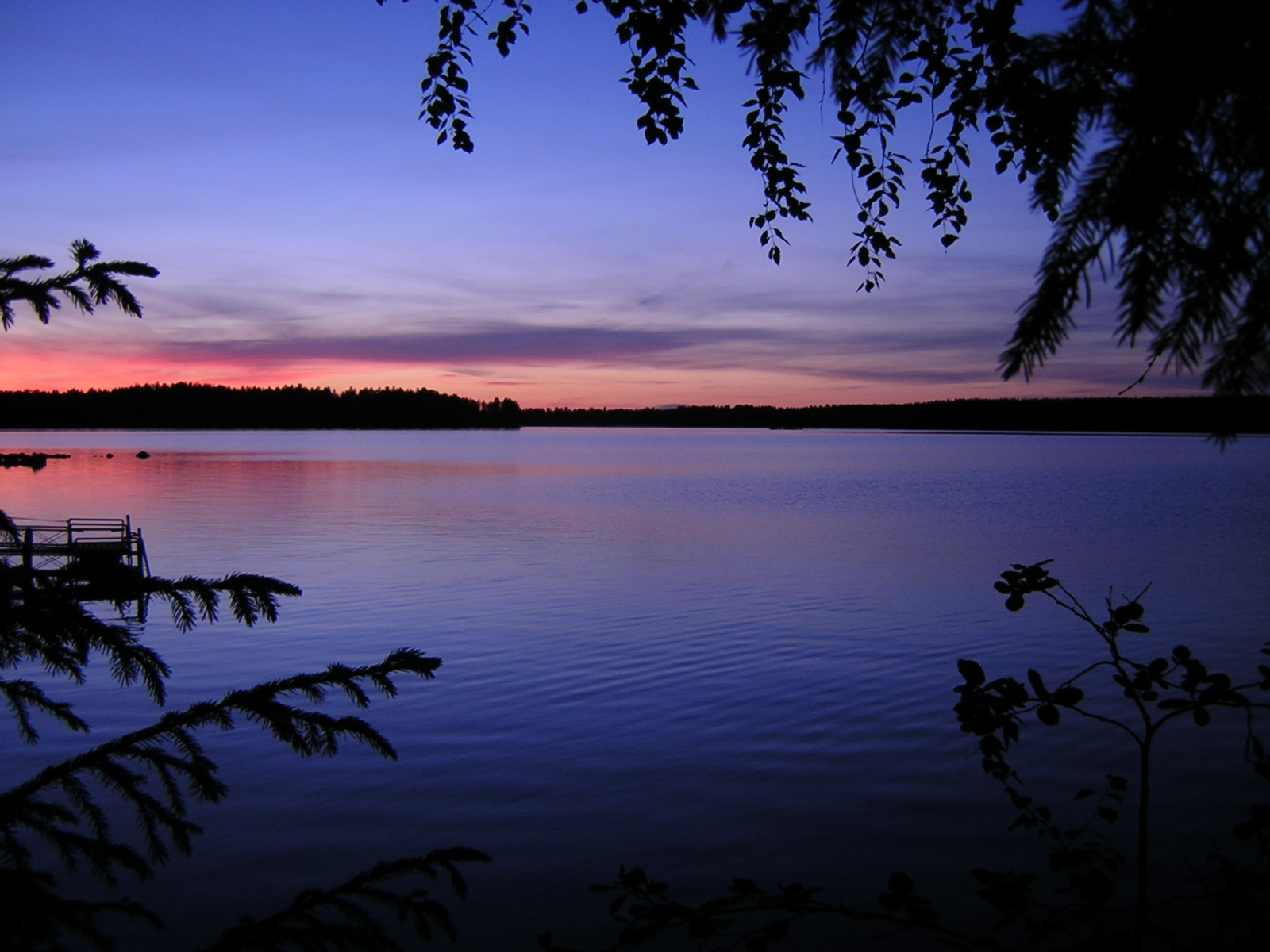
- Lake Ähtärinjärvi at summer night

- Location within Finland
- Location: Ähtäri, Alajärvi, Soini
- Coordinates: 62°40′N 24°03′E
- Catchment area: 479.98 km^{2} (185.32 sq mi)
- Basin countries: Finland
- Max. length: 29 km (18 mi)
- Max. width: 3 km (1.9 mi)
- Surface area: 45.1 km^{2} (17.4 sq mi)
- Average depth: 6.1 m (20 ft)
- Max. depth: 28 m (92 ft)
- Surface elevation: 153.5 m (504 ft)

Ähtärinjärvi is a lake in Finland. It is situated in the municipalities of Ähtäri, Alajärvi (formerly Lehtimäki) and Soini in the South Ostrobothnia region in western Finland. The lake is part of the Kokemäenjoki basin and drains through a chain of lakes that includes among others the lakes Toisvesi and Tarjanne in the Pirkanmaa region, where the lake Tarjanne in its turn drains into the Lake Ruovesi.

== See also ==
- List of lakes in Finland
