= Evijärvi =

- Municipality
- Evijärven kunta Evijärvi kommun
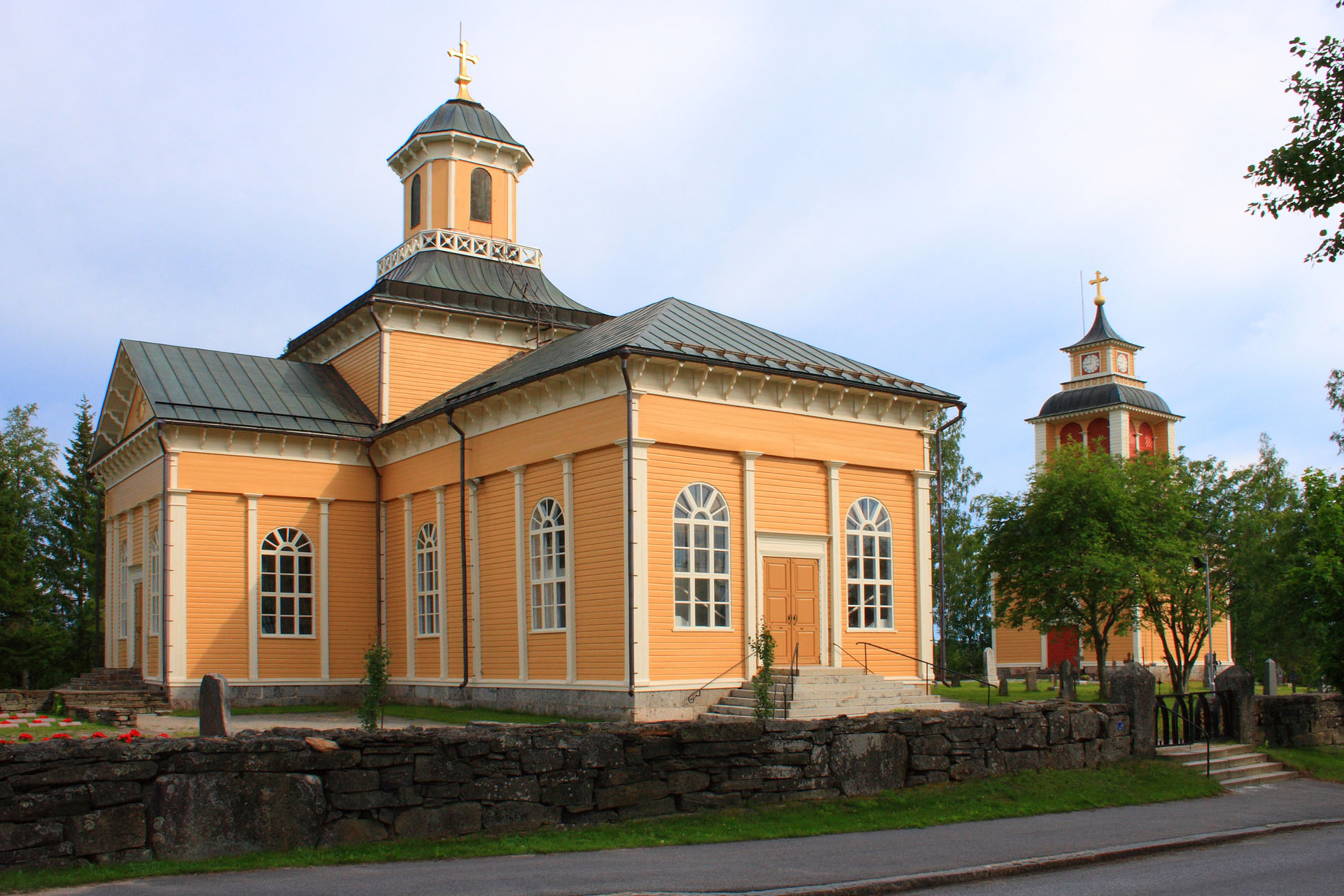
- Evijärvi Church

- Coat of arms

- Location of Evijärvi in Finland
- Interactive map of Evijärvi
- Coordinates: 63°22′N 023°28.5′E
- Country: Finland
- Region: South Ostrobothnia
- Sub-region: Järviseutu
- Charter: 1867

Government
  - Municipal manager: Mikko Huhtala

Area (2018-01-01)
  - Total: 390.71 km^{2} (150.85 sq mi)
  - Land: 354.15 km^{2} (136.74 sq mi)
  - Water: 36.7 km^{2} (14.2 sq mi)
  - Rank: 216th largest in Finland

Population (2025-12-31)
  - Total: 2,267
  - Rank: 245th largest in Finland
  - Density: 6.4/km^{2} (17/sq mi)

Population by native language
  - Finnish: 92.7% (official)
  - Swedish: 2.1%
  - Others: 5.2%

Population by age
  - 0 to 14: 16.3%
  - 15 to 64: 54.2%
  - 65 or older: 29.6%
- Time zone: UTC+02:00 (EET)
  - Summer (DST): UTC+03:00 (EEST)
- Website: evijarvi.fi

Evijärvi (Finnish pronunciation: [ˈeʋiˌjærʋi]) is a municipality of Finland. It is located in the South Ostrobothnia region. The municipality has a population of 2,267 (31 December 2025) and covers an area of 390.71 square kilometres (150.85 sq mi) of which 36.7 km^{2} (14.2 sq mi) is water. The population density is 6.4 inhabitants per square kilometre (17/sq mi).

Neighbouring municipalities are Kauhava, Kronoby, Lappajärvi, Pedersöre and Veteli. The municipality is unilingually Finnish. There is a lake of the same name in the municipality.

The coat of arms of Evijärvi, designed by Olof Eriksson, resembles the coat of arms of Alajärvi in appearance; the only difference being the two red-finned fish that appear on Evijärvi's coat of arms. In the 1980s, salted fish made from bream caught in the spring was named the traditional local dish of Evijärvi.

== Notable people born in Evijärvi ==
- Esko Ahonen (1955–2025), politician
- Tea Ista (1932–2014), actress
- Aleksi Kiviaho (1913–1986), politician
- Ilmari Linna (1917–1981), business executive and politician
- Jalmari Linna (1891–1954), politician
