= Kuusiokunnat =

Kuusiokunnat Kuusiokuntien seutukunta
- Sub-region
- Country: Finland
- Region: South Ostrobothnia

Population (2011)
  - Total: 22,815
- Time zone: UTC+2 (EET)
  - Summer (DST): UTC+3 (EEST)

Kuusiokunnat is a subdivision of South Ostrobothnia and one of the sub-regions of Finland since 2009.

The name means "six municipalities", which refers to how many municipalities there were in the sub-region when it was established. Nowadays, it only contains three municipalities.

== Municipalities ==
Coat of arms	Municipality
Alavuden vaakuna	Alavus (town)
Kuortaneen vaakuna	Kuortane (municipality)
Ähtärin vaakuna	Ähtäri (town)

=== Former ===
- Lehtimäki (now part of Alajärvi, in the Järviseutu sub-region)
- Soini (switched to Järviseutu sub-region)
- Töysä (joined Alavus in 2013)
