= Vimpeli =

Vimpeli Vindala
- Municipality
- Vimpelin kunta Vindala kommun
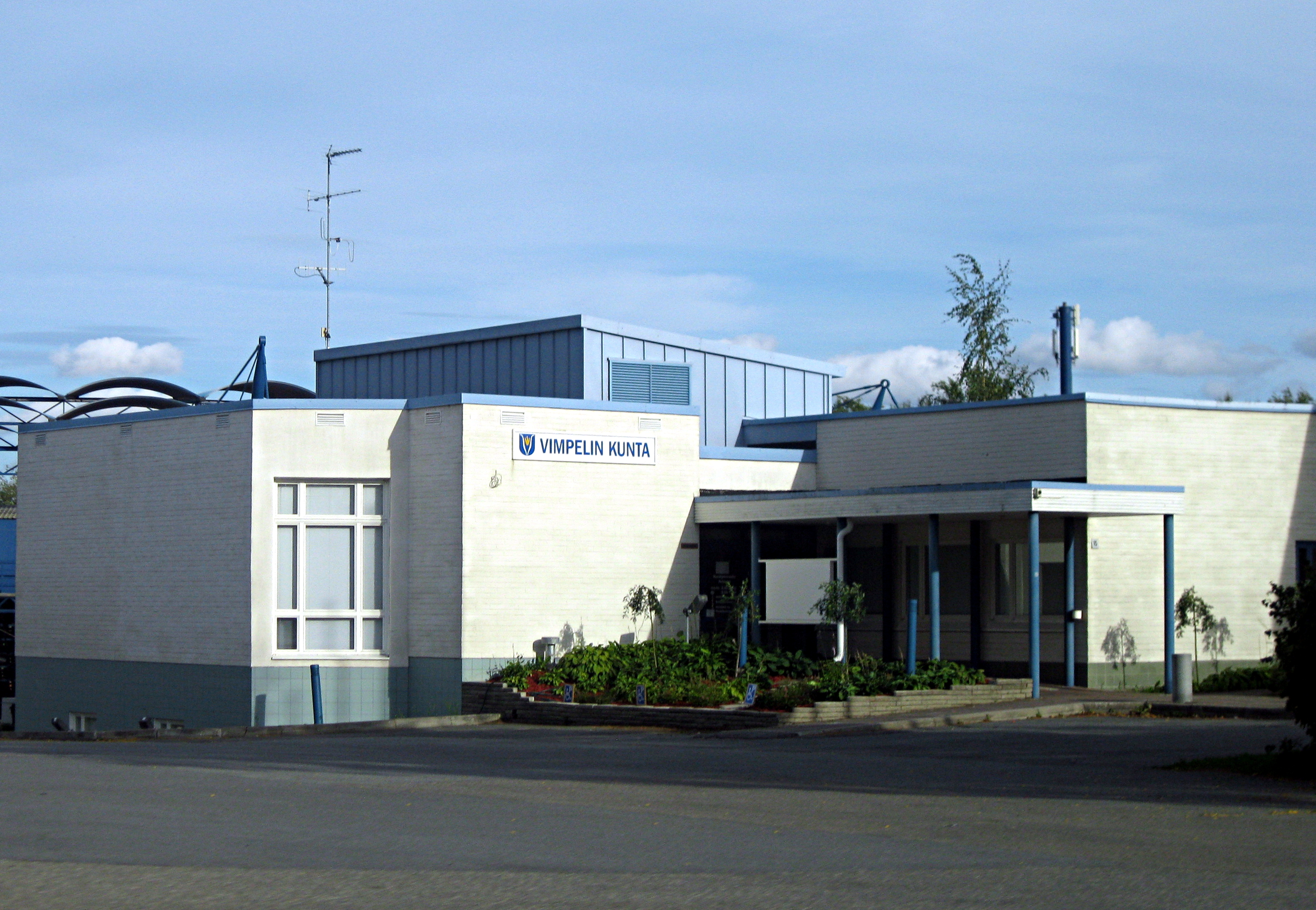
- Municipal office

- Coat of arms

- Location of Vimpeli in Finland
- Interactive map of Vimpeli
- Coordinates: 63°09.7′N 023°49′E
- Country: Finland
- Region: South Ostrobothnia
- Sub-region: Järviseutu
- Charter: 1866

Government
  - Municipal manager: Sam Leijonanmieli

Area (2018-01-01)
  - Total: 328.79 km^{2} (126.95 sq mi)
  - Land: 287.32 km^{2} (110.93 sq mi)
  - Water: 41.52 km^{2} (16.03 sq mi)
  - Rank: 238th largest in Finland

Population (2025-12-31)
  - Total: 2,554
  - Rank: 229th largest in Finland
  - Density: 8.89/km^{2} (23.0/sq mi)

Population by native language
  - Finnish: 97.2% (official)
  - Others: 2.8%

Population by age
  - 0 to 14: 13.9%
  - 15 to 64: 55.7%
  - 65 or older: 30.4%
- Time zone: UTC+02:00 (EET)
  - Summer (DST): UTC+03:00 (EEST)
- Website: www.vimpeli.fi

Vimpeli (Finnish: [ˈʋimpeli]; Swedish: Vindala) is a municipality of Finland. It is located in the South Ostrobothnia region, 79 kilometres (49 mi) northeast of Seinäjoki and 166 kilometres (103 mi) northwest of Jyväskylä. The municipality has a population of 2,554 (31 December 2025) and covers an area of 328.79 square kilometres (126.95 sq mi) of which 41.52 km^{2} (16.03 sq mi) is water. The population density is 8.89 inhabitants per square kilometre (23.0/sq mi). The most significant road connection in the municipality is the main road 68 between towns of Virrat and Jakobstad.

Vimpeli was crucial in the Winter War due to its ski-factory that created over half of the skis used in the war.

In sport, Vimpeli is known for the success of its Finnish baseball team, Vimpelin Veto, which won gold in the 2010, 2016 and 2017 seasons in the Finnish championships. The Island Field ballpark is the home field of Vimpelin Veto, and its well-known competitor is Sotkamon Jymy from Sotkamo, known as long-time arch-enemy of Vimpelin Veto.

The municipality is unilingually Finnish.

== Geography ==
Vimpeli's neighboring municipalities are Alajärvi, Lappajärvi, Perho and Veteli.

=== Villages ===
- Hallapuro
- Huopana
- Kirkonkylä
- Koskela
- Lakaniemi
- Pokela
- Pyhälahti
- Rantakylä
- Sääksjärvi
- Viitaniemi
- Vinni

== Notable people born in Vimpeli ==
- Matti Latvala (1868 – 1964)
- Santeri Mäkelä (1870 – 1938)
- Juho Haveri (1876 – 1961)
- Antti Rentola (1881 – 1919)
- Väinö Rankila (1911 – 1970)
- Terttu Savola (1941 – )
- Jukka Vihriälä (1945 – )

== Gallery ==
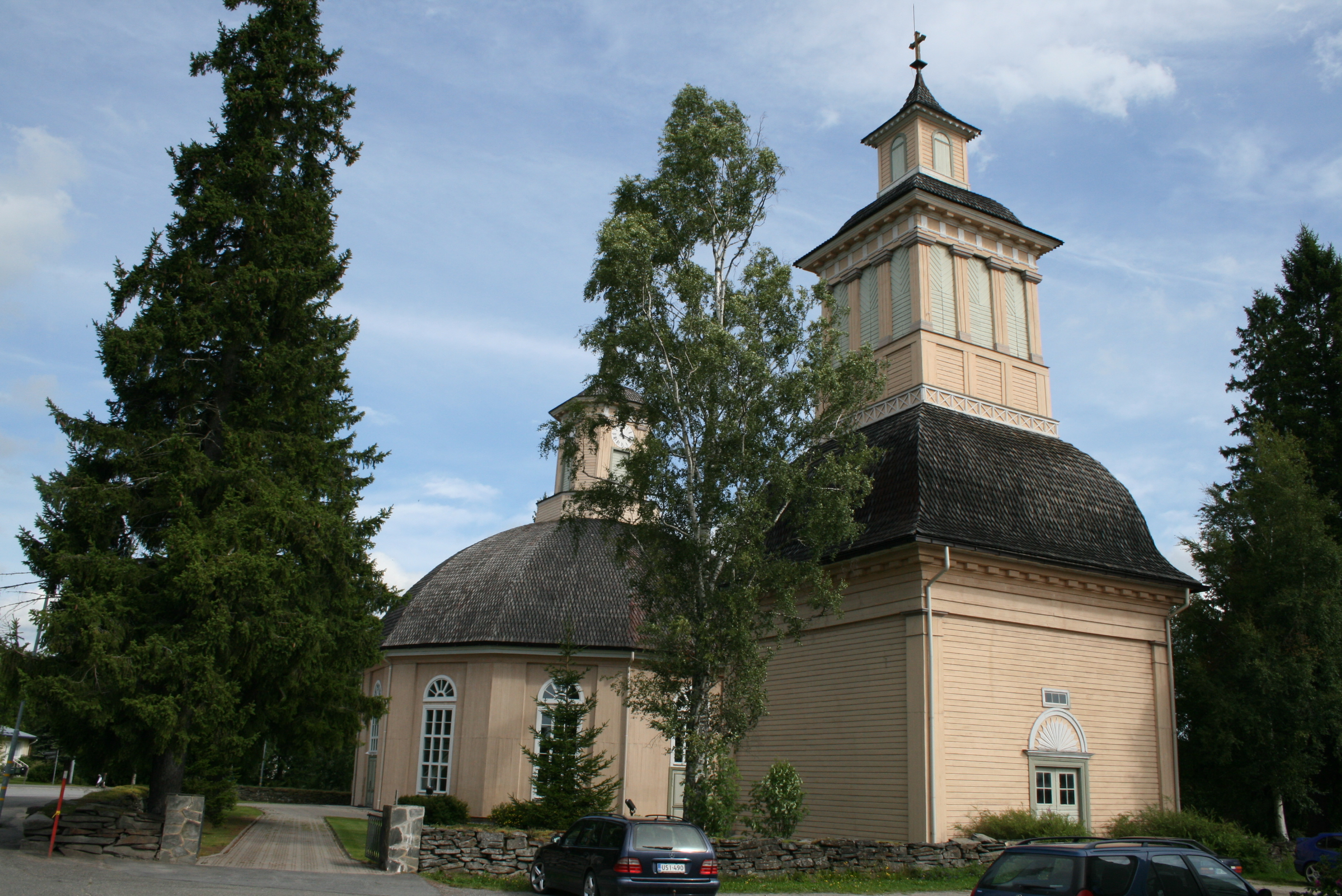
Vimpeli church

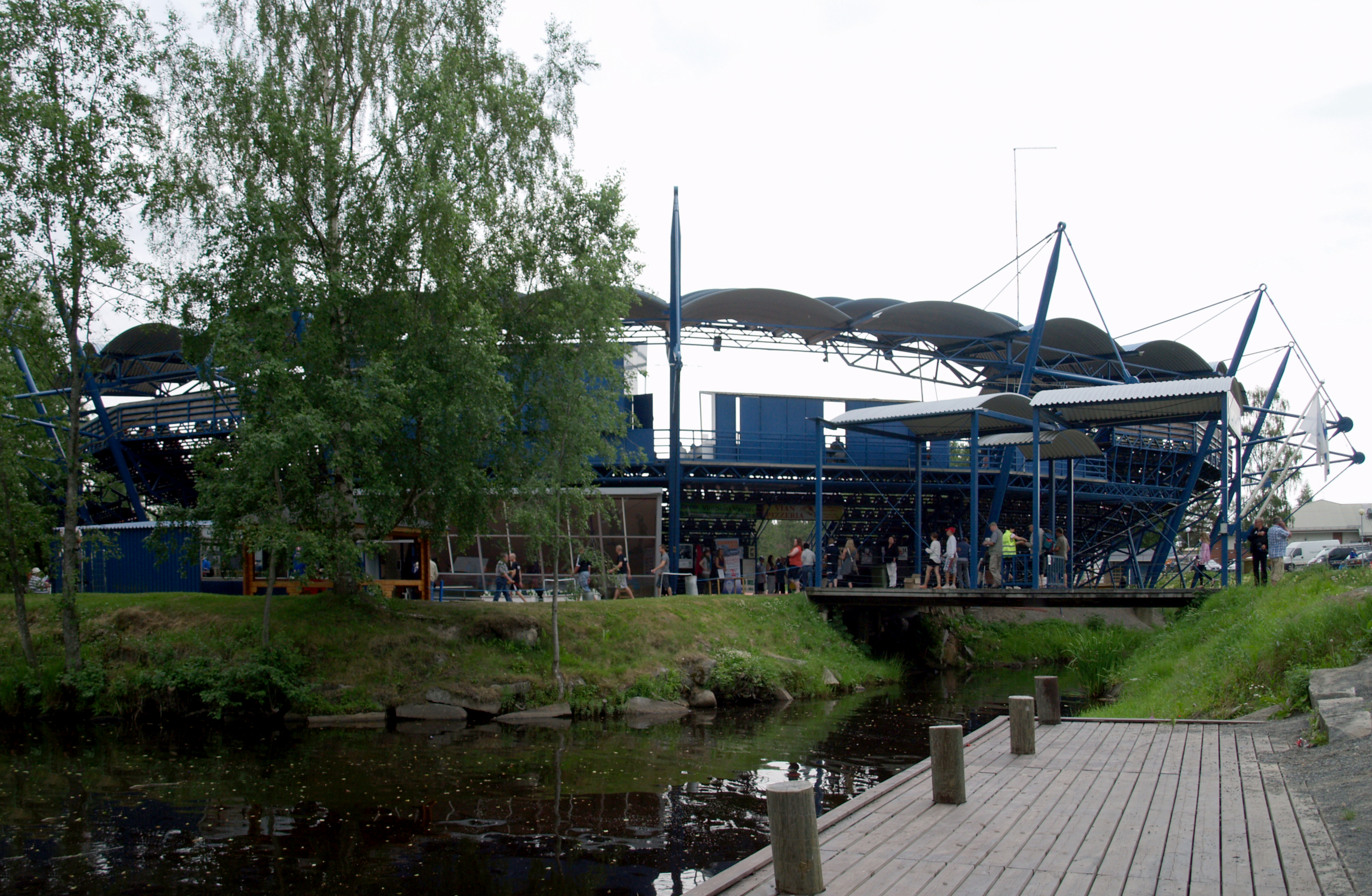
Saarikenttä pesäpallo stadium

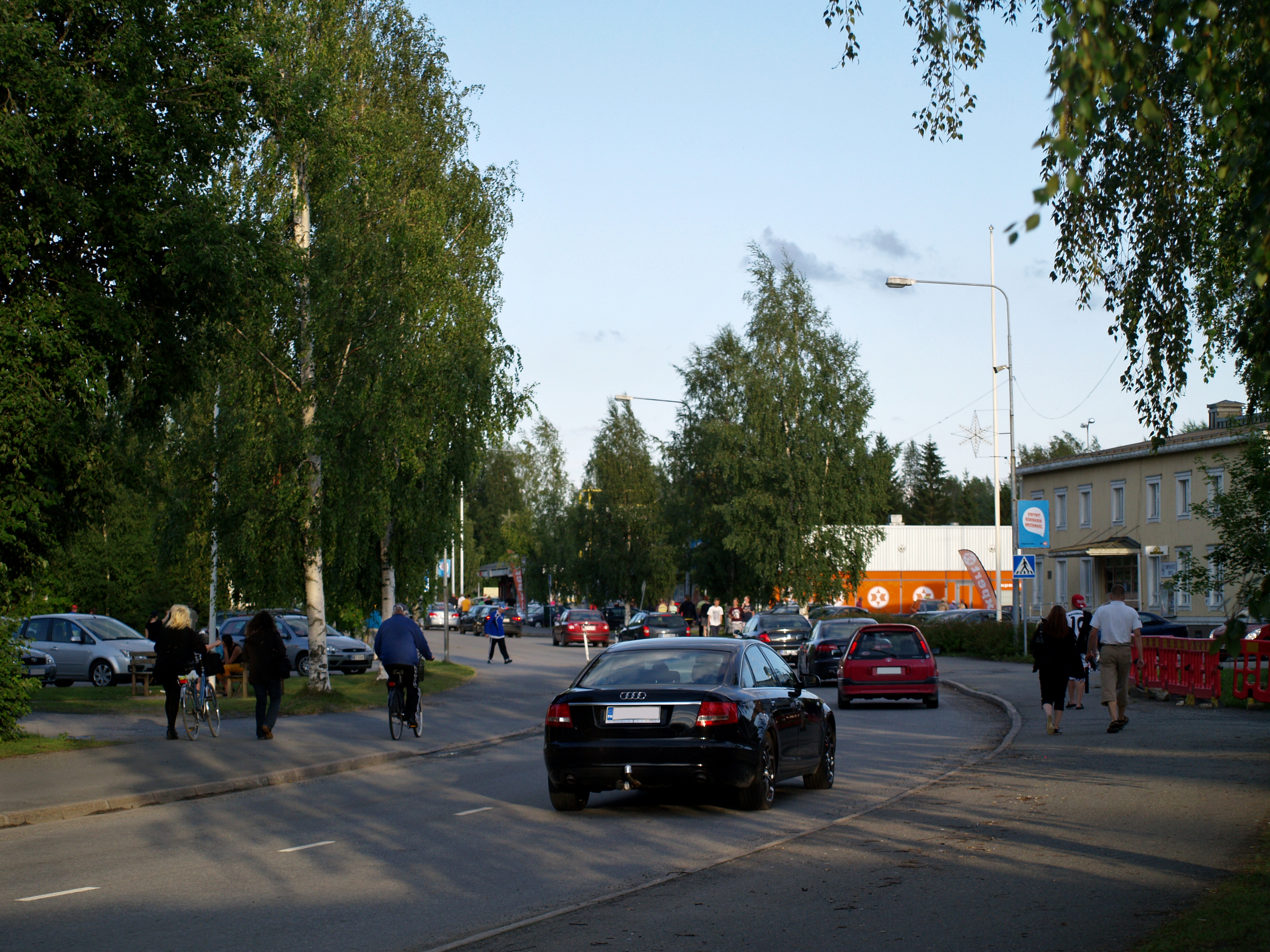
Vimpeli downtown

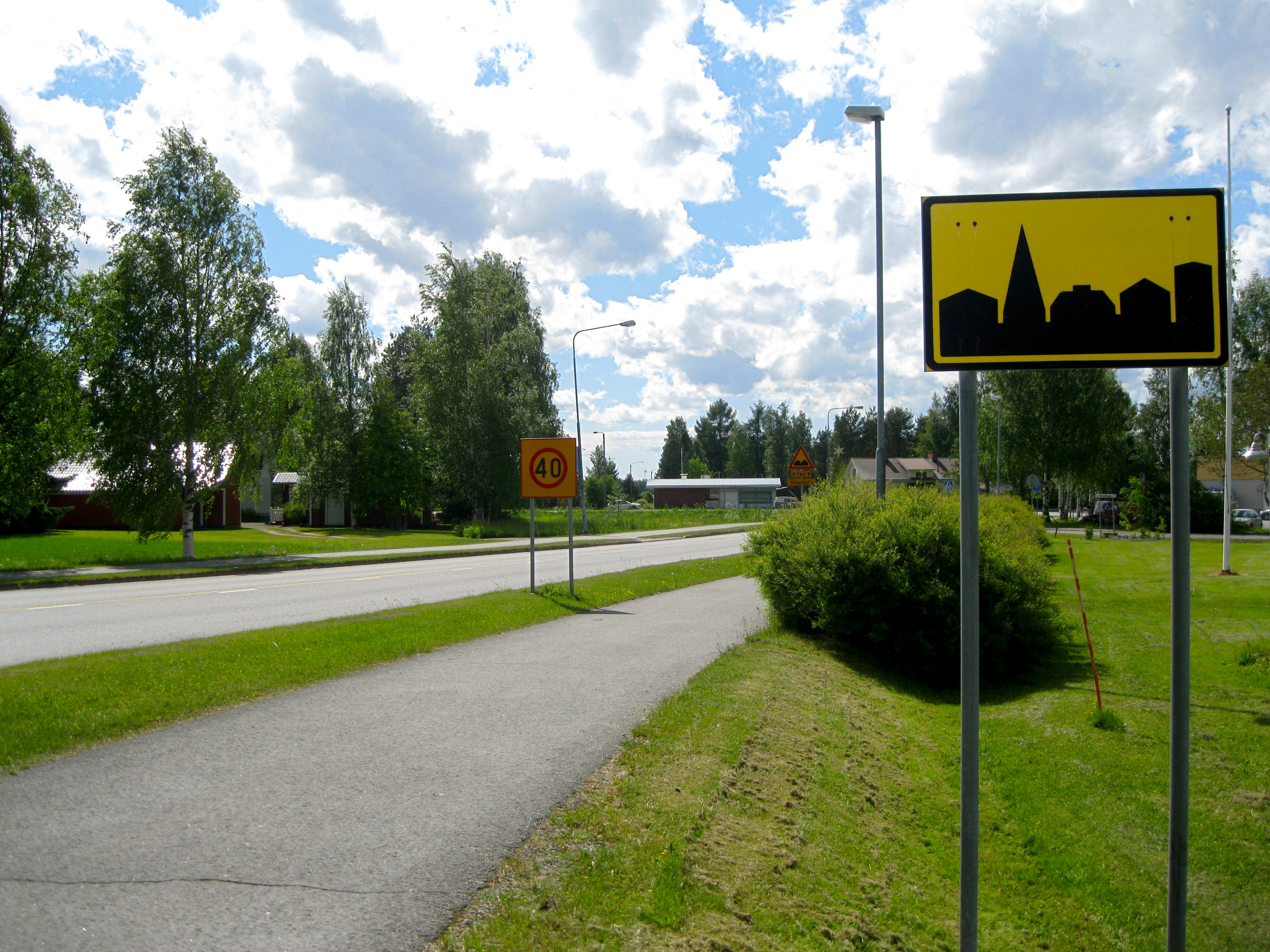
A street sign that indicates the beginning of an urban area in Vimpeli
