= Saarinen (Ähtäri) =

Lake in Ähtäri, Finland

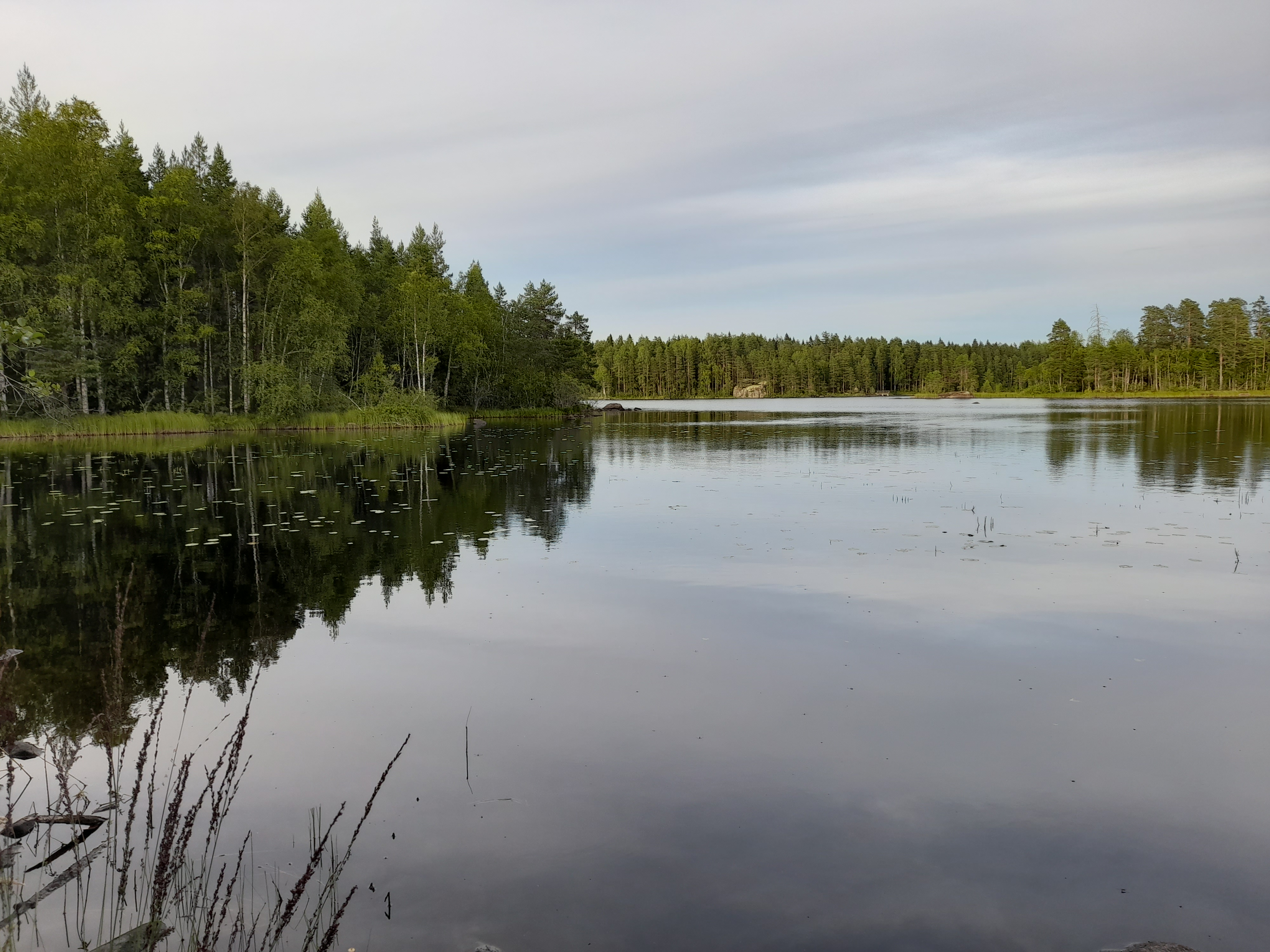
- Lake Saarinen in 2022

- Location within Finland
- Location: Ähtäri, South Ostrobothnia, Finland
- Coordinates: 62°37′26″N 24°17′20″E
- Surface area: 0.61 km^{2} (0.24 sq mi)
- Max. depth: 6.5 m (21 ft)
- Islands: 6

Saarinen is a lake in South Ostrobothnia, Finland, located in the municipality of Ähtäri.

== Geography ==
Saarinen has a surface area of about 61 hectares. The maximum depth of Saarinen is 6.5 metres, but for the most part of the lake the depth is below 3 metres.

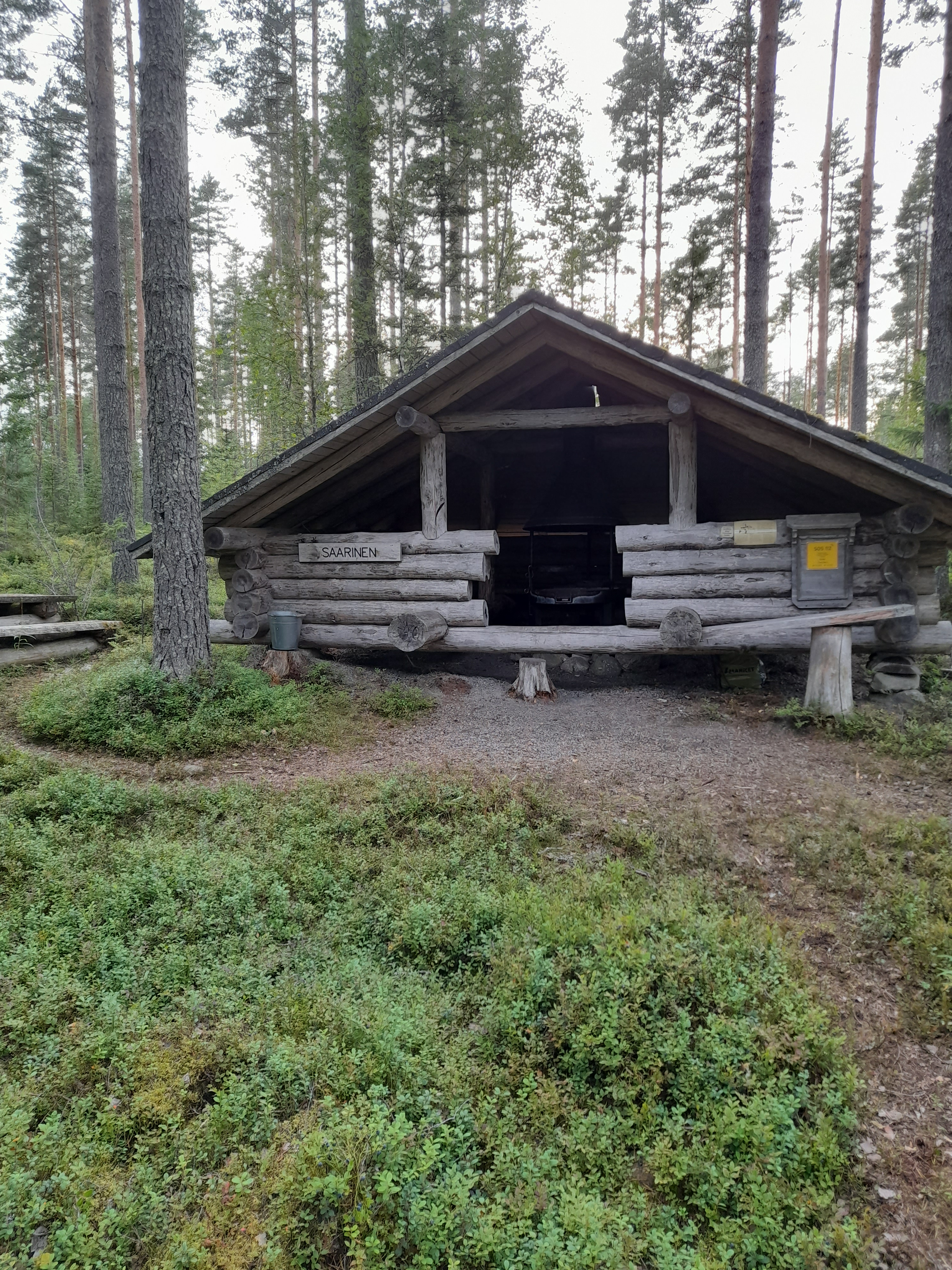
The laavu of Saarinen in 2022.

Saarinen has six islands or islets, of which the largest are two islands collectively called Isotsaaret (meaning "Big Islands"). The others are unnamed. In the southern part of the lake, there is a bay called Pitkälahti ("Long Bay").

== Recreational use ==
The Arpainen outdoor and hiking trail goes along and across the lake, with a laavu right next to the lake. Many cottages have been built along the coast of the lake.

== Water body relations ==
Saarinen belongs to Kokemäenjoki basin. The lake gets its water from lake Pyhikki and correspondingly gives water to many times larger lake Niemisvesi-Pemu through a brook called Lähtevänpuro. A nearby lake is also Iso-Nuoramo.
