= Järviseutu =

Region of South Ostrobothnia, Finland

Järviseutu Järviseudun seutukunta
- Sub-region
- Country: Finland
- Region: South Ostrobothnia
- Capital: Alajärvi

Population (2014)
  - Total: 21,531
- Time zone: UTC+2 (EET)
  - Summer (DST): UTC+3 (EEST)

Järviseutu is a subdivision of South Ostrobothnia and one of the sub-regions of Finland since 2009.

== Municipalities ==
Coat of arms	Municipality
Alajärven vaakuna	Alajärvi (town)
Evijärven vaakuna	Evijärvi (municipality)
Lappajärven vaakuna	Lappajärvi (municipality)
Soinin vaakuna	Soini (municipality)
Vimpelin vaakuna	Vimpeli (municipality)

=== Changes ===
Three changes happened to this sub-region on January 1, 2009:

- Kortesjärvi left the sub-region as it was consolidated with Kauhava.
- Lehtimäki, formerly a part of the Kuusiokunnat sub-region, was consolidated with Alajärvi.
- Soini joined the sub-region.

== Dialects ==
The dialects of the municipalities in the sub-region are very similar to each other. They are considered Savonian dialects, however they lack many characteristic features associated with Savonian speech. These dialects are fairly similar to standard Finnish. A similar dialect is also used in Ähtäri, Keuruu and Pihlajavesi.
