= Capital region =

Region or district surrounding a capital city

A capital region, also called a capital district or capital territory, is a region or district surrounding the country's capital city. It is not always the official term for the region, but may sometimes be used as an informal synonym. Capital regions can exist for either national or subnational capitals.

== National capitals ==
- Australian Capital Territory – Australia
- Brussels-Capital Region – Belgium
- National Capital Region – Canada
- Capital Region of Denmark – Denmark
- Helsinki capital region – Finland
- Capital Region – Iceland
- National Capital Region – India
- Special Capital Region of Jakarta (under relocation process to Specific Capital Region of Nusantara) – Indonesia
- National Capital Region – Japan
- Federal Territory of Kuala Lumpur – Malaysia
- Federal Capital Territory – Nigeria
- Islamabad Capital Territory – Pakistan
- National Capital Region – Philippines
- Seoul Metropolitan Area – South Korea
- Capital Metropolitan Area – Taiwan
- District of Columbia – United States
- Hanoi Capital Region – Vietnam

== Subnational capitals ==
- Edmonton Capital Region – Alberta, Canada
- Capital Regional District – British Columbia, Canada
- Winnipeg Capital Region – Manitoba, Canada
- National Capital – Quebec, Canada
- Mariehamn Capital Region – Åland, Finland
- Andhra Pradesh Capital Region – Andhra Pradesh, India
- Chandigarh Capital Region – Chandigarh, India
- (New York (state)) Capital District – New York State, United States
- Cardiff Capital Region – Wales, United Kingdom

== See also ==
- Capital districts and territories
- Federal district
