= Sääksjärvi =

Sääksjärvi may refer to:

- Sääksjärvi (Jyväskylä), lake in Jyväskylä and Muurame, Finland
- Sääksjärvi (Kokemäki), lake in Kokemäki, Finland
- Sääksjärvi (Nurmijärvi), lake in Nurmijärvi and Hyvinkää, Finland
- Sääksjärvi (village), village in Vimpeli, Finland
