= Lake Evijärvi =

Lake in Evijärvi, Finland

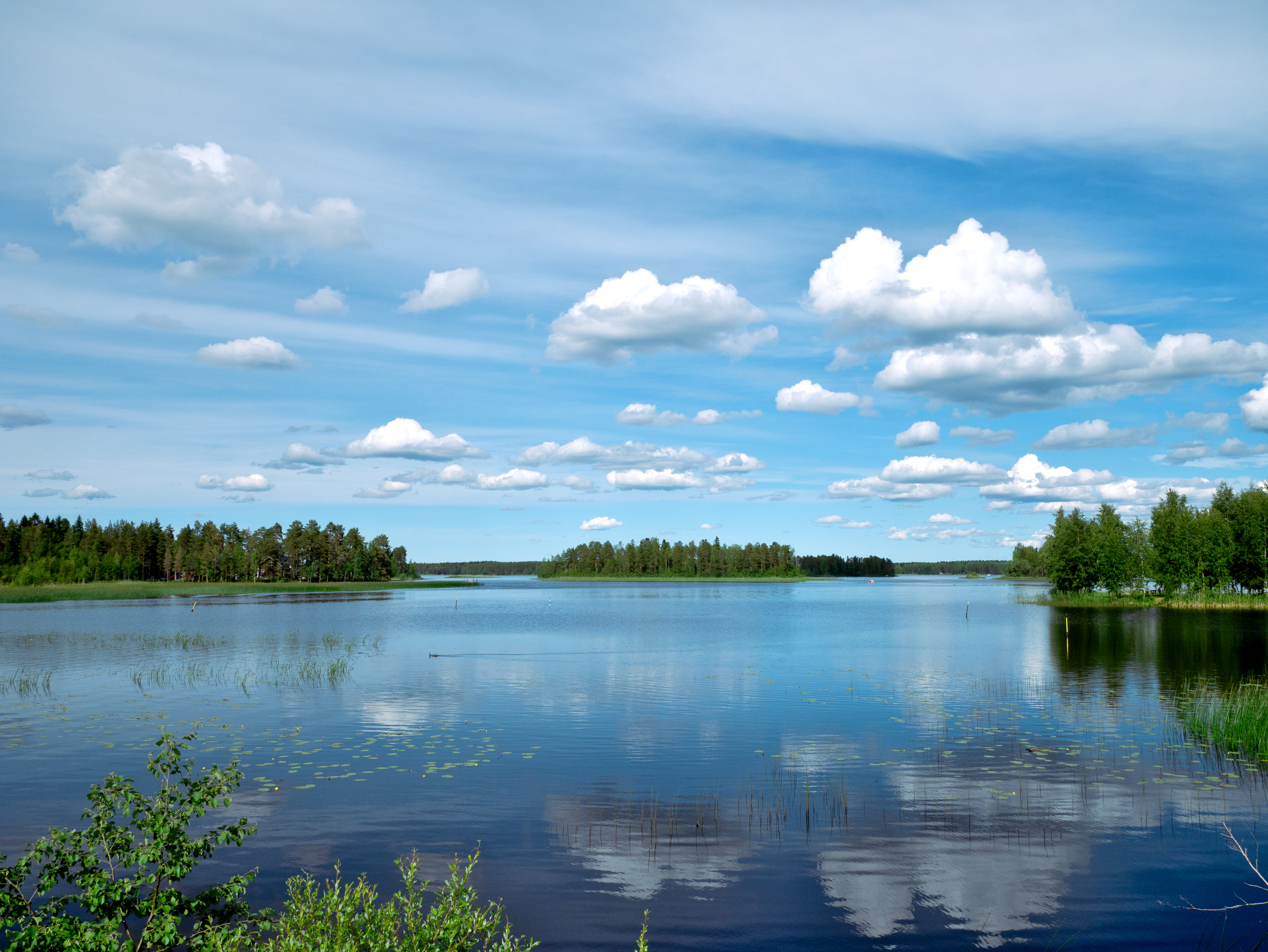

- Location within Finland
- Location: Evijärvi
- Coordinates: 63°24′45″N 23°29′47″E
- Primary outflows: Ähtävänjoki
- Basin countries: Finland
- Surface area: 28 km^{2} (11 sq mi)
- Average depth: 1.7 m (5.6 ft)
- Max. depth: 3.5 m (11 ft)
- Surface elevation: 61.7 m (202 ft)

Lake Evijärvi is a lake of Finland in Evijärvi, South Ostrobothnia region. The lake is part of Ähtävänjoki (Swedish: Esse å) basin.

== See also ==
- List of lakes in Finland
