= Kuortane =

- Municipality
- Kuortaneen kunta Kuortane kommun
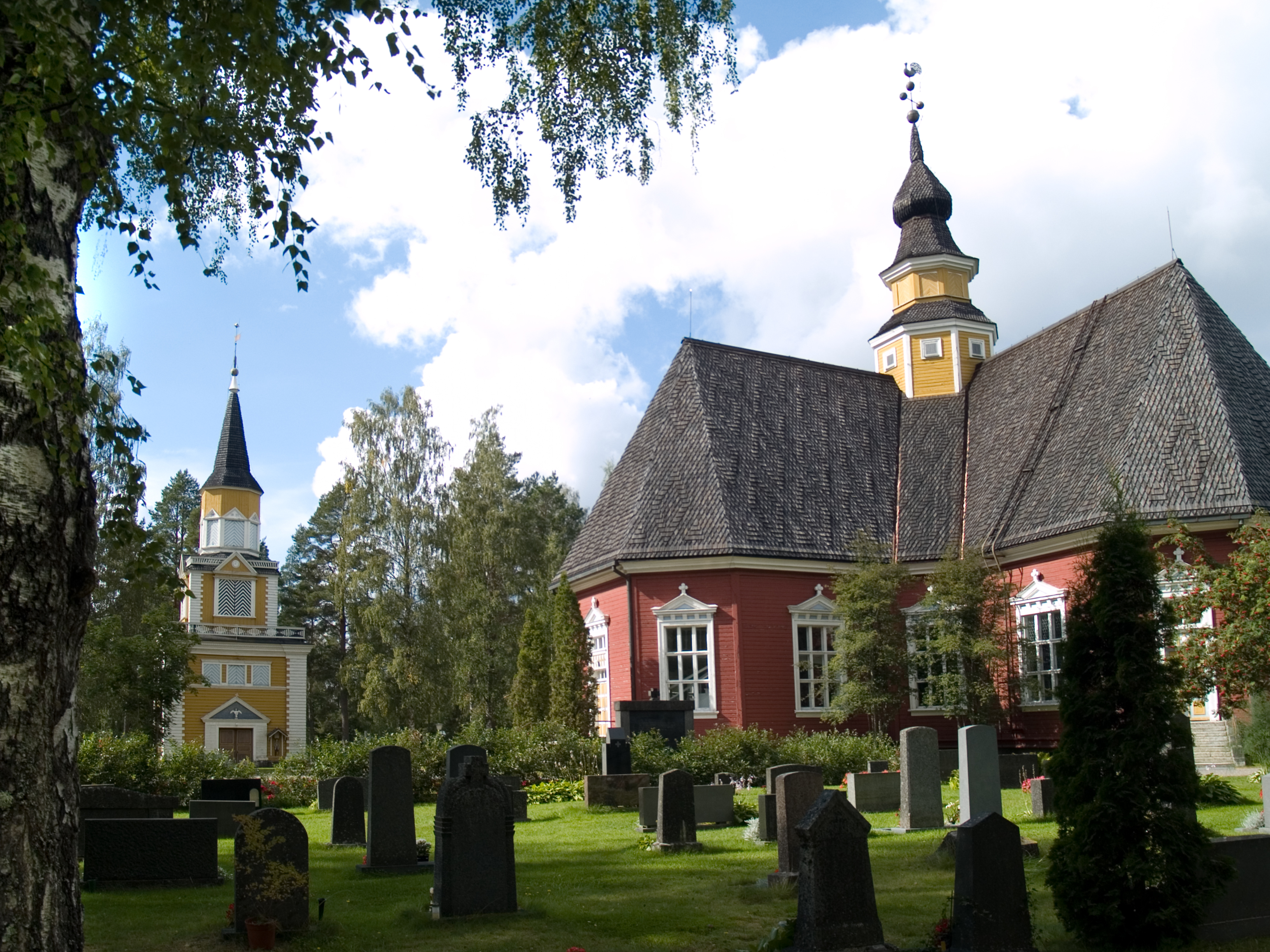
- Old church of Kuortane in 2012

- Coat of arms

- Location of Kuortane in Finland
- Interactive map of Kuortane
- Coordinates: 62°48.5′N 023°30.5′E
- Country: Finland
- Region: South Ostrobothnia
- Sub-region: Kuusiokunnat

Government
  - Municipal manager: Teemu Puolijoki

Area (2018-01-01)
  - Total: 484.88 km^{2} (187.21 sq mi)
  - Land: 462.37 km^{2} (178.52 sq mi)
  - Water: 22.72 km^{2} (8.77 sq mi)
  - Rank: 189th largest in Finland

Population (2025-12-31)
  - Total: 3,306
  - Rank: 206th largest in Finland
  - Density: 7.15/km^{2} (18.5/sq mi)

Population by native language
  - Finnish: 97.1% (official)
  - Others: 2.9%

Population by age
  - 0 to 14: 13.9%
  - 15 to 64: 53.1%
  - 65 or older: 33.1%
- Time zone: UTC+02:00 (EET)
  - Summer (DST): UTC+03:00 (EEST)
- Website: kuortane.fi/en/

Kuortane is a municipality of Finland. It is located in the South Ostrobothnia region. The municipality has a population of 3,306 (31 December 2025) and covers an area of 484.88 square kilometres (187.21 sq mi) of which 22.72 km^{2} (8.77 sq mi) is water. The population density is 7.15 inhabitants per square kilometre (18.5/sq mi). The neighboring municipalities of Kuortane are Alajärvi, Alavus, Lapua and Seinäjoki. The municipality is unilingually Finnish.

Kuortane has a notable history of pine tar production. It is currently well known for the Kuortaneen urheilulukio, a sports institute (Olympic Training centre) and training facility overseen by the Finnish Olympic Committee where many young Finnish athletes study and train. Both the women's national under-18 ice hockey team and Team Kuortane of the Naisten Liiga are based at the institute. It is also known as the birthplace of world-famous architect Alvar Aalto.

== Notable people ==
- Alvar Aalto (1898–1976), architect and designer
- Osmo Ala-Honkola (1939–2020), Olympic sport shooter
- Reino Ala-Kulju (1898–1983), Lutheran clergyman, politician, and teacher
- Mira Suhonen (born 1985), Olympic sport shooter

== See also ==
- Kuortaneen urheilulukio
