= Jalmari Linna =

Finnish politician (1891–1954)

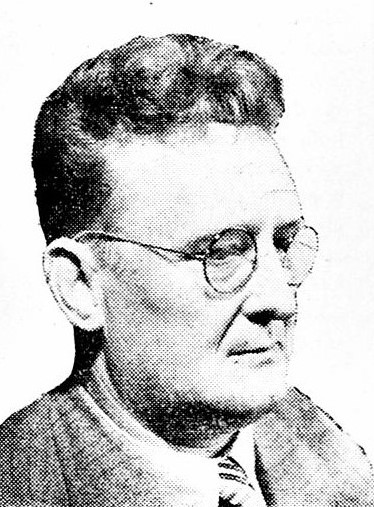
Jalmari Linna, 1939

Antti Jalmar (Jalmari) Linna (10 July 1891 – 7 April 1954) was a Finnish smallholder and politician, born in Evijärvi. He was a member of the Parliament of Finland from 1919 to 1922, from 1927 to 1945 and again from 1949 to 1951, representing the Social Democratic Party of Finland (SDP). He was the father of Ilmari Linna.
