= Pekka Pesola =

Finnish politician

Pekka Antero Pesola (February 27, 1925 – March 28, 2009) was a Finnish lawyer, civil servant, bank director and politician born in Soini. He began his political career in the Liberal League and was a member of the Parliament of Finland from 1966 to 1970, representing the Liberal People's Party (LKP).

Pesola was the banking manager at Kansallis-Osake-Pankki.
