= Kuortaneen urheilulukio =

Finnish secondary school and sports academy

Kuortaneen lukio ja urheilulukio
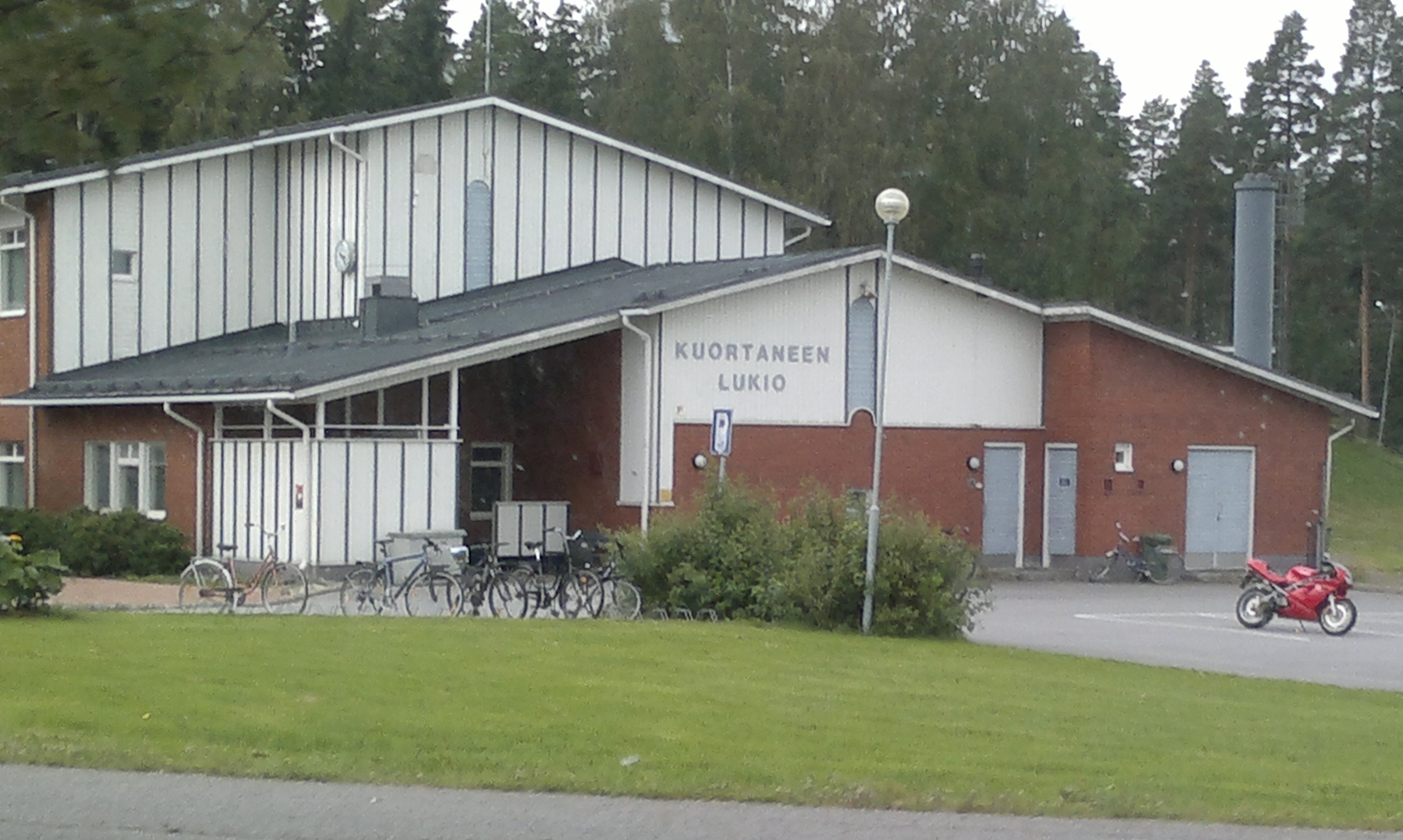

Location
- Keskusti 91; Kuortane, Finland
- Coordinates: 62.8165°N 23.5050°E

Information
- Type: Lukio
- Established: 1949
- Local authority: Kuortane Municipal Board
- Oversight: Finnish Olympic Committee
- Director: Maarit Laitinen
- Principal: Sanna Koivisto
- Staff: 80
- Age range: 14–20
- Enrollment: 250
- Language: Finnish
- Sports: Athletics, bowling, ice hockey,
- Teams: Team Kuortane
- Affiliation: Kuortane Olympic Training Centre (OTC)

Kuortaneen lukio ja urheilulukio or the Kuortane Lukio and Sports Academy is a general and sports-specialised lukio, or school, in Kuortane, Finland.

The sports academy is overseen by the Finnish Olympic Committee and affiliated with the Kuortane Olympic Training Centre, which is situated to the immediate northwest of and shares many facilities with the school.

Olympic gold medalist in javelin, Tapio Korjus, previously served as head of the school.
