= Aukusti Mäenpää =

Finnish politician (1891–1933)

Onni Aukusti Mäenpää (5 January 1891 - 1933) was a Finnish dockworker and politician. He was born in Soini, and sided with the Reds during the Finnish Civil War. When the Red side lost the war he fled to Sweden, where he stayed until 1920. He was a member of the Parliament of Finland from June to October 1930, representing the Socialist Electoral Organisation of Workers and Smallholders (STPV). In 1930 he was abducted by activists of the anti-communist Lapua Movement, who forced him to cross the border to the Soviet Union, after which he settled in the Karelian ASSR. In the spring of 1933, while participating in a lumber floating operation as a union representative, he caught a cold which got worse and eventually led to his death at Petrozavodsk.
