= Lappajärvi Church =

Coordinates: 63.2126°N 23.6482°E

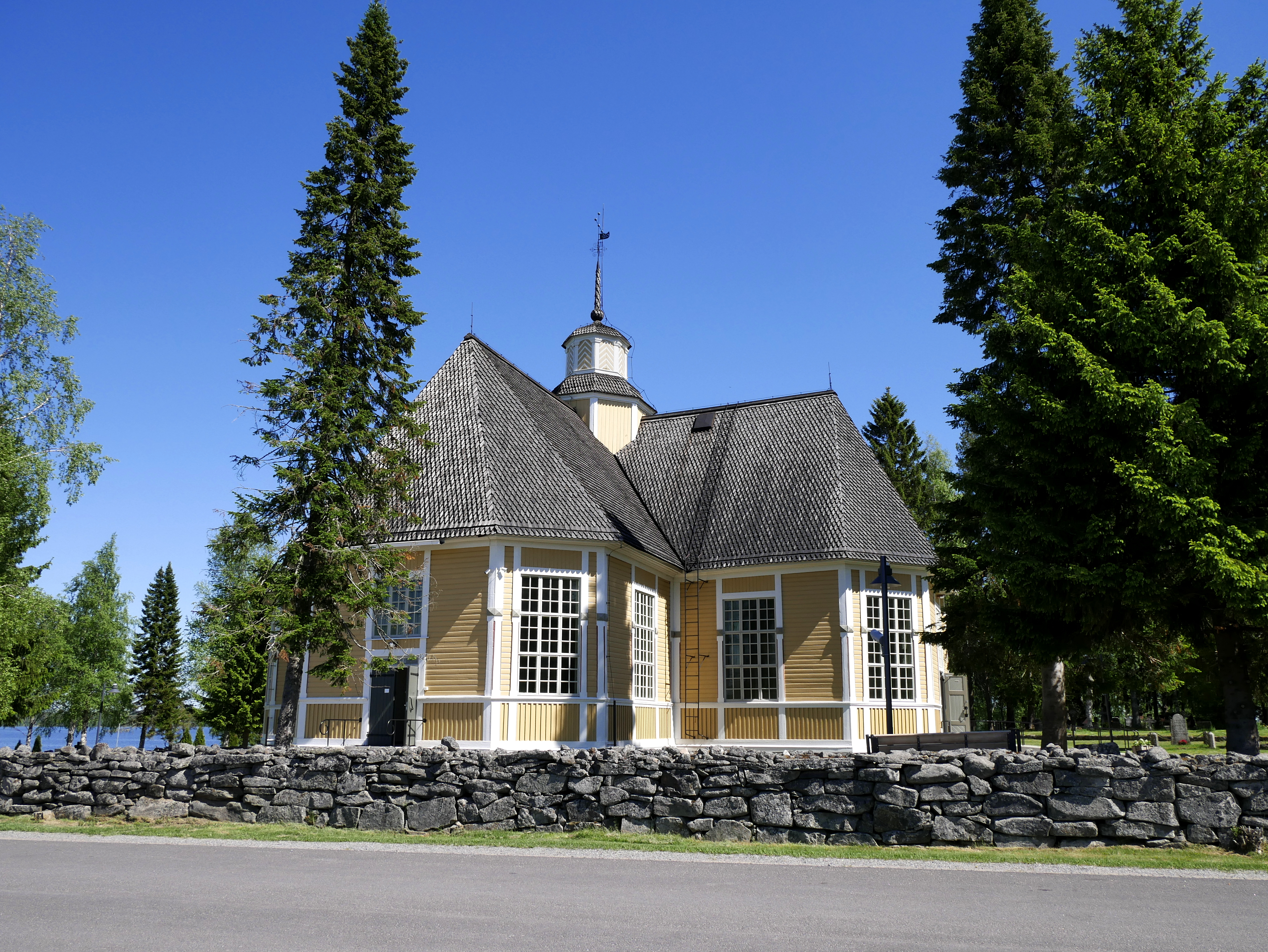
Lappajärvi Church in summer 2017.

Lappajärvi Church (Finnish: Lappajärven kirkko) is a Lutheran church located in Lappajärvi, Finland. The church was designed by Matti Honka and built 1765.
