= Ilmari Linna =

Finnish business executive and politician

Ilmari Linna (27 October 1917, in Evijärvi – 6 March 1981) was a Finnish business executive and politician. He was a member of the Parliament of Finland from 1962 to 1970, representing the Social Democratic Party of Finland (SDP). He was the son of Jalmari Linna.
