= Coat of arms of Lappajärvi =

Coat of arms of Lappajärvi

The coat of arms of Lappajärvi in Finland was drawn by Ahti Hammar and adopted in 1957. The arms refer to Lake Lappajärvi, which gives its name to the municipality and is a meteor crater.

The blazon for the arms may be translated as follows: On blue field a silvery boat equipped with square sail and rudder. Below a golden base rayonny.
