= Toisvesi =

Lake in Finland

- Location within Finland
- Location: Virrat
- Coordinates: 62°23′N 23°51′E
- Catchment area: 1,530 km^{2} (590 sq mi)
- Basin countries: Finland
- Surface area: 29.4 km^{2} (11.4 sq mi)
- Average depth: 19.4 m (64 ft)
- Max. depth: 85 m (279 ft)
- Water volume: 0.529 km^{3} (429,000 acre⋅ft)
- Shore length^{1}: 81.52 km (50.65 mi)
- Surface elevation: 98.1 m (322 ft)
- Frozen: December–April
- Settlements: Virrat
- ^{1} Shore length is not a well-defined measure.

Toisvesi is a medium-sized lake in Finland. It is situated in the municipality of Virrat in the Pirkanmaa region in western Finland. The lake is part of the Kokemäki River basin and a part of a chain of lakes that consist among others of the lakes Ähtärinjärvi, Toisvesi and Tarjanne, which in its turn drains into the Lake Ruovesi. The lake is quite deep by mean depth, and the deepest point is 85 meters under the surface.

== See also ==
- List of lakes in Finland
