= Soini, Finland =

Soini
- Municipality
- Soinin kunta Soini kommun
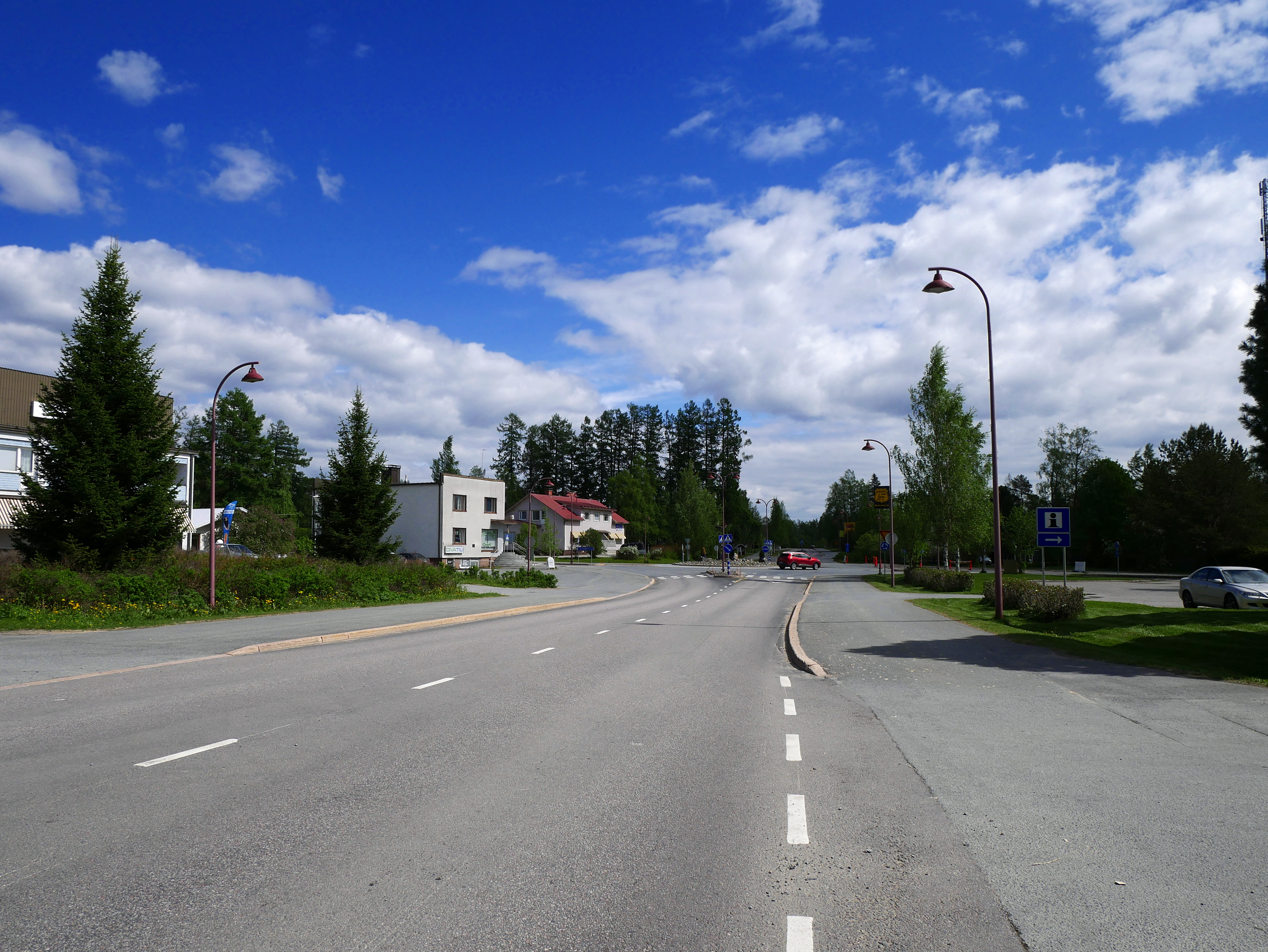

- Coat of arms

- Location of Soini in Finland
- Interactive map of Soini
- Coordinates: 62°52.5′N 24°12.5′E
- Country: Finland
- Region: South Ostrobothnia
- Sub-region: Järviseutu
- Charter: 1868

Government
  - Municipal manager: Maija Pihlajamäki

Area (2018-01-01)
  - Total: 574.22 km^{2} (221.71 sq mi)
  - Land: 551.95 km^{2} (213.11 sq mi)
  - Water: 22.17 km^{2} (8.56 sq mi)
  - Rank: 155th largest in Finland

Population (2025-12-31)
  - Total: 1,772
  - Rank: 264th largest in Finland
  - Density: 3.21/km^{2} (8.3/sq mi)

Population by native language
  - Finnish: 98.2% (official)
  - Others: 1.8%

Population by age
  - 0 to 14: 15.6%
  - 15 to 64: 52.3%
  - 65 or older: 32.1%
- Time zone: UTC+02:00 (EET)
  - Summer (DST): UTC+03:00 (EEST)
- Website: soini.fi

Soini is a municipality of Finland. It is located in the South Ostrobothnia region. The municipality has a population of 1,772 (31 December 2025) and covers an area of 574.22 square kilometres (221.71 sq mi) of which 22.17 km^{2} (8.56 sq mi) is water. The population density is 3.21 inhabitants per square kilometre (8.3/sq mi).

Neighbouring municipalities are Alajärvi, Karstula, Kyyjärvi, Saarijärvi and Ähtäri.

The municipality is unilingually Finnish.

== History ==
The name is derived from the male name Soini, a Finnish variant of the Scandinavian name Sven. The village was first mentioned in 1754 as a part of the Alajärvi parish. Soini gained a chapel in 1784 and a church in 1859. It was fully separated from Alajärvi in 1895. Soini originally had a Swedish name, Konungsåby, which referred to the river Kuninkaanjoki.

== People born in Soini ==
- Aukusti Mäenpää (1891 – 1933)
- Eino Uusitalo (1924 – 2015)
- Pekka Pesola (1925 – 2009)
- Jorma Huuhtanen (1945 – )
- Aulis Akonniemi (1958 – )
- Merja Korpela (1981 – )
- Noora Hautakangas (1984 – )
