= Jorma Huuhtanen =

Finnish politician (born 1945)

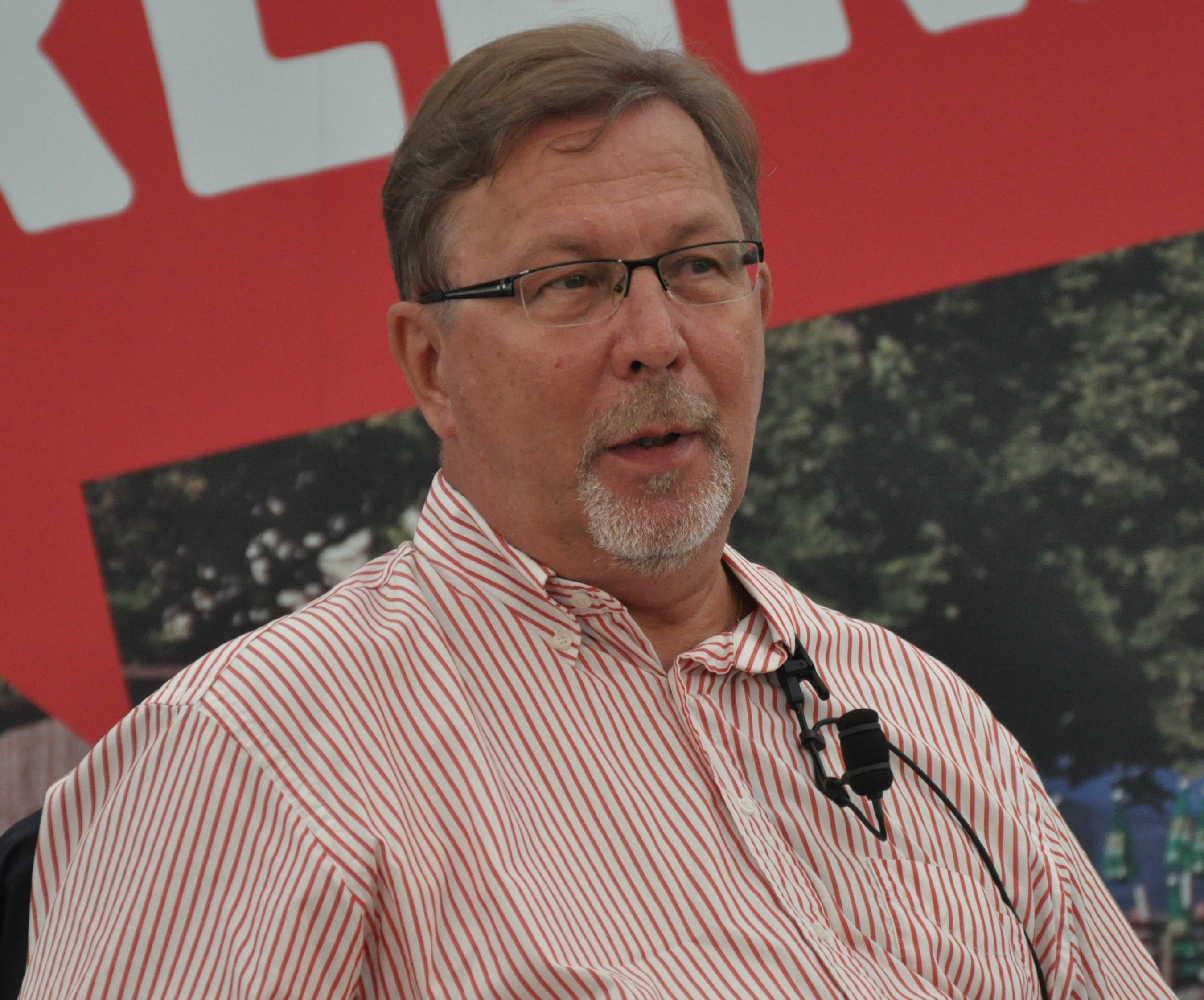
Jorma Huuhtanen, Director General of the Social Insurance Institution of Finland, at SuomiAreena 2010 in Pori.

Jorma Kalevi Huuhtanen (born 26 November 1945) is a Finnish physician, civil servant and politician, born in Soini. He served as Minister of Social Affairs from 24 April 1992 to 13 April 1995. He was a member of the Parliament of Finland from 1987 to 2000, representing the Centre Party. He was the Director General of Kela from 2000 to 2010.
