= Island Field (Vimpeli) =

Pesäpallo stadium in Vimpeli, Finland

- Saarikenttä
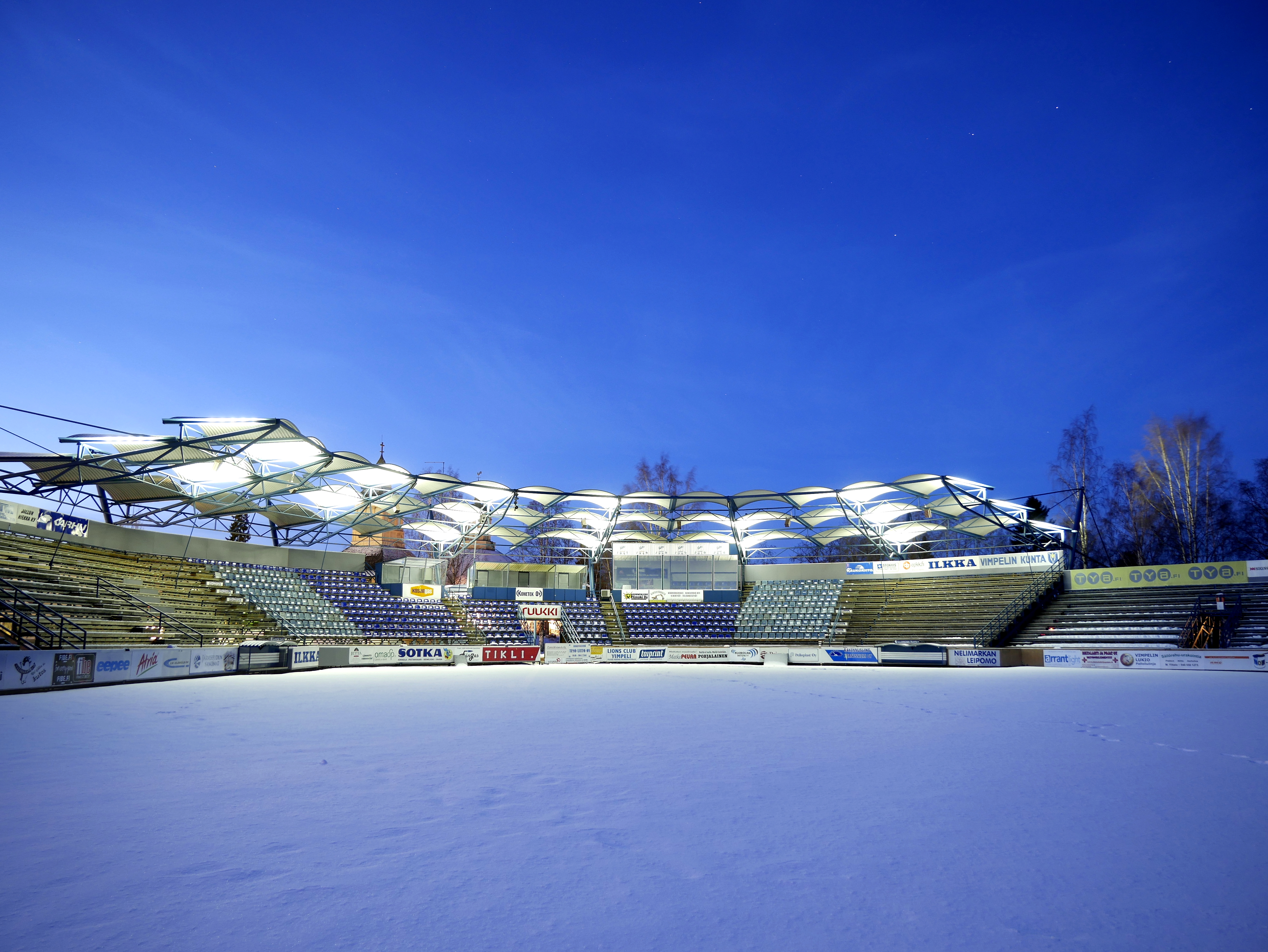
- Island Field in the winter of 2018.

- Location within South Ostrobothnia Location within Finland Location within Europe
- Address: Patruunantie 15; 62800 Vimpeli
- Location: Vimpeli, Finland
- Coordinates: 63.151251°N 23.824504°E
- Owner: Municipality of Vimpeli
- Capacity: 2,590
- Surface: Clay; Grass (Most of outer field); Water (Outer left and outer right fields)
- Record attendance: 5,572; 1990 (All-Star Game)
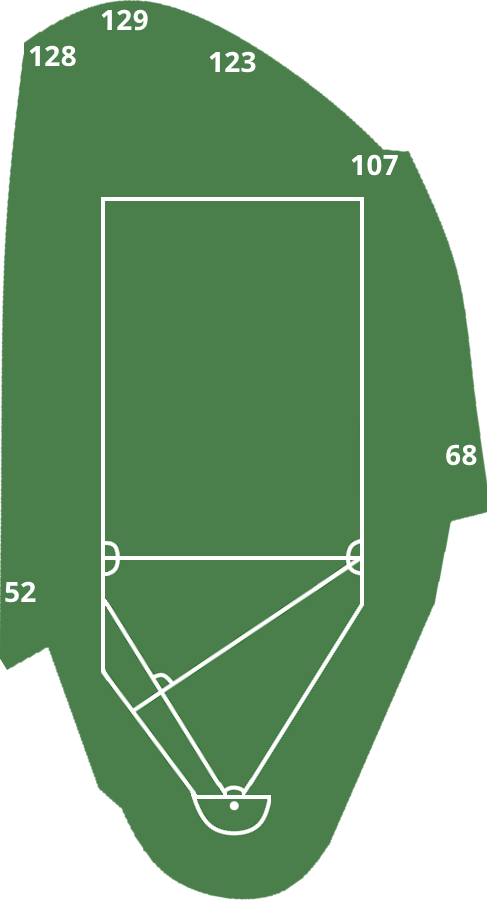
- Field size: Centre field: 123 m (404 ft)
- Public transit: Vimpeli, Matkapeura line 172

Construction
- Opened: 1937

Tenant
- Vimpelin Veto (1937–present)

Island Field (Finnish: Saarikenttä, Swedish: Saarikenttä bobollsstadion) is a pesäpallo stadium located in Vimpeli, Finland. Since its opening in 1937, it has been the home field of the Vimpelin Veto, a Superpesis team. The current grandstand structures were built in 1990. and the sand-based artificial turf was installed in 1994. The current spectator capacity is around 3,000 (with a covered section for 1,500 of them).

The Island Field is located literally on an island in the middle of the Savonjoki. Created in the 1930s on fill land, the pesäpallo field has since been modernised, but is still one of the few pesäpallo fields in Finland where the ball can drift into the water and still be legally playable.

The stadium also hosts the annual concert Saarikenttä Festival, typically in July. The half-marathon race Windal ½-maraton held in the autumn has its start and finish lines inside the stadium.

== Gallery ==
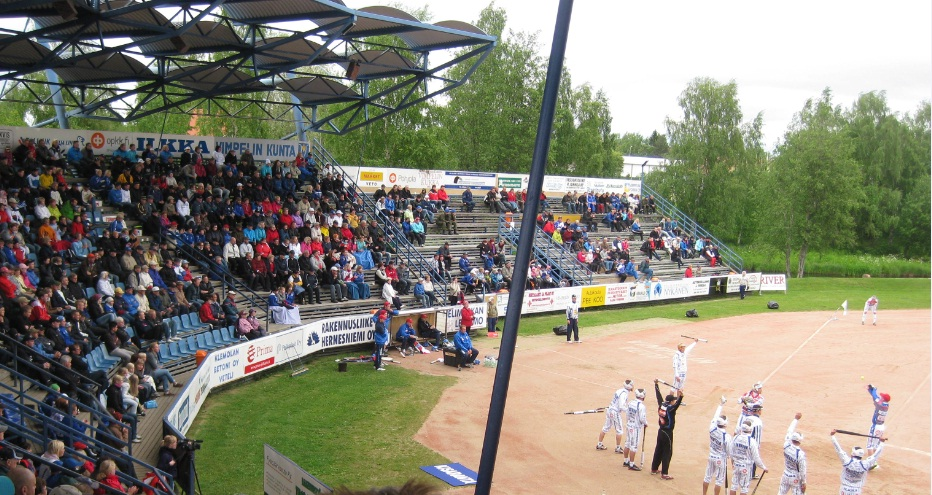
During a pesäpallo match in 2010.
