= Seppo Särkiniemi =

Seppo Antero Särkiniemi (born 11 April 1957 in Lappajärvi) is a Finnish Lutheran clergyman and politician. He was a member of the Parliament of Finland from 2003 to 2007 and again from 2010 to 2011, representing the Centre Party.
