= Arto Melleri =

Finnish poet and writer

- Born: 7 September 1956; Lappajärvi
- Died: 13 May 2005 (aged 48); Helsinki
- Education: Theatre Academy of Helsinki
- Writing career
- Genres: poetry, plays, short stories
- Notable work: Pete Q
- Notable awards: Finlandia Award (1991)

Arto Matti Vihtori Melleri (7 September 1956 in Lappajärvi – 13 May 2005 in Helsinki) was a Finnish poet and writer. Melleri gained fame with the play, Pete Q, in the 1970s. He studied at the Theatre Academy of Helsinki between 1976 and 1980. He was granted an artist's Finnish state pension in 2003.

Melleri was a diverse writer; his output consisted of poetry, collections of short stories, plays, a film script and an opera libretto.

Melleri was an archetype of a Finnish bohemian poet. He was hit by a motorist in 1998, causing him brain damage which eventually led to his death. Melleri was married to Nadja Pyykkö.

Tahvo Hirvonen made a 2003 documentary film about Arto Melleri, called Wanderer of a Lonely Star.
