= Antti Rentola =

Antti Elias Rentola (8 February 1881, Vimpeli – 28 July 1919) was a Finnish Lutheran clergyman and politician. He was a member of the Parliament of Finland from 1917 to 1919, representing the Agrarian League.
