= Sääksjärvi (village) =

- Village
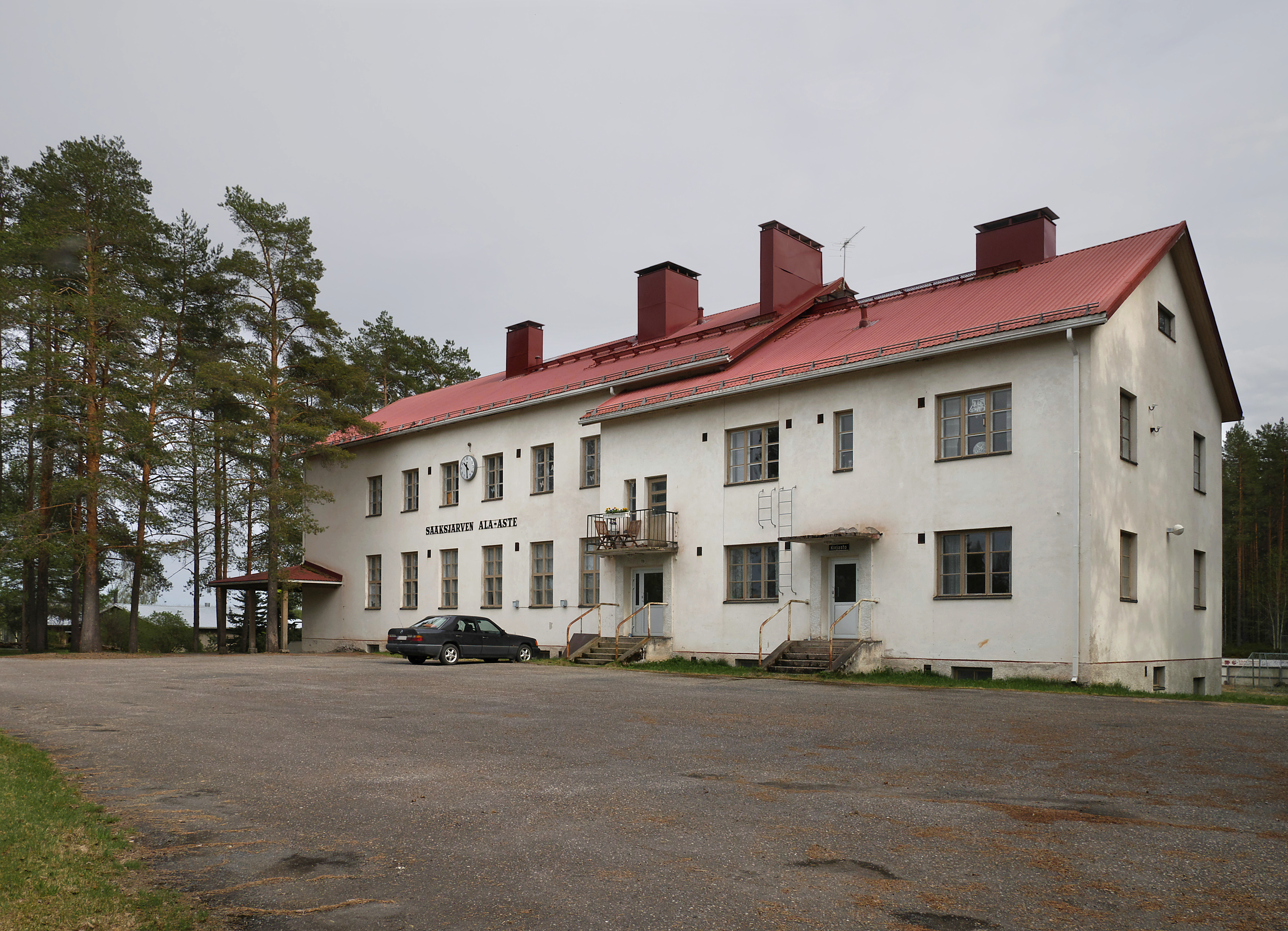
- A former primary school of Sääksjärvi.

- Location in Finland
- Coordinates: 63°13.1607′N 23°58.1568′E
- Country: Finland
- Region: South Ostrobothnia
- Municipality: Vimpeli
- Time zone: UTC+2 (EET)
  - Summer (DST): UTC+3 (EEST)
- Postal code: 62880

Sääksjärvi (Finnish pronunciation: [ˈsæːksˌjærʋi]) is a village in the Vimpeli municipality in South Ostrobothnia, Finland, located about 12 kilometres (7.5 mi) northeast of the municipal centre. The village is named after the lake of the same name, near which it is located.

The village's only school was closed in spring 2016.

== Sources ==
=== Further reading ===
- F. E. Takala (1992). Sääksjärvi - Hallapuro kyläkirja : historiaa, perinnettä ja kotiseututietoa Vimpelin Sääksjärven ja Hallapuron kylistä (in Finnish). Sääksjärven ja Hallapuron kylätoimikunnat. ISBN 952-90-3985-9.
