= Lehtimäki =

- Former municipality
- Lehtimäen kunta Lehtimäki kommun
- Coat of arms

- Location of Lehtimäki in Finland
- Interactive map of Lehtimäki
- Coordinates: 62°49′05″N 23°56′35″E
- Country: Finland
- Region: South Ostrobothnia
- Sub-region: Kuusiokunnat sub-region
- Charter: 1866
- Consolidated: 2009

Area
  - Total: 288.8 km^{2} (111.5 sq mi)
  - Land: 271.84 km^{2} (104.96 sq mi)
  - Water: 16.96 km^{2} (6.55 sq mi)

Population (31 December 2008)
  - Total: 1,849
  - Density: 6.802/km^{2} (17.62/sq mi)
- Time zone: UTC+2 (EET)
  - Summer (DST): UTC+3 (EEST)

Lehtimäki is a former municipality of Finland. It was consolidated with Alajärvi on 1 January 2009.

It is located in the province of Western Finland and is part of the South Ostrobothnia region. The municipality had a population of 1,850 (2006) and covered an area of 291.32 km² of which 18.88 km² was water. The population density was 7.2 inhabitants per km².

The municipality was unilingually Finnish.
