= Hanoi metropolitan area =

Hanoi Metropolitan Area Vùng thủ đô Hà Nội
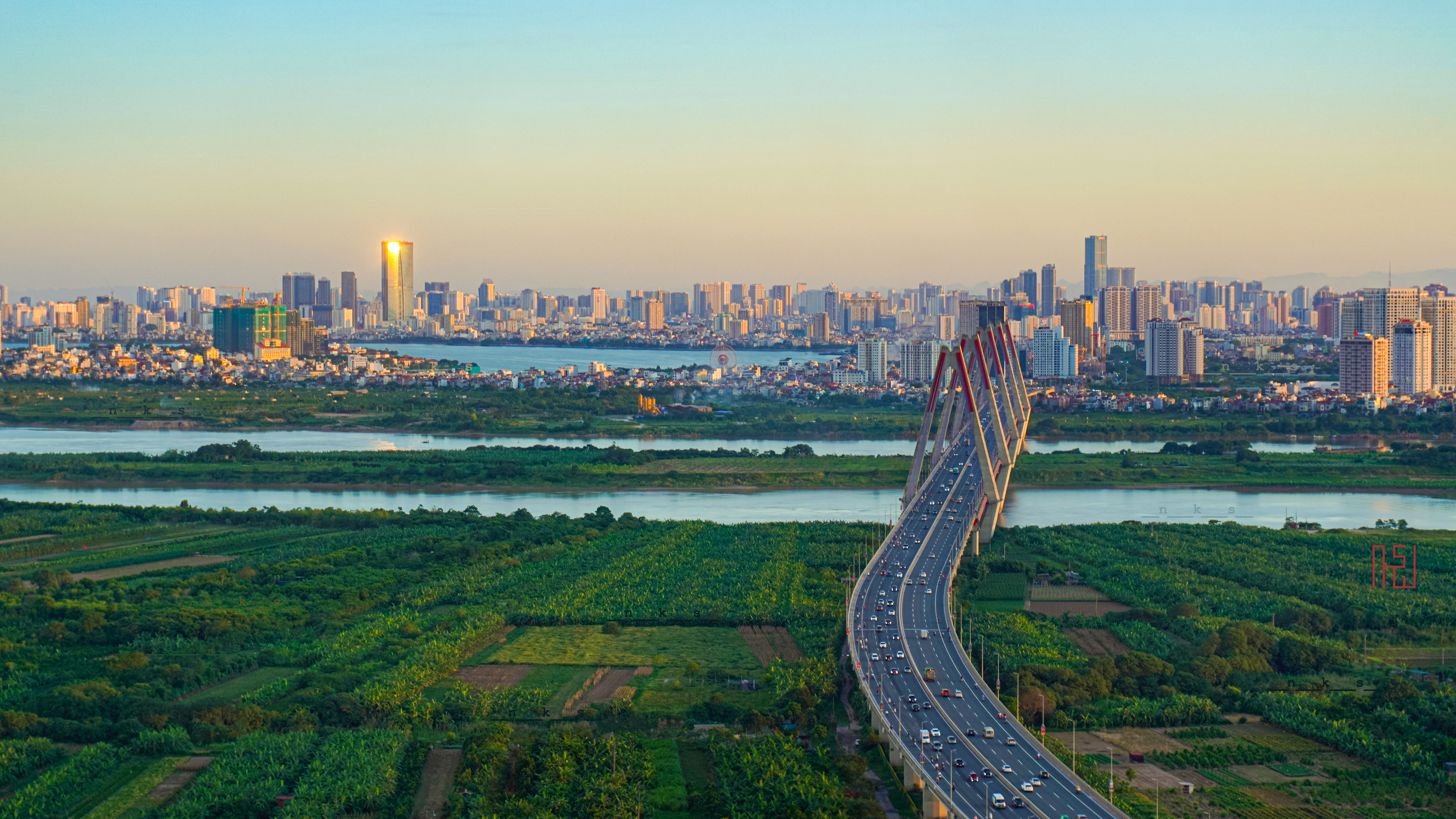
- Hanoi, the largest city in the metropolitan area

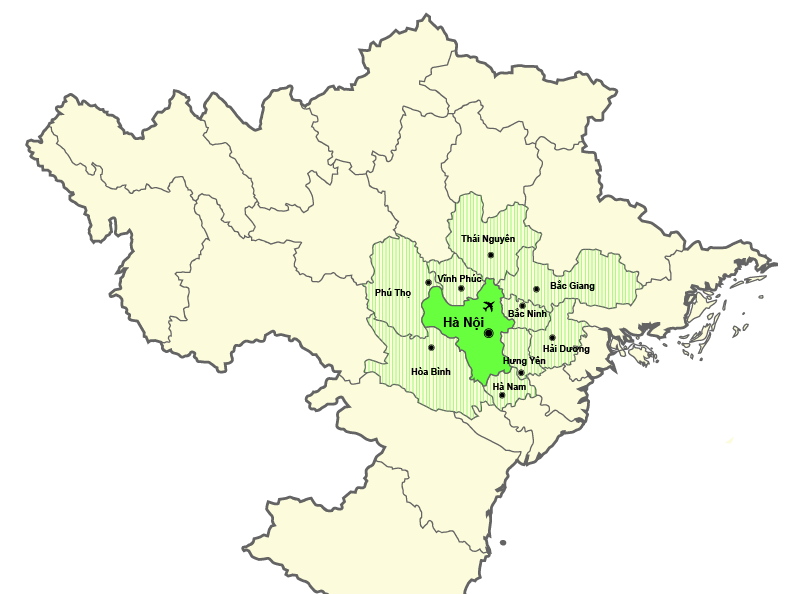
- Map of the Hanoi Metropolitan Area consists of 9 provinces and Hanoi City.
- Country: Vietnam
- Subdivisions: 1 municipality and 9 provinces: - Hanoi; - Vĩnh Phúc province; - Hải Dương province; - Hưng Yên province; - Bắc Ninh province; - Bắc Giang province; - Thái Nguyên province; - Phú Thọ province; - Hòa Bình province; - Hà Nam province

Area
  - Metro: 24,390 km^{2} (9,420 sq mi)

Population
  - Metro: 19,795,805
  - Metro density: 811.6/km^{2} (2,102/sq mi)

GDP
  - Metro: US$97.2 billion (2023)
- Time zone: UTC+7 (UTC +7)

Hanoi metropolitan area (Vietnamese: Vùng thủ đô Hà Nội) is a metropolitan area currently planned by the government of Vietnam.

== History ==
This metropolitan area was created by Decision 490/QD-TTg dated May 5, 2008, of the Prime Minister of Vietnam. Hanoi will be the core city of this metropolitan area. Other parts will include provinces: Vĩnh Phúc Province, Hưng Yên Province, Bắc Ninh Province, Hải Dương Province, Hà Nam Province, Hòa Bình, Bắc Giang Province, Phú Thọ Province and Thái Nguyên Province with an area of 24,314.7 km^{2}, half of the size of Greater Ho Chi Minh City, the same for population size planning.

As Hà Tây was merged into Hanoi by a resolution of the National Assembly of Vietnam in June 2008, this metropolitan area will include Hanoi and six surrounding provinces.

As 2012, this Metropolitan area will include Hanoi and nine Provinces.

As of 2012, this metropolitan area has a population of 17 million, of which 4.6 million live in urban areas. By 2020, the numbers will be 20-22 and 12-13 million, respectively.

In 2025, Vietnam changed its administrative structure again, with new arrangements for provinces and local administrative areas. These changes affected how the Hanoi metropolitan area and surrounding region are defined, making older population figures difficult to compare directly with newer ones.

=== Component localities ===
This metropolitan area will straddle in following provinces:

- Hanoi
- Vĩnh Phúc Province
- Hải Dương Province
- Hưng Yên Province
- Bắc Ninh Province
- Bắc Giang Province
- Thái Nguyên Province
- Phú Thọ Province
- Hòa Bình Province
- Hà Nam Province

=== Major cities ===
Current cities and towns (as of 2012) :

- Hanoi, core city
- Hải Dương
- Bắc Ninh
- Vĩnh Yên
- Phủ Lý
- Hưng Yên
- Hòa Bình
- Bắc Giang
- Việt Trì
- Thái Nguyên
- Sơn Tây Town

Major adjacent cities:

- Hai Phong, major port city
- Hạ Long, major port city
- Nam Định

== See also ==
- Ho Chi Minh City metropolitan area
