= Lappajärvi =

- Municipality
- Lappajärven kunta Lappajärvi kommun
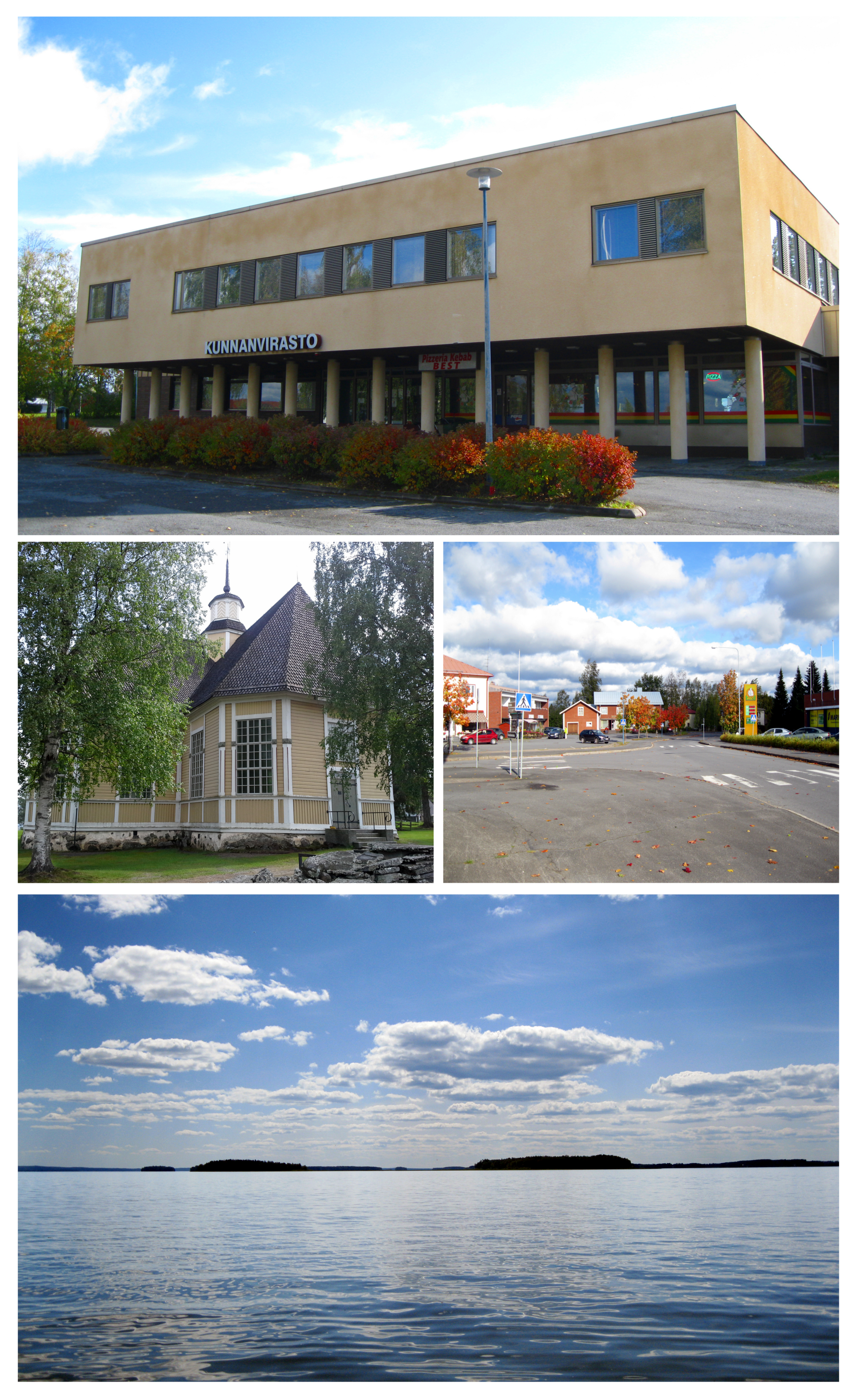

- Coat of arms

- Location of Lappajärvi in Finland
- Interactive map of Lappajärvi
- Coordinates: 63°13′N 023°38′E
- Country: Finland
- Region: South Ostrobothnia
- Sub-region: Järviseutu
- Charter: 1865

Government
  - Municipal manager: Sami Alasara

Area (2018-01-01)
  - Total: 522.98 km^{2} (201.92 sq mi)
  - Land: 420.89 km^{2} (162.51 sq mi)
  - Water: 102.89 km^{2} (39.73 sq mi)
  - Rank: 200th largest in Finland

Population (2025-12-31)
  - Total: 2,704
  - Rank: 225th largest in Finland
  - Density: 6.42/km^{2} (16.6/sq mi)

Population by native language
  - Finnish: 92.4% (official)
  - Swedish: 0.5%
  - Others: 7.1%

Population by age
  - 0 to 14: 13.9%
  - 15 to 64: 50.3%
  - 65 or older: 35.8%
- Time zone: UTC+02:00 (EET)
  - Summer (DST): UTC+03:00 (EEST)
- Website: lappajarvi.fi

Lappajärvi is a municipality in Finland's South Ostrobothnia region. It is located 78 kilometres (48 mi) from Seinäjoki, 80 kilometres (50 mi) from Kokkola and 117 kilometres (73 mi) from Vaasa. The municipality has a population of 2,704 (31 December 2025) and covers an area of 522.98 square kilometres (201.92 sq mi) of which 102.89 km^{2} (39.73 sq mi), or nearly 20% is water. The population density is 6.42 inhabitants per square kilometre (16.6/sq mi).

The municipality is unilingually Finnish.

Lake Lappajärvi, which gives the name to the municipality, is a meteor crater, one of the few meteor crater lakes found in Finland.

Singer and performer, Timo Kotipelto from the worldwide known Finnish power metal band Stratovarius was born and raised in Lappajärvi.

== Notable people born in Lappajärvi ==
- Johannes Bäck (1872–1952)
- Aleksi Hakala (1886–1959)
- Veikko Savela (1919–2015)
- Jarmo Övermark (1955–)
- Arto Melleri (1956–2005)
- Seppo Särkiniemi (1957–)
- Jussi Lampi (1961–)
- Timo Kotipelto (1969–)
- Petra Olli (1994–)

== See also ==
- Lappajärvi Church
