= Mariehamn sub-region =

Finnish subregion

Mariehamn sub-region Mariehamns stad
- Sub-region
- Country: Finland
- Region: Åland

Population (2011)
  - Total: 11,209
- Time zone: UTC+2 (EET)
  - Summer (DST): UTC+3 (EEST)

Mariehamn sub-region (Swedish: Mariehamns stad) is a subdivision of Åland and one of the sub-regions of Finland since 2009.

== Municipalities ==
Coat of arms	Municipality
Maarianhaminan vaakuna	Mariehamn (city)
