= Ähtäri =

Ähtäri Etseri
- Town
- Ähtärin kaupunki Etseri stad
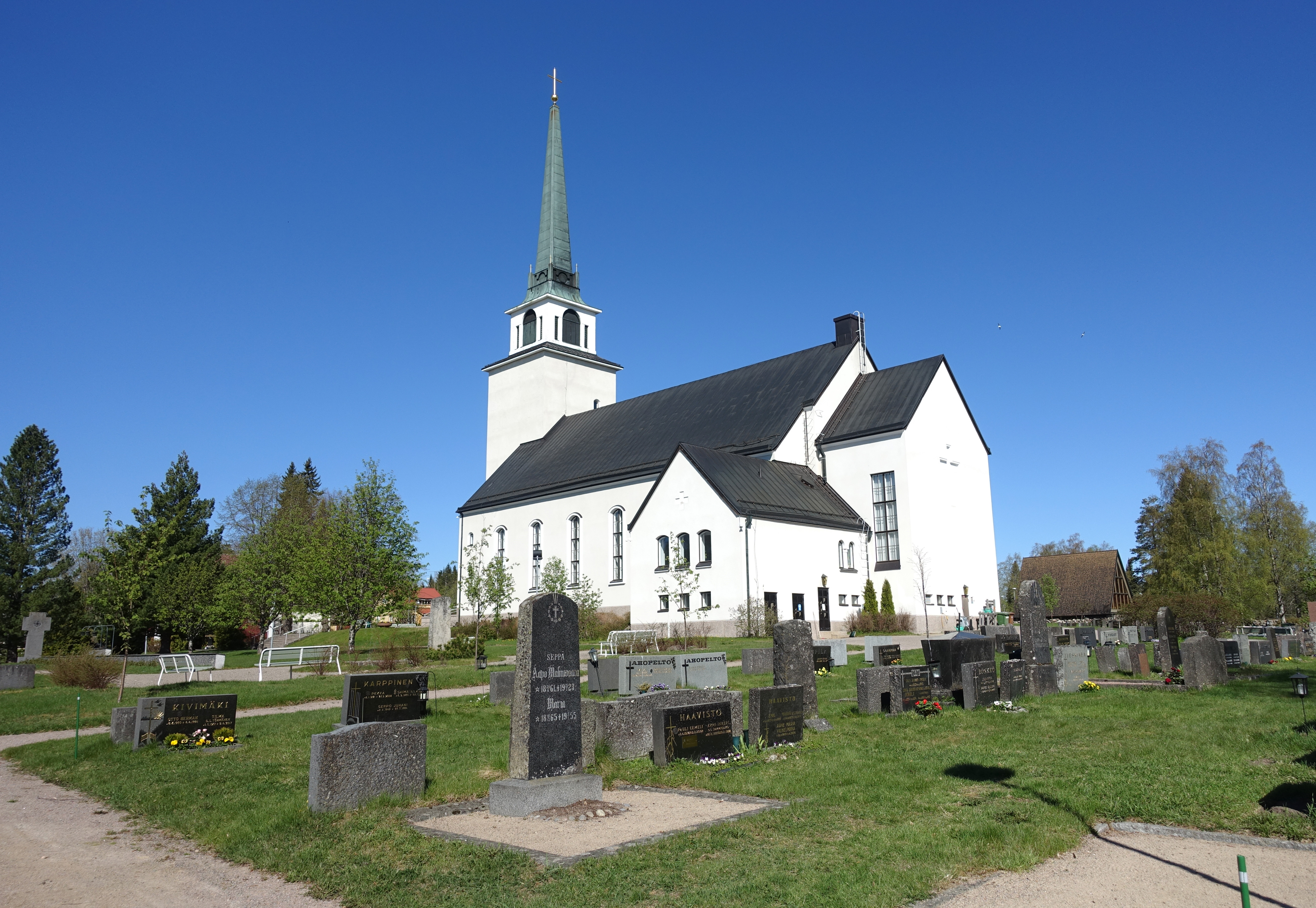
- Ähtäri Church was designed by architect Bertel Liljequist, and built in 1937.

- Coat of arms

- Location of Ähtäri in Finland
- Interactive map of Ähtäri
- Coordinates: 62°33′N 024°04′E
- Country: Finland
- Region: South Ostrobothnia
- Sub-region: Kuusiokunnat
- Charter: 1867
- Town privileges: 1986

Government
  - Town manager: Perttu Sonninen

Area (2018-01-01)
  - Total: 910.87 km^{2} (351.69 sq mi)
  - Land: 805.81 km^{2} (311.12 sq mi)
  - Water: 105 km^{2} (41 sq mi)
  - Rank: 97th largest in Finland

Population (2025-12-31)
  - Total: 5,121
  - Rank: 163rd largest in Finland
  - Density: 6.36/km^{2} (16.5/sq mi)

Population by native language
  - Finnish: 96.5% (official)
  - Others: 3.5%

Population by age
  - 0 to 14: 13.4%
  - 15 to 64: 52.9%
  - 65 or older: 33.7%
- Time zone: UTC+02:00 (EET)
  - Summer (DST): UTC+03:00 (EEST)
- Website: www.ahtari.fi

Ähtäri (Swedish: Etseri) is a town and municipality of Finland. It is located in the South Ostrobothnia region. The town has a population of 5,121 (31 December 2025) and covers an area of 910.87 square kilometres (351.69 sq mi) of which 105 km^{2} (41 sq mi) is water. The population density is 6.36 inhabitants per square kilometre (16.5/sq mi). Ähtäri is located 83 kilometres (52 mi) southeast of Seinäjoki.

The municipality is unilingually Finnish.

Ähtäri is known for its zoo and hotel Mesikämmen designed by Timo and Tuomo Suomalainen which is partly built within bedrock. The biggest lake in the area is Ähtärinjärvi. There is also a relatively old and small board mill called Vääräkosken Pahvi in Ähtäri.

The largest private sector employers are Inhan Tehtaat, Silver-Veneet, Tankki, and Muovilami.

== Notable people ==
- Anton Collin, cross country skier and road cyclist
- Eero Hiironen, sculptor and painter
- Kari Hirvonen, singer and Tango King
- Aki Hintsa, sports physician and orthopedic surgeon
- Toivo Korpela, preacher and speaker; fervent Laestadian and founder of the Korpela movement
- Niko Korsumäki, Snowcrossing World Championship bronze medalist
- Esa Latva-Äijö, actor
- Veikko Mattila, Member of Parliament
- Matti Pekkanen, engineer and politician
- Emanuel Pohjaväre, Member of Parliament
- Mikko Savola, Member of Parliament
- Topi Sorsakoski, musician
- Antti Tammilehto, musician
- Seppo Tammilehto, musician
- Edvard Valpas-Hänninen, former chairman of the Social Democratic Party of Finland

== Notable groups ==
- Noumena, melodic death metal band

== See also ==
- Finnish national road 58
