= Sub-regions of Finland =

Administrative subdivisions formed in 1994

Sub-regions (Finnish: seutukunta, Swedish: ekonomisk region) are divisions used for statistical purposes in Finland. The country is divided into 69 sub-regions, which are formed by groups of municipalities within the 19 regions of Finland. These sub-regions represent a LAU 1 level of division used in conjunction with the Nomenclature of Territorial Units for Statistics.

Each municipality is a member of a sub-region based on cooperation between municipalities and the commuter area. The member municipalities must be from the same region.

Sub-regions were introduced as administrative divisions in 1994. Sub-regions are no longer official regional administrative divisions since 2014, but they are still valid for statistical purposes.

== Sub-regions grouped by regions ==
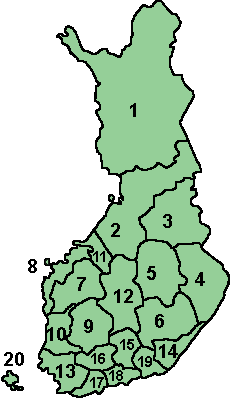
Regions of Finland.

=== Lapland (1) ===
- Eastern Lapland
- Kemi-Tornio sub-region
- Northern Lapland
- Rovaniemi sub-region
- Torne Valley sub-region
- Fell Lapland (Tunturi-Lappi)

=== North Ostrobothnia (2) ===
- Koillismaa
- Nivala-Haapajärvi sub-region
- Oulu sub-region
- Oulunkaari
- Raahe sub-region
- Siikalatva sub-region
- Ylivieska sub-region

=== Kainuu (3) ===
- Kajaani sub-region
- Kehys-Kainuu

=== North Karelia (4) ===
- Central Karelia
- Joensuu sub-region
- Pielinen Karelia

=== North Savo (5) ===
- Inner Savo
- Kuopio sub-region
- Northeast Savo
- Upper Savo
- Varkaus sub-region

=== South Savo (6) ===
- Mikkeli sub-region
- Pieksämäki sub-region
- Savonlinna sub-region

=== South Ostrobothnia (7) ===
- Järviseutu
- Kuusiokunnat
- Seinäjoki sub-region
- Suupohja

=== Ostrobothnia (8) ===
- Sydösterbotten
- Jakobstad sub-region
- Vaasa sub-region

==== Former sub-regions ====
- Kyrönmaa (abolished in 2021)

=== Pirkanmaa (9) ===
- North Western Pirkanmaa
- South Western Pirkanmaa
- Southern Pirkanmaa
- Tampere sub-region
- Upper Pirkanmaa

==== Former sub-regions ====
- South Eastern Pirkanmaa

=== Satakunta (10) ===
- Northern Satakunta
- Pori sub-region
- Rauma sub-region

=== Central Ostrobothnia (11) ===
- Kaustinen sub-region
- Kokkola sub-region

=== Central Finland (12) ===
- Äänekoski sub-region
- Jämsä sub-region
- Joutsa sub-region
- Jyväskylä sub-region
- Keuruu sub-region
- Saarijärvi-Viitasaari sub-region

=== Southwest Finland (13) ===
- Loimaa sub-region
- Salo sub-region
- Turku sub-region
- Vakka-Suomi
- Åboland

=== South Karelia (14) ===
- Imatra sub-region
- Lappeenranta sub-region

=== Päijät-Häme (15) ===
- Lahti sub-region

==== Former sub-regions ====
- Heinola sub-region (merged into Lahti sub-region in 2010)

=== Kanta-Häme (16) ===
- Forssa sub-region
- Hämeenlinna sub-region
- Riihimäki sub-region

=== Uusimaa (17 and 18) ===
- Helsinki sub-region
- Loviisa sub-region
- Porvoo sub-region
- Raseborg sub-region

==== Former sub-regions ====
- Lohja sub-region (merged into Helsinki sub-region in 2009)

=== Kymenlaakso (19) ===
- Kotka-Hamina sub-region
- Kouvola sub-region

=== Åland (20) ===
- Archipelago (Åland)
- Countryside (Åland)
- Mariehamn sub-region
