= South Ostrobothnia =

Region of Finland

South Ostrobothnia Etelä-Pohjanmaa (Finnish) Södra Österbotten (Swedish)
- Region
- Region of South Ostrobothnia; Etelä-Pohjanmaan maakunta Landskapet Södra Österbotten
- Flag Coat of arms

- South Ostrobothnia on a map of Finland
- Coordinates: 62°45′N 22°30′E
- Country: Finland
- Historical province: Ostrobothnia, Satakunta
- Capital: Seinäjoki
- Other towns: Ähtäri, Alajärvi, Alavus, Kauhajoki, Kauhava, Kurikka and Lapua

Government
  - Regional Mayor: Heli Seppelvirta

Area
  - Total: 13,999.63 km^{2} (5,405.29 sq mi)

Population (2021)
  - Total: 191,762
  - Density: 13.6976/km^{2} (35.4767/sq mi)

GDP
  - Total: €5.856 billion (2015)
  - Per capita: €30,344 (2015)
- ISO 3166 code: FI-03
- NUTS: 194
- Regional animal: Red squirrel (Sciurus vulgaris)
- Regional bird: Eurasian curlew (Numenius arquata)
- Regional fish: European whitefish (Coregonus lavaretus)
- Regional flower: Fireweed (Epilobium angustifolium)
- Regional stone: Impactite
- Regional lake: Lake Lappajärvi
- Website: etelapohjanmaa.fi

South Ostrobothnia (Finnish: Etelä-Pohjanmaa [ˈetelæˌpohjɑmˌmɑː]; Swedish: Södra Österbotten) is one of the 19 regions of Finland. It borders the regions of Ostrobothnia, Central Ostrobothnia, Central Finland, Pirkanmaa, and Satakunta. Among the Finnish regions, South Ostrobothnia is the ninth largest in terms of population. Seinäjoki is the regional centre and by far the largest city in the area.

As a cultural area, South Ostrobothnia is larger than its current regional borders and includes the region of Ostrobothnia as well.

== History ==
South Ostrobothnia had its first permanent settlements during the Iron Age. Swedish control began in the 12th century, leaving a lasting impact on the region's cultural identity. Swedish remains a spoken language alongside Finnish. In 1809, Finland, including South Ostrobothnia, became part of the Russian Empire as the Grand Duchy of Finland. The region endured hardships during the tumultuous 19th century, including the Crimean War (1853–1856) and the throes of industrialization. The early 19th century also saw the rise of religious revival movements like Pietism, shaping the region's social fabric. Finland gained independence in 1917, and South Ostrobothnia played a role in the nation-building process. The 20th century witnessed significant industrial development, with metalworking, machinery, and electronics becoming major contributors to the economy. Despite the devastation of the Winter War (1939–1945) against the Soviet Union, the region persevered. Since the mid-20th century, the economy has diversified, with the service sector playing an increasingly important role.

== Geography ==
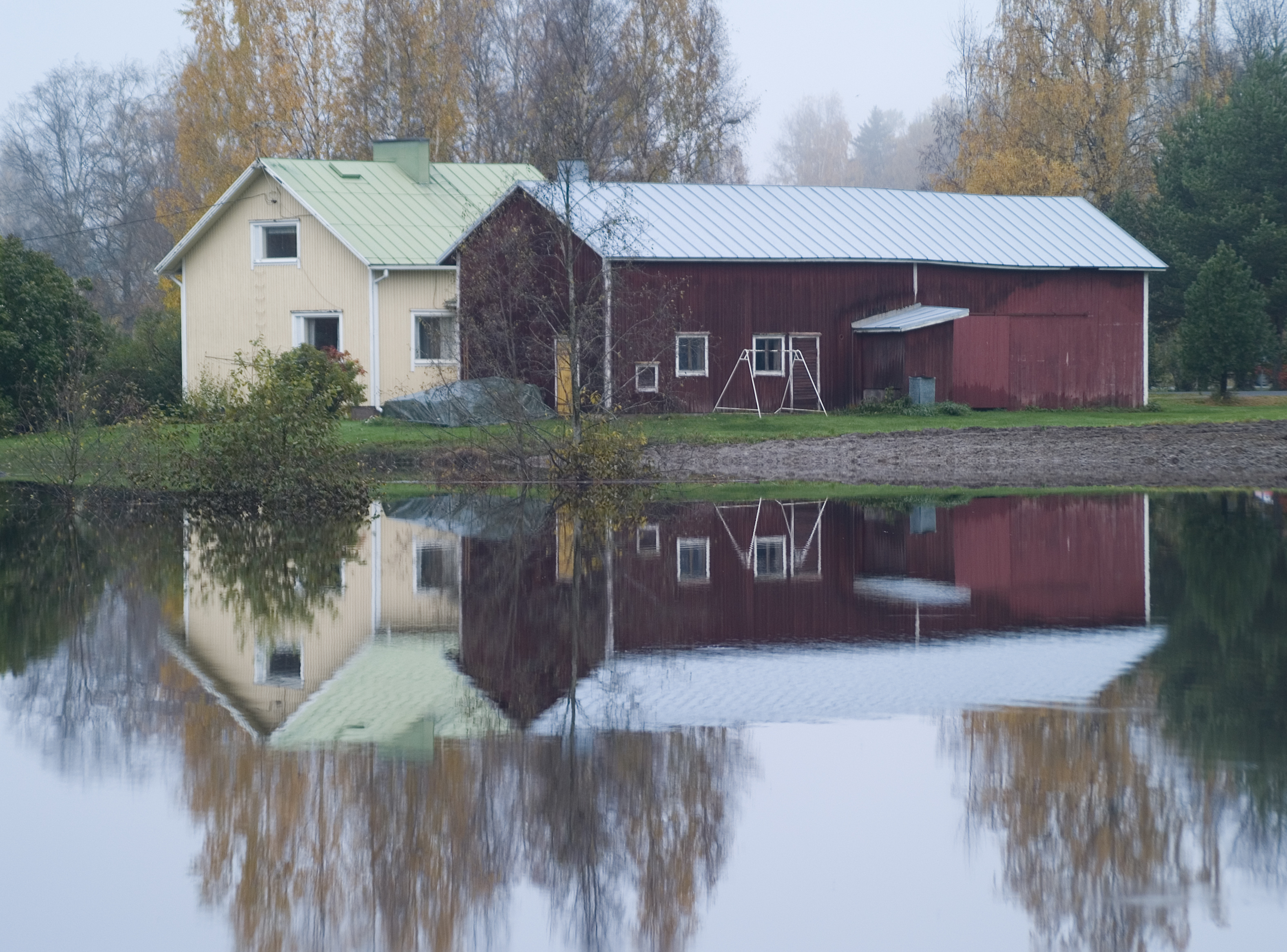
A flood in Ilmajoki

The natural landscape of South Ostrobothnia is mainly expanses, which is Finland's largest plain area. South Ostrobothnia is connected to the coastal region of the Gulf of Bothnia in the west, to the river country of Central Ostrobothnia in the north, and to Suomenselkä in the east and south, which is the watershed between the regions of Ostrobothnia and Finnish Lakeland. The land surface rises gently from the coast inland, and the 100-meter height level is reached about 100 kilometers from the coast.

The river valleys of South Ostrobothnia have traditionally been flood-prone areas.

== Culture ==
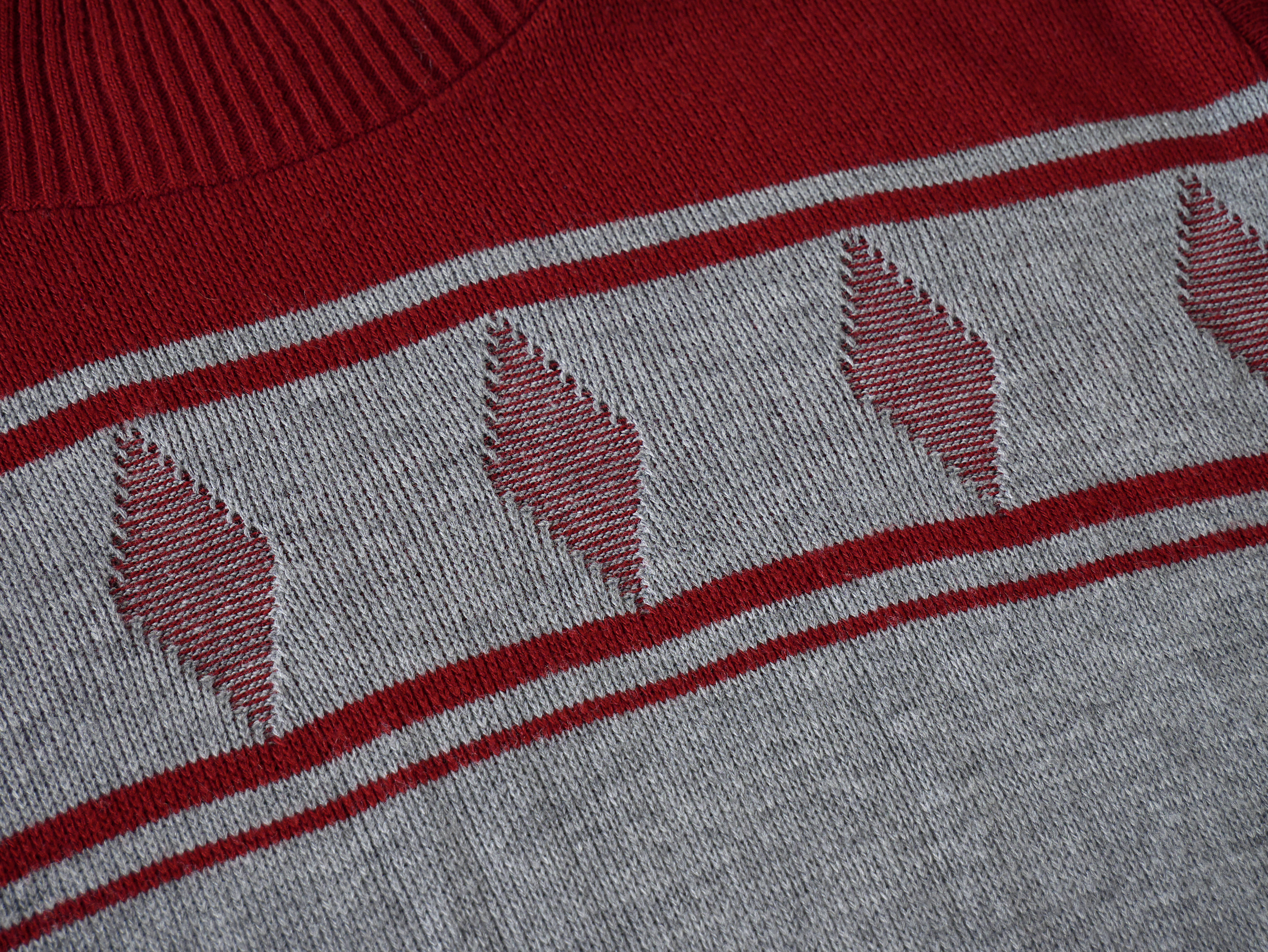
Patterning of the traditional jussipaita sweater.

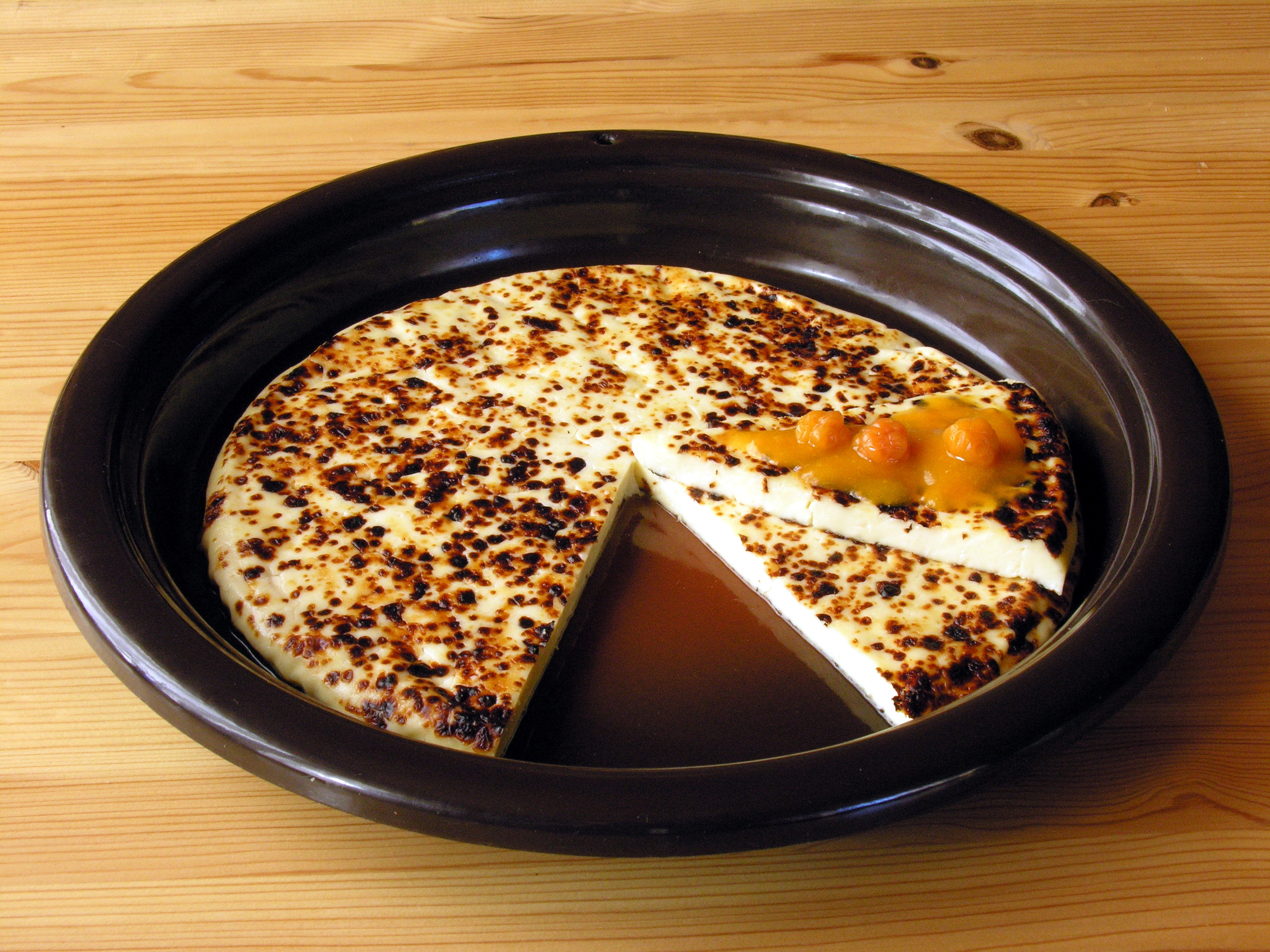
Leipäjuusto with cloudberry jam

Regional and historical sub-tribal identity is generally stronger in South Ostrobothnia than in most regions of Finland.

The South Ostrobothnian dialect belongs to the western Finnish dialects. However, in the most eastern part of the region people speak a Savonian dialect that has Ostrobothnian elements.

One of the biggest rock festivals in Finland, Provinssirock, and the world's oldest tango festival Tangomarkkinat are both held in Seinäjoki. The folk music festival Eteläpohjalaiset Spelit is held annually in different South Ostrobothnian locations and the opera and music festival Ilmajoen Musiikkijuhlat is held in Ilmajoki. Many of the cultural events in South Ostrobothnia are rooted in local folk festivals and communal work.

There are several local folk costumes. Jussipaita is a traditional sweater that has become a symbol for South Ostrobothnian identity.

Notable architecture in South Ostrobothnia include the Lakeuden Risti Church and other buildings in the Aalto Centre in Seinäjoki designed by the South Ostrobothnian-born architect Alvar Aalto. A traditional peasant house, ”pohjalaistalo” (Ostrobothnian house), is a part of the local folk culture.

South Ostrobothnia is known for its agriculture and animal husbandry. Traditional local cuisine include leipäjuusto and kropsu, an Ostrobothnian pancake.

== Municipalities ==
The region of South Ostrobothnia consists of 18 municipalities, eight of which have city status (marked in bold).

=== Municipalities on the map ===
Cities and municipalities of South Ostrobothnia.

=== Sub-regions ===
Järviseutu sub-region

- **Alajärvi**
- Evijärvi
- Lappajärvi
- Soini
- Vimpeli (Vindala)

Kuusiokunnat sub-region

- **Alavus** (Alavo)
- Kuortane
- **Ähtäri** (Etseri)

Seinäjoki sub-region

- Ilmajoki (Ilmola)
- Isokyrö (Storkyro)
- **Kauhava**
- **Kurikka**
- **Lapua** (Lappo)
- **Seinäjoki**

Suupohja sub-region

- Isojoki (Storå)
- Karijoki (Bötom)
- **Kauhajoki**
- Teuva (Östermark)

=== List of municipalities ===
Coat of arms	Municipality	Population	Land area (km^{2})	Density (/km^{2})	Finnish speakers	Swedish speakers	Other speakers
coat of arms of Alajärvi	Alajärvi	8,982	1,009	9	95 %	0.1 %	5 %
Coat of arms of Alavus	Alavus	10,634	1,087	10	97 %	0 %	3 %
coat of arms of Evijärvi	Evijärvi	2,267	354	6	93 %	2.1 %	5 %
coat of arms of Ilmajoki	Ilmajoki	12,405	577	22	98 %	0.2 %	2 %
Coat of arms of Isojoki	Isojoki	1,771	642	3	94 %	0.9 %	5 %
coat of arms of Isokyrö	Isokyrö	4,261	354	12	97 %	0.8 %	2 %
Coat of arms of Karijoki	Karijoki	1,134	186	6	95 %	2.1 %	3 %
coat of arms of Kauhajoki	Kauhajoki	12,429	1,299	10	95 %	0.4 %	4 %
Coat of arms of Kauhava	Kauhava	14,909	1,314	11	93 %	0.7 %	7 %
Coat of arms of Kuortane	Kuortane	3,306	462	7	97 %	0 %	3 %
Coat of arms of Kurikka	Kurikka	19,441	1,725	11	96 %	0.4 %	4 %
coat of arms of Lappajärvi	Lappajärvi	2,704	421	6	92 %	0.5 %	7 %
Coat of arms of Lapua	Lapua	13,927	737	19	95 %	0.2 %	5 %
Coat of arms of Seinäjoki	Seinäjoki	67,283	1,432	47	94 %	0.2 %	6 %
Coat of arms of Soini	Soini	1,772	552	3	98 %	0 %	2 %
coat of arms of Teuva	Teuva	4,574	555	8	96 %	0.7 %	3 %
Coat of arms of Vimpeli	Vimpeli	2,554	287	9	97 %	0 %	3 %
	Total	186,907	13,280	14	95 %	0.3 %	5 %

== Demographics ==
Historical population
Year	Pop.	±% p.a.
1972	200,137	—
1975	196,746	−0.57%
1980	201,152	+0.44%
1985	206,209	+0.50%
1990	207,010	+0.08%
1995	206,136	−0.08%
2000	200,766	−0.53%
2005	198,856	−0.19%
2010	198,469	−0.04%
2015	197,371	−0.11%
2020	192,150	−0.53%
2025	189,474	−0.28%
Source: Statistics Finland

Population size 1990–2025
Year	Population
1990	207,010
1995	206,136
2000	200,766
2005	198,856
2010	198,469
2015	197,371
2020	192,150
2025	189,474

South Ostrobothnia is the most homogenous region in Finland, with the highest share of the population speaking Finnish (97.1%) and the lowest share of people with a foreign-background (2.7%). Swedish is spoken by 637 people (0.3%). The highest shares of Swedish-speakers are in Evijärvi (2%) and Karijoki (1.6%), both of which border majority Swedish-speaking municipalities in the region of Ostrobothnia. The most spoken immigrant languages are Russian (0.5%), Estonian (0.4%), Ukrainian (0.2%), Hungarian (0.2%) and Thai (0.1%).

South Ostrobothnia has the highest proportion of people who belong to the Evangelical Lutheran Church of Finland out of any region, at 82.8%. It also has the fourth highest dependency ratio at 74.3, higher than the national average of 62.4. The region has a higher proportion of people aged 0–14 and those aged 65 and over than the national average. The proportion of people in the working age (aged 15–64) is one of the lowest in the country. Kauhajoki in South Ostrobothnia is estimated to have the highest proportion of Finnish Kale in Finland, at 5%. In 2019, the city of Seinäjoki became one of the first in the country to fly the Romani flag during International Romani Day.

Population by background country as of 31 December 2021:

1. Finland 186,604 (97.31%)
2. Russia 1,026 (0.54%)
3. Estonia 636 (0.33%)
4. Ukraine 291 (0.15%)
5. Hungary 286 (0.15%)
6. Turkey 261 (0.14%)
7. Thailand 254 (0.13%)
8. Sweden 191 (0.10%)
9. Poland 135 (0.07%)
10. Iraq 130 (0.07%)
11. Myanmar 129 (0.07%)
12. Romania 110 (0.06%)

Other 1,709 (0.89%)

== Politics ==
For parliamentary elections, South Ostrobothnia, together with the regions of Ostrobothnia and Central Ostrobothnia, forms the Vaasa constituency. As of 2023, the constituency elects 16 of the 200 members of the Parliament of Finland.

== See also ==
- Ostrobothnians
- South Ostrobothnian dialect
