= History of the Finnish language =

The Finnish language is a Finnic language spoken mostly in Finland that descends from Proto-Finnic and in turn from Proto-Uralic. It is closely related to the Estonian language as well as less-spoken languages, such as Karelian and Veps, and is also distantly related to Hungarian.

The history of the Finnish language can be divided into multiple eras. The earliest phase, Early Finnish (varhaissuomi), lasted from its separation from the other Finnic languages at approximately 700–800 AD until 1540. Around this time, the first Finnish texts of note that survive were written, marking the start of the Old Literary Finnish (vanha kirjasuomi) period. This lasted until the early 19th century, when some time around 1810–1820, the development of the Finnish language entered a new phase called Early Modern Finnish (varhaisnykysuomi). This developed into Modern Finnish (nykysuomi) around the 1870s, by 1880 at the latest.

Timeline of the Finnish language

== Origins ==
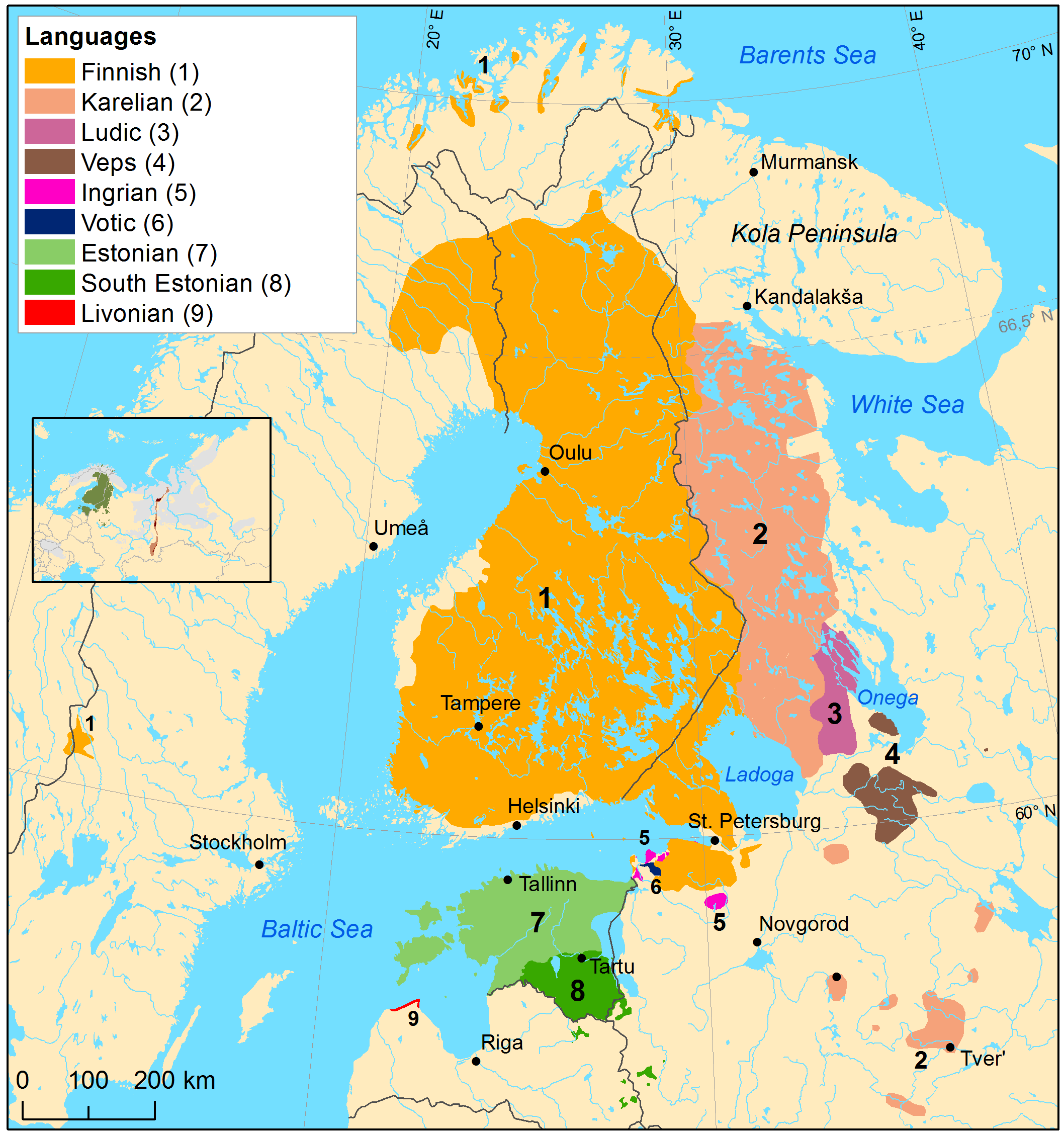
Geographical extent of the Finnic languages in the early 20th century; Finnish shown in orange

Finnish belongs to the Uralic language family and more specifically to the Finnic branch of this family. Thus, Finnish has developed from Proto-Finnic, which in turn has developed from Proto-Uralic. Neither Proto-Uralic nor Proto-Finnic was written down, and what is known of them has been derived through historical linguistics. This includes reconstructions, which are traditionally marked with an asterisk (*).

Finnish is noted for its conservatism. Many of the features reconstructed to Proto-Uralic, such as an agglutinating morphology, vowel harmony, invariably initial (primary) stress, and possessive suffixes, are still present in Finnish today. Consonant gradation in Finnish is also an old feature, shared with some other Finnic languages, the Sámi and certain Samoyedic languages. It has also been proposed to trace back to Proto-Uralic, but this remains a subject of debate. Among the Finnic features that are not found in the other Uralic languages are adjective–noun agreement, the analytic perfect and pluperfect tenses, and possibly the default word order being SVO instead of SOV, although the Finnic word order was likely flexible, as in Finnish today. Finnish is estimated to have inherited over 2,000 words from Proto-Finnic, and the core of Finnish grammar likewise originates from Proto-Finnic.

Proto-Uralic was originally spoken east of the Ural Mountains, but after its dispersal not long before the 2nd millennium BC, Uralic languages had reached as far west as the upper reaches of the rivers Volga and Oka. Slightly after the beginning of the spread of Sámi languages (to southeastern Finland by around 1000 BC and to Central Scandinavia by 200 AD), the Finnic speakers then began to spread along the upper Oka, and the main group reached the northern and western coasts of Estonia around 800 BC. Shortly thereafter, they also reached southwestern and southern Finland. Development of Proto-Finnic into Late Proto-Finnic took place in Northern Estonia and spread across the gulf into southwestern and southern Finland in the Roman Iron Age, marking a second arrival into Finland. The speakers of the earlier Finnic varieties as well as the Sámi-speaking populations that had already settled the same area shifted their language to Late Proto-Finnic. Subsequently, Late Proto-Finnic continued its expansion north of the Gulf of Finland, along the Kokemäenjoki river valley, reaching Tavastia and then east to Karelia by the 8th century AD and Savonia between the 8th and 11th centuries AD. Upon reaching Karelia, Finnic unity began to break down. As they spread, the Finnic speakers assimilated the Sámi-speaking populations living inland, eventually leaving the Sámi languages in what was once their northwestern periphery.

The breakup of the Finnic languages can also be studied linguistically. After South Estonian and Livonian branched off, the remaining core of the Finnic languages then split into Northern Finnic (including Finnish) and Central Finnic (including Estonian). Western Finnish (the western dialects of Finnish) represents a separate node in the tree under Northern Finnic. Eastern Finnish (the eastern dialects), also under Northern Finnic, is more closely related to Karelian and Ingrian; they share a common proto-language, known in literature as Proto-Karelian (muinaiskarjala). Therefore, Finnish has effectively developed from two different (albeit closely related) languages melding into one.

=== Inherited vocabulary ===
Estimates put the number of Finnish words inherited from Proto-Uralic at around 300–400; despite their small number, they make up approximately 70–80 percent of average speech.

Inherited words include nouns related to relatives, body parts, nature, and kinship terms, as well as many basic verbs, adpositional stems, the low numerals, and most pronouns. Some conclusions regarding the Proto-Uralic lexicon can be drawn: no terms for social organization or agriculture are known, and the only known metalworking term may be a later Wanderwort that spread after the disintegration of the protolanguage.

Examples of native Uralic words in Finnish
Finnish	Gloss	Proto-Uralic	Reference
ala-	"below, under"	*i̮la-	
appi	"father-in-law"	*i̮ppi	
elää	"to live"	*elä-	
hiiri	"mouse"	*šiŋir(i)	
jousi	"bow (weapon)"	*ji̮ŋsi / *joŋsi	
juoda	"to drink"	*ji̮xi- / *juxi-	
jää	"ice"	*jäŋi	
kala	"fish"	*kala	
kieli	"tongue"	*käli	
kivi	"stone, rock"	*kiwi	
kurki	"crane (bird)"	*kurki / *ki̮rki	
kuulla	"to hear"	*kuwli-	
käsi	"hand, arm"	*käti	
maa	"ground, earth"	*mi̮xi	
mennä	"to go"	*meni-	
muna	"egg"	*muna	
nimi	"name"	*nimi	
pata	"clay pot"	*pata	
pato	"dam, weir"	*pado / *padiw	
päivä	"day"	*päjwä	
pää	"head"	*peŋä	
setä	"(paternal) uncle"	*čečä	
silmä	"eye"	*śilmä	
suksi	"ski"	*suksi	
särki	"roach (fish)"	*särki	
taka-	"behind"	*taka-	
talvi	"winter"	*tälwä	
tuli	"fire"	*tuli	
tulla	"to come"	*tuli-	
tuntea	"to know well"	*tumti-	
tuomi	"bird cherry"	*ďi̮mi	
täi	"louse"	*täji	
veri	"blood"	*weri	
vesi	"water"	*weti	
vuosi	"year"	*i̮di	
Note: Uralonet references connect a Finnish word to a Uralic word family, whereas Aikio (2022) provides up-to-date reconstructions.

=== Loanwords ===
The oldest loanwords in Finnish were already present in Proto-Uralic, which borrowed words from Indo-Iranian languages. Proto-Finnic has many loanwords from the Baltic (over 250 words), Germanic (over 500) and Slavic languages (perhaps over 100). After Proto-Finnic, Finnish has borrowed extensively from Swedish, accounting for about a half of all loanwords in the language. Furthermore, many words were also borrowed from Middle Low German, even without Swedish mediation. More recently, English has become the most important source of new loanwords, as it has in the rest of the Western world.

In a 2018 article, linguist Kaisa Häkkinen estimated that out of the vocabulary present in a learner's dictionary, 49 percent of words were native, 46 percent were loanwords, and the remaining five percent had a disputed etymology. Out of the native vocabulary, 45 percent were older than Proto-Finnic, 52 percent were from the Proto-Finnic era, and the remaining 3 percent from after Proto-Finnic.

The loanwords in Finnish span multiple semantic fields. Old Baltic and Germanic borrowings encompass agriculture, nature, social life, and basic actions and technology. Earlier Baltic borrowings reflect a more primitive form of agriculture, whereas Germanic includes terms for clearing and enclosing fields. Germanic borrowings also suggest a culture acquainted with bronzeworking, seafaring and more advanced social structures, which are themes mostly or entirely absent from Baltic loanword layers. Early Slavic borrowings include some fundamental terms related to Christianity. Swedish influence stretches back to the Viking Age. Loanwords from Swedish include words related to the church, school, economics, society, clothing, architecture, cuisine, gardening, tools, materials, seafaring, fishing, occupations, and even kinship. This influence extends beyond vocabulary to phonology, grammar and syntax.

Finnish also has some loanwords from the Sámi languages, such as kahlata 'to wade', kenttä 'open field' and väylä 'waterway, passage'. In addition, some Finnish terms have been traced back to unknown substrate languages, such as ahven 'perch (fish)', niemi 'peninsula' and saari 'island'. Several toponyms in Finland, such as Imatra, Päijänne and Saimaa, have also been traced to unknown substrates.

Sources of loanwords in common vocabulary according to Häkkinen (2018)
1. Indo-European and Indo-Iranian loans (12%)
2. Old Germanic loans (39%)
3. Swedish and German (including Low German) loans (17%)
4. Baltic loans (12%)
5. Slavic loans (5%)
6. Internationalisms (15%)

==== Examples of loanwords ====
Loanwords in Finnish, both old and new, include:

Examples of Indo-Iranian loanwords in Finnish
Finnish	Gloss	Comparandum
ahnas, ahne	"greedy"	Sanskrit अश्न aśna
arvo	"value"	Ossetian аргъ arǧ
jumala	"god"	Sanskrit द्युमत् dyumát
kanto	"tree stump"	Sanskrit स्क॒न्ध skandhá
kehrä	"spindle"	Sanskrit चात्त्र cāttra
mehiläinen	"bee"	Sanskrit मक्षि॑का mákṣikā
ohra	"barley"	Sanskrit अश्रि aśri
orja	"slave"	Sanskrit आर्य ā́rya
perna	"spleen"	Avestan 𐬯𐬞𐬆𐬭𐬆𐬰𐬀𐬥 spərəzan
piimä	"cultured buttermilk"	Avestan 𐬞𐬀𐬉𐬨𐬀𐬥 paēman
repo	"fox"	Persian روباه rōbāh
sarvi	"horn"	Avestan 𐬯𐬭𐬎𐬎𐬁 sruuā
sata	"hundred"	Sanskrit शत śatá
taivas	"sky, heaven"	Sanskrit दे॒व devá
vasara	"hammer"	Sanskrit वज्र vájra
viha	"hatred, anger"	Sanskrit वि॒ष viṣá

Examples of Baltic loanwords in Finnish
Finnish	Gloss	Comparandum
ahdas	"tight"	Lithuanian añkštas
ansa	"trap"	Lithuanian ąsà
hammas	"tooth"	Lithuanian žambas
heimo	"tribe"	Lithuanian šeima
kaikki	"all"	Lithuanian kiek
kaula	"neck"	Latvian kakls
kelta	"yellow"	Lithuanian gelta
kirves	"axe"	Latvian cirvis
lohi	"salmon"	Latvian lasis
metsä	"forest"	Latvian mežs
morsian	"bride"	Lithuanian martì
seinä	"wall"	Lithuanian siena
silta	"bridge"	Latvian tilts
sisar	"sister"	Lithuanian sesuo
tarha	"garden"	Lithuanian daržas
tuore	"fresh"	Lithuanian doras
tytär	"daughter"	Lithuanian duktė
villa	"wool"	Latvian vilna
vuohi	"goat"	Latvian āzis

Examples of Germanic loanwords in Finnish
Finnish	Gloss	Comparandum
ahjo	"furnace"	Swedish ässja
airo	"oar"	Old Norse ár
armas	"dear"	Old Norse armr
aura	"plough"	Old Norse arðr
hauta	"grave"	Old English seaþ
ja	"and"	Gothic 𐌾𐌰𐌷 jah
kansa	"people"	Gothic 𐌷𐌰𐌽𐍃𐌰 hansa
kaunis	"beautiful"	Gothic 𐍃𐌺𐌰𐌿𐌽𐍃 skauns
kauppa	"trade; a shop"	Old Norse kaupa
keihäs	"spear"	Old Norse geirr
kulta	"gold"	Old Norse gull
kuningas	"king"	Old English cyning
käydä	"to go, walk"	Gothic 𐍃𐌺𐌴𐍅𐌾𐌰𐌽 skēwjan
laiva	"ship"	Old Norse fley
lammas	"sheep"	Old Norse lamb
leipä	"bread"	Old Norse hleifr
miekka	"sword"	Old Norse mækir
pelto	"(grain) field"	Old English feld
raha	"money"	Old Norse skrá
rengas	"hoop, ring"	Old Norse hringr
rikas	"rich"	Old Norse ríkr
ruis	"rye"	Old Norse rugr
sairas	"sick, ill"	Old Norse sárr
tauti	"disease"	Old Norse dauði
turve	"peat"	Old Norse torf
valta	"power, might"	Icelandic vald
äiti	"mother"	Gothic 𐌰𐌹𐌸𐌴𐌹 aiþei

Examples of Slavic loanwords in Finnish
Finnish	Gloss	Comparandum
lusikka	"spoon"	Old East Slavic лъжька lŭžĭka
pakana	"pagan"	Old East Slavic поганъ poganŭ
pappi	"priest"	Russian поп pop
risti	"cross"	Old East Slavic крьстъ krĭstŭ

Examples of Middle Low German loanwords in Finnish
Finnish	Gloss	Source
ammatti	"occupation, profession"	Middle Low German ambacht
häät	"wedding"	Middle Low German hȫge
kirkko	"church"	Middle Low German kirke
rehti	"honest"	Middle Low German recht
rouva	"madam, lady"	Middle Low German vrouwe

Examples of Swedish loanwords in Finnish
Finnish	Gloss	Source
enkeli	"angel"	Swedish ängel
housut	"trousers"	Swedish hosa
kahvi	"coffee"	Swedish kaffe
katu	"street"	Swedish gata
kokki	"cook"	Swedish kock
koulu	"school"	Swedish skola
köli	"keel"	Swedish köl
laki	"law"	Swedish lag
lyijy	"lead (metal)"	Swedish bly
lääkäri	"doctor, physician"	Swedish läkare
masto	"mast"	Swedish mast
mylly	"mill"	Swedish mylla
pankki	"bank"	Swedish bank
peili	"mirror"	Swedish spegel
portti	"gate"	Swedish port
rappu	"stair(s)"	Swedish trappa
rippi	"(Christian) confession"	Swedish skrift
sakset	"scissors"	Swedish sax
sielu	"soul"	Swedish själ
synti	"sin"	Swedish synd
tuoli	"chair"	Swedish stol
tuomari	"judge"	Swedish domare
tyyny	"pillow"	Swedish dyna
uuni	"oven"	Swedish ugn
vihkiä	"to consecrate"	Swedish viga
yrtti	"herb"	Swedish ört

== Early Finnish ==
Early Finnish represents the earliest period of the Finnish language as separate from the other Finnic languages. Its start date is placed around 700 AD. Some sources distinguish between Early and Medieval Finnish, with a crossover point around 1200. By 1000 AD, there were four well-defined dialect regions: Southwest Finland, Tavastia, Karelia and Savonia. These belonged to two diachronically distinct language groups of Western and Eastern Finnish. Southwest Finland and Tavastia belonged to Western Finnish, while Savonia and Karelia belonged to Eastern Finnish. Early (and Medieval) Finnish covers the western dialects, while the eastern dialects instead developed as part of Proto-Karelian during this time.

For reference, today, there are seven dialectal groups: the Southwest Finnish dialects, the Tavastian dialects, the South Ostrobothnian dialect, the Central and North Ostrobothnian dialects, the Peräpohjola dialects, the Savonian dialects, and the South Karelian dialects; the first five comprise the western dialects, and the last two the eastern dialects. The South Ostrobothnian dialect likely developed between the 9th and 12th centuries. The more northern dialects (the Central and North Ostrobothnian dialects and the Peräpohjola dialects) tend to display a mix of western and eastern features due to Karelian influence.

Written attestations of Early Finnish are scant, mostly consisting of individual names of both people and locations since at least the 13th century. Even such fragmentary records are useful to understand the history of Early Finnish and can be used to help establish approximate dates for certain sound changes.

Western Finnish dialects began to be clearly distinct in the Late Middle Ages, yet remained relatively uniform due to high mobility until the 16th century. According to Kallio (2017), the southwestern dialects in the core were the most innovative, whereas the peripheral Ostrobothnian dialects were the most conservative. The Tavastian dialects, occupying an intermediate position, are defined by being Western Finnish in origin, yet neither southwestern nor Ostrobothnian, and thus are more of an areal than a phylogenetic grouping.

=== Status of medieval Finnish ===
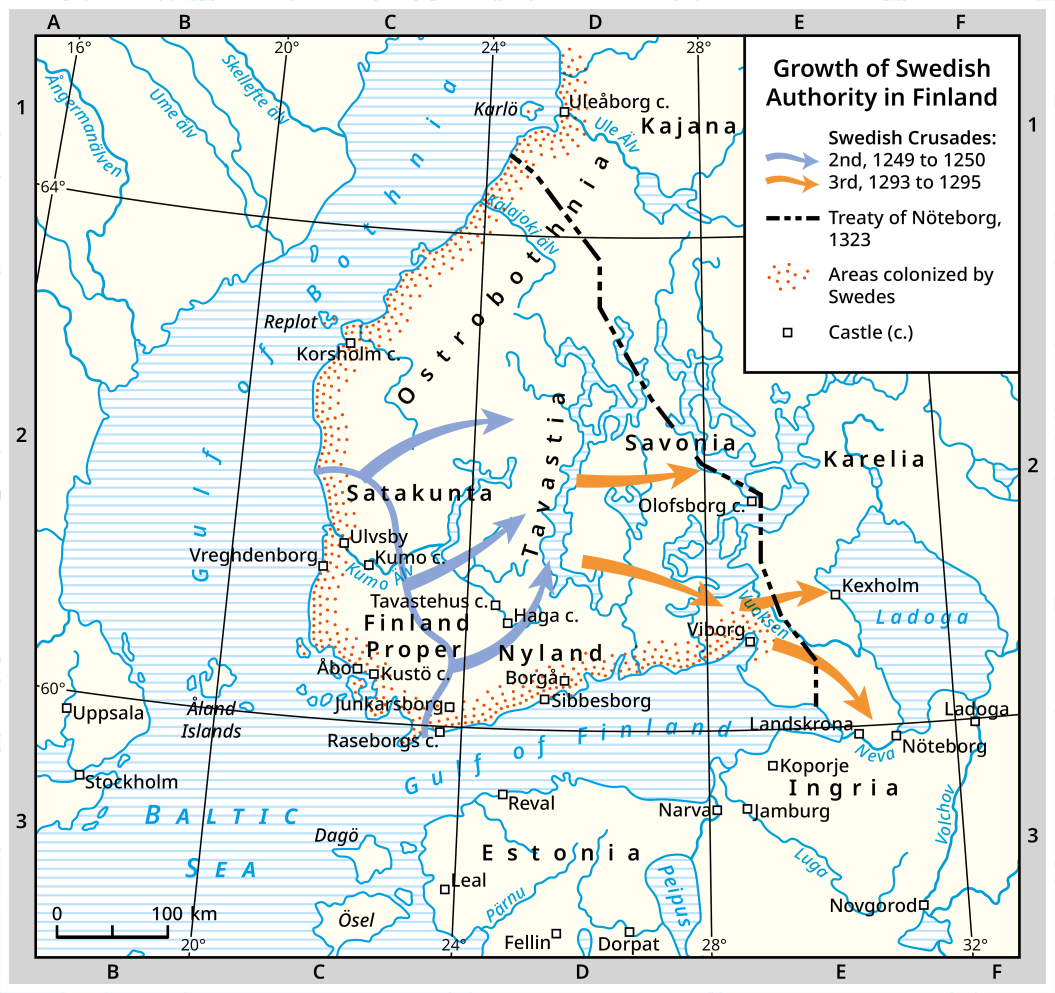
Swedish eastern expansion in Finland, 1249–1323

Beginning in the 12th century, the Swedish colonisation of Finland represented a decisive demographic shift. The main motive for this colonisation was the spread of Christianity. While evidence in the form of loanwords suggests that attempts to spread Christianity into Finland also originated from Slavs in the east (e.g. pappi, risti), Swedish proselytism proved more effective. The Christianization and Swedish conquest—part of the Crusades—first consolidated in Southwest Finland and Satakunta before spreading to Tavastia, Uusimaa and Ostrobothnia. Swedish rule in Finland was first formalised by the 1323 Treaty of Nöteborg. During Swedish rule, Swedish was the language of administration, while Latin was used in the church (until the Reformation). Finnish was merely the language of the common people. No unified or literary Finnish language existed at this time, and the language was used exclusively in an oral form. The term Finland (Suomi) referred initially to Southwest Finland, but would later come to be used more broadly, as it—and the city of Turku in particular—was the centre of both spiritual and secular administration.

The Treaty of Nöteborg also marked the final breakup of Proto-Karelian, as the border between Sweden and Novgorod became not only a boundary between realms but also a cultural and religious divide. The dialect spoken on the Novgorodian side, Kexholm Karelian, developed into the Karelian language. In the north, the Proto-Karelian variety combined with western (likely Tavastian) admixture and developed into the Savonian dialects around Savilahti (modern Mikkeli). In the west, Proto-Karelian varieties fell under the Swedish sphere of influence. These varieties began to be influenced by Western Finnish and developed into the southeastern dialects, which acquired their eventual form in the Vyborg Governorate. The 1617 Treaty of Stolbovo would later alter the balance between Finnish and Karelian.

Written attestations of Finnish prior to the 16th century are scarce. The earliest known text in any Finnic language is the Birch bark letter no. 292 from the early 13th century, but this letter is written in a language closer to modern Karelian or Veps than to Finnish. The earliest known full sentence in Finnish specifically is dated to around 1470 and appears in a travel journal primarily written in German: Mÿnna thachton gernaſt ſpuho ſom̅en gelen Emyna daÿda. These words are ascribed to the Bishop of Turku at the time. The Bishopric of Turku began to use Finnish in church services in 1492, when it was decreed that at least the Lord's Prayer, Hail Mary and the creed had to be written down and read to the people in their own language. None such texts have survived.

== Old Literary Finnish ==
=== Mikael Agricola ===
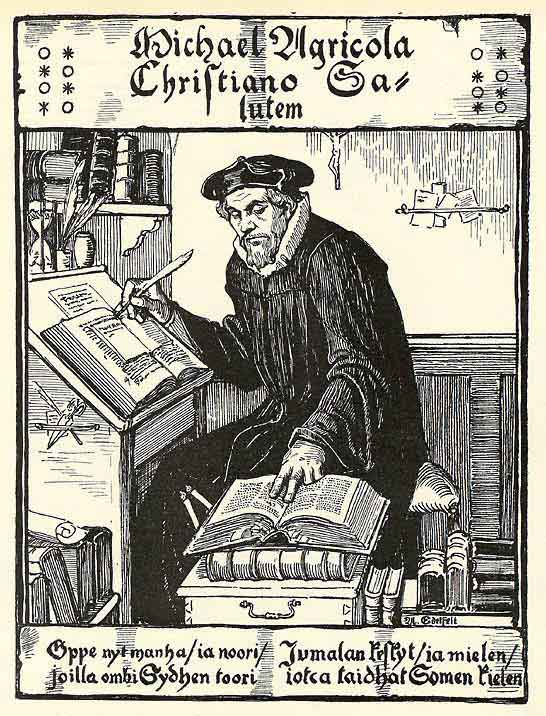
Albert Edelfelt's impression of Mikael Agricola

The period of Old Literary Finnish begins with the first known books to be printed in Finnish. They were written by Mikael Agricola, often referred to as the "father of Literary Finnish". Agricola was a clergyman and a fluent speaker of both Swedish and Finnish. Under the Reformation period, both of the leading figures, Erasmus and Martin Luther, stressed that the word of God be accessible to the common people in their own language. After Luther's German translation of the Bible, Agricola set out to translate the Bible into Finnish.

Besides Agricola, other manuscripts in Finnish from the same period are known, some of which may predate Agricola's first published work. A Finnish extract of the Uppsala Gospel Book is estimated to date from the late 1530s. Other manuscripts from this period include the Uppsala Agenda and the Codex Westh.

The first book written by Agricola was a primer called Abckiria, published in 1543. Today, it exists in complete form as a composite from multiple different editions. The poem on the first page of Abckiria remains an enduring piece of Finnish literature even today:

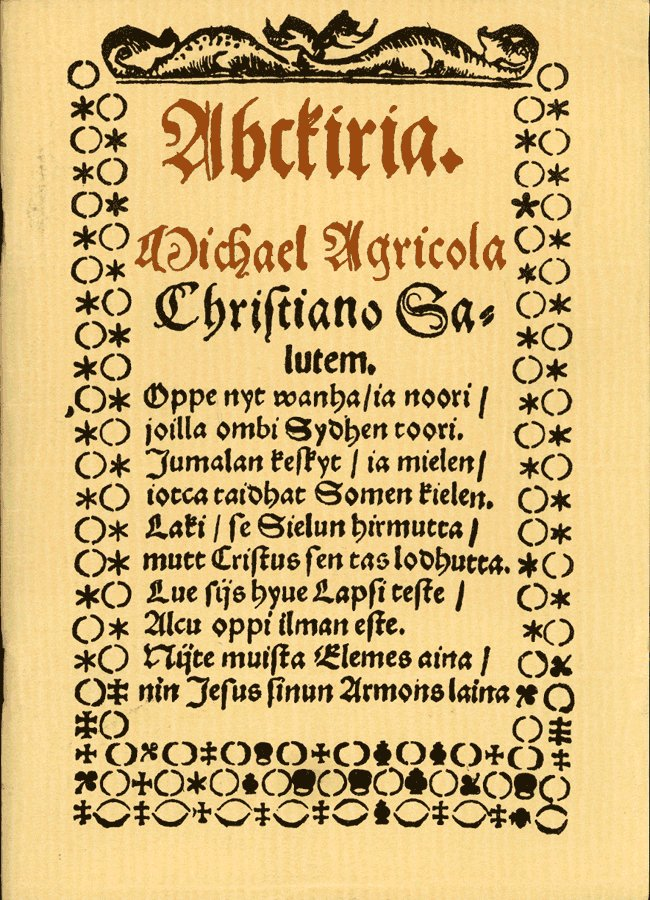
Front page of Abckiria

Oppe nyt wanha, ia noori /
joilla ombi Sydhen toori /
Jumalan keſkyt / ia mielen
iotca taidhat Somen kielen.
Laki / ſe Sielun hirmutta /
mutt Criſtus ſen tas lodhutta.
Lue ſijs hyue Lapſi teſte /
Alcu oppi ilman eſte.
Nijte muiſta Elemes aina /
nin Jeſus ſinun Armons laina

Learn now, old and young,
those who have a heart fresh,
God's commandments and mind,
which you will know with the Finnish language.
Law, it frightens the soul,
but Christ soothes it again.
So read from here good child,
the basics without obstacle.
Remember them all your life,
and Jesus will grant you his mercy.

Agricola completed translating the New Testament in 1548 but never fully translated the Old Testament due to a lack of funding. He wrote in a southwestern dialect of Finnish, as Turku was effectively the capital of Finland at the time. However, his texts also displayed features from other dialects, as Agricola himself also acknowledged. Furthermore, Agricola also incorporated various foreign features in Old Literary Finnish, deriving mainly from Swedish, but also from German and Latin. These include compound verbs, articles, the use of personal pronouns in a reflexive sense, and a passive structure like that of the Germanic languages; these are rare or even absent in modern Standard Finnish. Approximately 60 percent of the vocabulary used by Agricola remain in use today.

The orthography found in Agricola's works is different in many ways from that of modern Finnish. He modelled Finnish spelling after Swedish, German and Latin. Spellings were much less consistent: the same sound could be spelled in multiple ways depending on the context, and the same letter could denote different sounds. For example, the vowel /æ/ could be spelled as ä or e, and the consonant /k/ could be spelled as k, c or q depending on the following vowel. /ð/ (found in southwestern dialects at the time) was spelled as d or dh, /ɣ/ (unstable and seemingly disappearing) as g, gh, ghi, ghw, and /θθ/ as tz.

The grammar of Old Literary Finnish differed from that of modern Finnish. Consonant-stem forms for both nominals and verbs were more common (such as autuassa for modern autuaana, coollunna for modern kuolleena, kääten for modern kääntäen, rakennut for modern rakentanut). The third-person plural ending for the indicative past and conditional forms was simply -t (e.g. tulit for modern tulivat). There were passive forms of the first infinitive (e.g. pidheldä, modern spelling pideltää), corresponding to forms in other Germanic languages, with no exact equivalent in modern Finnish.

=== After Agricola ===
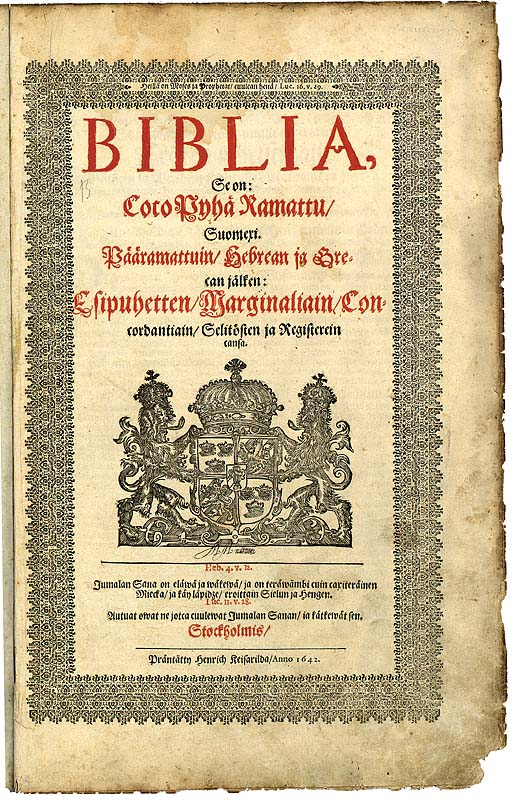
The title leaf of Biblia, Se on: Coco Pyhä Ramattu, Suomexi, the first complete Finnish translation of the Bible.

Agricola's writings remained highly influential for almost a century. The first complete translation of the Bible into Finnish was finished in 1642. This translation sought to eliminate some of the loanwords used by Agricola and to use fewer foreign sentence structures, showing a puristic tendency. Nevertheless, Swedish and German influence was still apparent in at least the syntax. Calques and foreign sentence structures remained common throughout the Old Literary Finnish period, as most texts were translations, usually from Swedish or Latin.

Spelling became more regular in the century following Agricola. Vowels and vowel length began to be marked more consistently, q ceased to be used (but c and k were still used), /ð/ came to be denoted by d, and /ɣ/ by g. These norms set by the 1642 Bible translation were largely followed by subsequent texts. However, the spelling of sounds remained somewhat inconsistent until the late 19th century.

Old Literary Finnish remained based on the southwestern dialects (specifically the variety spoken in Turku). The language in the 1642 Bible translation was even more based on southwestern Finnish than Agricola's texts had been. In general, writers imitated literary forms rather than their own personal dialects, although they occasionally resorted to the latter when the literary language lacked an equivalent expression. Features that differ from modern Standard Finnish include the inessive ending -s or -sa (modern standard -ssa), frequent apocope (e.g. punaist for modern punaista, ylistem for modern ylistämme), the adjectival ending -ia (modern -ea, e.g. hopia for modern hopea), and the weak grade before diphthongs ending in i (e.g. kullainen for modern kultainen). All of these features are still found in dialects today. In the late 17th century, Tavastian and Ostrobothnian dialects began influencing Old Literary Finnish; as the latter had elements of the eastern dialects, these too began to indirectly shape the literary Finnish language for the first time.

Historical events continued shaping the development of Finnish dialects. After Sweden got control of Kexholm County in the 1617 Treaty of Stolbovo, Finnish speakers spread and replaced the Karelian language in most of the region, as most of the Eastern Orthodox Karelians fled to Russia. This included North Karelia, which was settled mainly by Savonians, with the original Karelians remaining only in a few villages. Ingria also saw an influx of Finnish speakers (see § Finnish abroad). Finnish also continued spreading north: Kainuu was reached by the 16th century, and Kainuu Sámi went extinct in the 18th century.

The late period of Swedish rule in Finland was a relatively quiet period of development; Finnish-language literature published during this era was predominantly religious. In the 18th century, Finnish did not enjoy much prestige; Henrik Gabriel Porthan wrote that earlier in the 18th century, the clergy, gentry and townspeople had regularly used Finnish, but that this was actively changing "without any duress". Many in the gentry preferred Swedish in order to associate themselves with the bourgeoning cultural life in Sweden. The Russian occupation (e.g. the Great Wrath) also contributed, as most of the educated population fled to Sweden. Education in Swedish was supported and encouraged.

In 1749, the Finnish population numbered 410,400. Under Swedish rule, approximately 85% of the population was monolingual in Finnish, approximately 10% was monolingual in Swedish, and the remainder was multilingual.

=== Old Literary Finnish texts ===
An excerpt from Suomalaisen Sana-Lugun Coetus

Most Old Literary Finnish texts were religious in nature, though legal and secular texts also existed. Parts of the Swedish legal code were likely already interpreted into Finnish during the Middle Ages, but the first known legal or administrative text in Finnish is a translation of Gustav Vasa's 1555 edict, in which the king ordered the Finnish people to prepare for a Russian attack. Only a few such texts in Finnish are known from the 16th century, whereas hundreds are known from the 17th and 18th centuries. The Finnish translation of Kristofers landslag, dated to the 1580s, is the first known translation of a body of law into Finnish. The 18th century marked the beginning of proper Finnish-language secular literature.

Noteworthy works include Henrik Florinus' collection of Finnish proverbs, the first of its kind. In addition, the first dictionary including Finnish words by Ericus Schroderus was published in 1637, and the first grammar of Finnish (written in Latin) was published in 1649; an earlier grammar was likely published in 1640 but has been lost. 18th-century publications include a Finnish translation of the laws of Sweden (finished in 1734 but published only in 1759) and the first scientific work written in Finnish (by Johan Abrahaminpoika Frosterus) in 1791. Daniel Juslenius compiled the first comprehensive Finnish dictionary, Suomalaisen Sana-Lugun Coetus, published in 1745. In its foreword, Juslenius stated that he wrote the dictionary to introduce the Finnish language to foreigners and to demonstrate that the language and its speakers were just as valuable as any other.

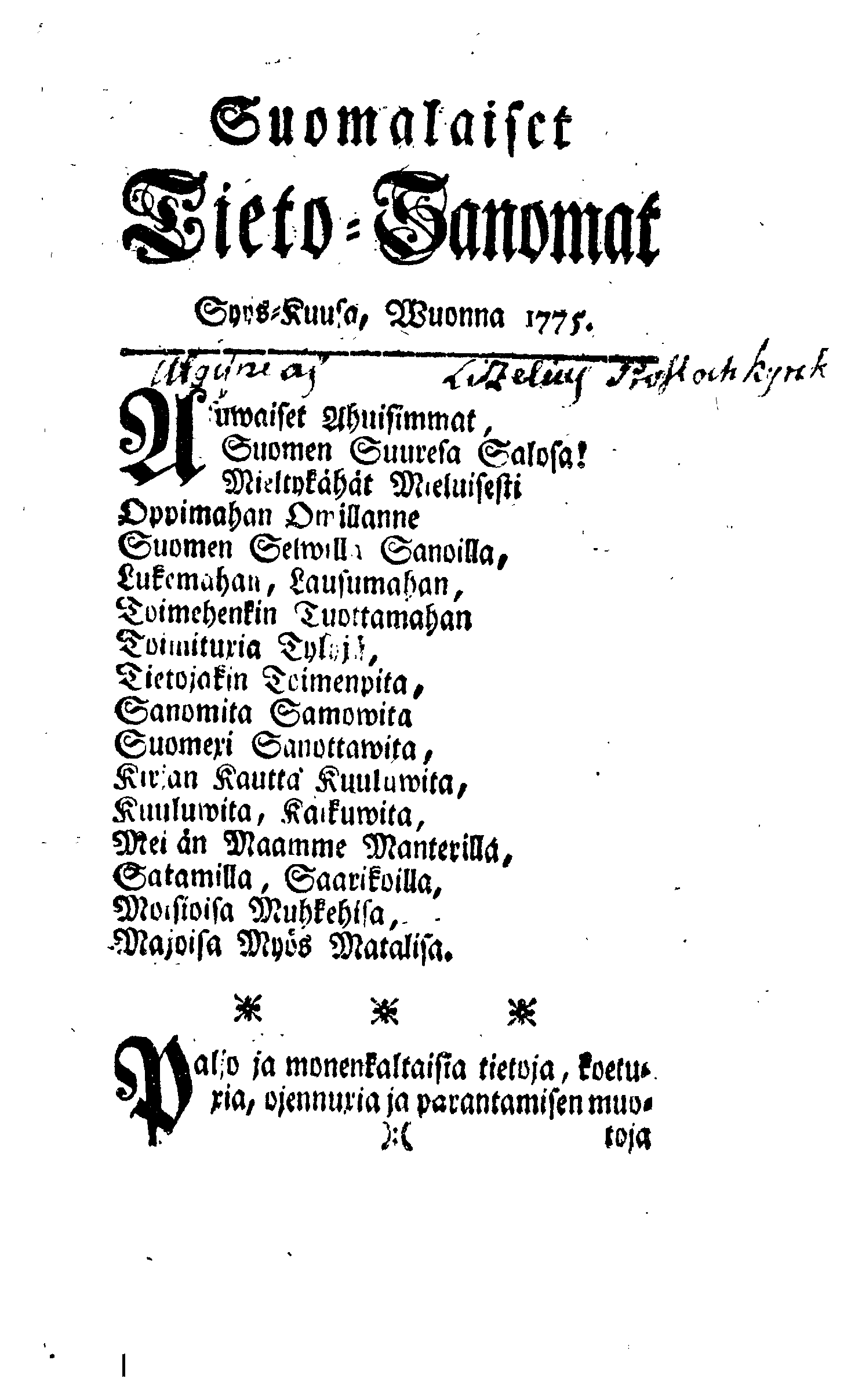
September 1775 issue of Suomenkieliset Tieto-Sanomat

The 1776 Bible translation, an updated version of the 1642 translation edited by Antti Lizelius, reformed spelling by eliminating c and standardizing on k. Lizelius also started the first Finnish-language serial publication, Suomenkieliset Tieto-Sanomat, although it did not last for long. He also coined many new words, such as tapahtuma "event" and vuosituhat "millennium".

Finnish was predominantly written in blackletter, more specifically Fraktur, until the early 20th century. This practice was so common that Finnish text could even be typeset in Fraktur to set it apart from text in other languages (such as Swedish) typed in Antiqua, even within the same sentence. Texts aimed at educated readers transitioned to Roman type (Antiqua) earlier than those intended for the general public. The letter W was also replaced with the "Latin" V during this transition.

=== Comparison ===
The following excerpts illustrate the evolution of written Finnish from the Agricolan period to the Modern Finnish period through translations of Luke 10:18–19:

Se Wsi Testamenti (1548)
Nin ſanoi hen heille/ Mine nein Sathanan Taiuahaſt langeuan ninquin Pitkeſen leimauxen. Catzo/ Mine annan teille woiman tallata kaͤrmetten ia Scorpionin paͤle/ ia kaiken Wiholiſen waͤen paͤle/ ia ei miten teille wahingoita.
Biblia, se on Coco Pyhä Ramattu Suomexi (1642)
Nijn haͤn ſanoi heille: minaͤ naͤin Sathanin Taiwaſt langewan nijncuin pitkaͤiſen leimauxen. Cadzo/ minaͤ annan teille woiman tallata kaͤrmet ja Scorpionit/ ja caicke wiholliſen waͤke/ ja ei teille mikaͤn ole wahingoidzewa.
Biblia, se on koko Pyhä Raamattu suomexi (1776)
Niin haͤn ſanoi heille: minaͤ naͤin Satanan Taiwaſta langewan niinkuin pitkaͤiſen tulen. Katzo, minaͤ annan teille wallan tallata kaͤrmeitaͤ ja Skorpioneita ja kaikke wiholliſen woimaa, ja ei teitaͤ mikaͤn ole wahingoitzewa.
1776 translation with modernized spelling
Niin hän sanoi heille: minä näin Saatanan Taivaasta lankeevan niinkuin pitkäisen tulen. Katso, minä annan teille vallan tallata käärmeitä ja Skorpioneita ja kaikkea vihollisen voimaa, ja ei teitä mikään ole vahingoitseva.
Raamattu (1933/1938)
Silloin hän sanoi heille: "Minä näin saatanan lankeavan taivaasta niinkuin salaman. Katso, minä olen antanut teille vallan tallata käärmeitä ja skorpioneja ja kaikkea vihollisen voimaa, eikä mikään ole teitä vahingoittava.

== Early Modern Finnish ==
After Finland was conquered from Sweden by Russia in 1809, views regarding the Finnish language gradually began to change significantly, and the development of the Finnish language accelerated considerably during the Early Modern Finnish period.

The founding of the Finnish Literature Society in 1831 was one of the key moments during this period. The organization was founded to promote literature written in Finnish and the academic study of the language. Elias Lönnrot, its first secretary, would go on to edit the Finnish national epic Kalevala, which would prove very influential in the development of a Finnish national identity.

=== Battle of dialects and sound changes ===
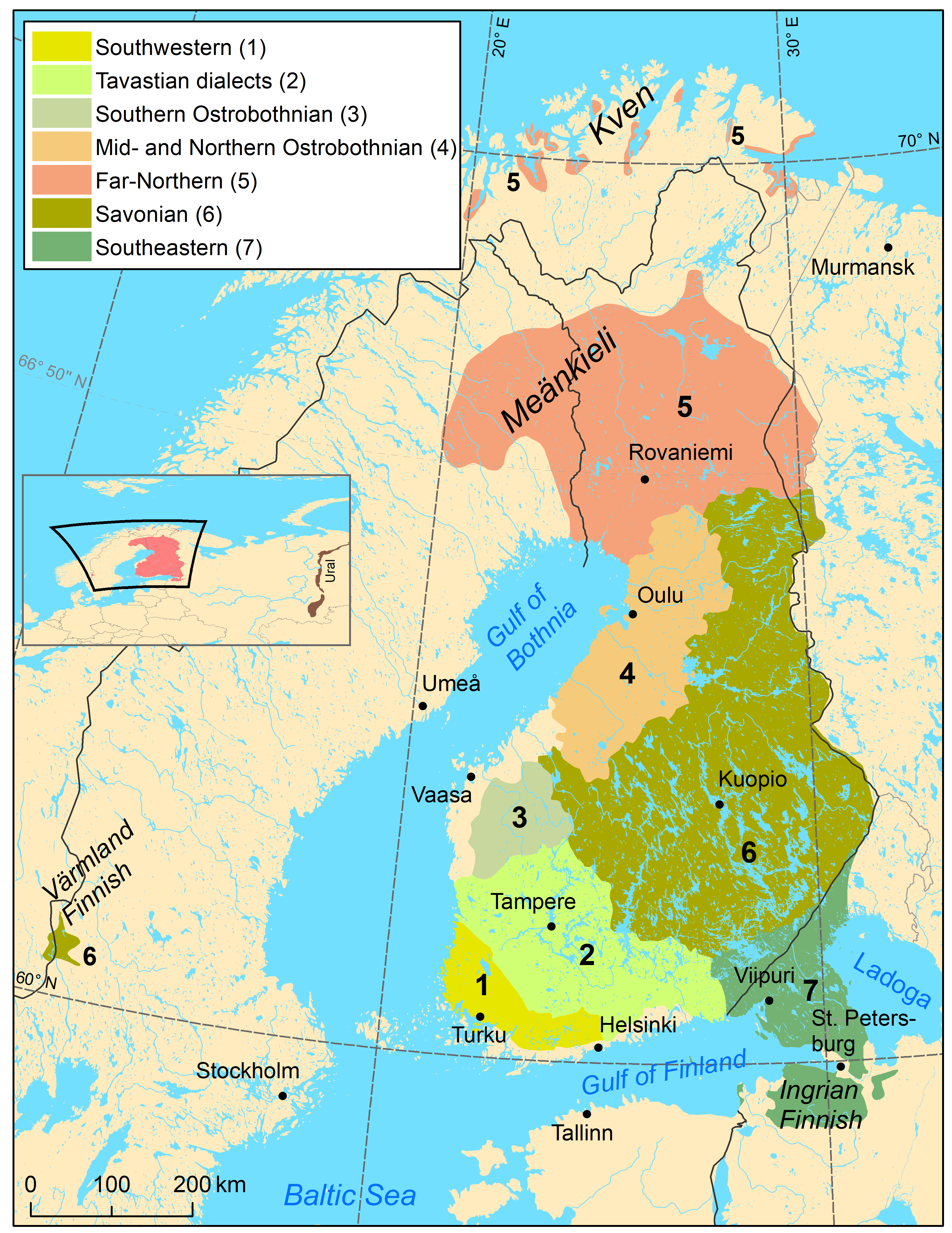
A map of the traditional Finnish dialects. Western Finnish represents dialect regions 1–5 and Eastern Finnish regions 6–7.

Old Literary Finnish was based practically entirely on Western Finnish, particularly on the southwestern Finnish dialects. This began to be questioned in the early 19th century in what is now often termed the "battle of dialects" (murteiden taistelu). In 1820, Reinhold von Becker published an article in Turun Wiikko-Sanomat, in which he argued that Eastern Finnish represented a better language than Western Finnish did. Despite this, Becker did not seek to have Western Finnish replaced entirely but to enrich the Finnish language with eastern elements. When he released a Finnish grammar in 1824, he treated the Savonian dialects as the 'reference dialect' and portrayed some Savonian features as those of the standard language itself. Carl Axel Gottlund went even further, liberally using the Savonian dialect in his writings, despite a lack of proficiency in Savonian and in Finnish in general. Some have even claimed that Gottlund sought to replace Old Literary Finnish entirely with a new Finnish based on Savonian dialects, even though he himself wrote that he did not necessarily want to set an example for others to follow.

Ultimately, the western dialects remained the foundation after authors came out in support of Old Literary Finnish. This included Gustaf Renvall, who argued for maintaining Western Finnish as the basis for Standard Finnish. He also sought to weed out foreign (primarily Swedish and German) elements from it while accepting only some Eastern Finnish traits, mostly vocabulary but also some grammatical features. A major influence in the adoption of eastern features was Elias Lönnrot, who had originally believed that standard Finnish should be based on the eastern dialects. He later came to believe that it should instead be a blend of different dialects. As the editor of Kalevala, Lönnrot held considerable sway, and his position prevailed. Consequently, modern Standard Finnish is rather evenly based on both western and eastern features. At the time, Eastern Finnish was also widely understood to include Karelian and Ingrian; a large part of the source material for Kalevala was gathered from regions speaking either of these two. Therefore, they also influenced the development of Standard Finnish during this period.

Among the eastern features adopted into standard Finnish during the Early Modern Finnish period were the inessive ending -ssa/-ssä, accusative forms of personal pronouns ending in -t (e.g. minut) and the non-use of instructive forms of the third infinitive (pitää tekemän > pitää tehdä). Eastern vocabulary was also adopted into Standard Finnish; some words even replaced their Western Finnish counterparts, such as ehtoo > ilta "evening", nisu > vehnä "wheat", and suvi > kesä "summer". In addition, the third-person plural verb ending -vat/-vät replaced the earlier -t, the third-person possessive suffix -Vn (alongside the western -nsa/-nsä, mostly found as -ns in Old Literary Finnish) was adopted, and word-initial consonant clusters—absent in Eastern Finnish even in loanwords—were simplified in many words.

One of the important dialectal differences was the treatment of /ð/, /θθ/ and /ɣ/. Most Finnish dialects had lost these phonemes (/ɣ/ was probably lost everywhere by this point), but the result varied by dialect:

- /ð/ had been spelled as d since the Old Literary Finnish period. In most of the western dialects, it had become either /r/ or /l/, depending on the dialect. In Eastern Finnish (and most Ostrobothnian dialects), the corresponding *-d- was lost entirely (in fact, lost already in Proto-Karelian; but cases like *saada > saaha ~ soaha ~ suaha). Proponents of Eastern Finnish often supported getting rid of d from Standard Finnish entirely, but it ultimately remained; however, some words in Standard Finnish (such as lähettää and viehättää) follow the Eastern Finnish pattern. d came to be pronounced as a voiced plosive /d/ in Standard Finnish. This is often explained as foreign influence, deriving from a spelling pronunciation based on its pronunciation in Swedish.
- /θθ/ (spelled tz in Old Literary Finnish) had usually become /tt/ in Western Finnish, while in Eastern Finnish, *cc had evolved into /ht/, /ss/ or /ts/, depending on the dialect. Eventually, /ts/ became the standard pronunciation; this may be for a similar reason as above for /d/ (i.e., spelling pronunciation by Swedish speakers), but /ts/ was also found in dialects spoken on the Karelian Isthmus.
- /ɣ/ (spelled g in Old Literary Finnish) had been lost (it had already been unstable during Agricola's time), but in Western Finnish, the result was often a glide (kulɣen > kuljen, raɣot > ravot, ulɣos > ulvos), while in Eastern Finnish, the corresponding *-g- was lost entirely (had been lost already in Proto-Karelian; kulɣen > kulen, raɣot > raot, ulɣos > ulos). In this case, Standard Finnish chose to follow a compromise: mostly following Eastern Finnish, but -j- was kept, in line with Western Finnish, after a liquid and before -e- (e.g., kulɣen > kuljen, and by analogy also kulɣin > kuljin). Furthermore, /ɣ/ between two high round vowels became (or had become) /ʋ/ (e.g., suɣun > suvun).

Another noteworthy change in spelling was that plosives after nasals and liquids began to be spelled as voiceless (mb > mp, ld > lt, nd > nt, ng /nk/ > nk, but ng /ŋŋ/ remains). This began in the late 18th century, but became common only in the 19th century. Additionally, the letters x and z fell out of use, the former replaced by ks (first used by author Jaakko Juteini) and the latter (in tz) by ts. Finnish has not had voiced plosives natively (since their early spirantization), although they are found in loanwords (chiefly from the 19th century onwards) and now also in the Standard Finnish pronunciation of d.

=== Lexicon ===
The Finnish lexicon was in dire need of new words in the 19th century. While loanwords were one option, it was considered easier for Finnish speakers to learn new terms derived within the language. New words were formed using derivative suffixes, but many proved irregular until a better understanding of Finnish morphology developed. Besides the use of suffixes, compounds and phrases were also created to express new concepts. Moreover, dialectal words were adopted to the standard language with new meanings (such as juna "line (of things)" > "train", kone "tool" > "machine", and tehdas "place where something is done, worksite" > "factory"). Terms were not created only for new concepts; some were coined to replace existing loanwords in the spirit of linguistic purism.

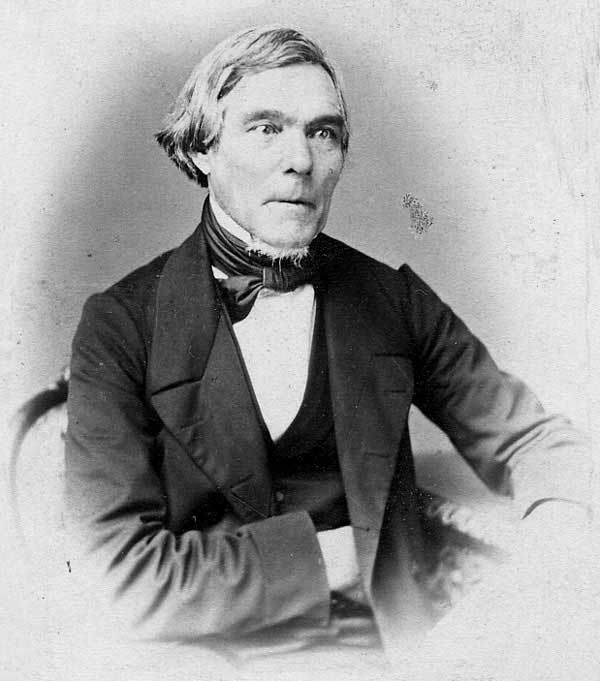
Elias Lönnrot, c. 1880

The single most prolific coiner was Elias Lönnrot, the author of the Kalevala and one of the founders of the Finnish Literature Society. The folk poetry in Kalevala inspired many new words in Standard Finnish. Lönnrot also edited a major Finnish-Swedish dictionary (published in 1880), which introduced a large number of new coinages by Lönnrot and others like Antero Warelius. Lönnrot's coinages (either new words or words adopted with new meanings) include itsenäinen "independent", kansallisuus "nationality", kirjallisuus "literature", kuume "fever", laskimo "vein", monikko "plural", muste "ink", ongelma "problem", tasavalta "republic", and yksikkö "singular".

Wolmar Styrbjörn Schildt (Volmari Kilpinen), besides being a prolific translator, was known to coin new words in lists, which he published or sent to Lönnrot. Schildt's coinages that remain in use include aste "degree", esine "thing, object", henkinen "mental", kirje "letter (written correspondence)", myymälä "shop, store", taide "art", and tiede "science". He also coined henkilö "person", though he later regretted coining a word ending in ö. Perhaps the most ambitious of Schildt's ideas was to change Finnish spelling by using a circumflex (e.g. â) to mark long vowels instead of doubling the letter (aa). This did not catch on despite Schildt's insistence, as Finnish orthography had already become too established.

Daniel Europaeus coined many new words, but was never liked by his peers. He came from a partly lowly background, and he was said to be hard to work with. Europaeus also gathered more folk poetry for an expanded edition of Kalevala, including the Kullervo story arc. Some of the words Europeaus coined that are still used are eduskunta "(the Finnish) parliament", enemmistö "majority", huvila "villa", suunnikas "parallelogram", and tasa-arvo "equality".

Paavo Tikkanen was the editor-in-chief of Suometar, an important newspaper for the development of new Finnish vocabulary. He is credited with coining the words mielipide "opinion", teollisuus "industry" and valtio "state, polity".

Several others also coined multiple words into Standard Finnish, and these include (with some examples for each):

- Reinhold von Becker: ihmiskunta "humanity", keksintö "an invention", sanomalehti "newspaper"; from dialects he adapted sivistää "to civilize"
- Samuel Roos: sähkö "electricity"; from dialects he adapted kaasu "gas", kasvi "plant"
- Abraham Poppius: maantieto "geography"; from dialects he adapted kerätä "to gather", tilaisuus "occasion"
- Carl Axel Gottlund: huutokauppa "auction", kirjasto "library", sepittää "to make up, coin (a word)"
- Pietari Hannikainen: käsityöläinen "artisan, craftsman", neuvosto "council", tulevaisuus "future"
- August Ahlqvist: lähettiläs "emissary", puolue "(political) party"

However, not all proposed coinages were successful, and many (perhaps even the majority) fell out of use. For example, Lönnrot coined the word lieke for electricity, but Roos's sähkö won out in the end.

=== Status of Finnish ===
The growing status of Finnish soon led to a conflict between those favoring Finnish (the "Fennomans") and those favoring Swedish (the "Svecomans"). Many of the Fennomans, such as Johan Vilhelm Snellman, were themselves native Swedish speakers who learned to speak Finnish, resulting—for the first time—in a significant population of Finnish-speaking intellectuals.

Academic interest in Finnish grew; many grammars were published in the 1840s and 1850s. Antero Warelius conducted ethnographic studies and surveyed Finnish dialects. Carl Niclas Keckman was appointed as the first lecturer of Finnish in 1829. The first professorship in Finnish language and literature was established at University of Helsinki in 1850; Matthias Castrén was appointed as the first professor, but after he died in 1852, he was replaced by Lönnrot. In 1858, the first Finnish-language school was established in Jyväskylä, largely thanks to Schildt's efforts.

A major victory for the Fennomans came in 1863, when Emperor of Russia Alexander II passed the Language Act, which made Finnish an official language in Finland for the first time and defined a transition period of 20 years. Despite the originally specified transition period, Finnish did not attain equal status until 1902.

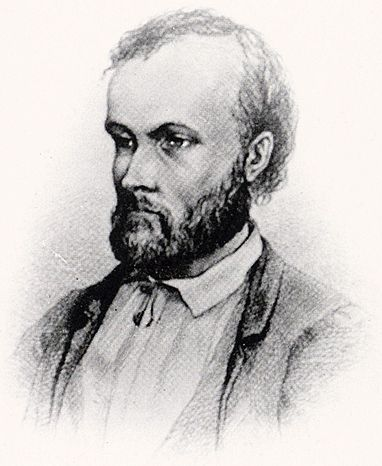
Albert Edelfelt's impression of Aleksis Kivi

By the end of the Early Modern Finnish period, Finnish was widely used in education, administration, and the justice system. In 1870, Aleksis Kivi published what is widely considered the first Finnish-language novel, Seitsemän veljestä, marking an important development in Finnish literature.

== Modern Finnish ==
=== Standard language ===
In the Modern Finnish period, new words—both coinages and borrowings—have continued to enter the language. Grammatical and morphological changes have slowed significantly, but not entirely ceased. There has been a preference towards shorter forms (e.g. kutsumus > kutsu, saapi > saa, pojallansa > pojallaan), as well as to further undo Swedish influence on grammar and syntax. Particles like kun and kuin are now distinguished, and the rules for whether to spell certain verbs with -ottaa or -oittaa have been defined.

Linguistic purism has continued into the Modern Finnish period. E. A. Saarimaa's language guide, published in 1930, criticized the extensive Swedish influence on Finnish and proved highly influential in the coming decades. Some of the features criticized by Saarimaa have largely disappeared from Finnish, such as the routine imitation of indirect Swedish word order, while others have become less common, such as compound adjectives using rikas and vapaa. Others remain in use, such as denoting features or accessories with the adessive case.

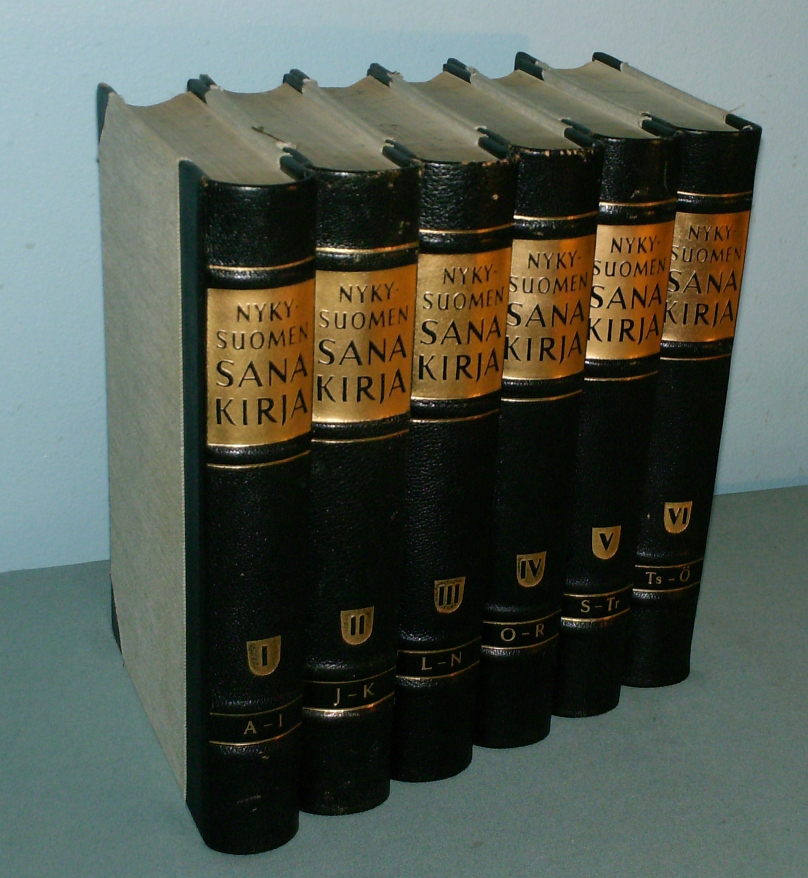
Nykysuomen sanakirja

The Finnish Language Office (Kielitoimisto) was established in 1945 as part of the Finnish Literature Society. In 1976, it was integrated into the Institute for the Languages of Finland, which remains the authority on Finnish language planning. Nykysuomen sanakirja, the most comprehensive monolingual Finnish dictionary, was published between 1951 and 1961.

Noteworthy 20th-century neologisms that became accepted in Standard Finnish include haastatella "to interview" (Artturi Kannisto, 1907), elokuva "film, movie" (Artturi Kannisto, 1927), mainos "advertisement" (E. A. Saarimaa, 1928), muovi "plastic" (Lauri Hakulinen, 1947), juontaa "to host, present (an event)" (Hannes Teppo, 1951), and palaute "feedback" (1970).

=== Dialects ===
Finland lost approximately 10% of its territory in the Second World War. The South Karelian dialects were affected the most, as most of the dialect region was ceded to the Soviet Union. The dialects were diffused throughout Finland as a result of the resettlement of Finns from the ceded regions to the rest of the country.

Internal migration, urbanization and media have significantly influenced the development of Finnish dialects. While some dialectal features described in the early 20th century have disappeared, others remain vibrant, and dialectal and regional variation is still significant. The colloquial variety spoken in and around the capital Helsinki could be considered its own dialect.

Certain features previously described as dialectal or colloquial have since been accepted into the standard language. A notable example concerns the choice of verb form used with alkaa 'to begin', either alkaa tehdä or alkaa tekemään. The former is traditionally characteristic of the eastern dialects and became the only accepted form in Standard Finnish in the late 19th century. However, both forms continued to be used, and in 2014 the Finnish Language Board officially decided to accept both, a decision that sparked significant debate.

However, there are still numerous differences between Standard Finnish and colloquial varieties. Commonly noted features of colloquial Finnish—not accepted in Standard Finnish—include third-person singular verb forms replacing third-person plural forms (ne tekee instead of ne tekevät), impersonal verb forms replacing first-person plural forms (me tehdään instead of me teemme), the so-called double passive (ollaan tehty instead of on tehty), and absence of possessive suffixes (mun kirja instead of minun kirjani).

=== Official language and Finnicization ===
Number of Finnish speakers in Finland 1880–2010
Year	Num.	±% p.a.
1880	1,756,381	—
1890	2,048,545	+1.55%
1900	2,352,990	+1.40%
1910	2,571,145	+0.89%
1920	2,754,228	+0.69%
1930	3,022,257	+0.93%
1940	3,327,534	+0.97%
1950	3,670,918	+0.99%
1960	4,108,269	+1.13%
1970	4,286,895	+0.43%
1980	4,473,646	+0.43%
1990	4,675,223	+0.44%
2000	4,788,497	+0.24%
2010	4,857,903	+0.14%
Sources: for 1880–1900, for 1910–2010.

The 1902 Language Decree consolidated the use of the Finnish language in administration and granted it equal status with Swedish. The Constitution Act of 1919, passed after Finland became independent in 1917, established Finnish and Swedish as the two official languages in Finland, and the language decree passed on 1 January 1923 formally made Finnish and Swedish equal in status. Both remain co-official languages today.

The Fennoman movement and language strife continued well into the 20th century. Many Fennomans Finnicized their names in the early 20th century. A major point of contention in the first half of the 20th century was the status of Finnish in universities. The sole university in Finland, the Imperial Alexander University, still taught in Swedish. After its reorganization as the University of Helsinki in 1919, both Finnish and Swedish were declared languages of instruction. Despite this, the conflict continued until the bilingual arrangement settled in the 1930s. The language conflict contributed to the establishment of not one, but two universities in Turku: the Swedish-language Åbo Akademi University in 1918 and the Finnish-language University of Turku in 1920. The former was founded by those who felt that the University of Helsinki was being Finnicized too quickly, while the latter was founded by those who felt that it was not being Finnicized quickly enough.

Finnish has also been one of the official languages of the European Union since Finland's accession in 1995.

=== 21st-century developments ===
The increasing use of English in Finnish education, as well as the 2020s AI boom, has raised concerns regarding the relegation of Finnish to a merely vernacular language.

== Finnish abroad ==
In the late 16th and early 17th centuries, Finns mainly from Savonia moved to the forests in western Sweden and eastern Norway and became known as the Forest Finns. The Finnish language survived among them until the 1960s. In the 19th century, Carl Axel Gottlund documented the Forest Finns extensively, advocated for their rights and helped raise attention for their cause in Finland.

In the 17th century, after the Ingrian War, Sweden gained control of Ingria. The Finnic-speaking populations of Ingria, Izhorians and Vots, were of Eastern Orthodox faith. Sweden encouraged Lutheran Finnish settlers to move to the region; they became the Ingrian Finns. By the end of the century, they comprised three-fourths of the population of Ingria. The 1926 Soviet census recorded 114,831 Leningrad Finns (Ingrian Finns), the vast majority of whom were Finnish-speaking. The Ingrian Finnish dialects survived in the region until the Soviet genocide in the 1930s.

Finnish speakers also persisted in northern Sweden and Norway. The Finnish speakers in Sweden were separated from the speakers in Finland after 1809, when Russia annexed Finland from Sweden, resulting in a new border. These speakers in the Torne River Valley were thus isolated from 19th-century developments in Finnish, and their language is now referred to as Meänkieli. Whether it is an independent language from Finnish is disputed, although it is recognized as an official minority language in Sweden. Large numbers of Finnish speakers began to move to Norway in the 18th and 19th centuries, and their language is now known as the Kven language; similar to Meänkieli, it is an officially recognized minority language in Norway, and its status as an independent language is disputed.

Finnish migrations resulted in the emergence of a Finnish diaspora in North America. American Finnish does not represent a single, unified variety, as emigrants from different regions brought their dialects with them. While American Finnish has many borrowings from English, they are adapted to fit Finnish phonology and often represent only specialized terms, rather than the core vocabulary. In 2013, Finnish was spoken by 26,000 people in their homes in the United States, and there are also speakers in Canada.

A second Finnish-speaking minority emerged in Sweden mainly due to emigration from the 1950s to the 1970s. In Sweden, Finnish (as separate from Meänkieli) has been an officially recognized minority language since 1999.

== Internal history ==
=== Proto-Northern Finnic ===
Among the sound and grammatical changes that can be noted from Late Proto-Finnic to Proto-Northern Finnic are (with Finnish reflexes):

- *kt, *pt > *ht (*koktu > kohtu)
- the third-person singular verb ending *-pi (*anta-pi > dialectal antavi, modern standard antaa)
- *kc > *ks, *pc > *ps (*kakci > kaksi, *lapci > lapsi)
- *ck > *tk (*pucki > putki)
- *c > *s (*cika > sika, *keüci > köysi), except in *cc, *cr
- sporadic *ai > *ei (*haina > heinä, *raici > reisi)
- *ë (e.g. Estonian õ) > *e (*tërva > terva, *lainëh > laine)
- development of *ö in non-initial syllables under vowel harmony (*näko > näkö).

Kallio (2017) outlines that Proto-Northern Finnic phonemes were mostly the same as in Proto-Finnic, but the vowel *ë had merged with *e, and *c was only found in the clusters *cc, *cr:

Proto-Northern Finnic vowels
	Front				Back	
	unrounded		rounded		Back	
	short	long	short	long	short	long
Close	i	iː	y	yː	u	uː
Mid	e	eː	ø	øː	o	oː
Open	æ	æː			ɑ	ɑː

Proto-Northern Finnic consonants
	Labial	Dental/ Alveolar	Palatal	Velar	Glottal
Nasal	m	n			
Plosive	p (~ b)	t (~ d)		k (~ g)	
Affricate		t͡s (*c)			
Fricative		s			h
Approximant	ʋ	l	j		
Trill		r			

=== Early and Medieval Finnish ===
These sound changes apply to Early and Medieval Finnish, the ancestors of Western Finnish. Unless otherwise specified, the sound changes listed below are not necessarily in chronological order.

- The spirantization of *b > *ꞵ (/β/), *d > *ẟ (/ð/), *g > *ɣ (/ɣ/).
  - This also affected plosives in consonant clusters before voiced consonants, *k > *ɣ, *p > *ꞵ, *t > *ẟ.
    - *ɣ and *ꞵ eventually developed into vowels (*u or *ü) in these clusters.
  - Later, *ꞵ merged into v.
  - Separately, or in conjunction, assimilation after nasals of *mb > mm, *nd > *nn, and after liquids, *lẟ > ll, *rẟ > rr.
- *c > *θ, specifically *cc > *θθ, *cr > *θr (later > *hr). Also *sr > *hr.
- *tv > *ẟv.
- The diphthongization of *ee > *ie, *oo > *uo, *öö > *üö (yö).
- Semi-long consonants merge with short consonants (e.g. *k' > *k).
- The elision of intervocalic *ɣ, *ẟ after an unstressed syllable. This change postdates diphthongization (*sateɣen > sateen, not **satien).
- Characteristic southwestern metathesis of *h (*pereh > perhe).
- The elision of intervocalic *h between unstressed syllables, but retained in many Ostrobothnian and northern dialects (and in illative forms also in some southwestern dialects).
- Word-final *-h is lost, although in some dialects it develops into a final -s, especially in South Ostrobothnia.
- Word-final *-k becomes a glottal stop, although in some dialects it develops into a final -t, especially in Ostrobothnia (still found in South Ostrobothnia).
- The assimilation *eü > *öü (öy) in initial syllables.
- The assimilation *iü > *üü in initial syllables when followed by *e or *i in the following syllable.

Apocope, at least in certain inflected forms, likely began around the 14th century and rapidly gained ground in the 15th century.

Medieval Finnish is thought to have had the following phonemes, based primarily on Kallio (2017):

Medieval Finnish vowels
	Front				Back	
	unrounded		rounded		Back	
	short	long	short	long	short	long
Close	i	iː	y	yː	u	uː
Mid	e	eː	ø	øː	o	oː
Open	æ	æː			ɑ	ɑː

Medieval Finnish consonants
		Labial	Dental	Alveolar	Palatal	Velar	Glottal
Nasal		m		n			
Plosive		p	t			k	
Fricative	voiceless		θ	s			h
Fricative	voiced		ð			ɣ	
Approximant		ʋ		l	j		
Trill				r			

=== Proto-Karelian ===
These sound changes apply to Proto-Karelian, the ancestor of Eastern Finnish as well as the Karelian language. Unless otherwise specified, the sound changes listed below are not necessarily in chronological order.

- The elision of intervocalic *-d-, *-g-, possibly leaving behind glides in certain positions.
- *b > v.
- *cr > *tr.
- The labialization of *e in non-initial syllables when followed by labial consonants.
- The development of the plural marker *-loi- / *-löi-.

Diphthongization of *ee, *oo, *öö did not yet occur in Proto-Karelian, and instead spread from the western dialects to Eastern Finnish and to Karelian through the Savonian dialects after the breakup of Proto-Karelian.

=== Common to all Finnish dialects ===
- The third-person singular present verb ending *-bi develops into *-u / *-y. This later develops into a simple long vowel in Western Finnish.
- The impersonal present verb ending *-ksen is replaced by *-hen.

=== Later sound changes ===
- ŋ develops into a phoneme, likely by Old Literary Finnish, implying ŋg > ŋŋ.
- The loss of -i- in -Vi- diphthongs in non-initial syllables, more broad in dialects than the standard language, where it is retained in many positions. In South Ostrobothnia, these diphthongs develop into a long monophthong; this has occurred even in nominals ending in *-oi, *-ei, which in standard language are represented simply as -o, -i (e.g. taloo, äitee for standard talo, äiti < *taloi, *äitei).
- Eastern Finnish loss of intervocalic -h- after unstressed syllables, similar to Western Finnish; this change happened later than the loss of -g- and -d-.
- Western Finnish *ẟ disappears, mainly turning into *r in the southwestern and Ostrobothnian dialects, and *l in the Tavastian dialects. This change, likely beginning in the modern era, was however gradual, and the dental fricative survived well into the 20th century in some regions.
- Western Finnish *θθ (the only context in which *θ appeared) mainly developed into tt, although ss was also found in some dialects in Uusimaa and Central Ostrobothnia. This change likely occurred at the same time as the preceding change eliminating *ẟ.
- Western Finnish *ɣ is eliminated around the 18th century.
  - In many positions, it is eliminated entirely.
    - As an exception, it develops into v between two high round vowels (e.g., suɣun > suvun).
  - After a liquid -l- or -r-:
    - In southwestern dialects, it developed into a glide (v before a labial vowel, j otherwise).
    - In Tavastian dialects, it vocalized (jalɣan > jalaan).
    - In South Ostrobothnia, front vowels have a glide, back vowels have full vocalization.
  - The corresponding positions have nothing in the eastern dialects (due to the early loss of *-g- in Proto-Karelian).
- *c is mostly eliminated from Eastern Finnish as well, as *cc develops into *ss in a region spanning from Vyborg to Mikkeli. *cc as ts remains in some dialects on the Karelian Isthmus. In many Savonian dialects, *cc is reflected as ht, which reflects the original Tavastian *θθ.
- Common gemination (yleisgeminaatio) begins to develop in the Northern Savonian dialects around the end of the 17th century and begins to spread from there.

== Bibliography ==
- Aikio, Ante (2022). "Proto-Uralic". In Bakró-Nagy, Marianne; Laakso, Johanna; Skribnik, Elena (eds.). The Oxford Guide to the Uralic Languages. Oxford University Press. pp. 3–27. ISBN 978-0-19-876766-4.
- Grünthal, Riho; Heyd, Volker; Holopainen, Sampsa; Janhunen, Juha A.; Khanina, Olesya; Miestamo, Matti; Nichols, Johanna; Saarikivi, Janne; Sinnemäki, Kaius (2022-08-29). "Drastic demographic events triggered the Uralic spread". Diachronica. 39 (4): 490–524. doi:10.1075/dia.20038.gru. ISSN 0176-4225.
- Hakulinen, Lauri (1961). The Structure and Development of the Finnish Language. Indiana University Publications Uralic and Altaic Series. Vol. 3. Translated by Atkinson, John. Bloomington: Indiana University.
- Häkkinen, Kaisa (2016). Spreading the Written Word: Mikael Agricola and the Birth of Literary Finnish. Translated by Pearl, Leonard. Helsinki: Finnish Literature Society. ISBN 978-952-222-755-3.
- Kallio, Petri (2017). "Äännehistoriaa suomen kielen erilliskehityksen alkutaipaleilta". Sananjalka (in Finnish). 59 (59): 7–24. doi:10.30673/sja.66609.
- Lang, Valter (2018). Läänemeresoome tulemised. Muinasaja teadus 28 (in Estonian). Tartu Ülikooli Kirjastus. ISBN 978-9949-77-662-7.
- Lehikoinen, Laila; Kiuru, Silva (1991). Kirjasuomen kehitys (in Finnish). Helsinki: Helsingin yliopiston suomen kielen laitos. ISBN 951-45-5073-0.
- Lehtinen, Tapani (2007). Kielen vuosituhannet (in Finnish). Helsinki: Suomalaisen Kirjallisuuden Seura. ISBN 978-951-746-896-1.
- Mantila, Harri (2025). Suomen nykymurteet (in Finnish). Helsinki: Suomalaisen Kirjallisuuden Seura. ISBN 978-951-858-984-9.
- Nummila, Kirsi-Maria (2025). Kirjoitetun suomen historia (in Finnish). Helsinki: Suomalaisen Kirjallisuuden Seura. ISBN 978-951-858-960-3.
