= Gregorius Favorinus =

Finnish Bible translator

- Born: Gregorius Matthiae Favorinus c. 1600; Tyrväntö, Sweden
- Died: Spring 1660; Hattula, Sweden
- Occupations: Land provost, vicar in Masku and Hattula
- Known for: Participation in Bible translation into Finnish
- Notable work: Finnish Bible "Biblia"; 1642 edition
- Spouses: Aliza Jakobsdotter; Brita NN
- Children: Johan (1633–1672); Erik (d. 1712)
- Father: Matti Niilonpoika

Gregorius Matthiae Favorinus (c. 1600 – 1660) was a Finnish land provost and Bible translator.

Favorinus was born in Tyrväntö, Tavastia to a farmer family. He studied to become a priest and served as a military chaplain, until he returned to Finland and became vicar.

Favorinus took part in the Finnish Bible translation of the 1642 edition.

== Early career ==
Favorius was born in Siukola house, Suotaala, Tyrväntö in the 1590s or around 1600. His father was farmer Matti Niilonpoika (Matts Nilsson in Swedish sources). Favorinus studied at Turku Cathedral School.

Jacob De la Gardie called him to work as regiment pastor in Riga in 1624. Depending on sources, he served in military for four years, or returned in Finland in the following year with the regiment of Nils Assersson Mannersköld, and followed Paulus Johannis Paulinus as interim vicar of Hattula during 1625–1627. Favorinus worked as chaplain in the Turku Cathedral Finnish-speaking parish in 1628–1632. In 1633 he became vicar of Piikkiö; he was possibly appointed formally already in 1631.

== Bible translation ==
Favorinus was called to participate in Aeschillus Petraeus's Bible translation committee in April 1638. His versatile knowledge of Finnish language was valued, as the objective was to write Bible in "pure and universally understandable Finnish". The other members were professor Martinus Stodius and Masku provost Henrik Hoffman. Presumably Tavastian-born Favorinus diversified the language among Stodius and Hoffman, who were from Finland Proper. Each member of committee translated certain parts, which were reviewed in meetings. It is not known who translated what. The Old Testament was finished in 1640, after which it was printed in Stockholm. The New Testament followed in 1641 and the project was completed in the following year; "the most humble subjects" Petraeus, Hoffman, Strodius and Favorinus dedicated their foreword to Queen Christina, dated 20 July 1642.

Each member of committee was granted 30 unbound copies of Bible and tax reliefs; in case of Favorinus the latter one meant tax exemption to his property in Saari village in Paimio. Moreover, he received 100 silver thalers for travel expenses and he was appointed provost.

== Other work ==
Favorinus took part in the opening of Royal Academy of Turku in 1640. After the Bible translation project, Favorinus and Stodius helped Petraeus write a Finnish grammar book which was issued in 1649. Favorinus's dissertation was dedicated in Turku on 24 November 1649. He translated Johan Avenarius's prayer book, which was, however, not published due to lack of funds.

== Late years ==
Favorinus was appointed vicar and land provost of Hattula in 1651. Besides the church's work, he had to resolve disputes between nobility and clergy in Janakkala. Some records of Favorinus's visitations in Janakkala, Loppi, Sahalahti and Vanaja parishes in spring and autumn 1659 have survived.

Favorinus died in spring 1660; he is mentioned as being deceased in a document dated 25 May 1660.

== Family ==
Favorinus was married twice. His first wife was Aliza Jakobsdotter was mentioned in 1634; she was in her second marriage. The second wife was Brita, whose background is unknown; she lived as widow after Favorinus died. Favorinus had two sons: Johan (1633–1672) worked as vicar in Hämeenkyrö and Erik (died 1712) was vicar of Loppi.
