= Wolmar Schildt =

Wolmar Schildt may refer to:

- Wolmar Onni Schildt (1851–1913), Finnish politician
- Wolmar Styrbjörn Schildt (1810–1893), Finnish doctor, translator, and linguist, a developer of modern Finnish vocabulary
