= Abckiria =

First book published in the Finnish language; written by Mikael Agricola

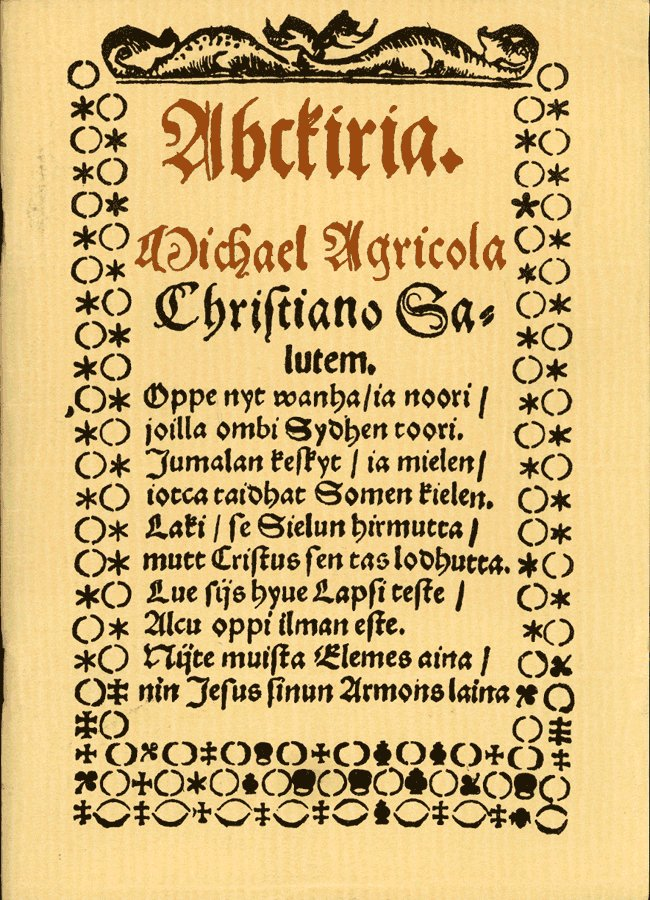
- The first page of Abckiria
- Author: Mikael Agricola
- Language: Old Literary Finnish
- Genre: Alphabet book
- Publication date: 1543 (original); 1551 (expanded edition)
- Pages: 16 pp (original); 24 pp (1551 edition)

Abckiria (also sometimes spelled ABC-kiria, and spelled "ABC-kirja" in contemporary Finnish), in English "ABC book", is the first book that was published in the Finnish language. It was written by Mikael Agricola, a bishop and Lutheran Reformer, and was first published in 1543. Agricola wrote the book while working on the first Finnish translation of the New Testament (which was eventually finished in 1548 as Se Wsi Testamenti).

Abckiria was a primer meant to teach the basics of reading and writing. It contains the alphabet, some spelling exercises, and catechism. The first edition had 16 pages. The second edition, which was written in 1551, had 24 pages. No complete copies of either are known to exist, but general contents of the book have been discerned from the existing material.

In 1966 further missing parts were discovered by a librarian and included a new (likely third) publishing date of 1559.

The catechism includes the Ten Commandments, the Apostles' Creed, the Lord's Prayer, the first part of the Hail Mary, New Testament citations for sacraments of baptism, confession, and the Sacrament of the Body and Blood of Christ. It also includes grace and the morning and evening prayers based on Luther's Small Catechism and three prayers during the ringing of the church bell, apparently as a substitute to the Angelus.

In modern days, the most famous part of the book is the opening poem:

Oppe nyt wanha / ia noori /
joilla ombi Sydhen toori.
Jumalan keskyt / ia mielen /
iotca taidhat Somen kielen.
Laki / se Sielun hirmutta /
mutt Cristus sen tas lodhutta.
Lue sijs hyue Lapsi teste /
Alcu oppi ilman este.
Nijte muista Elemes aina /
nin Jesus sinun Armons laina.

("Learn now, old and young, who have a fresh heart, God's commandments and the mind, so that you shall know the Finnish language. Law, it makes the soul fearful, but Christ soothes it again. So read from here good child, the beginning of learning without obstacles. Remember them all your life, so Jesus lends you his mercy.")

In the modern orthography: Oppia nyt vanha / ja nuori / joilla ompi sydän tuori / Jumalan käskyt / ja mielen / jotka taidat suomen kielen / Laki se sielun hirmuttaa / mutta Kristus sen taas lohduttaa / Lue siis hyvä lapsi tästä / Alkuoppi ilman este't / Niitä muista elämäs aina / niin Jeesus sinun armon's lainaa
