= Antero Warelius =

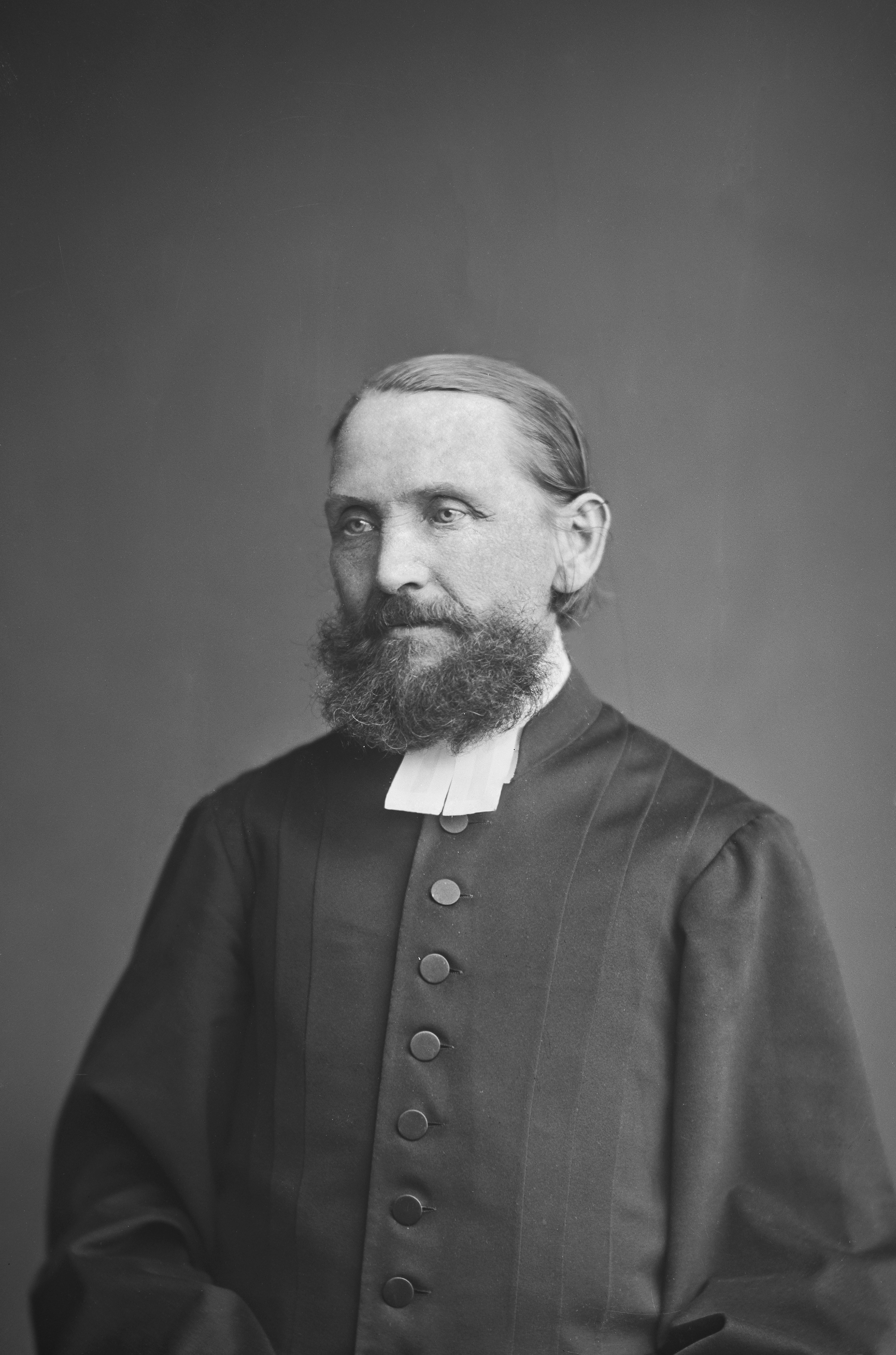
Antero Warelius in 1877

Antero Warelius (14 July 1821 – 16 January 1904) was a Finnish priest and writer. He had interest in the Finnish language, that he studied and contributed to promote as a national language.

Warelius was born in the village of Varila, part of the municipality of Tyrvää, Satakunta county. He served as a priest in western Finland, and between 1869 and 1900 he was vicar in Loimaa. He studied at the University of Helsinki, where he became interested in the academic ambitions of the Finnish language, and with support of the Russian Academy of Sciences in Saint Petersburg he travelled to conduct ethnographic studies of his country, collecting his results in the article Bidrag till Finlands kännedom i etnografiskt hänseende ("Contributions to the knowledge of Finland with respect to ethnography"), published on the Suomi journal. In this work he drew the boundary between the regions populated by the Tavastian and Karelian tribes based, among other things, on a survey of the spoken dialects.

He contributed to the Swedish-Finnish dictionary compiled by Daniel Europaeus, and to the Finnish-Swedish dictionary by Elias Lönnrot. In 1847 he wrote Vekkulit ja Kekkulit, the first original comedy in Finnish language, and in 1845 he published Enon opetuksia luonnon asioista, the first Finnish textbook on natural sciences. In 1847 he co-founded a Finnish newspaper, Suometar, of which he was editor in chief for the first six months.

He died in Loimaa in 1904.

== Publications ==
- Enon opetuksia luonnon asioista (1845)
- Vekkulit ja Kekkulit (1848)
- Kertomus Tyrvään pitäjästä 1853, kartan kanssa (1853)
- Huomen-lahja rippilapsille liiton vahvistamisen juhlana (1856)
- Tekemistö valtointen lasku-tapulain myötä joita tässä on 90 A. Wareliukselta(1859)
- Papiston palkoista ja muista seurakuntalaisilta suoritettavista eduista (1860)
- Peijais-puheita eli kristillisiä niuistutteita mureh-väelle lohdutukseksi, kehoitukseksi ja varoitukseksi (1861)
- Saatanto Tuonelaan eli ilmoitteita miten meikäläiset kuolleenkorjaustavat ovat muodostuneet (1861)
- Mikä mies Agrikola oli? (1865)
- Hvem var Agricola? (1865)
- Puhe Turun pääkirkossa Suomalaisen Evankeli-seuran vuosijuhlalla lokak. 31 p:nä 18644, A. Wareliuksen pitämä (1865)
- Suomen kansaa (1985)
