= Biblia, se on Coco Pyhä Ramattu Suomexi =

First Finnish translation of the Bible

Biblia, Se on Coco Pyhä Ramattu Suomexi
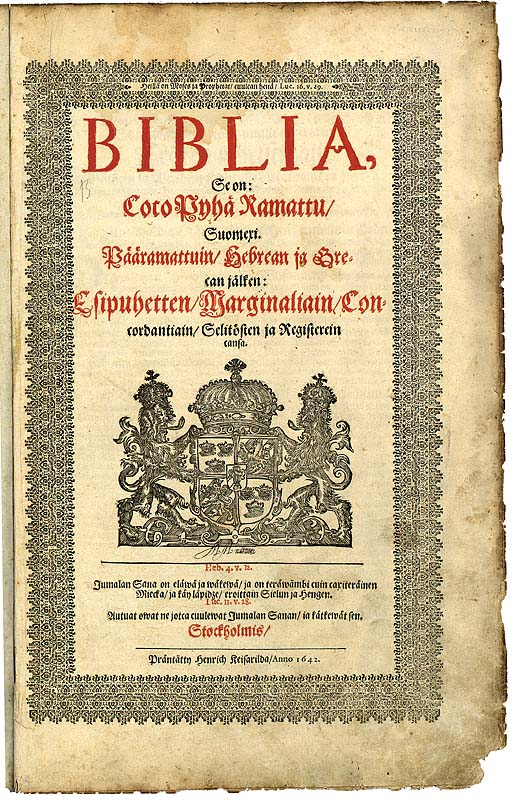
- Language: Finnish
- Derived from: Se Wsi Testamenti
- Textual basis: Textus Receptus
- Genesis 1:1–3 Alussa loi Jumala taivaan ja maan. Ja maa oli autio ja tyhjä, ja pimeys oli syvyyden päällä, ja Jumalan Henki liikkui vetten päällä. Ja Jumala sanoi: tulkoon valkeus, ja valkeus tuli. John 3:16 Sillä niin on Jumala maailmaa rakastanut, että hän antoi ainoan Poikansa, että jokainen, joka uskoo hänen päällensä, ei pidä hukkuman, mutta ijankaikkisen elämän saaman.

Biblia (longer title: Biblia, se on Coco Pyhä Ramattu Suomexi, archaic Finnish for "The Bible, that is the Complete Holy Bible in Finnish") was the first complete translation of the Bible into the Finnish language, published in 1642 for use by the Church of Sweden in Finland. Today, the term Biblia in Finland primarily refers to the latest edition of the translation from 1776, also known as Vanha kirkkoraamattu ("the Old Church Bible"). It was officially replaced by a newer translation into Finnish in 1933 and 1938.

== History ==
In 1602, Duke Charles, the Regent of Sweden (later King Charles IX), established a committee to produce a Finnish-language Bible translation. The text of this translation was partially based on the translations of the New Testament and parts of the Old Testament made by Mikael Agricola earlier in the 16th century. The first edition was produced in Stockholm in 1642, but only slightly more than half of the copies were delivered to Finland. The first edition with revised language was the Bible printed in Turku in 1685, known as Gezeliuksen raamattu ("Gezelius's Bible") or informally Sotaraamattu ("the War Bible"). Revised editions were again produced in 1758 and 1776, with the latter edition being reprinted until the early 20th century.
