= Suomenkieliset Tieto-Sanomat =

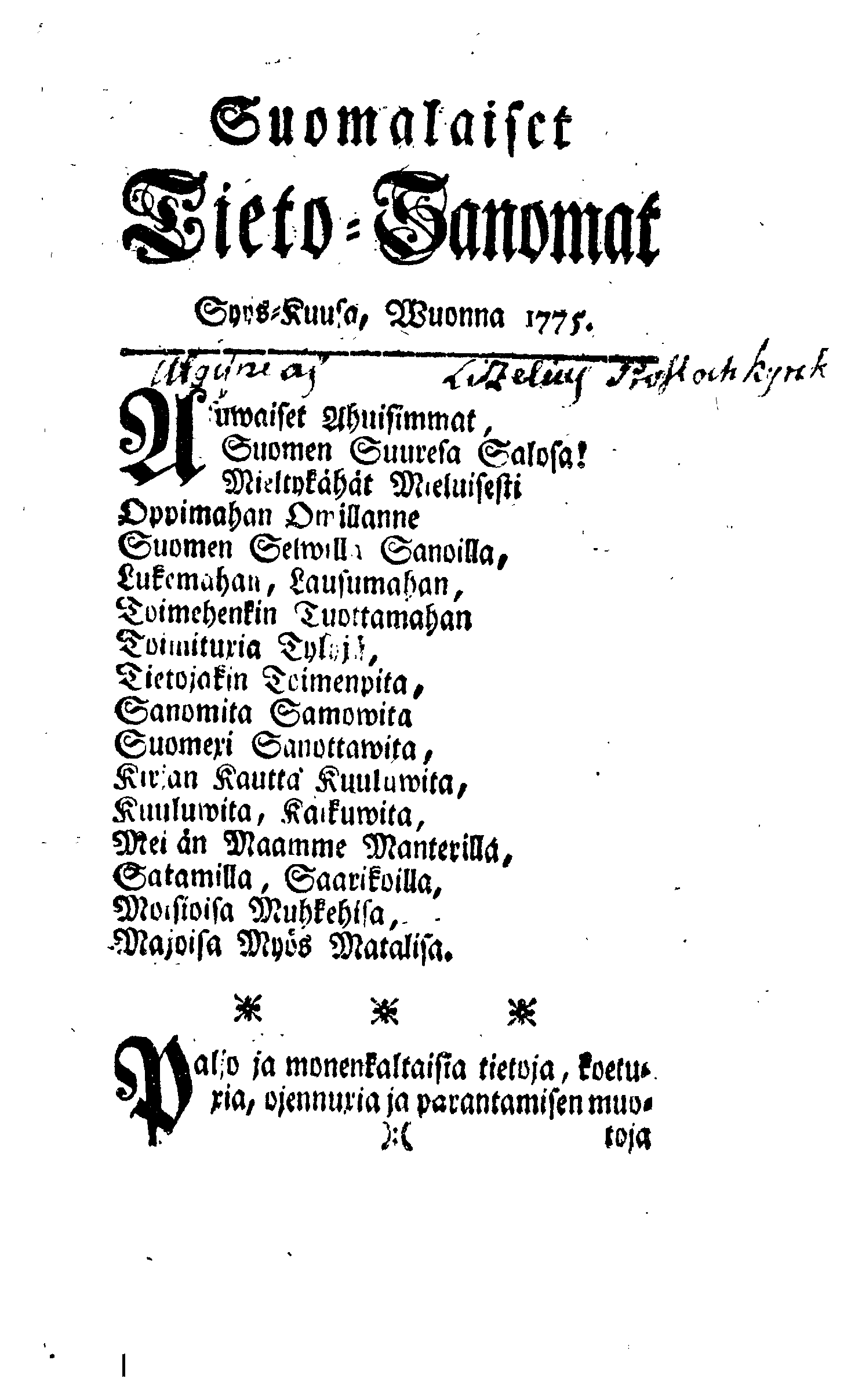
- September 1775 issue
- Founded: 1 September 1775
- Language: Finnish
- Headquarters: Turku, Finland

Suomenkieliset Tieto-Sanomat was the first Finnish language newspaper. It was published in Turku twice a month in 1775 and 1776. The magazine's editor was Antti Lizelius.
