= Bible translations into Finnish =

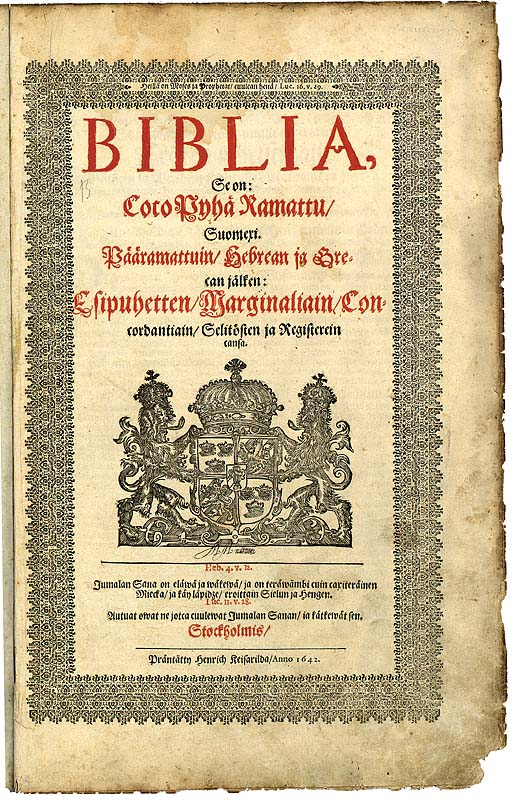
Biblia, se on Coco Pyhä Ramattu Suomexi (1642), the oldest official translation of the Evangelical Lutheran Church of Finland, is still used by some.

The official translation used by the state church, the Evangelical Lutheran Church of Finland, is approved by its Synod. There have been three official translations: Biblia, se on Coco Pyhä Ramattu Suomexi (1642), Pyhä Raamattu (1933/1938), and the current one Uusi kirkkoraamattu (1992/2007). The term kirkkoraamattu means that the edition has to be suited for service of worship and other needs of the church.

The 1933/1938 Bible was translated using the technique of formal equivalence. It had a short-lived successor, the Uusi testamentti nykysuomeksi (1973), which uses dynamic equivalence. This is also the principle of the current official translation from 1992/2007. The latest edition has faced criticism from certain Christians, and rival editions that return to the principle of formal equivalence have surfaced: Raamattu Kansalle (1999/2012) and Jumalan Kansan Raamattu (1992).

== Background ==
Translations of the Bible into Finnish have their background in the Reformation and birth of humanism. The Luther Bible (1534) continued to impact Finnish translations for centuries to come.

== Translations ==
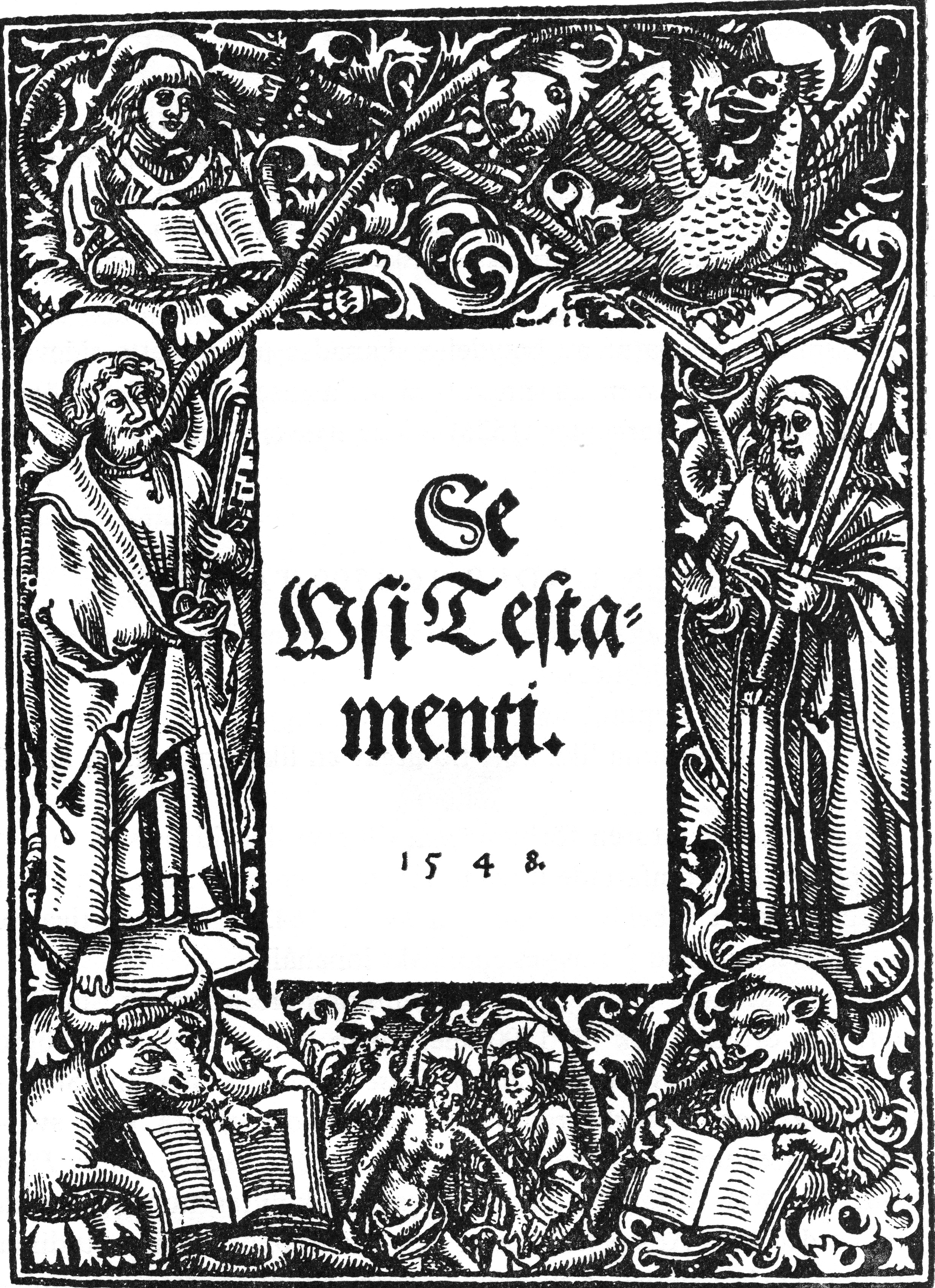
Se Wsi Testamenti Somexi (1548), the first Finnish Bible translation

The first Finnish translation of the Bible was Mikael Agricola's translation of the New Testament: Se Wsi Testamenti Somexi (The New Testament in Finnish). Agricola started working on the translation while he was studying in Germany between 1536 and 1539, or perhaps even earlier. It was published in 1548. Agricola also translated parts of the Old Testament. It is likely that Agricola had assistants. Agricola's translations drew influence from various sources: the Vulgate, Desiderius Erasmus's Greek Novum Instrumentum omne (1516), the Luther Bible, and the Gustav Vasa Bible (1541). Agricola is today considered the father of literary Finnish.

The first translation of the whole Bible was the so-called Vanha kirkkoraamattu (Old Church Bible), titled Biblia: Se on: Coco Pyhä Ramattu Suomexi (1642). This edition was translated between 1638 and 1641 by a committee led by Bishop Isaacus Rothovius and was published in 1642. It was revised in between 1683 and 1685 (Florinus). It is still used by some, although as a revised edition.

As the Finnish written and spoken language evolved during the centuries and literacy became commonplace also amongst the laypeople, a need for a new edition arose. The so-called Biblia or Vuoden 1776 raamattu (1776 Bible) was published in 1776. This was the first edition meant not only for ecclesiastical but also for domestic use, and was the first to be written in Modern Finnish. It was revised in 1859. The 1776 Bible is the version used by two revival movements (the Laestadians and the "Beseechers") within the Evangelical Lutheran Church of Finland even today. This is because it, unlike the newer translations, is based on the Textus Receptus, as is, for instance, the English King James Version.

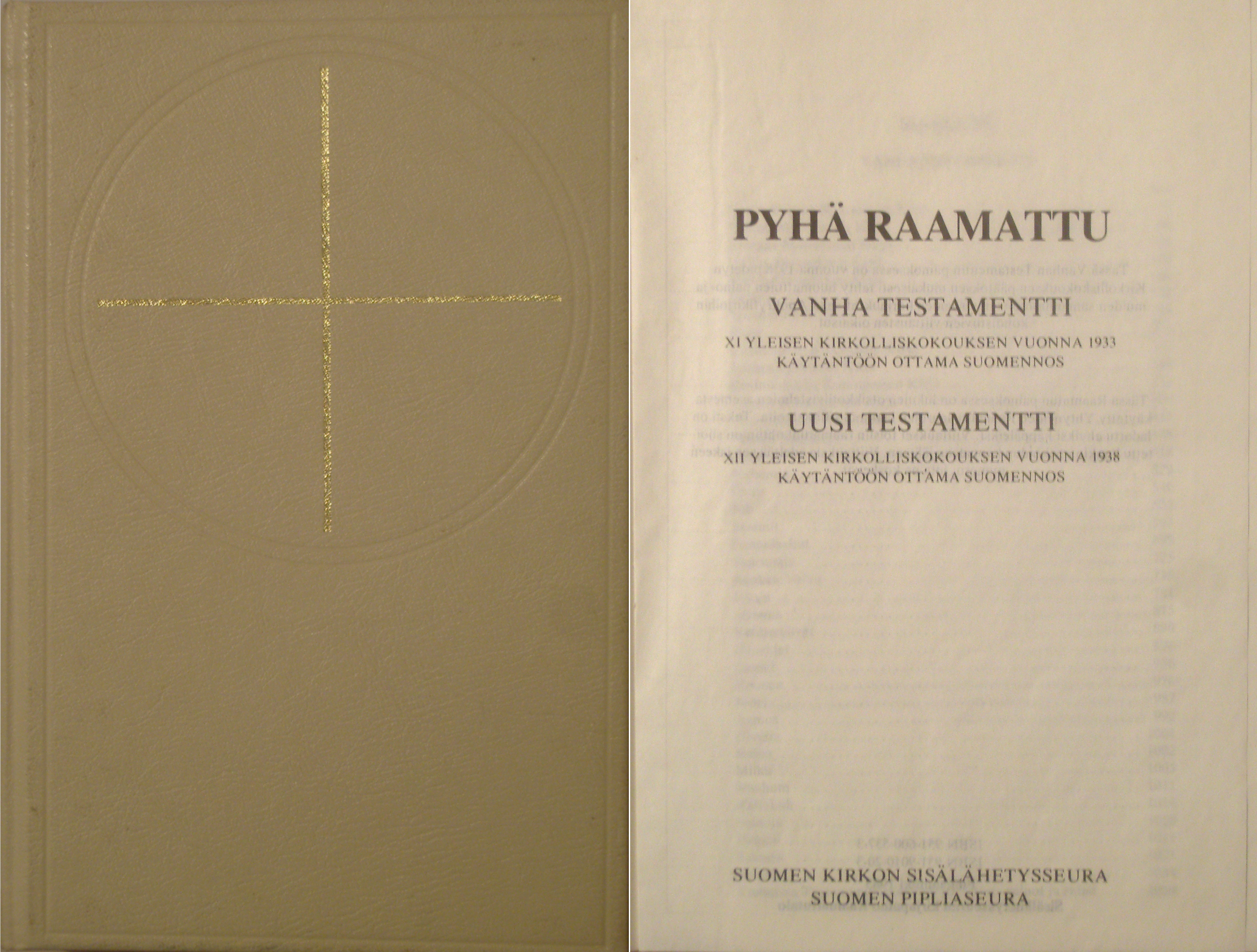
Vuoden 1938 kirkkoraamattu

Again a new translation was needed in the early 20th century, and a translation committee was set up in 1911. It had its work ready 1933. The full edition of the Bible was published in 1938. This edition is often referred to as the Pyhä Raamattu. It was translated by the Finnish Lutheran Church and intended for Lutheran use. The method of translation was "one source language word – one Finnish word". The 1938 edition consisted of the Old Testament, deuterocanonicals and the New Testament. In translation, it uses the technique of formal equivalence. The language was archaic even contemporaneously, as it aimed to create a solemn mood against both the meaning of the original text as well as conventions of the Finnish language.

Uusi testamentti nykysuomeksi (New Testament and Psalms in modern Finnish) is a 1973 translation by the Finnish Bible Society and Suomen Kirkon Sisälähetysseura. The translation proved short-lived, because of the publication of Uusi kirkkoraamattu (New Church Bible) in 1992. The translation technique used in Uusi testamentti nykysuomeksi is that of dynamic equivalence.

The latest official Finnish translation dates from 1992, the so-called Uusi kirkkoraamattu (New Church Bible). It is the first Finnish ecumenical edition; the translation committee consisted not only of the representatives of the Finnish Lutheran Church, but also of academics and representatives of the Finnish Orthodox Church and Finnish Catholic Church, and is intended for the use of all Christian denominations. The translation technique used in the 1992 edition is dynamic equivalence, and it aims to use ordinary standard Finnish. The initial edition consisted of only the New and Old Testaments: the translation of the Old Testament deuterocanonicals were finished only in 2004.

Uusi kirkkoraamattu was criticized by some as deviating from the original text because of its contextual translation. These critiques sparked a new translation, Raamattu kansalle (Bible for the People), 1999/2012. It strives to use modern Finnish. Another new translation, Jumalan Kansan Pyhä Raamattu (1992; Holy Bible of the People of God) is largely based on the 1933/1938 Church Bible and attempts to correct some errors in it. Both Raamattu kansalle and Jumalan Kansan Pyhä Raamattu return to the principle of formal equivalence used in the 1933/1938 bible.

Uuden Maailman käännös (New World Translation) is an unofficial Finnish translation of the Bible, used by Jehovah's Witnesses. It has been translated from its English version rather than from the original Aramaic and Greek.

The Union of Independent Evangelical Lutheran Congregations in Finland has its own translation of the New Testament and Psalms, published first in 1935 (NT) and 1949 (Psalms) and revised in 1983.

Recently, parts of the Bible have been translated to dialects of Finnish.

== Comparison ==
Official translation of the Evangelical Lutheran Church of Finland

Title	Year	John (Johannes) 3:16	Notes	Ref
Se Wsi Testamenti Somexi	1548	Sille Nein on Jumala Mailma racastanut ette he' andoi hene' ainoan Poicans Sempälle ette Jocaine' quin wsko hene' päle's ei pide huckuma' mutta ijancaikise' Eleme' szama'.		
Biblia: Se on: Coco Pyhä Ramattu Suomexi	1642	Sillä niin on Jumala mailmaa rakastanut, että hän andoi hänen ainoan Poikansa, että jokainen kuin usko hänen päällensä, ei pidä hukkuman, mutta ijankaikkisen elämän saaman.		
Vuoden 1776 raamattu	1776	Sillä niin on Jumala maailmaa rakastanut, että hän antoi ainoan Poikansa, että jokainen, joka uskoo hänen päällensä, ei pidä hukkuman, mutta ijankaikkisen elämän saaman.		
Pyhä Raamattu	1933/1938	Sillä niin on Jumala maailmaa rakastanut, että hän antoi ainokaisen Poikansa, ettei yksikään, joka häneen uskoo, hukkuisi, vaan hänellä olisi iankaikkinen elämä.		
Uusi testamentti nykysuomeksi	1973	Niin paljon Jumala rakasti maailmaa, että hän antoi ainoan Poikansa, ettei yksikään joka häneen uskoo, kuole vaan saa elää ikuisesti.		
Elävä uutinen	1977	Jumala rakasti maailmaa niin paljon, että antoi ainoan Poikansa sitä varten, ettei kukaan, joka uskoo häneen, joutuisi perikatoon vaan saisi ikuisen elämän.	Biblical paraphrase based on The Living Bible	
Uusi kirkkoraamattu	1992/2007	Jumala on rakastanut maailmaa niin paljon, että antoi ainoan Poikansa, jottei yksikään, joka häneen uskoo, joutuisi kadotukseen, vaan saisi iankaikkisen elämän.		
Raamattu Kansalle	1999/2012	Sillä niin on Jumala maailmaa rakastanut, että hän antoi ainutsyntyisen Poikansa, ettei yksikään, joka häneen uskoo, joutuisi kadotukseen, vaan hänellä olisi iankaikkinen elämä.		
Johanneksen evankeliumi Etelä-Pohojanmaan murtehella	1999	Sillä lailla Jumala on mailmaa rakastanu, notta se antoo ainuan Poikansa, jottei kukaan, joka siihen uskoo, hukkuis, vaan sillä olis iankaikkinen elämä.	In Southern Ostrobothnian dialect	
Uusi testamentti stadin slangilla	2001	Niin paljo on Jumala tykänny maailmasta, et se dilkkas ainoon Poikansa, ettei kukaan, joka siihen uskoo, hukkuis, vaan sillä olis iankaikkinen elämä.	In Helsinki slang	
Pyhä Raamattu: Uuden maailman käännös	ed. 2018	Jumala rakasti maailmaa niin paljon, että hän antoi ainosyntyisen Poikansa, jottei kukaan, joka uskoo häneen, tuhoutuisi vaan saisi ikuisen elämän.	New World Translation	

== See also ==
- Christianity in Finland
