= Turku Cathedral School =

Coordinates: 60°27′02.75″N 022°16′30″E

Katedralskolan i Åbo

Location
- Gamla Stortorget 1 Turku, Southwest Finland

Information
- Type: public secondary
- Established: 1276; 750 years ago (reformed 1977)
- Headmaster: Marianne Pärnänen
- Teaching staff: 25
- Grades: Gymnasium (nongraded)
- Gender: coeducational
- Enrollment: 370
- Website: info.edu.turku.fi/katedral
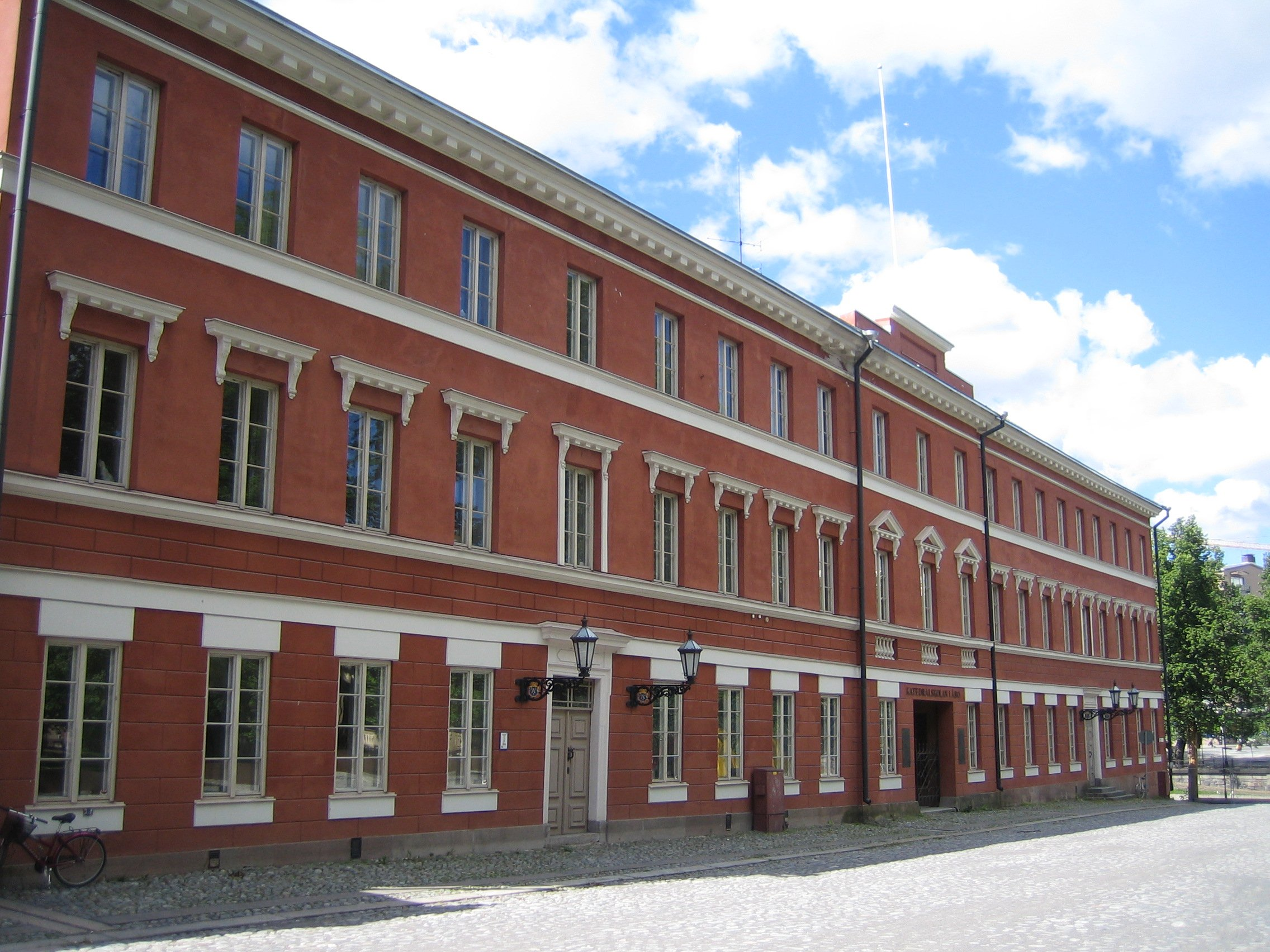
- Katedralskolan at the Old Great Square

Katedralskolan i Åbo (lit. 'The Cathedral School of Åbo', transl. Turku Cathedral School), nicknamed Kattan, is the Swedish-language upper secondary school of Turku, located at the Old Great Square (the town, former capital of Finland, is known as Åbo in Swedish).

The school is believed to have been founded in 1276 for the education of boys to become servants of the Church, a Cathedral school. The schoolhouse was situated within the wall surrounding the Cathedral of Turku. Mikael Agricola, the founder of Finnish literature, was the headmaster of the school 1539-1548. When the Royal Academy of Turku, now the University of Helsinki, was founded in 1640, the senior part of the school formed the core of the new university, while the junior year courses formed a trivial school. The graduates of Turku Cathedral School were eligible to be admitted to the university.

The current schoolhouse was built after the Great Fire of Turku in 1827. In 1830, the city of Turku also obtained a gymnasium, a higher secondary school, while the older Cathedral School became a preparatory school of the new gymnasium. To reflect this, the name of the Cathedral School was changed in 1840 to Högre Elementarläroverk, (lit. 'Higher Elementary School'). In the education reform of 1872, the Högre Elementarläroverk and the gymnasium were merged into Svenska klassiska lyceum i Åbo, a Swedish-speaking classical school. In the 1970s, Svenska klassiska lyceum was merged with Åbo svenska flicklyceum (The Swedish Girls' Secondary School of Turku) and the old school name Katedralskolan i Åbo, the Cathedral School of Turku, was revived.

Since the Swedish Reformation in the early 16th century, the Cathedral School and its successors had been financed by the state. In 1977, the introduction of the comprehensive school system in Turku also caused the transferal of the Katedralskolan to the City of Turku. At the same time, the school lost its five lowest classes (age groups 10–15). Since then, the Cathedral School has denoted the three-year upper secondary school at Gamla Stortorget 1, providing academically-oriented secondary education to comprehensive school graduates.

In theory, the Katedralskolan is the oldest institution of learning in Finland as it has an organizational continuity from the medieval Cathedral school, founded in 1276.

== Notable alumni ==
- Carolus Wrede, business magnate and industrialist.
- Gregorius Favorinus, 17th-century Bible translator

== Publications ==
- Robert Tigerstedt (1919), Åbo gymnasium 1828–1872, Skrifter utgivna av Svenska litteratursällskapet i Finland (in Swedish), Helsinki: Society of Swedish Literature in Finland, ISSN 0039-6842, Wikidata Q113519129
