= Se Wsi Testamenti =

First translation of the New Testament to Finnish; translated by Mikael Agricola

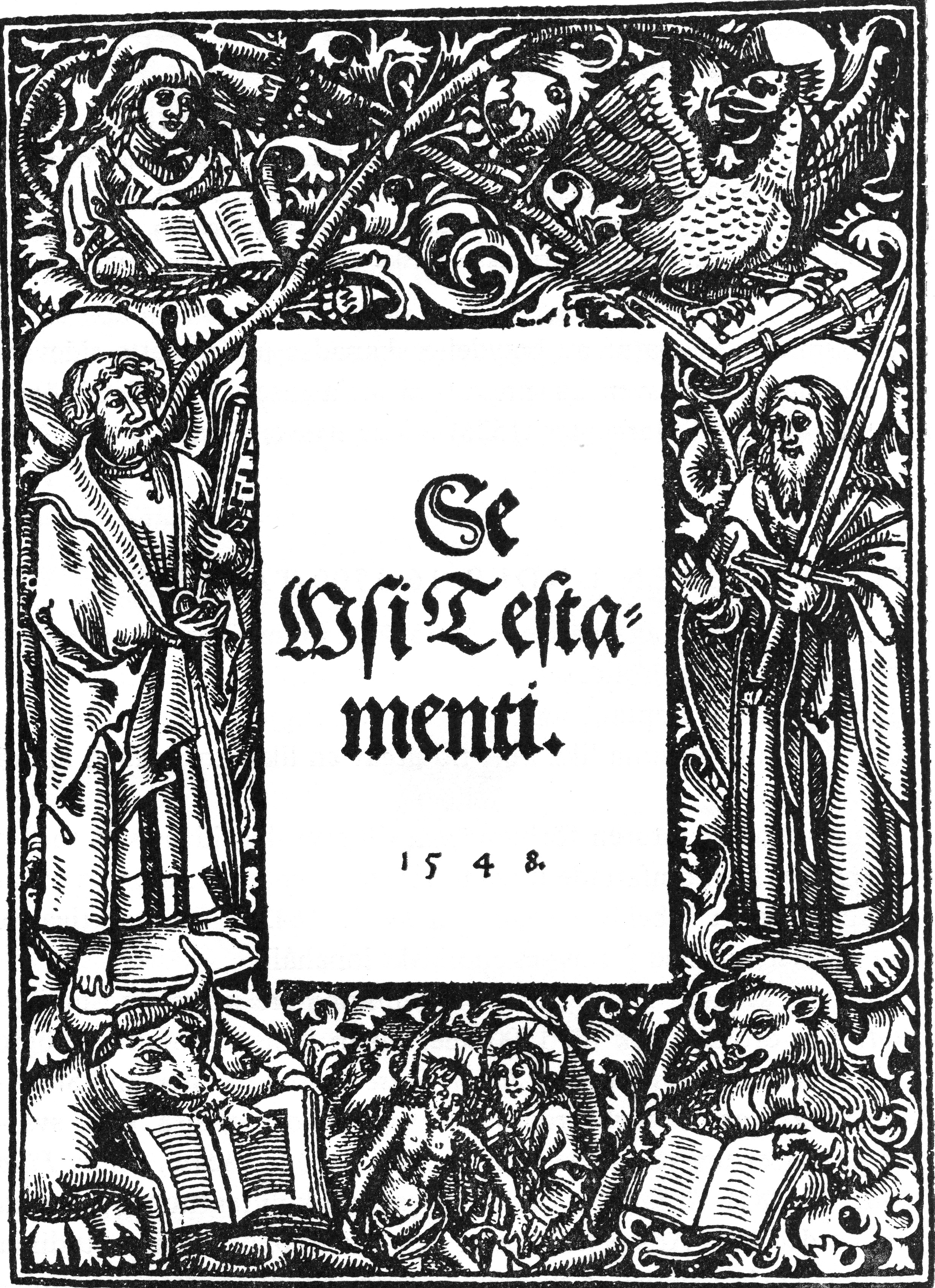
- Language: Finnish
- John 3:16 Sille Nein on Jumala Mailma racastanut/ ette he' andoi hene' ainoan Poicans/ Sempälle/ ette Jocaine' quin wsko hene' päle's ei pide huckuma'/ mutta ijancaikise' Eleme' szama'.

Se Wsi Testamenti (transl. The New Testament; modern Finnish: Uusi testamentti) is the first translation of the New Testament in Finnish; it was published in 1548. It was translated by Mikael Agricola, then rector of the Turku Cathedral School and later Bishop of Turku.

Generally regarded as Agricola's most prominent work, the manuscript was completed in 1543, but it underwent correction for five more years. The whole work took eleven years. The New Testament, printed in Stockholm in 1548, was still based mainly on the dialect of Turku.

== Text ==
Se Wsi Testamenti contains 718 pages and many illustrations. It has two prefaces, practical and theological. In the practical preface Agricola gives reasons for using the Turku dialect and tells how Christianity came into Finland. In the theological preface Agricola tells that his translation was based on the Greek text by Erasmus (familiar to him particularly from his time with Melanchthon), a Latin collection by Erasmus of Rotterdam, a German translation by Martin Luther, as well as the Swedish bibles by Olaus Petri.

== Features ==
Agricola also explains how he had to create many new words and hoped they would be liked and put into use (which they have, although some of them, particularly of animals never seen in Finland, fared less well after encounter with the real animal or object; such as jalopeura or "noble deer" for lion - now called leijona, and kamelikurki or "camel crane" for ostrich - now called strutsi). "Se" (literally "that") in the title is a definite grammatical article (equivalent to "the" in English); modern Finnish has no articles.

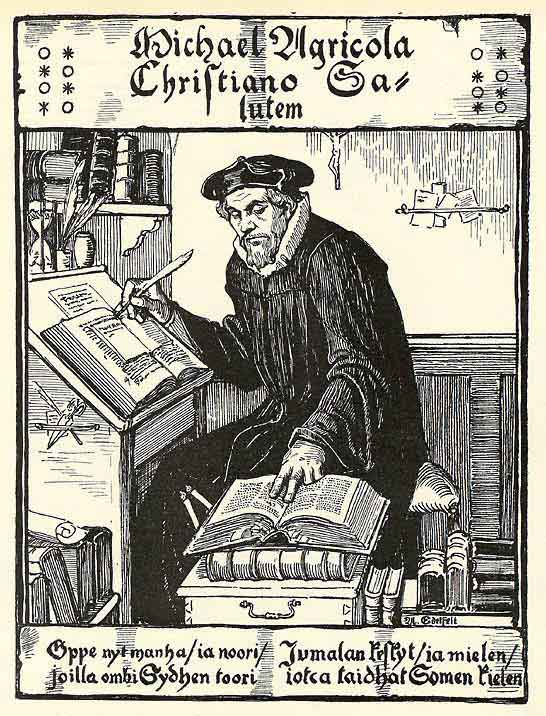
Mikael Agricola

=== Orthography ===
The spelling characteristics of this book are:

- "v" was often written as "w" wanha 'old' (modern Finnish: vanha) or as "u" hyue 'good' (modern Finnish: hyvä)
- "d" was often written as "dh" and is the sound /ð/ sydhen 'heart' (modern Finnish: sydän)
- "ii" was written as "ij" sijs 'so' (modern Finnish: siis)
- "uo" was written as "o" or "oo" noori 'young' (modern Finnish: nuori)
- "ts" was written as "tz", and is pronounced as /θ/
- "ks" was written as "x"
- "k" was written as "c" before back vowels or as "q" before "u" quin 'as if' (modern Finnish: kuin)
- "ä" was often written as "e" ise 'father' (modern Finnish: isä)
- "uu" was written as "w" wsi 'new' (modern Finnish: uusi), as in the title

== See also ==
- Abckiria
- Bible translations into Finnish
