= Tyrväntö =

- Former municipality
- Tyrvännön kunta Tyrvändö kommun
- Coat of arms

- Location of Tyrväntö in the Häme Province
- Coordinates: 61°09′14″N 24°20′08″E
- Country: Finland
- Province: Häme Province
- Region: Kanta-Häme
- Merged into Hattula: 1971
- Seat: Suotaala

Area
  - Land: 91.8 km^{2} (35.4 sq mi)

Population (1969-12-31)
  - Total: 1,683

Tyrväntö is a former municipality of Finland in the Häme Province, now in Kanta-Häme. It was consolidated with Hattula in 1971. The northern part of the former municipality was transferred to Valkeakoski in 1978.

Tyrväntö bordered Hattula, Sääksmäki, Pälkäne and Hauho.

== Geography ==
=== Villages ===
- Suotaala (location of the church)
- Anomaa
- Lahdentaka
- Lepaa
- Lusi
- Monaala
- Mäenpää
- Mälkiäinen
- Retula
- Suontaka
- Tykölä
- Uskila
- Vanajaniemi

=== Lakes ===
The Vanajavesi is partially on the former municipality's territory.

== History ==
The name of Tyrväntö is related to the name of Tyrvää, a former municipality now part of Sastamala. Their names originate from the dialectal word tyrjätä, "to make loud noise, to rumble", referring to the sound of the nearby rapids. Both Tyrväntö and Tyrvää have also had an alternative name Tyrväntä.

Tyrväntö was first mentioned in 1449 as Turfwenesokn, originally a part of Hattula. The Tyrväntö chapel community has also been called Kulsiala, which was also an administrative division encompassing an area greater than that of the parish. The village of Lepaa was first mentioned in 1455. It was the location of a medieval church and was therefore the original administrative center of the chapel community.

Suotaala was first mentioned in 1483 and became the administrative center of the area in the 18th century as the new church was built there. The modern church was built in 1801. The altarpieces and bells were moved from the old Lepaa church.

Tyrväntö became an independent municipality in 1868 and got its own parish in 1930. At its peak, the municipality had 2,168 residents. Tyrväntö was consolidated with Hattula in 1971. In 1978, the villages of Uskila, Mälkiäinen and Tykölä were moved to the Valkeakoski municipality.

== Sights ==
Tyrväntö has a museum focused on Tavastian lake fishing, showcasing fishing and crabbing methods. The museum is located in a granary from the 1800s.

== Services ==
=== Education ===
Lepaa has a school for grades 1-6 (ala-aste/alakoulu).

Gardening education has been offered since 1910. Nowadays the Häme University of Applied Sciences (HAMK) has a gardening sector in Lepaa.
