= Daniel Europaeus =

Finnish linguist and folklore collector

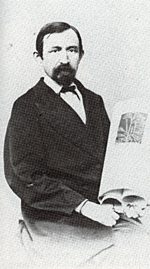
- Born: 1 December 1820; Savitaipale
- Died: 15 May 1884 (aged 63); St. Petersburg
- Awards: Silver medal, Russian Imperial Geographical Society, 1879

Academic background
- Education: Imperial Alexander University

David Emanuel Daniel (Taneli) Europaeus (1820–1884) was a Finnish linguist and folklore collector. He was born to Pietari Aadolf Europaeus and Sofia Peijo.

During the period 1845–54, he made several trips to Finnish and Russian Karelia. Of his large and valuable collections, Elias Lönnrot received, among other things, the entire Kullervo section for the expanded second edition of the Kalevala in 1849. Europaeus also collected Sámi traditions. As a linguist, he was primarily interested in the early history of the Finnish language and the Finnish people. He is considered the founder of onomastics in Finland.

Europaeus was enrolled at the Imperial Alexander University, now the University of Helsinki, for 12 years but did not graduate.

He published a Swedish-Finnish dictionary (1852-53) and Suomalaisten puustavein äännöskuvat (1857). Europaeus was also involved in founding the newspaper "Suometar" in 1846 and served as its editor from 1847 to 1850.

Europaeus conducted research trips to Scandinavia and Germany between 1855 and 1856, and to regions such as Kola Lapland, Novgorod, Tver Karelia, and Aunus. His significant works include Komparativ framställning af de finsk-ungerska språkens räkneord, till bevis för ungrarnes stamförvandskap med finnarne, och den indogermaniska folkstammens urförvandtskap med den finsk-ungerska (1853) and Vorläufiger Entwurff über den Urstamm der indo-europäischen Sprachfamilie (1863).

== Works ==
- Komparativ framställning af de finsk-ungerska språkens räkneord, till bevis för ungrarnes stamförvandskap med finnarne, och den indogermaniska folkstammens urförvandtskap med den finsk-ungerska (1853)
- Suomalaisten puustavein äännöskuvat ylös-ajatellunna D.E.D. Europaeus (1857)
- Kirjoituksia Suomen kansan tärkeimmistä asioista suurimmaksi osaksi syrjä-sensuureita paenneita (1862)
- Vorläufiger Entwurff über den Urstamm der indo-europäischen Sprachfamilie (1863)
- M.A. Castrén, försvarad för missförstånd från ett och för otillbörliga tillvitelser från annat håll (1871)
- Ett fornfolk med långskallig afrikansk hufvudskålstyp i Norden, bestämdt till språk och nationalitet, jemte finsk-ungerska omdömen (1873)
- D.E.D. Europaeuksen kirjeitä ja matkakertomuksia (1903)
- D.E.D. Europaeus (1988)
- Svenskt-finskt handlexikon (1852-1853)
