= Roads in Finland =

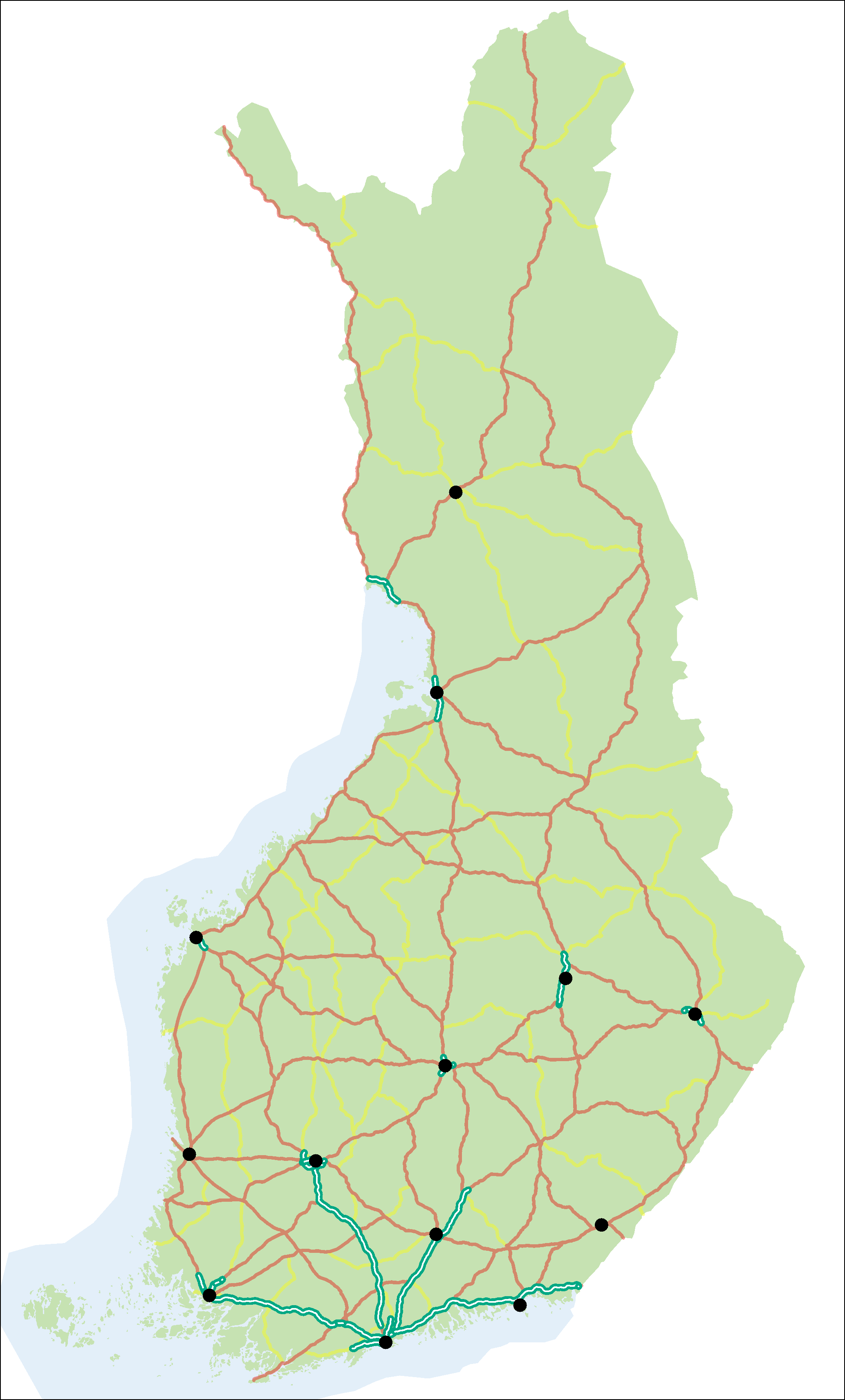
Finnish highway network Motorways (moottoritie) in green Class I highways (valtatie) in red Class II highways (kantatie) in yellow

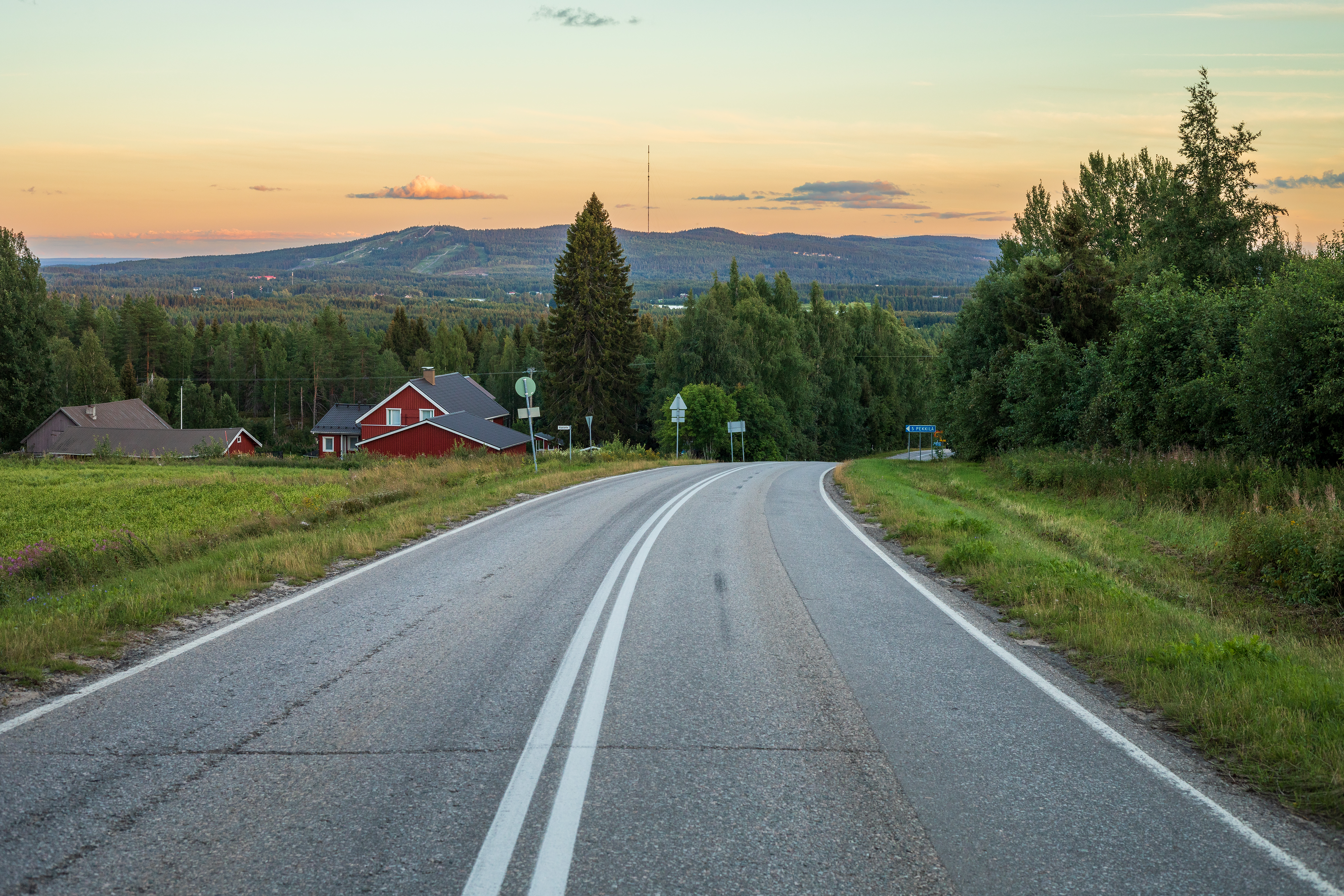
Road 9010 in Sotkamo, Finland

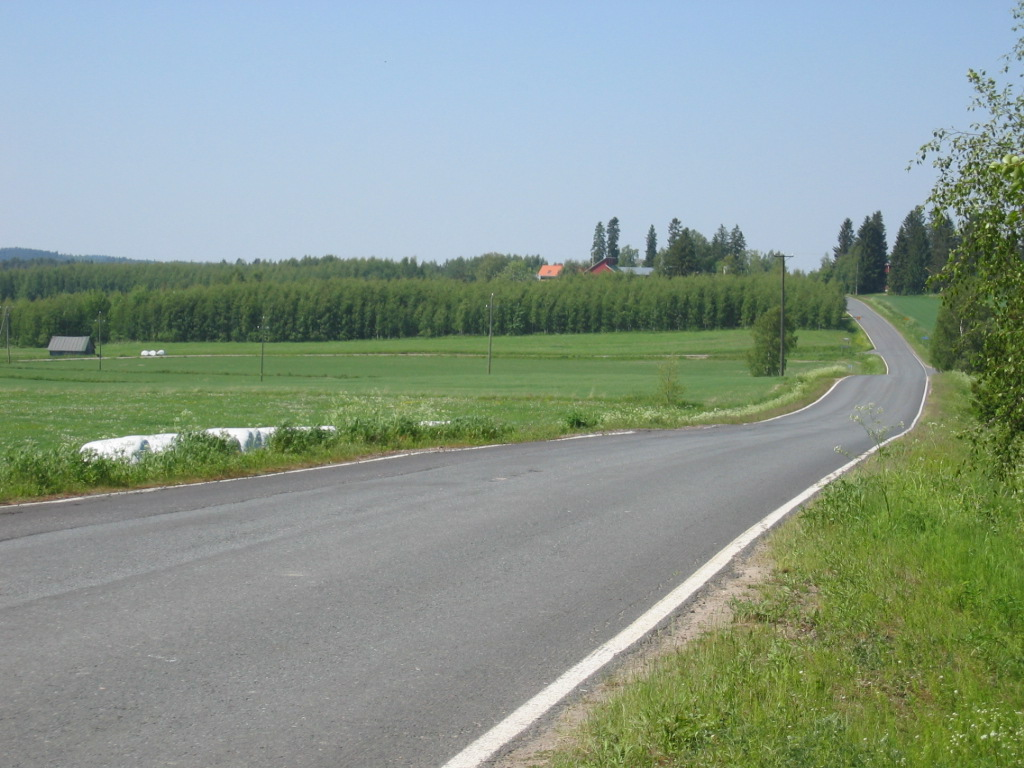
Regional road 276 in Ikaalinen

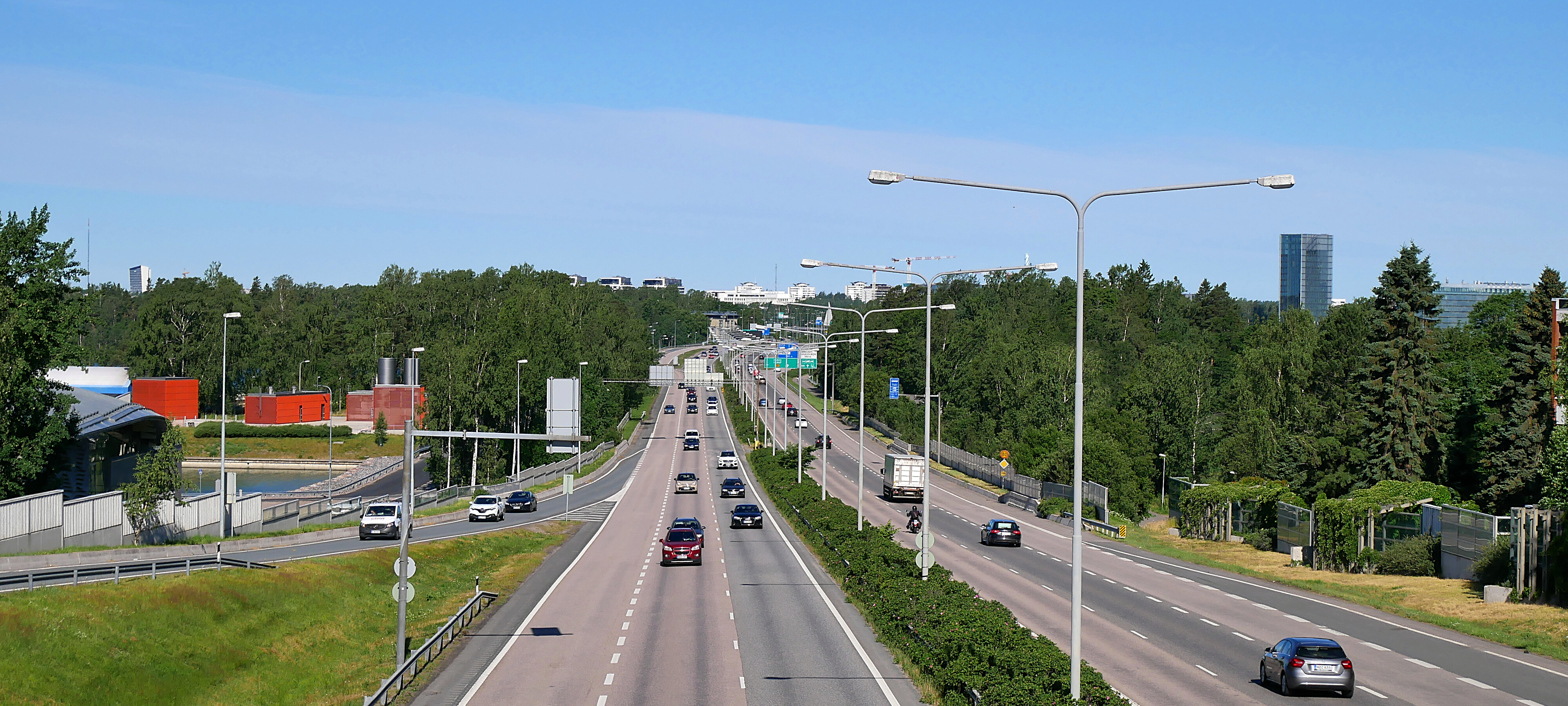
Länsiväylä freeway in the capital area.

Roads in Finland comprise 78,141 kilometres (48,555 mi) of highways, paved and gravel roads which are divided in four to five classes according to their local importance.

The total length of public roads, private and forest roads and streets in Finland is about 454,000 kilometres (282,000 mi).

== Classification of public roads ==
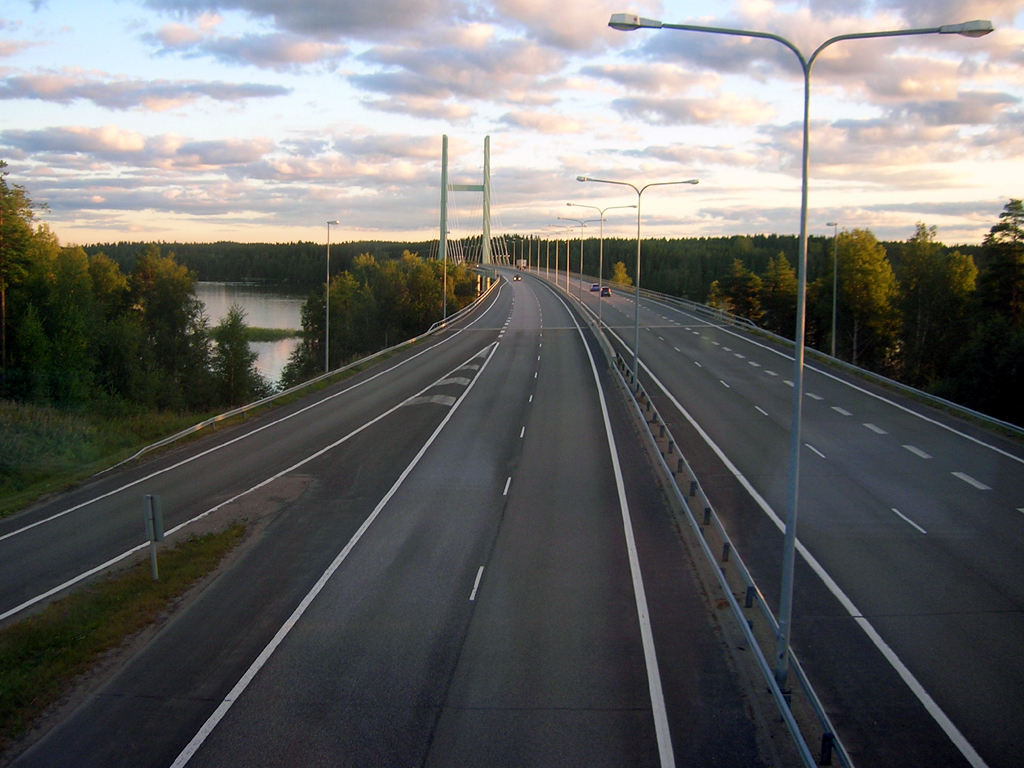
Tähtiniemi bridge on Valtatie 4 road

The classification and numbering system of state-maintained roads of Finland is as follows:

- Main roads Class I (Finnish: valtatiet; Swedish: riksvägar): 1–39 (between major cities)
- Main roads Class II (Finnish: kantatiet; Swedish: stamvägar): 40–99 (between regional centers)
- Regional roads (Finnish: seututiet; Swedish: regionalvägar): 100–999 (between large municipalities or alternate routes)
- Connecting roads (Finnish: yhdystiet; Swedish: förbindelsevägar): 1000–9999 (connecting to a larger road)
- Local roads (Finnish: paikallistiet; Swedish: bygdevägar): 11000–19999 (between villages cf. farm-to-market road)

Streets are maintained by the local municipality. Winter maintenance of roads and streets is managed by a local authority. Regional roads and connecting roads cf. county highways and roads. Main roads cf. Interstates or U.S. routes.

All main roads and almost all regional roads are paved. They are generally wider than 7 metres (23 ft). About half of the connecting and local roads are paved. They are generally narrower, and oncoming traffic is a potential hazard, despite the general speed limit of 80 kilometres per hour (50 mph). Connecting and local roads are usually not marked with numbers, but just with ordinary traffic signs.

=== Highways ===
The main highways are all paved and have at least two lanes; they are better maintained than main and regional roads. Highways numbered from 1 to 7 radiate from the capital Helsinki (Highways 2, 5 and 6 diverge from 1, 4 and 7, respectively), while highways 8 to 10 radiate from Turku on the south-western coast of Finland. Highways 11 and 12 originate in Tampere. The rest of the highways start from other major cities.

Sections of highway between major cities have often been upgraded to motorways, for example between Helsinki and Tampere. Since Finland is a large and sparsely populated country, there is no need to upgrade all highways to motorways.

== Other roads ==
Many private roads may be used by the general public, and may have different speed limits and different regulations from public roads. These are usually dead ends in the countryside. Private roads are maintained by the community using them. They may not be eligible for communal subsidies. There is about 100,000 kilometres (62,000 mi) of these servicing the inhabitants of rural areas. Cottage roads comprise about as much and forest roads about 120,000 kilometres (75,000 mi). Some of these are not public rights of way, which is usually indicated by a sign. Forest roads are not regularly maintained, nor addressed for emergency services. Some ice roads, which form seasonally, depending on temperature, are maintained by the state, the longest one being the 7 km (4 mi) Koli Ice Road, which cuts 50 km (31 mi) off the distance between Lieksa and Koli. Private ice roads are also sometimes built by the inhabitants of lakeland and archipelago.

== Controversies ==
=== Price cartel ===
Lemminkäinen and seven smaller companies were convicted of forming a price cartel to overcharge local authorities millions of euros for road paving work (asphalt). In 1999 the Supreme Administrative Court of Finland ruled that the companies colluded on prices and other matters at least between 1994 and 2002. In November 2013 the Helsinki District Court ordered the companies to pay the largest damages in Finnish legal history: 40m euros to forty Finnish municipalities.
