= Highways in Finland =

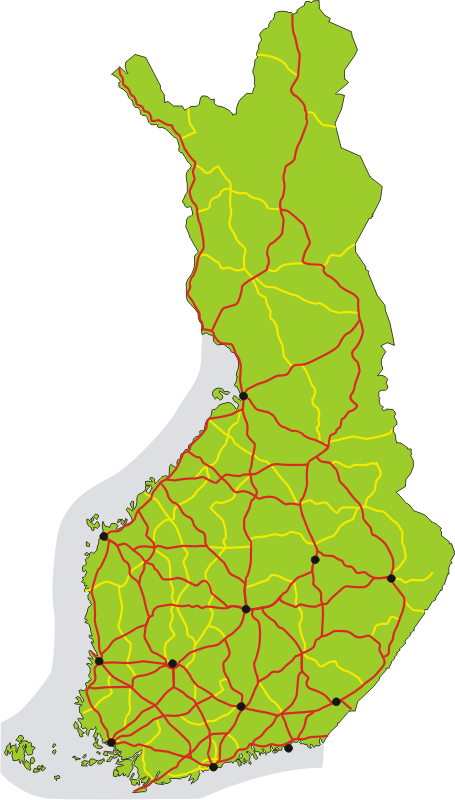
Map of highways in Finland. Class I in red, Class II in yellow.

Highways in Finland, or Main roads, comprise the highest categories of roads in Finland:

- Main roads Class I – Finnish: valtatiet; Swedish: riksvägar – numbered 1–39, between major cities
- Main roads Class II – Finnish: kantatiet; Swedish: stamvägar – numbered 40–99, between regional centers

== Network map ==
Interactive map of highways of Finland

== Overview ==
Highways numbered from 1 to 7 radiate from the capital Helsinki (Highways 2, 5 and 6 diverge from 1, 4 and 7, respectively), while highways 8 to 10 radiate from Turku on the south-western coast of Finland. Highways 11 and 12 originate in Tampere. The rest of the highways start from other major cities.

Sections of highways between major cities have often been upgraded to motorways, for example between Helsinki and Tampere. Since Finland is a large and sparsely populated country, there is no reason to upgrade all highways to motorways.

The motorway network totals 926 kilometres (575 mi). In addition to that, there are 124 kilometres (77 mi) of motortrafficways, which are reserved only for motor traffic.

== List of current highways ==
=== Class I main roads ===
Map of Finnish motorways

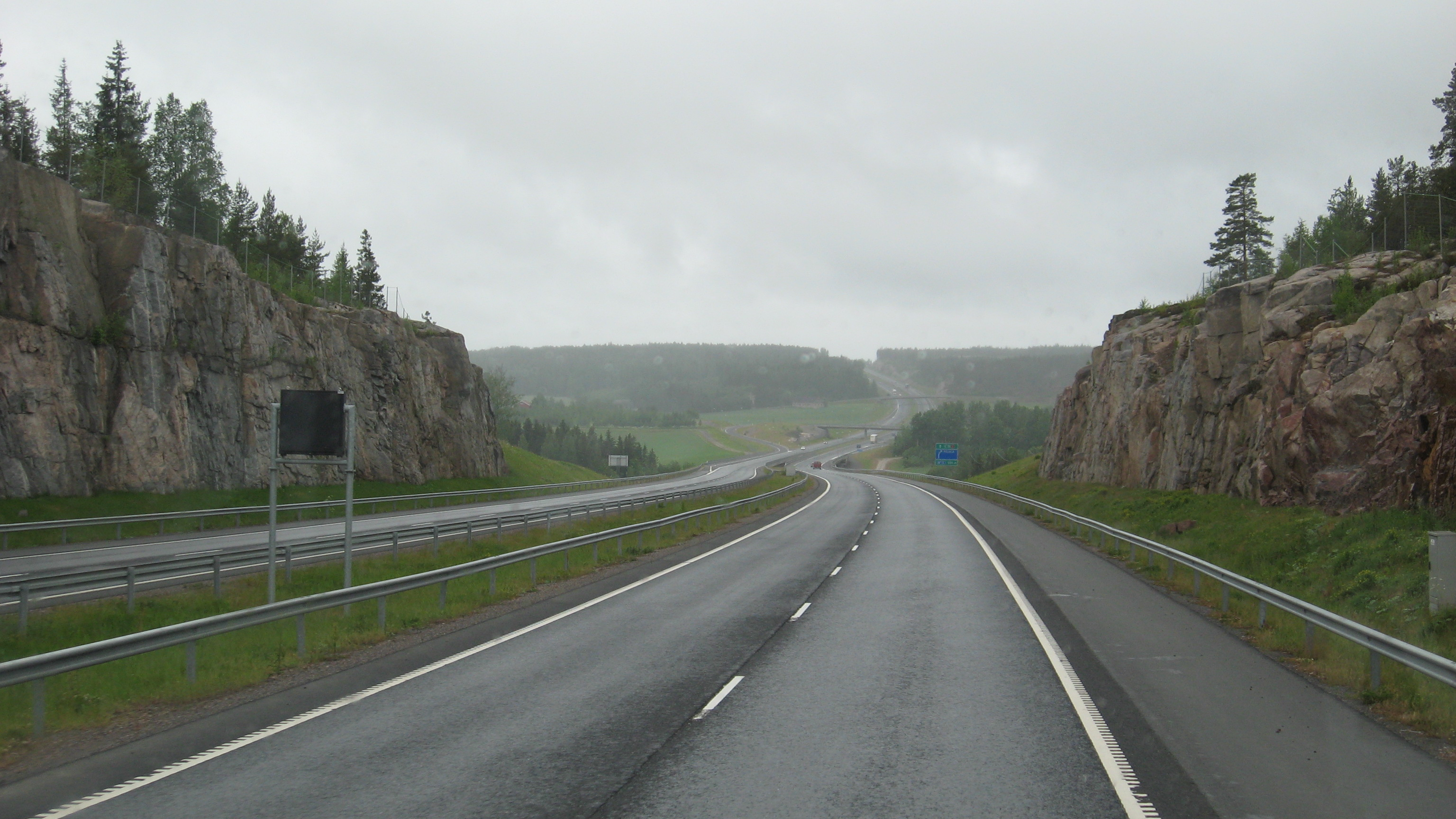
Valtatie 1 near Halikko

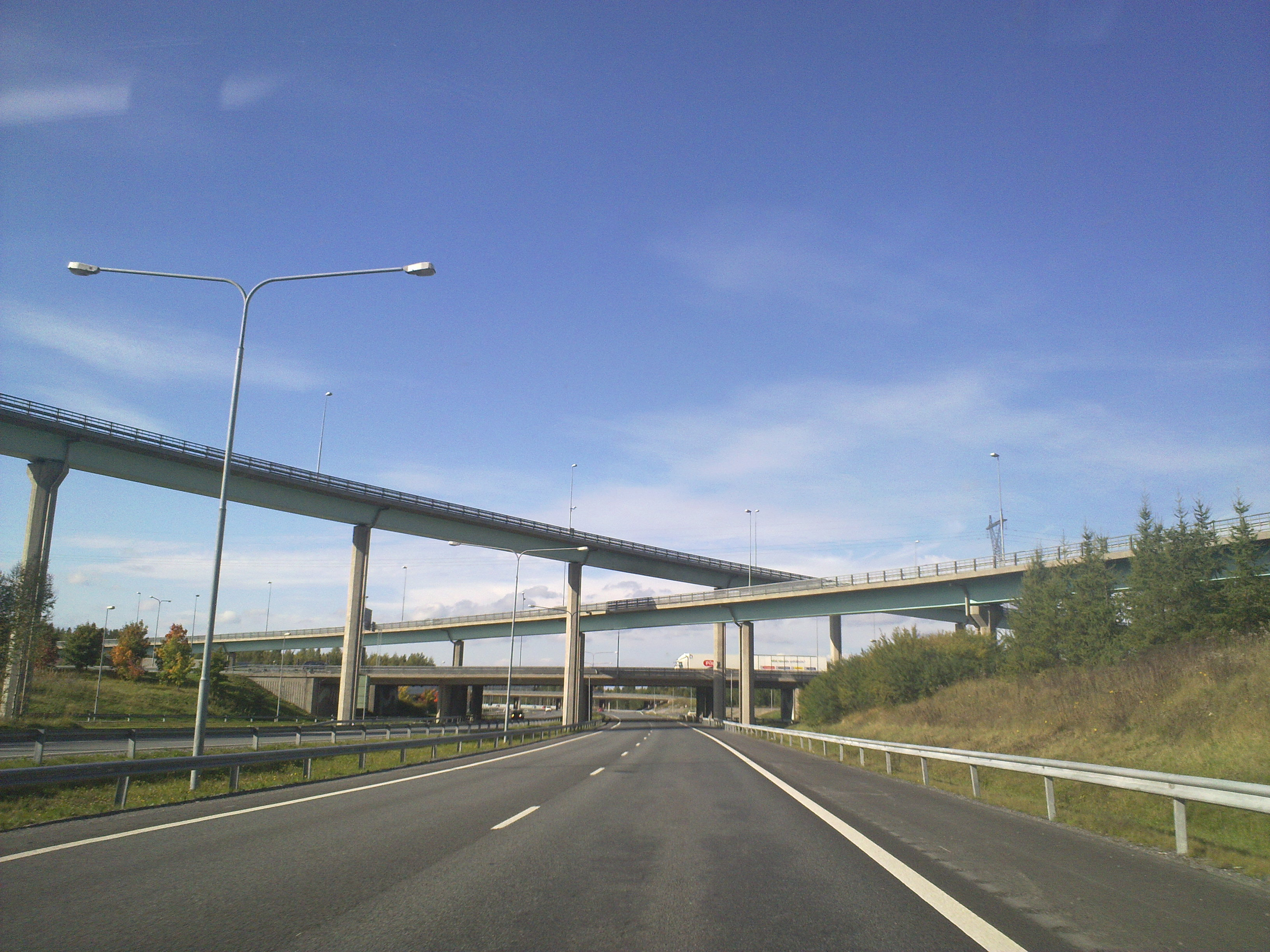
Large highway junction in Tampere

- Valtatie 1: Helsinki–Nummela–Salo–Turku

Helsinki–Turku

- Valtatie 2: Palojärvi (Vihti)–Forssa–Huittinen–Pori

Palojärvi, Vihti (1 km, connects to another motorway)

- Valtatie 3: Helsinki–Hämeenlinna–Tampere–Parkano–Jalasjärvi–Vaasa

Vantaankoski, Vantaa–Hämeenlinna–Tampere - Ylöjärvi (180 km, partially shared with valtatie 9)
Helsingby (Korsholm)–Vaasa (15 km, shared with valtatie 18 and partially shared with valtatie 8)

- Valtatie 4: Helsinki–Lahti–Heinola–Jyväskylä–Oulu–Rovaniemi–Utsjoki

Helsinki–Lahti–Lusi (140 km, partially shared with valtatie 7 and 12
Vaajakoski–Jyväskylä (6 km, shared with valtatie 9, 13 and 23)
Jyväskylä–Vehniä (19.5 km, shared with valtatie 13)
Haaransilta, Liminka–Haukipudas (43 km)
Maksniemi (Simo)–Kemi–Keminmaa (21 km)

- Valtatie 5: Heinola–Mikkeli–Kuopio–Kajaani–Kuusamo–Kemijärvi–Sodankylä

Lusi (4.3 km)
Humalajoki–Kuopio - Siilinjärvi (47 km, partially shared with valtatie 9)

- Valtatie 6: Koskenkylä (Loviisa)–Kouvola–Lappeenranta–Joensuu–Kajaani

Mansikkala–Kaukopää (Imatra) (10.4 km)
Niittylahti–Käpykangas (Joensuu) (14 km, partially shared with valtatie 9)

- Valtatie 7: Helsinki–Porvoo–Kotka–Vaalimaa (Virolahti)

Tattarisuo, Helsinki–Kotka–Vaalimaa (173 km, partially shared with valtatie 15)

- Valtatie 8: Turku–Pori–Vaasa–Nykarleby–Kokkola–Liminka

Turku–Nousiainen
Korsholm–Vaasa (shared with valtatie 3)

- Valtatie 9: Turku–Loimaa–Tampere–Jyväskylä–Kuopio–Joensuu–Tohmajärvi

Turku–Lieto
Järviö – Konho, Akaa
Konho – Lakalaiva, Tampere (shared with valtatie 3)
Lakalaiva – Atala, Tampere
Pukinniitty – Pumperi, Jyväskylä
Vaajakoski – Jyväskylä (shared with valtatie 4, 13 and 23)
Humalajoki, Kuopio–Vuorela, Siilinjärvi (part of Valtatie 5)
Ylämylly (Liperi)–Niittylahti (Joensuu) (26 km, shared with valtatie 6 and valtatie 23)

- Valtatie 10: Turku–Forssa–Hämeenlinna–Tuulos
- Valtatie 11: Nokia–Pori
- Valtatie 12: Rauma–Huittinen–Tampere–Lahti–Kouvola

Tampere–Nokia
Okeroinen – Kujala, Lahti
Kujala – Joutjärvi, Lahti (shared with Valtatie 4)

- Valtatie 13: Nuijamaa–Lappeenranta–Mikkeli–Jyväskylä–Kyyjärvi–Kokkola

Vaajakoski – Jyväskylä (shared with valtatie 4, 9 and 23)
Jyväskylä – Vehniä (shared with valtatie 4)

- Valtatie 14: Juva–Savonlinna–Punkaharju–Parikkala
- Valtatie 15: Kotka–Kouvola–Mikkeli

Kyminlinna – Rantahaka, Kotka (shared with valtatie 7)

- Valtatie 16: Ylistaro–Lapua–Kyyjärvi
- Valtatie 18: Jyväskylä–Petäjävesi–Ähtäri–Alavus–Seinäjoki–Ylistaro–Laihia–Vaasa

Helsingby, Mustasaari – Vaasa (shared with valtatie 3 and partially shared with valtatie 8)

- Valtatie 19: Jalasjärvi–Seinäjoki–Nykarleby
- Valtatie 20: Oulu–Pudasjärvi–Taivalkoski–Kuusamo
- Valtatie 21: Tornio–Pello–Muonio–Kilpisjärvi
- Valtatie 22: Oulu–Utajärvi–Kontiomäki
- Valtatie 23: Pori–Kankaanpää–Jyväskylä–Varkaus–Joensuu

Jyväskylä – Vaajakoski (shared with valtatie 4, 9, and 13)
Ylämylly, Liperi – Käpykangas, Joensuu (shared with valtatie 9)

- Valtatie 24: Lahti–Padasjoki–Jämsä
- Valtatie 25: Hanko–Lohja–Hyvinkää–Mäntsälä

Lempola, Lohja (1 km, connects to another motorway)

- Valtatie 26: Hamina–Luumäki
- Valtatie 27: Kalajoki–Ylivieska–Haapajärvi–Iisalmi
- Valtatie 28: Kokkola–Nivala–Mainua
- Valtatie 29: Tornio–Keminmaa

Tornio–Keminmaa (World's northernmost motorway)

=== Class II main roads ===
- Kantatie 40 (Turku Ring Road): Naantali–Piikkiö
- Kantatie 41: Aura–Huittinen
- Kantatie 43: Uusikaupunki–Harjavalta
- Kantatie 44: Kiikka–Kauhajoki
- Kantatie 45: Helsinki–Hyvinkää

Käpylä–Hyrylä

- Kantatie 46: Jokela–Heinola
- Kantatie 50 (Ring III): Jorvas – Salmenkallio
- Kantatie 51: Helsinki – Karis

Ruoholahti - Kirkkonummi

- Kantatie 52: Tammisaari – Jokioinen
- Kantatie 53: Tuulos – Padasjoki
- Kantatie 54: Hollola – Tammela
- Kantatie 55: Porvoo – Mäntsälä
- Kantatie 56: Jämsä – Mänttä
- Kantatie 57: Hämeenlinna – Pälkäne
- Kantatie 58: Kangasala – Kärsämäki; longest main road in Finland
- Kantatie 62: Mikkeli – Imatra
- Kantatie 63: Kauhava – Ylivieska
- Kantatie 65: Tampere – Virrat
- Kantatie 66: Orivesi – Lapua
- Kantatie 67: Kaskinen – Seinäjoki
- Kantatie 68: Virrat – Pietarsaari
- Kantatie 69: Äänekoski (Hirvaskangas) – Suonenjoki (Levä)
- Kantatie 71: Kerimäki – Kitee
- Kantatie 72: Mikkeli – Pieksämäki – Suonenjoki
- Kantatie 73: Kontiolahti – Lieksa – Nurmes
- Kantatie 74: Joensuu – Ilomantsi
- Kantatie 75: Siilinjärvi – Nurmes – Kuhmo
- Kantatie 76: Sotkamo – Kuhmo
- Kantatie 77: Siilinjärvi – Viitasaari – Kyyjärvi
- Kantatie 78: Paltamo – Pudasjärvi – Rovaniemi
- Kantatie 79: Rovaniemi – Kittila – Muonio
- Kantatie 80: Sodankylä – Kittilä – Kolari
- Kantatie 81: Rovaniemi – Posio – Kuusamo
- Kantatie 82: Vikajärvi – Kemijärvi – Salla
- Kantatie 83: Sinettä – Pello
- Kantatie 86: Eskola – Ylivieska – Liminka
- Kantatie 87: Iisalmi – Nurmes
- Kantatie 88: Raahe – Pulkkila – Iisalmi
- Kantatie 89: Paltamo – Russian border in Vartius
- Kantatie 91: Ivalo – Russian border in Raja-Jooseppi
- Kantatie 92: Karigasniemi – Kaamanen – Norwegian border in Näätämö
- Kantatie 93: Palojoensuu – Hetta – Norwegian border near Kivilompolo
- Kantatie 98: Aavasaksa – Swedish border; shortest main road in Finland

=== Former highway alignments ===
The former routes of the following highways differ significantly from the current ones, or have been completely abolished.

==== Class I roads ====
- Valtatie 2: Nummi–Somero–Loimaa–Huittinen
- Valtatie 3 (Note: The current road section between Klaukkala and Loppi is now known as regional road 132.): Klaukkala–Loppi–Janakkala–Hämeenlinna–Pälkäne–Tampere
- Valtatie 4: Helsinki–Hyvinkää– Padasjoki–Jyväskylä, Lahti–Padasjoki, Ivalo–Petsamo, Kaamanen–Karigasniemi
- Valtatie 6: Imatra–Sortavala; abandoned after WWII when Karelia was ceded to the Soviet Union
- Valtatie 7: Vaalimaa–Viipuri (now Vyborg); abandoned after WWII when Karelia was ceded to the Soviet Union
- Valtatie 9: Aura–Huittinen–Tampere–Kangasala–Orivesi
- Valtatie 13: Lappee–Viipuri (now Vyborg); abandoned after WWII when Karelia was ceded to the Soviet Union
- Valtatie 14: Parikkala–Viipuri (now Vyborg); abandoned after WWII when Karelia was ceded to the Soviet Union
- Valtatie 15: Viipuri (now Vyborg)–Rajajoki (now Sestra); abandoned after WWII when Karelia was ceded to the Soviet Union
- Valtatie 17: Kuopio–Joensuu, merged into Valtatie 9 in 2010
- Valtatie 18 (1938): Sortavala–Joensuu - Kajaani; Sortavala - Joensuu abandoned after WWII when Karelia was ceded to the Soviet Union; remainder became a portion of Valtatie 6 in 1996
- Valtatie 19: Iisalmi–Pulkkila; became Kantatie 88 in 1996

==== Class II roads ====
- Kantatie 41: Huittinen – Tampere; became a portion of Valtatie 12 in 1996
- Kantatie 42: Rauma–Huittinen; became a portion of Valtatie 12 in 1996
- Kantatie 45: Ylöjärvi – Alasjärvi; renumbered to Kantatie 60 in 1996
- Kantatie 53 (1938): Hanko - Mäntsälä; redesignated as Valtatie 25 in 1996, number reused on Tuulos - Padasjoki
- Kantatie 55: Mäntsälä – Hämeenlinna; now connecting road 1471 and regional road 290
- Kantatie 56 (1938): Hämeenlinna – Toijala – Tampere; became regional roads 130, 303 and 190 in 1996; number reused on Jämsä - Mänttä
- Kantatie 57 (1938): Huittinen – Toijala; became connecting road 2847 and regional roads 230 and 284 in 1972 due to rerouting of Valtatie 2 and Valtatie 9; number reused on Hämeenlinna - Pälkäne
- Kantatie 58 (1938): Lahti – Padasjoki; now part of Valtatie 24
- Kantatie 59: Lusi – Kanavuori; became a portion of Valtatie 4 in 1996
- Kantatie 60 (1938): Hamina - Sippola - Kouvola; now regional roads 371 and 353 and connecting road 3593
- Kantatie 60 (1960s): Kotka - Kouvola; now part of Valtatie 15
- Kantatie 60 (1976): Heinola - Kouvola; now Kantatie 46
- Kantatie 60 (1996): Ylöjärvi – Alasjärvi; became portions of Valtatie 3 and Valtatie 9 in 2011
- Kantatie 61 (1938): Viipuri (now Vyborg) – Lahdenpohja; abandoned after WWII when Karelia was ceded to the Soviet Union
- Kantatie 61 (1950s): Hamina - Taavetti; redesignated to Kantatie 26 in 1996
- Kantatie 62: Viipuri (now Vyborg) – Metsäpirtti (now Zaporozhskoye); abandoned after WWII when Karelia was ceded to the Soviet Union; number reused on Mikkeli - Imatra
- Kantatie 63: Viipuri (now Vyborg) – Kyyrölä (now Krasnoselskoye) – Kivennava – Terijoki (now Zelenogorsk); abandoned after WWII when Karelia was ceded to the Soviet Union
- Kantatie 64 (1938): Viipuri (now Vyborg) – Kolvisto – Terijoki (now Zelenogorsk); abandoned after WWII when Karelia was ceded to the Soviet Union
- Kantatie 64 (1970s): Jalasjärvi – Seinäjoki – Ylistaro; renumbered to Valtatie 19 and Valtatie 18 in 1996
- Kantatie 65: Pori – Parkano – Jyväskylä; now part of Valtatie 23
- Kantatie 67: Seinäjoki – Nykarleby; now part of Valtatie 19
- Kantatie 68 (1938): Koivulahti – Ylihärmä; became regional road 725 at the turn of the 1970s and 1980s; number reused on Virro - Pietarsaari
- Kantatie 69: Jyväskylä– Laukaa; now regional road 637
- Kantatie 70 (1938): Joensuu – Varkaus; became a portion of Valtatie 23 at the turn of the 1970s and 1980s
- Kantatie 70 (1996): Onkamo – Niirala; formerly a portion of Valtatie 18 (later road 490), became a portion of Valkatie 9 in 2010
- Kantatie 71: Kitee – Tohmajärvi
- Kantatie 72 (1938): Sortavala – Salmi; abandoned after WWII when Karelia was ceded to the Soviet Union
- Kantatie 73 (1938): Sortavala – Suojärvi; abandoned after WWII when Karelia was ceded to the Soviet Union
- Kantatie 77 (1938): Oulu – Kajaani; redesignated to Valtatie 22 in the 1970s; number reused on Kyyjärvi - Siilinjärvi
- Kantatie 80 (1938): Rovaniemi (Vikajärvi) – Kemijärvi; redesignated to Kantatie 82 in 1996; number reused on Sodankylä - Kolari
- Kantatie 82: Kelloselkä – Kuolajärvi; abandoned after WWII when Karelia was ceded to the Soviet Union
- Kantatie 85: Kokkola – Kajaani; redesignated as Valtatie 28 in 1996
- Kantatie 87: Kalajoki – Iisalmi; became a portion of Valtatie 27 in 1996

== Rings ==
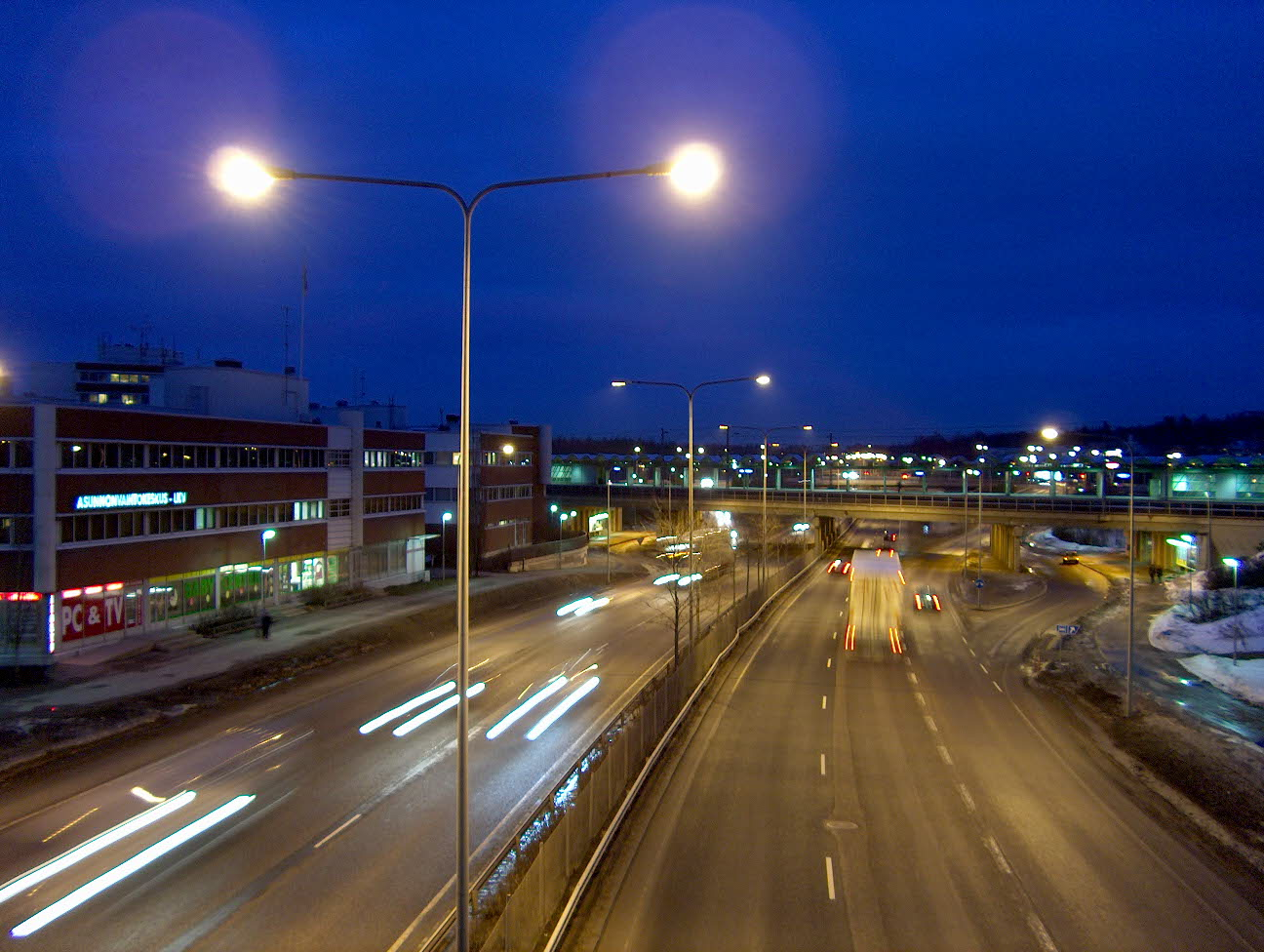
Ring I (Kehä I) in Pukinmäki, a northern district of Helsinki

- Ring I
- Ring II
- Ring III
- Tampere Ring Road
- Turku Ring Road

== Highways in Åland ==
- Åland Highway 1
- Åland Highway 2
- Åland Highway 3
- Åland Highway 4

== See also ==
- Roads in Finland
- Road signs in Finland
