= Finnish national road 26 =

Road in Finland

National Road 26
- Valtatie 26 (Finnish); Riksväg 26 (Swedish)
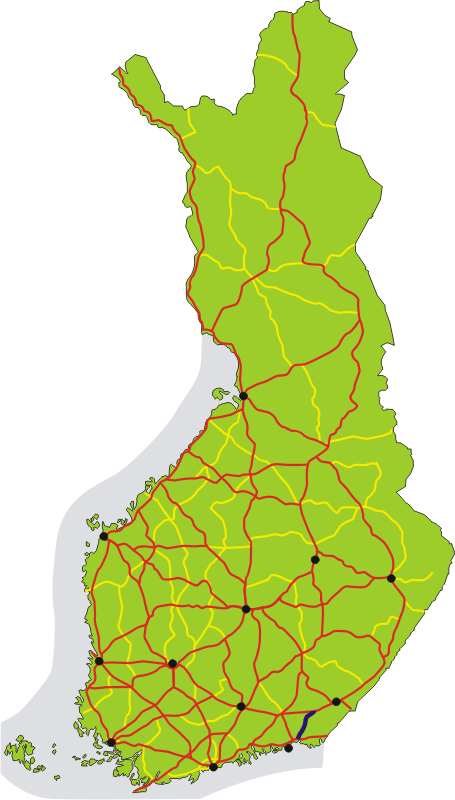

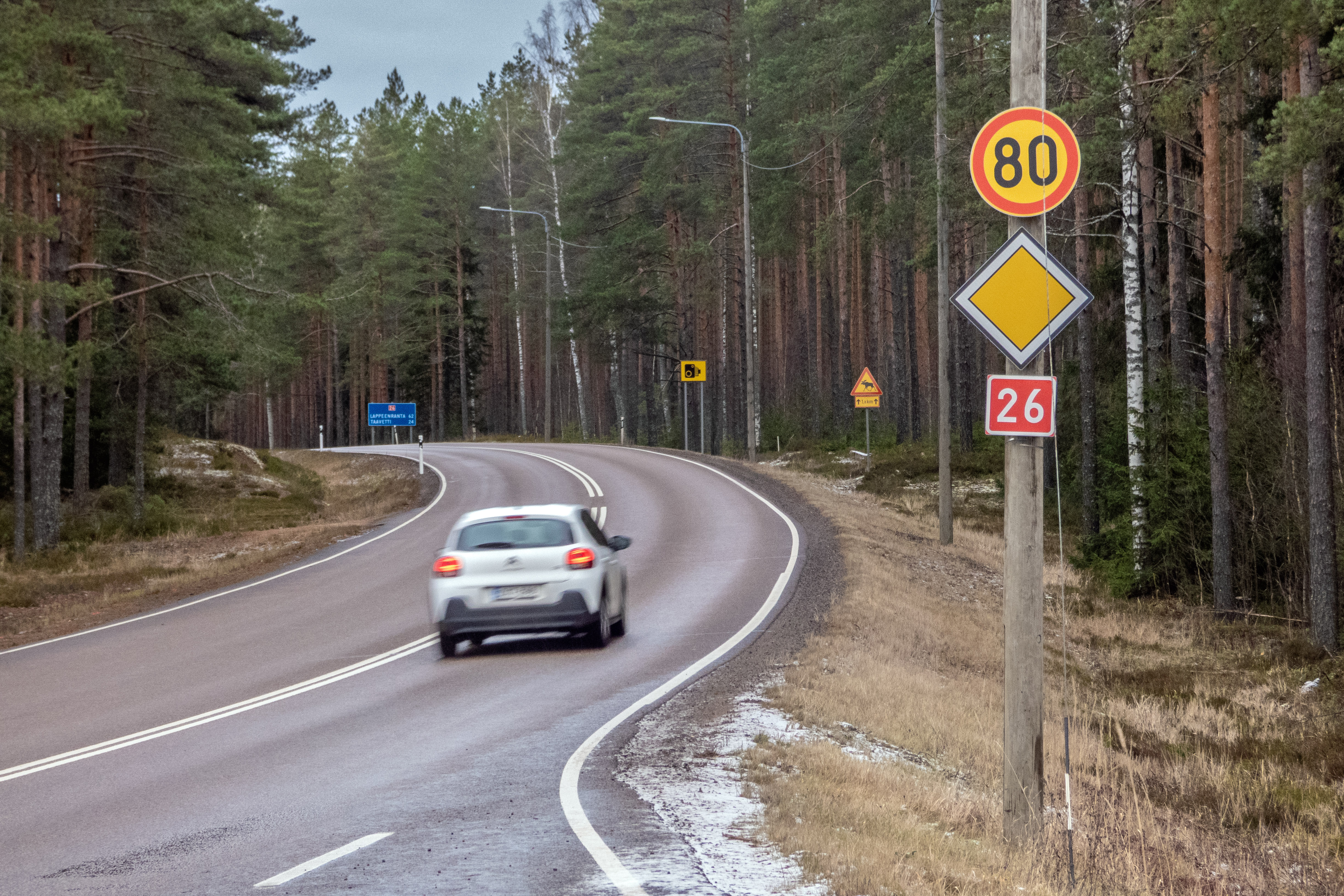

Route information
- Maintained by the Finnish Transport Agency
- Length: 46 km (29 mi)

Major junctions
- From: Vt 7 in Husula, Hamina
- To: Vt 6 in Taavetti, Luumäki

Location
- Country: Finland

Highway system
- Highways in Finland

The Finnish national road 26 (Finnish: Valtatie 26) is the main route between Hamina and Luumäki in southern Finland. It runs from the Highway 7 (E18) in the Husula district of Hamina to the Highway 6 near Taavetti, the municipal centre of Luumäki. The road also runs briefly through the Kouvola area.

The road between Hamina and Taavetti was built in the 1950s to replace road connections left in areas ceded during the Moscow Armistice. In connection with the construction of the Hamina bypass road, which is part of Highway 7, the beginning of Highway 26 was moved to Husula, approximately four kilometers north of the previous starting point in Summa.

In the summer of 2017, the road was completely resurfaced, and in the summer of 2018, two kilometer-long overtaking lanes were built on the road. The road is planned to be improved in several stages by 2030, including by widening the road, building bypasses around settlements, building bypass lanes, and improving junctions, pedestrian and cycling conditions, groundwater protection, and noise abatement. The cost estimate for the entire project at the June 2005 cost level is €49 million.
