= Finnish national road 11 =

Road in Finland

National Road 11
- Valtatie 11 (Finnish); Riksväg 11 (Swedish)
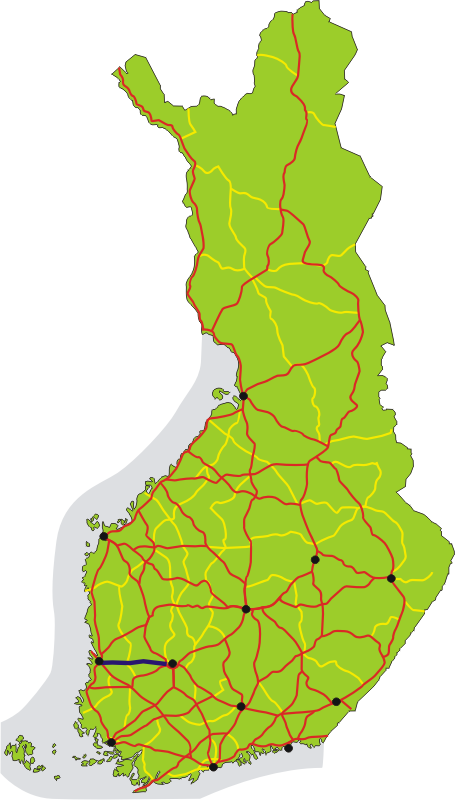

Route information
- Maintained by the Finnish Transport Agency
- Length: 101 km (63 mi)
- Existed: 1938–present

Major junctions
- From: Nokia
- To: Pori

Location
- Country: Finland

Highway system
- Highways in Finland
← Vt 10	→ Vt 12

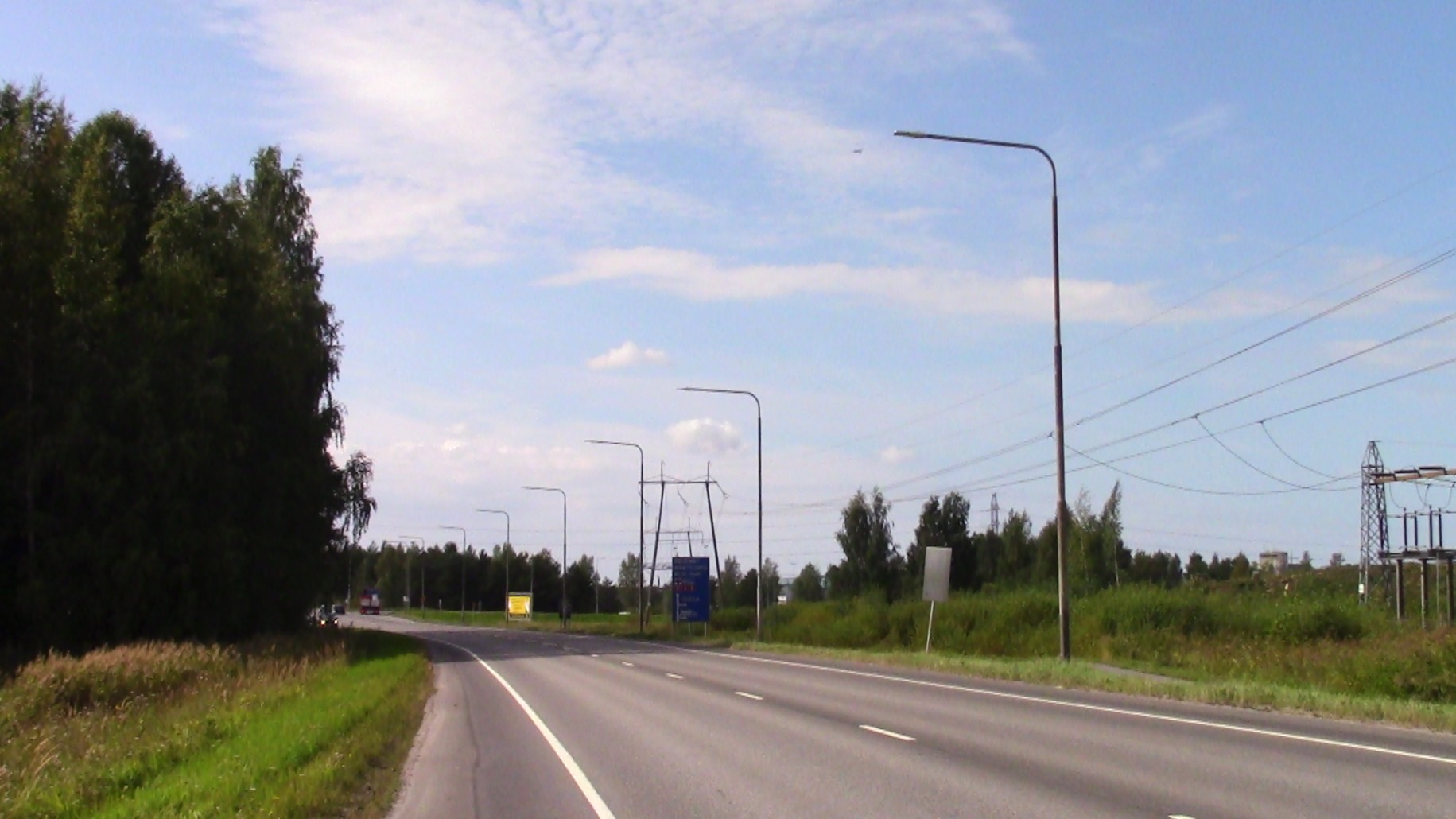
A highway in Pori

Finnish national road 11 (Finnish: valtatie 11, Swedish: riksväg 11) is an east–west highway from Nokia of Pirkanmaa to Pori of Satakunta. The road is relatively short, only 101 kilometers, in addition to which the road as a whole is two-lane. Nonetheless, a highway is an important route used by industrial transportation.

The road passes through the following municipalities: Nokia - Sastamala - Kokemäki - Ulvila - Pori. Since the Sastamala and Kiikoinen joined together in 2013, this is currently the only highway in Finland that runs entirely in the territory of the municipalities using the town or city title.

The Finnish Transport Infrastructure Agency and the City of Pori plan to continue Highway 11 from their current terminus, the interchange of Highway 2, south of Pori Airport, to Highway 8, where a new interchange would be built.

== History ==
In the 1938 numbering system, national road 11 ran from Tampere to Pori. At that time, the route was quite winding as it ran along national road 9 to the center of Nokia and continued on via Siuro in Nokia along the current road 2505 to Salmi. At Salmi the highways split and national road 11 continued along current regional road 259 through Mouhijärvi, Suodenniemi and Lavia, then along current regional road 257 and road 2550 to Kullaa and via Ruosniemi to Pori.

In the 1996 numbering reform, the section from Tampere to Nokia became a portion of national road 12.

== Sources ==
- Autoilijan tiekartta 2007. AffectoGenimap Finland Oy, 2006. ISBN 978-951-593-047-7.
- "020202 – Kartat" (in Finnish). Fonecta. 2007.
- "Eniro Kartat ja reitit" (in Finnish). Eniro.
- "Google Maps" (in Finnish). Google Maps. 2007.
- Grönroos, Matti. "Valtatie 11 Nokia–Pori, 97 km" (in Finnish).
