= Turku Ring Road =

Road in Finland

Highway 40
- Kantatie 40 (Finnish); Stamväg 40 (Swedish)
- Turku Ring Road
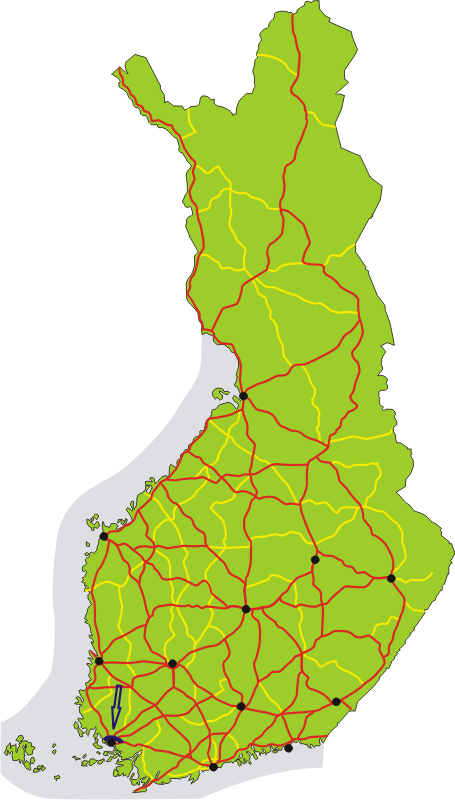

Route information
- Part of E18
- Length: 34 km (21 mi)
- Existed: 1960–present

Major junctions
- From: Naantali
- To: Piikkiö

Location
- Country: Finland
- Major cities: Raisio, Turku, and Lieto

Highway system
- Highways in Finland

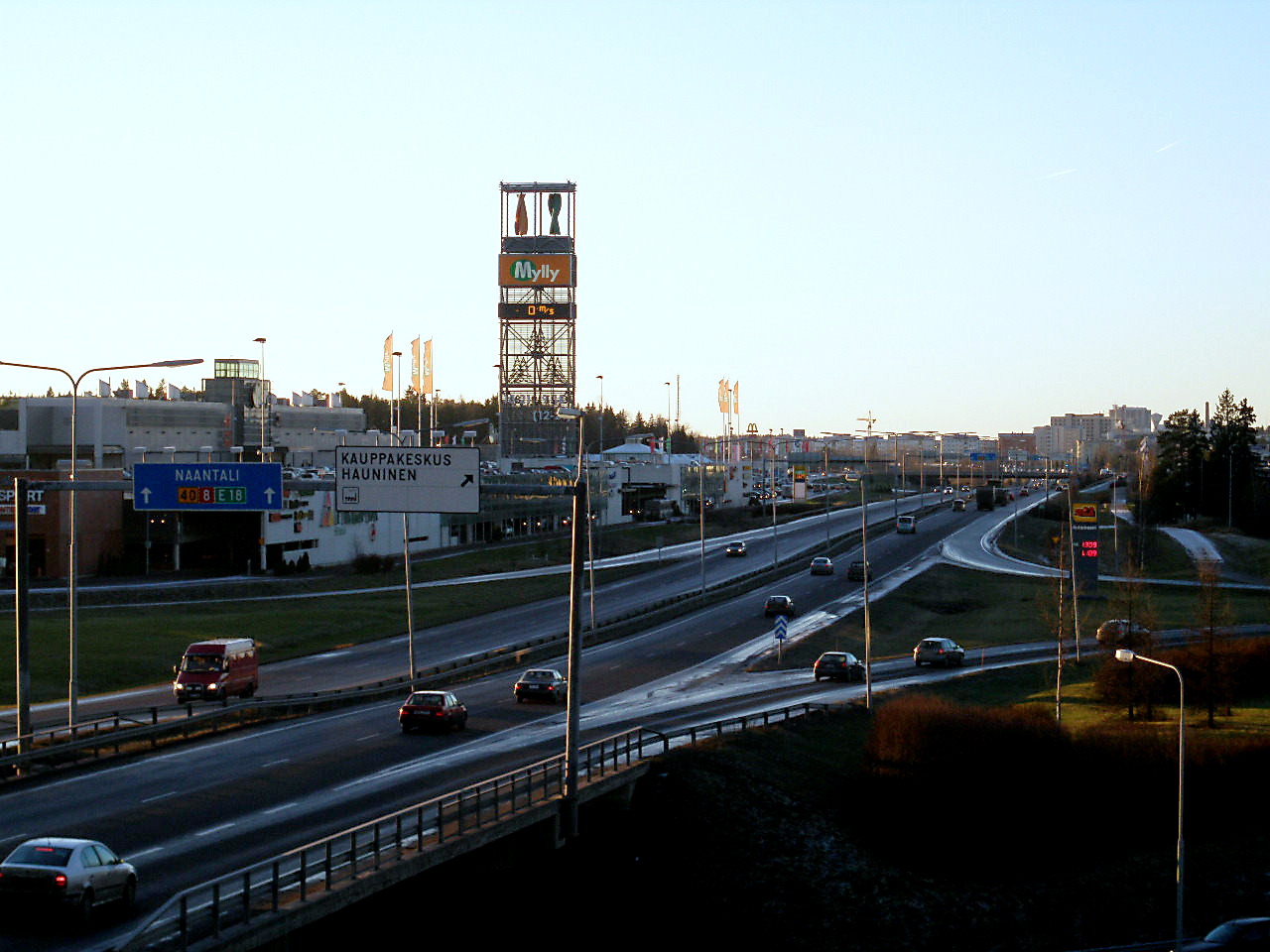
Mylly shopping mall in Raisio

The Turku Ring Road (Finnish: Turun kehätie, Swedish: Åbo ringväg) or Finnish National Road 40 (Finnish: Kantatie 40, Swedish: Stamväg 40) is a ring road of Turku, Finland. It leads from Naantali to Piikkiö in Kaarina, passing by Raisio, Turku, and Lieto.

== Overview ==
The Turku Ring Road has businesses and markets alongside, including Biltema, IKEA, the Mylly shopping mall, and several other retail parks. Turku Ring Road is connected to Turku Airport via European route E63 to Tampere, and is part of European route E18 from Naantali and Turku to Helsinki.

== History ==
The first section of the Turku bypass between Raisio and Auranlaakso, between national roads 8 and 10, was completed as a two-lane road in 1960 and the section from Auranlaakso to national road 1 in Piikkiö was completed in 1963. The route was designated as main road 40 in 1970. The road was extended from Raisio to Naantali in 1989. The section from Raisio to Auranlaakso was also widened to dual carriageway. The section between Raisio city center and Kuninkoja was completed in 1993 with the remainder completed in 1995. The section from Auranlaakso to Piikkiö was widened to dual carriageway at the end of November 2022. At that time, the section of main road 40 from the Kirismäki junction eastwards was redesignated to access road 2271.

== See also ==
- Highways in Finland
