= Oskari Herttua =

Finnish farmer, business executive and politician (1876–1953)

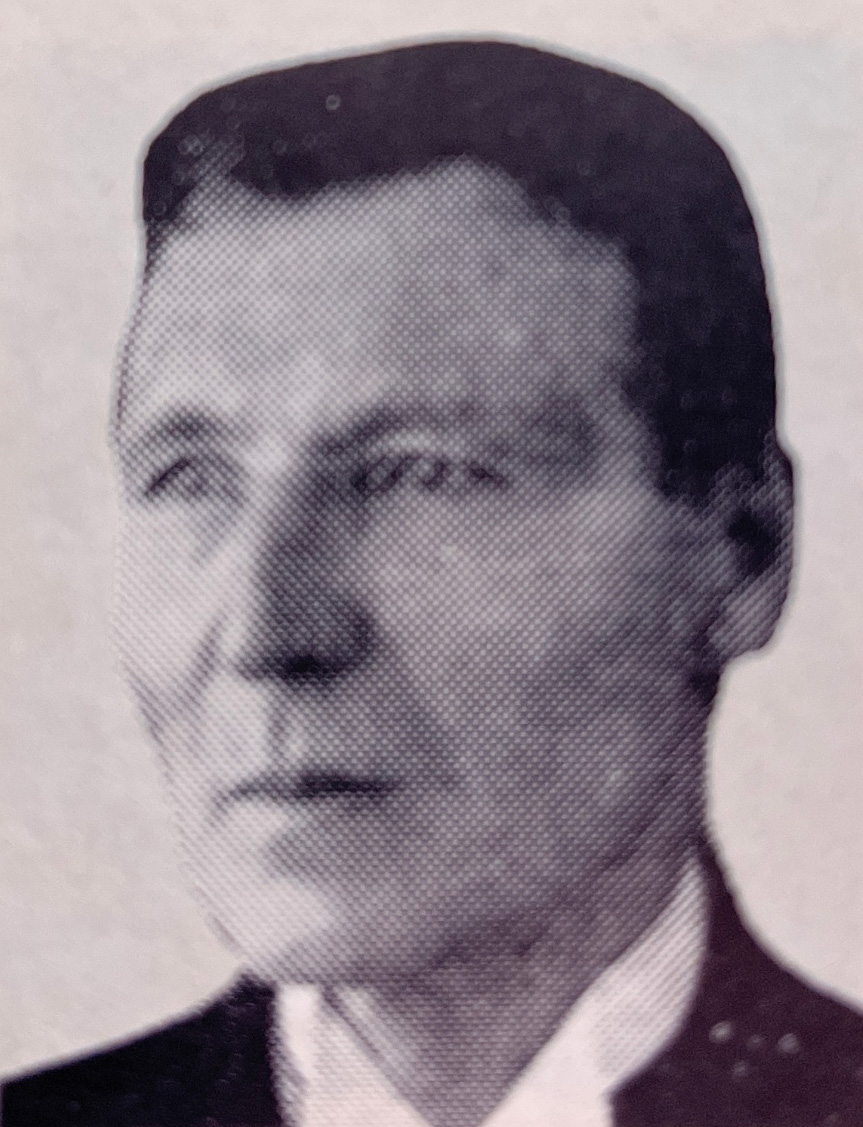
Oskari Herttua

Oskari Mikko (Mikko Oskari) Herttua (23 April 1876 – 4 October 1953) was a Finnish farmer, business executive and politician, born in Ylistaro. He was a member of the Parliament of Finland from 1911 to 1913, representing the Finnish Party. After the Finnish Party ceased to exist in December 1918, Herttua joined the National Coalition Party.
