= Finnish national road 19 =

Road in Finland

National Road 19
- Valtatie 19 (Finnish); Riksväg 19 (Swedish)
- Valtatie 19, Riksväg 19
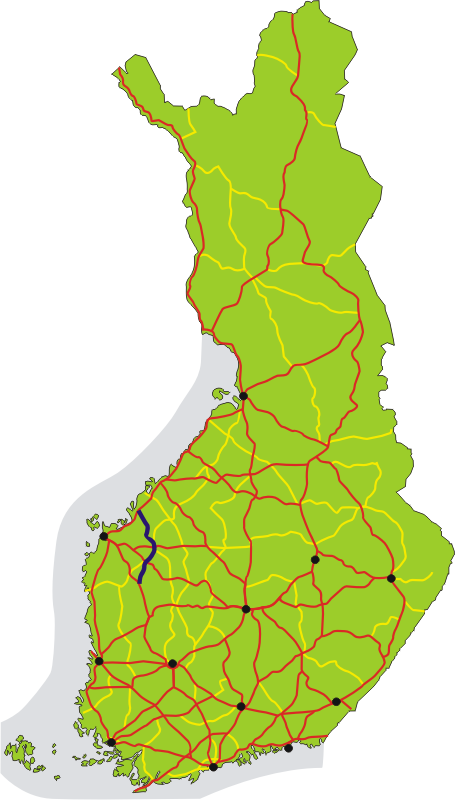

Route information
- Maintained by the Finnish Transport Agency
- Length: 121.4 km (75.4 mi)
- Existed: 1996–present

Major junctions
- North end: Vt 8 in Nykarleby
- South end: Vt 3 in Kurikka

Location
- Country: Finland
- Major cities: Seinäjoki

Highway system
- Highways in Finland
← Vt 18	→ Vt 20

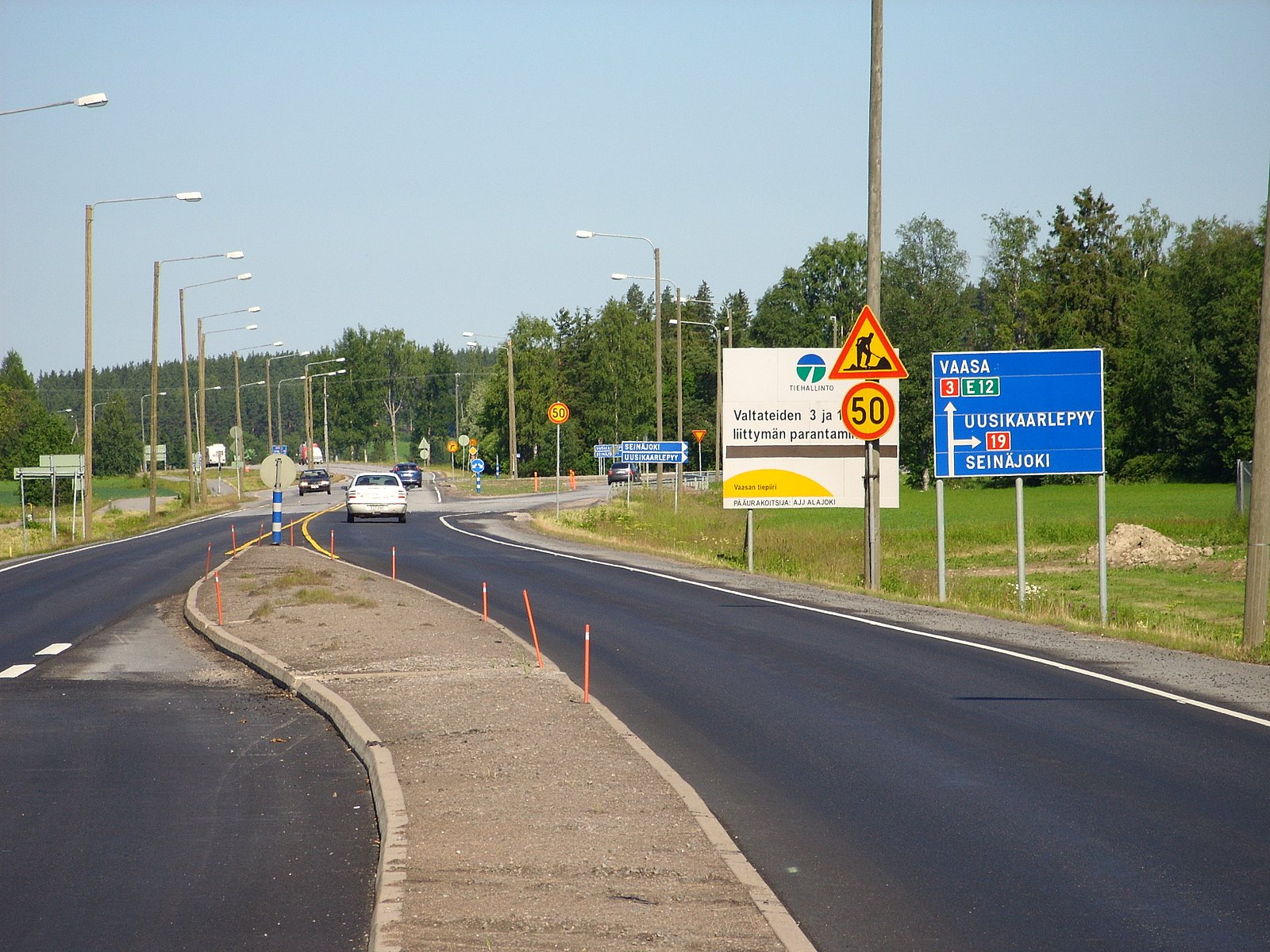
Intersection of Highway 3 and Highway 19 in Kurikka's Jalasjärvi

Finnish national road 19 (Finnish: valtatie 19, Swedish: riksväg 19) is the Finnish highway leading from Kurikka, via Seinäjoki to Nykarleby. The length of the road is 121,4 kilometers. The road is a major transport intermediary in South and Central Ostrobothnia. The road belongs to the main roads defined by the Ministry of Transport and Communications. The road is mainly a good quality two-lane highway.

Highway 19 passes through the following municipalities: Kurikka–Ilmajoki–Seinäjoki–Lapua–Kauhava–Nykarleby. It starts at Kurikka's Jalasjärvi, where it diverges from Highway 3 (E12). The road runs in the area of Ilmajoki municipality and then past the city of Seinäjoki. From Seinäjoki, the road continues through the municipalities of Lapua and Kauhava to Ytterjeppo, Nykarleby, where it joins Highway 8 (E8). An eastern bypass was built from the road, which opened to traffic in November 2015 and facilitated better access from Seinäjoki to the south.

A popular PowerPark amusement park is located along the highway in Alahärmä, Kauhava.

== History ==
Before 1996, Highway 19 was the road between Iisalmi and Pulkkila (now part of Siikalatva). The current highway 19 was part of main road 64 between Jalasjärvi and Seinäjoki and main road 67 between Seinäjoki and Nykarleby. In the 1996 renumbering, highway 19 was moved to its current route and the road between Iisalmi and Pulkkila became part of main road 88. At the same time, main road 64 was completely decommissioned and main road 67 was shortened to run between Seinäjoki and Kaskinen.

== Sources ==
- Autoilijan tiekartta 2007. AffectoGenimap Finland Oy, 2006. ISBN 978-951-593-047-7.
- "020202 – Kartat" (in Finnish). Fonecta. 2007.
- "Eniro Kartat ja reitit" (in Finnish). Eniro.
- "Google Maps" (in Finnish). Google Maps. 2007.
