= Vantaa incinerator =

Incinerator near Helsinki, Finland

Coordinates: 60°15′38″N 025°07′40″E

The Vantaa incinerator is an incinerator power plant taken to use in Vantaa, Finland, on 17 September 2014. It is operated by Vantaan Energia. It is the largest incinerator in Finland, and it cost 300 million Euros to build. It is located immediately to the northeast of the intersection of the Finnish national road 7 and the Ring III bypass road.

The construction of the plant began in the autumn of 2011, the cornerstone was laid in May 2012, and trial runs of the plant began in March 2014, when the first batches of waste were burned.

The waste burned in the incinerator is collected from the Uusimaa Province, from an area that extends from Hanko to Porvoo and from Helsinki to Nurmijärvi. The plant receives between 100 and 150 loads of waste every day. They are delivered to it by HSY (‘Helsinki area environmental services’) from the metropolitan area and by Rosk’n Roll Oy from Uusimaa.

The plant has two incinerators, which can burn up to 400 cubic metres of waste per second, that is, a volume equivalent to that of a single family house every 5 seconds. There is also a storage space called a bunker that can store the waste produced by 1.5 million people in a space of 10 days. The plant makes it possible to make better use of mixed waste, as 320 000 tons of mixed waste no longer ends up in landfills but is used to produce heat and electricity for the city of Vantaa instead.

The waste is burned in a grate, which according to Vantaan Energia is a reliable technique and the most common incineration technique used for burning waste in the world. In addition, natural gas is used as fuel, and it is said that it contributes to the energy efficiency of the plant.

The plant produces 920 gigawatt-hours of district heat per year, which is nearly half of what the city of Vantaa needs, and 600 gigawatt-hours of electricity, which is 30% of what Vantaa needs per year. The use of the plant means that Vantaa will use almost one third less of fossil fuel and its carbon dioxide emissions decrease by 20%. The waste is burned in a temperature of nearly 1000 °C, which eliminates most of the toxic compounds. Around 700 tons of various materials are extracted from the flue gas every year, mostly heavy metals, which are disposed of by a company called Ekokem in Riihimäki. The slag is taken to the Ämmässuo landfill site, and the gravellike bottom slag is used in earthworks. A further use for the ashes is being investigated.
