= Kuoppala =

Kuoppala is a Finnish surname. Notable people with the surname include:

- Alexander Kuoppala (born 1974), Finnish musician
- Hanna Kuoppala (born 1975), Finnish ice hockey player
- Ida Kuoppala (born 2000), Finnish ice hockey player
- Jussi Kuoppala (born 1974), Finnish footballer
