= Jussi Kuoppala =

Finnish footballer (born 1974)

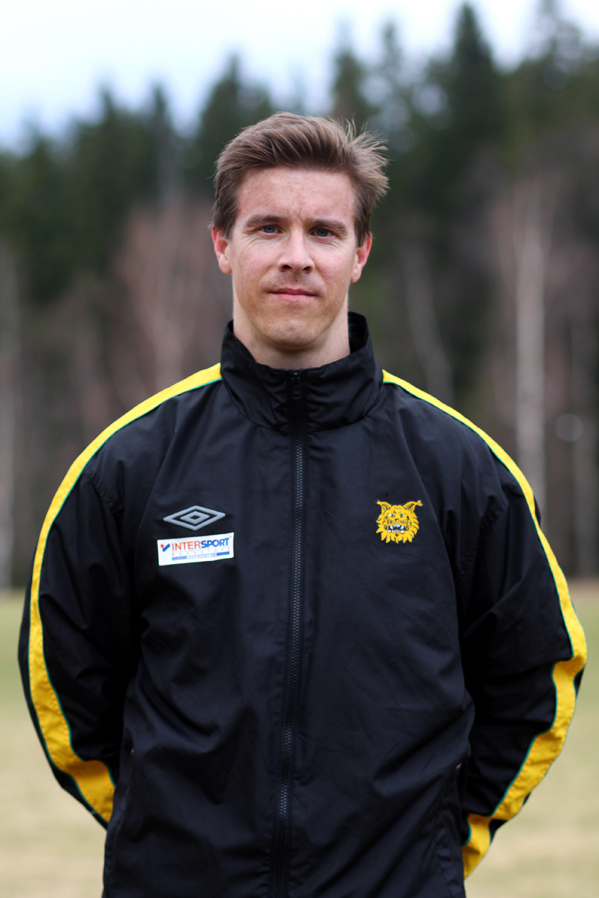

Jussi Kuoppala (born 28 June 1974 in Ylistaro) is a Finnish former footballer who played as a defender. He represented Tampere United in the Finnish premier division Veikkausliiga. At the premier level he has also represented his youth club FC Ilves. He has played in a total of 236 matches scoring three goals.
