= Tampere Ring Road =

Highway in the Pirkanmaa region, Finland

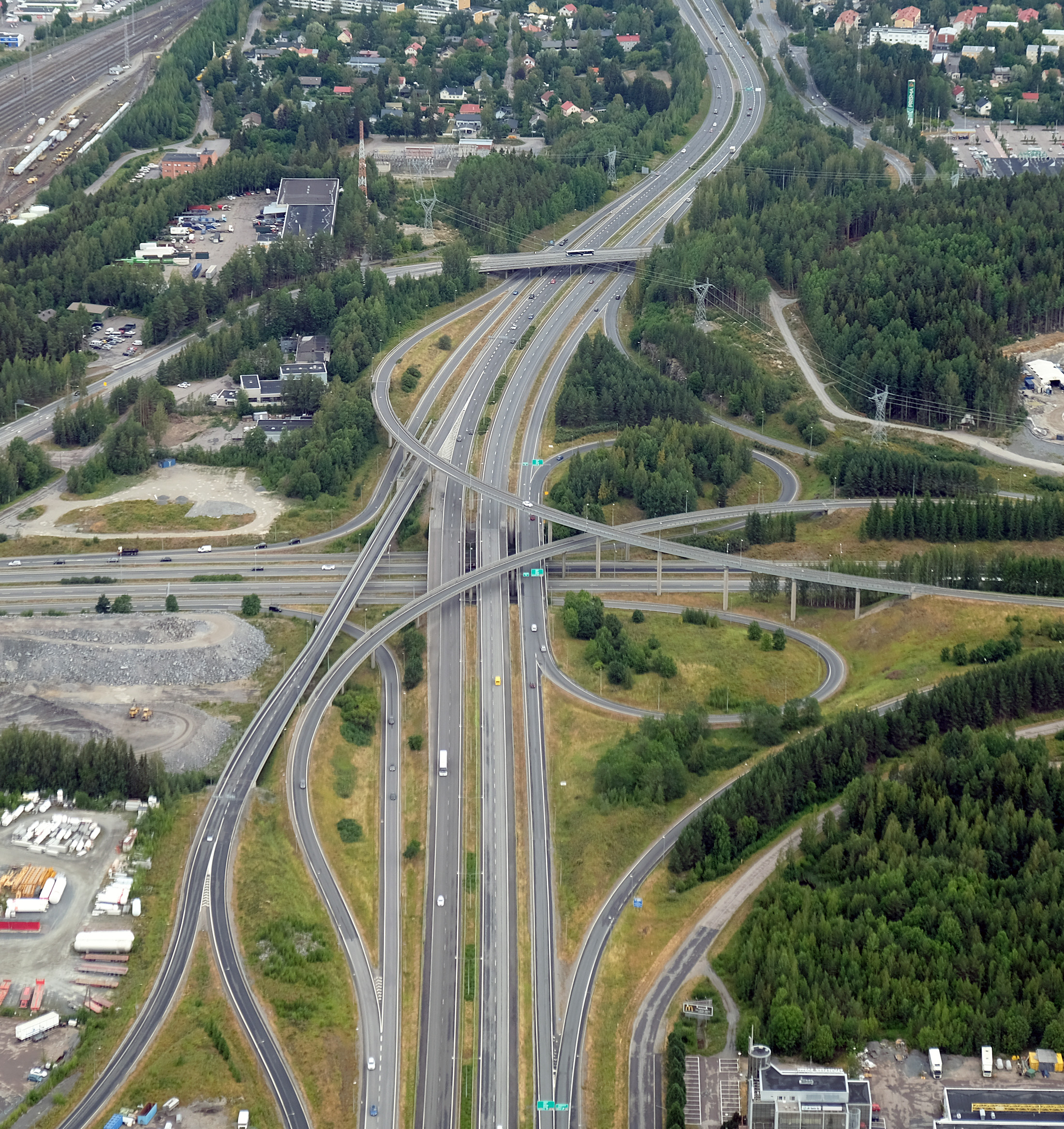
Lakalaiva interchange in the Tampere Ring Road between the highway 3 (E12) and highway 9 (E63)

The Tampere Ring Road (Finnish: Tampereen kehätie) or former Finnish National Road 60 (Finnish: Kantatie 60) is a ring road in the Tampere metropolitan area, Finland. It runs (from west to east) from Ylöjärvi to Tampere, passing through Nokia and Pirkkala. Its western part is part of Highway 3 (between Helsinki and Vaasa), while its eastern part is part of Highway 9 (between Turku and Tohmajärvi).

The ring road has been a motorway along its entire length since 2009. The main section of the ring road is used by more than 50,000 vehicles per day. According to the ELY Centre of Pirkanmaa, the western part of the ring road is the busiest road in Finland, excluding the motorway and ring road connections in the Helsinki metropolitan area.

== History ==
The oldest part of the Tampere Ring Road is the Rajasalmi (old) bridge, completed in 1973. The western section was completed around the turn of the 1970s and 1980s. The road was originally a motorway between Lakalaiva and Rajaniemi and a regular two-lane road between Rajaniemi and Ylöjärvi. After the western section was completed, national roads 3 and 9 continued to run through the center of Tampere, and the ring road was numbered main road 45.

The eastern section was completed in 1994, and has been a motorway since its creation. After the eastern section was completed, the entire route was renumbered to main road 60 (the main road 45 designation was reused elsewhere), and national roads 3 and 9 were rerouted onto the ring road.

in autumn 2006, the motorway section between Rajaniemi and Kalku was completed on the western part of the ring road. At the same time, the new bridges at Rajasalmi were completed, and the old bridge remained to serve local traffic. The remaining sections of the ring road were completed as motorways in 2008, when the sections between Lakalaiva and Rajaniemi and Kalku and Soppeenmäki were opened. The cost of the entire improvement project was 114 million euros and was implemented by Destia.

The number 60 had previously been used on two other roads. In the 1938 numbering system, main road 60 ran from Hamina to Kouvola via Liikkala and Myllykoski. When the section from Kouvola to Mikkeli was completed in the 1970s, this and all of main road 60 was renumbered to national road 15 and the number was moved to the route between Voikkaa in Kuusankoski and Heinola. This became main road 46 when the main road 60 number was moved to the Tampere Ring Road. Main road 60 was cancelled in 2011.

== See also ==
- Highways in Finland
