= Mylly =

Shopping centre in Raisio, Finland

Coordinates: 60°29′27″N 022°12′4″E

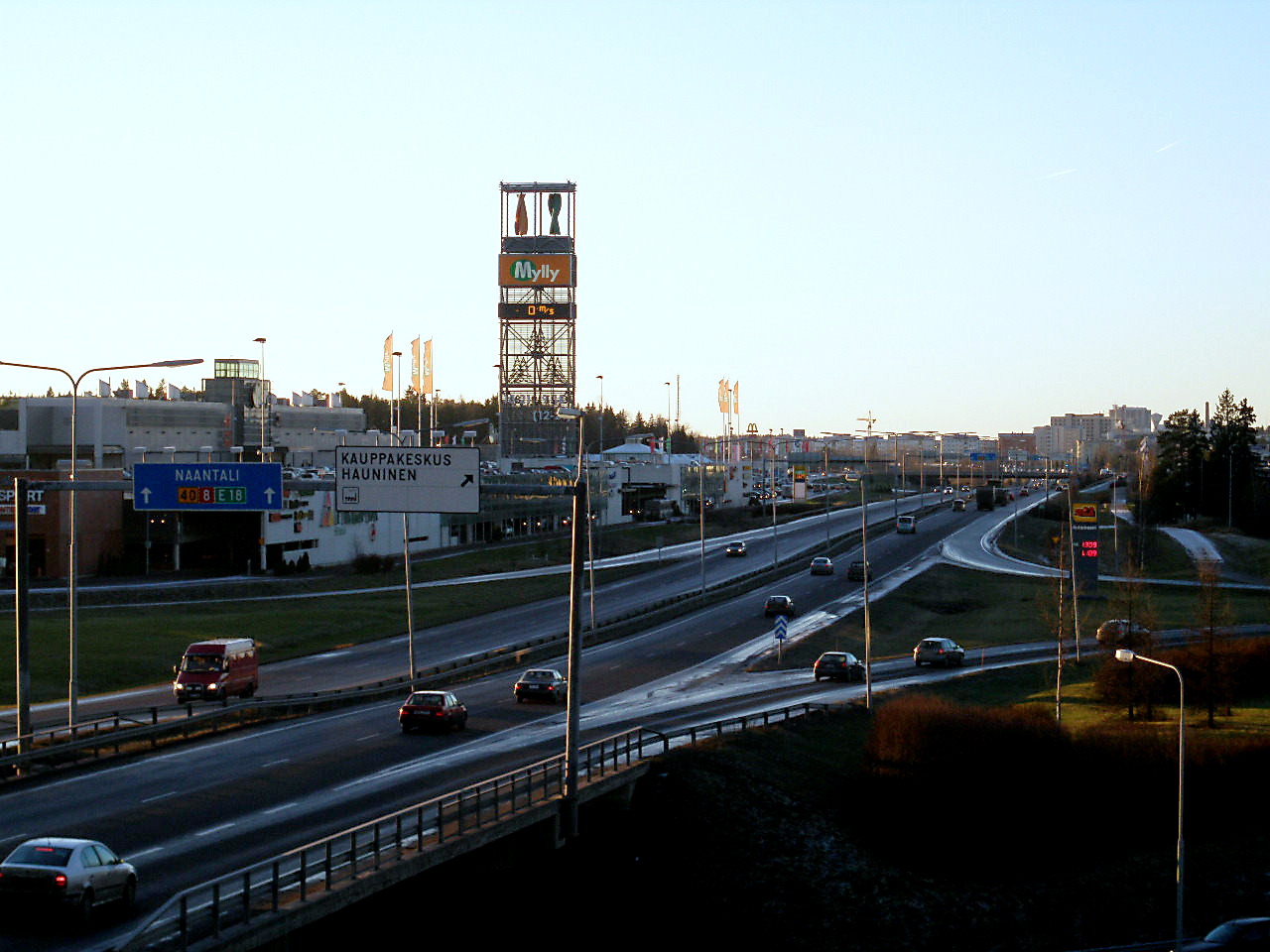
Turku Ring Road (E18) and the Mylly shopping centre in Raisio

Mylly (lit. mill) is a shopping centre in Raisio, Finland. The shopping centre has bit over a hundred shops, banks, and other services on an area of around 83,000 square metres (890,000 sq ft), and is as such the largest shopping centre in the Turku region and fourth largest in Finland outside the Helsinki region. Mylly was opened in October 2001 and in 2008 the annual sales was 167 million euros.

The shopping centre was expanded in 2016, adding an additional section containing a number of businesses.
