= Finnish national road 29 =

Road in Lapland region, Finland

National Road 29
- Valtatie 29 (Finnish); Riksväg 29 (Swedish)
- Valtatie 29, Riksväg 29
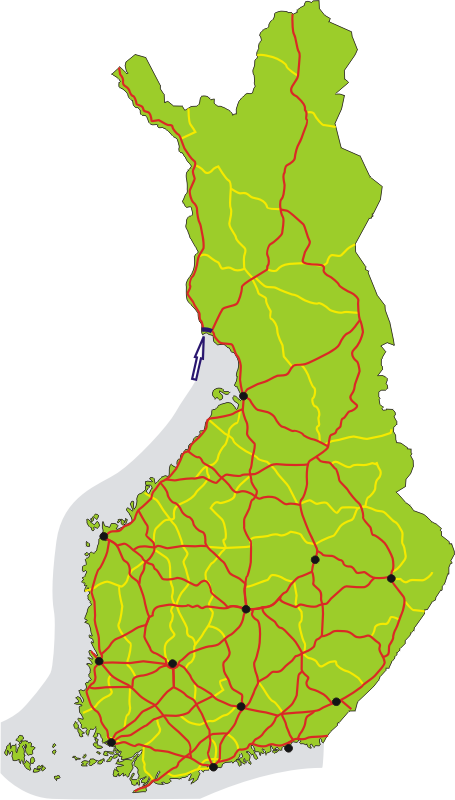

Route information
- Part of E4 / E8
- Maintained by the Finnish Transport Agency
- Length: 16 km (9.9 mi)
- Existed: 2001–present

Major junctions
- West end: Swedish border in Tornio
- East end: Vt 4 in Keminmaa

Location
- Country: Finland

Highway system
- Highways in Finland

Finnish national road 29 (Finnish: Valtatie 29; Swedish: Riksväg 29) is a highway in Finland between Keminmaa and Tornio. The road is part of the European route E8, except for the one kilometer section between the national boundary and the intersection with highway 21, where the road is part of the European route E4.

== Overview ==
The highway is 16 kilometres (10 mi) long. The eastern 14 kilometer section of the road is part of a motorway called Perämerentie (which in English translates roughly to "The road of Bothnian bay"), and is the northernmost motorway/freeway in the world with Alaska Highway 3 in Fairbanks, Alaska being the second northernmost. Although there are some grade separated roads built closely to motorway standards even further north, such as the Rovaniemi bypass in Finnish highway 4, they aren't signed as motorways.

Finnish national road 29 was the first highway in Finland to be dual carriageway for its whole length.

== Detailed route ==
The road begins from the national boundary of Finland and Sweden, between the towns of Tornio (Finland) and Haparanda (Sweden). Road bypasses the town center of Tornio at its southern edge and then crosses the Torne river as a four lane road with at-grade junctions.

Right after the bridge the road intersects with the highway 21 at a grade separated junction. After the junction with the highway 21 the road continues as a four lane road with at-grade intersections for about 2 kilometers to the roundabout junction with regional route 922.

After the roundabout the road continues as a grade separated motorway with speed limit of 120 km/h for 14 kilometers until it terminates in Keminmaa at Kallinkangas junction with highway 4, where the motorway continues as highway 4 to the south towards the town of Kemi.
