= Finnish national road 1 =

Road in Finland

National Road 1
- Valtatie 1 (Finnish); Riksväg 1 (Swedish)
- Ykköstie, Tarvontie, Turunväylä
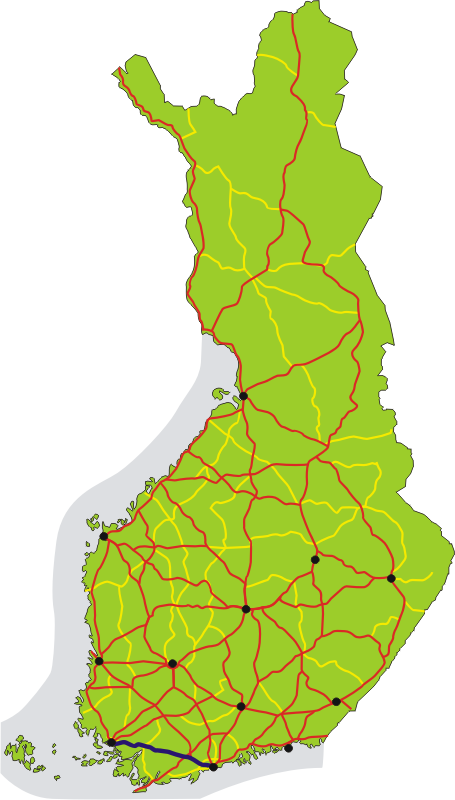

Route information
- Part of E18
- Maintained by the Finnish Transport Agency
- Length: 165.2 km (102.7 mi)
- Existed: 1938–present

Major junctions
- West end: Vt 9 in Turku
- East end: Munkkiniemi, Helsinki

Location
- Country: Finland
- Major cities: Espoo, Lohja, Salo

Highway system
- Highways in Finland
← Vt 29	→ Vt 2

The Finnish national road 1 (Finnish: Valtatie 1 or Finnish: Ykköstie; Swedish: Riksväg 1) is the main route between the major cities of Helsinki and Turku in southern Finland. It runs from Munkkiniemi in Helsinki to the VI District of Turku, and is part of the European route E18. The road is a motorway for its whole length.

== History ==
In the 1938 numbering system, the road between Helsinki and Turku was designated Highway 1. The construction of Highway 1 was one of the earliest highway projects in Finland, with construction beginning in the 1930s and completed in stages by 1951. Although modern for its time, the road's performance and safety deteriorated as traffic volumes increased and before the motorway sections were built, Highway 1 was winding, hilly and congested. The hills proved to be a problem, especially with heavy traffic, for which separate crawling lanes were built in the 1960s and 1970s. However, the ends of these lanes proved to be accident-prone, when heavy traffic merged with other traffic. The crawling lanes were converted into passing lanes in the 1980s, but accidents continued. Highway 1 also ran through the center of Salo until the late 1970s, when a bypass was built on a budget that bypassed Salo to the north, but this ran through a built-up area and capacity was limited due to several traffic lights.

Between 1956 and 2009, a motorway was built in stages between Helsinki and Turku. The first portion of the motorway between central Helsinki and Gumböle in Espoo was completed in December 1962. The highway was extended to Veikkola in 1967 and to Lohjanharju in 1971. The section at the end of Turku from Turku to Paimio was completed in stages in the 1990s and from Paimio past Salo to Muurla in 2003. The last section, from Lohjanharju to Muurla, ran through demanding terrain and was completed last. The section from Muurla to Lahnajärvi was completed in late 2008. The final section between Lahnajärvi and Lohja was completed in January 2009. This part of motorway contains five tunnels totaling 5.2 kilometres (3.2 mi). The longest tunnel (2,230 m or 7,320 ft, double-bore) is also the second longest road tunnel in Finland. As the various motorway sections were completed, the old road remained as a parallel road, originally numbered road 118. In the mid-1990s numbering reform, the numbering of the parallel roads was "standardized", and the route was changed to regional road 110.

== Route ==
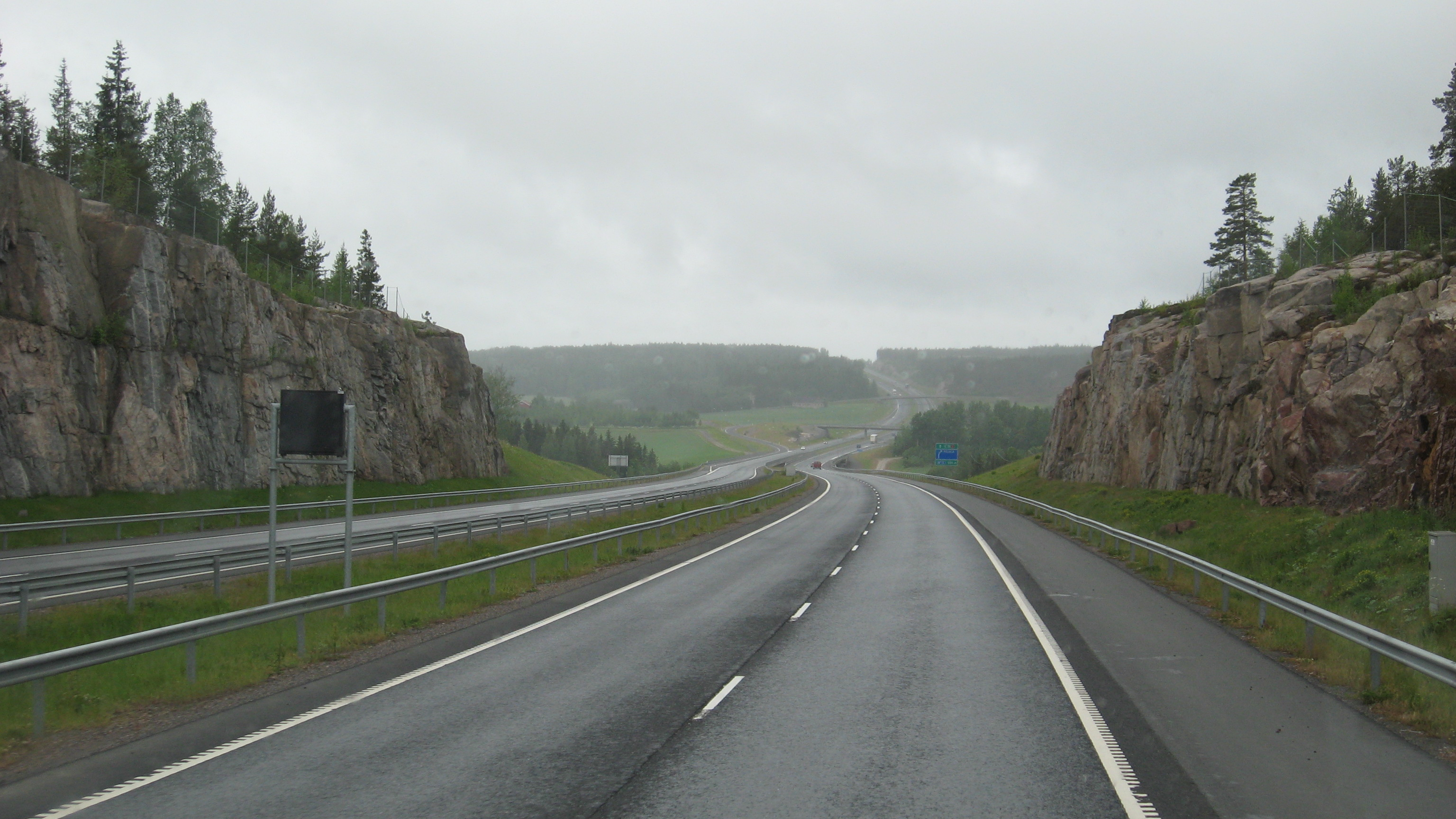
National road 1

The road passes through the following localities:

- Helsinki
- Espoo
- Kirkkonummi (Veikkola)
- Vihti
- Lohja
- Salo
- Paimio
- Kaarina
- Turku

== See also ==
- Highways in Finland
- Turuntie
- Åland Islands Highway 1
