= Taavetti =

- Village
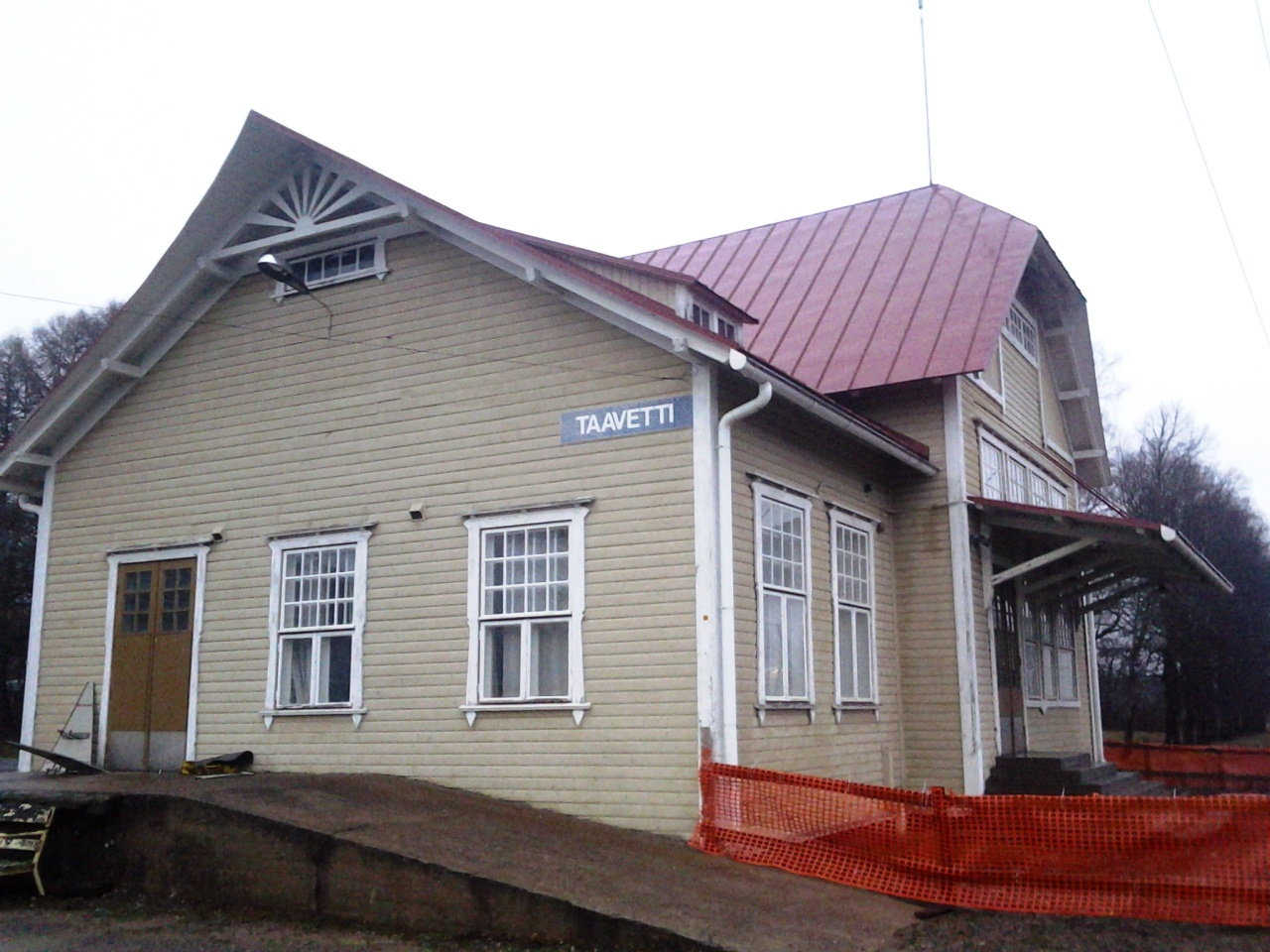
- Taavetti railway station

- Location in Finland Taavetti (Finland)
- Country: Finland
- Region: South Karelia
- Municipality: Luumäki

Population (2018-12-31)
  - Total: 2,084
- Time zone: UTC+2 (EET)
  - Summer (DST): UTC+3 (EEST)
- Postal code: 54500

Taavetti (Finnish pronunciation: [ˈtɑːʋetːi]; Swedish: Taavetti, also Davidstad) is a village and administrative center of the Luumäki municipality in South Karelia, Finland. It has a population of 2,084. It is located along Highway 6 between Lappeenranta and Kouvola, and its center also runs on Highway 26 towards Hamina. The distance from Taavetti to the nearest city, Lappeenranta, is about 40 kilometres (25 mi).

Taavetti has evolved around the Taavetti Fortress (Taavetin linnoitus). The fortress is part of a chain of fortresses built in the late 18th century to protect St. Petersburg. The village of Marttila at the crossroads of the main roads was once chosen as the location for the fortress, as Taavetti still is.

Taavetti also has the Taavetti railway station on the Kouvola-Lappeenranta railway section, but passenger traffic at Taavetti station ended on 2 September 2006 due to low traffic.
