= Luumäki =

- Municipality
- Luumäen kunta Luumäki kommun
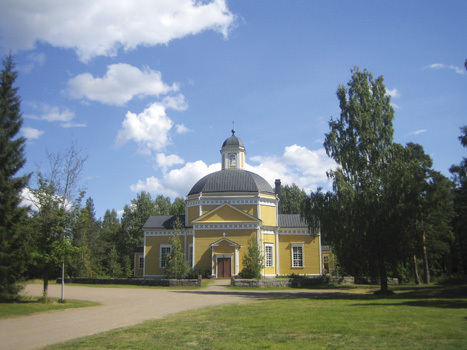
- Luumäki Lutheran Church

- Coat of arms

- Location of Luumäki in Finland
- Interactive map of Luumäki
- Coordinates: 60°55′N 027°34′E
- Country: Finland
- Region: South Karelia
- Sub-region: Lappeenranta sub-region
- Charter: 1642
- Seat: Taavetti

Government
  - Municipal manager: Anne Ukkonen

Area (2018-01-01)
  - Total: 859.83 km^{2} (331.98 sq mi)
  - Land: 750.16 km^{2} (289.64 sq mi)
  - Water: 109.77 km^{2} (42.38 sq mi)
  - Rank: 112th largest in Finland

Population (2025-12-31)
  - Total: 4,304
  - Rank: 183rd largest in Finland
  - Density: 5.74/km^{2} (14.9/sq mi)

Population by native language
  - Finnish: 93.5% (official)
  - Swedish: 0.4%
  - Others: 6.1%

Population by age
  - 0 to 14: 12%
  - 15 to 64: 53.3%
  - 65 or older: 34.7%
- Time zone: UTC+02:00 (EET)
  - Summer (DST): UTC+03:00 (EEST)
- Climate: Dfc
- Website: www.luumaki.fi

Luumäki (Finnish pronunciation: [ˈluːˌmæki]) is a municipality of Finland. Its seat is in the Taavetti village. It is located in the province of Southern Finland and is part of the South Karelia region. The municipality has a population of 4,304 (31 December 2025) and covers an area of 859.83 square kilometres (331.98 sq mi) of which 109.77 km^{2} (42.38 sq mi) is water. The population density is 5.74 inhabitants per square kilometre (14.9/sq mi). The municipality is unilingually Finnish.

Neighbour municipalities are Hamina, Kouvola, Lappeenranta, Lemi, Miehikkälä and Savitaipale. Lappeenranta is located 38 kilometres (24 mi) from Luumäki.

The president of Finland P. E. Svinhufvud died in Luumäki on February 29, 1944.

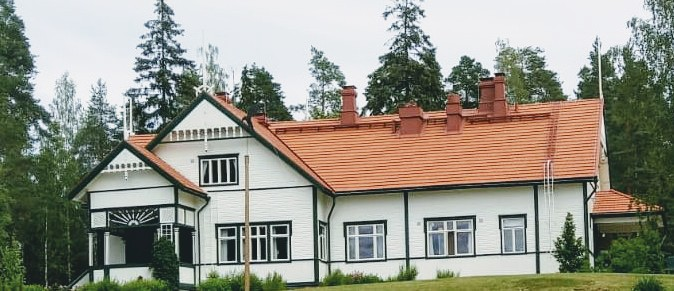
Kotkaniemi, a former home of President P. E. Svinhufvud and current museum, in Luumäki

The name Luumäki means literally "Bone Hill".

== History ==
Luumäki was separated from Lappee as its own parish in 1642. The first church in the Luumäki parish was probably built as soon as the parish became independent. It was destroyed during the Great Wrath (Isoviha). The second church, completed in 1731, was damaged during the Lesser Wrath (Pikkuviha) and had become small and in poor condition by the turn of the 19th century. The church and the belfry built from 1781 burned down in 1839. The parish had acquired the drawings of the new church even before the fire of the second church, but its construction did not begin until after the fire of the second church due to a dispute over the location. The new church was consecrated in 1845.

== Villages ==
Anjala, Antikkala, Askola, Ellola (Ellonen), Haimila, Heikkilä, Heimala, Hietamies, Himottula (Taina), Hirvikallio, Huomola, Huopainen, Husula, Huuhonkylä, Hyyrylä, Iihola, Inkilä, Junttola, Jurvala, Juurikkala (Juurikas), Kannuskoski, Keskinen, Kiurula, Kiviniemi, Kokkola, Kolppola, Kontula, Koskela, Kähölä, Lakkala (Lakka), Laukkala (Laukas), Lensula, Luotola, Marttila (Taavetti), Mentula, Metsola, Multiala, Munne (Munteenkylä), Niemi, Nokkala, Nuppola, Nurmiainen, Okkola, Orkola, Parola, Pitkäpää, Pukkila (Pukki), Pätärilä, Rantala, Saareks, Saarits, Saksala, Salmi, Sarkalahti, Sarvilahti, Siiropää, Sirkjärvi, Suoanttila, Suonpohja, Sydänmaanlakka, Taina, Tapavainola, Taukaniemi, Toikkala, Vainonen, Venäläinen, Viuhkola

== Culture ==
The Luumäki Live Music Association (Luumäen elävän musiikin yhdistys or Luumu ry), founded in 1986, organizes light music concerts and rehearsal opportunities for musicians. The annual jazz music event Vallijamit is held in Luumäki in July. The first Vallijamit was held in 2002. The former State Agency Building was renovated into a new library during 2013. In the summer of 2018, the Luumäki municipal library joined the Heili Libraries.

== Notable people ==
- Pehr Evind Svinhufvud
- Ilkka Remes
- Arvi Tynys
- Jarmo Mäkinen
- Esa Kirkkopelto
- Hannu Purho
- Sulo Saarits
- Jarno Kultanen
- Harald Haarmann
- Noora Kaisa Keränen
