= Finnish national road 2 =

Road from Helsinki to Pori, Finland

National Road 2
- Valtatie 2 (Finnish); Riksväg 2 (Swedish)
- Kakkostie
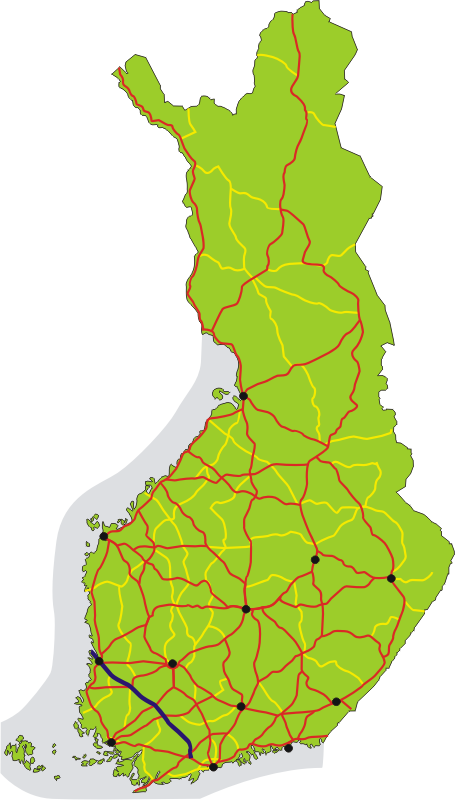

Route information
- Maintained by the Finnish Road Administration
- Length: 227 km (141 mi)
- Existed: 1938–present

Major junctions
- North end: Mäntyluoto, Pori
- South end: Vt 1 in Palojärvi, Vihti

Location
- Country: Finland
- Major cities: Karkkila, Forssa, Humppila, Huittinen, Kokemäki, Harjavalta, Ulvila

Highway system
- Highways in Finland
← Vt 1	→ Vt 3

The Finnish national road 2 (Finnish: Valtatie 2, Swedish: Riksväg 2) is a main route between Vihti and Pori. The road runs from Palojärvi, Vihti to Mäntyluoto, Pori. The road is mainly a typical Finnish road with two driving lanes. National road 2 has a short part of motorway on its starting place and it is only 1 kilometer long and that means it is the shortest motorway in Finland and National road 2 has another bypass in Pori which is about 7 kilometers long.

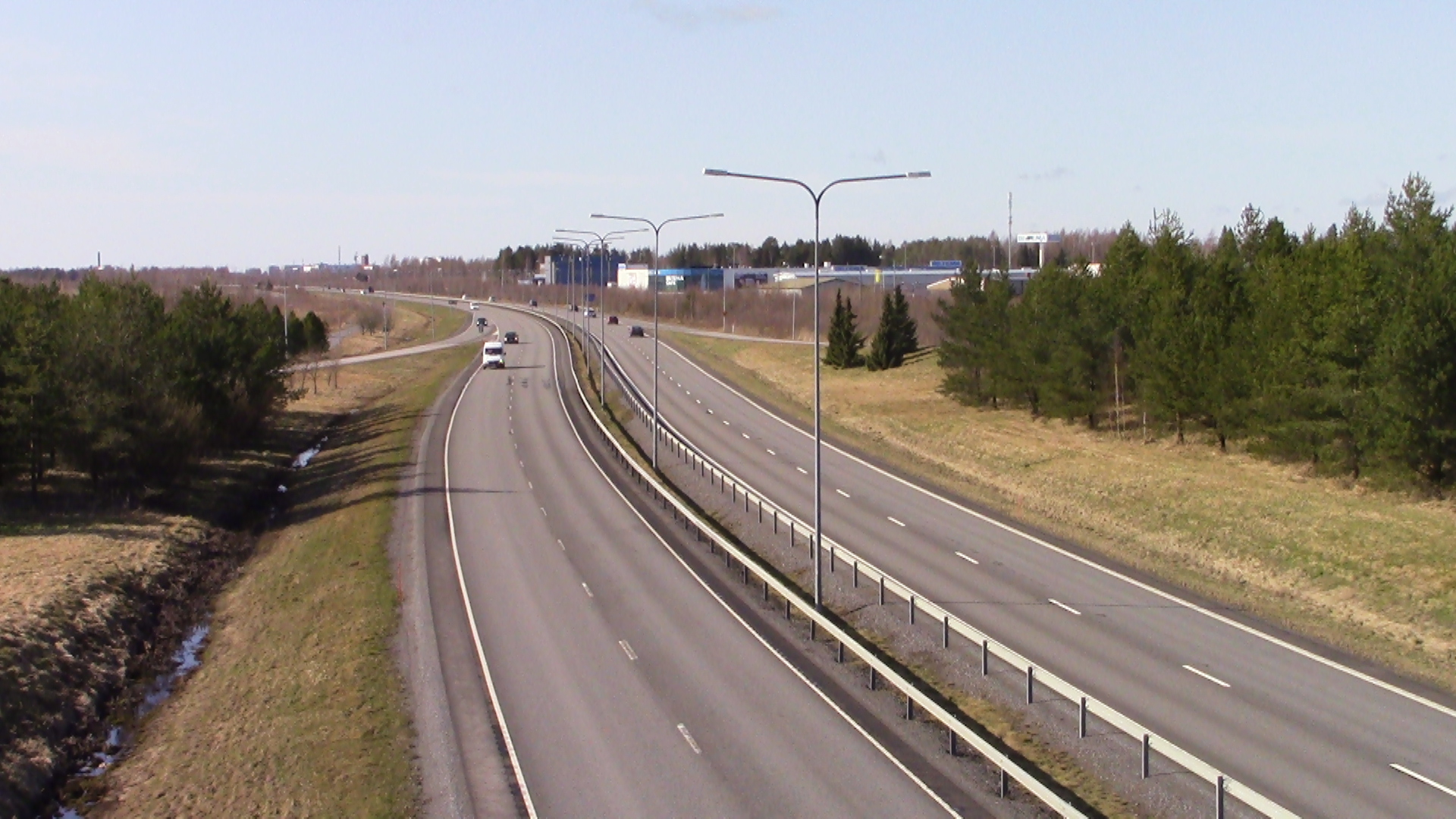
The bypass at Honkaluoto interchange in Pori.

== History ==
=== Old route ===
In the 1938 numbering system, the route from Helsinki to Pori was numbered as national road 2. At that time, the route ran concurrent with national road 1 (now regional road 110) to Saukkola, from where it continued via current roads 1253, 125 and 280 to Somero. From there road 2 continued along current roads 52 and 213 to Loimaa and the former routes of roads 213, 2101 and 41 to Huittinen. From Lautakyla in Huittinen, the road continued partially along its current alignment to Ronkankulma, and from there via Ronkantie to Riste in Kokemäki. The old section of road 2 between Kokemäki and Pori initially ran along current roads 2470, 2463 and 2453 to Nakkila, from where it continued via Haistila and Friitala to Pori.

Before the road was rebuilt, connections from Forssa to Helsinki ran along main road 54 (Loppi–Forssa–Jokioinen).

=== Current route ===
The initial section of the new highway from Helsinki to Karkkila was built between 1942 and 1957, and the section from Karkkila to Pori was completed in the late 1950s and early 1960s. The section between Helsinki and Karkkila was built on uneven terrain, resulting in a great deal of rock cutting. The leading politician of the Social Democrats, Väinö Tanner, owned a farm in the northern part of Espoo and was said to have influenced the alignment of the road, so this section of the road was once commonly known as "Tannerin tie", or Tanner's Road.

The road was constructed to a width of 8 m (26 ft) according to the standards of the time, making it narrower than newer highways. When it was completed, the section between Ring III and Olkkala was dangerous due to its winding and hilly nature. Therefore, in the mid 1970s, a new, slightly longer but smoother route was built from road 1 via Palojärvi to Olkkala. The initial section of the old road, called Vihdintie, was numbered to regional road 120. Later the only dangerous part between Olkkala and Karkkila was completed as a bypass road in 1997. The seven-kilometer section between Pori and Friitala was also widened to a four-lane road in the late 1990s.

The section from Pori to Mäntyluoto did not get a highway number until 1996. The road was previously regional road 265. This section is very straight but narrow and the road's speed limit in that section is 80 km/h.

== See also ==
- Highways in Finland
- Vihdintie
- Åland Islands Highway 2
