= Finnish national road 7 =

Road in Finland

National Road 7
- Valtatie 7 (Finnish); Riksväg 7 (Swedish)
- Porvoonväylä
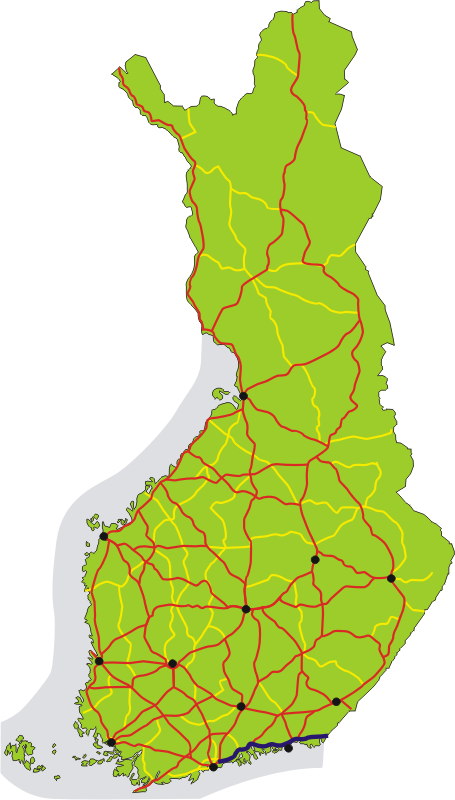

Route information
- Part of E18
- Maintained by the Finnish Road Administration
- Length: 189 km (117 mi)
- Existed: 1938–present

Major junctions
- West end: Helsinki
- East end: Russian border in Virolahti

Location
- Country: Finland
- Major cities: Porvoo, Kotka, Hamina

Highway system
- Highways in Finland
← Vt 6	→ Vt 8

Finnish national road 7 (Finnish: Valtatie 7; Swedish: Riksväg 7) is a highway in Finland. It runs from Erottaja in Helsinki to the Russian frontier at the Vaalimaa border crossing point in Virolahti. The road is 189 kilometres (117 mi) long. The road is also European route E18 and it is a part of TERN.

== Route ==
The route of the road is Helsinki – Vantaa – Porvoo – Loviisa – Kotka – Hamina – Vaalimaa (Russian border). With the section of motorway between Loviisa and Kotka opened to traffic in September 2014, the route from Helsinki to Hamina is now a continuous motorway. After completion of the motorway section bypassing the town of Hamina, due in late 2014, 155 km (96 mi) of the highway's total length of 193 km (120 mi) will be motorway. There is a plan to extend the motorway from its current endpoint in Lelu, Hamina to Vaalimaa by 2018, finalizing the motorway link between Helsinki and the Russian border; construction is due to begin in late 2015.

== Images ==
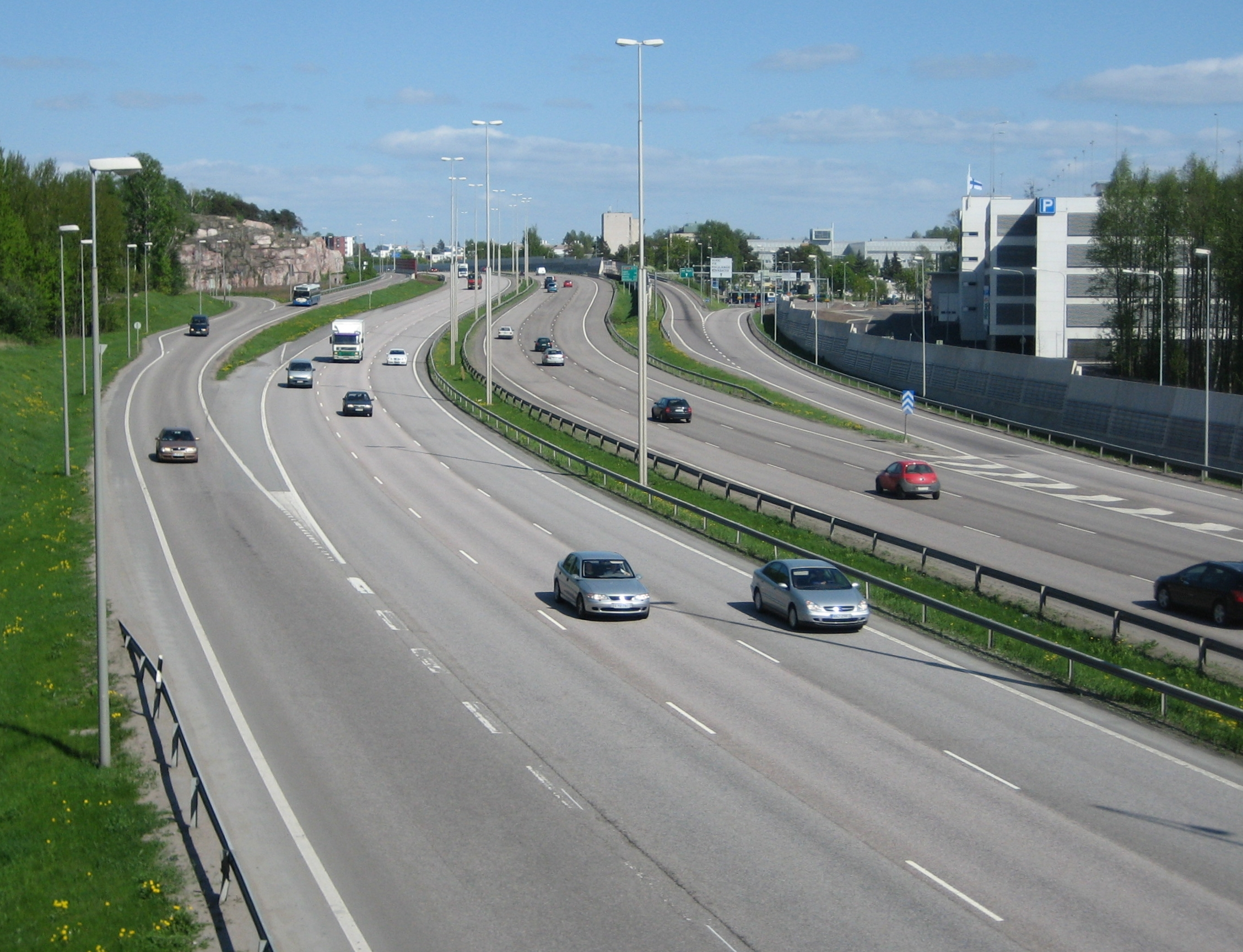
National road 7 in Viikki, Helsinki

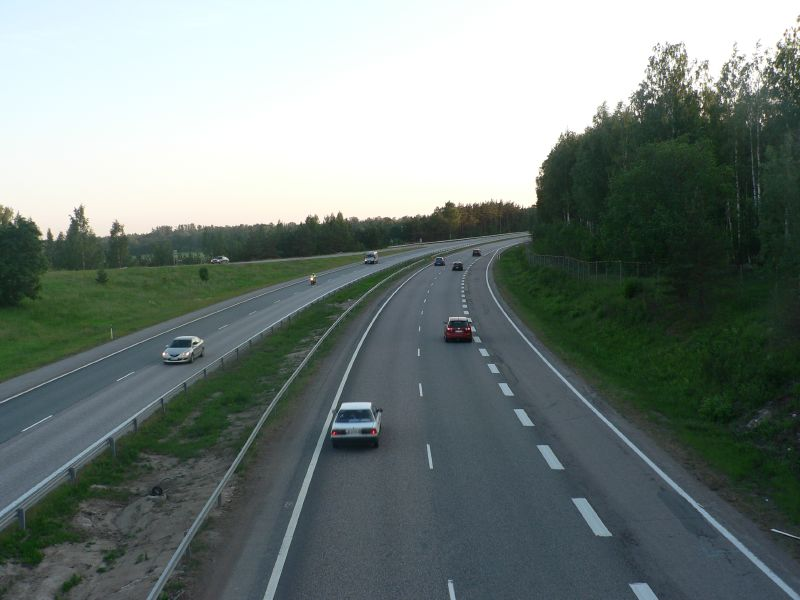
National road 7 in Sipoo

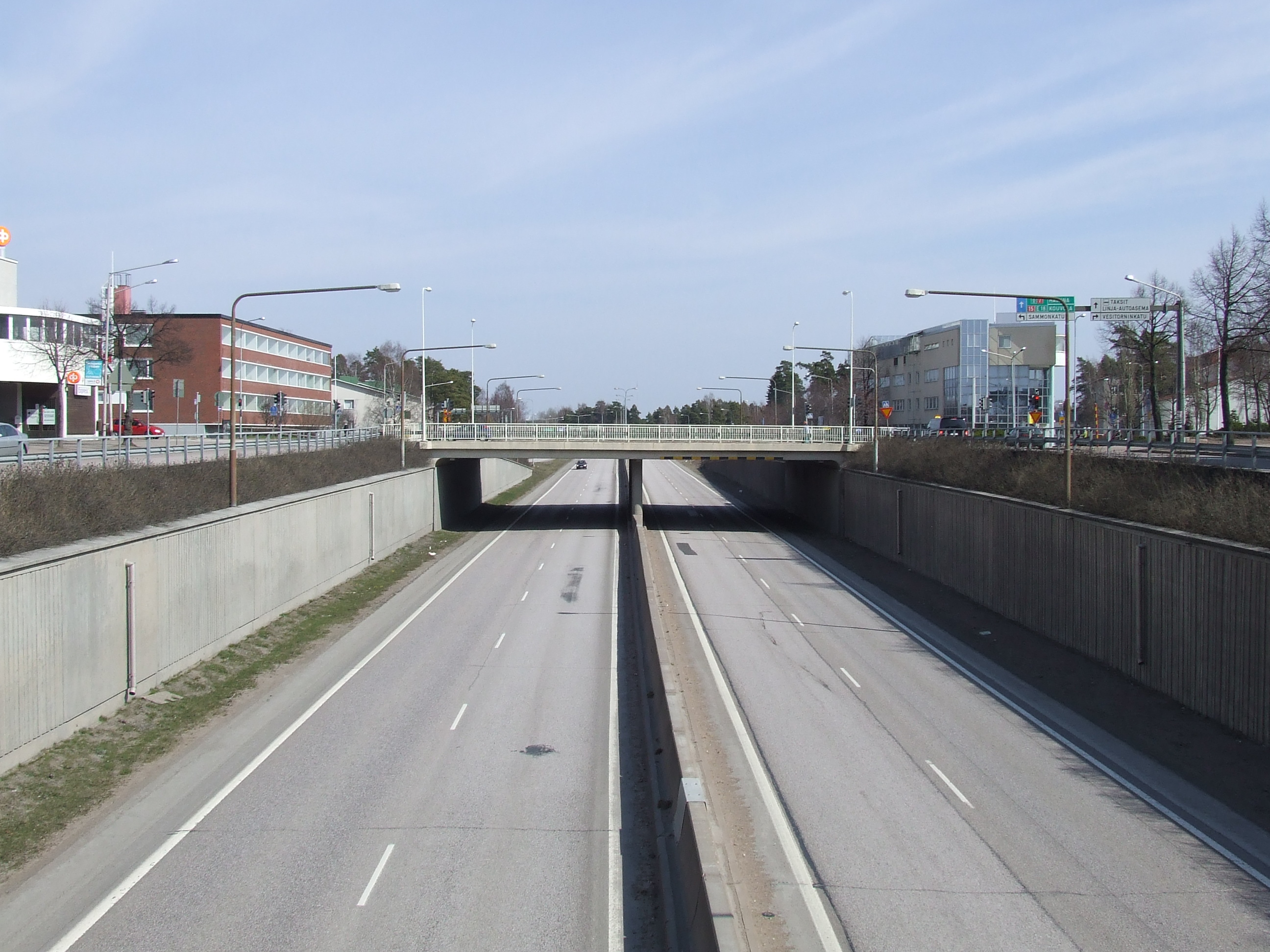
Motorway in Karhula

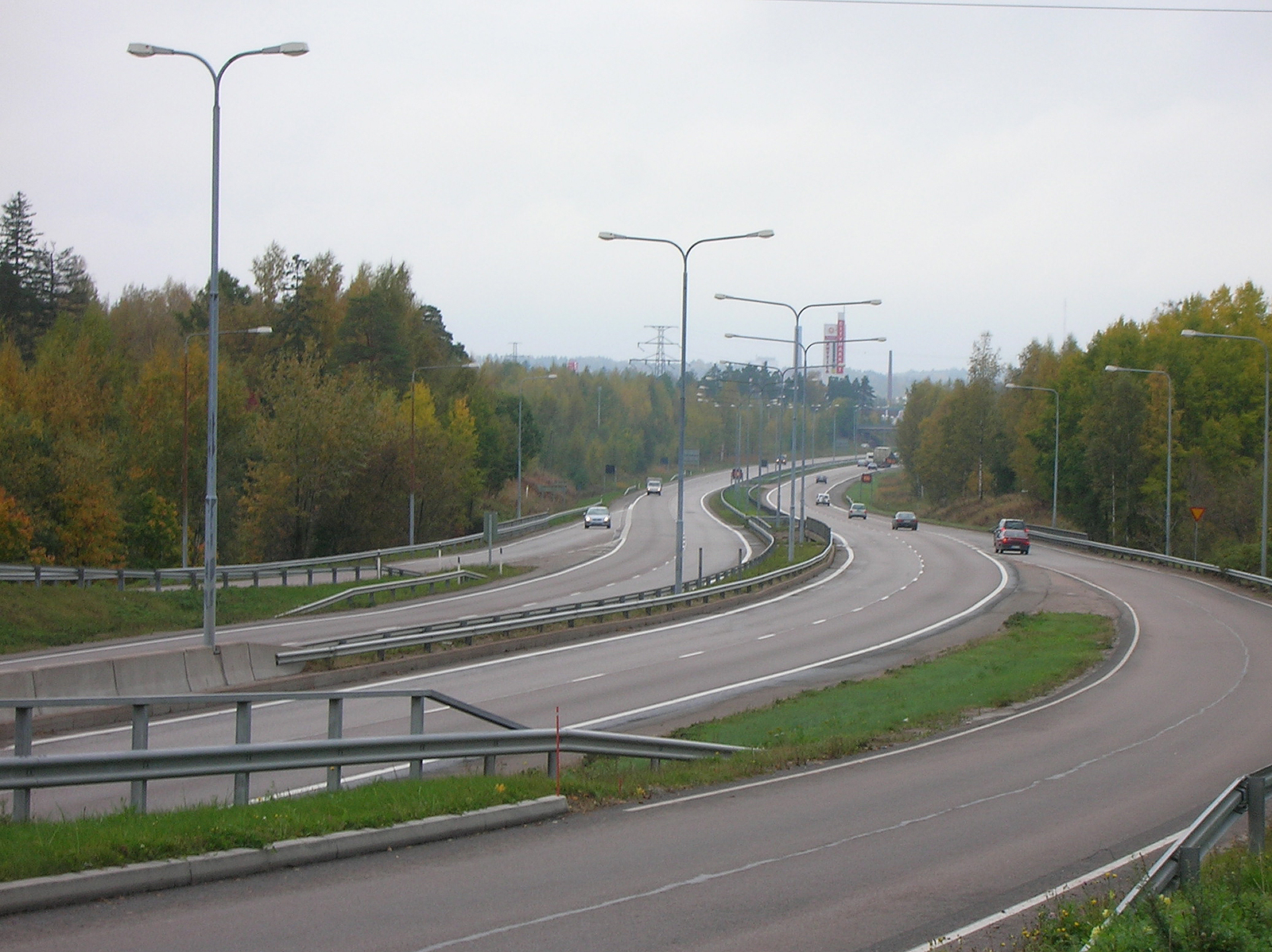
Motorway in Kotka

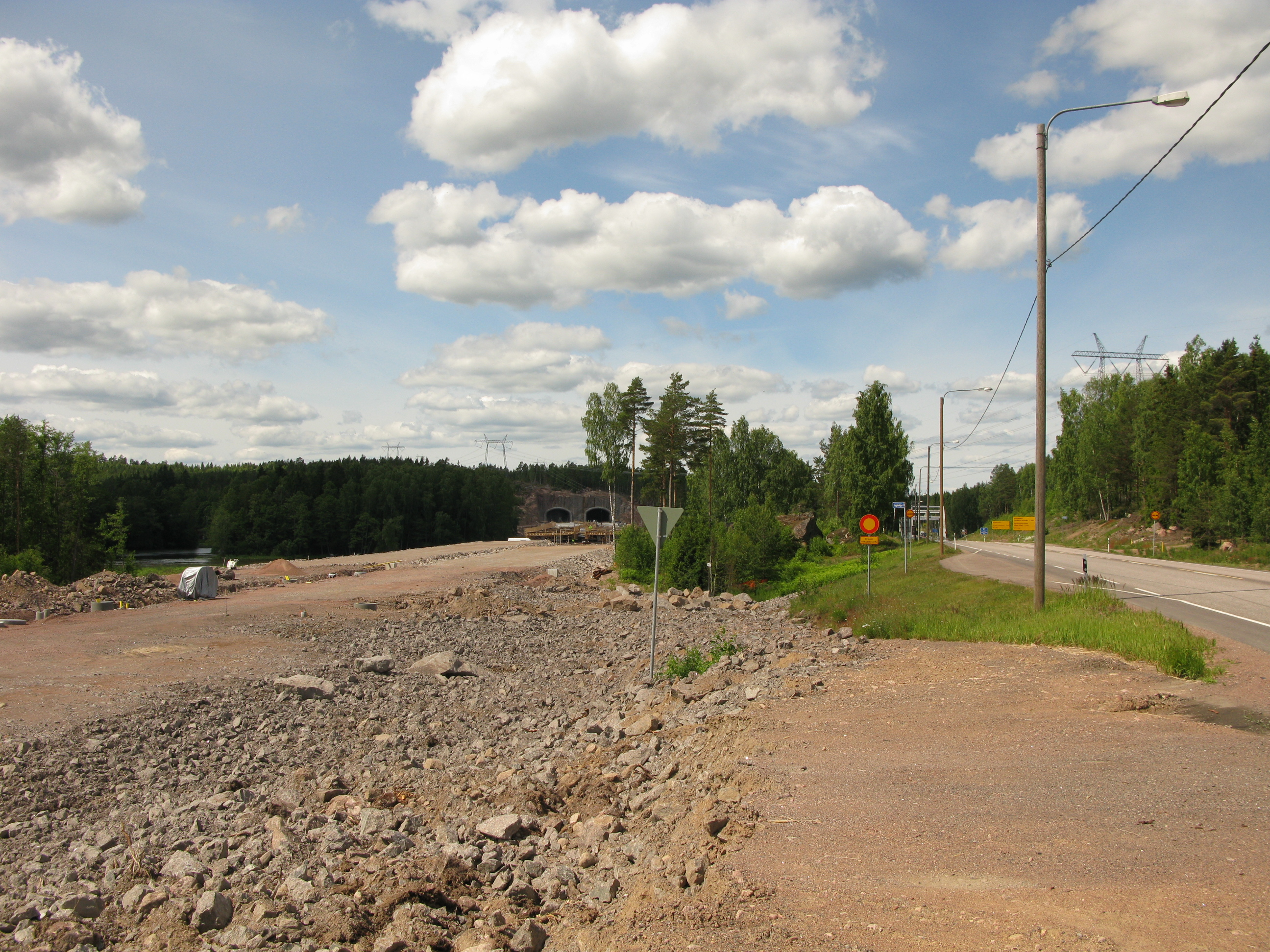
New and old National road 7 in Pyhtää

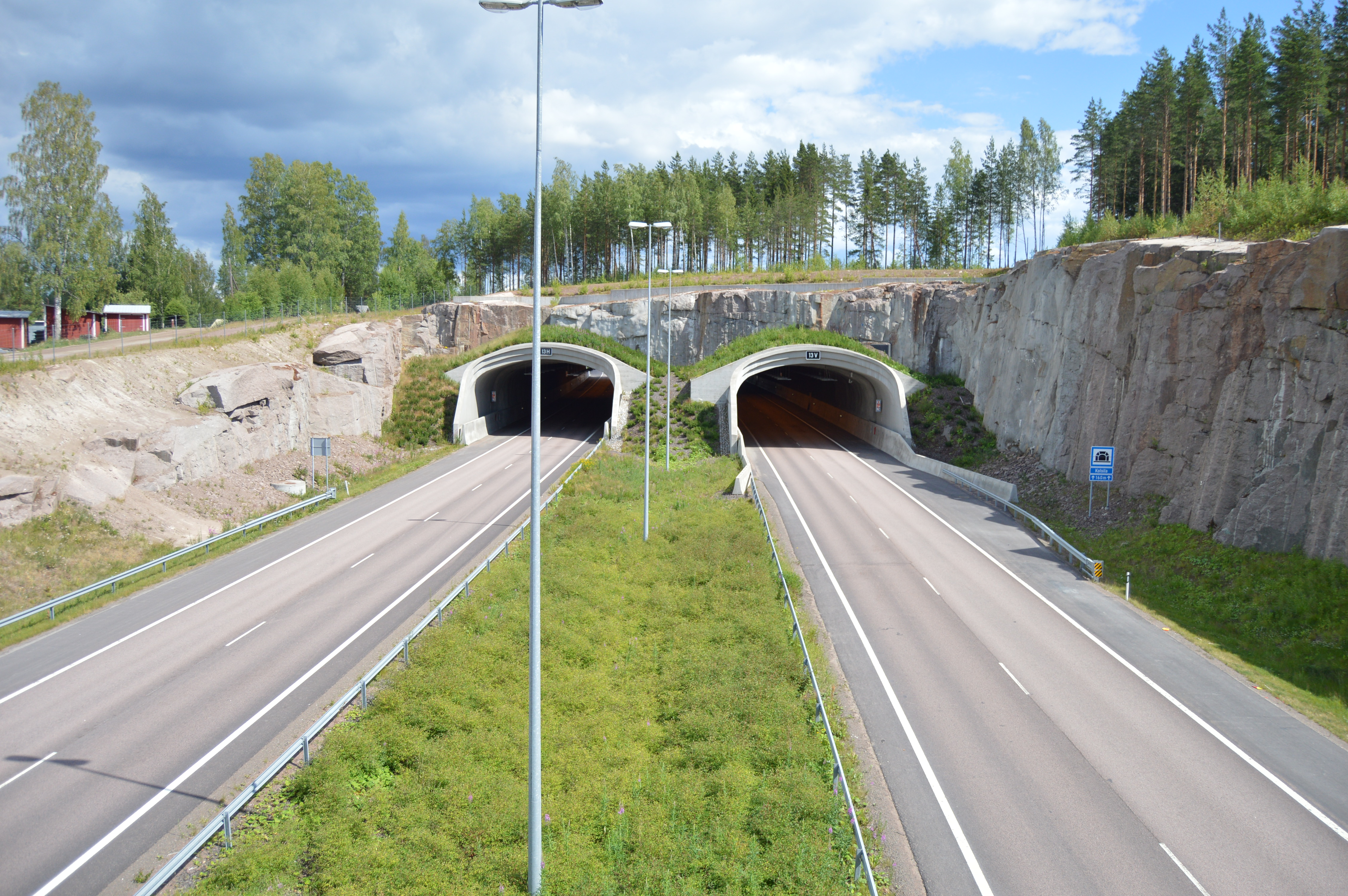
Highway 7, Kolsila tunnel in Hamina

== See also ==
- Itäväylä
