= Ylistaro =

Former municipality in South Ostrobothnia, Finland

- Former municipality
- Ylistaron kunta Ylistaro kommun
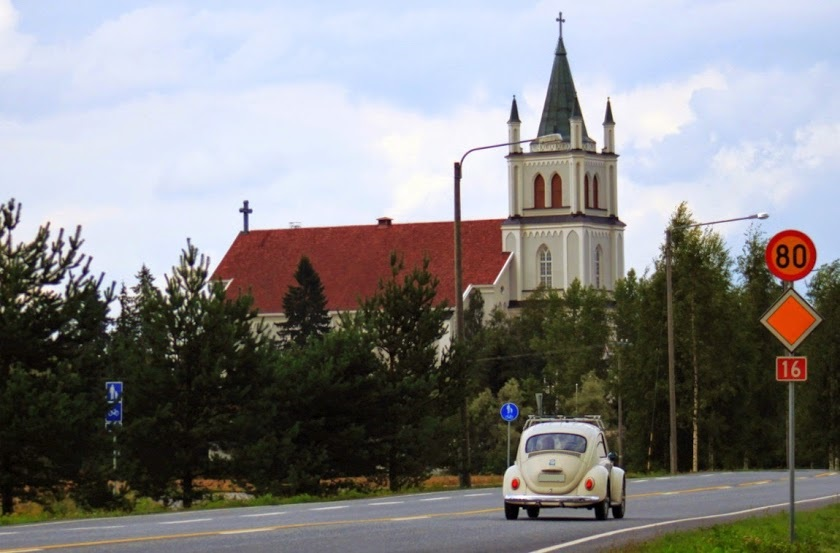
- Ylistaro Church

- Coat of arms

- Interactive map of Ylistaro
- Country: Finland
- Province: Western Finland
- Region: South Ostrobothnia
- Sub-region: Seinäjoki
- Merged with Seinäjoki: January 1, 2009
- Time zone: UTC+2 (EET)
  - Summer (DST): UTC+3 (EEST)
- Official languages: Finnish

Ylistaro is a former municipality of Finland. It was consolidated, together with Nurmo to Seinäjoki on 1 January 2009.
