= Finnish national road 8 =

Road in Finland

National Road 8
- Valtatie 8 (Finnish); Riksväg 8 (Swedish)
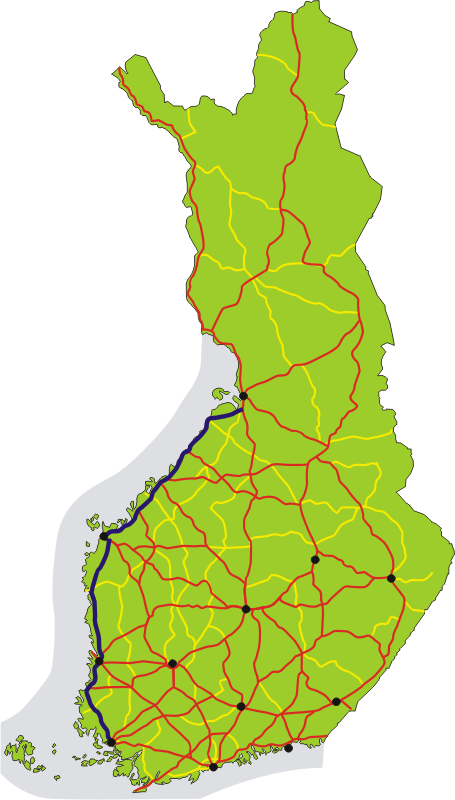

Route information
- Part of E8
- Maintained by the Finnish Transport Agency
- Length: 626 km (389 mi)
- Existed: 1938–present

Major junctions
- From: Turku
- Vaasa
- To: Liminka

Location
- Country: Finland
- Major cities: Rauma, Pori, Vaasa, Kokkola

Highway system
- Highways in Finland
← Vt 7	→ Vt 9

Finnish national road 8 (Finnish: valtatie 8, Swedish: riksväg 8) runs along the western coast of Finland. The road starts at Turku, continues to Vaasa and ends in the intersection with Finnish national road 4 in Liminka, 25 km south of Oulu. It constitutes much of the length of European route E8. Cities along the road are Rauma, Pori, Kristinestad, Närpes, Vaasa, Nykarleby, Kokkola and Raahe. From Liminka, the road continues to the same direction to Oulu as road 4; road 4 to Liminka intersects it from the left.

== Overview ==
Although running along the coast of the Gulf of Bothnia, it is not a scenic coastal road: the only views of the sea are when the road crosses the mouth of Kyrönjoki river in Vassor, Korsholm and Oravaisfjärden, Oravais (Finnish: Oravaistenlahti, Oravainen). Most of the road is regular road with one lane in each direction. There are short sections of motorway in the stretches Turku–Nousiainen and Vaasa–Helsingby (motorway exiting Vaasa, shared with Finnish national road 3).

== Route ==
The road goes through the following municipalities: Turku – Raisio – Masku – Nousiainen – Mynämäki – Laitila – Pyhäranta – Rauma – Eurajoki – Luvia – Pori – Merikarvia – Kristinestad – Närpes – Malax – Korsholm (south) – Vaasa – Korsholm (north) – Vörå – Nykarleby – Pedersöre – Kronoby – Kokkola – Kalajoki – Pyhäjoki – Raahe – Siikajoki – Lumijoki – Liminka.

In Vaasa and Korsholm, the road (as Porintie) merges with the Vaasa-Helsingby motorway in Vikby, continues along this road to a motorway exit into Yhdystie, which bypasses Vaasa city center from east, and again through an exit to the right (east) as Kokkolantie into Kokkola and beyond.

A notable bypass is that of Nykarleby and Jakobstad, which lie some 9–10 km north of the road.

== History ==
The route has been almost the same since the establishment of the numbering system in 1938, although the road has been rebuilt along its whole length at least once. Two major changes have been made: the bypass of Nykarleby and replacement of the Siikajoki–Lumijoki route with a route through Revonlahti, where the road now goes straight from Raahe to Liminka without circling along the coast. Furthermore, bypasses have been built around cities. A new bypass of Sepänkylä for approaching Vaasa from the north was recently completed.
