= Jarl Brommels =

- Born: January 20, 1921; Bergö, Finland
- Died: December 21, 2007 (aged 86); Helsinki, Finland
- Occupations: Executive director, organisational leader
- Known for: Leading Folkhälsan 1950–1981

Jarl Brommels (20 January 1921 – 21 December 2007) was a Finnish organisational leader and honorary counsellor who served as executive director of Samfundet Folkhälsan — the main public health organisation serving the Swedish-speaking population of Finland — from 1950 to 1981. Under his leadership, Folkhälsan grew from a loosely connected network of local associations into a central actor in Finnish public health work, combining extensive preventive outreach with a broad range of services.

== Biography ==
Brommels was born on 20 January 1921 on Bergö, an island in the Gulf of Bothnia, and grew up in Närpes in western Finland. His father, Albert Brommels, was a primary school teacher, journalist and member of parliament for the Swedish People's Party; under the pen name Post-Janne he published humorous columns in the press. His mother was Anna Stenfors. Brommels developed an early interest in civic affairs and was active in student organisations, serving as treasurer of the student union at Åbo Akademi University. In 1946 he married Hedvig Marianne Klingstedt, an editor and master of arts. After graduating with a degree in political science in 1947, he worked as secretary to the Svenska Finlands folktingsfullmäktige, the representative assembly of Finland's Swedish-speaking minority, before moving in 1950 to Samfundet Folkhälsan.

== Folkhälsan ==
When Brommels took up his post, Folkhälsan consisted of a number of largely independent local associations with a total of 47 employees. Under his leadership the organisation underwent extensive restructuring. A regional district organisation was established to support the work of the 81 local associations. As the organisation expanded rapidly, Brommels's title was upgraded in 1968 from director of operations to executive director. By the time he retired in 1981, Folkhälsan had around 280 employees, approximately 170 of them at the central organisation in Helsinki. His leadership style was characterised by a combination of calm, warmhearted humour and meticulous administration.

=== The Finland–Sweden twinning programme ===
From 1956 to 1973 Brommels served on the board of the Central Association for the Finland–Sweden Twinning Programme (Centralförbundet för fadderortsverksamheten Finland-Sverige), which supported public health work, day care, educational activities, swimming schools and similar initiatives. Through this collaboration Folkhälsan received financial support from Sweden, including grants for the acquisition of the archipelago vessels Lyckoslanten (1948) and Gullkronan (1951). These so-called health boats served as mobile health centres equipped with advisory services, dental care and miniature X-ray equipment, reaching communities in the Finnish archipelago. During the 1950s the twinning programme gradually evolved into a broader programme of cultural cooperation between Finland and Sweden.

=== Preventive public health work ===
During the 1970s preventive public health work became an increasingly central focus — an orientation already visible in 1969, when a campaign for a healthy living environment was launched. Folkhälsan established the company Folkhälsan-Kansanterveys Ab to produce health education material for use by municipalities. Under Brommels's leadership, campaigns were conducted on road safety, tobacco awareness, environmental issues and cooperation between home and school.

=== The habilitation unit ===
Brommels considered the founding of the habilitation unit at Folkhälsan's Child Care Institute in 1974 to be his most important achievement. The institute had trained Swedish-speaking child care nurses since 1933, and since the late 1950s had maintained an outpatient clinic for children with intellectual disabilities, funded by the annual Lucia charity collections — a Scandinavian tradition in which funds are raised around 13 December each year. In 1963 the institute opened its first inpatient ward for children with cerebral palsy, where the children also received schooling. The unit was gradually expanded and by the early 1980s it met the needs of the entire Swedish-speaking population of Finland.

== Other roles and later life ==
Alongside his work at Folkhälsan, Brommels held positions of trust in the twinning movement, the Slot Machine Association (Penningautomatföreningen), and the consumer cooperative Elanto. In retirement he published four books on the history of Folkhälsan as well as a genealogical study of his family. He was fond of spending his leisure time in the archipelago, and died on 21 December 2007 in Helsinki. The family's commitment to Folkhälsan has continued: his nephew, Professor Mats Brommels, later served as chair of the organisation.
