= Finnish national road 67 =

Road in Finland

Highway 67
- Kantatie 67 (Finnish); Stamväg 67 (Swedish)
- Pohjan valtatie
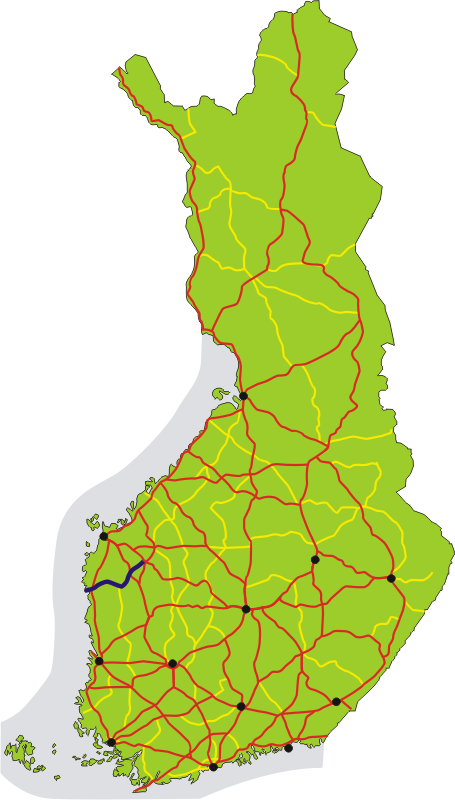

Route information
- Maintained by the Finnish Transport Agency
- Length: 115 km (71 mi)
- Existed: 1938–present

Major junctions
- From: Kaskinen
- To: Seinäjoki

Location
- Country: Finland

Highway system
- Highways in Finland
← Kt 66	→ Kt 68

The Finnish national road 67 (Finnish: kantatie 67; Swedish: stamväg 67) is the 2nd class main route from Kaskinen to Nurmo, which belongs to Seinäjoki. The road is 115 kilometers long and is mainly two-lane, except for the center of Seinäjoki, where the road is four-lane. The road is for the most part of good quality, in some places even highway, and its traffic volumes are quite variable.

== History ==
In the 1938 numbering system, main road 67 ran between Kristianstad and Nykarleby. The route was improved and straightened between the 1960s and 1980s. The northern end was shortened to Ytterjeppo in the late 1960s (the old route became road 7246 and is now regional road 749). In 1971, the southern end was realigned to Närpiö. In the 1996 road number reform, the main road section between Seinäjoki and Ytterjeppo was changed to Highway 19 and main road 67 was shortened to end at Seinäjoki. At the same time, however, the road continued from its western end to continue to Kaskinen. In 2017, the section from Seinäjoki to Nurmo returned to main road 67 when Highway 19 was rerouted onto the Seinäjoki eastern bypass.

== Route ==
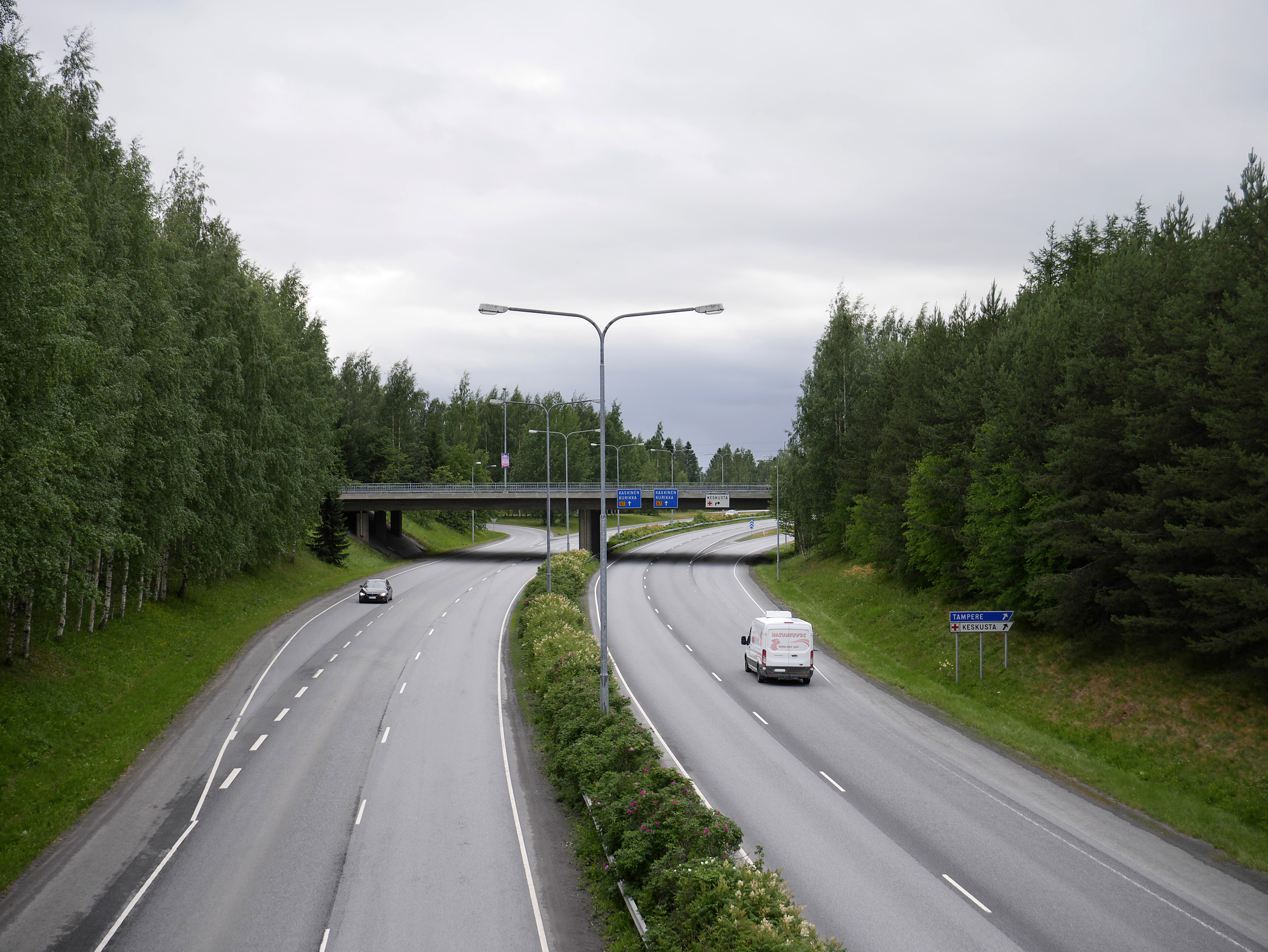
A four-laned part of highway in Seinäjoki

The road passes through the following localities:

- Kaskinen
- Närpes
- Teuva
- Kauhajoki
- Kurikka
- Ilmajoki
- Seinäjoki

== Sources ==
- "Autoilijan tiekartta 2007" (in Finnish). Helsinki: AffectoGenimap Finland Oy. 2006. Archived from the original on November 3, 2012.
- "020202 – Kartat" (in Finnish). Fonecta. 2007.
- "Eniro Kartat ja reitit" (in Finnish). Eniro.
- Grönroos, Matti. "Kantatie 67 Kaskinen–Seinäjoki, 109 km" (in Finnish).
- "Fonecta Kartat". fonecta.fi (in Finnish). Fonecta.
