= Bergö =

Former municipality of Finland

- Former municipality
- Bergö kommun Bergön kunta
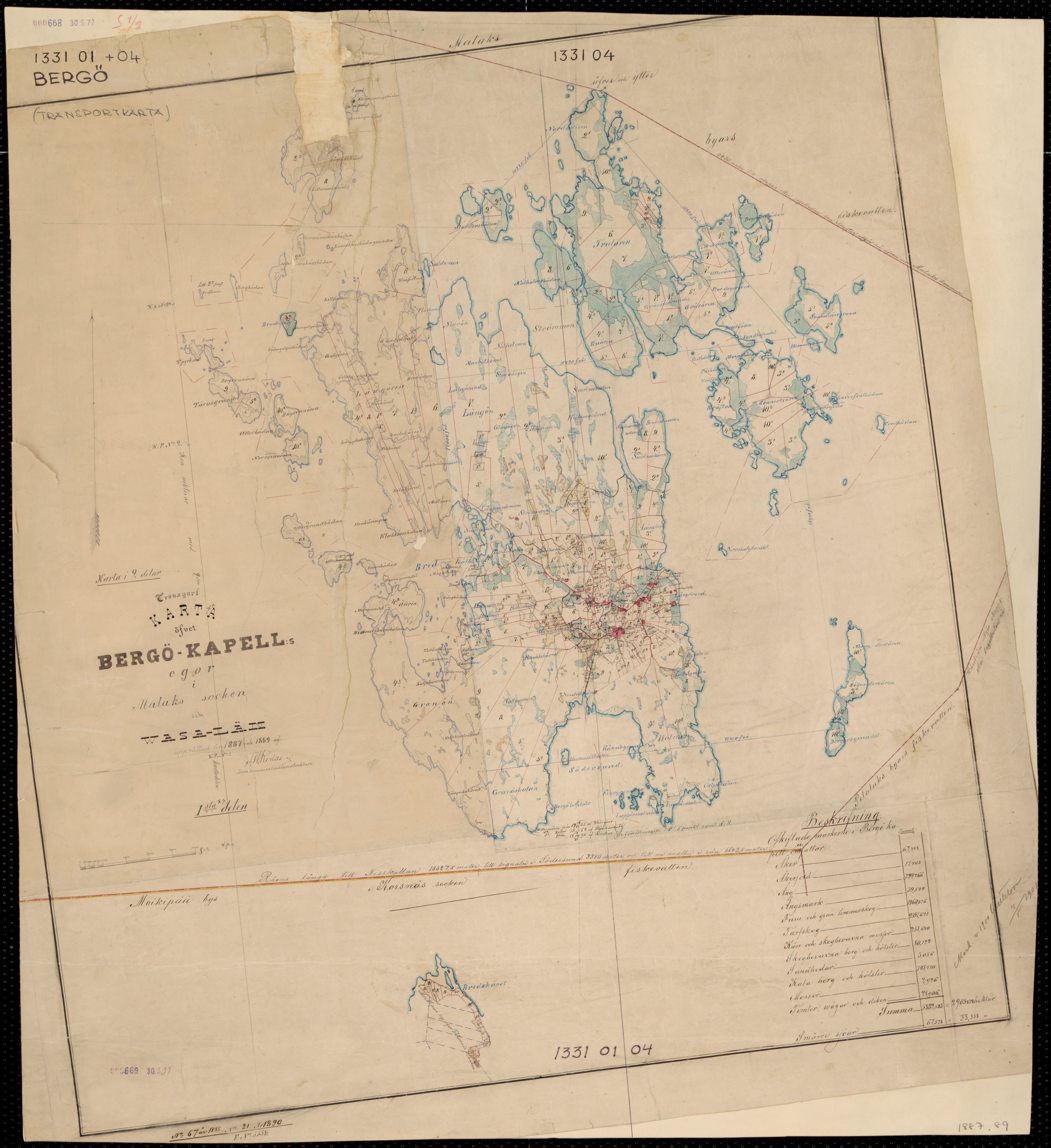
- Parish map of Bergö in Finland

- Coat of arms

- Location of Bergö in Finland
- Interactive map of Bergö
- Coordinates: 62°58′30″N 021°10′21″E
- Country: Finland
- Region: Ostrobothnia
- Merged into Malax: 1973
- Seat: Vaasa sub-region

Area
  - Land: 33.8 km^{2} (13.1 sq mi)

Population (31 December 1972)
  - Total: 640
  - Density: 19.1/km^{2} (49/sq mi)
- Administrative center: Bergö

Bergö is an island and former municipality of Finland in the Coastal Ostrobothnia region. The municipality of Bergö was incorporated with Malax in 1973. The island's only connection to the mainland is currently the year-round ferry.

In December 1970, Bergö had a total population of 647 people, and 98% of the inhabitants were Swedish-speaking. At its highest population level in 1938, 948 people lived in the municipality. Before it was abolished, Bergö's land area was 33.8 km^{2} and its neighbouring municipalities were Korsnäs, Malax and Petalax.

== Name ==
Bergö's name was originally Vargö [transl. 'wolf', 'thief'], but the name of the island and village was changed to Bergö in 1830, probably because the original name was considered demeaning. The name of the island was documented as Wargö (1546) and as Vargöö (1552), among others. The form Susiluoto ('Wolf Island') has also been used in Finnish.

== History ==
Originally, Bergö was four separate islands: Granön, Långön, Norrön and Holmen, which later merged due to post-glacial rebound. The history of Bergö Island goes all the way back to the late 1400s, when the first farmer was mentioned in 1495. In the 1500s, the island had nine houses, and about 40 inhabitants. Bergö, which was originally part of the parish of Korsholm, shared a prayer house with Malax in 1652 and a chapel parish in 1848. Bergö parish became independent in 1908 and received its own vicar for the first time in 1911. The parish is now part of the Malax parish union, and of the Porvoo Communion. Bergö island was granted a ferry connection in 1962, when the ferry sailed from Vaasa only during the daytime. In 1979, this was replaced by a cable ferry, which runs from 5:30am to 00:10am every day; outside these times, the ferry can be called with buttons on the beaches.

The municipality of Bergö was merged with Malax in 1973.

Bergö's attractions include its wooden church, which was built in 1800-1802 and extended to its current appearance in 1852–1853.

== Bergö village ==
Bergö's only village is also called Bergö, and is approximately 3.15 km2 in size, with roughly 480 inhabitants. Its neighbourhoods include Bredhällan, Holme, Granön, Långön, Perisgrund and Södersund.

The population has remained relatively stable over the past ten years. There are about 60 jobs in the village and the proportion of those working elsewhere is about 50 percent. Most jobs are found in the service sector and the proportion of primary production has clearly decreased. In 2003, there were about 40 full-time fishermen in the village. The jobs provided by the Coast Guard and pilotage have largely disappeared, but the Bergö ferry connection still employs six people.

== Infrastructure and services ==
There is a fishing port on Ytterbådan, as well as marinas at Bredhällan, Perisgrund and at Norrsundet. A guest jetty and service house are located near the ferry berth. Bergö Båtklubb rf takes care of the small boat fairways in the Bergö archipelago.

Bergö has a ferry connection that operates according to a timetable. The bus connection from Bergö to Vaasa currently runs only once a day on weekdays. Two-thirds of households have access to the municipal water supply and sewerage system. The cable TV network is extended to the majority of households and the option of fast fibre connectivity is also available. The Petalax-Bergö local television channel broadcasts two days a week.

Other services at Bergö include: a school for grades 1–6, day care, two grocery stores, bank, library, hairdressers, flower and gift stalls, café, medicine cabinet, post office, swimming beach, mini golf course, sauna, riding school. Bergö residents are very active in associations.

== Population ==
The following graph shows the population development of Bergö every ten years between 1880 and 1970.

Population development of Bergö 1880–1970
Year	Population
1880	637
1890	765
1900	765
1910	628
1920	664
1930	808
1940	824
1950	743
1960	686
1970	642

According to the urban boundaries of 1960 and 1970, there were no agglomerations in Bergö. Today, however, the village of Bergö is defined as an urban settlement.

== Gallery ==
Images of Bergö's wooden church
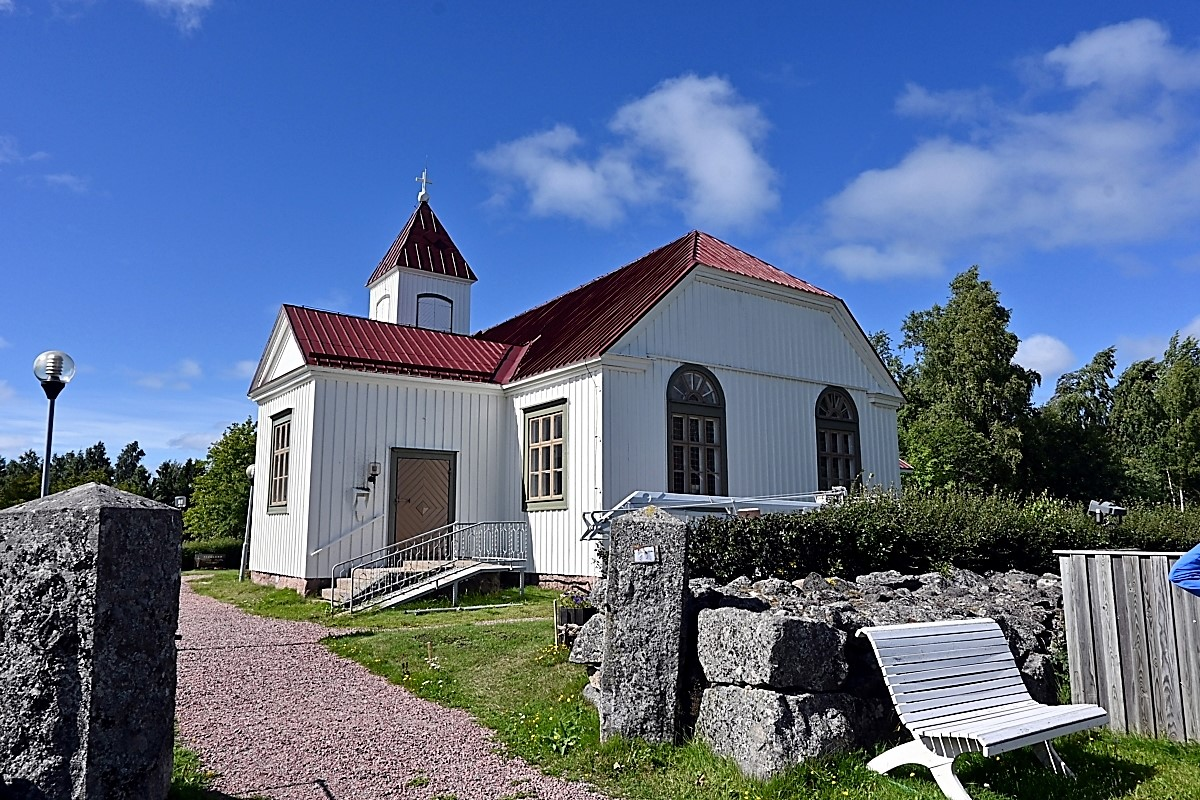
Path to Bergö wooden church

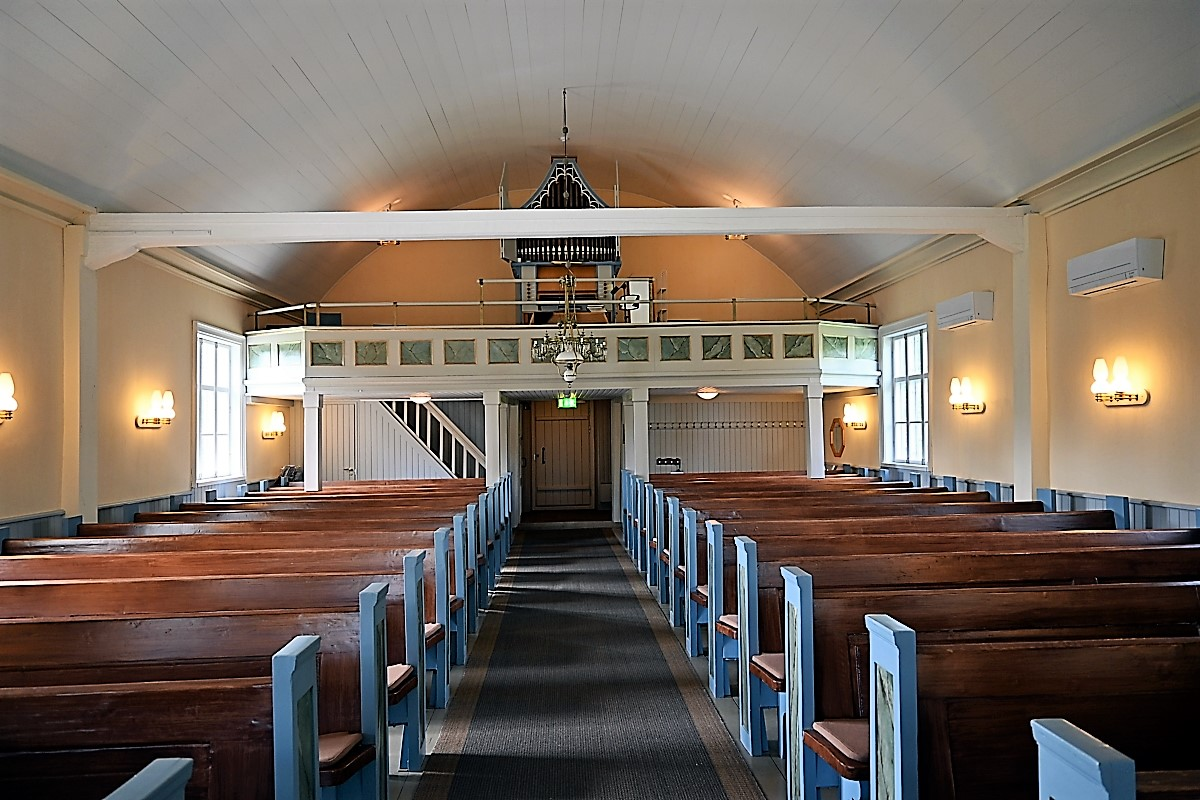
Nave and entrance door

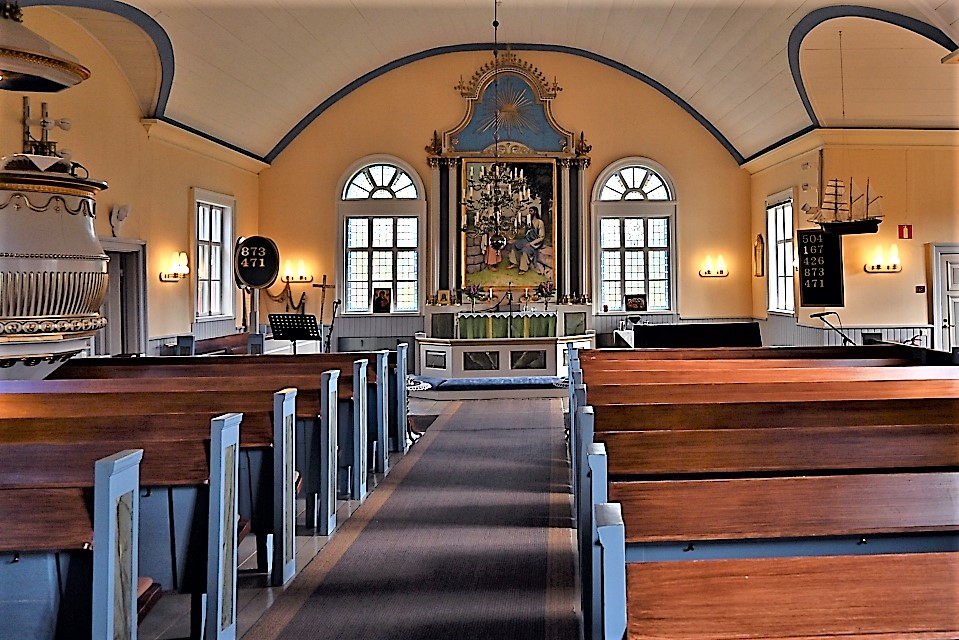
Nave and altar

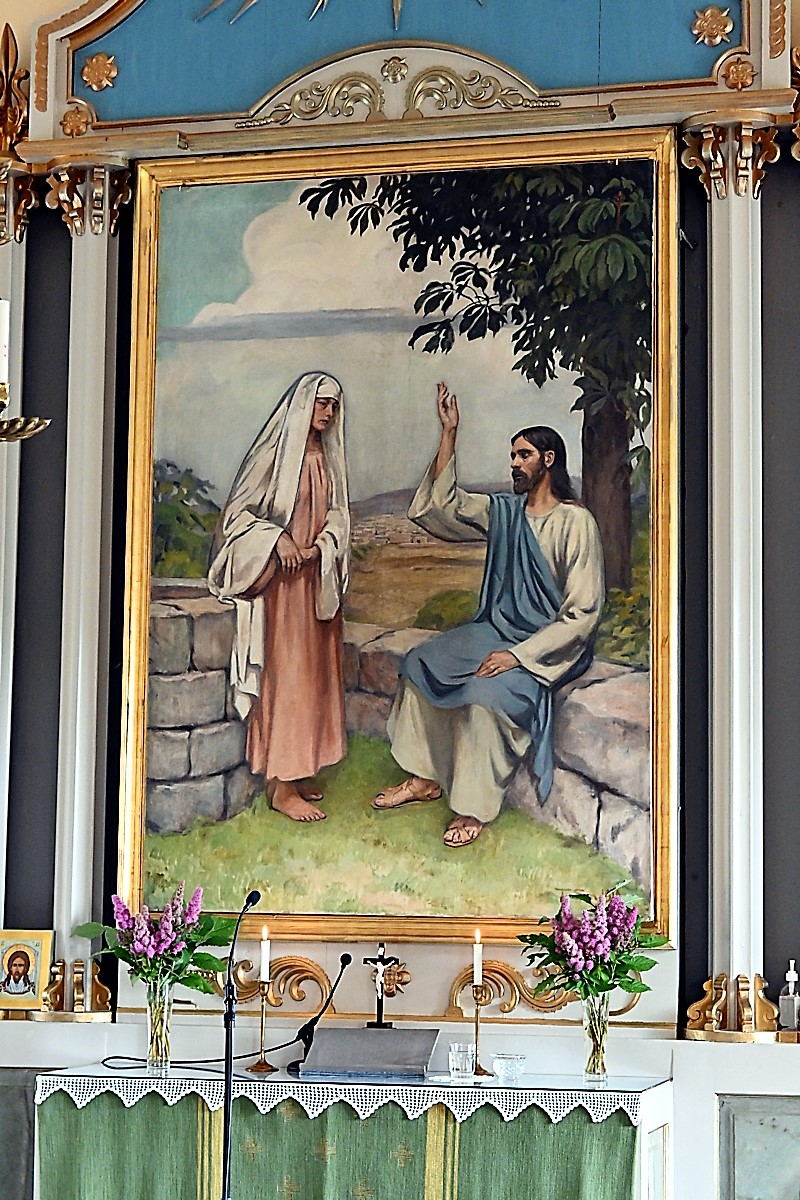
Altarpiece

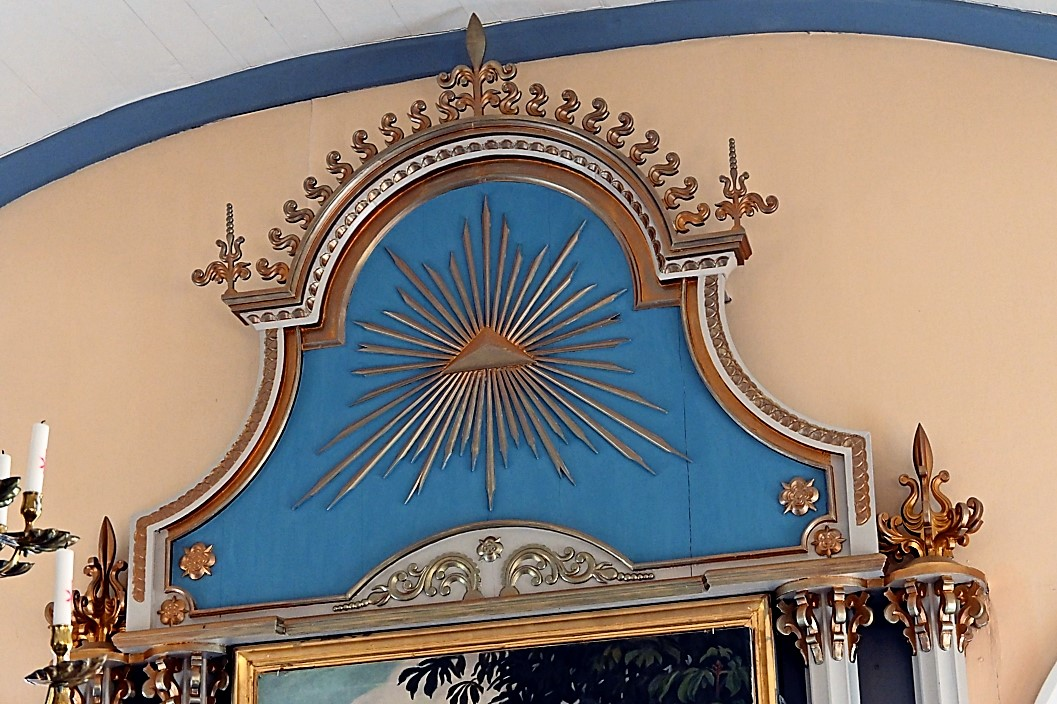
Top of altarpiece

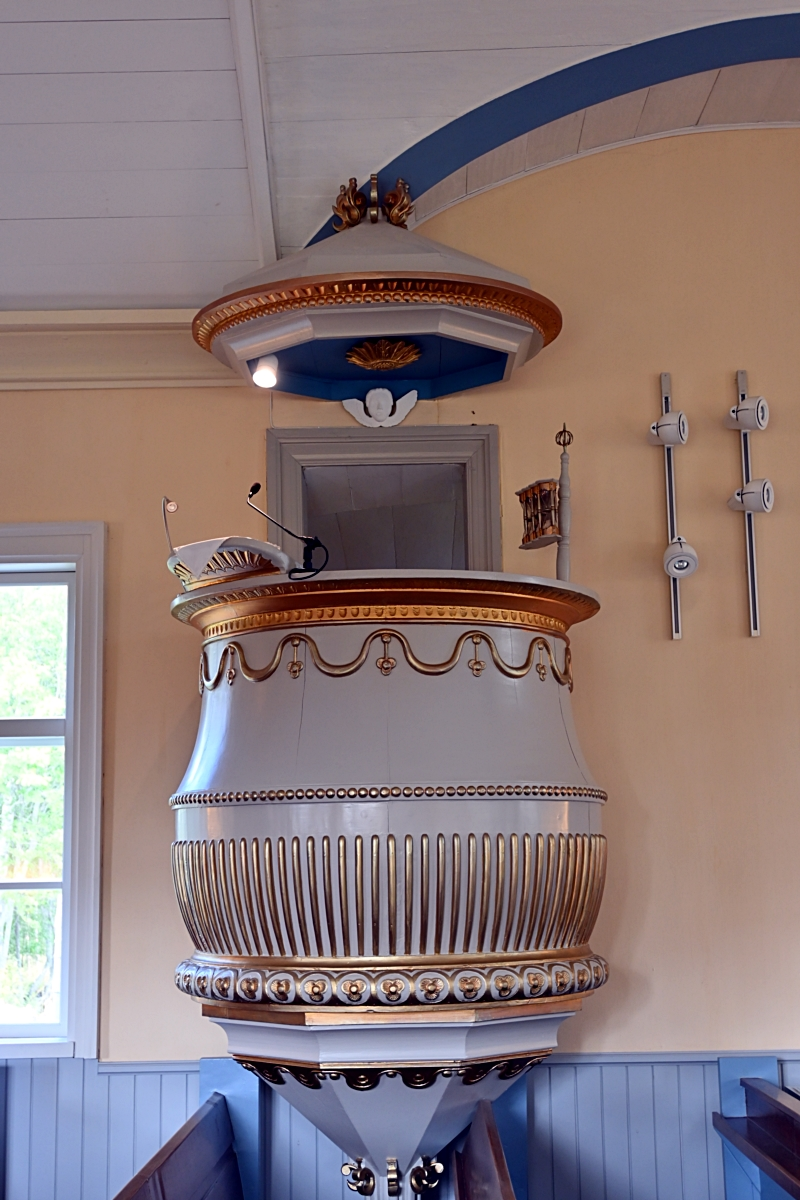
Pulpit

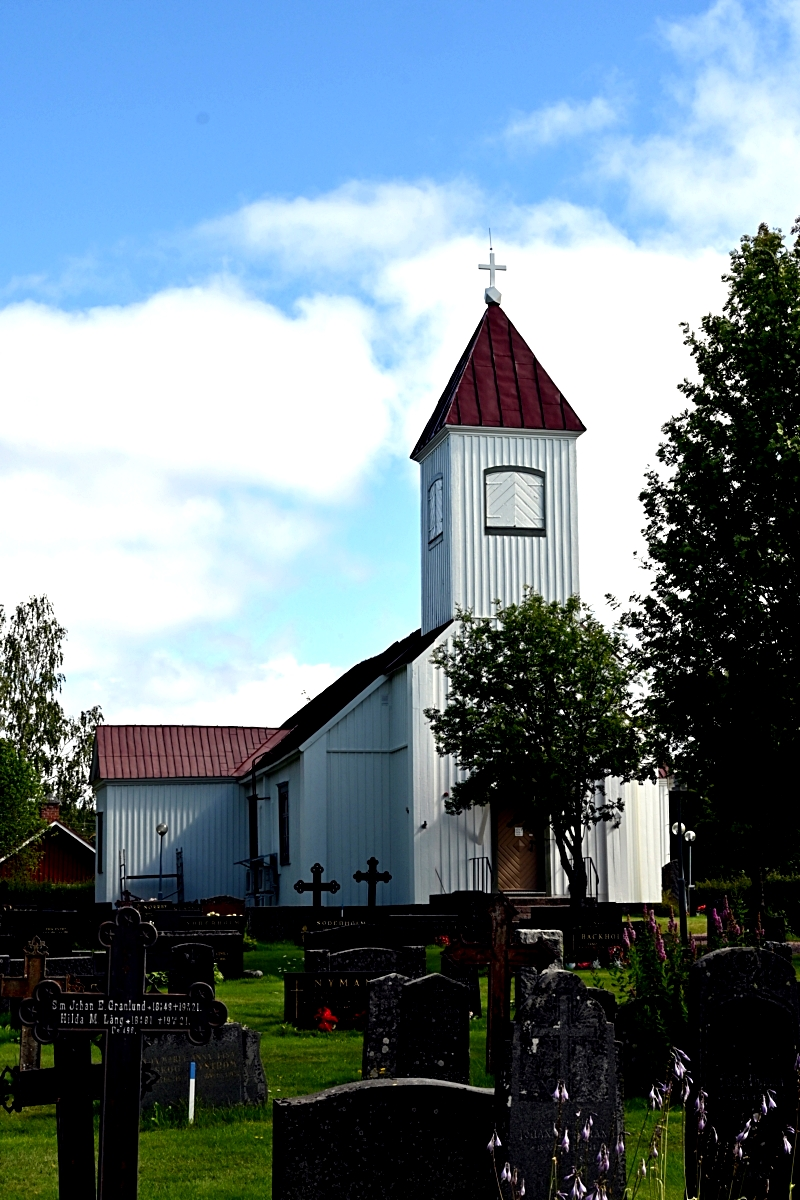
View of Bergö church from cemetery

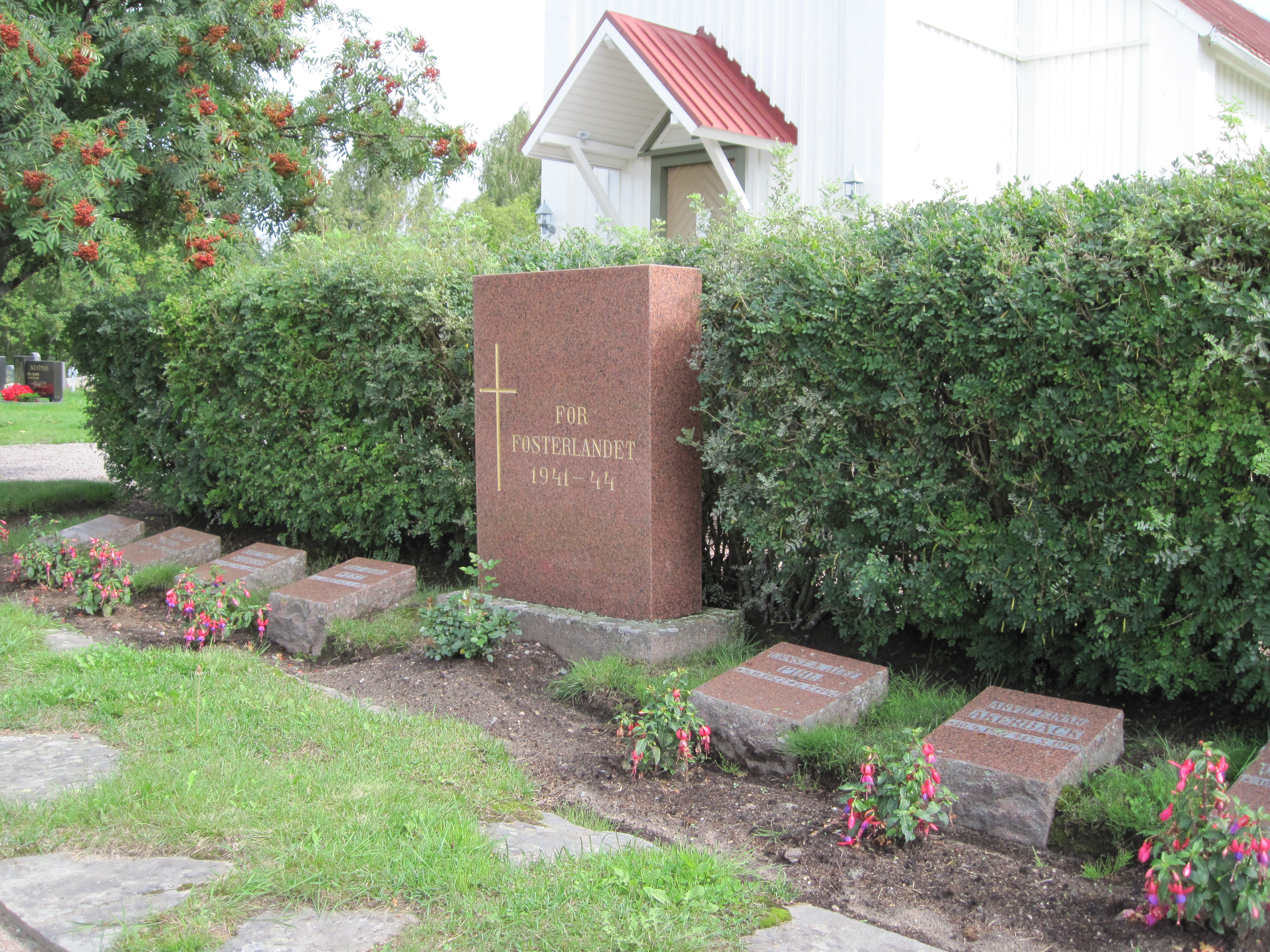
Tombs of Heroes in Bergö church cemetery

== Notable residents ==
- Albert Brommels (1891–1962), farmer and Member of Parliament

== Bibliography ==
- Anne Bergman; Katia Båsk; Carola Ekrem (2001), Bo på Bergö : människor och resurser i ett ösamhälle / Anne Bergman, Katia Båsk, Carola Ekrem ... [ja muita]., Skrifter utgivna av Svenska litteratursällskapet i Finland (in Swedish), Helsinki: Society of Swedish Literature in Finland, Wikidata Q113529990
