= Visuvesi =

- Village
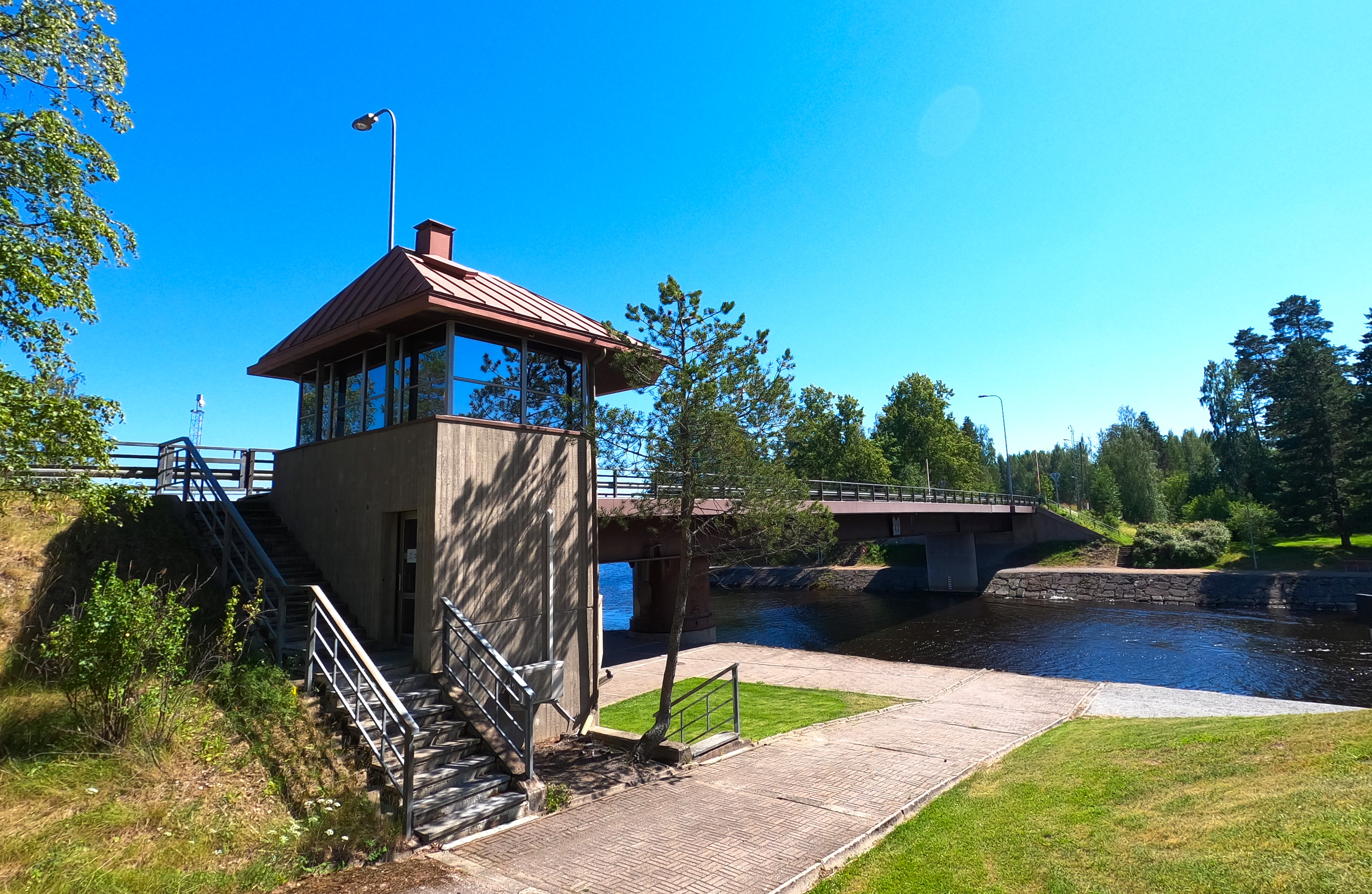
- Kaivoskanta canal in Visuvesi

- Location in Pirkanmaa
- Coordinates: 62.125°N 23.921°E
- Country: Finland
- Region: Pirkanmaa
- Sub-region: Upper Pirkanmaa
- Municipality: Ruovesi

Area
  - Land: 1.78 km^{2} (0.69 sq mi)

Population (2023)
  - Total: 267
  - Density: 150/km^{2} (390/sq mi)
- Time zone: UTC+2 (EET)
  - Summer (DST): UTC+3 (EEST)

Visuvesi is a village and urban area in Ruovesi, Finland. It is located in the northern part of the municipality between the lakes Visuselkä and Tarjanne, near the border with Virrat. The Finnish national road 66 passes through Visuvesi. As of 31 December 2023, the urban area had a population of 267.

== Etymology ==
The village of Visuvesi, sometimes known as Visukylä, is named after the lake Visuvesi or Visuselkä. According to linguist Ante Aikio, the element visu- may be of Sámi origin, derived from a cognate of Inari Sámi vaše and Skolt Sámi vââšš, both meaning 'thicket'.

== Geography ==
Visuvesi is centered on an island between the lakes Visuselkä and Tarjanne, known simply as the 'island of Visuvesi' (Visuveden saari), separated from the mainland by the Pusunvuolle strait in the north and the Kaivoskanta canal in the south. The island's terrain is mostly flat, with the exception of an esker in its western part. Visuvesi is located along the Finnish national road 66, about 18 kilometers (11 mi) away from central Ruovesi and 15 kilometers (9.3 mi) away from central Virrat. A road connecting Orivesi and Nykarleby has passed through Visuvesi since at least the 17th century. Much of the old route is still in use, however, the bridge crossing the Pusunvuolle is located further west today.

The urban area of Visuvesi, as defined by Statistics Finland, had a population of 267, an area of 1.78 square kilometers (0.69 sq mi) and a population density of 150 inhabitants per square kilometer (390/sq mi) on 31 December 2023. It covers most of the island as well as sections of the mainland immediately to its north and south along the national road 66.

== History ==
Until the late 16th century, the area of Visuvesi was hunting grounds of Hämeenkyrö. By 1589, there were three farms in the area, named Alastalo, Pusu and Jarkko, which had been established between 1547 and 1561. New farms were established as the initial ones were divided; Ylistalo was split from Alastalo before 1650, while Pusu was divided into Rantapusu and Kangaspusu before 1700. By 1775, Visuvesi comprised seven independent farms after Jarkko had been divided into Ylä-Jarkko and Ala-Jarkko, and a wholly new farm named Kaivos had been established on the mainland.

Industrialization in Visuvesi began in the 1860s with the growing economic importance of forestry, since wood could be easily transported to sawmills by water. The Kaivoskanta canal was dug between 1863 and 1864, allowing lake ships to travel between Virrat and Tampere. The first industrial enterprise in the village itself was a beer factory founded in 1874. However, the modern urban area truly began to develop in the early 20th century around the sawmill industry. In 1917, entrepreneur Elis Lahtinen bought a nearby sawmill and relocated it to Visuvesi soon afterwards. The company was known as Wisuveden Höyrysaha Elis Lahtinen & kni. until 1944, when the name was shortened to Visuvesi Oy. Plans to establish a plywood factory were made in 1940, but due to the ongoing World War II, it was not finished until 1953. There was also a second sawmill at the Aimo farm on the Vuolleniemi peninsula north of the Pusunvuolle strait, accompanied by a brick factory, from 1910 until 1968.

Despite industrialization, most of the island of Visuvesi was farmland as late as the 1960s. After the national road 66 had been renovated between 1974 and 1976, it effectively split the village center into two sections. The growth of Visuvesi began to slow down in the mid-1980s and especially after the early 1990s depression, with the population declining somewhat due to urbanization.

Visuvesi Oy was among the biggest employers in Ruovesi between the 1980s and 1990s. It was heavily affected by the 2008 financial crisis, and the sawmill and plywood factory were closed in 2011. As of 2025, the factory buildings were still standing, but had not been repurposed.

== Services ==
There is a school in Visuvesi for grades 0–6 of peruskoulu. It was established in 1891 and classes were held at the Alastalo farm until 1893, when the school acquired an old main building of the Ylistalo farm. It was replaced by a new school building in 1922, which is still in use as of 2025.

Other services include a K-Market grocery store and a community hall used for local events. A bank operated in the village from 1922 until 2009.
