= Swedish dialects in Ostrobothnia =

Linguistic variety of Swedish spoken in certain regions of Finland

Ostrobothnia on a map of Finland

Ostrobothnian Swedish (Swedish: österbottniska) is a variety of Finland-Swedish, spoken in Finland. Ostrobothnia was formerly the only Swedish-majority region of mainland Finland.

== Samples of dialects ==
Närpes-dialect recorded in 1982 by Ann-Marie Ivars (see file for transcription).

Vörå-dialect recorded in 1962 by Inga-Britt Donner.
