= Finnish national road 66 =

Road in Finland

Highway 66
- Kantatie 66 (Finnish); Stamväg 66 (Swedish)
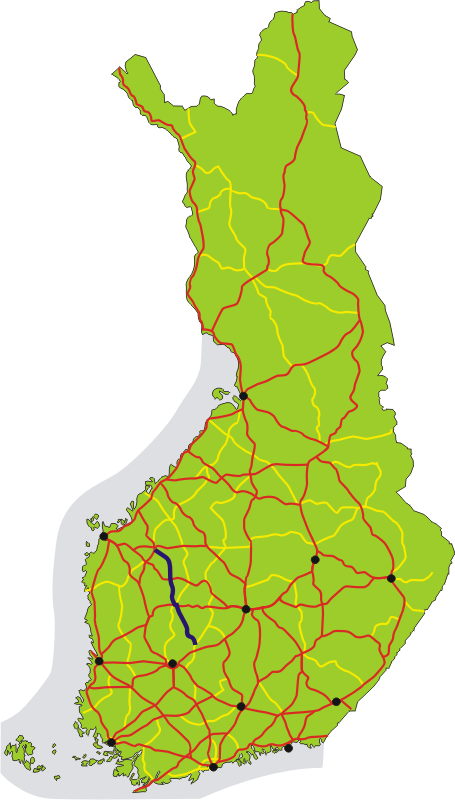

Route information
- Maintained by the Finnish Transport Agency
- Length: 182 km (113 mi)
- Existed: 1938–present

Major junctions
- From: Hirsilä, Orivesi
- To: Lapua

Location
- Country: Finland
- Major cities: Ruovesi, Virrat, Alavus, Kuortane

Highway system
- Highways in Finland
← Kt 65	→ Kt 67

The Finnish national road 66 (Finnish: Kantatie 66; Swedish: Stamväg 66) is the 2nd class main route from Orivesi to Lapua via Virrat and Alavus. The length of the road is 182 kilometres (113 mi). The road is mostly in good condition, and is used as an alternative route to the parallel Finnish national road 3. The road as a whole is two-lane. In Visuvesi, between Ruovesi and Virrat, there is a moveable bridge built in 1969. There is a road runway between Alavus and Kuortane.

== Route ==
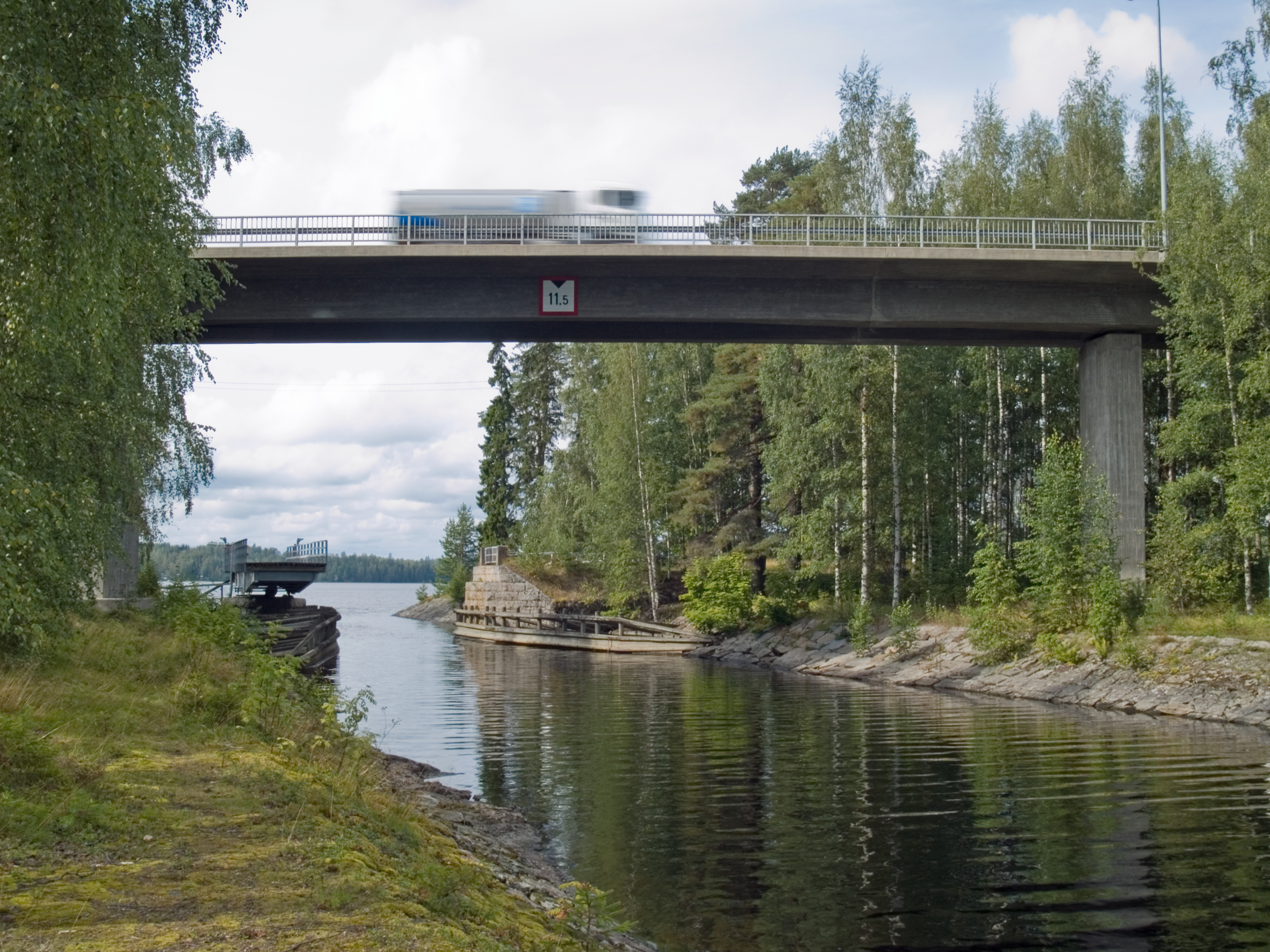
Bridge over Kauttu canal in Ruovesi.

The road passes through the following municipalities, localities in brackets:

- Orivesi
- Juupajoki (Hyytiälä)
- Ruovesi
- Virrat
- Alavus
- Kuortane
- Lapua

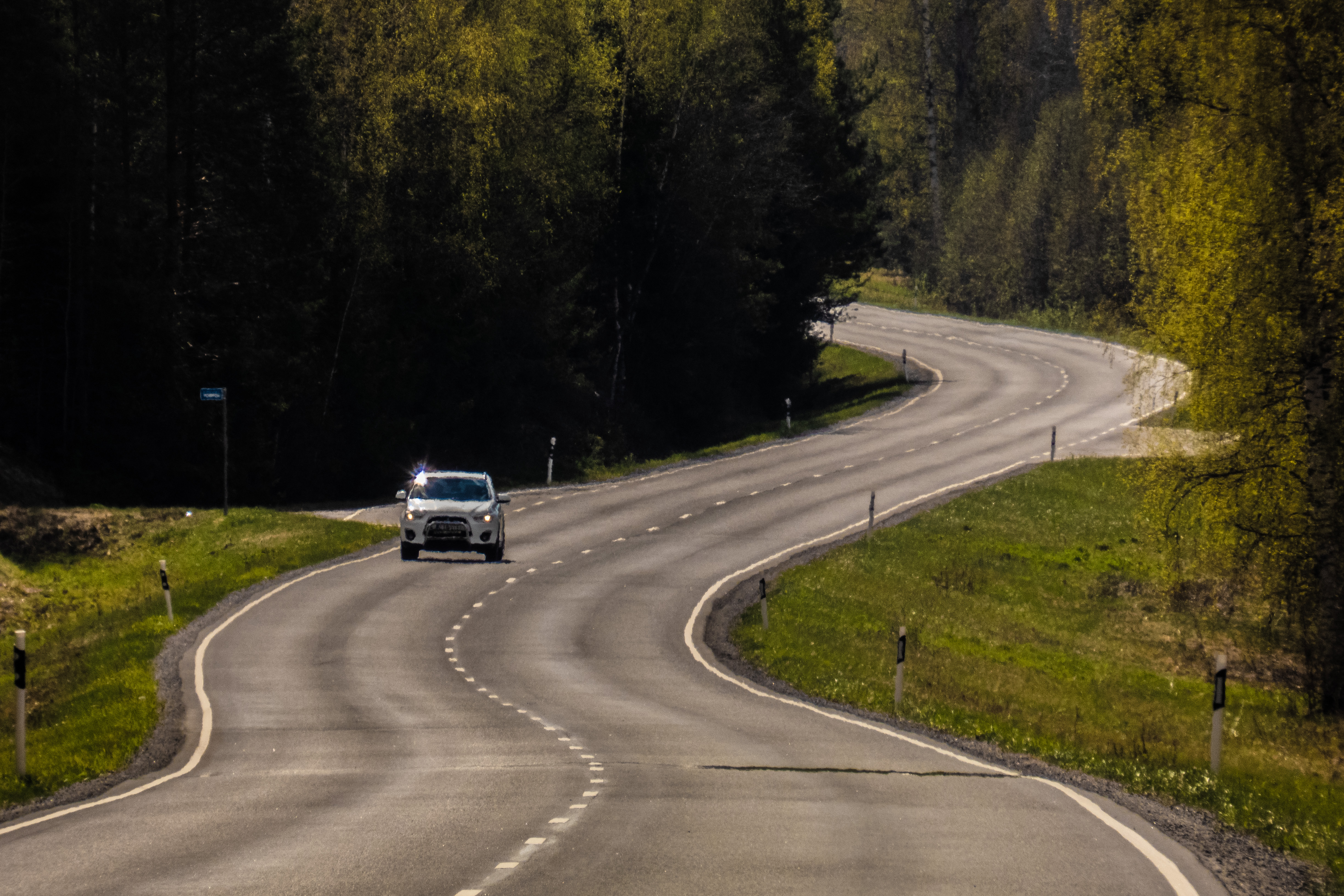
Road 66 in Ruovesi near Visuvesi.

Road 66 begins in Orivesi center on the same carriageway with Finnish national road 58 up to the Hirsilä neighborhood of Orivesi, near Höllö and north of Orivesi center, where it branches west to its own carriageway. The road continues north and goes through the western part of Juupajoki, between Korkeakoski and Hyytiälä, and continues to Ruovesi. In Ruovesi, it has intersections with road 338 in Jäminkipohja, with road 344 in Ruhala and with road 337 in Ruovesi center. Before Ruovesi center, the road passes Kauttu canal over a bridge. Before leaving Ruovesi, the road passes over Lake Visuvesi, first at a moveable bridge at Kaivoskanta canal and then over Pusunvuolle strait. The road enters Virrat at Jähdyspohja and joins the line of Finnish national road 23 in Virrat center. Along this line, the road continues four kilometers west, before separating from road 23 and turning north after Herraskylä. The road continues along the western shore of Lake Toisvesi and to Liedenpohja. At this point, it crosses over from the region of Pirkanmaa to region of Etelä-Pohjanmaa, city of Alavus, and continues to Alavus center. It crosses Finnish national road 18 in Alavus and continues north towards Kuortane. There is a road runway on the Alavus-Kuortane border. The road crosses with road 697 in Mäyry. The road passes Lake Kuortane through Kuortane center. In Mustapää, the road has an intersection with road 711. Then, the road crosses into Lapua and follows River Lapua, gradually turning from north to west to Tiistenjoki, then towards northwest towards Lapua. Entering Lapua center, the road crosses over Finnish national road 19 in Ränkimäki and ends in an intersection with Finnish national road 16 in Ritamäki.

== Traffic ==
In 2021, traffic varied between 1,300 and 4,800 vehicles per day. The most popular was the Kuortane-Alavus stretch at 3,100-4,800 vehicles per day.

== History ==
The history of the road begins in the 17th century, when Nykarleby, located in the mouth of River Lapua, was chartered as a city. The trading rights that were granted extended along the shores of River Lapua and further over the drainage divide into Ruovesi. In 1680, peasants in Lapua were ordered to construct a road from Lapua to Ruovesi. However, because of wars, the road took until the early decades of the 18th century to complete. At the same time, peasants in Orivesi agreed to build a road to Ruovesi, with the condition that Juupajoki would maintain it. The road had its current route already in the first road numbering in 1938, although the quality of the road was not yet up to modern standards. Construction of the modern road surface began in the early 1960s, and the last stretches were completed in 1985.
