= Albert Brommels =

Finnish schoolteacher, journalist and politician

Johan Albert Brommels

Member of the Parliament of Finland
- In office 6 April 1945 – 20 July 1951
- Constituency: Southern Constituency of Vaasa county

Personal details
- Born: 7 February 1891; Övermark
- Died: 15 June 1962 (aged 71); Närpes
- Political party: Swedish People's Party

Johan Albert Brommels (7 February 1891 - 15 June 1962) was a Finnish schoolteacher, journalist and politician.

== Background ==
He was born in Övermark. His father was Johan Henrik Brommels and his mother was Ulrika Wilhelmina med Mickelsdotter. He was married to Anna Olivia Stenfors in 1915 and had 4 kids. He started as a school teacher by profession. He taught the elementary school in Vörå from 1914 -1915, primary school in Bergö from 1915 -1922 and again elementary school in Närpes from 1922 -1955.

He later worked as postman (1915 -1920) and as locksmith (1915 - 1921) in Bergö. As a journalist, he worked as an editor at Vasa-Posten in 1920 and from 1956 to 1960 in Kaskö Tidning and Syd-Österbotten.

== Career ==
He was a member of the Parliament of Finland from 1945 to 1951, representing the Swedish People's Party of Finland (SFP). When he served in Parliament, he was a member of the Committee on Education and of the Committee on Economic Affairs. He represented the southern constituency of Vaasa County. He was a presidential elector in 1950 and 1956 and also held positions of trust in Bergö and Närpes Municipal Council. Other positions of trust that he held were as chairman to Southern Ostrobothnia Teacher's Association and as secretary of Southern Ostrobothnia Song and Music Association. Lastly, he also held a position of trust at the Central Board of the Finnish Association of Swedish Primary School Teachers.
