= Malax =

Malax Malax – Maalahti
- Municipality
- Malax kommun Maalahden kunta
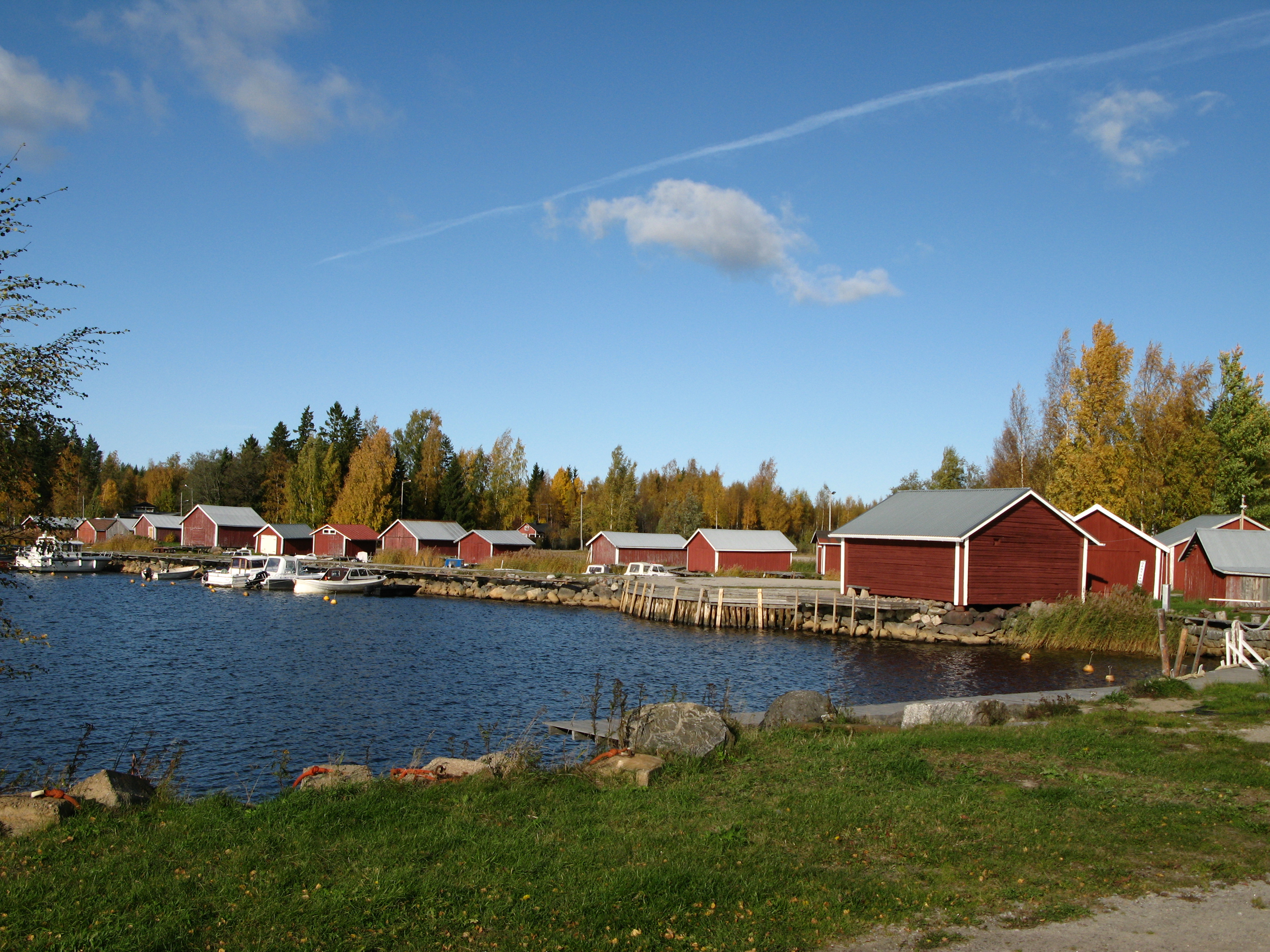

- Coat of arms

- Location of Malax in Finland
- Interactive map of Malax
- Coordinates: 62°56.5′N 021°33′E
- Country: Finland
- Region: Ostrobothnia
- Sub-region: Vaasa
- Charter: 1607

Government
  - Municipal manager: Jenny Malmsten

Area (2018-01-01)
  - Total: 1,954.94 km^{2} (754.81 sq mi)
  - Land: 522.11 km^{2} (201.59 sq mi)
  - Water: 1,433.95 km^{2} (553.65 sq mi)
  - Rank: 169th largest in Finland

Population (2025-12-31)
  - Total: 5,392
  - Rank: 160th largest in Finland
  - Density: 10.33/km^{2} (26.8/sq mi)

Population by native language
  - Swedish: 84.4% (official)
  - Finnish: 9.2% (official)
  - Others: 6.4%

Population by age
  - 0 to 14: 15.2%
  - 15 to 64: 56%
  - 65 or older: 28.8%
- Time zone: UTC+02:00 (EET)
  - Summer (DST): UTC+03:00 (EEST)
- Website: www.malax.fi/en/

Malax (Finland Swedish: [ˈmɑːlɑks]; Finnish: Maalahti, Finnish pronunciation: [ˈmɑːˌlɑhti]) is a municipality in Finland, located on the west coast of the country. Malax is situated in Ostrobothnia, along the Gulf of Bothnia. The population of Malax is approximately 5,000, while the sub-region has a population of approximately 112,000. It is the 160th most populous municipality in Finland.

Malax covers an area of 1,954.94 square kilometres (754.81 sq mi) of which 1,433.95 km^{2} (553.65 sq mi) is water. The population density is 10.33 inhabitants per square kilometre (26.8/sq mi).

Malax is a bilingual municipality with Finnish and Swedish as its official languages. The population consists of 9% Finnish speakers, 84% Swedish speakers, and 6% speakers of other languages.

== Name ==
The town's Swedish name has been recorded as Malax (by) and Madelax (by), beginning in the 15th century. The name is incorrectly attributed to various Finnish sources, but most likely the name stems from a Proto-Germanic *Madwōlaguz ("meadow lake, wet meadow"). All old place names in the region derive from Proto-Germanic, with some having an unknown origin, and only modern place names derive from Swedish or Finnish. "Några österbottniska vattennamn" by Ralf Norrman provides a basic hypotheses for many of the older place names through comparison with established study of old Germanic place names. Two common elements include -lax (from PG. *laguz "water, lake") and -ne (from PG. *nebą or *nibją "wetland").

Ostrobothnia has been experiencing post-glacial rebound with previously wet and underwater surface being raised, consequently most of the old place names in Ostrobothnia are hydronyms at or near to coastal areas settled by prehistoric people. The remainder are place names related to worship, settlement, or simply irregular. As you move closer to the current coastline you see more Old Norse and Swedish names, and if you move inland you find Finnish names. As the people have not migrated and remained isolated until modern times, the old toponymy of Ostrobothnia is limited to a strip of land from north to south where these people would have settled after the migration period. Some contact has been had with Finnic and Samic tribes, as evident from certain place names in either language family, along with linguistic evidence of loaning from Proto-Germanic into Finno-Samic.

Similar place names include Helne, Helene (*Haljōnibją "Hel's wetland"), Kalarsar (*kaliz "cold" and potentially *saiwiz, *saiwaz > *sār "sea, water"), Telsar (*þelô "frost"), Vias (*wīhą "sanctuary"), Petalax (*Piþanlaguz "pith-lake"), Pixne, Kolne (potentially *kōlaz "cool"), Närpes (*narhwiz "scar", referring to the river and potentially loaned through Finnish, cf. *arwiz>arpi), and many more. Olaus Magnus' Carta Marina from 1539 potentially shows Malax listed as "Vesikylä" ("water town"), which would have been the older Finnish name for the town and likely in reference to a wet meadow.

Due to political interest and tension the status of Ostrobothnian languages and toponymy is often undermined and ignored.

== Language ==
The spoken language of Malax (Malax mål), Korsnäs, and Närpes (an estimated native population of 10,000) makes up the southern language of Ostrobothnian and preserves many archaic features. It also bears some similarity to other East Norse languages such as Westrobothnian and Dalian, and superficially some with Gutnish and Icelandic. One prominent feature is the preservation of the archaic diphthongs ai [ɑ̟j], au [ɒ̟w], and ay [ɒ̟ɥ], although their spelling may vary due to a lack of standardisation. A literal spelling based on Klockars-Hagback is the most common form of writing, but other stricter and more etymological writing systems exist. Due to a lack of standardisation and teaching Finland Swedish has influenced the language in modern times and in particular vocabulary and some parts of inflection has slowly eroded.

=== Status ===
As late as the 1900s these languages was called skovelsvenska ("shovel Swedish") by the ruling upper class, considered vulgar and uncivilised, and discouraged from use in any domain, similarly to how regional languages in Sweden were considered speech impediments and something to have removed from society. Some of the older generations may still feel a need to switch to Finland Swedish when meeting someone they feel is of a higher status.

Swedish is not the native language of the native population, but it is the official language by law and due to political reasons how things are classified and census data gathered. Children learn Swedish in school, from kindergarten through primary school, as their supposed native language contrary to linguistic reality. There are no classes and no courses in the native language, thus slowly eroding it in favour of Finland Swedish. Despite the European Charter for Regional or Minority Languages there is no formal protection for any of the East Norse languages in Finland, and no formal allowance for teaching, as they are not formally recognised and simply classified as Swedish dialects.

=== Features ===
Some notable features in a more etymologically derived writing system which deviates from the colloquial one (each speaker writes how he speaks), and with vestibular nasal shown with a superscript m:

- Short vowel a [ɑ]: lang, mang, sang, stand, þrang, vald
  - with allophonic sonorant lengthening [ɑː]
- Long vowel ā [oɑ]: blā, fāᵐ, nār, svār
  - with assimilation [bɽoːɑ]: blāa
  - with assimilation and allophonic syllabic shortening [bɽɒːtː~bɽɒtː]: blātt
- Long vowels ī [ej], ȳ [ɵɥ], ū [ɵw], ō [ow]: bīt, bȳt, būk, bōk
- Diphthongs ai [ɑ̟j], au [ɒ̟w], ay [ɒ̟ɥ], iu [ɵɥ]: bain, dauf, day, diur, hail, laus, lays, niu, raud, rayk, siun, stain
- Dissimilation of ml [mbɑ̟ɽ], mr [mbɑ̟ẓ], nl [ndɑ̟ɽ], nr [ndɑ̟ẓ], lr [ldɑ̟ẓ]: fallr, finnr, gaml, minnr, saml, sâmr, tænnr, timr
- Breaking of PG. *e as ja [jɑ̟] and ia|ē [ɘɑ̟]: bjar (*beraną), knē (*knewą), kviat (*kwetwą), miag (*mek), skjar [*skeraną], þiag (*þek), þiatᵐ (*þinhtaz)
  - with assimilation [kn̥ɘːɑ]: knēa
  - with assimilation and allophonic syllabic shortening [tɑ̟ːtː~tɑ̟tː]: þiatt
- Thick l [ɽ] (subapical retroflex): blā, flat, hard, kljauf (compare languages in Sweden and Norway)
- Soft r [ẓ] (apical retracted): aldr, bītr, stôrr, tænnr, værr (contrast and use varies)
- Soft s [s̱] (laminal retracted): āsᵐ, hūs, vīs (contrast and use varies)
- A subtle difference in laminal [t] and apical [d] (contrast and use varies)
  - potentially influenced by *t *d *þ and how they merged
- Vestibular nasals that can occur in the speech of older generations
- Vestibular past forms from class 7 strong verbs: fâgᵐ|fâᵐ [fɘɑ̟g~fɘɑ̟ɣ|fɘɑ̟] < *fifā(h)ᵐ < *fefanh, gâgᵐ|gâᵐ [ɣɘɑ̟g-ɣɘɑ̟ɣ|ɣɘɑ̟] < *gigāgᵐ < *gegang (with allophonic vestibular nasals)
- Retracted post-alveolars (also called retroflexes): rn, rt, rd, rs, rl
- Sonorant lengthening before m n l r: all, damb, finn, hand, stamm, tann
- Affricatives: pj [pç], bj [bʝ], tj [tɕ], dj [dʑ], kj [cç], gj [ɟʝ]
- Affricatives: spj [spç], stj [stɕ~ɕ], skj [scç~ç]
- Archaic mb: damb, kamb, lamb, vamb
- Illustratives: han, hun, hit (Sv. det), þai (Sv. de), þāᵐ (Sv. då), nār (Sv. när), hjar (inessive), hjanna (adessive), hid|hidr, þid|þidr, mig (from PG. *mik), miag (from PG. *mek), þali [tɑɽe~tɒɽe] (from þa līk, rounding may be due to the old feminine) ("such kind, that kind of"), þadde [tɑdːe~tɒdːe] (from þat þænna) ("such kind like there"), it [et~ɑ̟t] (dual), þal(i)dænna (from þa līk þænna), þær fyri (Sv. därför)
- Unusual forms or words: fray|frô (*fraiwą), plīt (to write), snayg|snôg (*snaiwaz), vī (*wīhaz)

=== Writing system ===
There are three categories of writing systems for the Ostrobothnian family, consisting of the linguistic, colloquial, and etymological systems. Linguistic systems have been used in various wordlists and basic documentations of the languages and varies between researchers, some using IPA, some using their own transcriptions, some using colloquially derived systems, and some even using Swedish transcription. Colloquial systems can vary between language, region, and person, but is for the most part written how it is pronounced by the speaker. Due to a lack of standardisation and teaching, even with colloquial systems both pronunciation and grammar has suffered and what is correct may vary between individual. Etymological systems attempt to study the languages in-depth and both synchronically and diachronically in order to derive underlying processes, sounds, and forms, deriving a writing system that accounts for most dialectal variation while maintaining an etymologically appealing system.

Northern Ostrobothnian (as in grundsprååtsi) has standardised a colloquial system and is able to maintain a stable language. Southern Ostrobothnian has two major colloquial systems that lack standardisation (the two poles of Malax and Närpes), and as such may vary between speakers, but a native will be able to decipher such writing and easily learn its orthography. These two colloquial systems often forego underlying processes and etymological features in favour of literal transcription, thus producing the variation between speakers, and does not always account for some of the older inflection. A third, etymological, system exists as used in this article whereby all underlying processes, stems, and inflectional systems are attempted to have documented and standardised. Such a systems still allows for variation, but favour a singular standardised and more archaic language as the one to be taught with dialectal and individual variation explain through mostly regular processes.

== Politics ==
Results of the 2011 Finnish parliamentary election in Malax:

- Swedish People's Party 82.7%
- Social Democratic Party 7.8%
- Christian Democrats 2.9%
- Finns Party 2.5%
- Centre Party 1.5%
- National Coalition Party 0.9%
- Left Alliance 0.8%
- Green League 0.3%
