= Kaskinen =

Kaskinen Kaskinen (Finnish) Kaskö (Swedish)
- Town
- Kaskisten kaupunki Kaskö stad
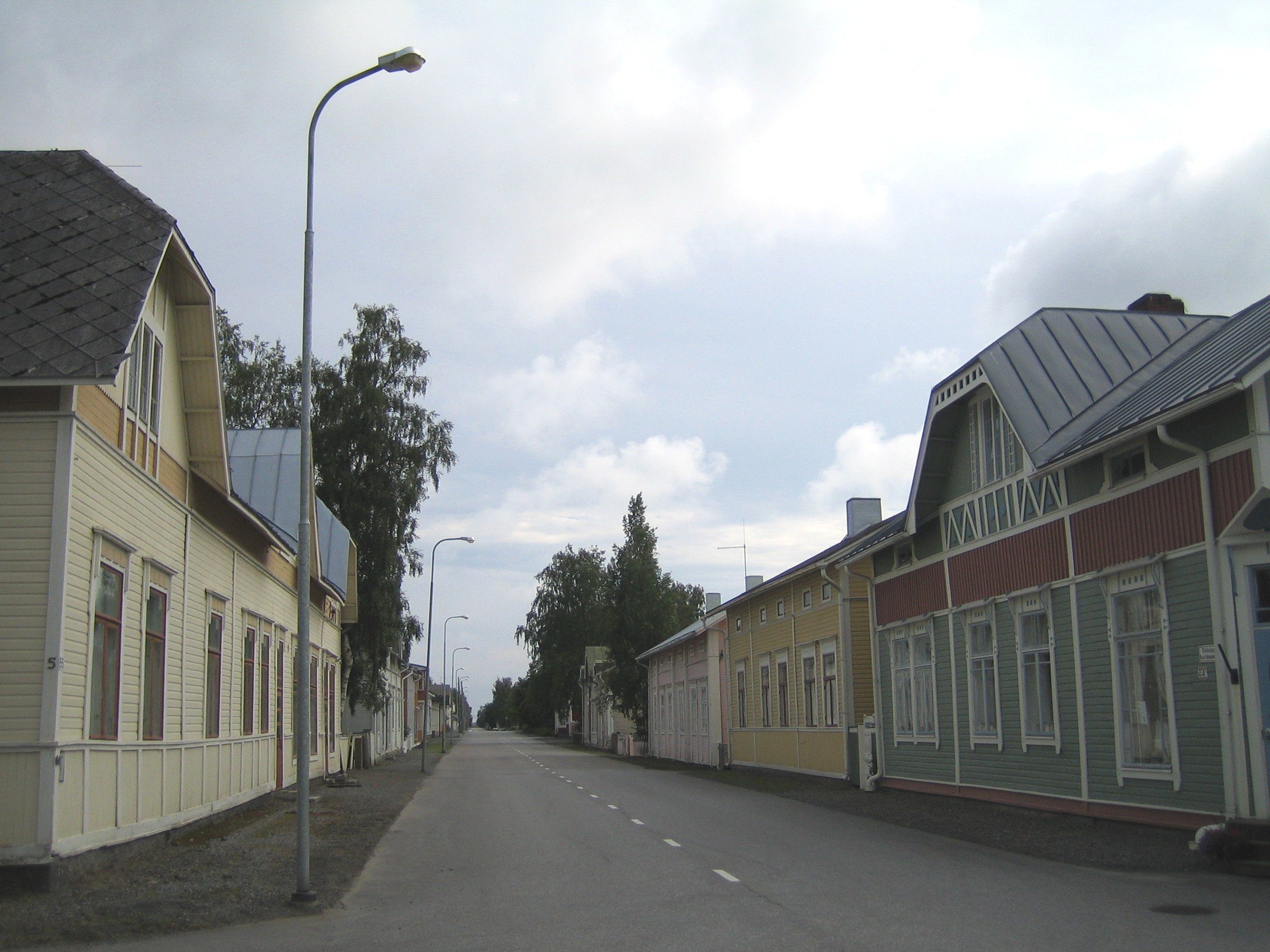
- Kaskinen

- Coat of arms

- Location of Kaskinen in Finland
- Interactive map of Kaskinen
- Coordinates: 62°22′N 021°15′E
- Country: Finland
- Region: Ostrobothnia
- Sub-region: Sydösterbotten
- Founded: 1785

Government
  - Town manager: Markku Lumio

Area (2018-01-01)
  - Total: 175.36 km^{2} (67.71 sq mi)
  - Land: 10.64 km^{2} (4.11 sq mi)
  - Water: 164.87 km^{2} (63.66 sq mi)
  - Rank: 312th largest in Finland

Population (2025-12-31)
  - Total: 1,248
  - Rank: 284th largest in Finland
  - Density: 117.29/km^{2} (303.8/sq mi)

Population by native language
  - Finnish: 53.7% (official)
  - Swedish: 27% (official)
  - Others: 19.3%

Population by age
  - 0 to 14: 11.2%
  - 15 to 64: 47.1%
  - 65 or older: 41.7%
- Time zone: UTC+02:00 (EET)
  - Summer (DST): UTC+03:00 (EEST)
- Unemployment rate: 65%
- Website: kaskinen.fi

Kaskinen (Finnish: [ˈkɑskinen]; Swedish: Kaskö) is a town and island in Finland, located on the west coast of the country. Kaskinen is situated in Ostrobothnia, along the Gulf of Bothnia. The population of Kaskinen approximately 1,000, while the sub-region has a population of approximately 17,000. It is the 284th most populous municipality in Finland.

Kaskinen covers an area of 10.64 km^{2} (4.11 sq mi) (excluding sea areas) of which 0.16 km^{2} (0.062 sq mi) is inland water (1 January 2018). The population density is 117.29/km^{2} (303.8/sq mi).

Kaskinen is a bilingual municipality with Finnish and Swedish as its official languages. The population consists of 54% Finnish speakers, 27% Swedish speakers, and 19% speakers of other languages, which is well above the national average.

Kaskinen is the smallest municipality in Finland with town status. The town is located on an island with two bridges to the mainland, and its only border neighbor is the town of Närpes. The townscape of Kaskinen consists of uniform wooden construction. Even though it is planned mainly as a port town, the Suupohja Railway also runs from the town to the Ostrobothnian Railway to Seinäjoki. Today, however, the railway is only used for freight traffic, mainly for the Port of Kaskinen.

The paddle appearing in the coat of arms of Kaskinen describes the excellent natural harbor that has influenced the establishment of the town in its place. The laurel leaf may have been intended to refer to flowering, but its origin may also be in the name of the Bladh family (Swedish: blad, "leaf"); Two members of the family – father and son – acquired both city rights and township status for the village at that time. The coat of arms has been redrawn by A. W. Rancken (1880–1954) based on the old coat of arms, which was originally confirmed on 9 April 1793.

== Etymology ==
The older name forms of Kaskinen island found in the documents are Kaskisöyen (1546), Casköö (1553), Kaskisöö (1573) and the later Kaskin or Kyperäsaari (1844). Although the oldest known written mention of the name Kaskinen for the town dates back to 1863, the name in Finnish is original. This is also indicated by the fact that in old Swedish island names, the body of the name is Kaskis-, to which the explanatory ending -ö has been added, which means island in Swedish. The most likely interpretation of the island's original name is Kaskisaari ("Slash-burn island"), because the slash-and-burn agriculture has therefore been practiced on the island in the early days.

== History ==
The town was founded in 1785 on an island by King Gustav III of Sweden and since then it has been one of the most important harbours of Finland. In the 18th century, a town plan with long, straight and wide streets was drawn up for the town, and the plan prepared for a clearly larger population; however, even today, there are still many undeveloped estates in the town, and the urban settlement hardly extends beyond the original zoned area.

The rise of the new town was slow in the 19th century, primarily due to poor transport connections. The bridge to the mainland was completed in 1828. As a maritime town, Kaskinen fell behind Kristinestad and Vaasa. Until the 19th century, fishing and trading were the most important livelihoods. During the heyday of the Finnish sailing fleet on both sides of the middle of the 19th century, especially tar and timber were exported from Kaskinen. The town's merchant fleet was at its largest the size of 12 sailing ships. After the era of sailing ships, coastal traffic as well as freight and passenger traffic to Sweden was practiced in the town by steamships.

On 18 November 2019, Kaskinen and Närpes voted for a municipal merger, but Kaskinen's town council voted 9–8 to reject the consolidation.

== Economy ==
In 2015, there were 479 jobs in the municipality. 5.2% of them were in primary production (agriculture, forestry and fisheries), 39.7% in processing and 53.7% in services. The share of processing was higher than in the whole country (20%). In 2016, the companies that paid the most corporate tax were Oy Sonnfish Ab, Kuivaniemen Kala Oy and Kaskitek Oy.

The town includes the Port of Kaskinen, which deals with cargo transport.

== Demographics ==
The following diagram shows the population development of the town every five years since 1990:

Kaskinen's population growth in 1990–2020
Year	Population
1990	1,780
1995	1,596
2000	1,564
2005	1,482
2010	1,429
2015	1,285
2020	1,278
Source: Statistics Finland.

== Government ==
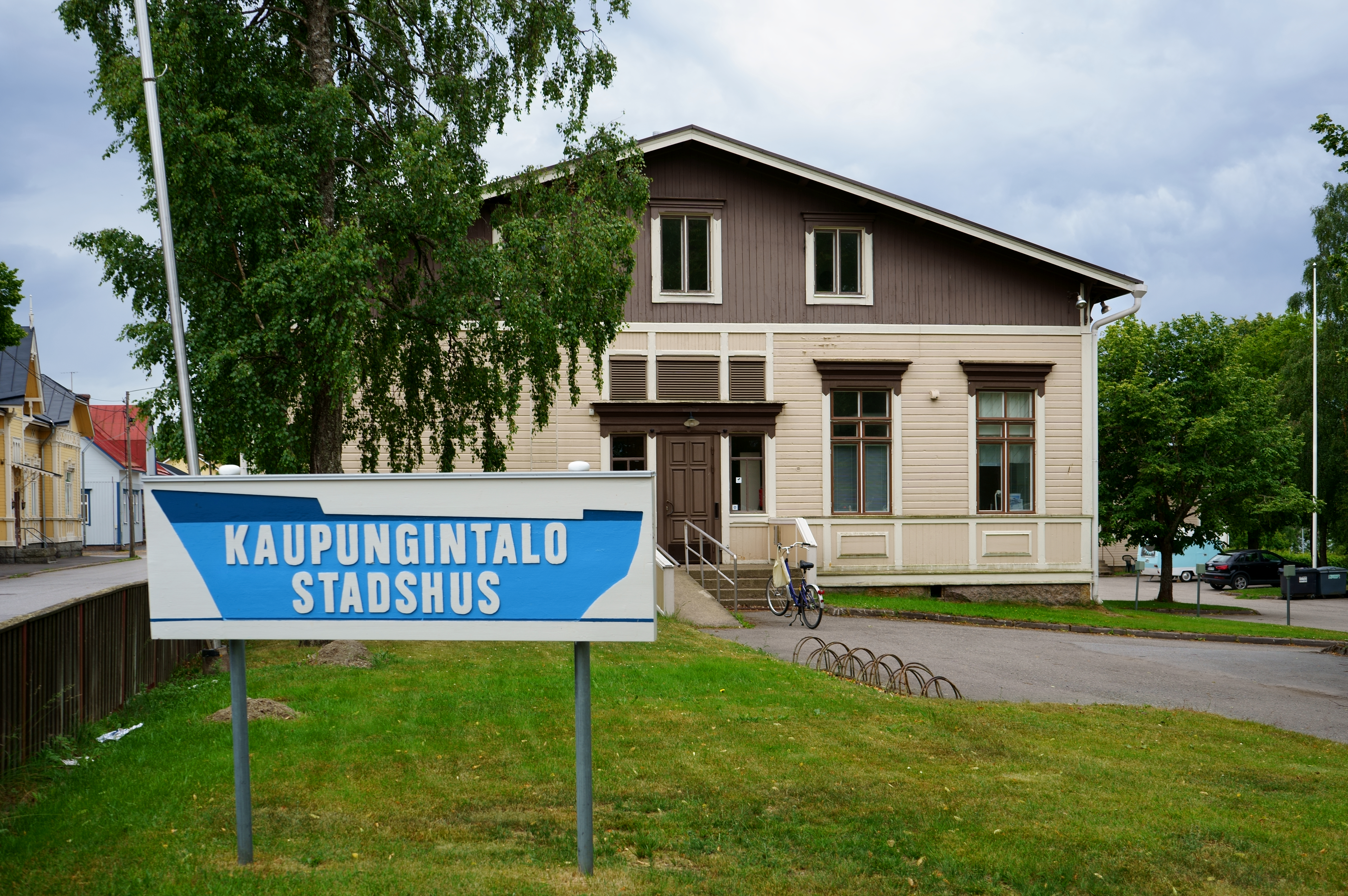
Kaskinen Town Hall

At the end of 2017, Minna Nikander was elected the town manager of Kaskinen.

=== Politics ===
The two major parties in Kaskinen are SFP and SDP, which form the majority in elections and in the council. Below are the percentages of support for the parliamentary elections based on the votes cast in the most recent municipal elections:

- Swedish People's Party 28.8%
- Social Democratic Party 27.0%
- True Finns 21.4%
- National Coalition Party 12.9%
- Left Alliance 6.7%
- Green League 3.0%

== Culture ==
=== Food ===
Gubbe ronka or gubbe runka, mashed potato containing salted Baltic herring, served with mashed lingonberry and melted butter, was named as Kaskinen's traditional parish dish in the 1980s.

== Notable people ==
- Rosina Heikel (1842–1929), medical doctor and feminist
- Karl F. Sundman (1873–1949), mathematician
- Krista Siegfrids (born 1985), pop singer
- Sune Mangs (1932–1994), actor

== Gallery ==
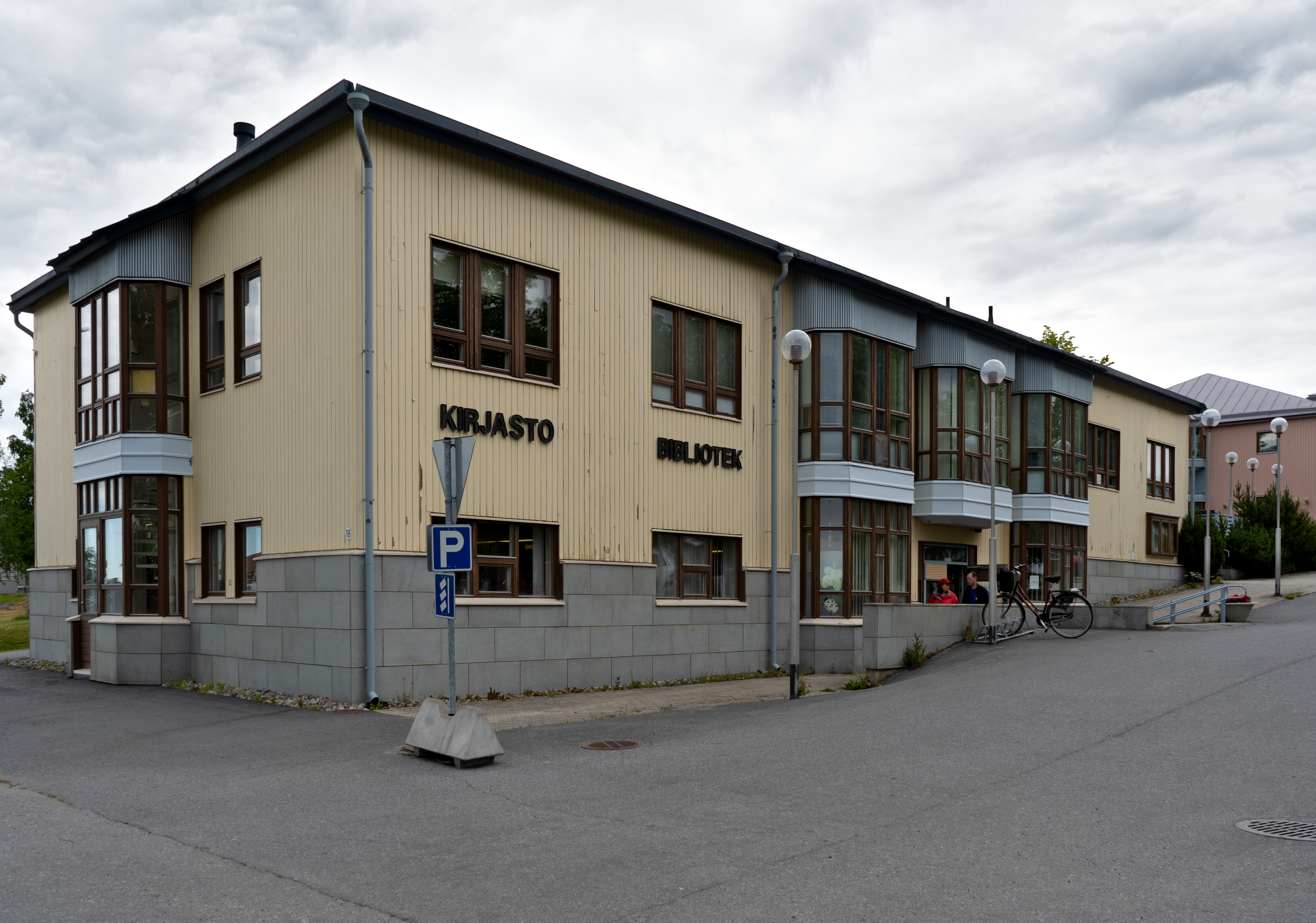
Kaskinen Library

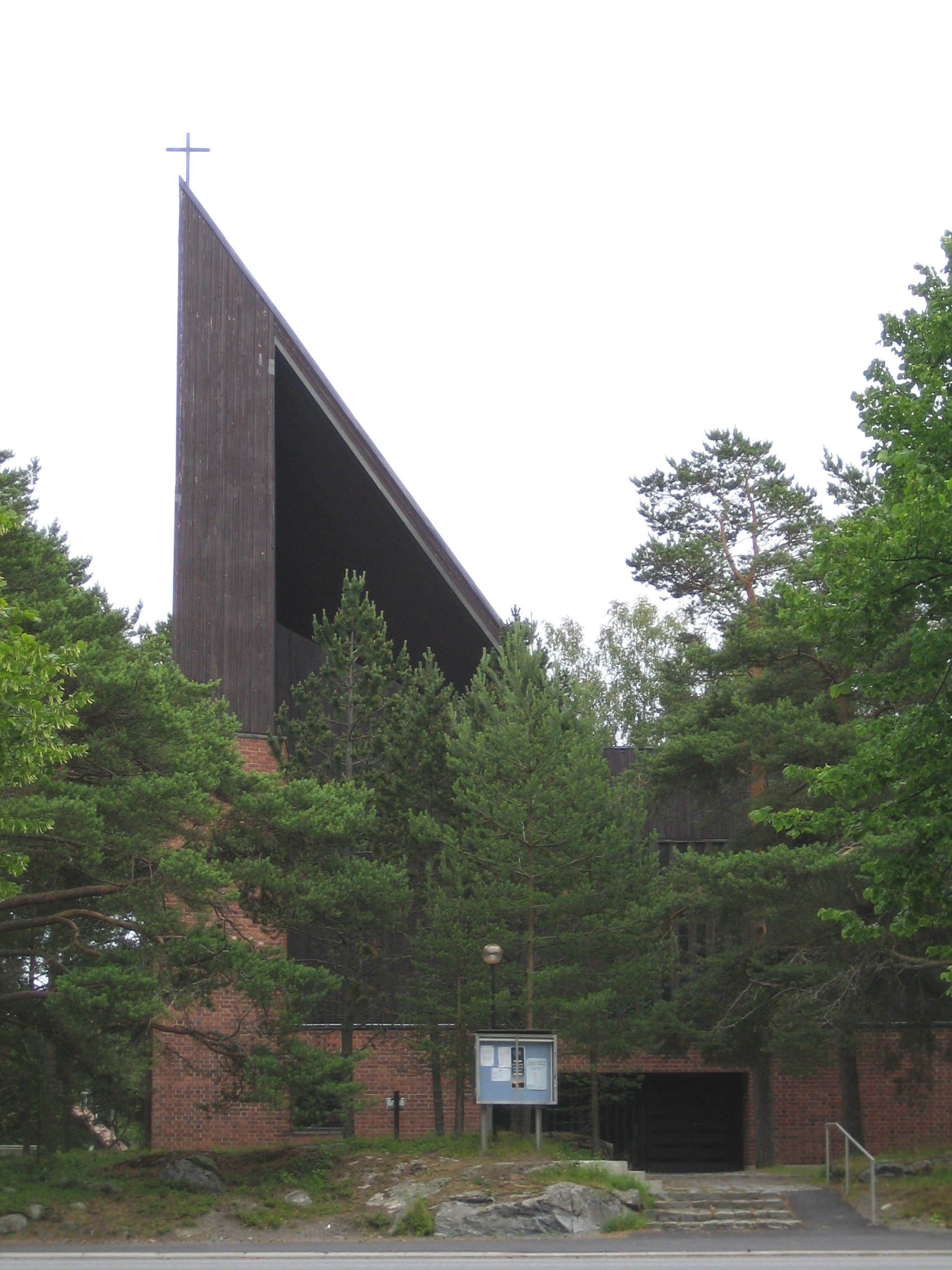
Kaskinen Church

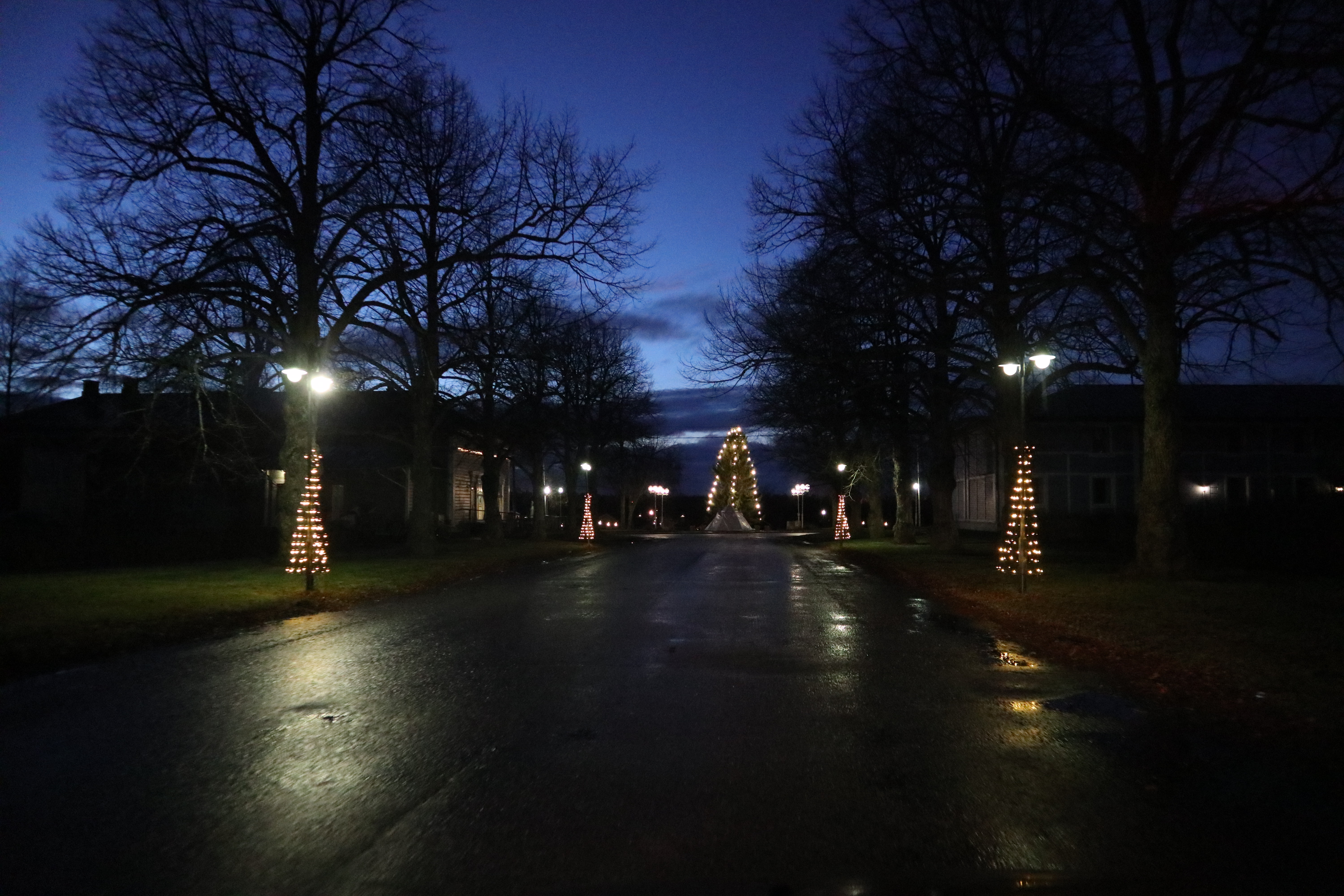
King Gustav Square (Finnish: Kuningas Kustaan aukio)

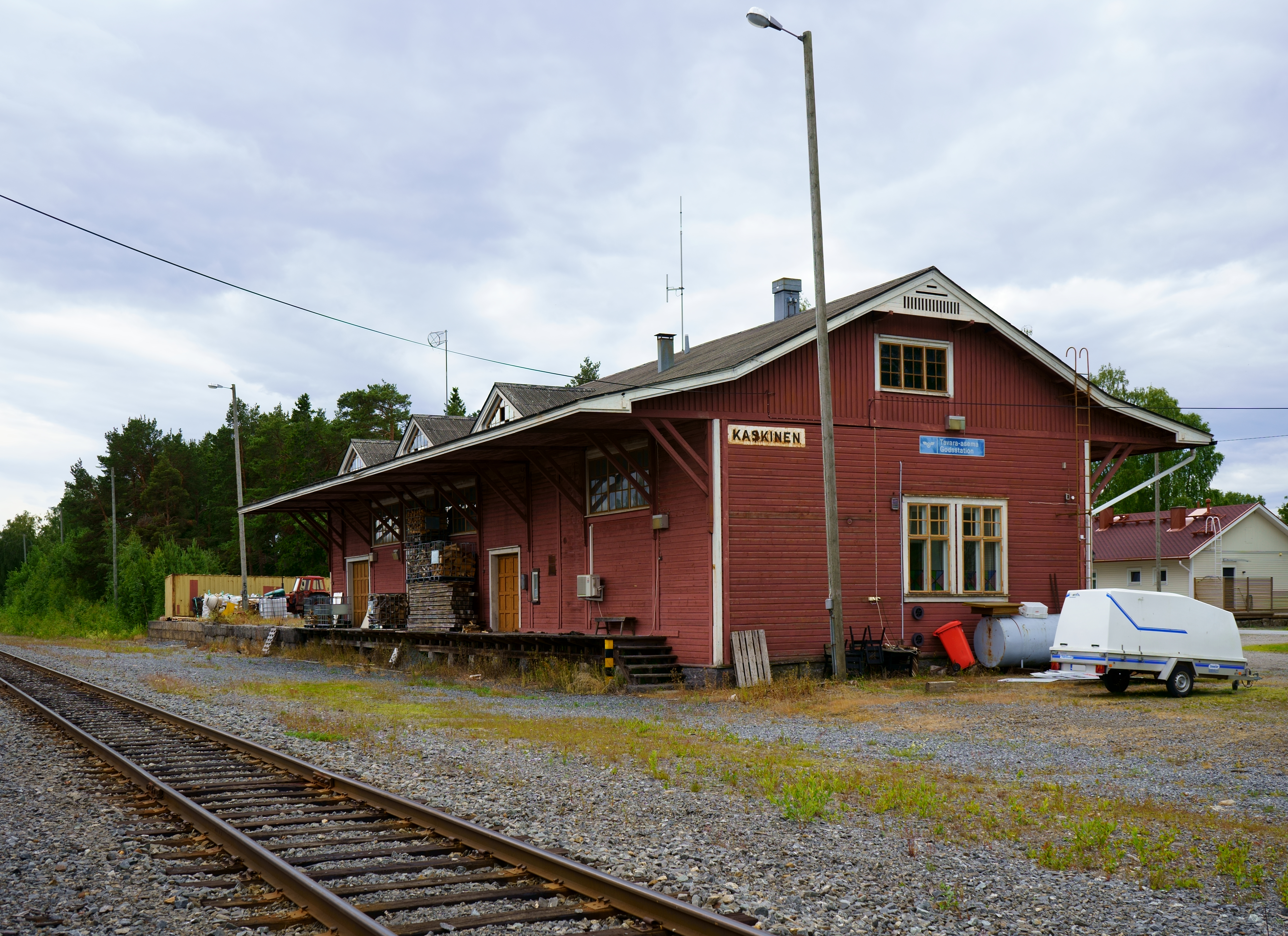
Old freight station of Kaskinen

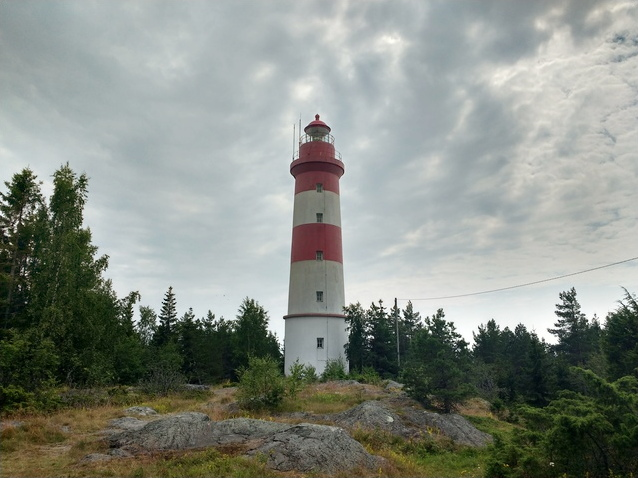
Sälgrund Lighthouse

== See also ==
- Närpes
- Kristinestad
