= Ostrobothnia (administrative region) =

Region of Finland

Coordinates: 63°N 22°E

Ostrobothnia Österbotten (Swedish) Pohjanmaa (Finnish)
- Region
- Region of Ostrobothnia; Landskapet Österbotten; Pohjanmaan maakunta
- Coat of arms

- Ostrobothnia on a map of Finland
- Country: Finland
- Historical province: Ostrobothnia
- Capital: Vaasa
- Other towns: Jakobstad, Kaskinen, Kristinestad, Närpes and Nykarleby

Government
  - Regional Mayor: Mats Brandt

Area
  - Total: 7,583.17 km^{2} (2,927.88 sq mi)
  - Land: 7,403.20 km^{2} (2,858.39 sq mi)
  - Water: 179.97 km^{2} (69.49 sq mi)

Population (31 December 2025)
  - Total: 179,555
  - Density: 24.2537/km^{2} (62.8168/sq mi)
- Time zone: UTC+2 (EET)
  - Summer (DST): UTC+3 (EEST)
- ISO 3166 code: FI-12
- NUTS: FI19A
- Regional bird: Common swift (Apus apus)
- Regional fish: Common whitefish (Coregonus lavaretus)
- Regional flower: European meadowsweet (Filipendula ulmaria)
- Website: www.obotnia.fi/en/

Ostrobothnia (Swedish: Österbotten; Finnish: Pohjanmaa) (Note: Finnish pronunciation: [ˈpohjɑnˌmɑː]; Finland Swedish: Finland Swedish pronunciation: [ˈøsːtærˌbotːen]; Sweden Swedish: Swedish pronunciation: [ˈœsːtærˌbɔtːɛn].) is a region on the west coast of Finland. It borders Central Ostrobothnia, South Ostrobothnia and Satakunta, and faces the Gulf of Bothnia. The regional capital and largest city is Vaasa. The region comprises 14 municipalities and had 179,555 inhabitants at the end of 2025. Ostrobothnia occupies the central part of the Swedish-speaking coastal area of mainland Finland. Swedish was the registered mother tongue of 49.1% of the population in 2025, Finnish of 39.4%, and other languages of 11.5%; Swedish was therefore the largest language group but no longer an absolute majority. Thirteen of its municipalities are bilingual in Finnish and Swedish, while Laihia is Finnish-speaking. The name Coastal Ostrobothnia is sometimes used to distinguish the region from the much larger historical province of Ostrobothnia. The landscape is low-lying and strongly shaped by post-glacial rebound. The Kvarken Archipelago, which contains thousands of islands and extensive De Geer moraine fields, forms the Finnish part of the transnational High Coast / Kvarken Archipelago UNESCO World Heritage Site. Ostrobothnia is also one of Finland's most industrial and export-oriented regions, with a major concentration of energy-technology companies in and around Vaasa.

== Name and symbols ==
Before the names of Finland's modern regions were confirmed, the area was also known as Vasa kustregionen in Swedish and Vaasan rannikkoseutu in Finnish, both meaning "the Vaasa coastal region". The Institute for the Languages of Finland recommended the names Kustösterbotten and Rannikko-Pohjanmaa ("Coastal Ostrobothnia"), but the government confirmed Österbotten and Pohjanmaa on 26 February 1998 in accordance with the preference of the regional authorities. The decision referred to the region's strong Swedish-language character and the absence of agreement on an alternative name. Among Swedish speakers the region is sometimes informally called Pampas, a reference to its extensive flat landscapes and the Pampas of South America. The regional tree is the black alder (Alnus glutinosa), the regional mammal is the European elk (Alces alces), the regional stone is Vaasa granite, and the regional song is the "March of Vaasa" (Swedish: Vasamarschen; Finnish: Vaasan marssi).

=== Coat of arms ===
The arms are blazoned: Gules, a sheaf Or; on a chief counterchanged four ermines courant two and two. The golden wheatsheaf on a red field is the emblem of the House of Vasa, which ruled Sweden and Finland in the 16th and 17th centuries. The ermines derive from the arms of the historical province of Ostrobothnia and refer to the historical fur trade. Their number represents the traditional division of the area into four sub-regions.

== History ==
=== Early settlement and the Middle Ages ===
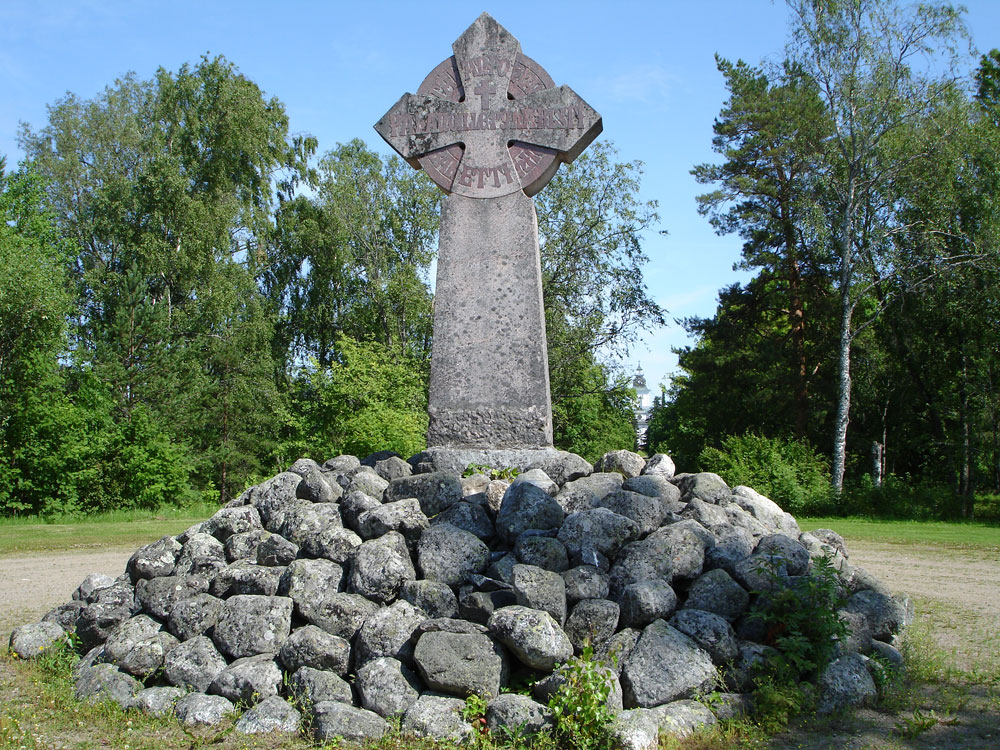
Memorial cross at the site of Korsholm Castle

During the pre-Christian period, the coast of present-day Ostrobothnia was sparsely populated and a substantial part of the modern forest and agricultural land was still below sea level. Early permanent settlement developed in the lower valley of the Kyrönjoki, around present-day Vörå, with settlement also established in the Pedersöre and Munsala areas during the early Christian era. Korsholm and Pedersöre are regarded as among the earliest parishes in the area, dating from the 13th century. Närpes emerged as a parish during the following century, and settlement expanded along the coastal river valleys. Migration from Sweden intensified in the late 13th and early 14th centuries and contributed to the establishment of the Swedish-speaking coastal settlement that remains characteristic of the region. The region contains three medieval stone churches: the churches of Närpes and Pedersöre, which remain in use, and the ruins of St Mary's Church in Old Vaasa.

=== Administrative development ===
Korsholm Castle was established in the late 14th century and became an administrative centre for a wide northern area of the Swedish realm. Medieval Swedish sources initially used the name Östernorrland for the area; the name Österbotten came into use during the 15th century. Korsholm Castle County was separated from Västerbotten in 1441, although the castle itself fell out of use by the early 16th century. Vaasa was founded in 1606 near the old castle and church sites. During the administrative reforms of the 1630s, the centre of the larger province shifted northwards to Oulu. In 1775–1776 the southern part of the province was organised as Vaasa Province, and the Vaasa Court of Appeal was established. The modern administrative region represents only the central coastal part of historical Ostrobothnia. Its boundaries have changed through municipal mergers and transfers; most recently, Isokyrö moved from Ostrobothnia to South Ostrobothnia at the beginning of 2021.

== Geography ==
Ostrobothnia lies along the Gulf of Bothnia from the northern part of the Bothnian Sea, across the Kvarken, to the southern part of Bothnian Bay. It has 7,403.20 km^{2} (2,858.39 sq mi) of land and 179.97 km^{2} (69.49 sq mi) of inland water. The marine areas assigned to the region cover a further 10,250.92 km^{2} (3,957.90 sq mi), giving an area of 17,834.09 km^{2} (6,885.78 sq mi) when sea areas are included.

=== Landforms and geology ===
The terrain rises gently inland from the coast and has relatively small local height differences. Much of the landscape consists of former seabed exposed by post-glacial land uplift. Around the Kvarken, the land has risen at about 0.9 m (3.0 ft) per century during the last 10,500 years, continually creating new islands and changing bays into lakes and wetlands. One of the best-known local heights is Pyhävuori in Kristinestad, at 129 m (423 ft) above sea level. Granodiorite and quartz diorite dominate the bedrock from south of Vaasa to north of Jakobstad. Farther south, towards Närpes, the bedrock includes migmatitic gneiss crossed by granite veins. Moraine is the most widespread surface deposit; the Vaasa area is particularly known for boulder-rich moraine, and the Replot area contains extensive fields of ribbed De Geer moraines. South of Vaasa, Söderfjärden is a circular impact structure approximately 5 to 6 km (3.1 to 3.7 mi) in diameter. Cambrian sandstone and clay occur beneath its surface deposits, which are locally more than 70 m (230 ft) thick.

=== Rivers and coast ===
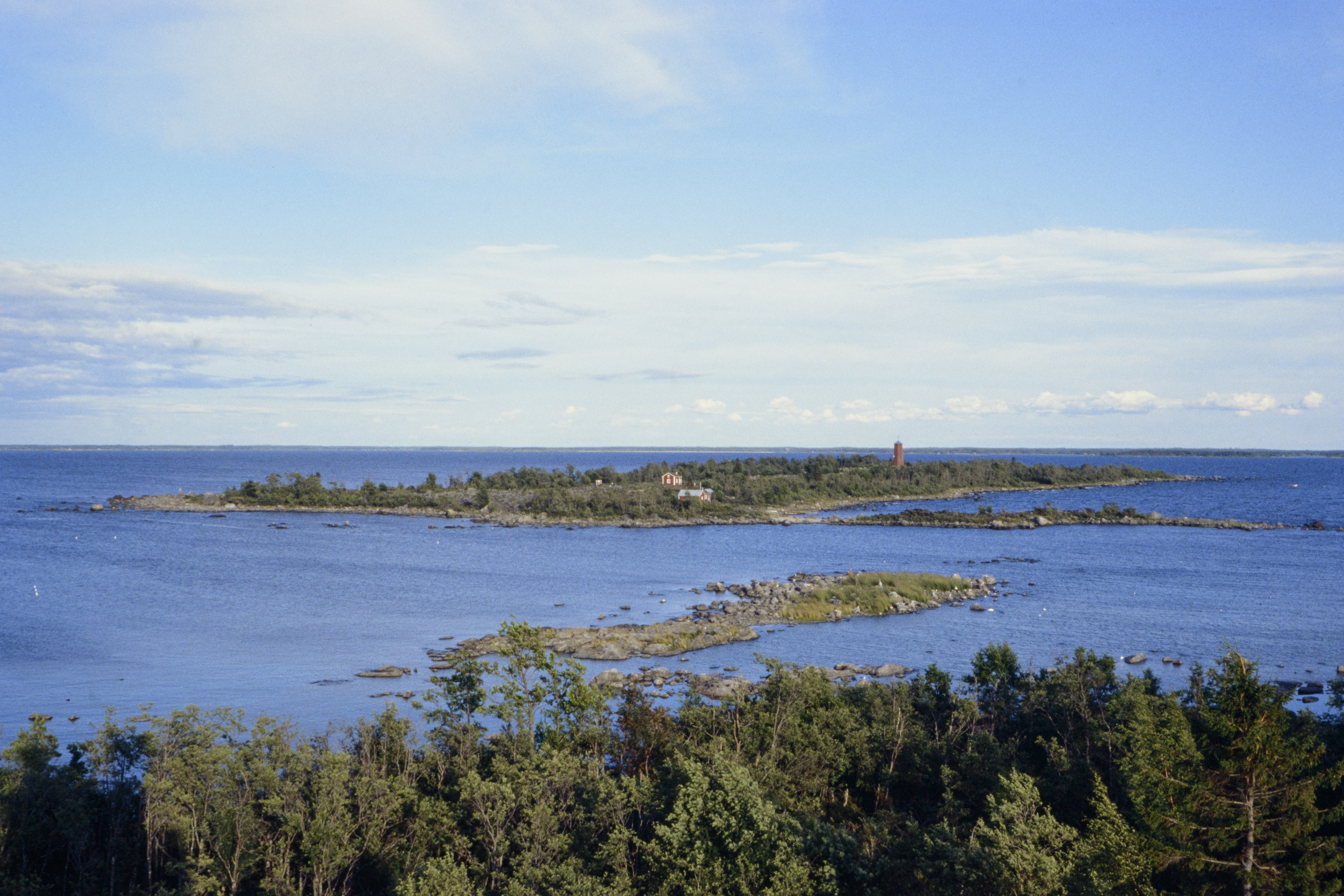
View from the Stubben lighthouse in Nykarleby

All major rivers in the region drain into the Gulf of Bothnia. From south to north they include the Lapväärttinjoki, Teuvanjoki, Närpes River, Malax River, Laihianjoki, Kyrönjoki, Oravais River, Lapuanjoki, Purmo River, Ähtävänjoki and Poras River. The lower reaches of the Kyrönjoki, Lapuanjoki and Närpes River are particularly susceptible to flooding. The coast is deeply indented and accompanied by a broad, shallow archipelago. The largest islands in the Vaasa archipelago include Replot, Björköby, Bergö and Köklot. Farther offshore are groups such as Rönnskären, the Mickelsörarna and the Valsörarna. Near Jakobstad, the Eugmo and Larsmo islands are connected by roads, while the archipelagos off Kaskinen and Kristinestad consist mainly of smaller islands. The Kvarken Archipelago was added to UNESCO's World Heritage List in 2006 as an extension of Sweden's High Coast site. UNESCO identifies the area's rapid glacio-isostatic uplift and its approximately 5,600 islands, shallow bays, moraine ridges and boulder fields as features of exceptional geological value.

=== Climate and natural environment ===
Ostrobothnia lies near the transition between humid continental and subarctic climate zones. The Gulf of Bothnia delays spring and early summer along the immediate coast, but keeps coastal autumns milder than inland areas. Westerly airflows crossing the Scandinavian Mountains can produce comparatively dry and mild foehn conditions. The coastal region is among the drier parts of Finland. Norway spruce is the dominant tree in much of the coastal forest zone, with deciduous-rich and herb-rich forests occurring more often in the south. Coastal wetlands, shallow bays and uplift forests form a succession of habitats as land emerges from the sea. The coastal waters are important for fishing; Baltic herring, whitefish, perch, pike and bream are among the characteristic species.

== Municipalities ==
Ostrobothnia consists of 14 municipalities, six of which have city status. For statistical purposes they are divided into the Vaasa, Jakobstad and Sydösterbotten sub-regions. The Regional Council of Ostrobothnia is a statutory joint municipal authority formed by all 14 municipalities.

=== Map of municipalities ===
Cities and municipalities of Ostrobothnia.

=== Sub-regions ===
Vaasa sub-region

- Korsnäs
- Laihia (Swedish: Laihela)
- Malax (Finnish: Maalahti)
- Korsholm (Finnish: Mustasaari)
- **Vaasa** (Swedish: Vasa)
- Vörå (Finnish: Vöyri)

Jakobstad sub-region

- Kronoby (Finnish: Kruunupyy)
- Larsmo (Finnish: Luoto)
- Pedersöre (Finnish: Pedersören kunta)
- **Jakobstad** (Finnish: Pietarsaari)
- **Nykarleby** (Finnish: Uusikaarlepyy)

Sydösterbotten sub-region

- **Kaskinen** (Swedish: Kaskö)
- **Kristinestad** (Finnish: Kristiinankaupunki)
- **Närpes** (Finnish: Närpiö)

=== List of municipalities ===
The six municipalities with city status are shown in bold. Population and language data in the table are transcluded from the corresponding municipality data templates.

Coat of arms	Municipality	Population	Land area (km²)	Density (per km²)	Finnish speakers	Swedish speakers	Other languages
Coat of arms of Jakobstad	**Jakobstad**	19,657	89	222	30%	53%	17%
Coat of arms of Kaskinen	**Kaskinen**	1,248	11	117	54%	27%	19%
Coat of arms of Korsholm	Korsholm	19,792	849	23	28%	68%	4%
Coat of arms of Korsnäs	Korsnäs	1,984	236	8	4%	83%	13%
Coat of arms of Kristinestad	**Kristinestad**	6,113	683	9	39%	52%	9%
Coat of arms of Kronoby	Kronoby	6,268	713	9	19%	75%	5%
Coat of arms of Laihia	Laihia	7,534	505	15	97%	1%	2%
Coat of arms of Larsmo	Larsmo	5,955	143	42	5%	92%	4%
Coat of arms of Malax	Malax	5,392	522	10	9%	84%	6%
Coat of arms of Närpes	**Närpes**	9,538	978	10	5%	73%	23%
Coat of arms of Nykarleby	**Nykarleby**	7,391	733	10	6%	84%	10%
Coat of arms of Pedersöre	Pedersöre	11,289	794	14	8%	88%	4%
Coat of arms of Vaasa	**Vaasa**	71,209	365	195	62%	23%	15%
Coat of arms of Vörå	Vörå	6,185	782	8	12%	81%	7%
Total		179,555	7,403	24	39%	49%	11%

== Demographics ==
=== Population ===
Population, 1990–2025
Year	Population
1990	167,108
1995	168,888
2000	168,077
2005	168,583
2010	172,981
2015	176,894
2020	175,816
2025	179,555

The population grew modestly during the 1990s and 2000s, reached almost 177,000 in 2015, declined during the latter half of the 2010s, and then rose to 179,555 by the end of 2025. The largest population concentration is the Vaasa urban area; Jakobstad is the principal centre in the north, while Närpes, Kristinestad and Kaskinen serve the southern part of the region.

=== Languages ===
Ostrobothnia is the only region of mainland Finland in which Swedish is the largest registered mother tongue. Its share has gradually declined as the proportion of residents with other mother tongues has increased. In 2025, 49.1% of residents were Swedish-speaking, 39.4% Finnish-speaking and 11.5% had another registered mother tongue.

Registered mother tongue, selected years
Year	Swedish	Finnish	Other languages
1990	55.5%	44.1%	0.4%
2000	54.0%	44.5%	1.5%
2010	52.2%	43.7%	4.1%
2020	50.7%	41.9%	7.5%
2025	49.1%	39.4%	11.5%

Swedish predominates in many rural and coastal municipalities, while Finnish is the largest language in Vaasa and Laihia. The region's Swedish dialects belong to the Ostrobothnian dialect group and differ considerably between the southern, central and northern coastal areas.

=== Housing ===
At the end of 2024, 52.0% of the region's household-dwelling units were in detached houses, 36.8% in apartment buildings and 11.2% in terraced houses. One-person households accounted for 40.7% of all household-dwelling units and two-person households for 33.4%.

=== Religion ===
Most residents traditionally belong to the Evangelical Lutheran Church of Finland, but Ostrobothnia has also been an important area for Lutheran revival movements and Protestant free churches. Baptist and Methodist congregations became established particularly around Vaasa and Jakobstad, while Pentecostalism, the Swedish-speaking branch of Laestadianism, and the Swedish Lutheran evangelical movement have also had a significant regional presence.

== Economy ==
Ostrobothnia has an export-oriented economy with a comparatively large manufacturing sector. Important industries include energy technology, electrical equipment, machinery, metal products, marine and boatbuilding industries, food processing and agriculture.

=== Energy technology and manufacturing ===
The Vaasa area contains a major concentration of companies working in electricity generation, power transmission, automation, marine energy systems and energy efficiency. EnergyVaasa, the cluster organisation, describes it as the largest energy-technology hub in the Nordic countries. As of 2026, it reported more than 180 companies, approximately 13,000 employees, annual turnover exceeding €6 billion and an export share of about 80%. The cluster includes multinational industrial companies, small and medium-sized suppliers, higher-education institutions and public-sector organisations. The Jakobstad area has a strong concentration of boatbuilding, marine equipment and specialised manufacturing. Metalworking, component production and food industries are distributed throughout the region, and the ports of Vaasa, Kaskinen and Jakobstad support industrial exports.

=== Agriculture and food production ===
Agriculture remains important in the rural parts of the region. The flat former seabed provides extensive cultivated areas, while specialised production includes greenhouse vegetables around Närpes, seed and food potatoes in the southern municipalities, pig husbandry and fur farming. Närpes is especially associated with commercial greenhouse cultivation, while food processing links agricultural production with the region's manufacturing and export economy.

== Culture ==
The culture of Ostrobothnia reflects its bilingual population, coastal settlement and long connections across the Gulf of Bothnia to Sweden. Swedish-language institutions, newspapers, theatres, schools and associations have a prominent role, while Vaasa is a major centre for both Finnish- and Swedish-language culture. Local identity is also expressed through distinctive dialects, village traditions, seafaring, fishing and the flat agricultural landscape. Traditional folk music has a particularly strong position in parts of the region, including the Swedish-speaking districts around Vörå, Nykarleby and Jakobstad. The regional song is the "March of Vaasa", and the informal regional name Pampas is widely used in cultural and student contexts.

== Politics and administration ==
The Regional Council of Ostrobothnia is responsible for regional development, regional land-use planning and the representation of common municipal interests. It is governed through cooperation among the region's 14 municipalities. For elections to the Parliament of Finland, Ostrobothnia forms part of the Vaasa electoral district together with Central Ostrobothnia and South Ostrobothnia. In the 2023 parliamentary election the district elected 16 of Parliament's 200 members.

== See also ==
- Finnish national road 8 (E8)
- High Coast / Kvarken Archipelago
- Ostrobothnia (historical province)
- Swedish dialects in Ostrobothnia
- Swedish-speaking population of Finland

== Sources ==
- Rikkinen, Kalevi; Sihvo, Hannes (1986). Finlandia: Otavan iso maammekirja 7: Etelä-Pohjanmaa (in Finnish). Helsinki: Otava. ISBN 951-1-08930-7.
