= Närpes =

Närpes Närpes (Swedish) Närpiö (Finnish)
- Town
- Närpes stad Närpiön kaupunki
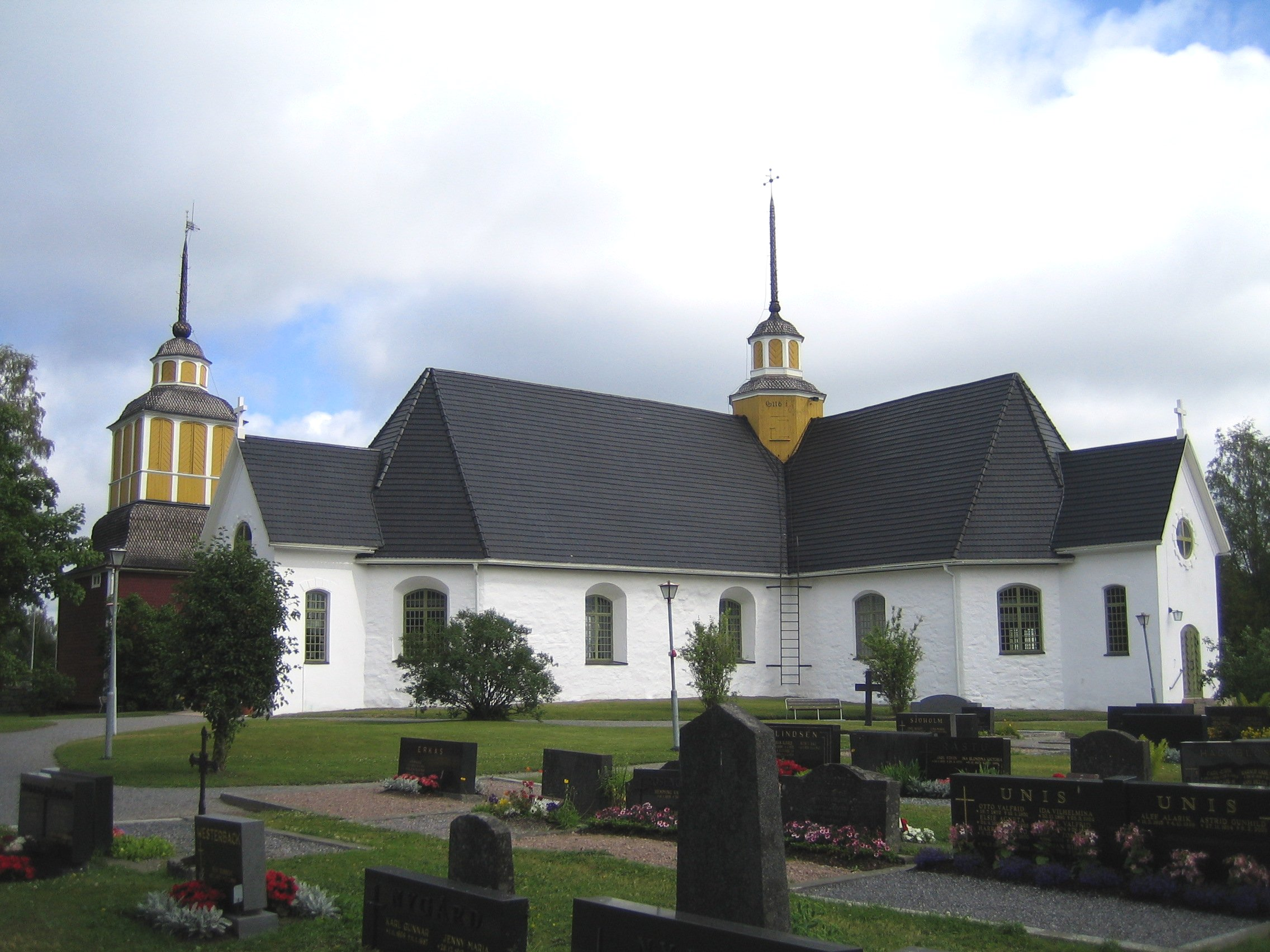
- Närpes Church

- Coat of arms

- Location of Närpes in Finland
- Interactive map of Närpes
- Coordinates: 62°28′N 021°20′E
- Country: Finland
- Region: Ostrobothnia
- Sub-region: Sydösterbotten
- Charter: 1867
- City rights: 1993

Government
  - City manager: Mikaela Björklund

Area (2018-01-01)
  - Total: 2,334.14 km^{2} (901.22 sq mi)
  - Land: 977.82 km^{2} (377.54 sq mi)
  - Water: 1,357 km^{2} (524 sq mi)
  - Rank: 80th largest in Finland

Population (2025-12-31)
  - Total: 9,538
  - Rank: 101st largest in Finland
  - Density: 9.75/km^{2} (25.3/sq mi)

Population by native language
  - Swedish: 72.6% (official)
  - Finnish: 4.8% (official)
  - Others: 22.5%

Population by age
  - 0 to 14: 15.8%
  - 15 to 64: 55.5%
  - 65 or older: 28.7%
- Time zone: UTC+02:00 (EET)
  - Summer (DST): UTC+03:00 (EEST)
- Website: www.narpes.fi

Närpes (Finland Swedish: [ˈnærpːes]; Finnish: Närpiö [ˈnærpiø]) is a town in Finland, located on the west coast of the country. Närpes is situated in Ostrobothnia, along the Gulf of Bothnia. The population of Närpes is approximately 10,000, while the sub-region has a population of approximately 17,000. It is the 101st most populous municipality in Finland.

Närpes covers an area of 2,334.14 square kilometres (901.22 sq mi) of which 1,357 km^{2} (524 sq mi) is water. The population density is 9.75 inhabitants per square kilometre (25.3/sq mi). Economically, the municipality is known for extensive greenhouse farming of tomatoes and manufacture of trailers for trucks.

Närpes is a bilingual municipality with Finnish and Swedish as its official languages. The population consists of 5% Finnish speakers, 73% Swedish speakers, and 23% speakers of other languages, which is well above the national average. Närpes has been a bilingual municipality since 2016. Before that, Närpes was the last unilingual Swedish-speaking municipality in mainland Finland. Most residents speak a variant of Ostrobothnian Swedish which is known to be difficult to understand for other Swedish-speakers.

The most significant main roads in Närpes are Highway 8 between Turku and Vaasa, and Highway 67 between Kaskinen and Seinäjoki.

== History ==
Närpes has a history that can be dated back to 1331, when Klas Bengtsson in "Nærpes" pawned goods to bishop Bengt in Turku.

In 1348 king Magnus IV of Sweden declared "all who live in Nerpis socken, Mustasaari socken and Pedersöre socken" the right to buy and sell "all eatables". Thus creating the first official marketplaces in Ostrobothnia.

== Demographics ==
=== Population ===
The town of Närpes has 9,538 inhabitants, making it the 101st most populous municipality in Finland. The subdivision has a population of 16,899.

Population size of Närpes 1990–2020
Year	Population
1990	10,490
1995	10,234
2000	9,769
2005	9,463
2010	9,435
2015	9,387
2020	9,558

=== Languages ===
Population by
mother tongue (2024)
1. Swedish (73.3%)
2. Vietnamese (10.2%)
3. Finnish (4.90%)
4. Bosnian (3.60%)
5. Ukrainian (1.80%)
6. Thai (1.20%)
7. Serbo-Croatian (0.80%)
8. Other (4.20%)

The town of Närpes is officially bilingual, with both Finnish and Swedish as official languages. As of 2024, the majority of the population, 6,927 persons (72.6%) spoke Swedish as their first language. The number of Finnish speakers was 462 persons (4.8%) of the population. Foreign languages were spoken by 22.5% of the population.

The most common foreign languages are Vietnamese (10.2%), Bosnian (3.6%) and Ukrainian (1.8%).

Närpes has the largest relative share of Vietnamese in Finland of any municipality.

=== Immigration ===
Population by country of birth (2024)
Nationality	Population	%
Finland	7,433	77.8
Vietnam	866	9.1
Sweden	256	2.7
Bosnia and Herzegovina	194	2.0
Yugoslavia	126	1.3
Ukraine	116	1.2
Thailand	114	1.2
Soviet Union	70	0.7
Other	379	4.0

As of 2024, there were 2,197 persons with a foreign background living in Närpes, or 23% of the population. (Note: Statistics Finland classifies a person as having a "foreign background" if both parents or the only known parent were born abroad.) The number of residents who were born abroad was 2,121, or 22% of the population. The number of persons with foreign citizenship living in Närpes was 1,677. Most foreign-born citizens came from Vietnam, Sweden, Bosnia and Herzegovina and the former Yugoslavia.

== International relations ==
=== Twin towns — Sister cities ===
Närpes is twinned with:

- Akranes, Iceland
- Bamble, Norway
- Tønder, Denmark
- Västervik Municipality, Sweden

== Climate ==
Närpes has a subarctic climate (Köppen: Dfc).

Climate data for Narpes
Month	Jan	Feb	Mar	Apr	May	Jun	Jul	Aug	Sep	Oct	Nov	Dec	Year
Mean daily maximum °C (°F)	−2.1 (28.2)	−2.0 (28.4)	1.2 (34.2)	6.6 (43.9)	12.1 (53.8)	16.7 (62.1)	20.0 (68.0)	18.9 (66.0)	14.2 (57.6)	8.0 (46.4)	3.2 (37.8)	0.0 (32.0)	8.1 (46.5)
Daily mean °C (°F)	−4.0 (24.8)	−4.2 (24.4)	−1.7 (28.9)	3.4 (38.1)	8.8 (47.8)	13.6 (56.5)	16.9 (62.4)	15.8 (60.4)	11.3 (52.3)	5.9 (42.6)	1.7 (35.1)	−1.7 (28.9)	5.5 (41.9)
Mean daily minimum °C (°F)	−6.2 (20.8)	−6.9 (19.6)	−4.9 (23.2)	0.1 (32.2)	4.9 (40.8)	9.7 (49.5)	13.3 (55.9)	12.4 (54.3)	8.5 (47.3)	3.7 (38.7)	0.0 (32.0)	−3.7 (25.3)	2.6 (36.6)
Average precipitation mm (inches)	44.2 (1.74)	36.7 (1.44)	31.5 (1.24)	32.6 (1.28)	42.7 (1.68)	55.5 (2.19)	85.7 (3.37)	99.4 (3.91)	66.2 (2.61)	65.6 (2.58)	57.3 (2.26)	51.7 (2.04)	669.1 (26.34)
Source: Weather.Directory

== See also ==
- Bothnian Highway
- Kaskinen
