= Grönvik =

Village in Korsholm, Finland

Coordinates: 63°11′33″N 21°33′44″E

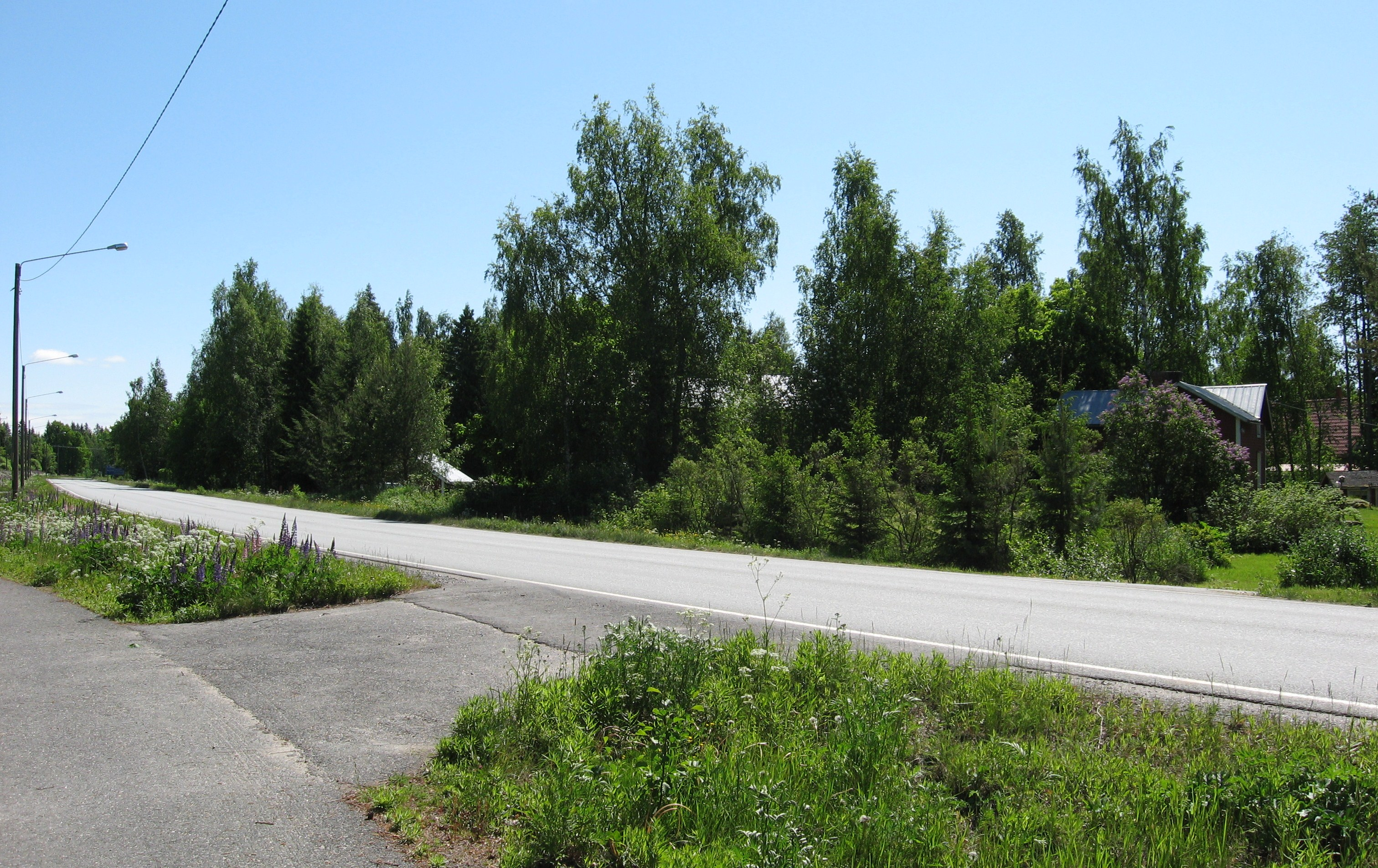
View through Grönvik.

Grönvik, previously Sumpviken, is a village and part of the village of Iskmo in the municipality of Korsholm, western Finland. The village lies on a stretch of coast, approximately 3 km long, stretching a few hundred metres up country, and around 500 metres along the Jungsundvägen road, with about a hundred metres of area around the road being inhabited. Road 724, Alskatvägen, passes through the village. The third named road found in Grönvik is Långkärrvägen. The companies Kent Häggdahl, TMI Antti Vaaranmaa, Hästbacka Invest, Easywash S-E Herrgård and Alandia Easy Wash are based in Grönvik.

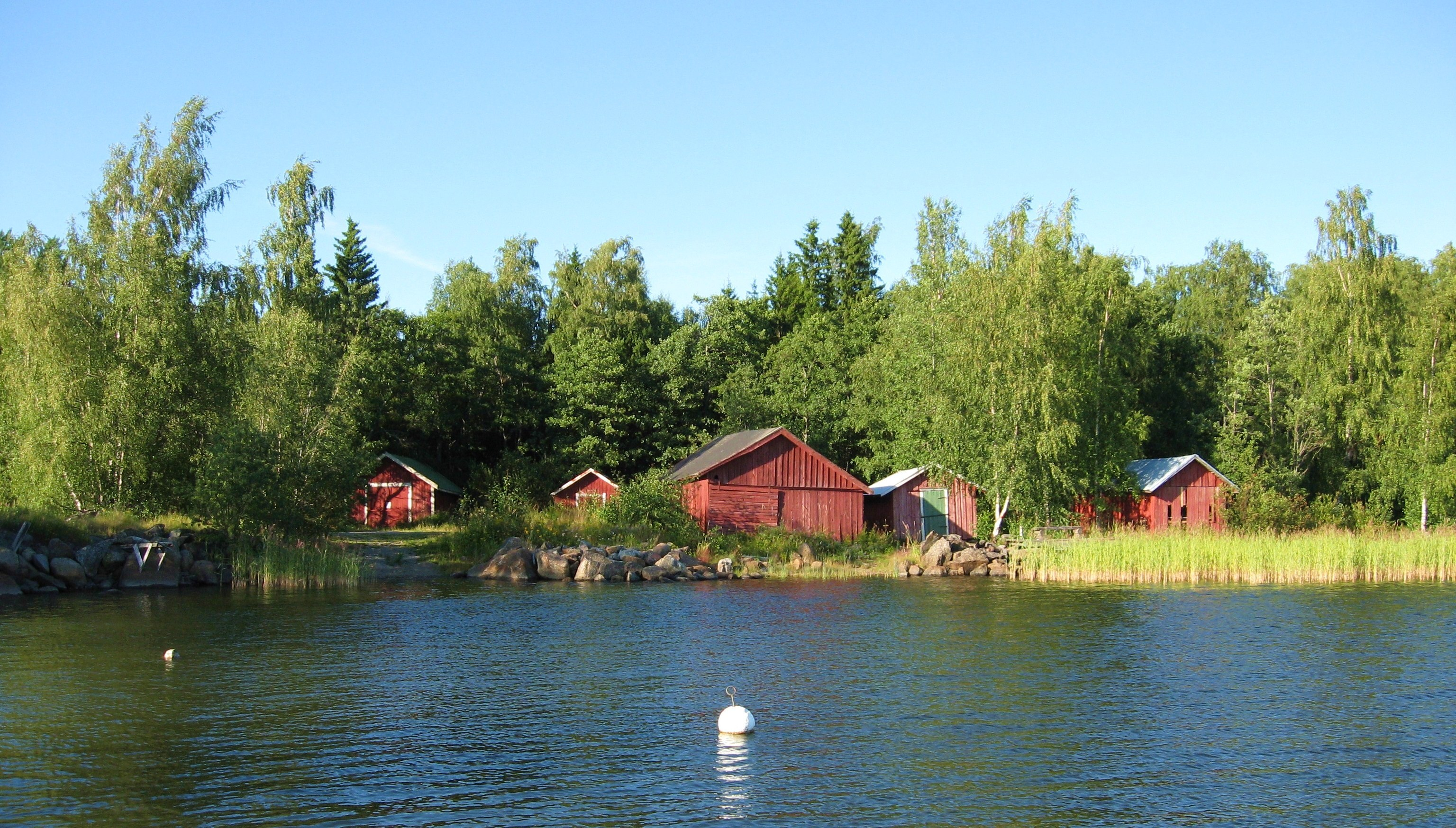
Boathouses near the public beach.

== History ==
It has been suggested that the hill of Haltija in Grönvik was in old Finnish belief the place of a local tutelary deity, Haltija, who answered for the unthreatened living of the inhabitants in the area. The area has been substantial for the communications from Finland to Sweden, shown for instance by the fact that, as early as in the 17th century, mail delivery from Finland to Sweden went through the lands of Grönvik. At the end of the 18th century shipbuilding took place in the village.

From 1812 to 1907 the Glassworks of Grönvik, which became the largest glassworks in the Nordic countries, existed here. Tradesman Johan Grönberg from Vaasa founded the company and it was run for three generations by the Grönberg family. The main building of the glassworks was the mansion of Grönvik, assumed to have been built around 1780. The shipbuilding also expanded into a large-scale activity, and during a period of time one third of the merchant ships in Vaasa were made in Grönvik. At the bank of the factory an ancient monument law protected stone bridge deck of ship yard structures remains. The glassworks had employees from Belgium, France, Germany and Sweden and the village harboured many European cultures during its functioning.

In September 1980 Alskatvägen was opened, stretching from Vaasa to Replot-Björköby, through Grönvik. This reduced the driving distance and time from the village to Vaasa, contributing to a lively immigration to the village from 1983 to 1993. At the glassworks bank there have been a harbour place, and a bit north along Alskatvägen, another one. A public beach, maintained by the municipality, and some old boat houses, are now found on the former place of the latter. As Grönvik lies on land affected by post-glacial rebound, the Grönvik flad, which borders the shore of the village, will in the future will become a gloe lake. This means that the bank areas of Grönvik can no longer be reached by larger boats.

The origin of the name Grönvik is not known, but it may have been given as the name of the bay off and the coast area of present-day Grönvik by the Grönberg family as a constructed name.
