= Grönvik glasbruk =

Finnish glassmaking company

Grönvik glasbruk (en. The Glassworks of Grönvik) or simply Grönvik was a glassworks in the present-day Grönvik village in Korsholm, Western Finland. It was founded by merchant Johan Grönberg and existed from 1812 to 1907. Several glass manufactures were produced at Grönvik. At first bottles and drinking-glass were made here, but beginning in the 1890s solely window glass. Also pharmaceutical glass was manufactured. The glassworks produced as the first factory in Finland pressed glass, which came about from the 1840s. The domestic market for glass was during the time of the glassworks smallish and glassblowing products were exported to e.g. Lübeck, Saint Petersburg, Stockholm and Denmark, as well as to other parts of Europe. Grönvik was able to successfully assert its position, despite the competition from other glassworks in Finland. Eventually, it became the most distinguished in the country. The glassworks also become the largest in the Nordic countries.

The glassworks of Grönvik had a quite large significance to the surrounding area. At Grönvik provisions, wood and ashes were bought. The own forests of the glassworks were preferably not used as firewood to let the trees grow to ship timber. Grönvik furthermore gave the opportunity of earnings. It counteracted emigration from the villages nearby as a great number of people in Jungsund and Iskmo were employed there. The glass-blowers, whose professional skills were considerable, often came from far away. There were employees from Belgium, France, Germany and Sweden. The industrial community flourished in the time of prosperity of the glassworks, there was exuberant activity and several languages of Europe were being used.

The glass making was usually going on for eight months a year, after which it had to be at a standstill to allow for the cleaning of the furnaces. The employees were paid during this four-month period too. Buildings for accommodation had also been constructed for the workers, who during the company's most prosperous times were around 100 in number. In summer, glass chests were transported to Vaasa on the two towboats of the glassworks.

In connection with the factory there were for some time a minor earthenware foundry and a shipbuilding yard, established by Johan Grönberg, where several ships were constructed, as well as 1831–1876 the rag paper-mill of Jungsund, also founded by Grönberg. Furthermore, there has been a tilery and a forge related to the glassworks. The mansion of Grönvik was the main building of the glassworks. After a fire in 1917, the only remaining buildings from the glassworks today, is the mansion and ruins of a stable from 1832, which was destroyed in the fire. On its property, Grönvik glasbruk had the first gardens, and also the most extended, in Iskmo-Jungsund, with a highly advanced horticulture. There is, to the west of the mansion, a large garden that was laid out already in the early times of the glassworks.

== History ==
=== 1812–1843 ===
Probably as a result of the Finnish War, the glassworks of Berga in Pörtom most likely had been closed down temporarily, causing a shortage of a variety of glass products in the Vaasa region. Furthermore, the long distances to functioning glass factories made the transport of glass products to the area troublesome and expensive, raising the price on glass. To remedy the shortage, tradesman Johan Grönberg (1777–1843) from Vaasa tendered a request on 23 March 1812 to found a glassworks in Grönvik, on the land he had bought two weeks earlier, to the Imperial Cabinet of Ministers in Turku. On 30 July the request was approved and Grönberg obtained licences for production. It seems however, as he had incepted the construction of buildings around late winter and early springtime. Grönberg discovered previously overlooked natural wealth in Grönvik. The glassworks were to be built on the seaboard, on the land he had purchased. The location was excellent for the glassworks. It was possible to have a good harbour in the vicinity and the harbour established was by means of the time gratifying and served the purpose of being in receipt of raw material and affreighting glass. On the shores in Grönvik there were plenty of sand and silicon, which were needed for the production of glass. The archipelago with the large forests was important, as it would provide fuel for the glassworks. The southward way to Vaasa was by land about 25 kilometres and 35 kilometres by water. If the glassworks of Berga, as assumed, had been stopped over, this would have made Grönvik the only glassworks in the more northern parts of Finland. There were in that case much larger prospects for the sale of the glass made at Grönvik.

The factory started its production in autumn 1813. The skillful glassmakers that were required Grönberg brought first from Sweden, and at ulterior signings also from Belgium and France. There were five or six glassblowers in the first year, more were employed later. For the most part, they had come from abroad. The management was entrusted to bookkeepers and inspectors by Grönberg, who lived in Vaasa. Probably as the main purpose to have more forest by which to secure the supply of wood as fuel for the glassworks, Grönberg bought many homesteads. Eventually he owned 41% respectively one third of the villages of Iskmo and South Jungsund. He had extensive drainage works carried out, partly to assemble water power for the factory.

=== 1843–1878 ===
Magistrate Johan August Grönberg (1811–1871), the second youngest son of Johan Grönberg, became proprietor of the factory after his father when he died. He was, though, not mostly suited for the task and as he ran the glassworks it suffered retrogression. After his death in 1871, his widow Augusta Maria Rochier continued the running of the glassworks, assisted by her brother Gustav Rochier. Bottles and window glass became the main focus of the production. It was however not until the son of Johan August Grönberg and Augusta Maria Rochier, Axel Grönberg, took over as head of the glassworks that the extent of the production changed from what they had been since the time of Johan Grönberg.

=== 1878–1907 ===
Sea captain Axel Grönberg was proprietor of Grönvik from 1878 and carried out a sweeping reconstruction of the factory; the industry was renewed and developed. The number of employees rose to 58, from the earlier 16. Under the leadership of Axel Grönberg, the glassworks went through a grand upswing and experienced its heyday.

During a journey to Belgium he learned about newer means for glassmaking. When he returned he developed the facilities of the glassworks in 1883 with among other things two additional furnaces to the existing six and introduced gas to replace wood for heating in the furnaces. The houses also got gaslight via a conduit now. At the same time, the production of green window glass, small glass and bottles ended and the light window glass (the cylinder glass) began to be made. The factory was subjected to a fire in autumn 1885 that entirely destroyed one wing of the factory building. In 1887 the complete glassworks was ravaged by a conflagration, but very soon after, it was rebuilt, in unchanged state from before the conflagration. On 22 March 1890 it was once again subjected to a fire, and afterwards, in addition to being rebuilt, also expanded, after this having 18 furnaces. These were heated by five generators. At that time, there were about 50 employees.

After the glassworks once more burned down on 8 April 1891, Axel Grönberg went on a new study tour to Belgium and acquainted fully with the modern glassmaking industry of the time. When he returned he had bought the patent of Emil Gobbens on window glass making and brought two French engineers, Désiré de Brouen and Boun Enfantin, who became in charge of the rebuilding of the glassworks. The factory now got a continuous melting basin. Since this new furnace was meant to be more fuel-sawing, the work needed to be carried out unceasingly both day and night. In twenty-four hours, there were three shifts. However, the furnace could be used not more than two months a year, because the amount of glass produced with it was so large. At the beginning of the 20th century, it was one of the biggest window glass producers in the Nordic countries. The number of employed was about 100 persons at that time. The successes of the glassworks depended highly on skilful glass blowers available and the sale of window glass.

The palmy days of the glassworks lasted from 1891 to 1902 and most of the glass produced was brought to other parts of the Russian Empire. The business was going very well. However, when similar glassworks were being founded in Russia and the Russian import duties on glass almost at the same time were heavily raised, foreign glass production could not compete on that market. Contemporaneously the Finnish window glass association was formed, and the amount of window glass that Grönvik was given the right to produce was only 24% of Finland's yearly need. Adversities were hitting the factory, since the window glass produced at glassworks in Finland had exceeded the quantity that was sold. Subsequently, the debts became too large. At the beginning of the 20th century, the demand for glass also went down. The restriction in manufacturing caused the owner to become insolvent. The glassworks first had to be overtaken by a bank, and later it was bought, below cost prize, by bank manager John Sjödahl in Vaasa. The Finnish window glass association purchased the glassworks in 1903. The association carried on the production, with Axel Grönberg as technical supervisor, until 1907, when the glassworks reached bankruptcy. It was then completely abolished and, being unprofitable, discontinued in 1907. By 27 April the workers had had notice to quit.

In autumn 1915 the main properties of the glassworks were sold to three farmers from Jungsund.

== Schools at Grönvik ==
In autumn 1815, a school was established in Grönvik by Johan Grönberg. The teacher was paid by Grönberg and with the interest of a donation to the congregation of Korsholm, since the anonymous donor had stipulated that the interest would go to teacher in a school for the villages of Iskmo and Jungsund, and no such school had been started until the time when Grönberg founded the school at Grönvik. Reading and knowledge of Christianity was taught at the school. Children at the glassworks were given the education without any particular fee, while other children of the local peasantry were obliged to specifically pay for the teaching. After a school had been established in Jungsund and started to receive the interest of the donation, Grönberg tried in 1840 to have the pay of the Grönvik teachers, who would also function as preachers for the people at the glassworks, obtained from the income of a parish granary, a request which the senate assented to on 16 October 1841. The granary was however not as successful for Grönberg as he had anticipated and it is unknown whether or not any teacher and preacher was employed at all. At least, after his death, his inheritors did not employ any such person. In 1848 however, the parish dean lodged an appeal to the governor and the senate to have them engage a teacher and preacher at the works, but the request was turned down.

Nothing is known about school education in Grönvik in the 1850s, −60s and −70s. A daughter of a worker at the glassworks held school for children at the factory for some years around 1880, as did an elementary school teacher during one summer in the 1880s, asked to by captain Grönberg. Early in 1887, minor meetings were held to initiate an elementary school for Iskmo and Jungsund, however such a school was founded singly by the glassworks at Grönvik. It opened in 1888 and was, following the discontinuation of the glassworks, closed in 1908. The school house was the smallest in the parish.
