= Valsörarna =

Coordinates: 63°25′N 21°05′E

Valsörarna (in Swedish) or Valassaaret (in Finnish) is a small archipelago in Korsholm, Finland, located in the Kvarken region of the Gulf of Bothnia. The islands are the last you see when going by boat or ferry from Vaasa, Finland to Umeå, Sweden. The archipelago is detached from Korsholm's main Replot-Björkö archipelago. They are uninhabited and there is no road access. However, they are an important bird sanctuary, frequented by birdwatchers and ornithologists. They are included in the UNESCO World Heritage List along with the High Coast of Sweden and the archipelago of Kvarken, for exhibiting the effects of land rise due to post-glacial rebound.

== History ==
=== The name ===
The name Valsörarna is of Swedish origin. It is believed that the name was derived from the stone-clad shores and the moraine which resembles a whale. The Finnish name Valassaaret is believed to have been derived from the Swedish word.

=== An old route between Finland and Sweden ===
The Valsörarna is the shortest route to the Swedish island Holmsö only 23 kilometres (14 miles) away. During winter, the waters of Kvarken are completely iced and it was possible to walk over to the neighbouring country that way. Today, this is not possible because of active ferry traffic and lanes that are kept open by icebreakers for commercial shipping.

This fact was used during the Finnish War by Russian general Barclay de Tolly who used this route in November 1809 when marching over to Umeå. The march to Sweden with about 3700 soldiers was successful but failed on the return trip. The severe cold of the spring and the lack of food took their toll on the men and it is estimated that 400 died from the cold alone. The remains of these soldiers were still present around Valsörarna in the 1900s. In memory of the fallen men, there is now a memorial mound of stones raised on Äbbskär. A saying tells the tale that the inhabitants of Valsörarna grew tired upon always finding skeletons everywhere around the islands and collected them all in one place, which today is the mound of stones.

=== The lighthouse is built ===
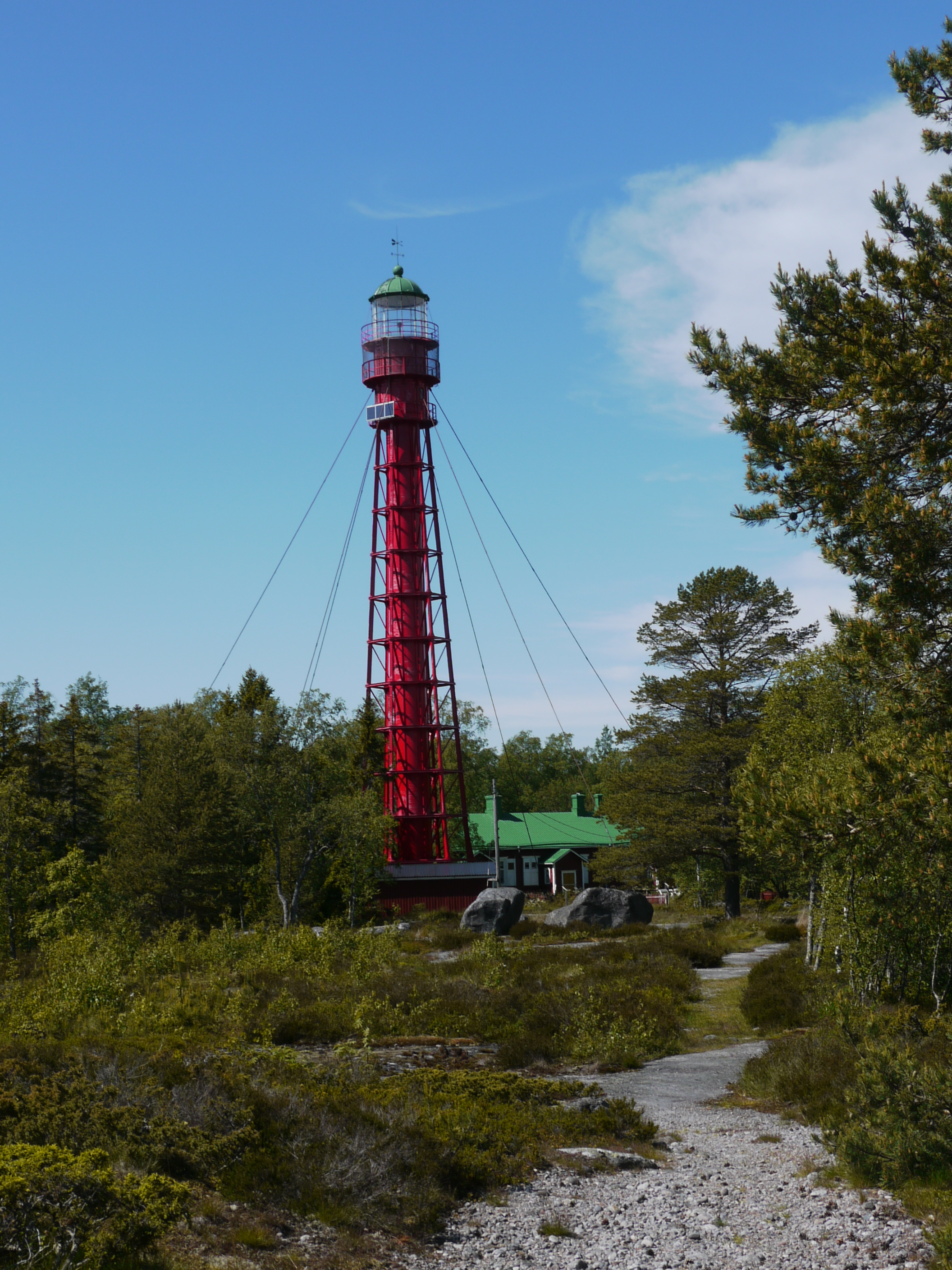
Valsörarna lighthouse

There was a sailmark made out of a tree on the island in the 1850s, but that became inefficient for use in the dangerous waters of Kvarken as traffic increased. The long thought-of lighthouse became reality after five boats ran aground on the same night in 1879. The lighthouse was designed by Henry Lepaute who worked for Gustave Eiffels engineering company and built by the same company in France that manufactured the components for the Eiffel Tower.

The lighthouse was initially intended to be placed on Äbbskär. However, after digging and ground analysis, it was concluded that Äbbskär had no suitable ground for the lighthouse and it was decided that it should be moved to Storskär. The hole that was dug on Äbbskär is still there today with a coast guard station as a neighbour.

For the move over to Storskär, a bridge of stone was built between it and Äbbskär. The road also built in connection to the bridge got the name Kärleksstigen (" the love path"). The lighthouse was securely fastened on the mountain on Storskär in 1886, and still stands there today, fire-red, 36 metres (118 feet) high and with 175 steps inside.

The lighthouse amazed and even scared people with its fire-red color fuelling rumors. The best known rumor was that if you touched the lighthouse, you got seriously burned from it. This rumor was so widespread that it lived long until the 1950s.

In 1963 the lighthouse was first automated and later, in the 1980s, electrified. The lens system was removed in conjunction with the electrification and is now on display in Vaasa Seamuseum.

The lighthouse was closed from the public in 2013. It was found that it was impossible to repair or reconstruct the lighthouse to fulfill modern safety and accessibility standards without substantially modifying the architecture.

== Climate ==
Valsörarna has a warm-summer humid continental climate (Dfb) with strong moderation from the Kvarken.

Climate data for Valsörarna/Valassaaret (1991–2020 temperatures, 1981-2010 precipitation and sunshine, extremes 1959- present)
Month	Jan	Feb	Mar	Apr	May	Jun	Jul	Aug	Sep	Oct	Nov	Dec	Year
Record high °C (°F)	8.1 (46.6)	7.0 (44.6)	11.3 (52.3)	16.6 (61.9)	22.6 (72.7)	26.6 (79.9)	31.4 (88.5)	31.3 (88.3)	24.5 (76.1)	15.5 (59.9)	11.9 (53.4)	7.0 (44.6)	31.4 (88.5)
Mean daily maximum °C (°F)	−1.3 (29.7)	−2.8 (27.0)	0.1 (32.2)	4.2 (39.6)	9.7 (49.5)	14.7 (58.5)	18.7 (65.7)	18.2 (64.8)	13.6 (56.5)	7.6 (45.7)	3.5 (38.3)	1.1 (34.0)	7.3 (45.1)
Daily mean °C (°F)	−3.1 (26.4)	−4.5 (23.9)	−2.1 (28.2)	2.0 (35.6)	6.7 (44.1)	11.9 (53.4)	16.1 (61.0)	15.9 (60.6)	11.5 (52.7)	6.2 (43.2)	2.3 (36.1)	−0.5 (31.1)	5.2 (41.4)
Mean daily minimum °C (°F)	−5.4 (22.3)	−7.4 (18.7)	−4.7 (23.5)	−0.4 (31.3)	4.1 (39.4)	9.1 (48.4)	13.4 (56.1)	13.5 (56.3)	9.4 (48.9)	4.4 (39.9)	0.4 (32.7)	−2.3 (27.9)	2.8 (37.0)
Record low °C (°F)	−27.8 (−18.0)	−28.7 (−19.7)	−28.2 (−18.8)	−18.7 (−1.7)	−5.0 (23.0)	1.5 (34.7)	6.4 (43.5)	4.8 (40.6)	0.5 (32.9)	−8.0 (17.6)	−15.6 (3.9)	−25.9 (−14.6)	−28.7 (−19.7)
Average precipitation mm (inches)	39 (1.5)	30 (1.2)	31 (1.2)	22 (0.9)	32 (1.3)	39 (1.5)	51 (2.0)	54 (2.1)	49 (1.9)	54 (2.1)	53 (2.1)	43 (1.7)	497 (19.6)
Average precipitation days (≥ 1.0 mm)	10	7	8	5	6	6	7	8	8	10	10	10	95
Average relative humidity (%)	87	87	87	82	79	79	81	81	82	83	85	87	83
Mean monthly sunshine hours	32	76	123	203	295	306	295	235	152	81	36	20	1,854
Source 1: FMI climatological normals for Finland 1991-2020
Source 2: Record highs and lows 1959- present
