= Björköby =

- Former municipality
- Björköby kommun Björköbyn kunta
- Coat of arms

- Location of Björköby in Finland
- Interactive map of Björköby
- Coordinates: 63°21′N 21°19′E
- Country: Finland
- Province: Vaasa Province
- Region: Ostrobothnia
- Established: 1932
- Merged into Korsholm: 1973
- Seat: Björköby

Area
  - Land: 63.7 km^{2} (24.6 sq mi)

Population (1972-12-31)
  - Total: 459

Björköby is a village and a former municipality now part of Korsholm, Finland. It is the chief settlement on the island of Björkö. The harbour of the village is called Svedjehamn.

Björköby was an independent municipality until 1973.

== History ==
Björköby was first mentioned in 1543 as Börckön. It was a part of the Mussar (later Korsholm) parish until 1872, when Replot was separated from it, though Replot had already become a municipality in 1868. The local name for the settlement is simply Björkö, "birch island", but it was changed to Björköby (by meaning "village") in 1932, when it became its own municipality. This was done to distinguish it from other Björkös, since Björkö is a fairly common place name. Björköby never formed a separate parish.

Together with Replot, Kvevlax and Solf, Björköby was consolidated with Korsholm in 1973.

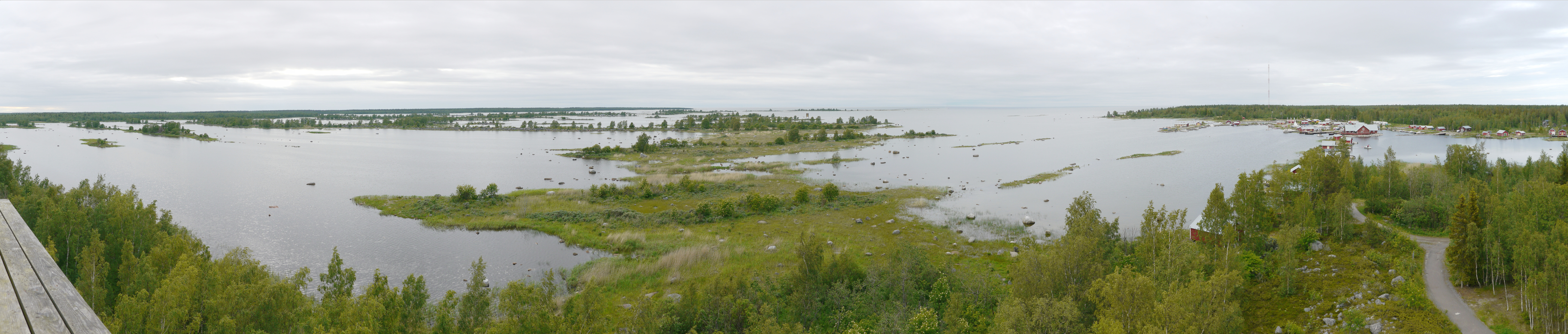
Panorama photo taken from watch tower Saltskär, near Svedjehamn, Björköby.
