= Österhankmo =

Village in Finland

Coordinates: 63°13′51″N 21°55′37″E

Österhankmo is a village in the municipality of Korsholm, Finland.

Corresponding to Österhankmo (English: Eastern Hankmo) is the nearby village Västerhankmo (English: Western Hankmo). The closest larger village is Kvevlax, approximately 11 km away. Children from Österhankmo go to school in Kvevlax, and that is also where residents do their shopping.
