= Vaasa Province =

Province of Finland (1775–1997)

Coordinates: 63.1000°N 21.6167°E

Province of Vaasa Vaasan lääni Vasa län
- County of Sweden 1775–1809; Province of Grand Duchy of Finland 1809–1917; Province of independent Finland 1917–1997
- 1775–1997
- Coat of arms
- Capital: Vaasa
- Area
  - 1.1.1993: 27,319 km^{2} (10,548 sq mi)
- Population
  - 1.1.1993: 448,384
- History
  - Established: 1775
  - Disestablished: 1997
Preceded by	Succeeded by
County of Ostrobothnia	Province of Central Finland; Western Finland

Vaasa Province (Finnish: Vaasan lääni [ˈʋɑːsɑn ˈlæːni]; Swedish: Vasa län, Finland Swedish: [ˈvɑːsɑ ˈleːn], Sweden Swedish: [ˈvɑ̂ːsa ˈlɛːn]; Russian: Вазаская губерния) was a province of Finland, established in 1775 when Finland was an integrated part of Sweden from the southern part of Ostrobothnia County and disbanded in 1997. The province was named after the city of Vaasa.

On the death of Tsar Nicholas I in 1855, a small group of citizens in the city of Vaasa tendered a petition to change the name of the city after him. The name of the city came from the Royal House of Vasa and despite that only 15 citizens were backing the proposal the name of the city was changed to Nikolaistad (Russian: Николайстада, Finnish: Nikolainkaupunki). However, the name of the province was not changed.

In 1960 the eastern part was separated as the Province of Central Finland. In 1997 it was reunited with Central Finland, together they merged with the northern part of the Province of Häme and the Province of Turku and Pori to establish the new Province of Western Finland.

The former province corresponds to the current regions of Ostrobothnia, Central Ostrobothnia and Southern Ostrobothnia.

== Maps ==
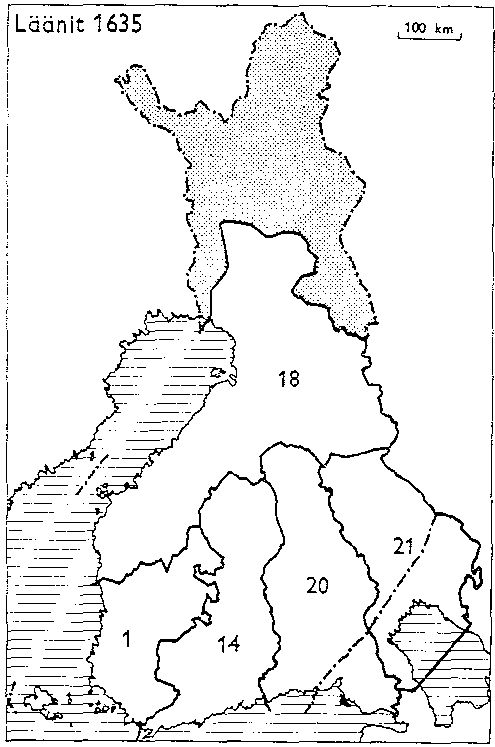
Provinces of Finland 1634: 1: Turku and Pori, 14: Nyland and Tavastehus, 18: Ostrobothnia, 20: Viborg and Nyslott, 21: Kexholm

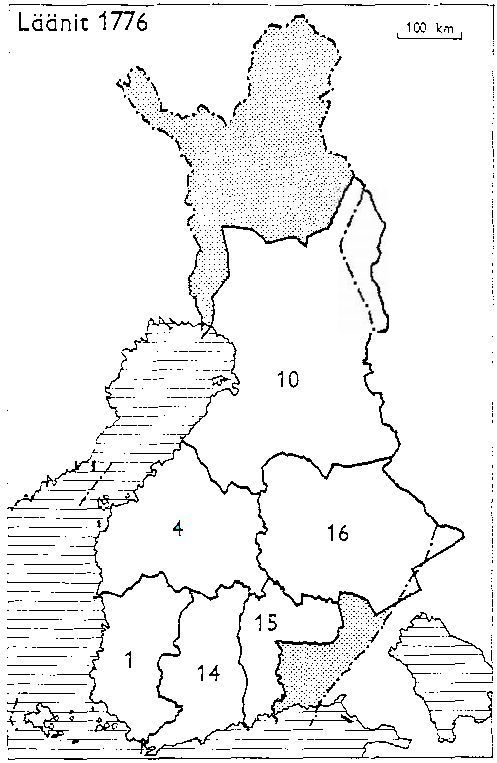
Provinces of Finland 1776: 1: Turku and Pori, 4: Vaasa, 10: Oulu, 14: Nyland and Tavastehus, 15: Kymmenegård, 16: Savolax and Karelia

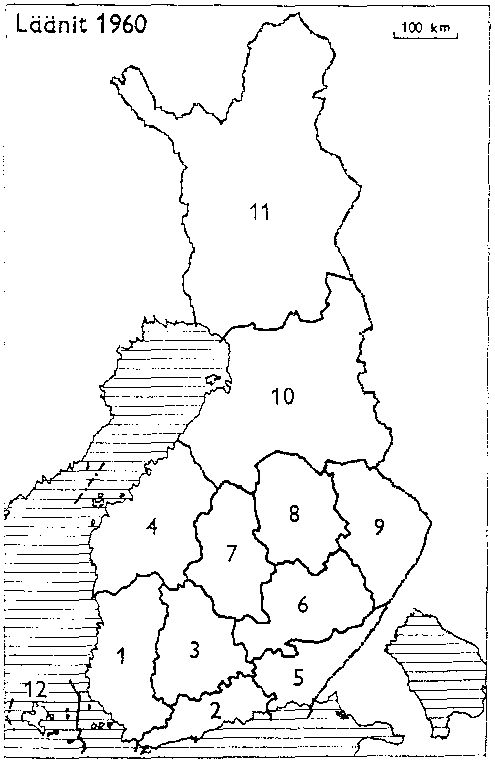
Provinces of Finland 1960: 1: Turku and Pori, 2: Uusimaa, 3: Häme, 4: Vaasa, 5: Kymi, 6: Mikkeli, 7: Central Finland, 8: Kuopio, 9: Northern Karelia, 10: Oulu, 11: Lapland, 12: Åland

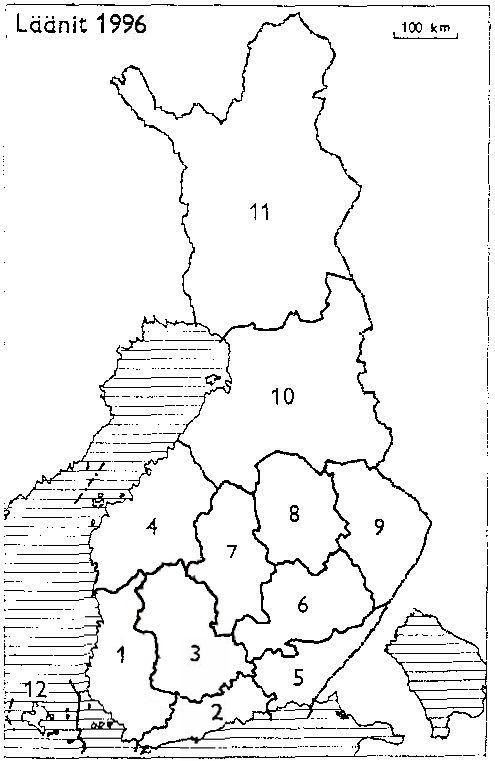
Provinces of Finland 1996: 1: Turku and Pori, 2: Uusimaa, 3: Häme, 4: Vaasa, 5: Kymi, 6: Mikkeli, 7: Central Finland, 8: Kuopio, 9: Northern Karelia, 10: Oulu, 11: Lapland, 12: Åland

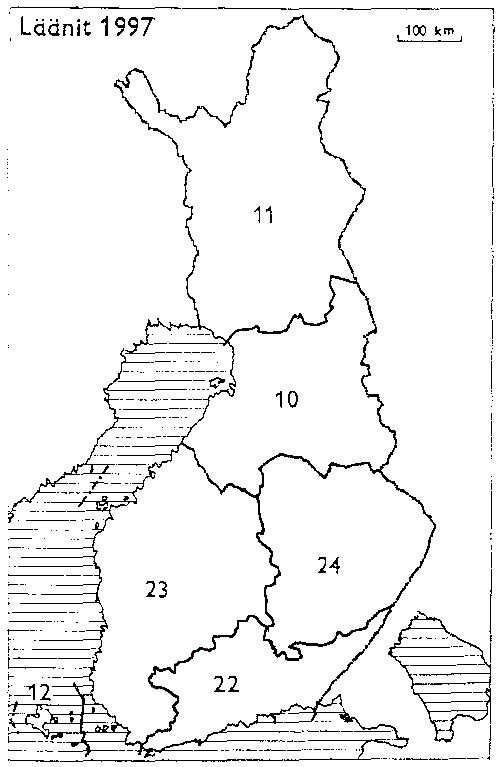
Provinces of Finland 1997: 10: Oulu, 11: Lapland, 12: Åland, 22: Southern Finland, 23: Western Finland, 24: Eastern Finland

== Municipalities in 1997 (cities in bold) ==
- Alahärmä
- **Alajärvi**
- **Alavus**
- Evijärvi
- Halsua
- Himanka
- Ilmajoki
- Isojoki
- Isokyrö
- **Jakobstad**
- Jalasjärvi
- Jurva
- **Kannus**
- Karijoki
- **Kaskinen**
- Kauhajoki
- **Kauhava**
- Kaustinen
- **Kokkola**
- Korsnäs
- Kortesjärvi
- **Kristinestad**
- Kronoby
- Kuortane
- **Kurikka**
- Kälviä
- Laihia
- Lappajärvi
- **Lapua**
- Larsmo
- Lehtimäki
- Lestijärvi
- Lohtaja
- Malax
- Maxmo
- Korsholm
- Nurmo
- **Nykarleby**
- **Närpes**
- Oravais
- Pedersöre
- Perho
- Peräseinäjoki
- **Seinäjoki**
- Soini
- Teuva
- Toholampi
- Töysä
- Ullava
- **Vaasa**
- Veteli
- Vimpeli
- Vähäkyrö
- Vörå
- Ylihärmä
- Ylistaro
- **Ähtäri**

== Former municipalities (disestablished before 1997) ==
- Bergö
- Björköby
- Esse
- Jeppo
- Karleby kommun
- Kvevlax
- Lappfjärd
- Munsala
- Nedervetil
- Nykarleby landskommun
- Petalax
- Purmo
- Pörtom
- Replot
- Seinäjoen mlk
- Sideby
- Solf
- Terjärv
- Tjöck
- Öja
- Övermark

== Governors ==
- Bror Cederström 1775–1785
- Adolf Tandefeldt 1785–1794
- Carl Fridrik Krabbe 1794–1805
- Magnus Wanberg 1805–1808
- Nils Fredric von Schoultz 1808
- Carl Constantin de Carnall 1808–1822
- Herman Henrik Wärnhjelm 1822–1830
- Gustaf Magnus Armfelt 1830–1832
- Carl Gustaf von Mannerheim 1832–1833 (acting) and 1833–1834
- Carl Olof Cronstedt 1834–1837 (acting) and 1837–1845
- John Ferdinand Bergenheim 1845–1847
- Berndt Federley 1847–1854
- Alexander von Rechenberg 1854–1858
- Otto Leonard von Blom 1858–1861
- Carl Gustaf Fabian Wrede 1862–1863 (vt.) and 1863–1884
- Viktor Napoleon Procopé 1884–1888
- August Alexander Järnefelt 1888–1894
- Waldemar Schauman 1894–1898
- Gustaf Axel von Kothen 1898–1900
- Fredrik Geronimo Björnberg 1900–1903
- Theodor Knipovitsch 1903–1906
- Kasten Fredrik Ferdinand de Pont 1906–1910
- Bernhard Otto Widnäs 1910–1913
- Nikolai Sillman 1913–1916
- Leo Aristides Sirelius 1916–1917
- Juho Torppa 1917 (acting)
- Teodor August Heikel 1917–1920
- Bruno Sarlin 1920–1930
- Erik Heinrichs 1930
- Kaarlo Martonen 1930–1938
- Jalo Lahdensuo 1938–1943
- Toivo Tarjanne 1943–1944
- K. G. R. Ahlbäck 1944–1967
- Martti Viitanen 1967–1977
- Antti Pohjonen 1977–1978
- Mauno Kangasniemi 1978–1991
- Tom Westergård 1991–1997
