= Grönvik gård =

Coordinates: 63°11′33″N 21°33′39″E

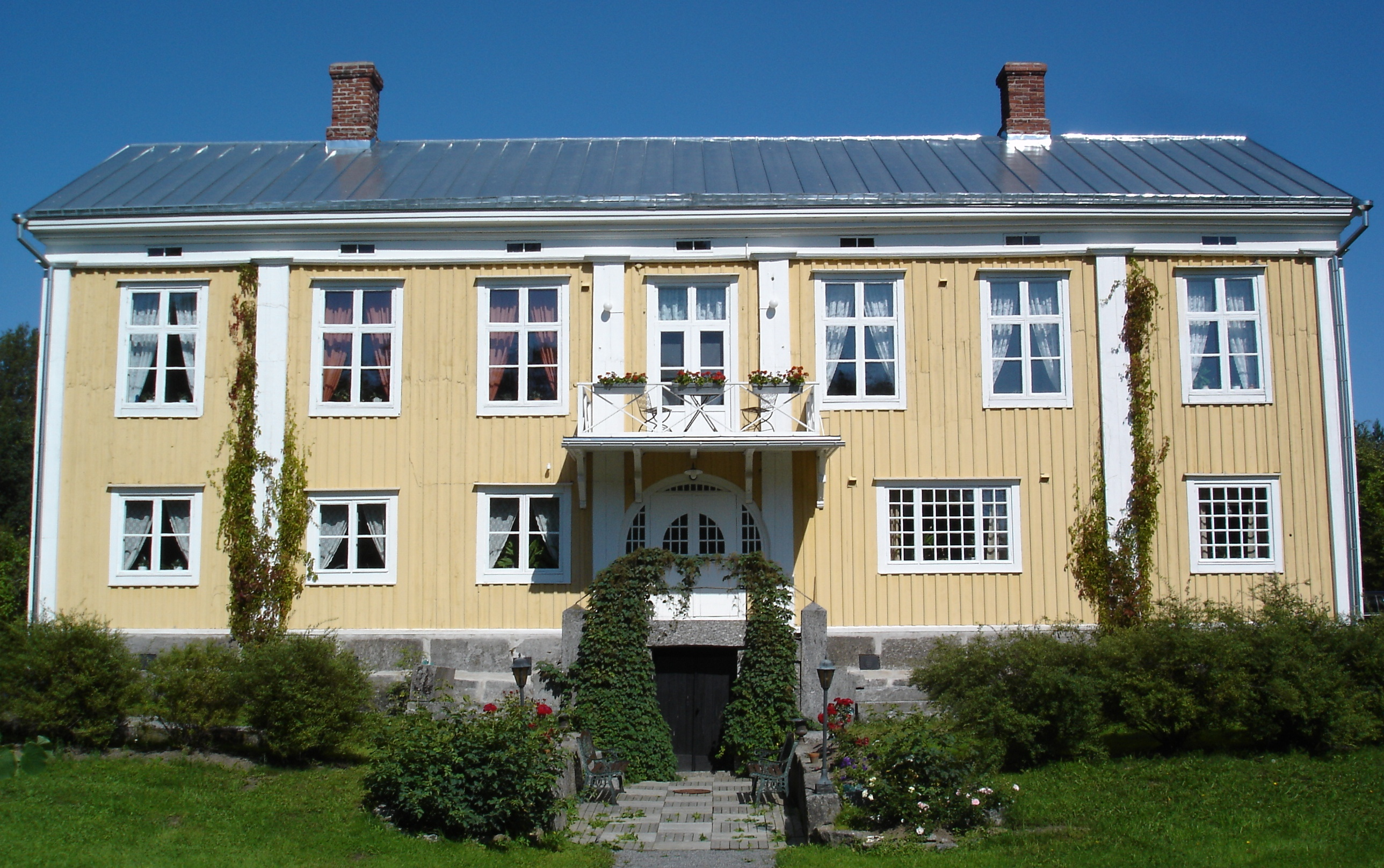
Grönvik gård

Grönvik gård (Eng. The Mansion of Grönvik) is a mansion in the village of Grönvik, Korsholm municipality in Western Finland. The house is in Swedish mansion style. Its shell is made of logs and the facade of wooden deals, on top of birch bark. It remains on the same location as where it was built. The year of construction and first owner of the mansion are not known, though it is assumed that it was built around 1780, for an associate judge of appeal in Vaasa, Johan Casimir de la Chapelle. However, it might have built by master builder Johan Johansson Kallinen (Kallis), who was registered in Iskmo 1791–1802 (although he probably stayed there still in 1804–1805). Both of them owned land of the hide on which the mansion lies. The original appearance of the house is unknown too, however, it is thought that the house was originally in one floor, with the current second story possibly added in 1812.

Johan Grönberg, a merchant from Vaasa, obtained the building on 4 June 1816, with a surrounding area of a hide, from a farmer. The second floor might have been added by him. Grönberg founded the glassworks of Grönvik (1812–1907) at the same homestead as the mansion lied. The house was owned for three generations by the Grönberg family, which ran the glassworks. The mansion, on the estate of the works, was the main building of the glassworks and partly used as residence. The ground floor had a vestibule, a hall, a kitchen and seven chambers. There was a spiral staircase from the vestibule to the upper floor, where there was a hall, seven chambers and a drawing-room. During Johan Grönberg's grandson Axel Grönberg's time as factory proprietor, the house was once more developed in height and got larger windows on the upper floor. The stone doorsteps were also constructed at that time.

After the bankruptcy of the glassworks, in 1907, the estate was acquired by Russians. In autumn 1915 the hide which had been the main area of the glassworks, including the mansion, was sold to three farmers from Jungsund. In 1917, Erik von Troil from Vaasa bought the estate, which was then in utter decay, from the farmers. The same year, a fire ravaged the properties, and several of the buildings around the manor house were destroyed. It was owned for three generations by the family von Troil, who from the 1920s used it as their summer residence. The manor was bought by the Hästbacka family in December 1997. By the time the mansion was in bad condition. The family restored the building from 1998 to 2003, giving it back its earlier splendour and largely preserving the old interior of it. Also, the window glasses of the mansion produced at the glassworks in 1901 are still in place. The owners now offer lodging and conference facilities on the manor. The house is the only remaining building of the glassworks and it has the status of a locally highly important cultural-historical site. The manor comprises a 15,800 m^{2} site on which the mansion, as well as a minor house from 1920, is situated. There is also, to the west of the mansion, a large garden that was laid out already in the early times of the glassworks. At the mansion observations have been made of what is said to be ghosts, including a White Lady, the identity of whom is unknown.
