= Edvard Helenelund =

Finnish politician (1885–1976)

Gustaf Edvard Helenelund
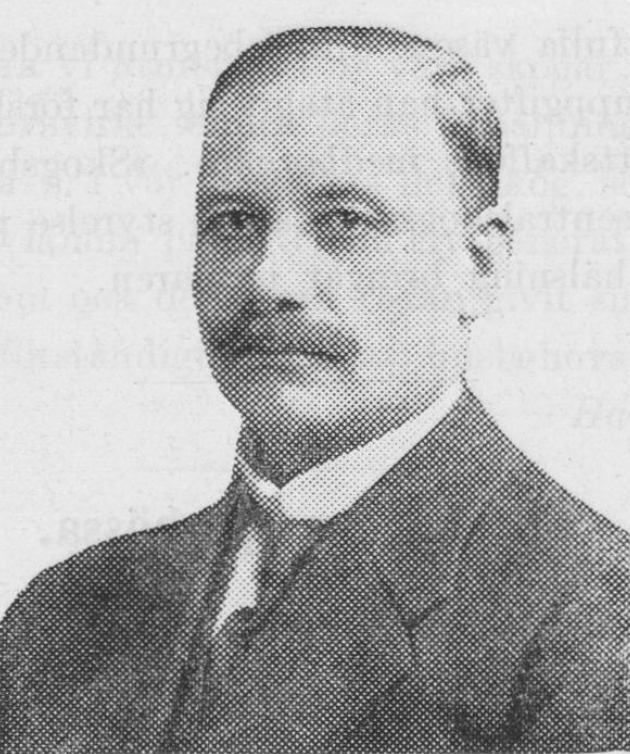

Member of the Parliament of Finland
- In office 1919–1924
- In office 1927–1929
- In office 1930–1945

Personal details
- Born: June 6, 1885 Solf, Finland
- Died: March 13, 1976 (aged 90)
- Party: Swedish People's Party of Finland
- Occupation: Farmer, politician

Gustaf Edvard Helenelund (6 June 1885, Solf - 13 March 1976) was a Swedish-speaking Finnish farmer and politician. He was a member of the Parliament of Finland from 1919 to 1924, from 1927 to 1929 and from 1930 to 1945, representing the Swedish People's Party of Finland (SFP).
