= Pali-Maija =

Finnish folk poet

- Born: 10 December 1784 Pörtom, Ostrobothnia
- Died: 11 October 1867 (aged 82) Närpes
- Occupation: Poet
- Years active: 1802 -1860

Maria Johansdotter Berg, known by her pseudonyms as Pali-Maija, Pali-Maj, or Pali-Maja (1784 Pörtom – 1867 Närpes), was a Fenno-Swedish folk poet who lived in Ostrobothnia.

From the age of 18, Pali-Maija worked as a teacher and also earned extra money by writing poems for, among other things, weddings. Pali-Maija's poems and songs were often influenced by scriptures and hymns. During her lifetime, only a few of Pali-Maija's poems were published in print.

== Early life and work ==
Pali-Maija was the daughter of farmer Johann Hanson Upgaard (formerly Hanus) and Maria Greta Upgaard in South Ostrobothnia. She first worked as a servant, but from at least 1802 and for about 50 years thereafter she supported herself by running a preschool. In 1814, she had a son outside of marriage with Mats Matson Snickers in Nornas, for which she was prosecuted. The case ruined her reputation and resulted in a fine. In 1819, she married the farmer's son Mats Mattessonberg (1847–1798), with whom she had four children. The youngest, Clara Johanna, was born when Pali-Maija was 40 years old. After her husband's death in 1847, she lived with her son-in-law in the parish almshouse.

As a writer, Pali-Maija was active from at least 1802 onwards. Among other things, she used poetry as an educational method in her teaching. She wrote hundreds of poems and accepted orders. Her poems were printed in newspapers throughout her life, but mainly spread by word of mouth through folk music.

== Publications ==
- Folkdikter (1882)
- Pali-Maj och hennes dikter (1983)
