= Replot Bridge =

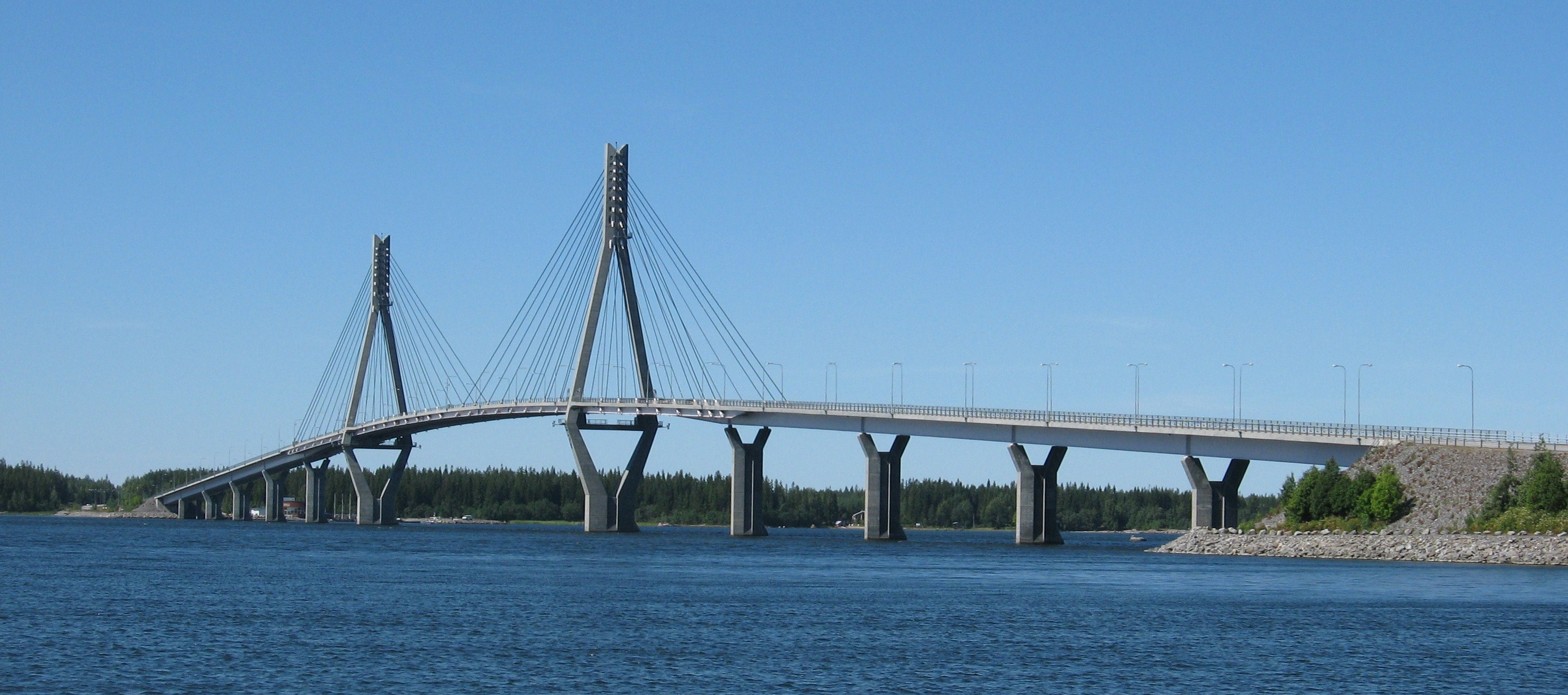
- The bridge as seen from the Fjärdskäret skerry
- Coordinates: 63°12′24″N 021°28′20″E
- Carries: 2 lanes of Finnish regional road 724
- Locale: Korsholm, Finland
- Official name: Swedish: Replotbron; Finnish: Raippaluodon silta
- Maintained by: Finnish Road Administration

Characteristics
- Design: cable-stayed tuftform
- Total length: 1,045 m (3,428 ft)
- Width: 12 m (39 ft)
- Height: 82.5 m (271 ft)
- Longest span: 250 m (820 ft)
- Clearance below: 26 m (85 ft)

History
- Designer: Insinööritoimisto Suunnittelu-Kortes AEK Oy
- Construction start: 1994-09-01
- Construction end: 1998-07-31
- Opened: 1997-08-27

The Replot Bridge (Swedish: Replotbron; Finnish: Raippaluodon silta) is a cable-stayed tuftform bridge connecting the island of Replot with the mainland in Korsholm, near Vaasa, Finland. It is 1,045 metres (3,428 ft) long and the second longest bridge in Finland. Two supporting pylons are both 82.5 m (271 ft) high.

The bridge was inaugurated 27 August 1997 by the president of Finland Martti Ahtisaari.

== Gallery ==
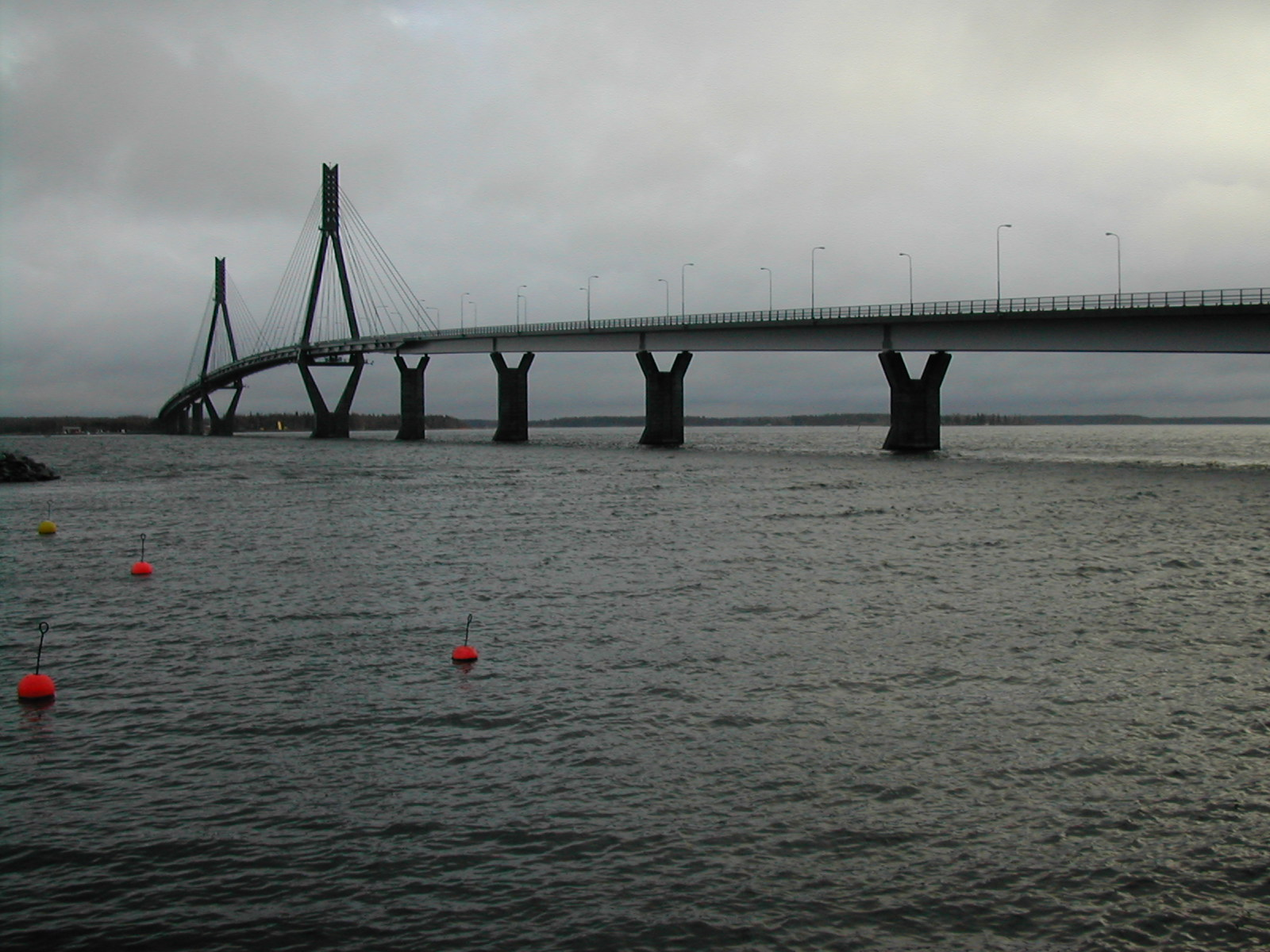
The Replot Bridge on a grey autumn day

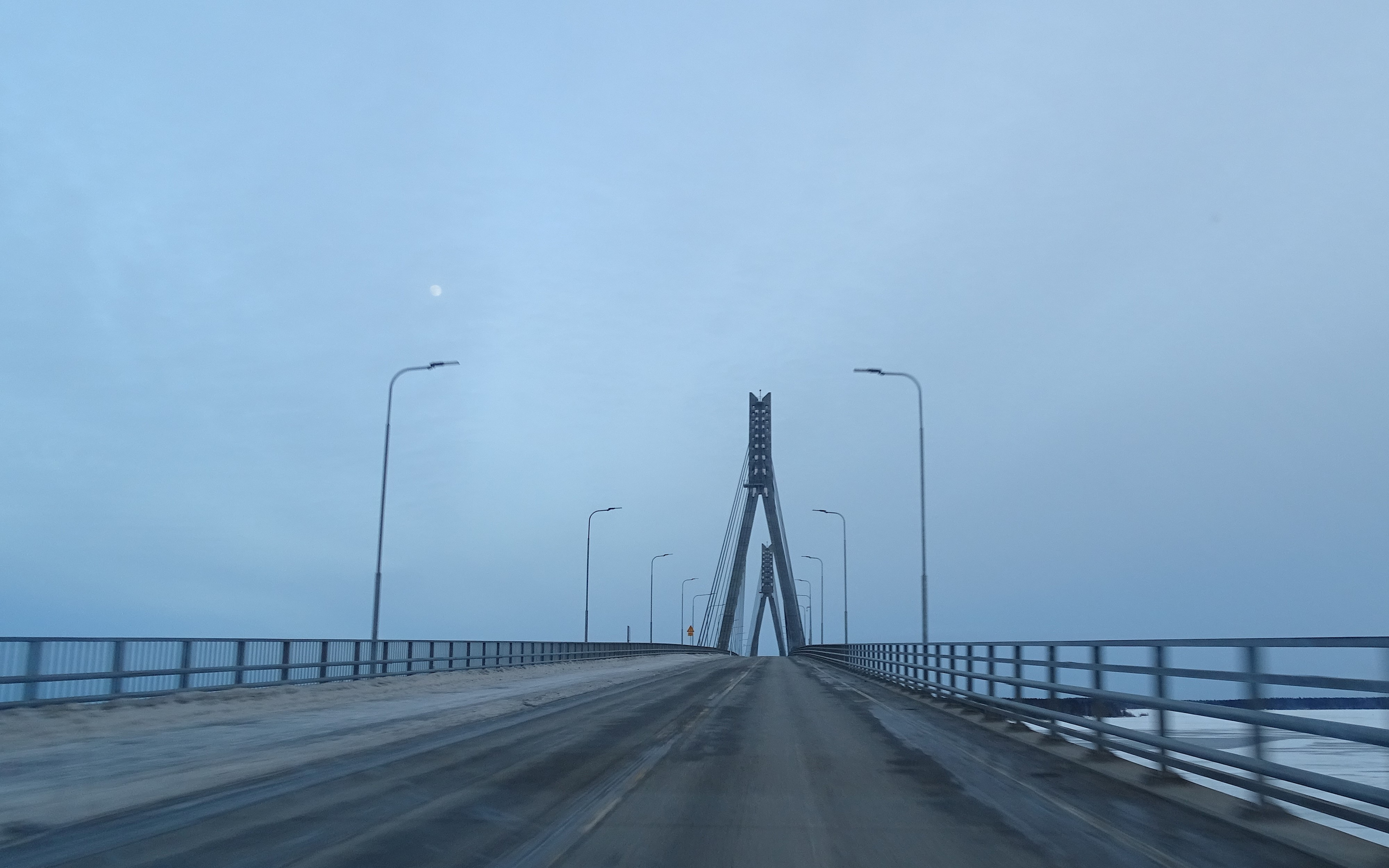
Approach of the Replot Bridge from the west
