= Johannes Bengs =

Finnish politician

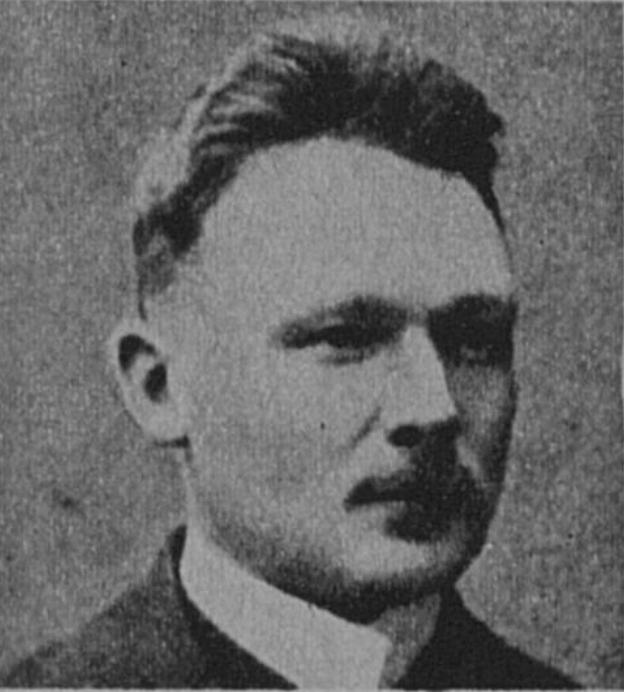

Johannes Bengs (2 May 1877 in Korsholm – 11 October 1936) was a Finnish farmer and politician. He was a member of the Parliament of Finland from 1922 to 1924, representing the Swedish People's Party of Finland (SFP).
