= Levi Jern =

Finnish politician

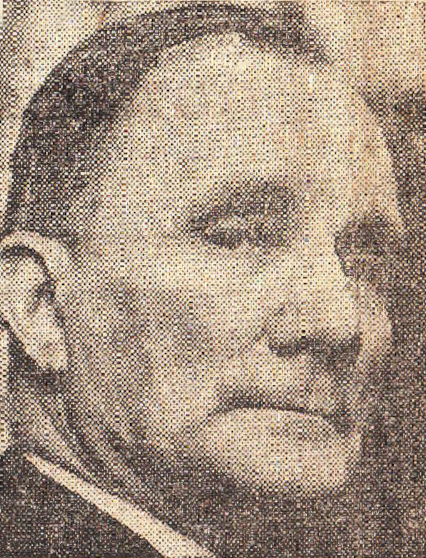
Finnish parliamentarian Levi Jern

Johan Levi Jern (22 September 1893, Korsholm - 22 May 1973) was a Finnish farmer and politician. He was a member of the Parliament of Finland from 1922 to 1954, representing the Swedish People's Party of Finland (SFP). During the Continuation War, he was one of the signatories of the "Petition of the Thirty-three", which was presented to President Ryti by members of the Peace opposition on 20 August 1943.
