= Mats Lillhannus =

Finnish tenor singer (born 1972)

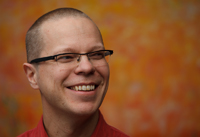

Background information
- Born: 1972 (age 52–53); Korsholm, Finland
- Genres: Classical
- Instrument: Vocals (tenor)

Mats Lillhannus (born 1972) is a Finnish tenor singer. He is an ensemble singer specialised in early music.

Lillhannus was born in Korsholm, and started his musical career as a jazz trumpeter, but his interest in singing and early music was awakened already in the early 1990s. After finishing school he studied musicology at the Åbo Akademi University and completed a master's degree in history of music. Lillhannus studied singing under the auspices of Veikko Kiiver in Stockholm and also took part in several master classes. In 2009–2010, Lillhannus participated in the master's programme AVES (Advanced Vocal Ensemble Studies) at Schola Cantorum Basiliensis in Basel, Switzerland.

Lillhannus works both as a soloist and an ensemble singer. He is artistic director of the vocal ensemble Camerata Aboensis, which he established already during his student years. In 2004 he initiated the chamber choir Key Ensemble. He is also member of the recently started international ensemble Apollo's Noyse.

Mats Lillhannus frequently appears as soloist in oratorios and cantatas. He also edits music and writes concert presentations for several music festivals. Mats Lillhannus lives in Turku, Finland.

== Musical Clips ==
- Camerata Aboensis: Jesu dulcis memoria
- Apollo's Noyse: Wert: Valle che de' lamenti miei
