= Kvarken =

Region of the Gulf of Bothnia separating the Bothnian Bay from the Bothnian Sea

- Norra Kvarken, Merenkurkku
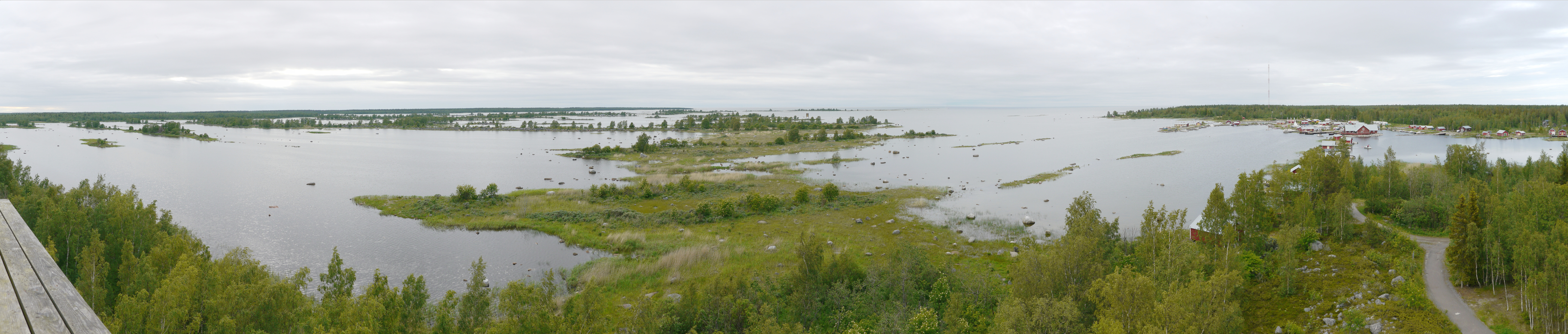
- View over Kvarken from Svedjehamn, Björkö, Finland
- Interactive map of Kvarken
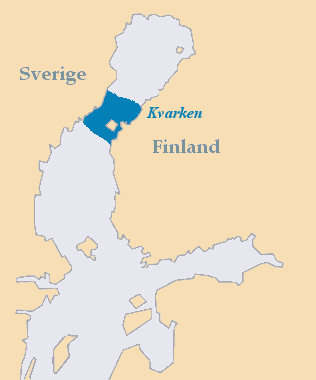
- Location: Finland, Sweden
- Coordinates: 63°30′N 21°00′E
- Type: strait
- Part of: Gulf of Bothnia
- Max. length: N-S: 60 km (37 mi)
- Max. width: E-W: 70 km (43 mi)
- Max. depth: 25 m (82 ft)
- Salinity: 4
- Max. temperature: 16 °C (61 °F)
- Min. temperature: 0 °C (32 °F)
- Islands: 6,550

Kvarken (Swedish: Kvarken, Norra Kvarken (as opposed to South Kvarken); Finnish: Merenkurkku, lit. 'throat of the sea') is the narrow region of the Gulf of Bothnia separating the Bothnian Bay (the inner part of the gulf) from the Bothnian Sea. The distance from the Swedish mainland to the Finnish mainland is around 80 km (50 mi), while the distance between the outermost islands is only 25 km (16 mi). The water depth in the Kvarken region is only around 25 metres (82 ft). The region also has an unusual rate of land rising at almost 10 mm (0.39 inches) a year.

Several attempts to cross the strait swimming have been made, but cold water and currents have usually been insurmountable obstacles. The first successful crossing was carried out by Lennart Flygare, Pavio Grzelewski and Tore Klingberg, who on 24 July, 2018, swam from Valassaaret (Valsörarna) on the Finnish side to Holmöarna in Sweden. It took them 12 hours 2 minutes to cross the strait.

== Kvarken Archipelago ==
Kvarken Archipelago
UNESCO World Heritage Site
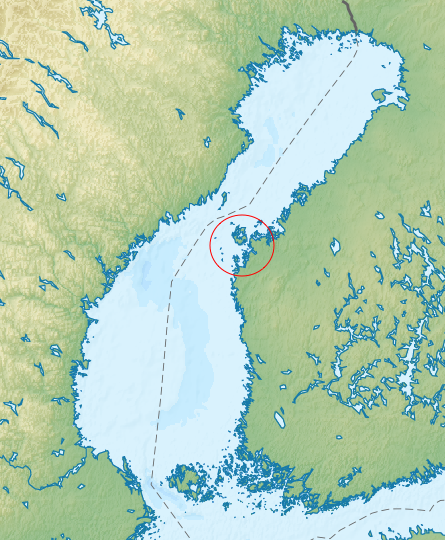
- Kvarken Archipelago in Finland
- Interactive map of Kvarken Archipelago
- Location: Gulf of Bothnia, Finland
- Part of: High Coast / Kvarken Archipelago
- Includes: 002: Zone A; 003: Zone B
- Criteria: Natural: (viii)
- Reference: 898bis
- Inscription: 2000 (24th Session)
- Extensions: 2006
- Area: 194,400 ha (751 sq mi)
- Website: http://www.kvarken.fi
- Coordinates: 63°18′N 21°18′E

On the Finnish side of Kvarken, there is a large archipelago, the Kvarken Archipelago, which includes the large islands Replot, Björkö and over 5,600 smaller islands. Most of it belongs to the municipality of Korsholm. Most of the small islands are inhabited. The archipelago is smaller on the Swedish side of the region, and the islands, part of Umeå Municipality, have much steeper shores. The Kvarken region was historically important also, because mail was delivered across Kvarken when the sea was completely frozen from the Swedish to the Finnish coast. This mail route was used frequently during the period when Finland was a part of Sweden.

During the Ice Ages, the Kvarken region was located underneath the Fennoscandian ice sheet. When the ice sheet retreated from the area around 9,600 years ago, the land, which had been compacted under the weight of the ice, rapidly expanded in a process known as isostatic rebound. The Kvarken region is known for having some of the fastest rates of this uplift on Earth, having risen 285 meters since glacial retreat. It continues to rise, demonstrating the effects of deglaciation on flat and shallow archipelagos. The Kvarken Archipelago is also notable for its unique moraine formations (called de Geer moraines), which form regular clusters that are parallel to the ice front. It is estimated that within about 2,000 years, the seafloor in this area will rise above water, splitting the Gulf of Bothnia into a southern gulf and northern lake.

In 2006, parts of the Kvarken Archipelago were added as an extension to the World Heritage Site of the High Coast (located on the western shore of the Gulf of Bothnia) in Sweden, because of its outstanding demonstration of isostatic uplift, and the influence of glacial retreat on the evolution of landforms and topography. The most Finnish parts of the High Coast/Kvarken Archipelago World Heritage Site are situated in the Korsholm municipality.

In the group of islands in the “middle” of the Kvarken region, in Swedish called Valsörarna – Finnish Valassaaret, is a 36-metre-high (118 ft) lighthouse designed by Henry Lepaute who worked for Gustave Eiffel's engineering bureau. The structural similarity between the lighthouse (built in 1885) and the Eiffel Tower (built in 1889) is quite obvious. The lighthouse is now automated as are most lighthouses in Finland.

== Transportation ==
The ferry route between Umeå and Vaasa connects Sweden and Finland at the narrowest part of the Gulf of Bothnia. The route is currently operated by Wasaline.

== Bridge ==
There have been proposals for a bridge across the strait, at a cost of about 1.5 to 2 billion euros. There are islands in the strait, and the sum of the lengths of the probably three bridge parts would be about 40 km (25 mi). The Swedish minister of finance has said it is an interesting idea, but the idea is still decades from being brought to fruition. There is a debate in the coastal cities on both sides, like Umeå and Vaasa. The official view from the Swedish and Finnish governments is that it is much too expensive, also put in regard that the cities are very small by European standards, as compared to Copenhagen and Malmö between the Oresund fixed link. The natural values of the area also make a bridge dubious.
