= Smedsby =

Village in Korsholm, Finland

Coordinates: 63.1143°N 21.7140°E

Smedsby (Finnish: Sepänkylä) is a village in Korsholm in Finland.
