= Alwar Sundell =

Finnish politician

Samuel Alwar Sundell (22 May 1906, in Kvevlax – 22 October 1990) was a Finnish Baptist pastor, peace activist and politician. He was a member of the Parliament of Finland from 1958 to 1966, representing the Swedish People's Party of Finland (SFP).
