= John Wickström =

Industrial counsellor John Wickström
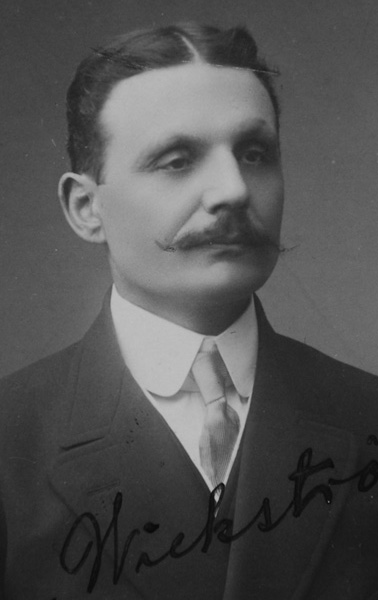
- Born: Johannes Wickström; 13 December 1870; Kvevlax, Grand Duchy of Finland
- Died: 7 June 1959 (aged 88); Vaasa, Finland
- Occupation: Entrepreneur
- Political party: SFP
- Board member of: Rakennus Oy Tekno
- Spouses: 1892–1919: Ida Maria née Östman (1873–1952); 1919–death: Julia Wilhelmina née Bergsten (1885–1973)
- Children: Sigrid Ingeborg (born 1893); Werner Theodor (1897–1997); Roy John Elias (1901–81); Alma Ellida (born 1902); Ingrid Brita Maria, married Sellberg, later Nordling (born 1920); Johannes Carl-Gustav (1922–2013)
- Parents: Johan Mickelsson Wickström; Brita-Lisa née West
- Awards: Industrial counsellor (1936)

John Wickström (until c. 1889 Johannes Wickström; 13 December 1870 – 7 June 1959) was a Finnish-Swede engineer and entrepreneur.

Wickström was born in Kvevlax, Ostrobothnia. He emigrated to the United States at age of 19 and settled in Chicago, where he studied engineering. Wickström specialised on combustion engines and founded company for automobile production, but, eventually, his interest focused on boat engines.

Wickström returned to Finland in 1906 and founded a boat engine factory together with his brother Jakob. The engines became reputable and sales grew until the 1950s, when imported outboard engines started to replace the heavy middle engines.

Wickström was married twice.

== Early life ==
Wickström was born as Johannes Wickström in the village of Vassor, Kvevlax, Ostrobothnia. His father Johan Wickström was a coppersmith, manufacturer and painter. The family had nine children, the oldest of which died at a young age. He attended primary school in his home village, but, from a young age, he worked in his father's workshop. He was interested at testing and creating; after seeing a picture of a bicycle on a Swedish newspaper, he built one for himself.

== Emigration to America ==
Like many other Ostrobothnians at the time, Wickström became interested in emigrating to the United States. After completing his school and confirmation, he borrowed money from his uncle for travelling over the Atlantic and left Finland in 1889. In the United States, he changed his name to John. Typical to Finnish immigrants, he became employed in a mine, but, due to his metalworking skills, he soon got a job in a plumbing company, after which he moved to a Chicago engineering company that produced pumps for pumping water inside skyscrapers. The company tested combustion engines, which were still undeveloped. Wickström studied mechanical engineering in North Park College, Chicago and was awarded some patents related to engines. Wickström's two younger brothers Mickel and Jakob moved to Chicago as well.

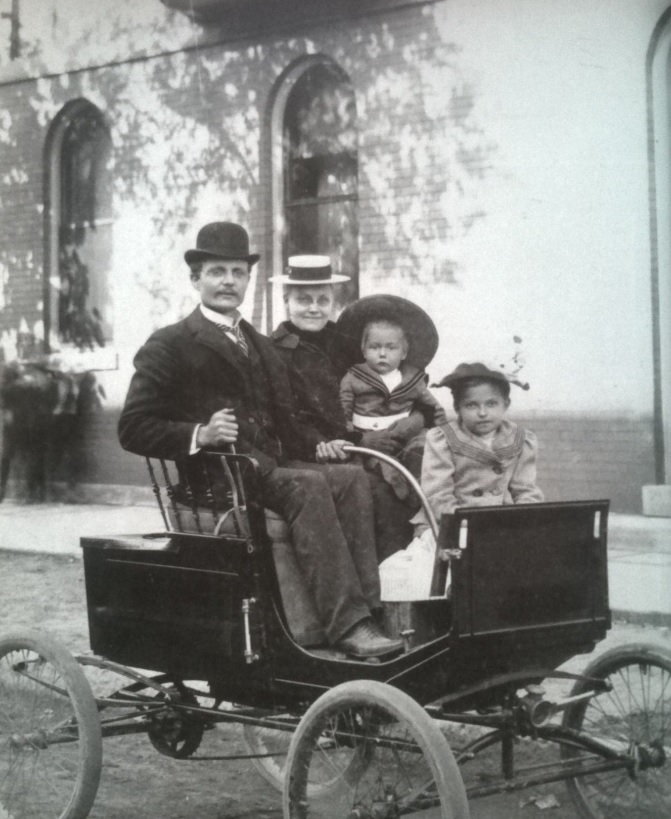
Wickström with his family driving his 1898 Caloric car in Chicago in 1899.

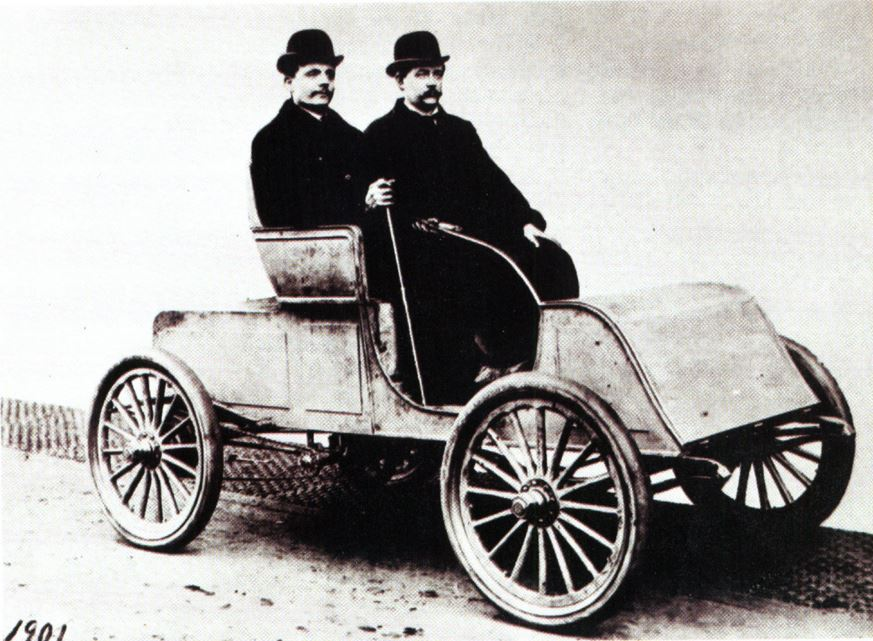
John and Jakob Wickström and 1901 introduced Caloric II.

Soon, Wickström focused solely on combustion engines and founded Chicago Motor Cycle Coach Co. for automobile production in 1898. The first car, branded the Caloric, was produced in the same year. Caloric featured a 10–12-hp petrol engine, and it gained attention on streets of Chicago. The car was further developed and at the early 20th century an upgraded Caloric II was introduced. Reportedly, Caloric was displayed in the first Chicago Automobile Exhibit in 1901. However, less than ten Caloric cars are known to be produced.

Wickström kept his focus on boat engine production. He ran the Chicago Caloric Engine Company with his business partners. The company built boat engines and repaired cars in its premises located on Wabash Avenue. The boat engines were used at lakes Michigan and Superior. Wickström was involved in a third company called Economy Engine Company.

== Return to Finland ==
Wickström had difficulties finding financing for engine development; he had to focus the production on existing, although still profitable, models. By using the property he had collected during his stay in the United States, Wickström believed he would be able to continue development of fishing boat engines in Finland, which was still an untapped market.

Upon returning to Finland in 1906, Wickström had to create a market for his engines. Ostrobothnian fishermen, used to propelling themselves by rowing or sailing over many generations, were wary of combustion engines. In order to convince the potential clientele about the benefits of engine power, Wickström arranged an American-style show event in which he tugged two boats loaded with people by a motor boat up along the Kyrönjoki River. Despite the excessive load, the travelling took less than one third the time compared to rowing. Consequently, Wickström's engines gained a lot of attention and the demand grew high enough that Wickström could start serial production.

== Wickström engine production ==
Wickström founded a boat engine factory in Palosaari, Vaasa together with his brother Jakob who also returned from America; the third emigrated brother Mickel stayed permanently in the United States. The factory was opened in autumn 1906, and, in addition to boat engines, the company produced stationary engines for Finnish farmers to power threshers and other machinery. Production of Wickström-engines grew over time and, in 1910, the brothers opened a new facility in Vaskiluoto, close to Vaasa harbour. The company name became Bröderna Wickströms Motorfabrik Ab in Swedish and Wickström-Veljesten Moottoritehdas Oy in Finnish ("Wickström Brothers' Engine Works Ltd."). At the beginning, the brothers produced Caloric engines based on drawings which they had brought with them from America. As the engines turned out to be too complex and unreliable, the company developed modern four-stroke paraffin engines, which replaced the older portfolio.

Perdition will come, if our Lord or Wickström's engine won't help.

— Fishermen's saying.,

Wickström engines changed the fishermen's way of living drastically. Due to their higher speed, the fishermen could travel home every evening, instead of bunking in fishing lodges. In 1912, 150 Ostrobothnian fishing boats featured engines. Among Finnish fishermen, Wickström's products reached a reputation of ultimately reliable power units.

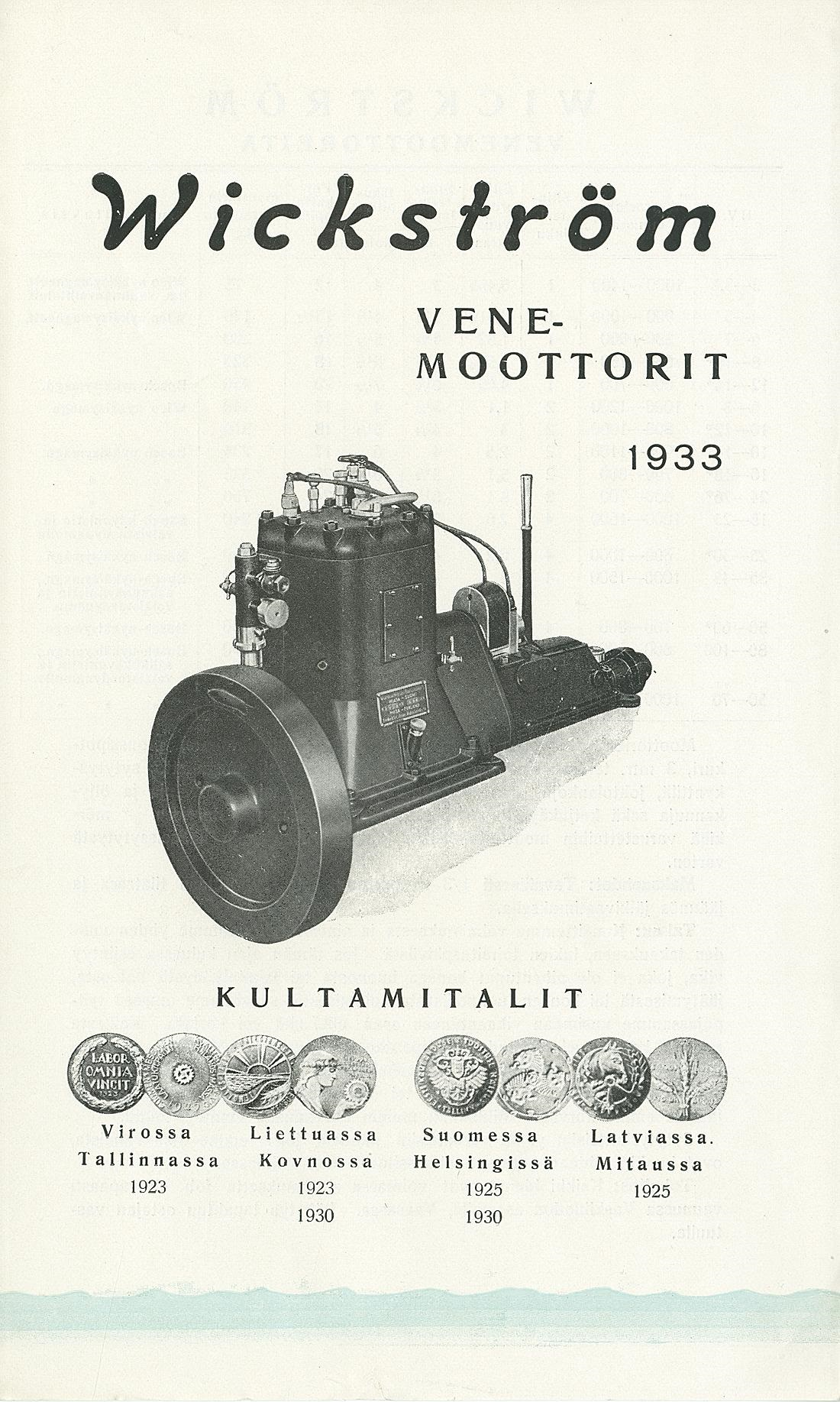
Wickström engine brochure from 1933.

After the modest start, demand grew especially after World War I, and the facilities were enlarged several times. In the 1930s, the annual production was about 1,000 units, and the portfolio consisted of a number of marine and stationary engine models. The company bought production licences for British Lister diesel engines. At the turn of the 1950s, the headcount reached almost 200, and the company produced thousands of engines per year. By that time, few other engine producers had started production in Vaasa, and the city became the centre of the Finnish small engine production. Wickström was the leading producer of small engines, and any other boat engine brands were an exception in the area. As demand of stationary engines decreased after World War II, the company focused exclusively on boat engines. Wickström engines were exported to Sweden, Norway, Iceland, Japan and Canada.

The Wickström Brothers' Engine Works had a good reputation as an employer, and workers typically made long careers in the factory. Wickström led the company until the end of his life, and he was an appreciated manager. He believed that the robust middle engines, which the company produced, would stay competitive on the market; he considered outboard engines to be rubbish and did not believe in their future. However, as light glass fibre boats pushed aside the heavy wooden boats, American and Swedish produced outboard engines replaced the middle engines over time. After Wickström's death in 1959, the company kept existing for a couple of decades. By then, the Wickström company had lost the spirit of innovation, although the main reason for its decline was the spread of outboard engines and subsequent disappearing of its market.

== Personal life ==
Wickström married Ida Maria née Östman (1873–1952) in 1892. Their children were Sigrid Ingeborg (born 1893), Werner Theodor (born 1897), Roy John Elias (born 1901) and Alma Ellida (born 1902). The couple was divorced in 1919; as divorcing was rare and generally not socially accepted at the time, a possible reason could have been rumours about Wickström's illegitimate son in the United States. In the same year, Wickström married Julia Wilhelmina née Bergsten, with whom he had Ingrid Brita Maria (born 1920) and Johannes Carl-Gustav (born 1922).

At an early age, Wickström committed to total abstinence from alcohol, and he took part in temperance society activities. In Chicago, he was a member of the local Swedish–Finnish temperance society (Svensk-Finska Nykterhetsföreningen Topelius), and he was chairman of the Swedish–Finnish Temperance Federation (Svensk-Finska Nykterhetsförbundet). In Finland, Wickström supported prohibition.

Wickström was a founding member of the Finnish Odd Fellows fraternity in 1925. He was member of the Vaasa city council.

Wickström financed his birth municipality Kvevlax, his former school in Vassor village and craft school Kvevlax Slöjdskola. Many craft school students were inspired by Wickström's example, becoming entrepreneurs themselves.

== Legacy ==
The Vaasa City Theatre presented a play about Wickström's life. The performance, written by Antti Tuuri and directed by Erik Kiviniemi, had its premiere in autumn 2015. Jorma Tommila starred in the main role.

== Patents ==
Wickström's patents registered in the United States are listed below:

US Pat. No	Date	Title and link
650,576	29 May 1898	Hot-air engine
646,406	3 April 1900	Hot-air fan-motor
669,611	12 March 1901	Automatic water-feed regulator for steam-boilers
685,241	29 October 1901	Mechanical movement
685,367	29 October 1901	Combination air and gas engine
714,352	25 November 1902	Combined hot-air and gas-engine
714,353	25 November 1902	Combination hot-air and gas-engine
842,607	29 January 1907	Incandescent igniter for gas-engines
