= Björkö (Korsholm) =

Island in Korsholm municipality, Finland

Coordinates: 63°20′N 21°20′E

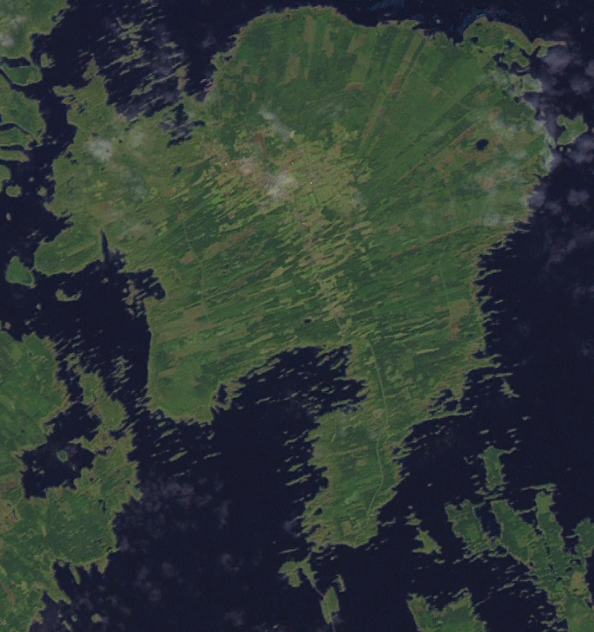
Satellite image of Björkö island, Finland

Björkö is an island in Korsholm municipality, Finland. It is situated in the Kvarken area of the Gulf of Bothnia. The chief settlement is called Björköby. In addition to the main island, the Björkö area includes 350 skerries and its total area is 72 km^{2}. In 1973, the Björköby municipality merged to Korsholm.

During the Swedish reign over Finland, the island was notable for being a post transport base in the archipelago on the Finnish side. Mail was ferried by the inhabitants of Björkö to the islands of Holmöarna, Sweden. They got reductions in taxes and exemption from military service for this (strategic) service.

Ferry services to the regional capital Vaasa began in 1907 and in 1954, a causeway was built to the major island of the archipelago, Replot, which was connected to the mainland by a car ferry. In 1997, the Replot bridge finally connected also Björkö to the mainland by road.
