= Jungsund =

Village in Korsholm, Finland

Coordinates: 63.18641°N 21.62046°E

Jungsund is a village in Korsholm, Finland. North Jungsund has a population of 410, while that of South Jungsund is 175. The village is located in the middle of Finland on the Westcoast. The first known inhabitants, in the 14th century, were named in old documents in Sweden (Finland was the eastern part of Sweden for about 700 years until 1809 when it was lost in a war to Russia). The population in villages in this area has always spoken Swedish and even today about 90% still does.
