= Pörtom =

- Former municipality
- Pörtoms kommun Pirttikylän kunta
- Coat of arms

- Location of Pörtom in Finland
- Interactive map of Pörtom
- Coordinates: 62°42′N 21°37′E
- Country: Finland
- Province: Vaasa Province
- Region: Ostrobothnia
- Established: 1859
- Merged into Närpes: 1973
- Seat: Pörtom

Area
  - Land: 220.3 km^{2} (85.1 sq mi)

Population (1972-12-31)
  - Total: 1,783

Pörtom (Finnish: Pirttikylä) is a former municipality in Ostrobothnia, Finland. The municipality was consolidated with Närpes in 1973. North Pörtom, however, was transferred to Malax in 1975.

The municipality was mostly Swedish-speaking.

== History ==
Pörtom was first mentioned as Pörttom, Pörteby in 1558. The name Pörtom is the old dative case form of the word pörte, a loanword from Finnish pirtti referring to a type of cottage. The village was also known as Pirttilä in Finnish.

Pörtom was initially a part of the Närpes parish. Pörtom acquired its first church in 1696 and a priest in 1702. It became a separate parish in 1859, remaining separate until it was transferred back to Närpes in 1973.

The Berga glass factory was active in Pörtom between 1796 and 1883. It was one of Finland's largest glass factories in the 1840s.

== Notable people ==
- Pali-Maija (1784-1867) - poet
