= Korsholm =

Korsholm Korsholm – Mustasaari
- Municipality
- Korsholms kommun Mustasaaren kunta
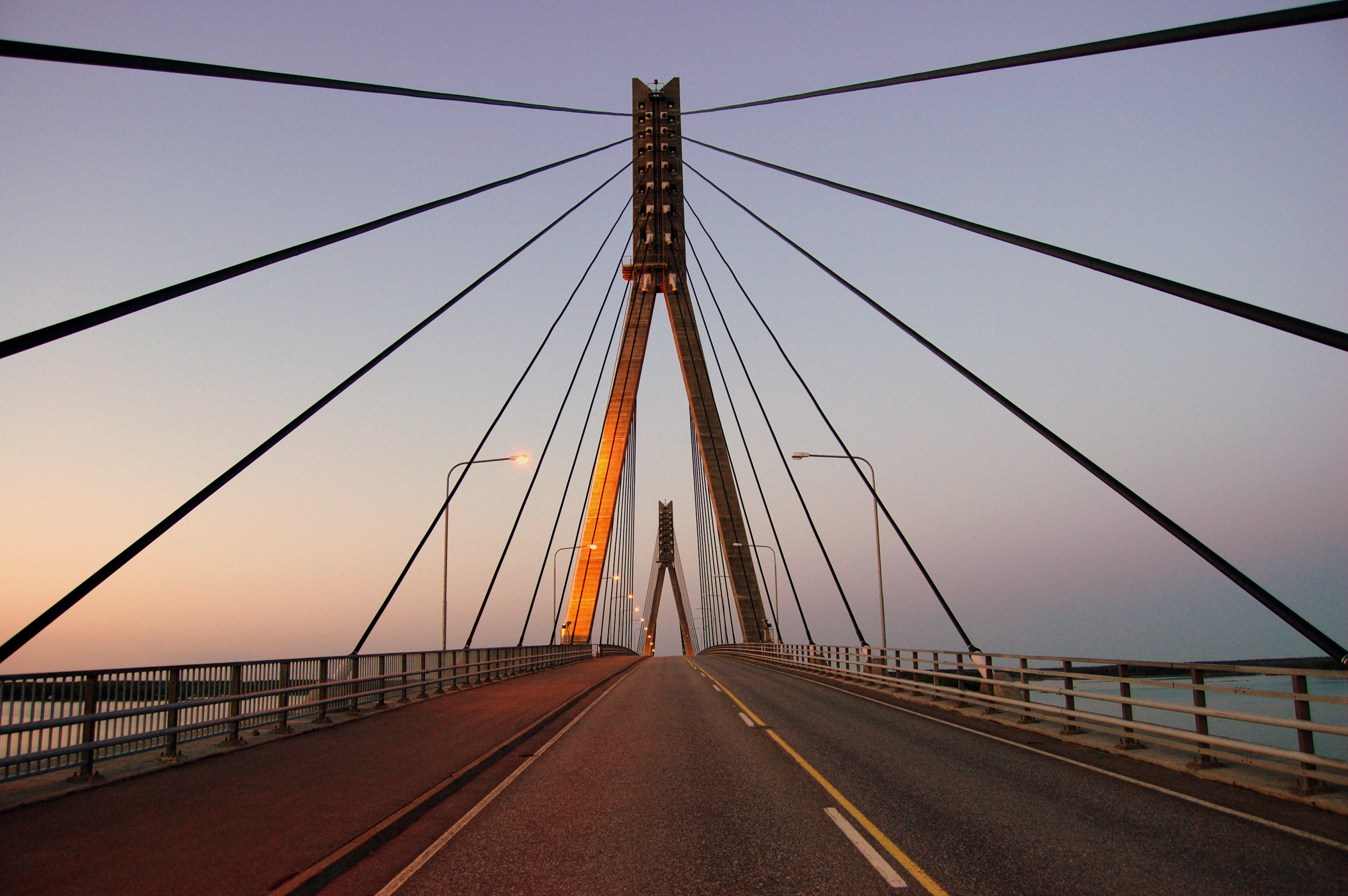
- The Replot Bridge connects Korsholm to Replot Island

- Coat of arms

- Location of Korsholm in Finland
- Interactive map of Korsholm
- Coordinates: 63°06′45″N 021°40′40″E
- Country: Finland
- Region: Ostrobothnia
- Sub-region: Vaasa
- Charter: 1348

Government
  - Municipal manager: Rurik Ahlberg

Area (2018-01-01)
  - Total: 3,178.59 km^{2} (1,227.26 sq mi)
  - Land: 849.49 km^{2} (327.99 sq mi)
  - Water: 2,330.49 km^{2} (899.81 sq mi)
  - Rank: 91st largest in Finland

Population (2025-12-31)
  - Total: 19,792
  - Rank: 55th largest in Finland
  - Density: 23.3/km^{2} (60/sq mi)

Population by native language
  - Swedish: 67.9% (official)
  - Finnish: 28.5% (official)
  - Others: 3.6%

Population by age
  - 0 to 14: 19.7%
  - 15 to 64: 58%
  - 65 or older: 22.3%
- Time zone: UTC+02:00 (EET)
  - Summer (DST): UTC+03:00 (EEST)
- Website: en.korsholm.fi

Korsholm (Finland Swedish: [korsˈholm]; Finnish: Mustasaari) is a municipality in Finland, located on the west coast of the country. Korsholm is situated in Ostrobothnia, along the Gulf of Bothnia. The population of Korsholm is approximately 20,000, while the sub-region has a population of approximately 112,000. It is the 55th most populous municipality in Finland.

The town of Vaasa was founded in Korsholm parish in 1606 and today the municipality completely surrounds the city. It is a coastal, mostly rural municipality, consisting of a rural landscape and a large, fractured archipelago. The administrative center is Smedsby, situated 3 km (2 mi) from Vaasa center along Finnish national road 8.

Korsholm is a bilingual municipality with Finnish and Swedish as its official languages. The population consists of 28% Finnish speakers, 68% Swedish speakers, and 4% speakers of other languages.

== Geography ==
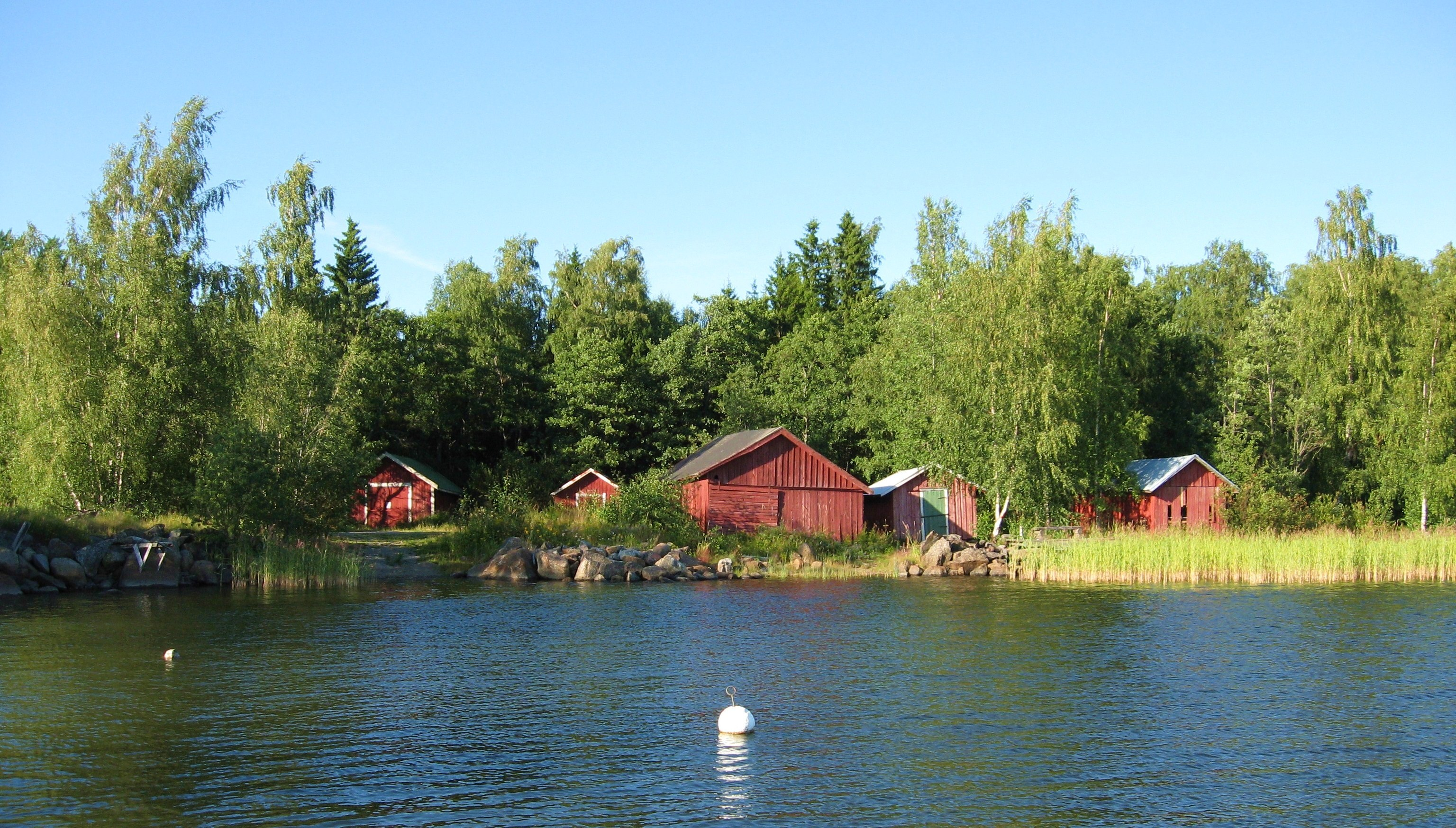
Falu red boathouses in Grönvik, a typical scenery in coastal Korsholm. Rugged glacial stones washed by the sea armor the gently sloping shore forested with silver birch.

It is located in the province of Western Finland and is part of the Ostrobothnia region. The municipality consists of the central areas, the southern plain, and the extensive archipelago. Parts of the archipelago belong to the UNESCO World Heritage Site of Kvarken.

One of Korsholm's more notable landmarks is that it holds Finland's longest bridge, the Replot Bridge. The bridge connects the island of Replot to the mainland. Finland's second oldest stone bridge that is still in use, can also be found in Korsholm, in the village of Toby.

Major islands in the archipelago include Replot, Björkö, Köklot, Panike and the Valsörarna archipelago.

Along the coast, Korsholm extends to two river outlets: Kyrönjoki river flows into the Vassor bay of the Gulf of Bothnia, and the Laihianjoki river flows into Vanhankaupunginlahti, the bay on whose shore the city of Vaasa is located.

=== Villages ===
- Anixor
- Brändövik
- Böle
- Björköby
- Västerhankmo
- Österhankmo
- Helsingby
- Iskmo
- Jungsund
- Kalvholm
- Karkmo (Karkkimala)
- Karperö
- Köklot
- Kvevlax (Koivulahti)
- Koskö
- Kuni
- Martois (Martoinen)
- Miekka
- Munsmo
- Norra Vallgrund
- Österhankmo
- Panike
- Petsmo
- Pundars (Puntainen)
- Replot (Raippaluodon kirkonkylä)
- Rimal
- Runsor
- Singsby
- Smedsby (Sepänkylä)
- Solf (Sulva)
- Söderudden
- Södra Vallgrund
- Staversby
- Toby (Tuovila)
- Tölby
- Vassor
- Veikars (Veikkaala)
- Vikby
- Vistan
- Voitby

(Most villages have only a Swedish name. Finnish name in parentheses.)

== History ==
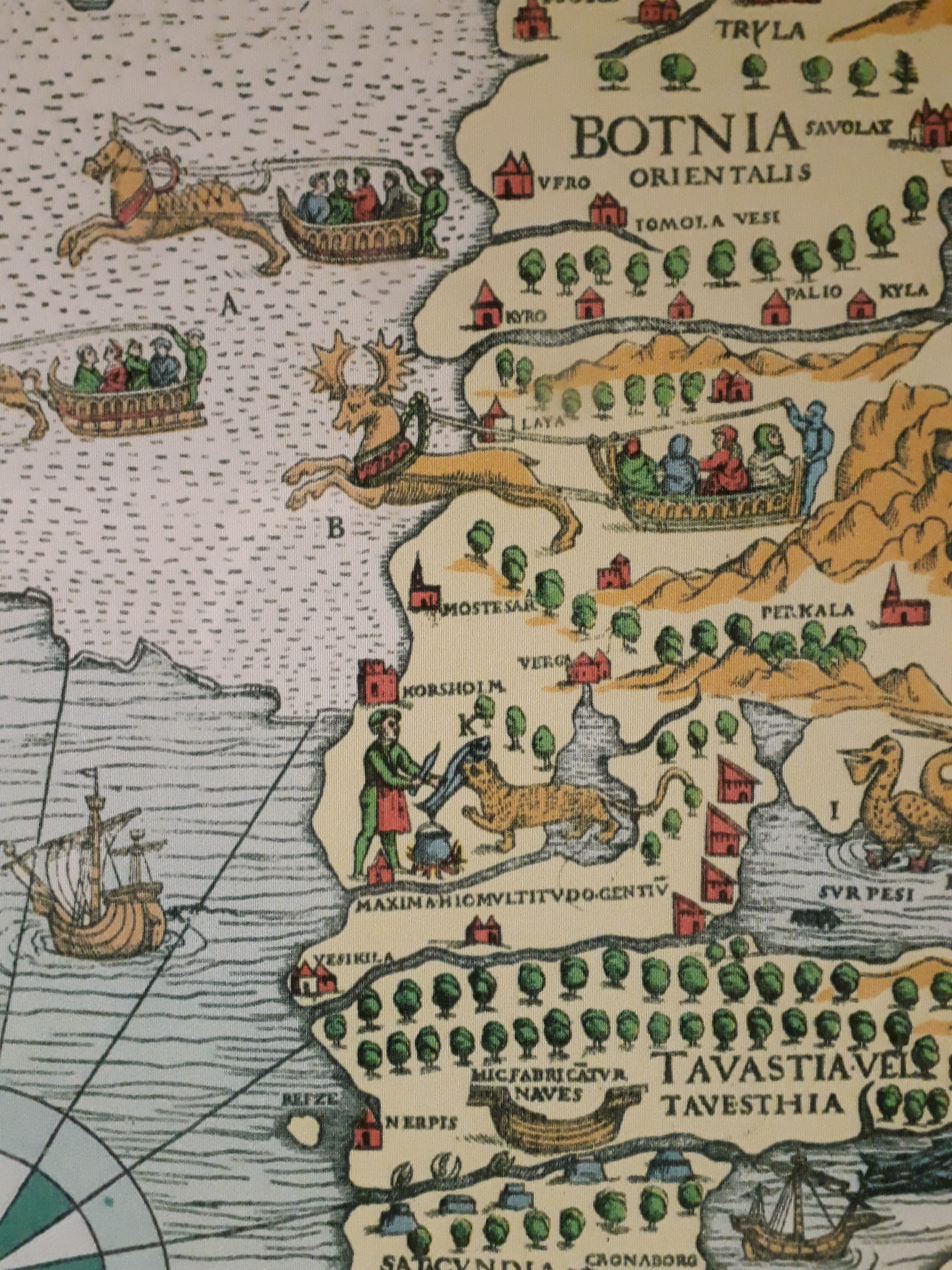
Korsholm and Mostesar appear separately in Olaus Magnus' 1539 map, Carta Marina.

=== Name ===
The original Finnish name Mustasaari "Black Island" may have been a medieval island cleared by a wildfire or an island that looks dark when approaching from the sea. Due to isostatic uplift, the area referred to is now inland. The parish is first mentioned as Mustasaari parish in 1348. In Swedish, the pronunciation developed into Mussor, although the form Mustasaari remained in use in the community. Mikael Agricola, the founder of written Finnish, spelled it Mustsåår in 1530. Olaus Magnus spelled it as Mostesar in his 1539 map, Carta Marina, where the castle appeared separately as "Korsholm". In 1606–1611, it was known as Mussar, but in 1611 the city of Vaasa was founded in the parish and thus the parish was known as Vaasa. In 1772, it was known as "city of Vaasa and Mustasaari annex", and in 1807–1867 "parish of Vaasa and Mustasaari". Since then, Vaasa has been an independent parish. The municipality was named Korsholm in Swedish in 1927, after the medieval Korsholma castle.

=== Middle Ages ===
Korsholm has a history that can be dated back to 1348. In that year Korsholm was mentioned for the first time in writing in a royal letter concerning freedom of commerce. Therefore, the municipality celebrated its 650th anniversary in 1998. In the mid-14th century Saint Mary's Church was built in Korsholm island. The whole of Ostrobothnia was governed for hundreds of years from Korsholma Castle (Chrysseborg). The ruins of Saint Mary's Church and Korsholm Castle are now in the old town of Vaasa (Finnish: Vanha Vaasa; Swedish: Gamla Vasa).

=== 1973 merger ===
Today's Korsholm municipality consists of five smaller municipalities that were merged in 1973: Korsholm in the center, Replot and Björköby in the far archipelago, Solf in the southern plain and Kvevlax in the eastern plain. To reflect the new, larger municipality the motif in the Korsholm coat of arms is five intertwined golden threads on a red background.

== Demographics ==
The municipality has a population of 19,792 and covers an area of 3,178.59 square kilometres (1,227.26 sq mi) of which 2,330.49 km^{2} (899.81 sq mi) is water. The population density is 23.3 inhabitants per square kilometre (60/sq mi).

Korsholm is a bilingual municipality with Finnish and Swedish as its official languages. The population consists of 28% Finnish speakers, 68% Swedish speakers, and 4% speakers of other languages. The Finnish speakers are concentrated near the enclosed city Vaasa, particularly in Smedsby, and in the villages of Toby and Kvevlax in the southern plain, while the rest of the municipality is Swedish-speaking.

In a 2016 statistical comparison of municipalities by Yle, Korsholm was rated 5/5 for viability and health and 4/5 for atmosphere (concerning e.g. education, crime and leisure), but only 2/5 for economy. Exceptionally good results were found in violent crime, which occurs at a rate of 1.9 per 1,000 inhabitants vs. the national average of 5.6, in the number of alcoholics and other addicts, at 0.6 per 1,000 inhabitants, vs. the national average of 3.3, and the proportion of youth smoking at 6.0%, vs the national average of 14.2%. Concerns were mainly economic: the employment self-sufficiency is only 57% vs. 89%, the equity ratio is poor (34.8% vs. 51.9%) and indebtedness is relatively high (70.4% vs. 48%), despite the municipal tax being the same as the national average (20.75%). Korsholm has relatively little industry and commuting to Vaasa is very common. Korsholm is neither losing nor gaining inhabitants by migration.

== Twin towns – sister cities ==
Korsholm is twinned with:

- Oskarshamn, Sweden

== Notable people ==
- Johannes Bengs (1877–1936)
- Herman Cederberg (1883–1969)
- Edvard Helenelund (1885–1976)
- Levi Jern (1893–1973)
- Alwar Sundell (1906–1990)
- Harry Järv (1921–2009)
- Stina Ekblad (born 1954)
- Mats Lillhannus (born 1972)
- Andreas Romar (born 1989)
