= Replot =

Island in the Gulf of Bothnia in the Baltic Sea

Replot Raippaluoto
- Former municipality
- Replot kommun Raippaluodon kunta
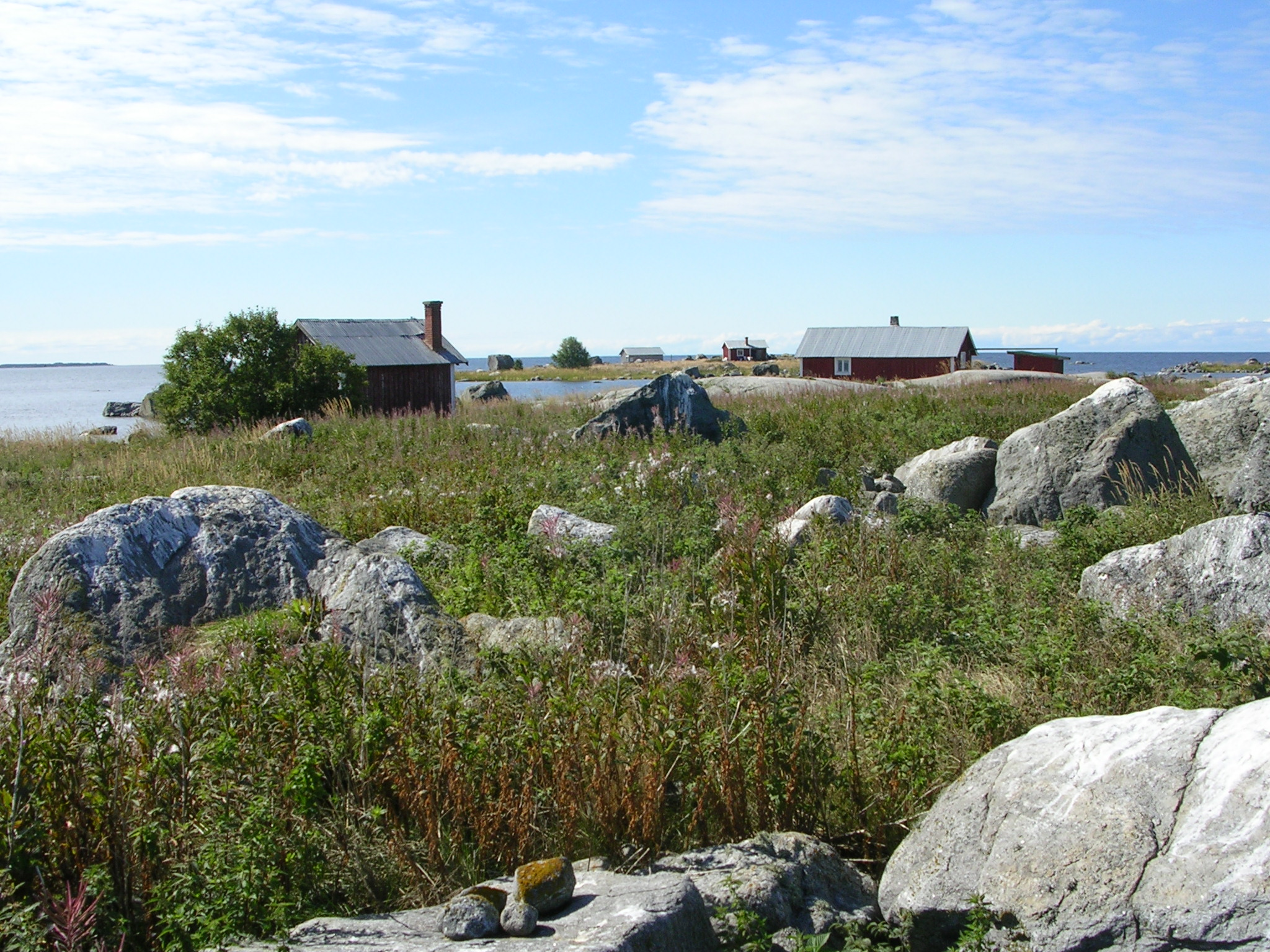
- Typical stony shore in the Replot archipelago.

- Coat of arms

- Location of Replot in Finland
- Interactive map of Replot
- Country: Finland
- Province: Vaasa Province
- Region: Ostrobothnia
- Sub-region: Vaasa
- Consolidated to Korsholm: 1973

Population (1972-01-01)
  - Total: 1,480
- Time zone: UTC+02:00 (EET)
  - Summer (DST): UTC+03:00 (EEST)

Replot (Finnish: Raippaluoto) is an island in the Kvarken ("The Throat"), the narrowest part of the Gulf of Bothnia in the northern part of the Baltic Sea. It has about 2,100 inhabitants, almost only Swedish-speaking. The size is about 150 square kilometres (58 sq mi), one of the largest islands of Finland. Replot was an independent municipality until 1973, when it was consolidated to the municipality of Korsholm, near Vaasa.

The area has been inhabited since before the time of Swedish dominion over Finland; the first habitations can be traced to at least the 11th century and possibly earlier. Today there are four major communities on the island, Replot kyrkoby, Norra Vallgrund, Södra Vallgrund and Söderudden, most of which are served by their own elementary schools, although some closures have occurred in recent years. Since 1997, Replot has been connected to the mainland via the Replot Bridge, replacing the earlier ferry connection which had been in place since 1952. The bridge is as of 2009 the longest bridge ever built in Finland, with a length of 1,045 metres (3,428 ft).

Replot is part of a larger archipelago and most of the smaller islands around Replot have traditionally been used as fishing camps. Today the buildings are generally used as summer cottages since maritime activities play a large part in the culture of the region. Fishing is nowadays mostly a recreational activity, but there are still a number of professional fishermen active in Replot.

North of Replot is the island of Björkö, which formerly belonged to the municipality of Björköby, which is also the name of its main village.

A large part of the Replot archipelago has been designated a UNESCO World Heritage Site.
