= Kvevlax =

Former municipality of Finland

- Former municipality
- Kvevlax kommun Koivulahden kunta
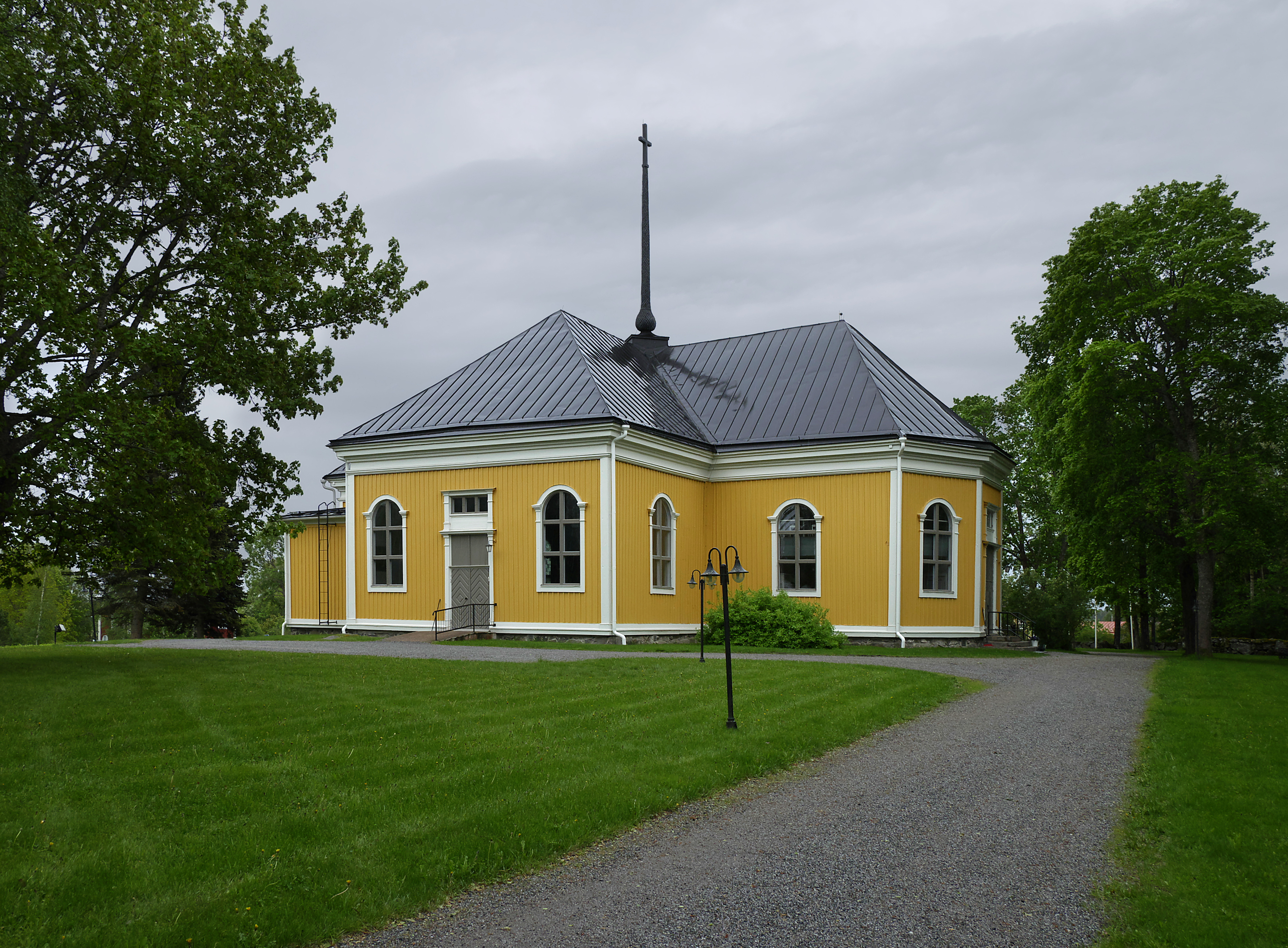
- Kvevlax Church

- Coat of arms

- Location of Kvevlax in Finland
- Interactive map of Kvevlax
- Coordinates: 63°09′37″N 21°50′15″E
- Country: Finland
- Province: Vaasa Province
- Region: Ostrobothnia
- Sub-region: Vaasa
- Established: 1857
- Consolidated: 1973
- Time zone: UTC+02:00 (EET)
  - Summer (DST): UTC+03:00 (EEST)

Kvevlax (Finnish: Koivulahti) is a former municipality of Finland in the modern-day region of Ostrobothnia. It is located approximately 15 kilometres (9 mi) north of the city of Vaasa. Kvevlax became an independent parish in 1857. Until 1 January 1973, when it merged with Korsholm, it was an independent municipality. Kvevlax has a lower grade primary education school, a kindergarten, a running track, a football pitch and an ice rink. There are two local grocery shops, a library and a bank. It is located within the Eastern European Time Zone (GMT+2)

== Flight 311 air crash ==
On 3 January 1961, a DC-3, the Aero O/Y Flight 311, crashed in Kvevlax, with the loss of all 25 on board. The DC-3 crash was blamed on alcohol-intoxicated and sleep-deprived pilots. The accident remains the worst in Finnish aviation history.

== Landmarks ==
- The Kvevlax Church, built in 1692. The church has a pulpit from 1696, while the organ is much newer, having been purchased in 1975.
- The Kvevlax UF house was opened in 1949, although the youth organization was formed back in 1895. The previous UF house burned down in the winter of 1940.
- The memorial to the air crash

== Notable persons ==
- John Wickström (1870-1959), engineer and entrepreneur
