= Bara bada bastu =

2025 single by KAJ

Single by KAJ

from the album Sauna Collection
- Language: Swedish (Note: The song also contains a few words in Finnish.)
- Released: 21 February 2025
- Genre: Bastupop
- Length: 2:46
- Label: Warner
- Songwriters: Anderz Wrethov; Axel Åhman; Jakob Norrgård; Kevin Holmström; Kristofer Strandberg; Robert Skowronski
- Producers: Anderz Wrethov; Kristofer Strandberg

KAJ singles chronology
"Dansgolv" (2024)	"Bara bada bastu" (2025)	"Mosquito" (2025)

Music video
- "Bara bada bastu" on YouTube

Eurovision Song Contest 2025 entry
- Country: Sweden
- Artist: KAJ
- Language: Swedish
- Composers: Anderz Wrethov; Axel Åhman; Jakob Norrgård; Kevin Holmström; Kristofer Strandberg; Robert Skowronski
- Lyricists: Anderz Wrethov; Axel Åhman; Jakob Norrgård; Kevin Holmström; Kristofer Strandberg; Robert Skowronski

Finals performance
- Semi-final result: 4th
- Semi-final points: 118
- Final result: 4th
- Final points: 321

Entry chronology
- ◄ "Unforgettable" (2024)
- "My System" (2026) ►

Official performance video
- "Bara bada bastu" (First semi-final) on YouTube "Bara bara bastu" (Grand Final) on YouTube

"Bara bada bastu" (transl. "[Just] take a sauna" (Note: In the English-language translation of the song's lyrics published on the Eurovision website, "Bara bada bastu" is translated as "Just sauna". KAJ have sung an English-language version of the song as "Only Take a Sauna".)) is a song by KAJ, a group from the Swedish-speaking minority in Finland, released as a single on 21 February 2025 through Warner Music Sweden. The song was written by the group alongside Anderz Wrethov, Kristofer Strandberg, and Robert Skowronski. After winning Melodifestivalen 2025 with the most votes in the history of the competition, the song went on to represent Sweden in the Eurovision Song Contest 2025, finishing fourth with 321 points.

A comedic epadunk song that celebrates Finnish sauna culture, its lyrics are in the Vörå dialect of Finland Swedish, with a few words in Finnish. It is the first Swedish-language song at Eurovision since 2012, (Note: At the Eurovision Song Contest 2012, Finland participated with the Swedish-language "När jag blundar" by Pernilla Karlsson.) and the first representing Sweden since 1998. (Note: At the Eurovision Song Contest 1998, Sweden participated with "Kärleken är" by Jill Johnson.) "Bara bada bastu" has received praise for its catchiness and journalists noted its departure from the "serious" pop sound typical of Swedish Eurovision entries. The song reached number one in Sweden, Finland and Norway.

"Bara bada bastu" spent 13 weeks at number one in Sweden, making it one of the longest-running chart-toppers since national records began in 1977.

== Background and composition ==
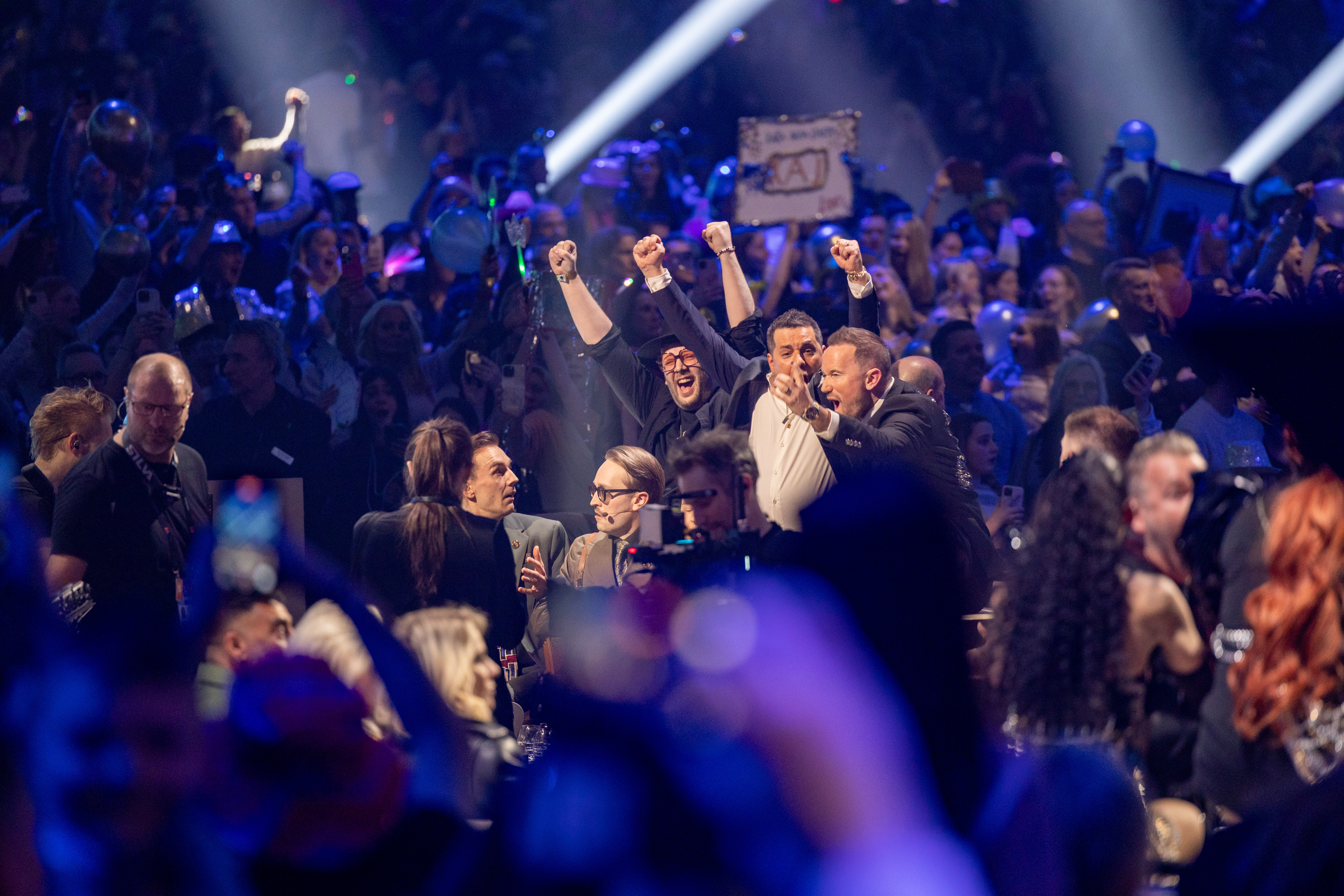
From left to right: Strandberg, Skowronski and Wrethov, standing behind the members of KAJ at Melodifestivalen; all six are songwriters on "Bara bada bastu"

In preparation for the 2025 competition, Melodifestivalen producer and artistic director Karin Gunnarsson contacted KAJ in 2024 to see if they would participate after reading about the comedy group in Dagens Nyheter; at the time, the trio had just released an album, which meant they had to write a new song to compete. "Bara bada bastu" was written by KAJ members Kevin Holmström, Axel Åhman and Jakob Norrgård, alongside Anderz Wrethov, Kristofer Strandberg and Robert Skowronski. Members of the songwriting team worked on the song remotely and all met in-person for the first time at Melodifestivalen. The members of the group KAJ are Finns, but according to competition rules, at least one of the songwriters also must be a Swedish citizen, so KAJ decided to work with Wrethov since they were fans of "Guld och gröna skogar". Norrgård, who provides lead vocals, said the group wanted to write a song showcasing Finnish culture and that they were inspired by the "weirdness aura" of previous Finnish Eurovision entries, referring to Käärijä and Windows95man. Strandberg explained that the idea behind "Bara bada bastu" was to make fun of how Swedes view Finns and aspects of their culture.

The lyrics of "Bara bada bastu" are in the Vörå dialect, an Ostrobothnian variety of Finland Swedish, and also contains some words in Finnish, including the expletive perkele. KAJ sent an "exaggerated" version of the song to Wrethov so that he could adapt it for a Swedish audience. The song mentions Finnish singer Arja Saijonmaa, who reacted positively to being included. KAJ expressed a desire for Saijonmaa to be featured in their performance for the Melodifestivalen final, and she ultimately appeared in a pre-recorded segment alongside competition hosts Edvin Törnblom and Keyyo.

Skowronski and Strandberg revealed that an early demo of "Bara bada bastu" contained a line about "dropping the soap", which was ultimately cut. KAJ contacted Bo Lund to play the accordion on the song, which was recorded in a two-hour session in October 2024; Lund had previously been the accordionist for KAJ's "Taco hej".

== Release and promotion ==
"Bara bada bastu" was released on 21 February 2025 on SVT Play and on streaming services via Warner Music Sweden. Its release on a Friday was a departure from previous editions of Melodifestivalen, where songs would not be officially released until after their competition performance on the Saturday. In April 2025, KAJ performed an acoustic version of the song for the Eurovision Song Contest's A Little Bit More series. Both the original version and a karaoke version are included on the track listing of KAJ's compilation album, Sauna Collection (2025).

Following their Melodifestivalen win, KAJ started selling T-shirts featuring the song title through their website, which were later removed for breaching competition rules. KAJ performed "Bara bada bastu" at three pre-parties: the MancHagen Eurovision Festival on 12 April, the London Eurovision Party on 13 April, and the PrePartyES on 19 April.

== Critical reception ==
=== Swedish and Finnish media ===
Professional ratings
Review scores
Source	Rating
Barometern	3/5 stars
Dagens Nyheter	5/5
Expressen	4/5 wasps
KULT Magasin	10/10
QX	5/5 stars
Yle	5/5

The song has received positive reviews from Swedish publications. Jan Andersson of Göteborgs-Posten and Johan Hammerby of Hallandsposten both complimented the catchiness and comedic nature of "Bara bada bastu", in a break from Sweden's usual "serious" pop numbers it usually sends to Eurovision. Ronny Larsson of QX called the song "wonderful Eurovision pop". Reviewing the songs in the Melodifestivalen final, Christian Gustafsson of Barometern said it was not the best song but that it had charm, something he felt the others were missing. Maria Brander of Expressen enjoyed the song's "total madness" and memorable nature. "Bara bada bastu" was also praised by Finnish media. Eva Frantz of Svenska Yle rated the song 5/5, praising KAJ's silliness and charm. Ilkka Mattila of Helsingin Sanomat complimented the song for appealing to people of all ages, especially children.

=== Media coverage in the United Kingdom ===
During an appearance on the ITV programme Good Morning Britain, presenter Richard Madeley described the Eurovision entries as "mad", "stupid", and "horrible". Jakob Norrgård responded with a call for a more measured tone, using the phrase "easy now" in an effort to moderate the characterisation of the contestants. Madeley went on to acknowledge that Sweden's entry was considered a frontrunner to win the Eurovision Song Contest 2025, describing the song as "ridiculously good" and noting its position at number one on Spotify's Global Viral chart.

When co-presenter Charlotte Hawkins asked about the group's experience entering the competition, Kevin Holmström stated that they began their participation in Melodifestivalen at the bottom of the betting charts, and that being selected to represent Sweden despite their underdog status had strengthened their determination to aim for overall victory. Madeley concluded the segment by suggesting the interview could become historic, comparing the situation to "interviewing ABBA before they won the Eurovision." Hawkins added: "We were first!"

Other British media outlets and social media influencers also expressed interest in the fact that a group from Finland was representing Sweden. In response, Kevin Holmström explained that the members are native Swedish speakers and long-time followers of Melodifestivalen, making the decision to compete for Sweden feel natural. Jakob Norrgård added that the group was proud to represent the Swedish-speaking population of Finland.

=== Betting odds ===
Based on betting odds, Sweden was tipped to win the Eurovision Song Contest 2025 before its contestant was chosen. Following KAJ's Melodifestivalen win, Sweden remained the bookmakers' favourite to win Eurovision, with their chances increasing by a few percentage points. In response, Norrgård said he wasn't following the odds too closely and Åhman revealed he felt more pressure during the last week of Melodifestivalen.

== Commercial performance ==
Following its release, "Bara bada bastu" debuted at number one on the Swedish singles chart. In Finland, the song topped the singles chart in its second week. Going into the Melodifestivalen final, the song had the most Spotify streams of all the entries, with twice the streams of the next most-streamed song, "Revolution" by Måns Zelmerlöw. However, "Revolution" had the highest audience impressions on Swedish radio whereas "Bara bada bastu" was eighth among the twelve songs in the final, based on airplay data from Radiomonitor.

The day after KAJ's Melodifestivalen win, the song reached the top of Spotify's Global Viral 50 chart and was among the top 150 most-streamed songs that day. On the same day, the song broke the record for the most-streamed Swedish-language song in a single day on Spotify, with 1,390,344 streams. (Note: The record was previously held by "Din låt" by Victor Leksell and Einár.)

== Eurovision Song Contest ==
=== Melodifestivalen 2025 ===
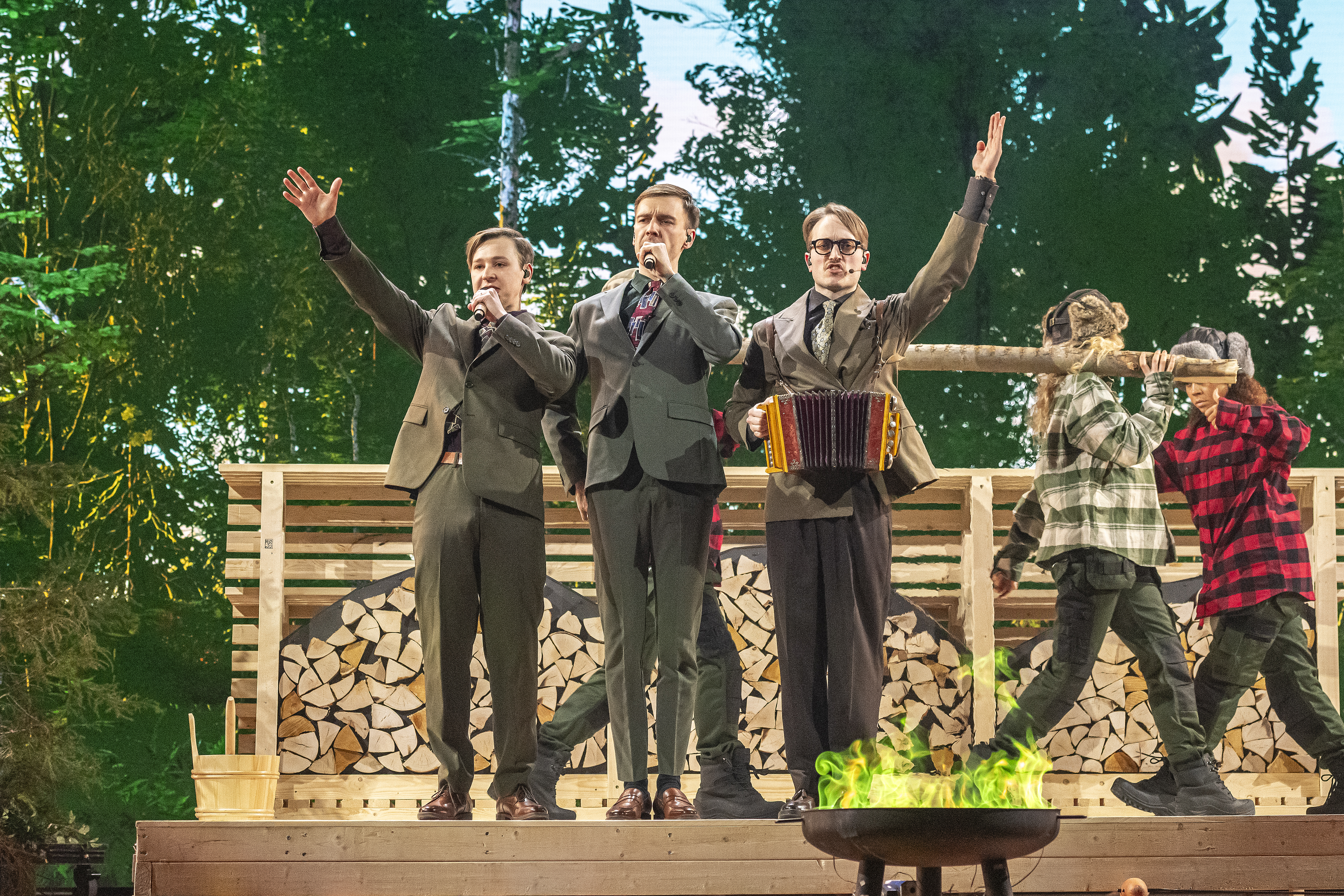
KAJ performing "Bara bada bastu" in Malmö

Sveriges Television (SVT), the Swedish broadcaster for the Eurovision Song Contest, organised Melodifestivalen 2025, a competition to select the country's entrant for the 2025 contest. A total of 30 entries competed, with KAJ performing during the fourth heat in Malmö on 22 February 2025. KAJ came in second place in their heat, qualifying directly for the final, which took place in Stockholm on 8 March. In the final, they came in second place with the international juries and first in televoting, ultimately winning the competition with 164 points. KAJ received 4,305,774 votes, the most votes in the history of the competition, surpassing the previous record of 3,783,148 votes received by Loreen's "Tattoo" from Melodifestivalen 2023.

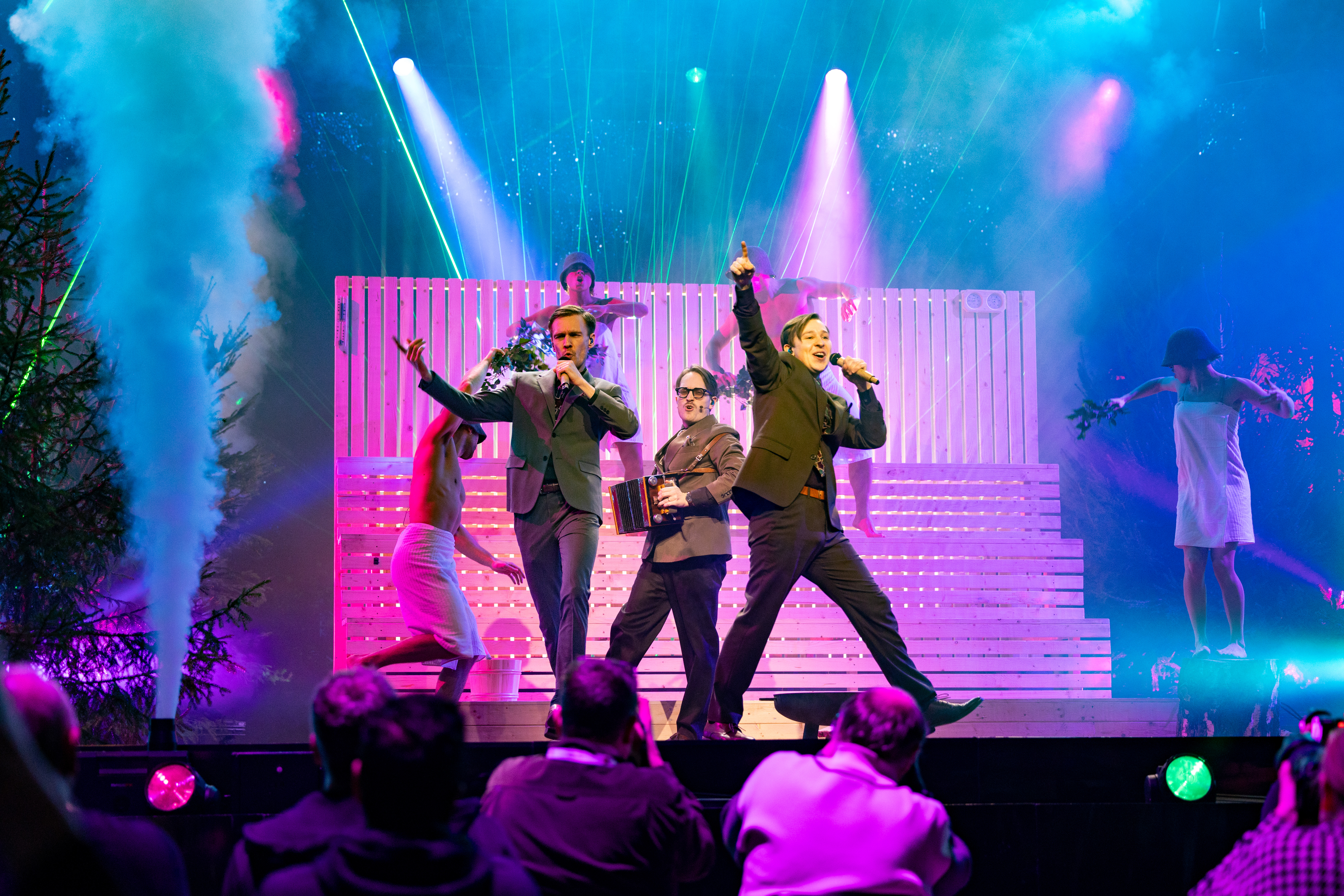
KAJ's performance for the Melodifestivalen final in Stockholm made use of lasers.

For their Melodifestivalen performance during their heat, the members of KAJ are surrounded by real spruce trees and sing the song in front of a woodshed, which is later converted to a sauna. In addition, a real falukorv is grilled on stage, and dancers wearing flannel shirts chop wood and later change into towels and dance with sauna whisks. Lotta Furebäck was the creative director for the number, while Keisha von Arnold, Zain Odelstål, Jennie Widegren and Sacha Jean-Baptiste served as choreographers. The sets reportedly cost a total of SEK 166,000 to build. For the Melodifestivalen final, lasers and smoke machines were added to the performance.

=== At Eurovision ===
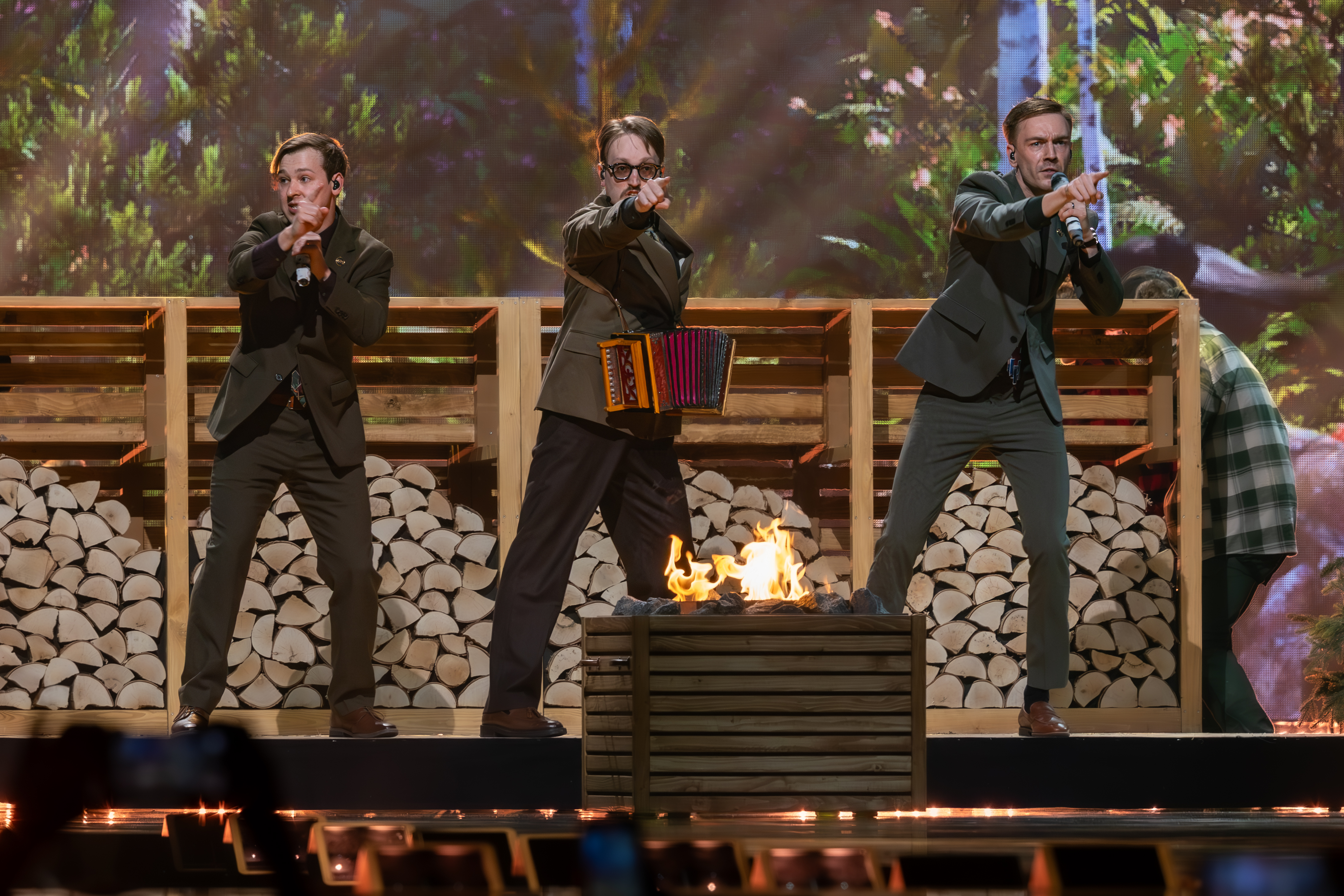
KAJ performing "Bara bada bastu" at the Eurovision Song Contest 2025 Grand Final

The Eurovision Song Contest 2025 took place at St. Jakobshalle in Basel, Switzerland, with two semi-finals on 13 and 15 May and the final on 17 May. Sweden was drawn to compete in the first half of the first semi-final, with KAJ later scheduled to perform sixth in the semi-final. "Bara bada bastu" is the first Swedish-language Eurovision entry since 2012, and the first representing Sweden since 1998. KAJ did not change the song's language for the competition. (Note: Carola won Melodifestivalen 2006 with "Evighet" and Lena Philipsson won Melodifestivalen 2004 with "Det gör ont". Both artists went on to compete in Eurovision with their songs translated into English.)

For Eurovision, it was thought that perkele would need to be replaced or removed from the lyrics, as the European Broadcasting Union (EBU) forbids profanity in the competing songs. In an interview with Finnish broadcaster Yle, KAJ revealed they had considered the minced variant perhana as an alternative, or another variant in the Vörå dialect. However, in an interview with Österbottens Tidning in April 2025, the group said that the EBU did not seem to care about the word's presence in the song. Further changes for the Eurovision performance include incorporating more lights and smoke effects, in addition to having one less dancer in order to abide by competition rules that limit the number of people on stage to six. The three dancers accompanying KAJ also provide background vocals and help with flipping up the sauna, which was rebuilt for the Eurovision stage. The sauna is slightly smaller, and consists of two pieces, in order to help with scene changes.

The song qualified for the Grand Final, and finished fourth with 321 points.

== Track listing ==
Digital download/streaming

1. "Bara bada bastu" – 2:46

Digital download/streaming – Karaoke version

1. "Bara bada bastu" (karaoke version) – 2:47
2. "Bara bada bastu" – 2:46

== Awards and nominations ==
Awards and nominations for "Bara bada bastu"
Year	Award	Category	Result	Ref.
2025	OUTmusic Award	Eurovision Song of the Year	Won	
2025	ESC Bubble	Public Reacts to Eurovision – Song of the Year	Won	
2025	OGAE	OGAE Poll	First place	
2026	Grammis	Song of the Year	Won	

== Charts ==
=== Weekly charts ===
Weekly chart performance for "Bara bada bastu"
Chart (2025)	Peak position
Austria (Ö3 Austria Top 40)	7
Belgium (Ultratop 50 Flanders)	42
Czech Republic Singles Digital (ČNS IFPI)	35
Estonia Airplay (TopHit)	69
Finland (Suomen virallinen lista)	1
Germany (GfK)	24
Global 200 (Billboard)	123
Greece International (IFPI)	5
Iceland (Tónlistinn)	3
Ireland (IRMA)	50
Latvia Streaming (LaIPA)	3
Lithuania (AGATA)	4
Luxembourg (Billboard)	14
Netherlands (Single Top 100)	12
Norway (VG-lista)	1
Poland (Polish Streaming Top 100)	15
Portugal (AFP)	168
Slovakia Singles Digital (ČNS IFPI)	71
Sweden (Sverigetopplistan)	1
Switzerland (Schweizer Hitparade)	4
UK Singles (Official Charts)	48

=== Year-end charts ===
Year-end chart performance for "Bara bada bastu"
Chart (2025)	Position
Iceland (Tónlistinn)	25
Sweden (Sverigetopplistan)	1

== Release history ==
Release dates and formats for "Bara bada bastu"
Region	Date	Format(s)	Version	Label	Ref.
Various	21 February 2025	Digital download; streaming	Original	Warner Sweden	
Various	9 May 2025	Digital download; streaming	Karaoke	Warner Sweden	
Italy	16 May 2025	Radio airplay	Original	Warner Italy	

== Chart positions ==
The day after the Melodifestivalen final, "Bara bada bastu" entered the 150 most popular songs globally on Spotify with 1.3 million streams. It was reportedly the first Swedish-language song to climb that high on the global chart. Spotify's Nordic music head Emma Vikström described the achievement, recorded on 9 March, as "sensational." By 17 April, the song had accumulated 31.8 million streams and had topped Spotify Sweden for 52 consecutive days, longer than any previous Melodifestivalen song.
