= KAJ (group) =

Swedish-speaking musical trio from Finland

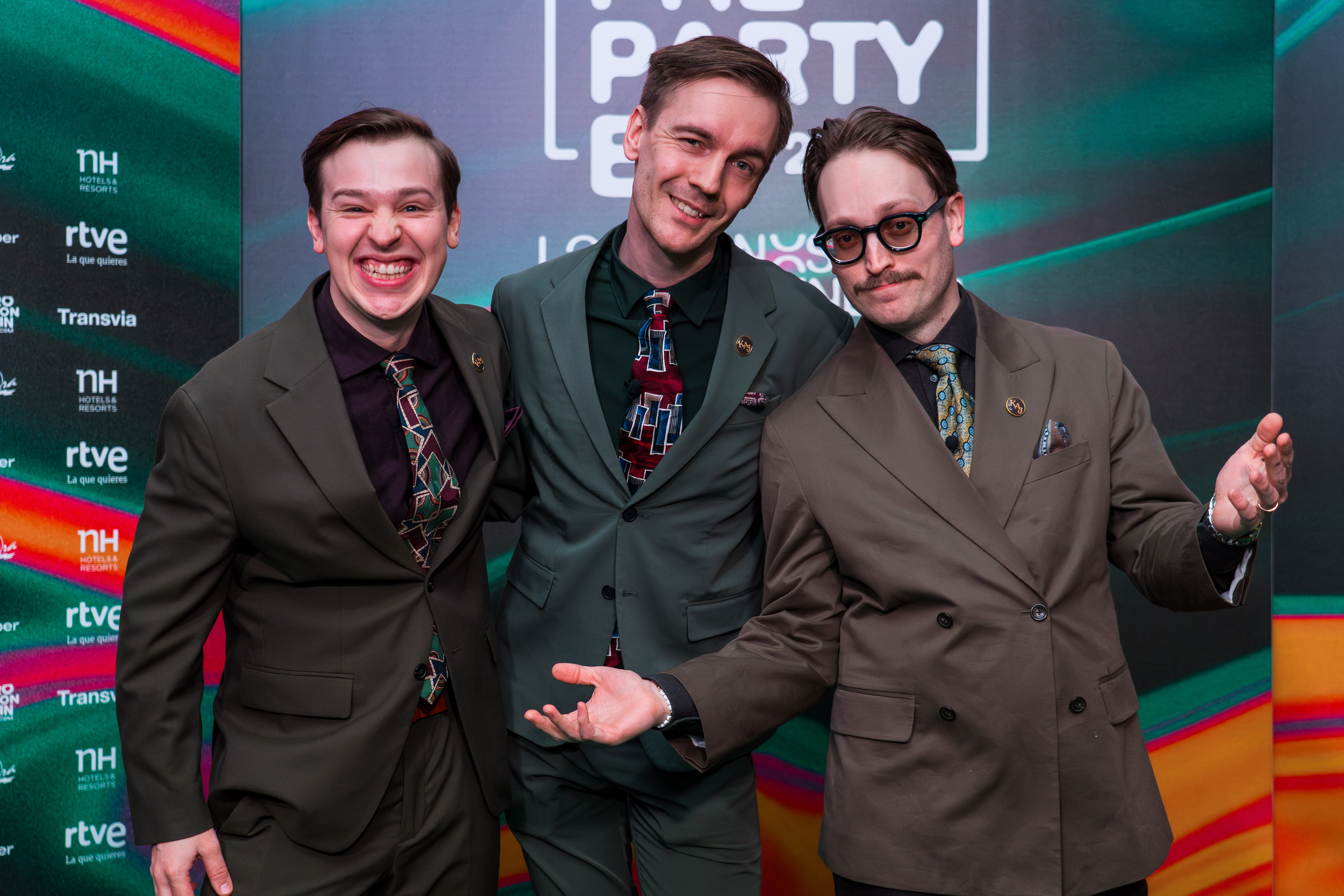
- KAJ in 2025 (left to right): Jakob Norrgård, Kevin Holmström, Axel Åhman

Background information
- Also known as: Vörjeans
- Origin: Vörå, Finland
- Genres: comedy; dance-pop; rockabilly; opera; rock
- Years active: 2009–present
- Labels: Pjas Productions Ab; Warner Music Finland; Warner Music Sweden
- Members: Kevin Holmström; Axel Åhman; Jakob Norrgård
- Website: humorgruppenkaj.com

KAJ (/ˈkaɪ/ KY, Finland Swedish: [kɑjː]) is a Finnish Swedish-speaking music and comedy group from Vörå in Ostrobothnia, Finland. The group is part of the Finland-Swedish cultural sphere and primarily performs in Swedish with lyrics in the Vörå dialect. The group consists of Kevin Holmström, Axel Åhman, and Jakob Norrgård, whose first name initials form the band's name.

KAJ's music spans multiple genres, including pop (K/J-Pop, latin), rock, rap, opera, disco, and schlager, often incorporating humour and satire. The group also has a satirical rockabilly alter ego called Vörjeans, which parodies raggare subcultures. The group has published lyrics for over 100 songs.

They represented Sweden in the Eurovision Song Contest 2025 with the song "Bara bada bastu", finishing fourth with 321 points.

== Background ==
Axel Åhman and Jakob Norrgård first met through football in Vörå, where they became close friends. Later, Axel met Kevin Holmström at a motocross track in Röukas, Vörå, where they helped push Axel's stalled Suzuki out of the woods. Kevin and Jakob met at a school disco in Maxmo, as they both had Axel as a mutual friend.

The trio later attended the same school, strengthening their friendship, and eventually formed KAJ in 2009.

== Musicals and awards ==
KAJ has produced two musicals at Wasa Theatre: Gambämark (2018) and Botnia Paradise (2021).

In 2013, KAJ were the recipients of the inaugural Leif Sjöström prize awarded by Harry Schaumans stiftelse. That same year, their song "Heimani i skick" won the award for Best Amateur Production in Film/TV/Video at the Finland-Swedish Nöjesgalan. In 2014, KAJ were awarded the Svenska Natten medal for their promotion of Finland Swedish dialects. In 2015, the group was awarded the title of Honorable Ostrobothnians of the Year. In 2021, KAJ won the Ostrobothnian distinction for Rural Face of the Year, awarded by Aktion Österbotten and Österbottens förbund. Following their Melodifestivalen win, KAJ were named the 2025 Sauna Promoter of the Year (Swedish: Årets bastufrämjare) by Svenska Bastuakademien, which it was awarded on 14 June. KAJ were named Finland-Swedes of the Year (Swedish: Årets finlandsvenskar) by the Swedish Assembly of Finland, and were also awarded the Swedish Assembly of Finland’s Medal of Merit (Swedish: Folktingets förtjänstmedalj) on 6 November 2025.

== Chart performance ==
On 16 March 2025, KAJ's song "Bara bada bastu" reached number one on the Swedish radio chart Svensktoppen with 192 points, marking the group's first time topping the chart. The song also topped Digilistan on 22 March 2025, after three weeks on the chart, climbing from second place the previous week. The song also topped Spotify's global viral 50 chart in March 2025.

== Melodifestivalen and Eurovision 2025 ==
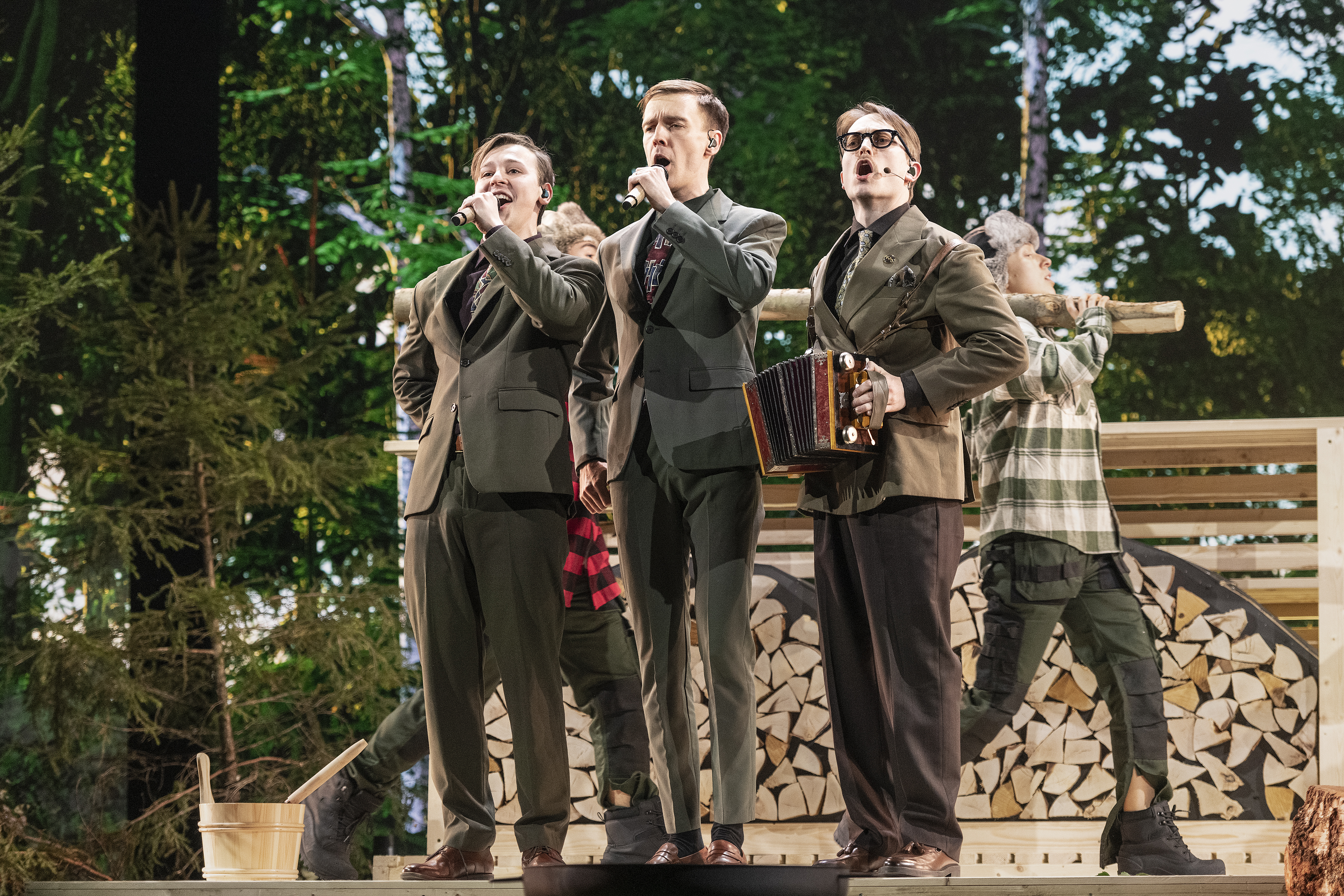
KAJ performing on 21 February 2025

In 2025, KAJ participated in Sweden's Melodifestivalen 2025 with the song "Bara bada bastu", qualifying directly to the final. They eventually won the final with 164 points, and represented Sweden in the Eurovision Song Contest 2025 in Basel, Switzerland. The entry was the first entry sung in Swedish sent by Sweden since 1998. The last time an entry was sung in Swedish at the Eurovision Song Contest was in 2012, with Finland-Swedish singer Pernilla Karlsson representing Finland with "När jag blundar". Before their performance, there was speculation that KAJ would have to change some of their lyrics according to Eurovision rules, because using the Finnish expletive perkele was prohibited. However, when the group performed in the first Eurovision semi-final on 13 May 2025, the lyrics were unaltered, with Kevin Holmström singing "perkele" in his verse.

Following their performance in the first semi-final, KAJ qualified to the grand final on 17 May, where they were placed fourth (out of 26 entries) with 321 points.

== Humour and music style ==
Kaj's songwriting spans constantly shifting genres and genre parodies, mostly within the pop and rock spectrum, including rap and electronic dance music, but also country, folk music, Latin rhythms, musicals, and an opera parody. The humour is woven into several layers with playfulness and wordplay which the Swedish Cultural Foundation once called "linguistic virtuosity". The lyrics often deal with very everyday phenomena. Playing with the contrast between the conventions of musical genres and the content of the lyrics is a common humorous technique, as are funny self-produced music videos.

Kaj's humour is described as folksy, kind, and friendly, which from the beginning has given them an audience ranging in age from preschoolers to retirees. The assessment that the humour is kind is often positive but has also appeared in negative criticism. The group often both praises and questions the subject matter of the song. By not taking a stand, the audience can like the song regardless of their opinion on, for example, Friday tacos or common opinions in their home town. The fact that the musical Gambämark can be interpreted politically with relative ease is an exception in Kaj's production.

Kaj has often been called old-fashioned. They themselves have embraced the concept of being old-fashioned and described their grandparents as major sources of inspiration. They have also written many songs about their home town and what it was like in the past in a way that one would not normally expect from young people. It was not until the album Karar i arbeit (2024) that the group felt that the prefix "little" in "little old" was starting to fall away, and that they were now writing about their own adult lives.

Small clashes between the Swedish and Finnish languages are sometimes mentioned, such as the swear word hurri in the song Kom ti byin (2016) when crossing the language border between Swedish- and Finnish-speaking areas. In both the song Tango taas (2012) and the musical Botnia Paradise (2021), situational comedy arises when the main character is poor at speaking Finnish. In Hupparipäivä, originally from the Yle Christmas calendar 2014 with lyrics in poor Finnish, including some made-up words, the group pokes fun at themselves on the same theme.

== Band members ==
The members of KAJ were born in three different municipalities which have since merged to form Vörå.

- Kevin Holmström (Finland Swedish: [ˈkevin ˈholmstrøm], born 12 December 1993) – vocals, guitar and other instruments. From Komossa in the former municipality of Oravais. Studied sound production and design for film and TV at Arcada University of Applied Sciences. Lives in the Kallio district of Helsinki with his wife. Their first child was born in February 2026. His cousins are cross-country skier Matias Strandvall and former professional footballer Sebastian Strandvall. He is nicknamed 'Big Kev' after the Australian businessman due to the fact he regularly exclaims 'I'm excited!'. The nickname was decided after a poll on KAJ's socials.
- Axel Åhman (Finland Swedish: [ˈɑksel ˈoːmɑn], born 6 February 1993) – vocals, bass, violin, saxophone and other instruments. From Palvis in the former municipality of Old Vörå. Is also a writer of short stories, children's books, and novels, having published four works since 2020. Placed third in the 2017 Arvid Mörne competition for Finland-Swedish authors organised by Svenska folkskolans vänner. Studied journalism at the University of Helsinki's Swedish School of Social Science and worked as a journalist for Vasabladet. Lives in Vaasa with his wife after previously living in Helsinki. Their first child, Flora was born in June 2026. Nicknamed 'Mr. International'.
- Jakob Norrgård (Finland Swedish: [ˈjɑːkob ˈnorːɡoːrd], born 22 March 1993) – vocals and melodica. From the former municipality of Maxmo. Studied photography and editing for film and TV at Arcada University of Applied Sciences. Was a radio presenter for Yle X3M in 2017. Lives in Helsinki with his fiancée. Nicknamed 'Schakob' after a skit with SVT, whereby Jakob humorously mimicked the British pronunciation of his name.

== The significance of dialect and language to the group ==
KAJ considers humour, rather than dialect, to be the central element of their creative work. They emphasise linguistic playfulness and relatability as key components in their performances.

Although not an explicit aim from the outset, the group has frequently been regarded as informal ambassadors for Finland-Swedish dialects. They have expressed that they do not reject this role. According to the group, dialects in Swedish-speaking Finland remain relatively robust, although regional distinctions — particularly within Ostrobothnia — have become less pronounced over time. Axel Åhman has noted that it was once common for older generations to criticise deviations in pronunciation, even between neighbouring communities, a practice that has largely faded.

The group has confirmed that they tend to adjust their speech when performing in Sweden, describing their usual variety as a "rougher Finland-Swedish dialect," which they acknowledge may be difficult to understand for those unfamiliar with it.

Dialect is regarded by the members as their native and most natural form of expression, used both in performance and in private communication, provided it does not hinder mutual understanding.

Among audiences in their native Ostrobothnia, the use of dialect was initially a distinctive and notable aspect of the group's identity. However, over time, the focus of audience attention has shifted more towards the group's humour. A similar pattern was observed when KAJ began performing in the Nyland (Finnish: Uusimaa) region, where the dialect initially drew attention but eventually became secondary to the comedic content.

The group is known for its playful approach to language. Following their rise in popularity in southern Finland through the viral success of "Jåo nåo e ja jåo yolo ja nåo", the group was invited by the radio station Yle X3M to attempt mimicking dialects from Nyland. According to the editors, KAJ performed the task successfully, with the result described as "in any case, much better than when someone from Nyland tries to imitate an Ostrobothnian dialect."

=== The group's relationship with the Finnish language ===
KAJ's relationship with the Finnish language has been described by the group members as marked by a mix of apprehension and goodwill. Their victory in Melodifestivalen 2025 led to broader recognition within Finnish-speaking Finland, where they had previously received limited attention. As a result, the group began appearing in Finnish-language media and conducting interviews in Finnish. In an interview with the Finnish public broadcaster Yle in February 2025, the members expressed nervousness about speaking Finnish but emphasised the importance of enabling Finnish-speaking audiences to engage with the group's activities and share in the celebratory atmosphere.

The group has, with characteristic self-irony, referred to their own use of Finnish as rallisuomi ("rally Finnish"). The term is a play on rally English, a humorous expression referring to heavily accented, grammatically simplified English, often associated with Finnish rally drivers and, more recently, the Eurovision performer Käärijä.

In March 2025, the Institute for the Languages of Finland (Kotus) selected rallisuomi as the Finnish "Word of the Month," highlighting KAJ's use of Finnish as a positive example of practical language application. According to the institute, it is more important to utilise one's language skills than to aim for flawless speech. Kotus director Leena Nissilä had addressed this perspective in a 2023 blog post, where she encouraged speakers to take pride in the courage it takes to use a developing second language and to overcome language-related shame.

== Music videos and performances ==
The group KAJ has produced music spanning a wide range of genres. They have often created unique music videos and occasionally released filmed live performances. Several of their videos have surpassed one million views on YouTube.

=== Heimani i skick ===
In May 2013, KAJ released the song Heimani i skick. After completing their conscription service, the group contemplated how to gain airtime not only on the adult-oriented Radio Vega but also on the youth station Yle X3M, despite performing in dialect and using acoustic instrumentation. This led them to invent their own genre, "pipp pop"—a form of hip hop that humorously centers around themes of intimacy, derived from the Swedish dialect word pippa. The term "heimani i skick" refers to the sense of security provided by well-maintained property, a concept associated with the attractiveness of Ostrobothnian men.

The song earned them the award for Best Amateur Production in film/TV/video at the first Finland-Swedish entertainment gala in 2013.

=== Jåo nåo e ja jåo YOLO ja nåo ===
In July 2014, KAJ released a Finland-Swedish summer hit with the single Jåo nåo e ja jåo yolo ja nåo. The lyrics depict a man from Pensala, a small town in Nykarleby, Finland, experiencing a midlife crisis and going out to test his appeal on the market. The title is a tongue-twister roughly translating to "Sure, I guess I'm YOLO, yeah."

The techno-style track with rap elements became the group's breakthrough across Swedish-speaking Finland.

=== Pa to ta na kako? ===
With Pa to ta na kako? ("Do you want some cake?") in July 2015, KAJ introduced the genre "KAJpop", a fusion of J-pop and K-pop according to the group. The song was produced in collaboration with Janne Hyöty, a Finnish music producer with success in Japan.

The theme centres around a grandmother who insistently offers her grandchildren food until they become nauseated, while the grandfather doubles the pacemaker speed. In the music video, the band performs on a rotating stage inside a microwave, with dyed hair—blue (Kevin Holmström), pink (Axel Åhman), and platinum blonde (Jakob Norrgård).

Cultural editor Patrik Back of Vasabladet ranked the song as KAJ's best ahead of their Melodifestivalen 2025 appearance.

=== Kom ti byin ===
The song Kom ti byin celebrates rural village life, highlighting the group's own hometowns: Maxmo (Jakob), Komossa (Kevin), and Palvis (Axel), with Komossa and Palvis being small towns in the municipality of Vörå.

It emphasises five benefits of countryside living: close-knit social ties, proximity to the sea, communal access to public spaces, creative coping with boredom, and a strong tradition of voluntary cooperation ("talko" spirit).

The song ends with a nostalgic reflection: You can take the boy out of the village, but not the village out of the boy.

=== Härkas (No var e nåo na twerkas) ===
Härkas (No var e nåo na twerkas) is KAJ's first animated music video. It features a DJ repeatedly told to "get a real job," reflecting the group's own artistic struggles. According to band member Kevin Holmström, the song is inspired by the slow path to acceptance through performance and audience response.

In the video, the DJ receives a call from a festival producer asking him to step in as a substitute because Avicii has "driven into a ditch"—a pun in which the Vörå dialect word diiki (ditch) rhymes with "Avicii."

The music video references the dance style known as twerking, characterized by hip and lower-body movements in a squatting position. The animation includes satirical elements featuring caricatured dance scenes with well-known Finnish politicians, including then-Prime Minister Juha Sipilä, Finns Party leader Timo Soini, and Christian Democrat Päivi Räsänen.

Härkas is a dialectal exclamation expressing astonishment or dismay.

=== Paavos barkbrö ===
Released in 2017, Paavos barkbrö is a patriotic tribute to Finland’s centenary of independence. It was performed at the Skolmusik 2017 festival in Botniahall with hundreds of schoolchildren. The song is based on the poem Högt bland Saarijärvis moar (also known as Bonden Paavo) by national poet Johan Ludvig Runeberg. The lyrics tell of resilience in times of hardship, as a farmer mixes bark into his bread and ultimately helps a neighbour despite his own struggles. The band members describe the song as blending Finnish melancholy with a touch of humour.

=== Nissan bromsa ===
Nissan bromsa is the group's parody of the aria Nessun dorma from the final act of Giacomo Puccini's opera Turandot. It was performed at the Alexander Theatre in episode 2, season 3 of the Svenska Yle series Nästan unplugged in 2018.

Kevin Holmström opens by describing how black ice had formed on the road and the car owner had neglected to switch to winter tires. Dressed in a tailcoat, Jakob Norrgård sings about the consequence: a Nissan car braked, slid into a ditch, and remained there despite futile attempts to retrieve it—first with a Renault, and then using a winch.

Phonetically, the Vörå dialect matches the Italian lyrics in several ways: guardi le stelle / bärgningsställe ("tow site"), splenderà / bränder å ("I set off"), and the final crescendo vincerò ("I will win") / gick vinschin å ("the winch broke").

The performance gained international attention in 2025 and was received positively, including by opera singers.

In 2025, Jakob performed another version of the parody titled Näsan domnar ("The nose is going numb") in both Stockholm and Vaasa. This version tells about Finnish phenomena of going to Estonia by a cruise ship to buy "cheap" alcohol.

=== Text-TV ===
In 2019, the group paid tribute to teletext with a song in the electronic music genre. The track is considered to be inspired by Kraftwerk and Pet Shop Boys.

In live performances, Kevin portrays a father who, seated in his armchair after a day of work, uses his remote control to read the "truth" on page 899—covering topics such as Bottas, the weather, and news. Axel is the primary soloist, and Jakob performs with a television set on his head.

=== Vörjeans ===
Vörjeans are the comedy group's alter egos, who perform rockabilly music. Under the names Tommy (Jakob), Freppa (Kevin) and Määnin (Axel), the group released the album Born to börn on 14 June 2019, which includes the song Volvoräägör.

== Discography ==
=== Studio albums ===
Title	Album details	Peak chart positions
Title	Album details	FIN
Professionella pjasalappar	Released: 30 June 2012; Label: Self-released; Formats: CD, digital download, streaming	—
Lokalproducerat pjas	Released: 27 September 2014; Label: Self-released; Formats: CD, digital download, streaming	—
Kom ti byin	Released: 9 October 2016; Label: Pjas Productions; Formats: CD, digital download, streaming	—
Gambämark	Released: 14 September 2018; Label: Pjas Productions; Formats: CD, digital download, streaming	—
Born to Börn (as Vörjeans)	Released: 14 June 2019; Label: Pjas Productions; Formats: CD, digital download, streaming	—
Botnia Paradise	Released: 10 December 2021; Label: Pjas Productions; Formats: CD, digital download, streaming	—
Karar i arbeit	Released: 10 May 2024; Label: Self-released; Formats: CD, digital download, streaming	32
"—" denotes an album that did not chart or was not released in that territory

=== Live albums ===
Title	Album details
KAJ 10 (Live)	Released: 7 May 2020; Formats: CD, digital download, streaming

=== Compilation albums ===
Title	Album details	Peak chart positions	
Title	Album details	FIN	SWE
Sauna Collection	Released: 16 May 2025; Label: Warner; Formats: LP, CD	1	9

=== Singles ===
Title	Year	Peak chart positions										Album
Title	Year	FIN	AUT	ICE	GER	LAT Stream.	LTU	NOR	SWE	SWI	WW	Album
"Heimani i skick"	2013	—	—	—	—	—	—	—	—	—	—	Lokalproducerat pjas
"Jåo nåo e ja jåo YOLO ja nåo"	2014	— (Note: "Jåo nåo e ja jåo YOLO ja nåo" did not enter the Official Finnish Charts, but peaked at number 25 on the Official Finnish Download Chart.)	—	—	—	—	—	—	—	—	—	Lokalproducerat pjas
"Pa to ta na kako?"	2015	—	—	—	—	—	—	—	—	—	—	Kom ti byin
"Taco hej (me Gusta)"	2015	—	—	—	—	—	—	—	—	—	—	Kom ti byin
"Paavos barkbrö" (live)	2017	—	—	—	—	—	—	—	—	—	—	Non-album single
"Volvoräägör" (as Vörjeans)	2019	—	—	—	—	—	—	—	—	—	—	Born to Börn
"Text-TV"	2019	—	—	—	—	—	—	—	—	—	—	Non-album singles
"Vems pojk e do?"	2019	—	—	—	—	—	—	—	—	—	—	Non-album singles
"Rejpelts Miss Valborg" (as Vörjeans)	2022	—	—	—	—	—	—	—	—	—	—	Non-album singles
"Håo håo vööbåo" (as Vörjeans)	2022	—	—	—	—	—	—	—	—	—	—	Non-album singles
"Firmans man"	2024	—	—	—	—	—	—	—	— (Note: "Firmans man" did not enter the Swedish Singellista Chart, but peaked at number three on the Swedish Heatseeker Chart.)	—	—	Karar i arbeit
"Dansgolv"	2024	—	—	—	—	—	—	—	—	—	—	Karar i arbeit
"Bara bada bastu"	2025	1	7	3	24	3	4	1	1	4	123	Sauna Collection
"Mosquito"	2025	15	—	—	—	—	—	—	35	—	—	Non-album singles
"Karaoke"	2025	—	—	—	—	—	—	—	—	—	—	Non-album singles
"Hurt Like You" (With just Fede and David Emde)	2026	—	—	—	—	—	—	—	—	—	—	Non-album singles
"Economy Plus"	2026	48	—	—	—	—	—	—	—	—	—	Non-album singles
"Gelateria"	2026	—	—	—	—	—	—	—	—	—	—	Non-album singles
"Man Cave"	2026	—	—	—	—	—	—	—	—	—	—	Non-album singles
"Dopp i grytan"	2026	—	—	—	—	—	—	—	—	—	—	Non-album singles
"—" denotes a recording that did not chart or was not released in that territory. "*" denotes that the chart did not exist at that time.

== Awards and nominations ==
Year	Award	Category	Nominee(s)	Result	Ref.
2013	The Leif Sjöström scholarship	Outstanding contribution to humour and culture	Themselves	Won	
2013	Finland-Swedish Nöjesgalan	Best Amateur Production in Film/TV/Video	Heimani i skick	Won	
2014	Swedish Night Medal	Positive promotion of the Finnish Swedish dialect	Themselves	Won	
2015	Ostrobothnian Federation	Honourable Ostrobothnians of the Year	Themselves	Won	
2025	OGAE	OGAE Poll	Bara bada bastu	First place	
2025	OUTmusic Award	Song of the Year	Bara bada bastu	Won	
2025	ESC Bubble	Public Reacts to Eurovision – Song of the Year	Bara bada bastu	Won	
2025	Finnish Music Publishers Association (MPA Finland)	Song of the Year	Bara bada bastu	Won	
2025	Finnish Music Publishers Association (MPA Finland)	Export of the Year	Themselves	Won	
2025	Swedish Music Publishers’ Awards	Spotify Sweden Listener's Prize	Bara bada bastu	Won	
2025	Swedish Music Publishers’ Awards	Song of the Year	Bara bada bastu	Nominated	
2025	Rockbjörnen	Breakthrough of the Year	Themselves	Won	
2025	Rockbjörnen	Group of the Year	Themselves	Won	
2025	Rockbjörnen	Song of the Year	Bara bada bastu	Nominated	
2025	Rockbjörnen	Fans of the Year	KAJ Fans	Nominated	
2025	Eurovision Awards	Choreo Monarch	Themselves	Nominated	
2025	Swedish Assembly of Finland (Folktinget)	Swedish-Speaking Finn(s) of the Year	Themselves	Won	
2026	Rockbjörnen	Group of the Year	Themselves	Won	

== Notes ==
Awards and achievements
Preceded by Marcus & Martinus with "Unforgettable"	Sweden in the Eurovision Song Contest; 2025	Succeeded by Felicia with "My System"
