= Widegren =

Widegren is a Swedish surname. Notable people with the surname include:

- Jennie Widegren (born 1973), Swedish dancer and choreographer
- Cecilia Widegren (born 1973), Swedish politician
- John Widegren (born 1980), Swedish politician
- Pontus Widegren (born 1990), Swedish professional golfer
