= Eva Frantz =

Finnish journalist and writer (born 1980)

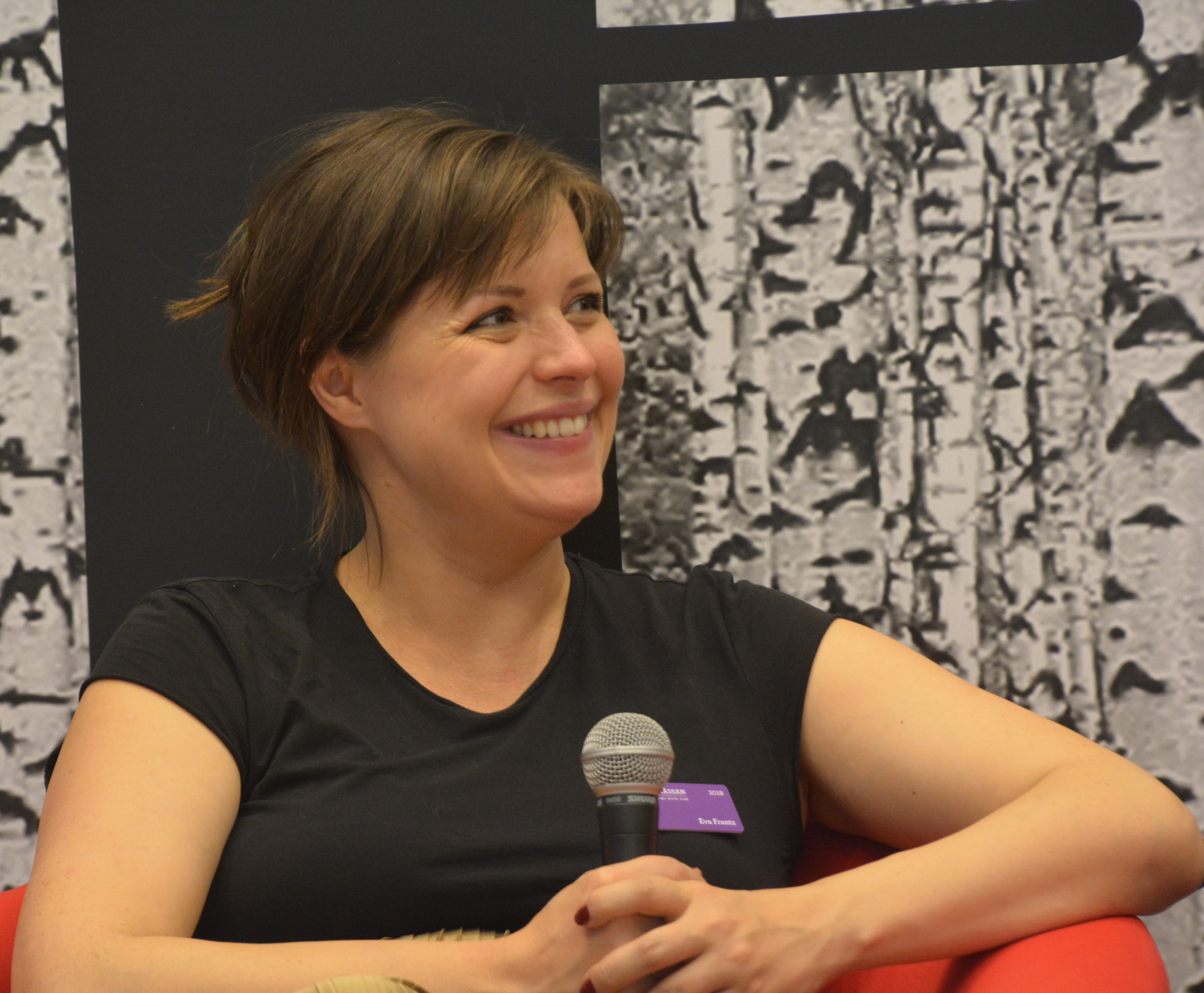
- Born: 5 November 1980 (age 45); Helsinki, Finland
- Occupations: Journalist; writer

Eva Frantz (born 5 November 1980) is a Swedish-speaking Finnish journalist and author.

== Biography ==
Frantz was born on 5 November 1980 in Helsinki and lived in the subdistrict of Kaarela during her childhood. She studied at the University of Helsinki's Svenska Social- och Kommunalhögskolan.

== Career ==
Frantz is a journalist for Yle Vega. She has worked at the channel as a journalist, presenter, music editor and online editor, among other things. She also hosts a podcast about human relationships called Norrena & Frantz with Vega's other editor Hannah Norrena. She has also been Svenska Yle's second Eurovision commentator and presenter of the Eurovision Song Contest program since 2012. Her partner in the Eurovision Song Contest is Johan Lindroos.

Frantz is also detective and children's writer. Her debut work, Sommarön, was published in 2016. Her later books include the Anna Glad detective stories, which have been published and translated in Estonia and Sweden, and children's books in Sweden, Britain, Denmark and Russia. Frantz's fourth work, Den åttonde tärnan, received the 2019 Vuoden johtolanka award. She is the first Finnish-Swedish author to receive the award. Her novel Hallonbacken has been adapted into a television series, which was released in December 2023.

== Personal life ==
Frantz is married with three children. They live in Espoo.

== Bibliography ==
- Sommarön: Roman. Helsinki: Schildts & Söderströms. 2016. ISBN 978-951-524-004-0
- Blå villan: Roman. Helsinki: Schildts & Söderströms. 2017. ISBN 978-951-524-329-4 - Anna Glad #1
- Den åttonde tärnan: Roman. Helsinki: Schildts & Söderströms. 2018. ISBN 978-951-52-4633-2 - Anna Glad #2
- Hallonbacken: Roman. Helsinki: Schildts & Söderströms. 2018. ISBN 978-951-52-459-53
- För han var redan dö. Helsingfors: Schildts & Söderströms. 2020. ISBN 978-951-52-5018-6. LIBRIS: 5g2v028s3sm0m5z1. - Anna Glad #3
- Nattens drottning. Schildts & Söderströms. 2021. ISBN 9789515252371
- Hemligheten i Helmersbruk co-written with Elin Sandström. Schildts & Söderströms. 2021. ISBN 9789515254191
- Ungen min får du aldrig. Helsingfors: Schildts & Söderströms. 2023. ISBN 978-951-52-5889-2. LIBRIS: 3k7vhh2g1zsss4vm. - Anna Glad #4
- Så dör du nöjdare. Schildts & Söderströms. 2024. ISBN 9789515260840. LIBRIS: 2kncfmrn0p8vqq6m. - Anna Glad #5
- Sköldpaddsön. Schildts & Söderströms. 2025. ISBN 9789515264572
