= Gambämark =

2018 musical by KAJ

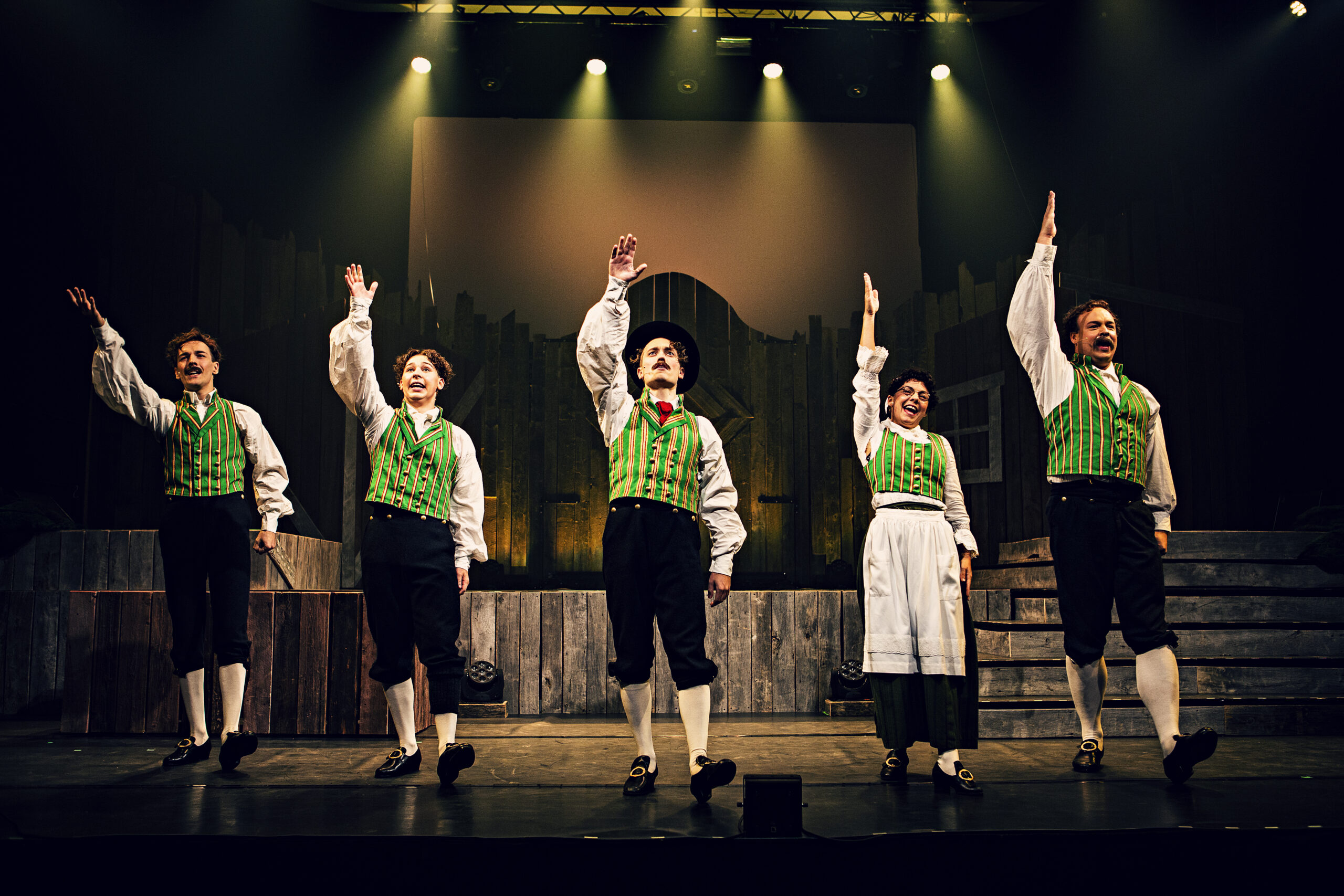
- Music: KAJ (group)
- Lyrics: KAJ (group)

Gambämark is a musical written and performed by the Finland-Swedish comedy group KAJ. It is set in the fictional Finnish village of Gambämark in Ostrobothnia, which declares independence from Finland and becomes its own sovereign state, operating on the principle "Things were better in the past". The story focuses on Josua Byman, the son of village leader Kurt Byman, who decides to rebel against his father and his ultra-conservative ideology. The musical opened at Wasa Teater in 2018, where it was played until 2019, with over 23,000 sold tickets, making it the fourth-biggest show in the history of the theatre, after Botnia Paradise, Colorado Avenue and The Sound of Music.

It was the first musical created by KAJ. Janne Hyöty served as music producer.

== Plot ==
=== Act 1 ===
The musical starts with a news report about the village of Gambämark declaring independence from Finland to form its own sovereign state based on the principle "Things were better in the past", with Russia, North Korea and Maxmo Cultural Heritage Association recognizing the newly-formed state. A wall is erected around the village, and nobody is allowed to enter or leave.

Fifteen years later, Gambämark has become an old-fashioned agrarian society largely based on communal work ("talko"), where public dances to folk music are common and people's diets consist largely of meat and potatoes ("Hitton litton"). The village leader, Kurt Byman, receives daily reports about the villagers' work ("För Gambämark") and introduces various regulations for the villagers, such as banning berry pickers and mandating vaccinations ("because we're not that stupid"). Josua, Kurt's son, has doubts about his father's plan economy policies, the ultra-conservative societal order which prohibits all change, and wonders exactly when the "past" people refer to when saying "Things were better in the past" was, since eventually, the present will become part of the past as well. Josua dreams of leaving the village to discover the world outside ("Dehär e min by"), and eventually meets Mäskis-Gunnar, a strange but kind man who offers him cookies from the outside world and promises to teach Josua about life.

Gambämark's isolation from the rest of the world has led to the moose population drastically sinking – while the villagers hunt moose all year, the walls of the village prohibit moose from the rest of Finland from migrating into Gambämark. This has led to the village only having one female moose, Gunilla, left, so the village guards Klas and Kenneth have been tasked with protecting her and keeping her alive so she can birth new moose for them to hunt and eat ("Gunilla"). A crisis occurs when Klas and Kenneth find a cookie wrapper (thrown away by Josua after being given a cookie by Mäskis-Gunnar), on the ground – in addition to being a forbidden object from the world outside, Gunilla could have died if she ate the plastic wrapper. Meanwhile, Mäskis-Gunnar explains his life philosophy to Josua, encouraging him to do what he feels like rather than what societal norms tells him to, and tells him that there's no shame in being weird ("Mäskis-Gunnar"). Josua is delighted to have met Mäskis-Gunnar, who'll teach him how to make moonshine and how to weld, as well as build a berry-picking machine together with him ("Jag har en vän"), but unbeknownst to him, Kurt has Mäskis-Gunnar arrested and exiled from the village for possession of cookies from the outside world and endangering Gunilla's life with the thrown-away wrapper ("Ut ur byggden").

When Josua hears about Mäskis-Gunnar being banished from the village, he is devastated, considering it to be his fault since he was the one who threw the wrapper on the ground. Josua tells Kurt that Mäskis-Gunnar was his friend, which only makes Kurt further convinced that banishing him was the right thing to do, since Mäskis-Gunnar would have been a bad influence on him. Kurt taunts Josua about being "weak" and promises to make him join the moose hunting party to "make him into a real man". Some other villagers decide to offer Josua words of encouragement, boiling down to "Tough it out and smile even when things are at their worst" ("E jöutas ti lev"), but this only makes Josua more depressed. He's found by Berit, the leader of the local sewing circle, who brings him to meet the other members of the circle. Once there, he vents his frustrations with his father's authoritarian rule and ultra-conservatism, and Berit reveals that the sewing circle is actually a military junta (Note: This is a pun – in Swedish, sewing circles are referred to as "syjuntor", "sewing juntas") who plan to overthrow Kurt and seize power in Gambämark, and Josua happily joins them ("Juntton").

=== Act 2 ===
Josua uses Mäskis-Gunnar's berry-picking machine to pick all of Gambämark's blueberries and lingonberries, distributing them more fairly between the villagers than Kurt's regime does ("Bäriking"), starting to turn the villagers against Kurt. However, Josua soon finds himself frustrated with the rest of the junta – while Josua wants to take direct action against Kurt by attacking the freezer where Kurt keeps the berry reserves, the women in the junta want to use more passive methods, which Josua consider ridiculous and insufficient ("Tä va he tå"). The junta uses a walkie-talkie Kurt previously left behind during a conversation with Berit to eavesdrop on Kurt's communication with Klas and Kenneth, and decides to take action by moving Gunilla's salt block to the forest area where Klas and Kenneth are posted on guard duty. Josua initially objects, once again finding it ridiculous and insufficient, but it turns out to have an effect: After Klas and Kenneth declare their love for each other ("Tå vi e på pass") during their shift, Gunilla comes wandering through the woods to lick the salt block. As she does so, Klas accidentally discharges his rifle, and the bullet hits Gunilla and kills her immediately.

Kurt is furious with Klas and Kenneth after Gunilla's death, but realizes that since the salt block had been moved to where Klas and Kenneth were posted, someone must have been eavesdropping on their communication to know that they'd be there. He sets a trap by giving Klas and Kenneth false orders to leave the berry freezer unguarded since he needs them to attend "an important meeting that might take the whole night". Josua, frustrated with the junta's inaction, decides to depart on a sabotage mission on his own. Upon finding out about this, Berit figures out that it's a trap set by Kurt and sets off to find Josua and warn him. As she catches up with him at the freezer, they're ambushed by Kurt, Klas and Kenneth, who arrest Berit, but Josua manages to escape.

Kurt decides that Berit will be banished from the village, but in the meantime, she's made to sort berries. Following this, Kurt reinforces his iron grip on the village, deciding to turn the villagers' communal work into slave labor that will make him rich ("Talkokraft"). Kurt also forbids Klas and Kenneth from being on guard duty together, which makes Klas start to doubt Kurt, trying to convince Kenneth to stop following Kurt's orders so they can be together. Kenneth is initially hesitant, but eventually decides that his love for Klas is greater than his fear of Kurt's wrath, deciding to stay by his side.

When the time for Berit's banishment from the village comes, it turns out that Josua has replaced Kurt's law book with his own diary, and shortly afterward, he arrives, carrying the real law book with him. He confronts his father, explaining that Kurt has violated the most basic laws of the village with his tyrannical actions and selfishness, and that "[Josua] could keep reading the laws of the village the whole day, and [Kurt] would be found guilty of breaking every single one". Josua uses this to depose his father and seize control of Gambämark himself, commanding Klas and Kenneth to arrest Kurt and make him sort berries. This makes Kurt reflect on his behavior and realize that he's been a terrible leader and "an asshole who only ruins things" ("Ässol"). As Klas and Kenneth are about to take Kurt away, Berit interjects and tells Josua that he's treating Kurt the way that Kurt treated the other villagers, and that it's time for change – otherwise, Josua will just reinforce the corrupt social structures and keep the cycle of oppression going.

Josua agrees, deciding to forgive his father, and holds a speech in which he says that the villagers shouldn't fear the unknown, and that there is no shame in being "weird", and that everyone should dare to be a bit weird. He decides that it's time to tear the walls of Gambämark down, but concedes that things were better in the past – "before we started thinking everything was better in the past".

After finishing his speech, Josua decides to hold a referendum and let the citizens of Gambämark vote on whether they should tear the walls down or not, but he's interrupted mid-sentence by Mäskis-Gunnar breaking the village gate down with a chainsaw. Mäskis-Gunnar explains that he's travelled around the world during his time in exile, realizing that everyone's just as weird as him, and suggests that the villagers "shut up and dance Mäskis-Gunnar's boogie-woogie" ("Hald käftan (no dansar vi)"). The musical ends with the villagers agreeing to Mäskis-Gunnar's suggestion, happily dancing together, eager to embrace their differences and stop fearing the unknown.

== Cast ==
- Jakob Norrgård – Josua Byman, Gambämark citizen
- Axel Åhman – Kurt Byman, old woman, Gambämark citizen, dancing rodent
- Kevin Holmström – Mäskis-Gunnar, Kenneth, Gambämark citizen, dancing girl, Gita
- Susanne Marins – Berit, dancing rodent
- Jonas Bergqvist – Klas, Margita, scam victim, Gambämark citizen

== Reception ==
The musical received a positive review in Hufvudstadsbladet. The Wasa Theater described it as a success, with attendees of Gambämark making up almost half of their overall audience for the year.
