= Kristofer Strandberg =

Swedish songwriter and record producer (born 1988)

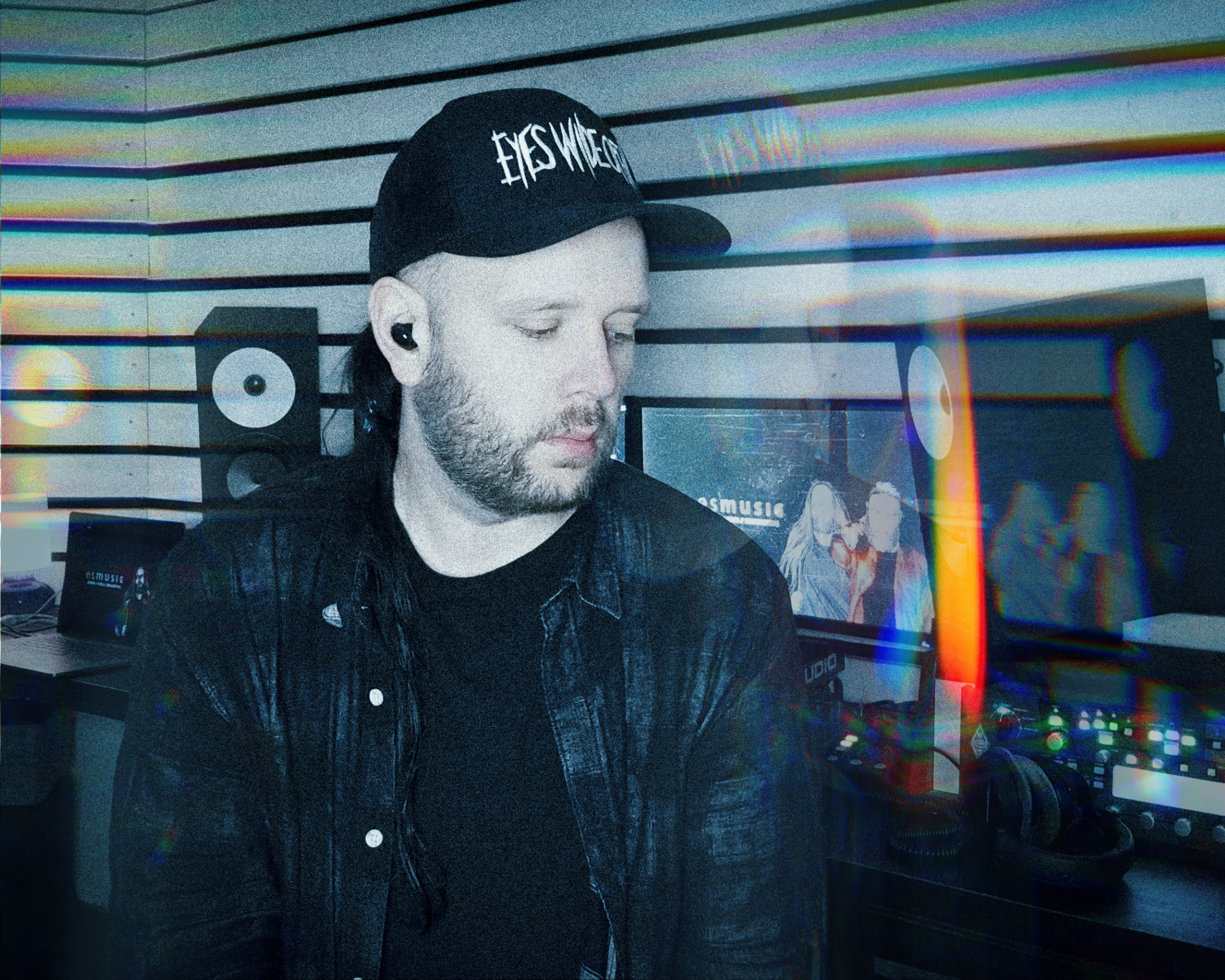
- Strandberg in his studio

Background information
- Born: Ulf Kristofer Strandberg; 27 June 1988 (age 37); Skåre, Värmland County, Sweden
- Occupations: Songwriter; record producer
- Years active: 2021–present

Ulf Kristofer Strandberg (born 27 June 1988) is a Swedish songwriter and record producer.

== Biography ==
Strandberg participated at Melodifestivalen 2025 as one of six songwriters for the winning song "Bara bada bastu" performed by Swedish-speaking Finnish group KAJ. Later that year, he co-wrote "Back To Forgetting" for Austrian singer JJ, who had previously won Eurovision 2025 with "Wasted Love".

== Discography ==
=== Singles ===
- 2021 – Ludens (ES Music).
- 2021 – F.O.D. (ES Music).
- 2022 – Stay (ES Music).
- 2022 – StTraNgeRs (ES Music).
- 2022 – My Secret Twin (ES Music).
- 2023 – Space & Radio (Castro Music). Together with Jim Castro.
- 2024 – Hollywood heartbreak (ES Music).
