= Vörå runes =

Rock carvings found in Ostrobothnia, Finland

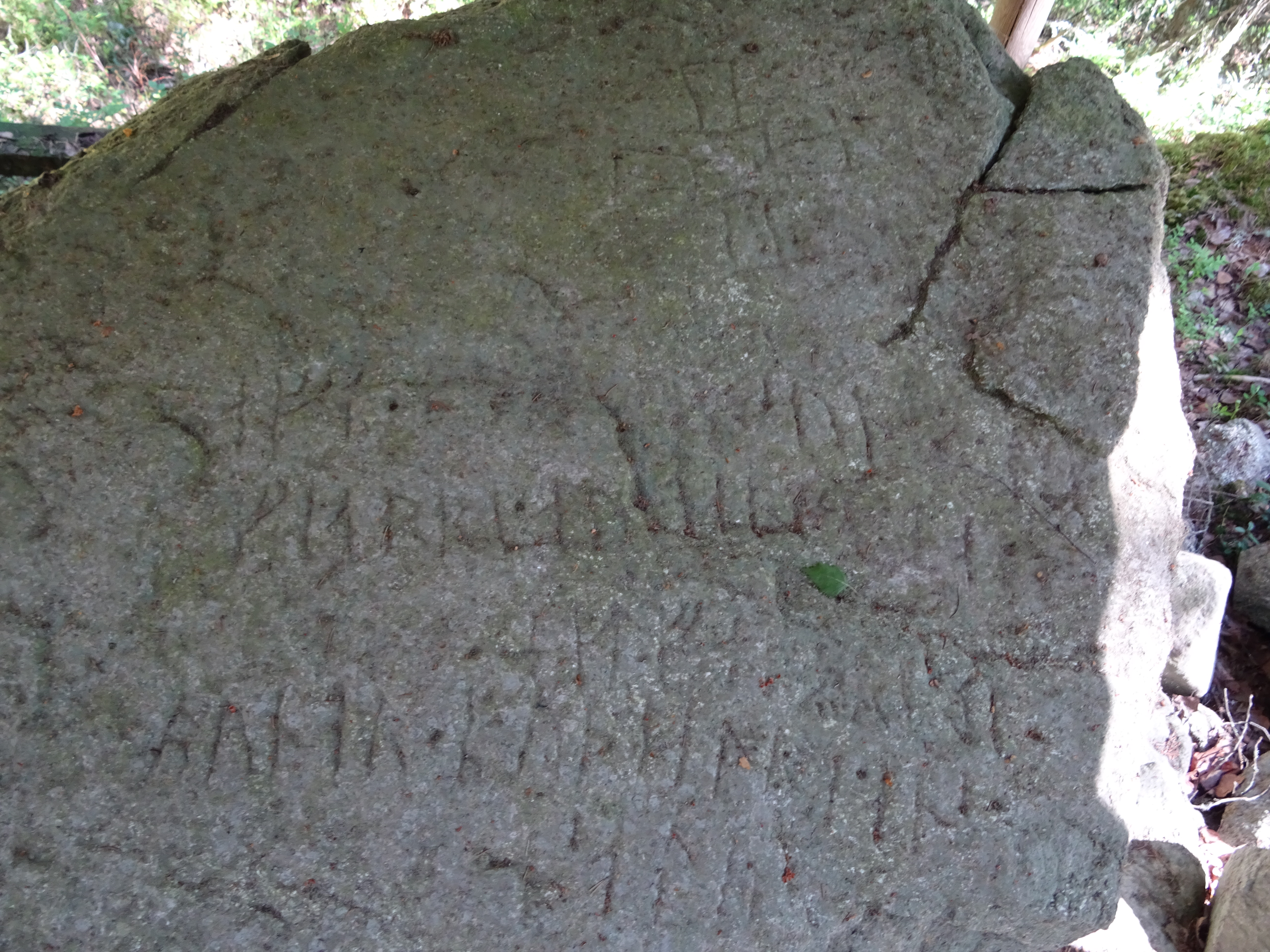
A runestone of Båtholmen

The Vörå runes (Swedish: Vörårunorna, Finnish: Vöyrin riimukirjoitukset) were found in the municipality of Vörå, Finland, between 1978 and 1982. They are rock carvings, found in two separate locations, in an area of marsh and forest area of approximately 7–9 km from the municipal centre of Vörå. The engravings include a cross and a picture of the ship. In the 1980s the National Board of Antiquities estimated that they are not from the Viking Age, but are likely to be fakes, and no more than 100–200 years old, as the Vörå engravings shape differ from the typical runes.
