= Vörå =

Vörå Vörå – Vöyri
- Municipality
- Vörå kommun Vöyrin kunta
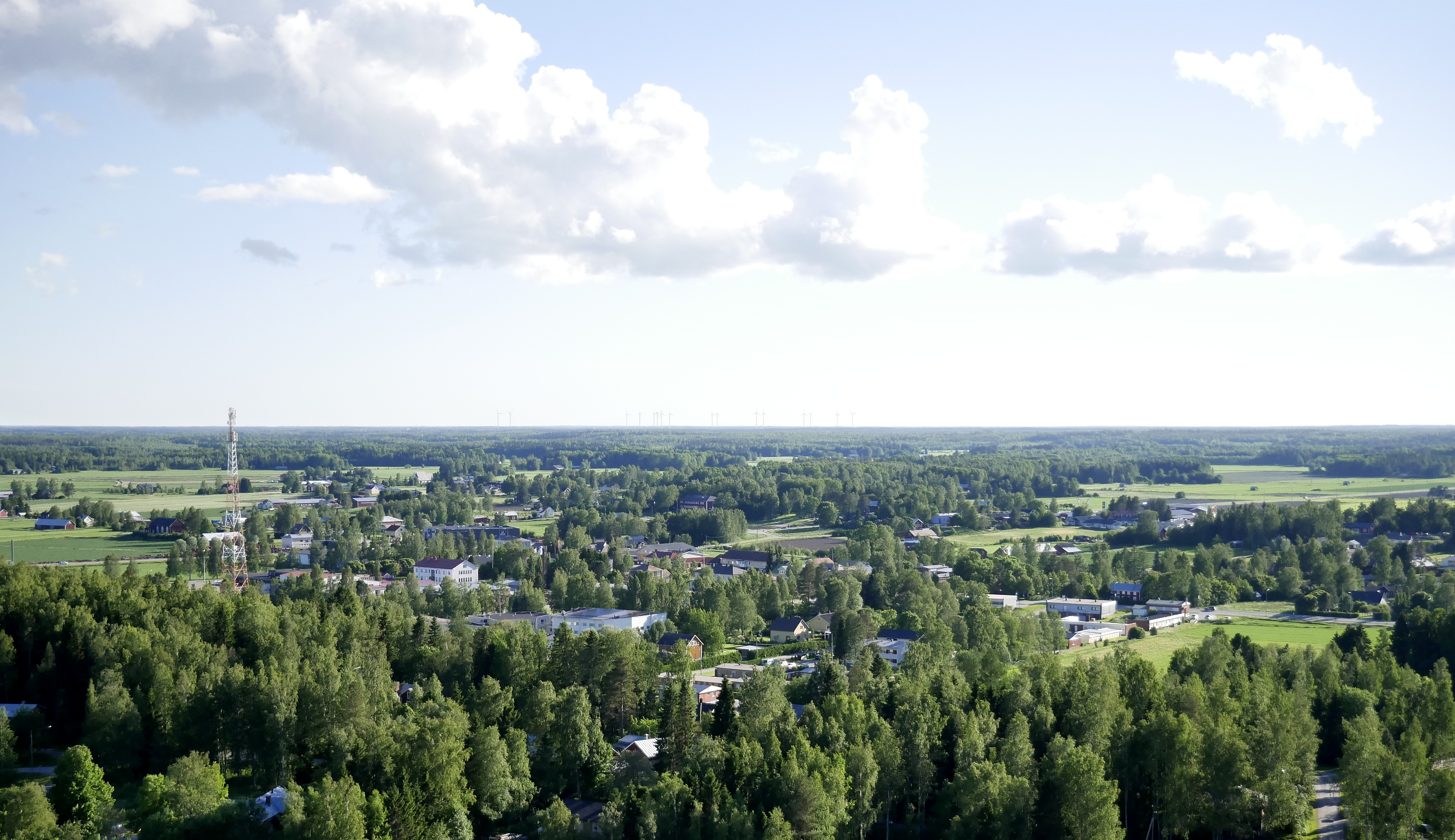
- Vörå as seen from a ski jumping tower

- Coat of arms

- Location of Vörå in Finland
- Interactive map of Vörå
- Coordinates: 63°08′N 022°15′E
- Country: Finland
- Region: Ostrobothnia
- Sub-region: Vaasa
- Founded (parish): 1516
- Charter: 1868 (Vörå)
- Re-established: 2007 (Vörå-Maxmo)
- Re-established: 2011 (Vörå)

Government
  - Municipal manager: Jan Finne

Area (2018-01-01)
  - Total: 1,499.91 km^{2} (579.12 sq mi)
  - Land: 782.13 km^{2} (301.98 sq mi)
  - Water: 718.6 km^{2} (277.5 sq mi)
  - Rank: 107th largest in Finland

Population (2025-12-31)
  - Total: 6,185
  - Rank: 149th largest in Finland
  - Density: 7.91/km^{2} (20.5/sq mi)

Population by native language
  - Swedish: 81.3% (official)
  - Finnish: 11.7% (official)
  - Others: 7%
- Time zone: UTC+02:00 (EET)
  - Summer (DST): UTC+03:00 (EEST)
- Website: www.vora.fi/en/

Vörå (Finland Swedish: [ˈvœːro]; Finnish: Vöyri; Finnish: [ˈʋøy̯ri]) is a municipality in Finland, located on the west coast of the country. Vörå is situated in Ostrobothnia, along the Gulf of Bothnia, about 30 kilometres (19 mi) east of Vaasa and about 90 kilometres (56 mi) southwest of Kokkola. The population of Vörå is approximately 6,000, while the sub-region has a population of approximately 112,000. It is the 149th most populous municipality in Finland.

Vörå is a bilingual municipality with Swedish and Finnish as its official languages. The population consists of 12% Finnish speakers, 81% Swedish speakers, and 7% speakers of other languages.

== Etymology ==
The name Vörå was first mentioned in documents in 1367 and the parish of Vörå was first mentioned in 1443. The parish name has been the subject of both historical and toponymy research since at least 1734. It has been debated whether the name is originally Swedish Vörå or Finnish Vöyri and what the basis for the name was. The parish of Vörå is located on a historical language border. Its village names and many family names are undoubtedly of Finnish origin. It is estimated that the population only became Swedish during the 16th century. Therefore, it is reasonable to assume that the parish name itself is of Finnish origin. Lars Huldén believed that the original name is Finnish and one-part, possibly derived from the word vieru. Its diphthong reverts to a long e and is seen in the old spelling Weru. Huldén believed that the factual basis for the name was its topography: an edge, a cliff, or a place from which the earth has rolled away.

== History ==
The first church in Vörå was built in the Middle Ages. The church was built on the hill in the early 16th century, and the current church was completed in 1627.

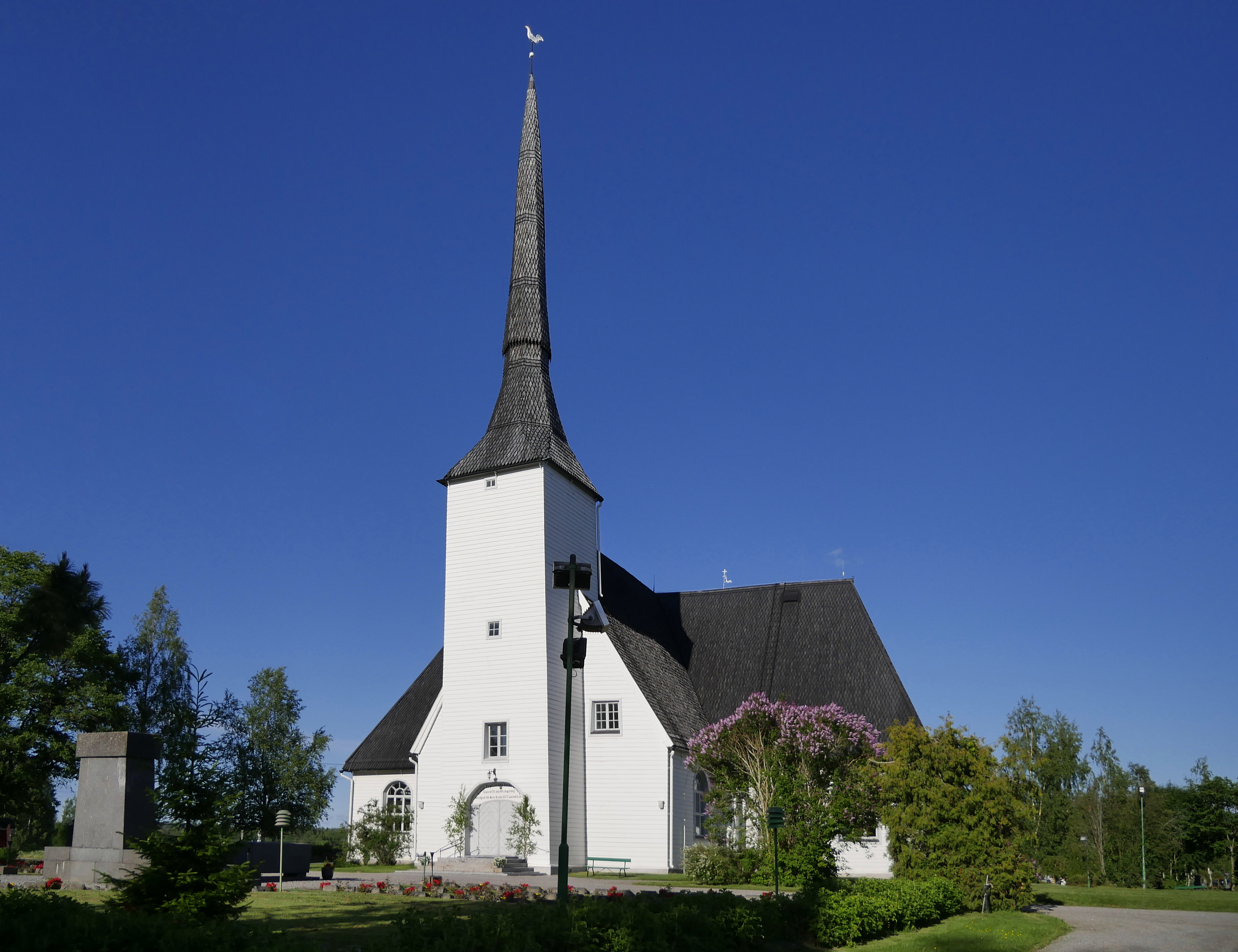
Vörå Church

The oldest livelihoods of the people of Vörå were agriculture, fishing and sailing. In the 18th century, tar making also became common. Agriculture developed considerably in the 19th century, when the municipality began to industrialize.

The Battle of Oravais during the Finnish War (1808–1809) took place in Vörå on 14 September 1808.

The former municipality called Old Vörå had a population of 3,524 (2003) and covered an area of 427.50 square kilometres (165.06 sq mi) of which 2.38 square kilometres (0.92 sq mi) is water. The population density was 8.3 inhabitants per km^{2}. The majority were speakers of Swedish (85%) and the minority speakers of Finnish (14%). In 2011, Vörå was formed by merging the municipalities of Vörå-Maxmo and Oravais. Vörå-Maxmo, in turn, was established in 2007 by merging the municipalities of (old) Vörå and Maxmo.

== Economy ==
As an economic region, Vörå belongs to the Vaasa sub-region, whose regional gross domestic product per capita was €47,978 in 2022. The regional GDP is higher than the national average and the 11th largest among the regions.

As of 2014, primary industries in Vörå employ "15.5 per cent of the population, 32.9 per cent of people work in the industrial sector, and 50.3 per cent of people work in the service sector."

== Education ==
Vörå idrottsgymnasium, a Swedish-language sports high school, operates at the Campus Norrvalla camp center in Vörå.

== Culture ==
Vörå has its own Swedish dialect, which is part of the Ostrobothnian Swedish dialects.

In the 1980s, a clot soup called vöråsoppan was named the traditional dish of Vörå.

Vörå is the hometown of the comedy trio KAJ, which consists of Kevin Holmström, Axel Åhman, and Jakob Norrgård. The group represented Sweden in the Eurovision Song Contest 2025 after winning Melodifestivalen 2025 with their song "Bara bada bastu".

== Notable people ==
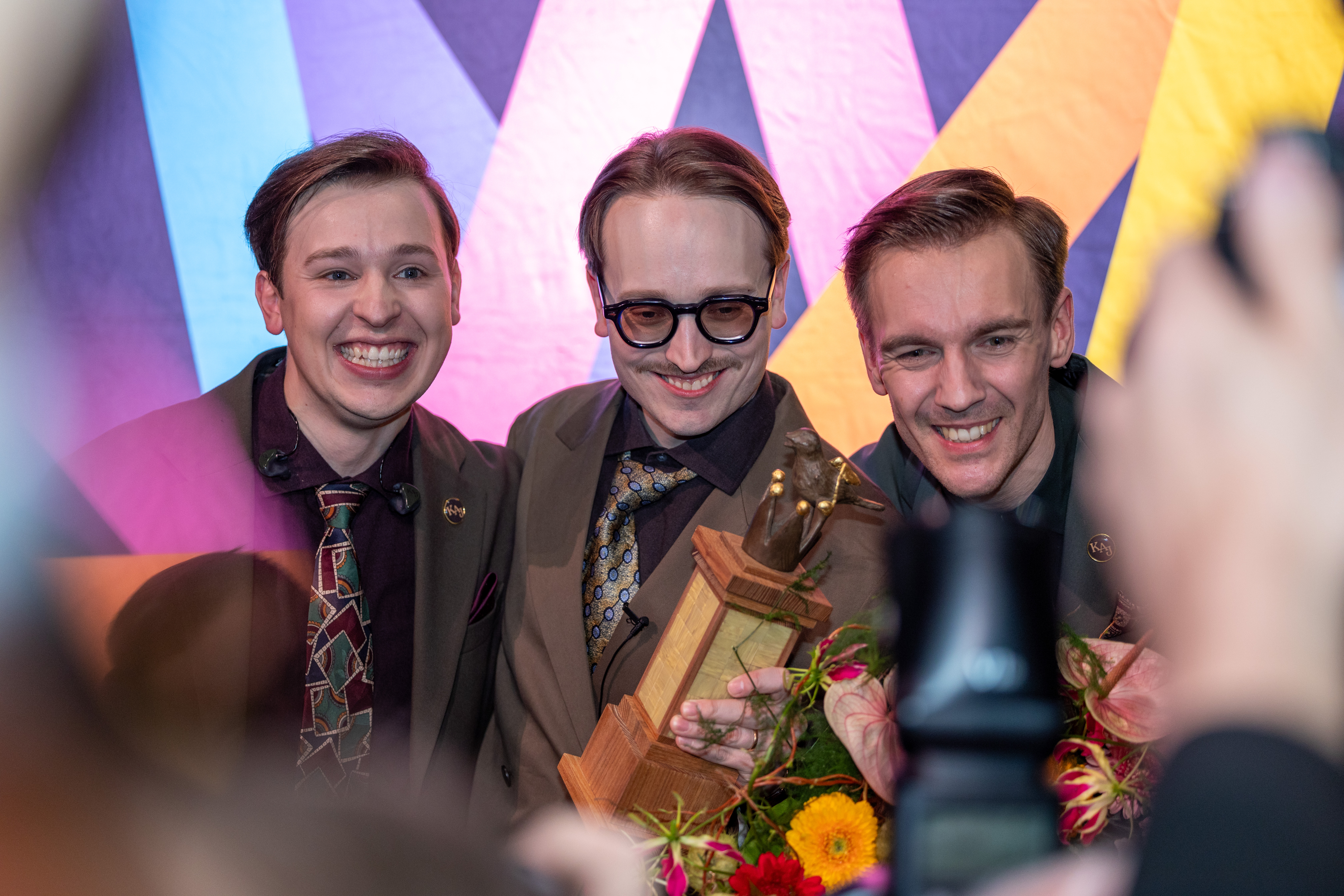
KAJ, a music group from Vörå

- Immanuel Bäck (1876–1939), Lutheran clergyman and politician
- Johannes Bäck (1872–1952), Lutheran clergyman and politician
- Adolf Engström (1855–1924), engineer and businessman
- Edvard Haga (1893–1968), farmer, bank director and politician
- KAJ (Kevin Holmström, Axel Åhman, and Jakob Norrgård; born 1993), music and comedy group
- Johannes Miemois (1866–1924), farmer and politician
- Tim Sparv (born 1987), football coach and a former professional footballer
- David Söderberg (born 1979), hammer thrower

== See also ==
- Finnish national road 8 (E8) – a highway passing through Vörå
- Maxmo – a former municipality, today part of Vörå
- Oravais – a former municipality, today part of Vörå
- Vörå runes – local rock carvings
