= Johannes Miemois =

Finnish farmer and politician (1866–1924)

Johan (Johannes) Miemois (12 July 1866 – 1 September 1924) was a Finnish farmer and politician, born in Vörå. He was a member of the Parliament of Finland from 1914 to 1916 and from 1919 to 1924, representing the Swedish People's Party of Finland.
