= Oravais =

Oravais Oravais – Oravainen
- Former municipality
- Oravais kommun Oravaisten kunta
- Coat of arms

- Location of Oravais in Finland
- Coordinates: 63°18′N 022°22.5′E
- Country: Finland
- Region: Ostrobothnia
- Sub-region: Vaasa sub-region
- Established: 1859
- Consolidated: 2011

Government
  - Municipal manager: Markku Niskala

Area
  - Total: 277.09 km^{2} (106.99 sq mi)
  - Land: 203.98 km^{2} (78.76 sq mi)
  - Water: 73.11 km^{2} (28.23 sq mi)

Population (2010-10-31)
  - Total: 2,189
  - Density: 10.73/km^{2} (27.79/sq mi)

Population by native language
  - Finnish: 10.3% (official)
  - Swedish: 80.9% (official)
  - Others: 8.8%

Population by age
  - 0 to 14: 15.4%
  - 15 to 64: 62.2%
  - 65 or older: 22.3%
- Time zone: UTC+2 (EET)
  - Summer (DST): UTC+3 (EEST)
- Postal code: 66800

Oravais (Finnish: Oravainen) is a former municipality of Finland. It is located in the province of Western Finland and is part of the Ostrobothnia region. The municipality had a population of 2,189 (31 October 2010) and covered a land area of 203.98 square kilometres (78.76 sq mi). The population density was 10.73 inhabitants per square kilometre (27.8/sq mi). The municipality was consolidated with Vörå-Maxmo to form the new municipality of Vörå on 1 January 2011.

The municipality was officially bilingual, with the majority speaking Swedish (81%) and the minority Finnish (10%). Most of the remaining 9% live in Oravais Reception Centre for Refugees, and speak several other languages.

== Trade and industry ==
Farming forestry and fur farming employs 18.8% of the population, industry etc. 33.4%, the service sector 46.8% and unclassified sectors 1%. Traditionally, Oravais has been dominated by farming, with notable elements of industry. The structural transformation of farming has been considerable; today 118 farmers and about 40 fur farmers are still active.

Among the larger employers we find companies working with construction, manufacturing of sandpaper, packing and equipment. There are many small businesses. The location at a main road has furthered restaurant enterprise. Tourism has been enhanced since the 1990s.

== History ==
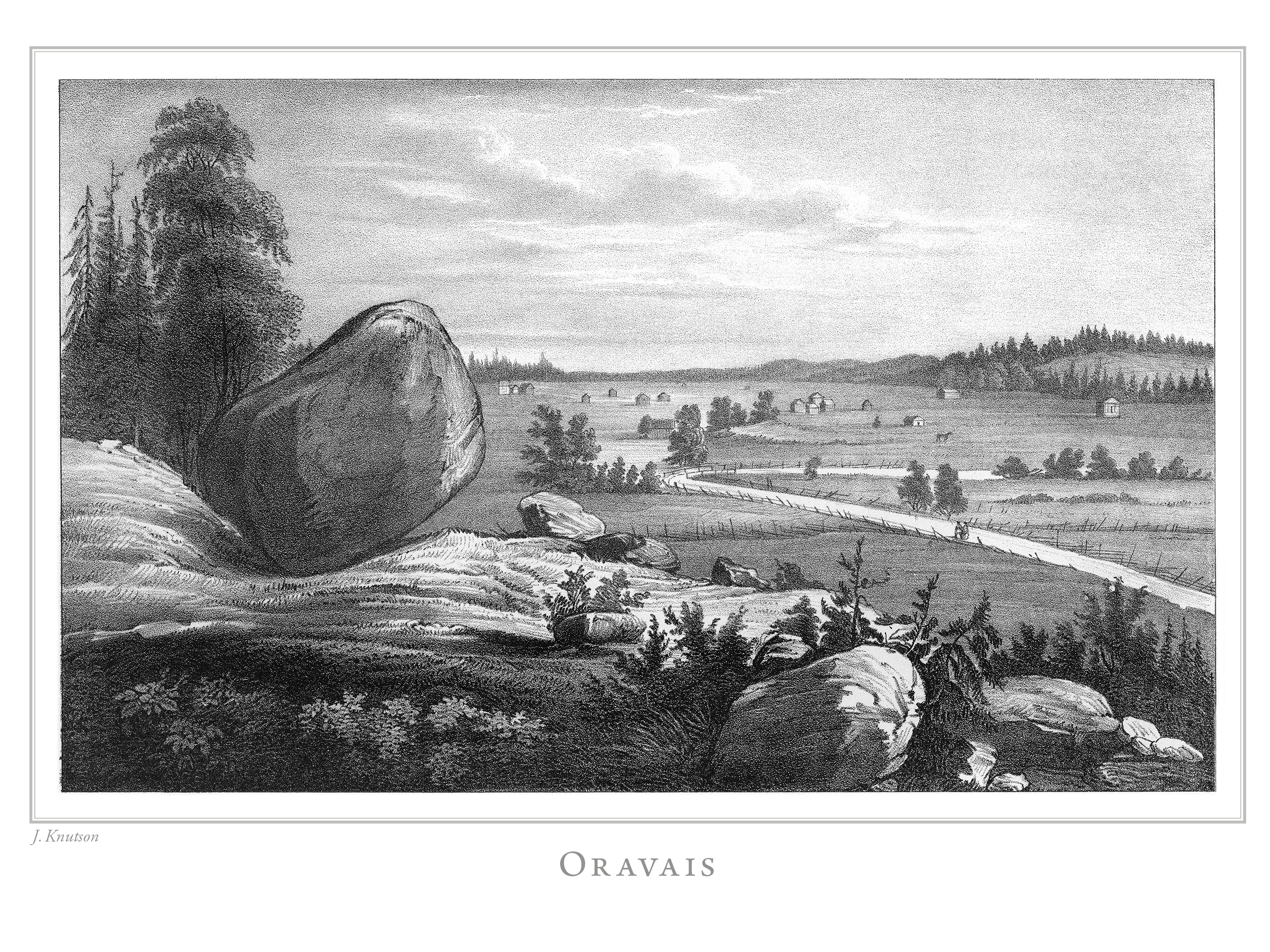
Illustration of Oravais in Finland framstäldt i teckningar edited by Zacharias Topelius and published 1845-1852.

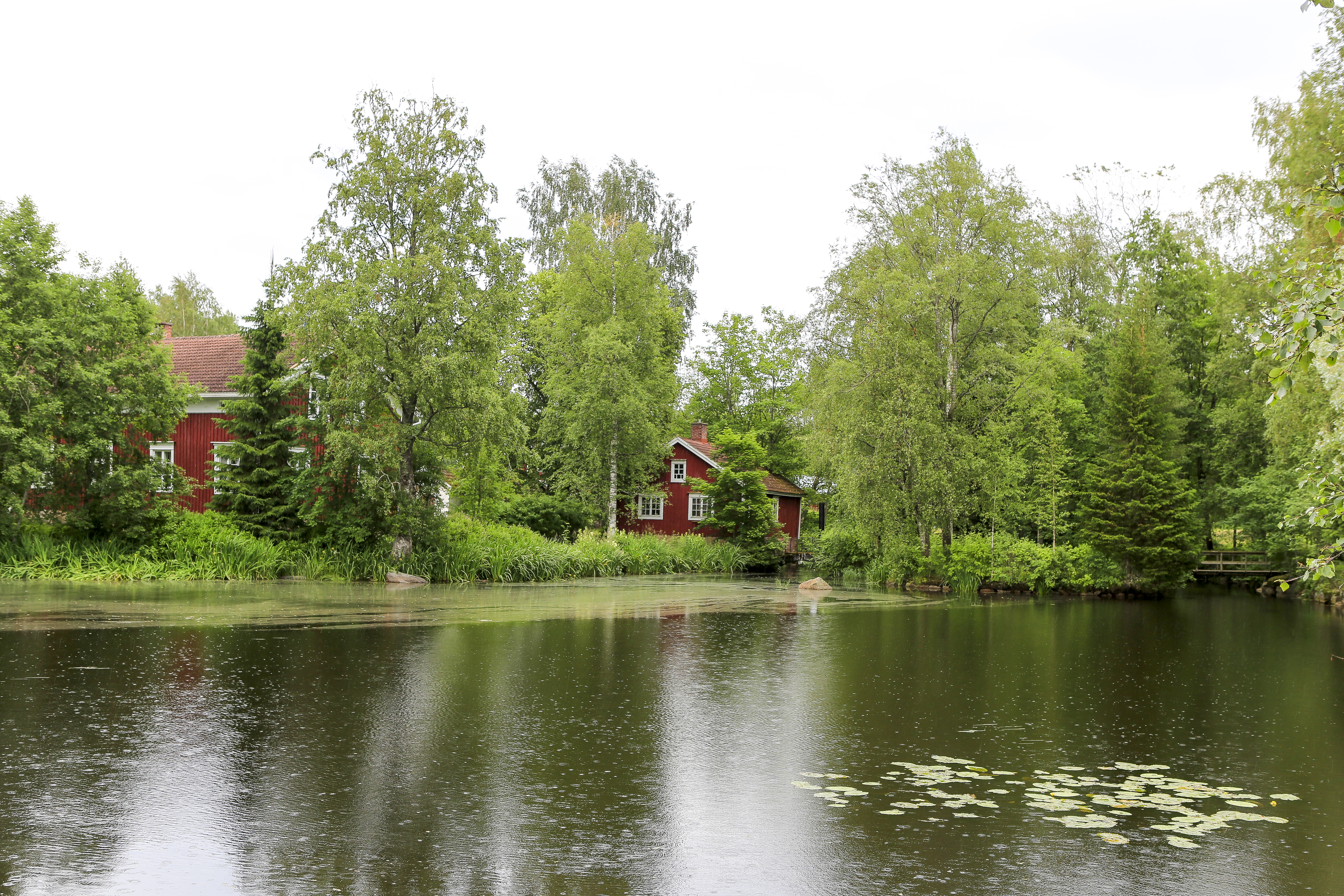
The old pond of Kimo Ironworks.

Oravais was detached from Vörå as a semiautonomous chapel of ease in 1676 and became an independent parish in 1859.

The Battle of Oravais was a critical event during the Finnish War 1808–09 between Russia and Sweden, and took place on September 14, 1808. The Russian troops won the battle, which became the turning point in the war. After the defeat of Sweden in the war, Finland became a Grand Duchy under Russia.

In the village Kimo (pronounced [ˈɕɪ̌mːʊ], Finland Swedish: [ˈtɕimu]) the ironworks Kimo bruk, (Kimo works) was founded in 1703 by the Stockholm businessman Petter Heijke, who already ran Orisberg works in the neighbouring municipality Storkyro. Several helve hammers were built at the works; they were actuated by water power from the Kimo river. The ruins of the forge, which was built at the works in 1791, still remain. The enterprise came to an end in the 1860s; after that water mills were set up in the building. The mill was closed in 1979. Since 1986, the old mill is the scene for an outdoor theater every summer. Historical plays, written by playwrights with local association, are often performed.

The iron ore was shipped to Oravais and worked up at Oravais blast furnace before it was transported to Kimo works. In the same place, Oravais factory was established after the ironworks era was over; for many years it was an important textile industry. The factory contributed to the character of Oravais by giving the municipality some mobility of inhabitants and a presence of casual labourers – otherwise an alien phenomenon on the Finnish countryside – and the corollary occurrence of socialist ideas. The vast majority of the inhabitants, however, were farmers until modernity progressed in the 20th century.

== Famous people from Oravais ==
- Kevin Holmström, member of the music and comedy group KAJ
- Tim Sparv, football player

== See also ==
- Battle of Oravais – The bloodiest battle in the Finnish War, 1808–1809.
