= Edvard Haga =

Finnish politician

Edvard Haga (19 October 1893, Vörå - 21 January 1968) was a Finnish farmer, bank director and politician. He was a member of the Parliament of Finland from 1929 to 1944, representing the Swedish People's Party of Finland.
