= Ronny Larsson =

Swedish journalist

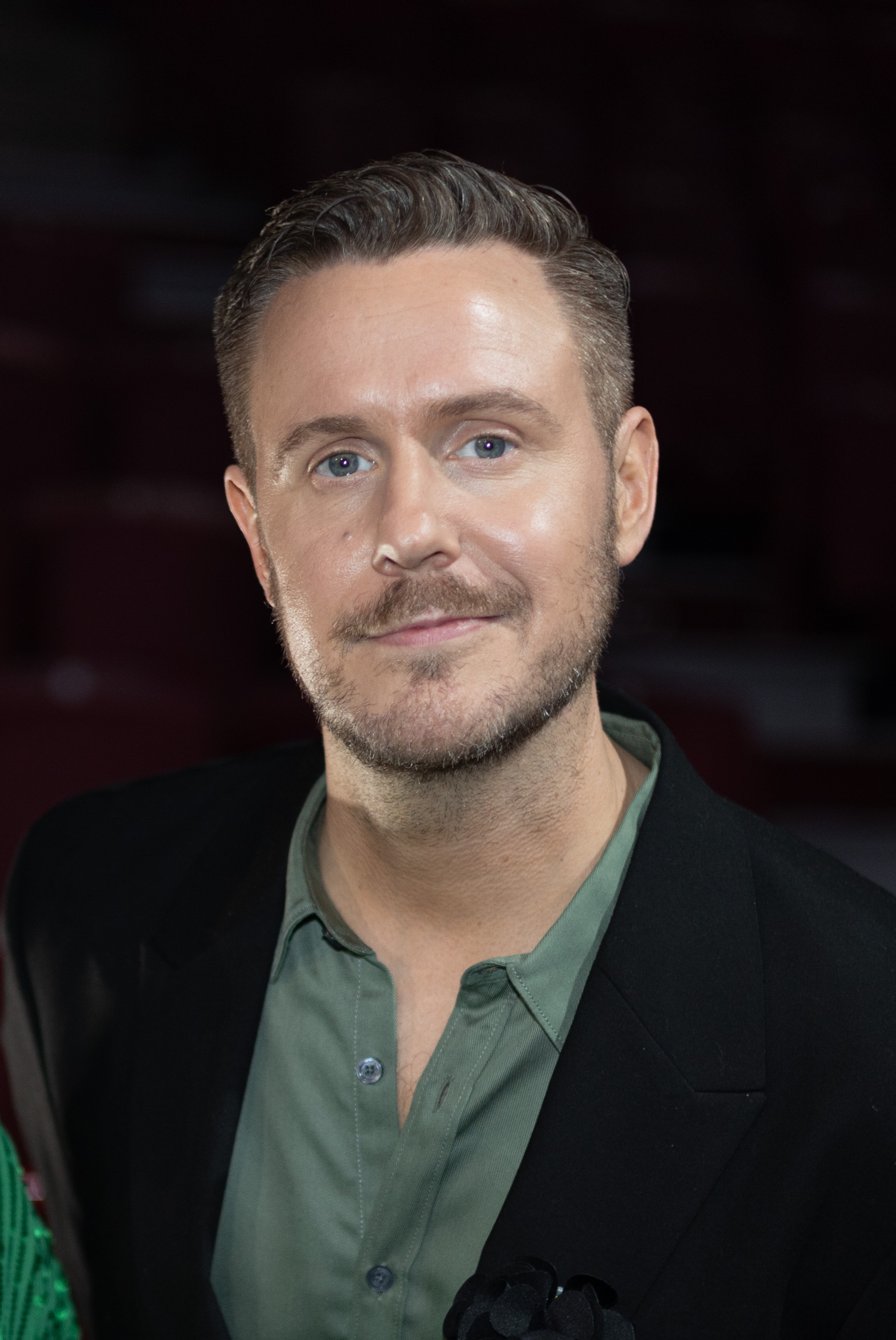
- Born: 9 February 1976; Spånga-Kista församling

Ronny Erik Larsson (born 9 February 1976) is a Swedish journalist and editor-in-chief.

Larsson was born in Spånga Parish, Stockholm County, Sweden. He studied journalism at Södertörn University and began working as a journalist for QX in 2004, Sweden's largest LGBTQ+ magazine and one of the country's biggest free publications. In 2015, he took on the role of editor-in-chief for QX Förlag, alongside Anders Öhrman.

Larsson's interest for schlager music led to his role as a jury member for Melodifestivalen 2017. Since 2007, he has been part of the duo Schlagerprofilerna, reporting on Melodifestivalen and Eurovision Song Contest for QX.
