= Svenska Yle =

Logo of Yle

Svenska Yle (English: Swedish Yle) is the Swedish-language department of Yle, Finland's public service broadcaster for TV, radio and the web. As Finland is constitutionally bilingual—around 5.5% of the population speaks Swedish as their native language—Yle provides radio and TV programming in Swedish. Svenska Yle consists of svenska.yle.fi, Yle X3M, Yle Vega, and Yle Fem.

Svenska.yle.fi is Finland's largest Swedish-language media site, which in February 2014 was visited by an average of 199,000 unique browsers per week. The web content includes five regional websites, in Ostrobothnia, Western Uusimaa, Åboland, the Capital Region and Eastern Uusimaa.

Swedish TV programs are shown on Yle Fem, which shares a channel with Finnish speaking Yle Teema. The channel was originally launched as FST (Finlands svenska television, English: Finlands Swedish Television) in 2001.

The radio channel Yle Vega is aimed at an adult audience, and Yle X3M is aimed at Finland Swede youth and young adults.
