= Lotta Furebäck =

Swedish dancer, choreographer and director

- Born: Ann-Charlotte Elisabeth Furebäck; 6 March 1967 (age 59); Norrköping, Sweden
- Citizenship: Sweden
- Occupations: Dancer; choreographer; director
- Spouse: Chris Lindh
- Children: 2

Ann-Charlotte Elisabeth Furebäck (born 6 March 1967) is a Swedish dancer, choreographer and director.

== Biography ==
Lotta Furebäck started dancing at the age of 3 and attended dance high school. As a young woman, she was the Swedish junior champion in Latin American dance. She has danced in the group BouncE and in over 600 Joe Labero shows. She has also danced behind many great artists, such as Carola Häggkvist.

On TV, Furebäck has been seen in Fame Factory and Floor Filler. She has also worked for years in Italian TV. In 2021, she became Sweden's head of delegation at the Eurovision Song Contest.

Furebäck lives on Ekerö with her fiancé Chris Lindh, a former singer in Barbados. The couple have two daughters.
