= Yle X3M =

Swedish-language Finnish radio station

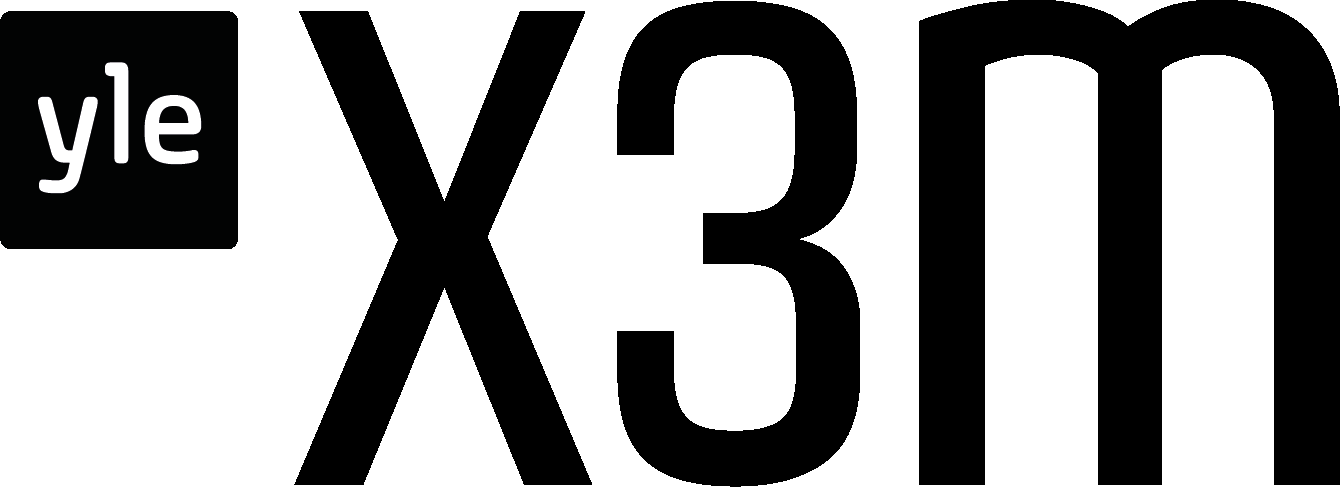

Programming
- Language: Swedish

Ownership
- Owner: Yle
- Sister stations: YleX

History
- First air date: 1 October 1997

Links
- Webcast: svenska.yle.fi/x3m/radio/
- Website: svenska.yle.fi/x3m/

Yle X3M (Extrem, Finland Swedish pronunciation: [eksˈtreːm]) is a Finnish Swedish-language radio station, owned and operated by Yle. Established in 1997, it is generally aimed at the youth audience broadcasting news, current affairs, entertainment and popular music. The station primarily plays English-language international popular music. It complements Yle's other Swedish-language radio service, Yle Vega, which focuses on mature audiences.

As of 2012, Yle X3M had a technical reach of 48% of Finns older than 9 years old. The daily reach of it and Yle Vega together was 3% of the population over age 9 in 2010, making them together the 10th largest radio "channel" in Finland at the time.

In 1998, X3M became one of the first Finnish radio stations with an online broadcast. In the 2010s, X3M's internet community was one of the largest Swedish internet communities in Finland.

The station was considered for closure in 2007 as Yle sought savings in order to adjust to lowering income from television licences, but the station was spared from closure following public support.
