= Jennie Widegren =

Swedish dancer and choreographer

Jennie Widegren is a choreographer, and one of the members of the Bounce Streetdance Company.

Widegren has choreographed for So You Think You Can Dance - Scandinavia. She also choreographed the opening segment of the second semifinal of the Eurovision Song Contest 2013 on May 14.
