= Maxmo =

Former municipality of Finland

Coordinates: 63°12′50″N 22°03′35″E

Coat of Arms of Maxmo

Maxmo (Finnish: Maksamaa) is a former municipality of Finland. It was located in the province of Western Finland and was part of the Ostrobothnia region. The municipality was consolidated with Vörå to form the new municipality of Vörå-Maxmo in 2007.

The former municipality had a population of 1,037 (2003) and covered an area of 148.06 km² of which one fourth was land. The population density was 7.0 inhabitants per km². The majority were speakers of Swedish (90%) and the minority speakers of Finnish (8%).

Maxmo was part of the Kvarken Archipelago. The Kvarken Archipelago is continuously rising from the sea at a rate among the highest in the world. During the last 600 years, over a third of the land areas in Maxmo has risen from the sea. That means over 20 acres (81,000 m^{2}) of new land every year.

In July 2006 Kvarken Archipelago was added as an extension to the UNESCO World Heritage Site of The High Coast. The archipelago is unique in that it features ridged washboard moraines known as De Geer moraines, formed by the melting of the continental ice sheet 10,000 to 24,000 years ago.
