= Yle Vega =

Swedish-language Finnish radio station

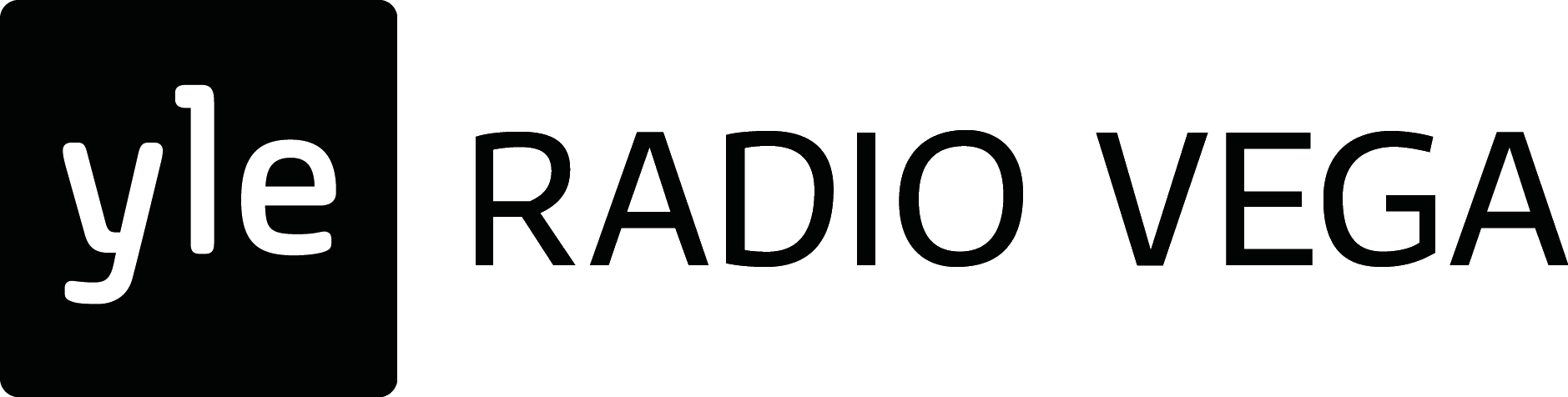

Programming
- Language: Swedish
- Format: Full service

Ownership
- Owner: Yleisradio

History
- First air date: 1 October 1997
- Former names: Riksradion (1961–1997); Yle Radio Vega (1997–2016)

Links
- Website: Yle Vega

Yle Vega (prior to 1 September 2016 – Yle Radio Vega) is a Finnish radio channel broadcasting in the Swedish language. It is operated by Finland's national public service broadcaster Yle, and broadcast news, current affairs, culture and music targeting mature audiences, complements Yle's other Swedish-speaking service, Yle X3M, which targets youth-audiences. It was launched in 1997, replacing Yle's previous full-network service for Swedish-speakers, Riksradion, which was founded in 1961.

As of 2012, Yle Vega had a technical reach of 83% of Finns older than 9 years old. The daily reach of it and Yle X3M together was 3% of the population over age 9 in 2010, making them together the 10th largest radio "channel" in Finland at the time.

The music played by the station emphasizes Finland-Swedish music, and thus the station features little music with either Finnish lyrics or a focus on the Finnish culture. Much of the playlist is, however, taken by larger Swedish acts rather than smaller Finland-Swedish artists.

== Regional stations ==
Yle Vega also broadcasts regional content for five regions. These regions are:

- Vega Huvudstadsregionen: Finnish Capital Region, based in Helsinki (Helsingfors) and also available in other parts of Finland
- Vega Västnyland: Western Uusimaa (Nyland), based in Raseborg (Raasepori)
- Vega Östnyland: Eastern Uusimaa, based in Porvoo (Borgå)
- Vega Österbotten: Ostrobothnia, based in Vaasa (Vasa)
- Vega Åboland: Southwest Finland and Åland, based in Turku (Åbo) - Radio Vega's remit does not include coverage of events on Åland, since broadcasting there is a reserved matter for the autonomous provincial government in Mariehamn. Åland has its own public service radio and television service, Ålands Radio och TV.
