= List of supermarket chains in Finland =

This is a list of supermarket chains in Finland.

Name	Stores	Type of stores	Parent
Alepa	121	convenience	S Group
Alko	369	liquor	Finnish state
Food Market Herkku	1	supermarket	S Group
HalpaHalli	35	supermarket, department store	Kokkolan Halpa-Halli Oy
K-Citymarket	82	hypermarket	Kesko Oyj
K-Market	724	convenience, supermarket	Kesko Oyj
K-Supermarket	251	supermarket	Kesko Oyj
Lidl	208	discount, supermarket	Lidl Suomi Ky
M-Market	47	convenience, supermarket	M-Itsenäiset kauppiaat Oy
Minimani	7	hypermarket	Minimani Yhtiöt Oy
Pick N Pay	3	hypermarket	Unanimous Oy
Prisma	80	hypermarket	S Group
R-kioski	350	convenience	Reitan Group
S-Market	463	supermarket	S Group
Sale	298	convenience	S Group
Tokmanni	204	discount, department store	Tokmanni Group Oyj
