= Rytky =

- Village
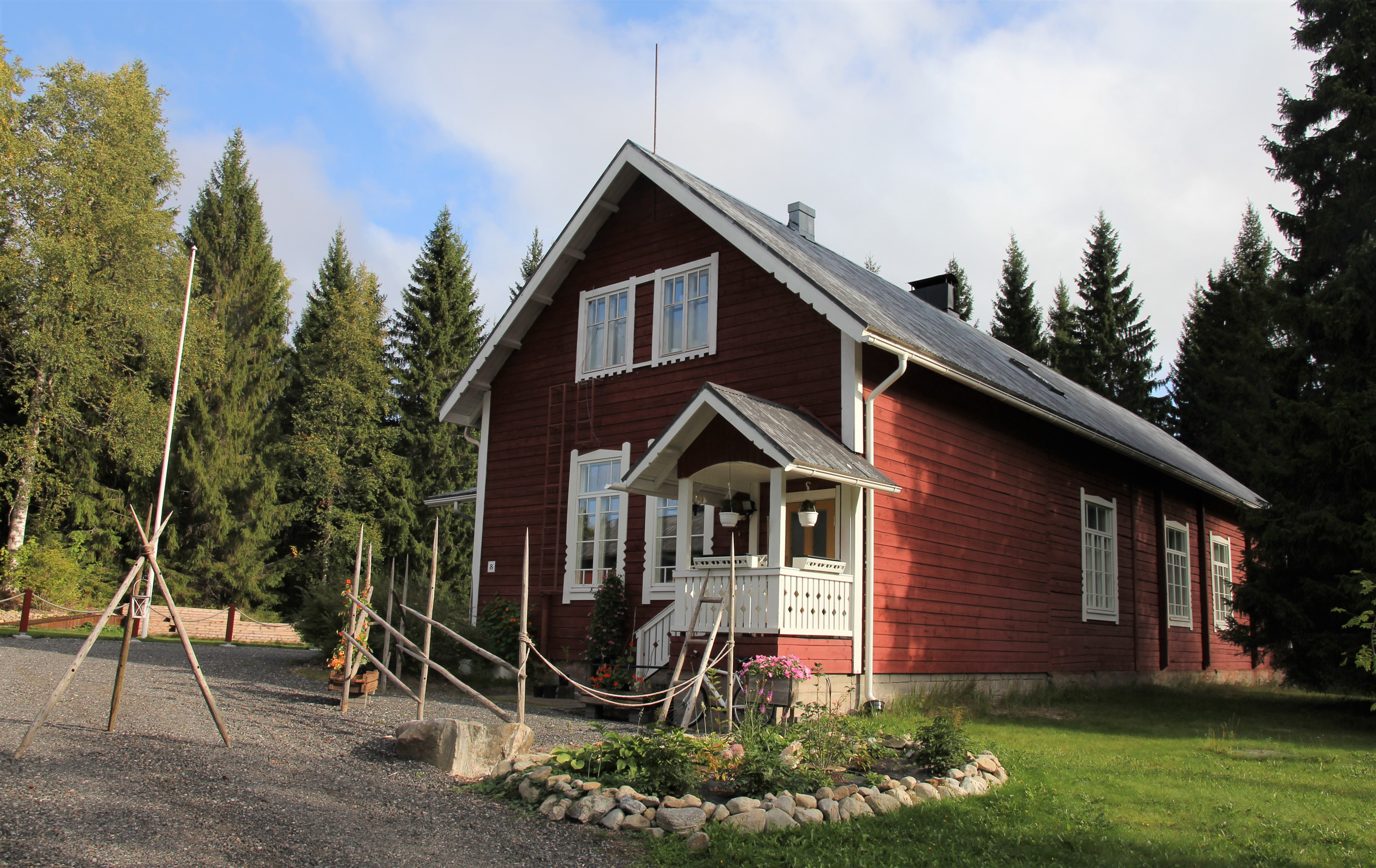
- A youth center in Rytky.

- Location in Finland
- Coordinates: 62°50.8568′N 27°23.4062′E
- Country: Finland
- Region: North Savo
- Municipality: Kuopio
- Time zone: UTC+2 (EET)
  - Summer (DST): UTC+3 (EEST)
- Postal code: 70800

Rytky (Finnish pronunciation: [ˈryt̪k̟y]) is a rural village in the western part of Kuopio, the city of North Savo, Finland. It is located near the Lake Rytky, about 19 kilometres (12 mi) southwest of the city centre towards Karttula.

Rytky is home to, among other things, a kindergarten, a summer camp and a youth center.

== See also ==
- Finnish regional road 551
