= Kuttajärvi =

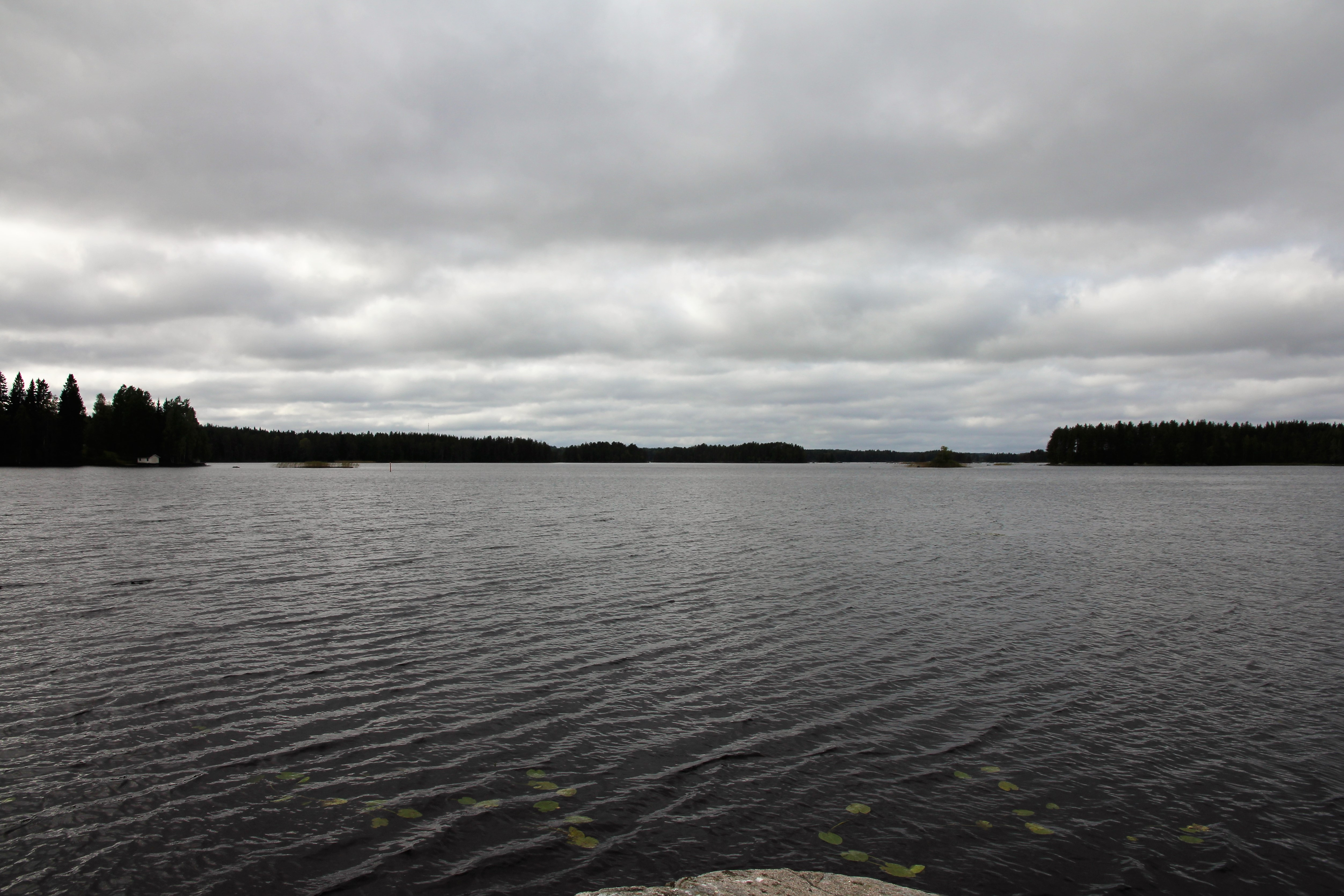

- Location within Finland
- Location: Karttula
- Coordinates: 62°51′N 27°07′E
- Type: Lake
- Primary inflows: river Kivijoki
- Primary outflows: Kuttakoski rapids to the lake Iisvesi
- Basin countries: Finland
- Surface area: 10.661 km^{2} (4.116 sq mi)
- Average depth: 4.08 m (13.4 ft)
- Max. depth: 22.7 m (74 ft)
- Water volume: 0.0441 km^{3} (35,800 acre⋅ft)
- Shore length^{1}: 79.96 km (49.68 mi)
- Surface elevation: 98.1 m (322 ft)
- Frozen: December–April
- Islands: Kuttasalo, Keihässalo, Ukko-Lokki
- ^{1} Shore length is not a well-defined measure.

Kuttajärvi is a medium-sized lake in the Kymijoki main catchment area. It is located in the North Savo region of Finland.

== See also ==
- List of lakes in Finland
- Syvänniemi – a village on the shores of lake
