= Finnish regional road 551 =

Road in Finland

Regional Road 551
- Yhdystie 551 (Finnish); Förbindelseväg 551 (Swedish)
- Blue Road: Sininen tie; Blå vägen; Karttula Road: Karttulantie; Karttula vägen
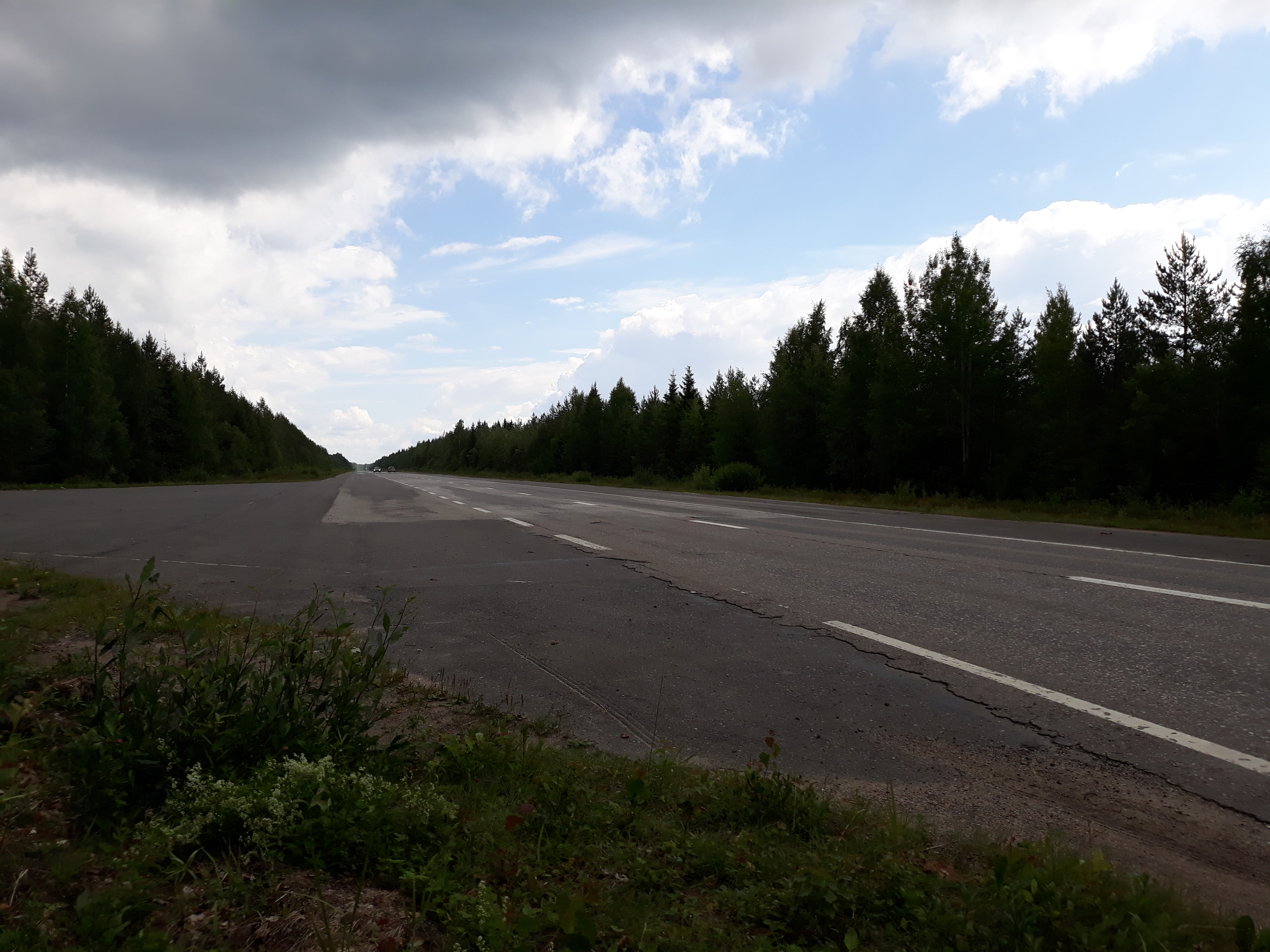

Route information
- Length: 80 km (50 mi)

Major junctions
- From: Kuopio
- To: Vesanto

Location
- Country: Finland

Highway system
- Highways in Finland

Finnish regional road 551 (Finnish: Seututie 551, Swedish: Regionalväg 551), or Blue Road (Finnish: Sininen tie, Swedish: Blå vägen), is an east–west road in North Savo, Finland, which in the east starts from Kuopio's Pitkälahti, located at Highway 5 (E63), and continues west through the centers of Karttula, Tervo and Vesanto all the way to the village of Ahveninen. The 80 kilometers long paved, dual lane road is part of the Blue Highway, known as a tourist route.

== Route ==
- Kuopio
  - Pitkälahti
  - Haminalahti
  - Rytky
  - Pihkainmäki
  - Syvänniemi
  - Karttula
- Tervo
  - Kirkonkylä
- Vesanto
  - Kivikylä
  - Kirkonkylä
  - Ahveninen
