= Syvänniemi =

Village in North Savo, Finland

- Village
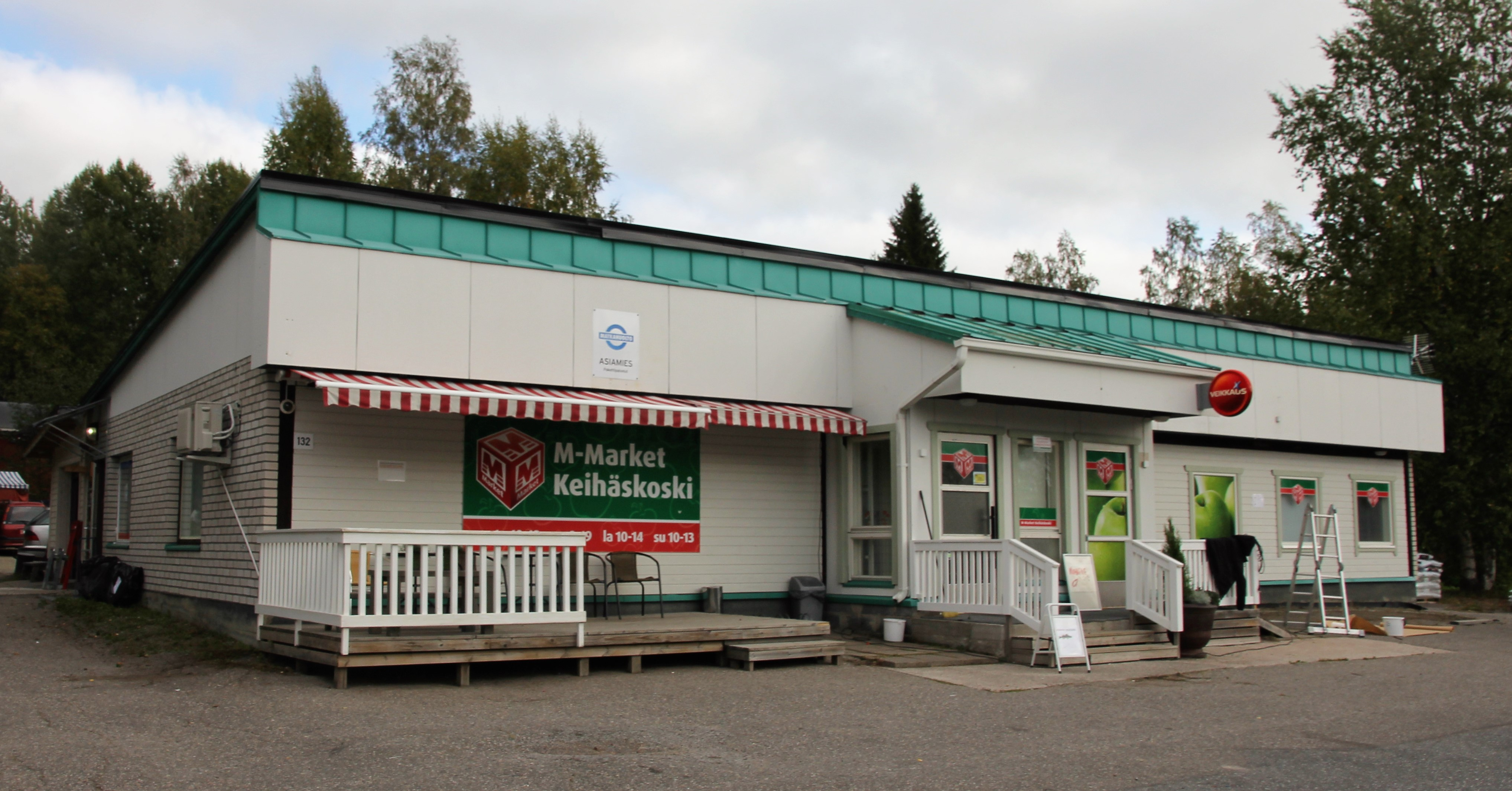
- M-Market Keihäskoski

- Location in Finland
- Coordinates: 62°51′21.6″N 27°09′25.2″E
- Country: Finland
- Region: North Savo
- Municipality: Kuopio

Area
  - Total: 1.83 km^{2} (0.71 sq mi)

Population (31 December 2023)
  - Total: 273
  - Density: 1,492/km^{2} (3,860/sq mi)
- Time zone: UTC+2 (EET)
  - Summer (DST): UTC+3 (EEST)
- Postal code: 71570
- Website: Official Site

Syvänniemi (Finnish pronunciation: [ˈsyʋænˌnie̯mi]) is a village in the western part of Kuopio, the city of North Savo, Finland. It is located near the Lake Kuttajärvi, about 30 kilometres (19 mi) west of the city centre towards Karttula. At the end of 2023, the village had 273 residents.

The village has a Lutheran church built in 1925 and an eukterion built in 1949. In the summer of 2019, the Buddhist Ratanasukha Monastery of the Finnish Burmese community, located in a former detached house, was opened in the village.

Syvänniemi was chosen as the village of the year in 2004.

== See also ==
- Finnish regional road 551
