= K-Supermarket =

Finnish supermarket chain (e. 1994)

Logo

K-Supermarket is a supermarket chain in Finland, owned by Kesko. There are over 250 stores in Finland. The K-Supermarket chain was founded year 1994 and the first store was opened in Nastola the same year. The stores are located in big and small cities.

== Gallery ==
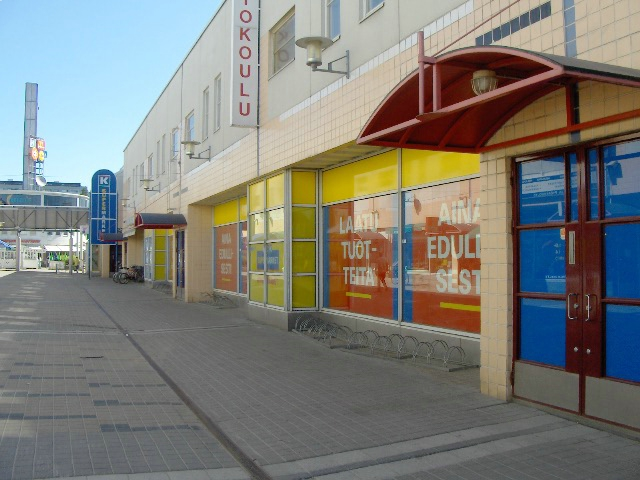
K-Supermarket Kontumarket in Helsinki.

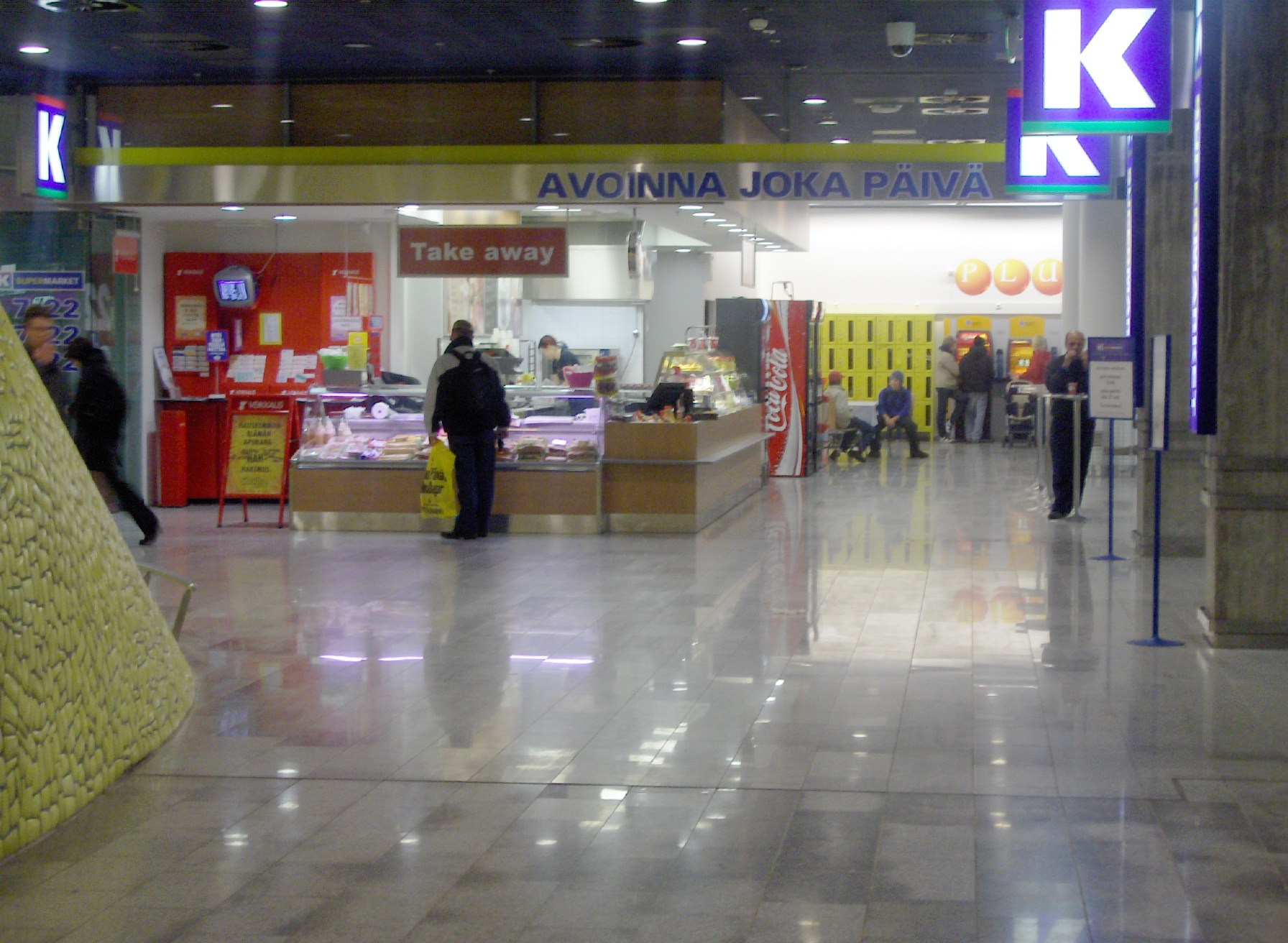
K-Supermarket Kamppi in Helsinki.

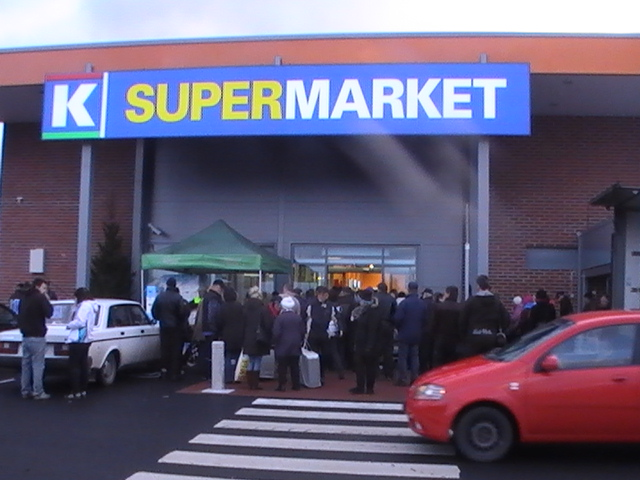
K-Supermarket Säkylä.

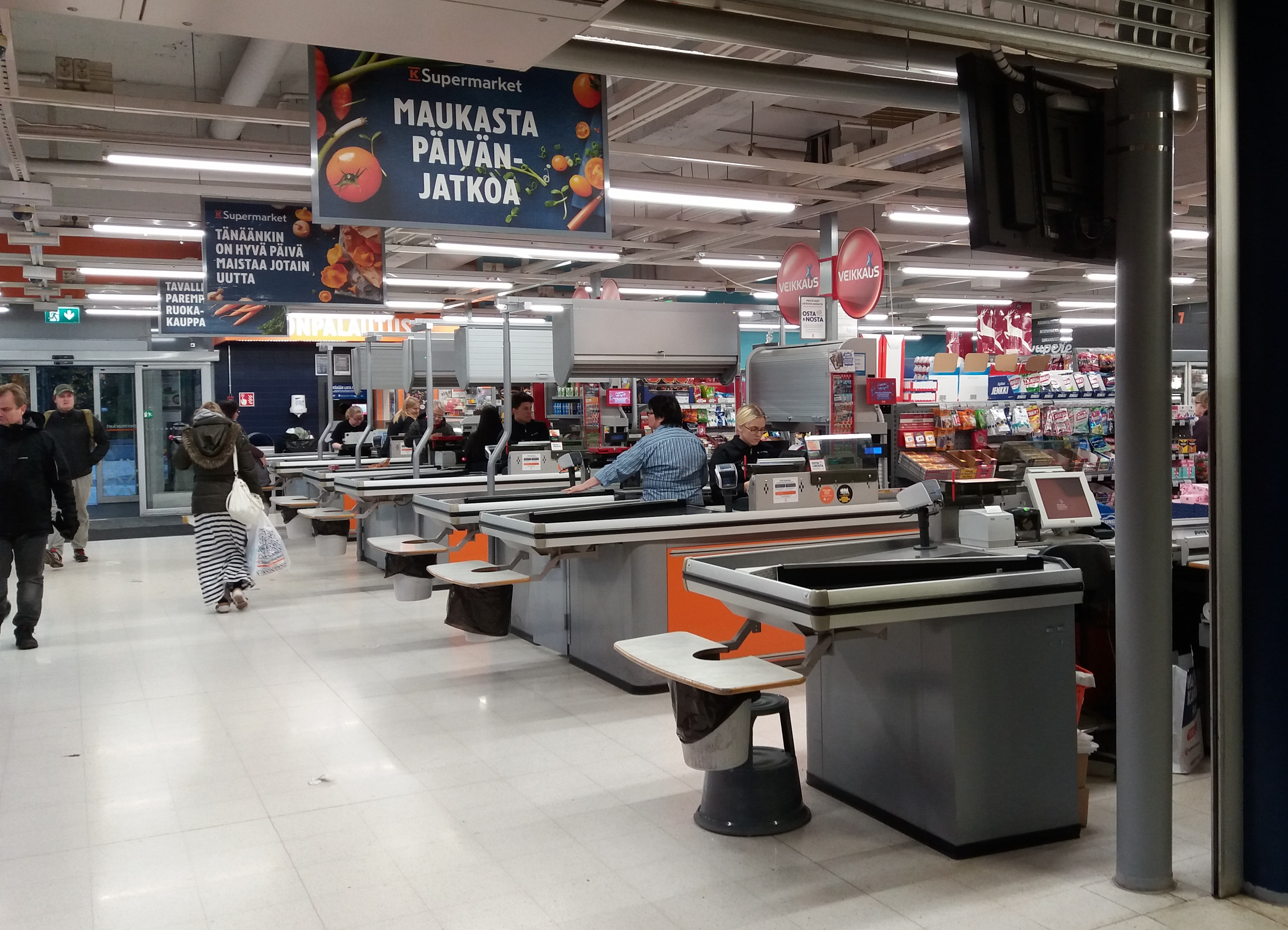
K-Supermarket Munkki in Helsinki.

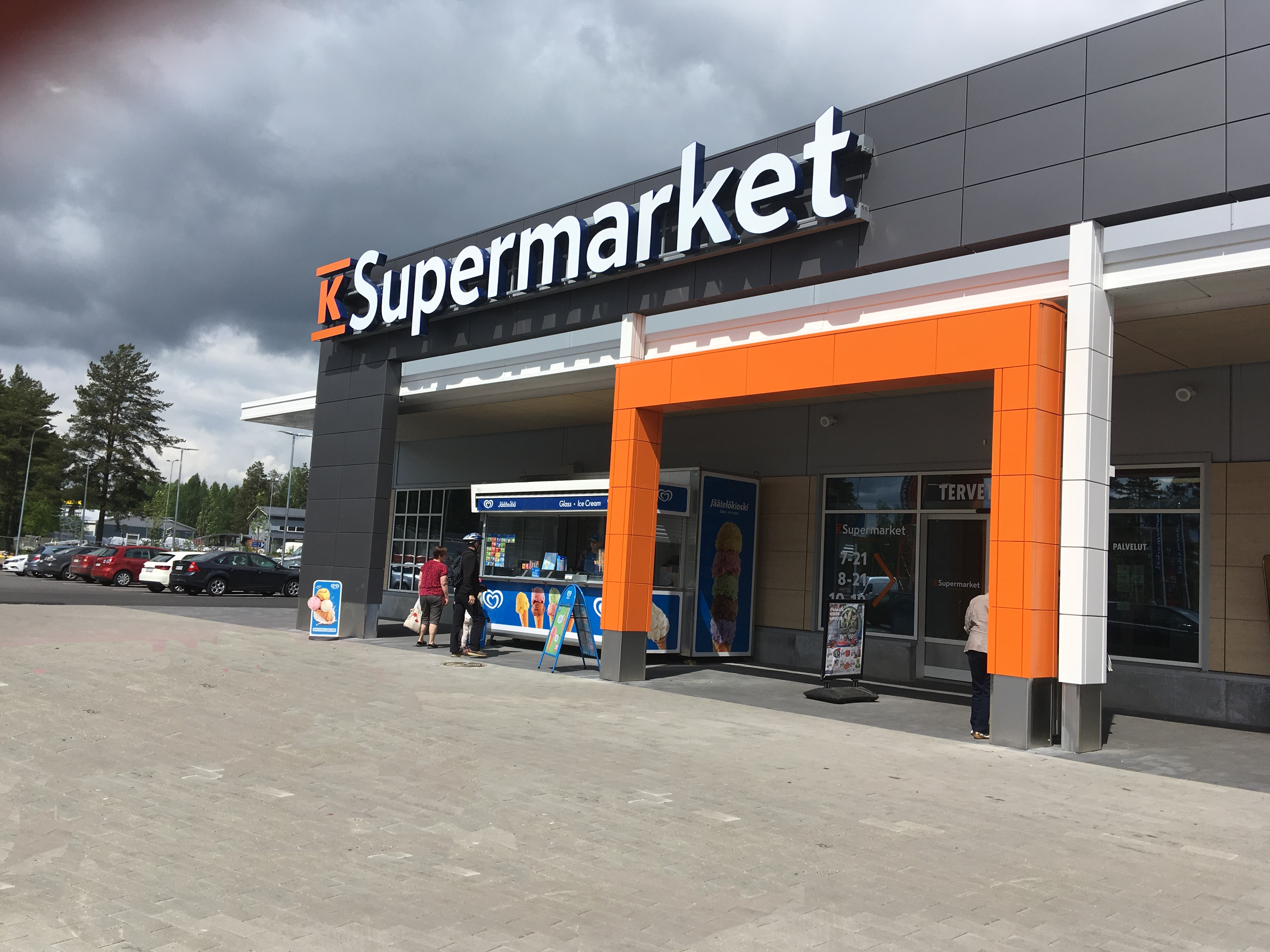
K-Supermarket Tarmola in Porvoo.

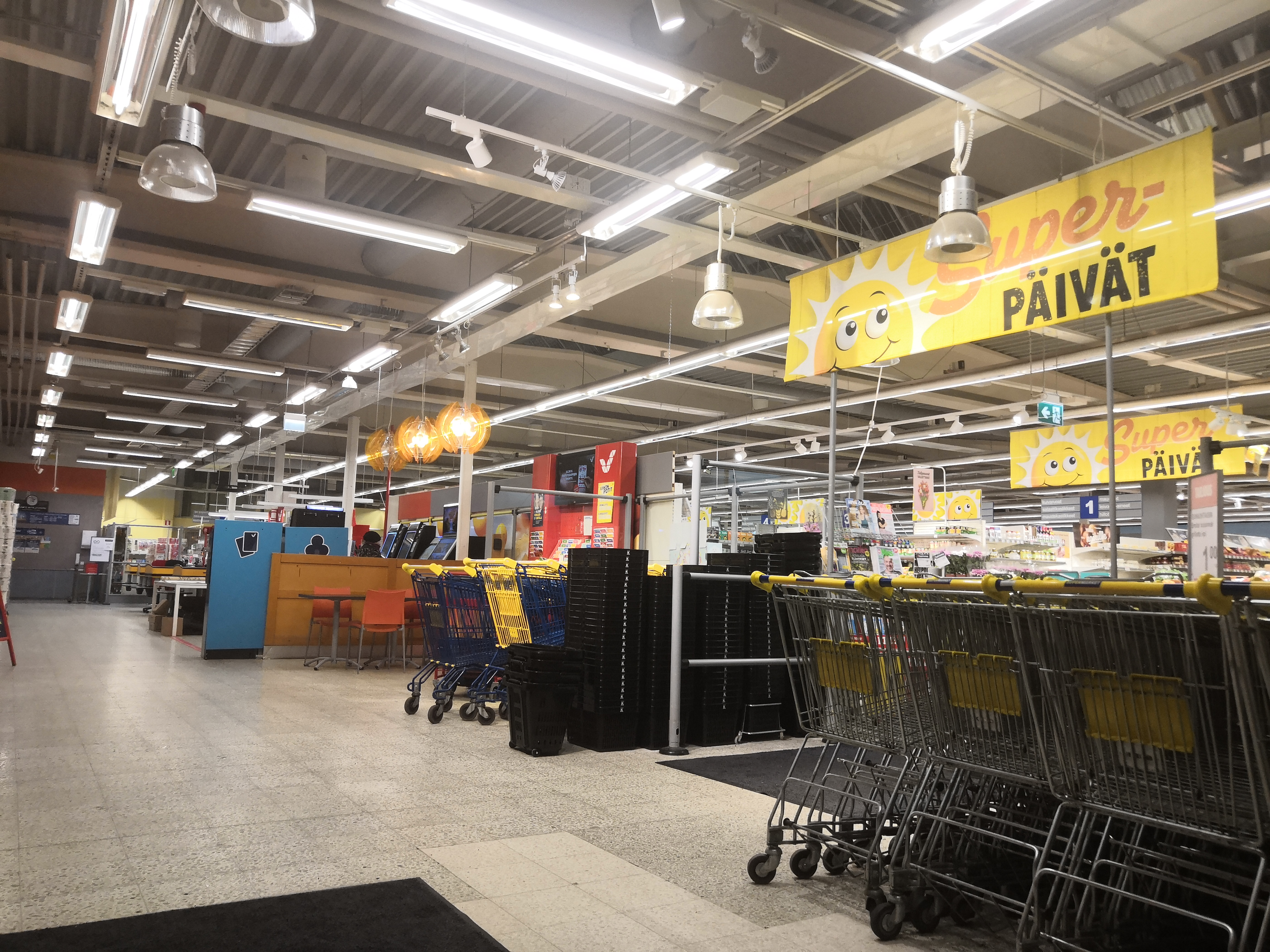
K-Supermarket Koskituuli in Kouvola.

== See also ==
K-Citymarket
