= Kesko =

Finnish retailing company

Kesko Corporation
- Native name: Finnish: Kesko Oyj; Swedish: Kesko Abp
- Type: Julkinen osakeyhtiö
- Traded as: Nasdaq Helsinki: KESKOB
- ISIN: FI0009007900
- Industry: Retail
- Founded: 1940; 86 years ago
- Headquarters: Helsinki, Finland
- Key people: Jorma Rauhala (President and CEO), Esa Kiiskinen (Chairman)
- Services: Supermarkets and hypermarkets, hardware retail, auto sales, department stores, consumer durables
- Revenue: ▲€12.47 billion (2025)
- Operating income: ▲€655 million (2025)
- Net income: ▼€404 million (2025)
- Total assets: ▲€8.82 billion (2025)
- Total equity: ▼€2.83 billion (2025)
- Number of employees: c. 39,000 (average, 2025)
- Website: www.kesko.fi

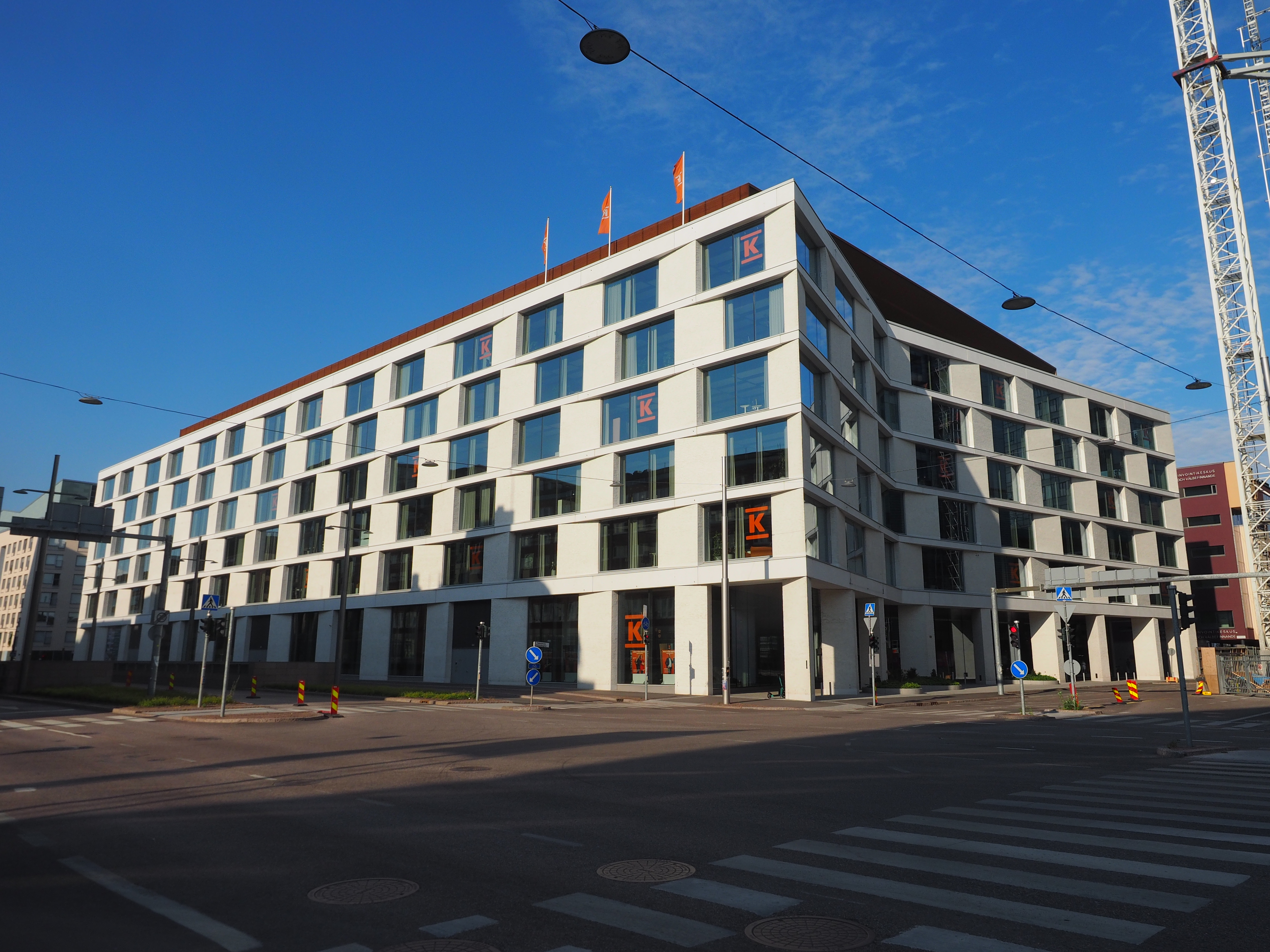
Kesko headquarters in Kalasatama, Helsinki, Finland

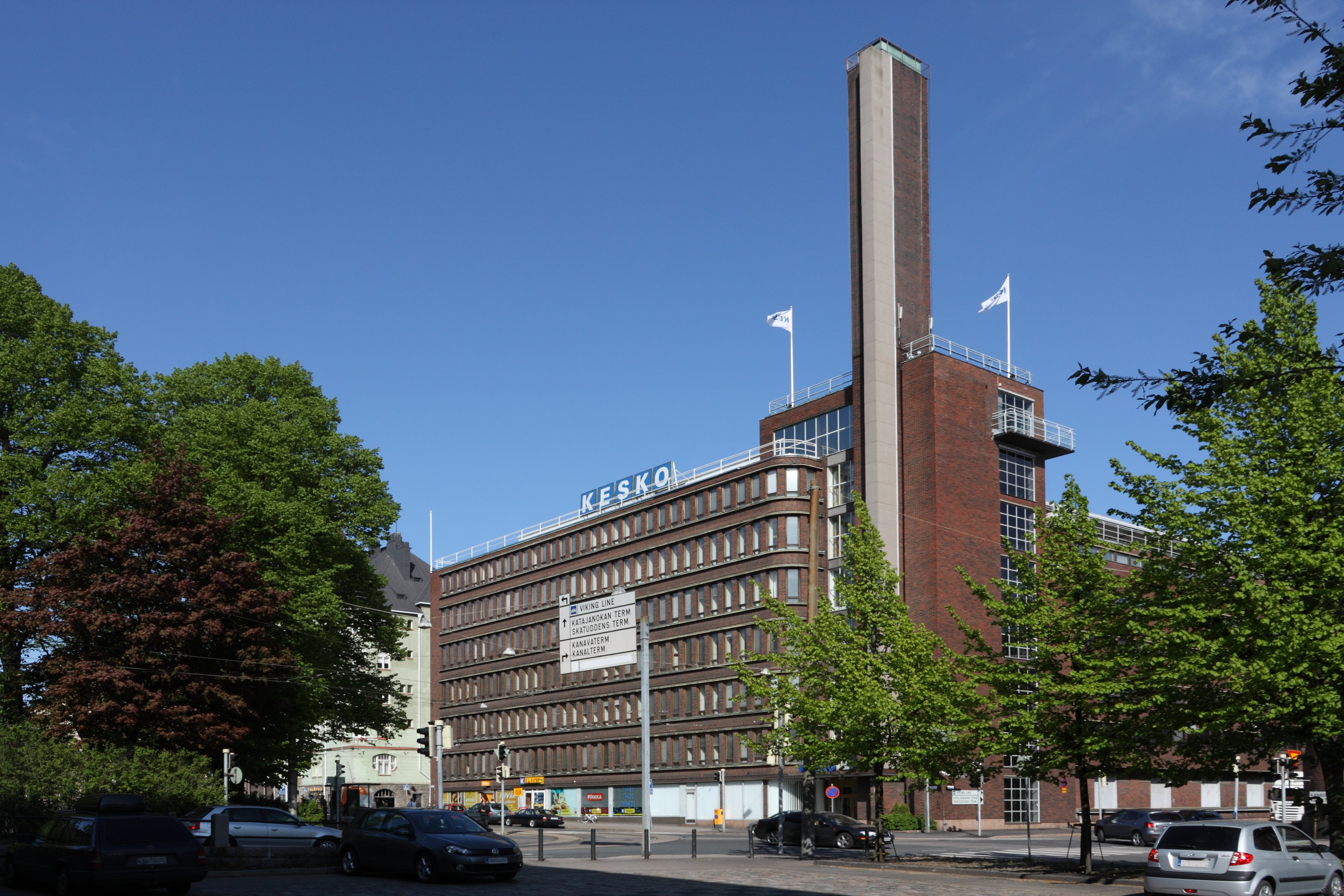
Former Kesko headquarters in Katajanokka, Helsinki, Finland

Kesko Corporation (Finnish: Kesko Oyj, Swedish: Kesko Abp) is a Finnish retailing conglomerate with its head office in Kalasatama, Helsinki. It is engaged in the grocery trade, building and technical trade, and car trade. It also has operations in Sweden, Norway, Denmark, Estonia, Latvia, Lithuania, and Poland.

== History ==
Kesko was formed when four regional wholesaling companies that had been founded by retailers were merged in October 1940.

The new Kesko company started operating at the beginning of 1941. The need to purchase goods for the shareholder-retailers and to support their business operations and start cooperation among them resulted in the forming of the K-retailer group.

By the end of the 1940s, Kesko's sales amounted to about 15 billion old Finnish markkas (equivalent to EUR 580 million in 2010), which was about 12% of the overall sales of the central companies operating in the Finnish trading sector.

== Divisions ==
=== Grocery trade ===
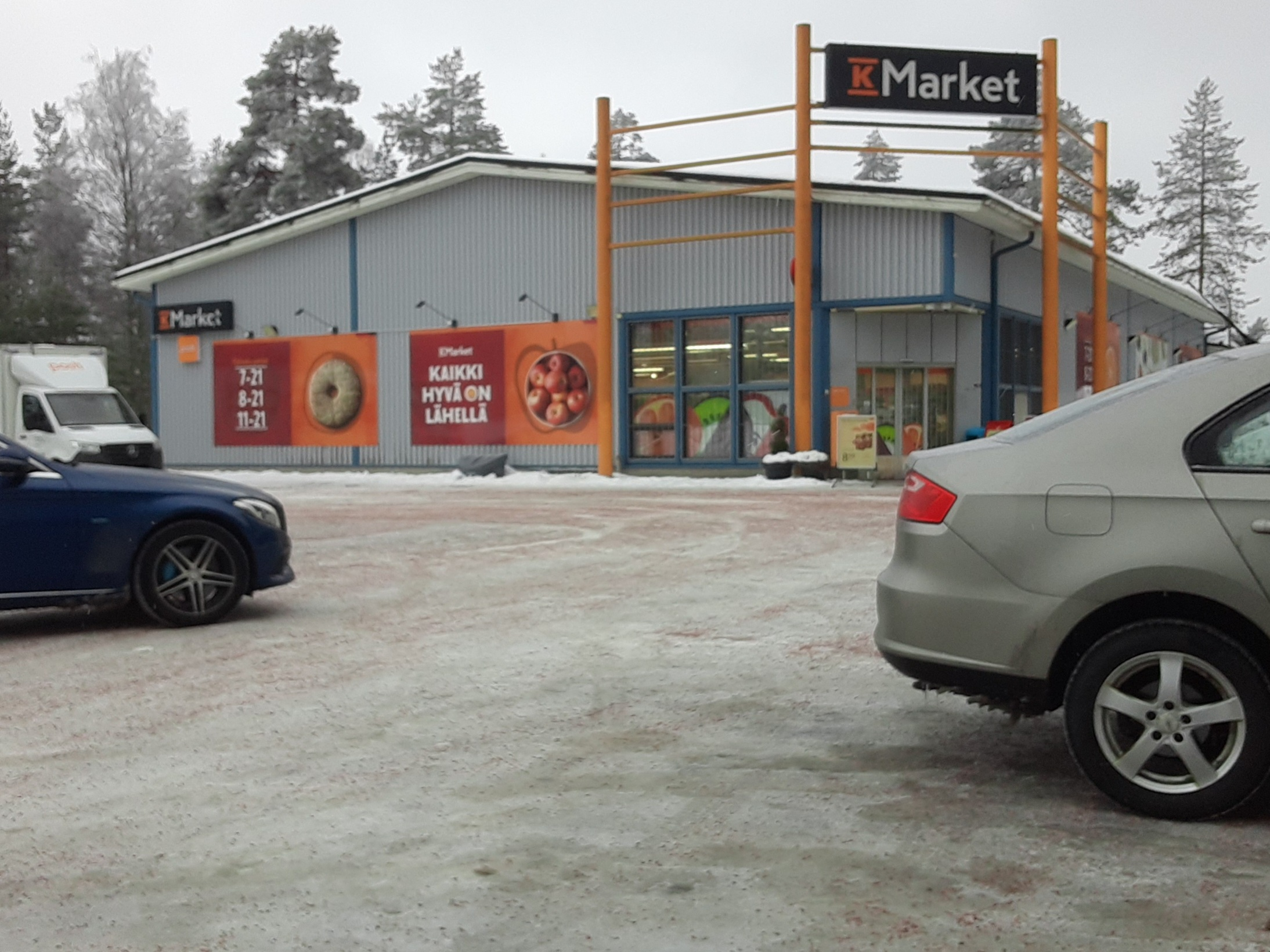
K-Market Lohjanportti in Muijala, Lohja, Finland

Kesko's grocery trade division is a key operator in the Finnish grocery trade. The division's main functions include the centralised purchasing of products, selection management, logistics, and the development of chain concepts and the store network.

The division's grocery store chains are K-Market, K-Supermarket and K-Citymarket. In 2021, the chains comprised 1,200 grocery stores, run by some 1,000 independent K-retailers. Over 500 of the stores also offered online grocery sales services.

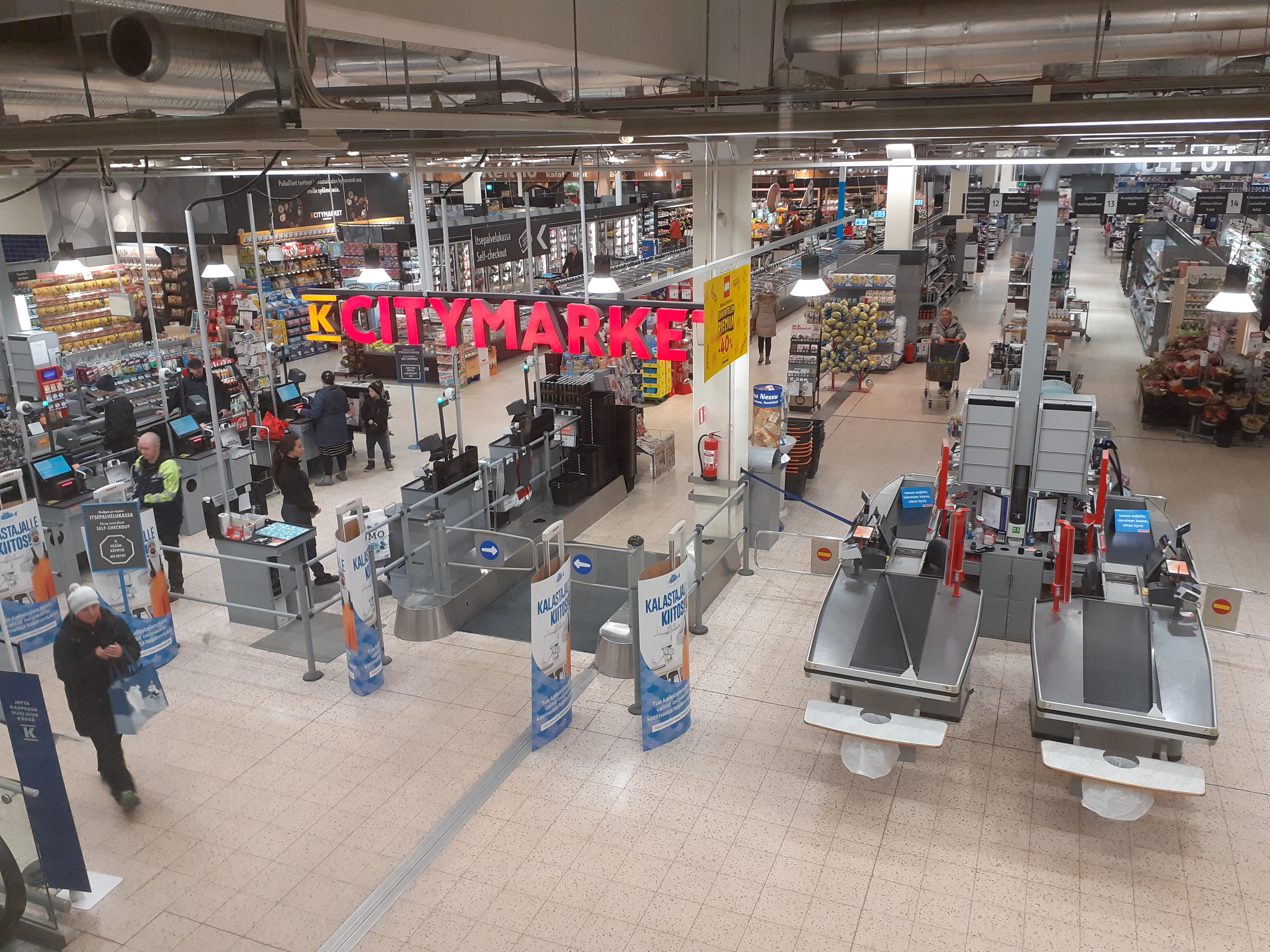
K-Citymarket store of the Viiri shopping centre in Klaukkala, Finland

Formerly Kesko called these four size-grades of their shops K (small), KK (middle-sized), KKK (large), and KKKK (largest), and the chain names were K Extra, K Lähikauppa (= "local shop"), KK Market, KKK Supermarket and KKKK Citymarket; but this naming system has been changed.

Kesko's grocery private brands include Pirkka, Pirkka Parhaat and K-menu.

The main competitors are Prisma, S-market and Alepa/Sale of S Group, M chain stores, and Lidl.

Kesko company Kespro is the leading wholesaler in the Finnish HoReCa business.

Kesko also used to have small convenience stores, cafes and restaurants which operated at staffed service stations of Neste oil corporation. These service station facilities were branded as Neste K. The convenience stores were commonly found in Neste K station, while whether the station has a cafe or restaurant depended on the size and location of the station. Cafes were branded as Koon Kahvila and restaurants as Koon Keittiö. Kesko discontinued the Neste K stores in 2024 and they are currently operated solely by Neste.

K-citymarket's home and speciality goods trade is part of the grocery trade division.

=== Building and technical trade ===
Kesko's building and technical trade division operates in Finland, Sweden, Norway, Estonia, Latvia, Lithuania and Poland. Its chains are Onninen, which serves technical professionals, and K-Rauta, Byggmakker and K-Bygg, which serve both professional builders and consumers.

The division's main functions include the centralised development of chain selections, centralised purchasing and logistics, and the development of chain concepts and the store network.

K-Rauta and Intersport stores in Finland are operated by retailer entrepreneurs. The international business model combines the category management, purchasing, logistics, information system control and network improvements of the company's chains which operate in different countries.

=== Car trade ===
The car trade segment consists of K-Auto (formerly operated as VV-Auto).

- K-Auto imports and markets Volkswagen, Audi, Porsche, Cupra, SEAT and Bentley passenger cars and Volkswagen commercial vehicles in Finland. Kesko’s own outlets and independent dealers sell new and used cars and offer servicing and aftersales services at 71 locations across Finland. The division's K-Lataus network offers electric vehicle charging facilities at K Group store locations around Finland.

K-Auto represents the leading brands in their market area and are responsible for the sales and after-sales services of these brands either through their own or dealer network. The dealer network is complemented by a network of contract service centres.

The division also comprises leisure trade and the chains Intersport and Budget Sport.

== Market share and competitors ==
In 2014, Kesko's market share in food trade in Finland was 33.1% (Nielsen). At that point, Kesko's competitors in food trade in 2014 were S Group (45.7%), Lidl (7.6%), Suomen Lähikauppa (6.8%), and M chain stores (Nielsen). Kesko later acquired Suomen Lähikauppa in 2016 and the deal increased Kesko's share of the market to about estimated 40%.

In 2019 Nielsen report, Kesko's market share in grocery trade was estimated to be 36.5%.

== Acquisition of Suomen Lähikauppa ==
In April 2016 Kesko completed the acquisition of a competitor Suomen Lähikauppa's stores. In the deal, Kesko acquired all the Valintatalo and Siwa stores. However the Finnish Competition and Consumer Authority (FCCA) approved the acquisition with a condition that Kesko must sell at least 60 of the stores to competitors. All the Siwas and Valintatalos have been rebranded as K-Market stores as of 2017. The total number of stores owned by Suomen Lähikauppa before the acquisition was 643 and it employed 4100 employees. In the same acquisition Kesko also was initially obligated to keep using Tuko Logistics Cooperative as the main supplier for the bought stores for 18 months, but FCCA later revoked this decision on appeal.

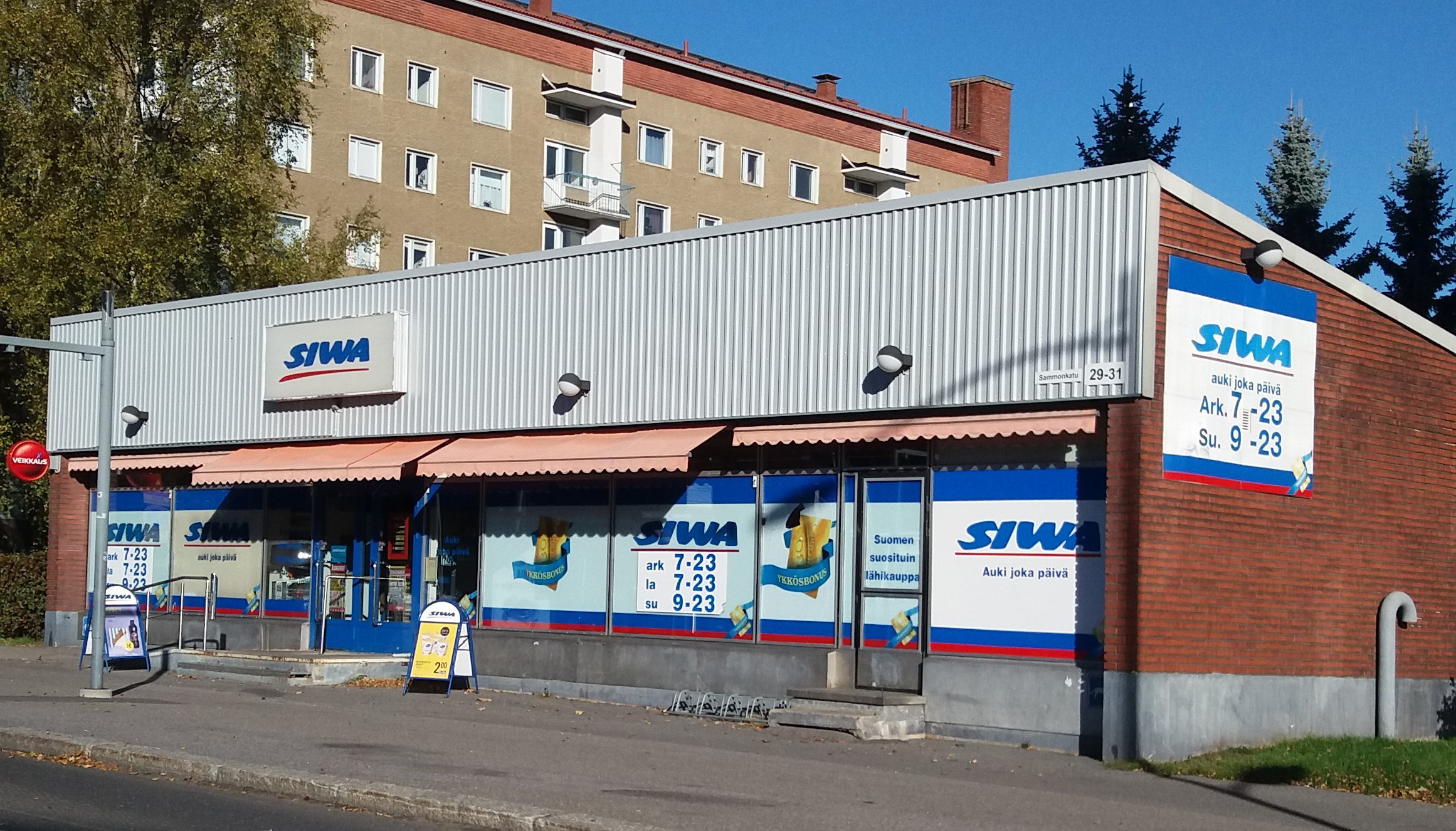
Siwa store

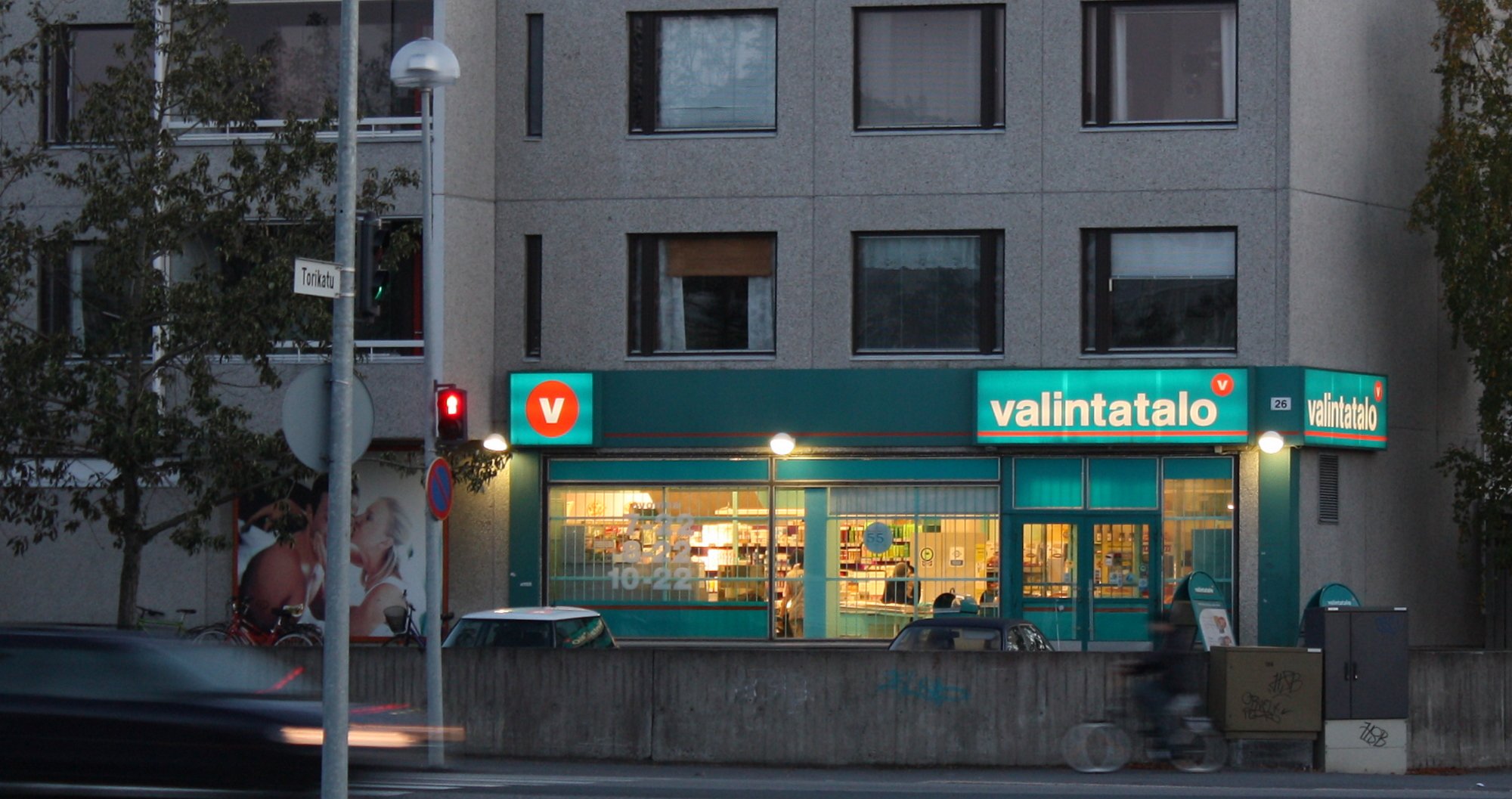
Valintatalo

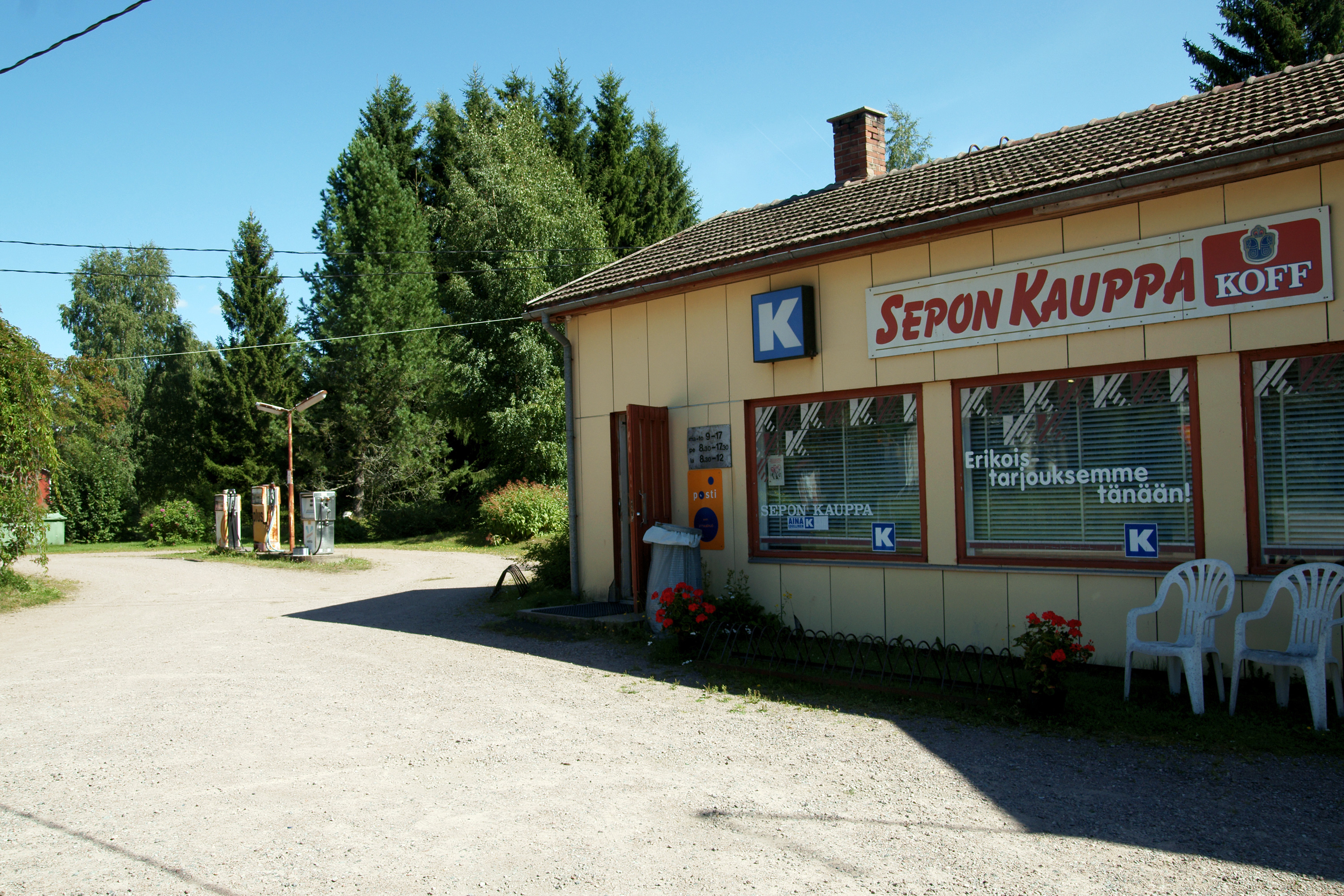
Old Kesko village store (Sepon kauppa)

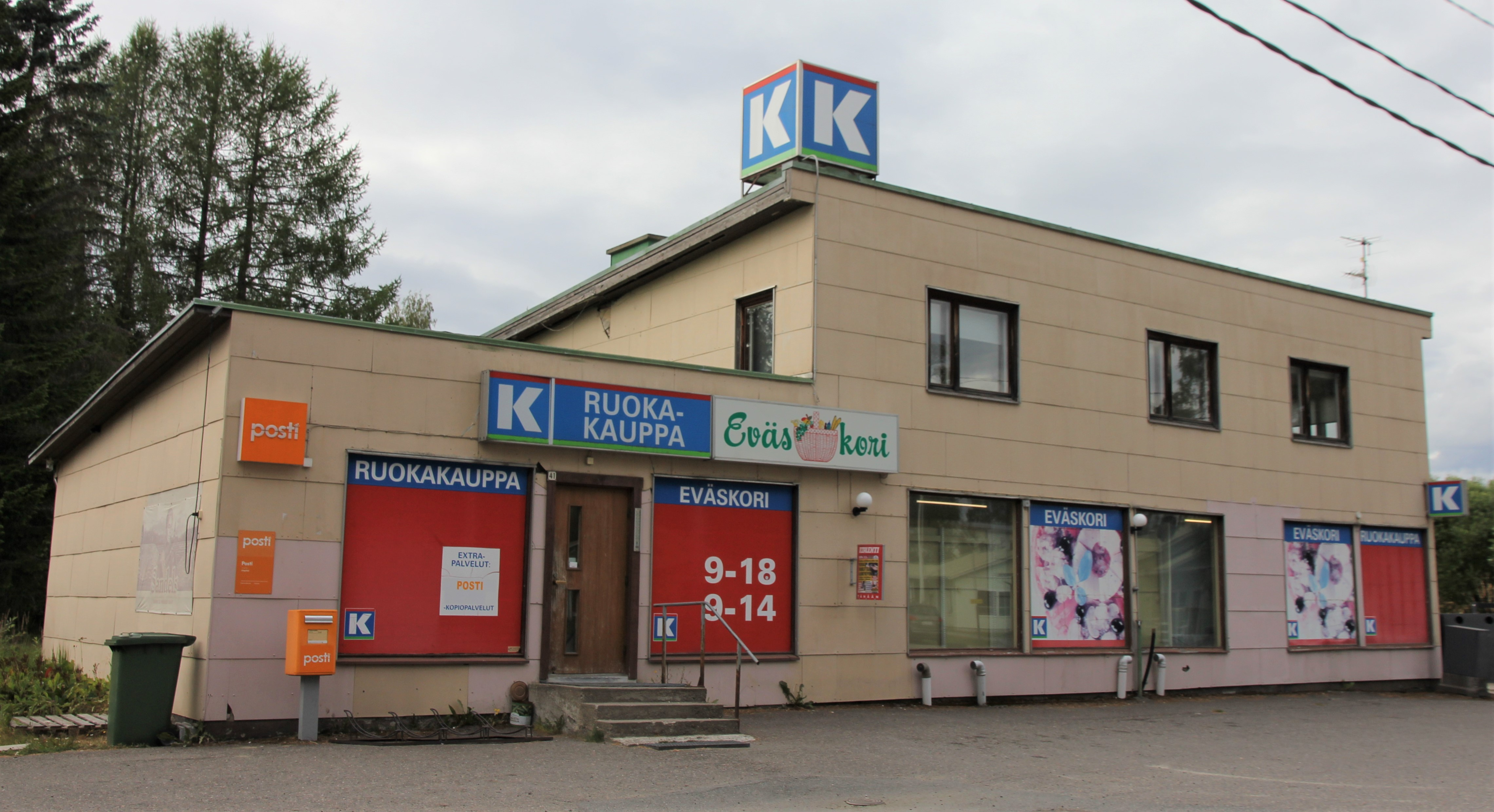
Old K grocery store

== Notable changes in company structure ==
=== Retail chain closures ===
- Musta Pörssi home electronics retail chain
- Kookenkä and The Athlete's Foot shoe retailers

=== Sales of retail chains ===
- Anttila
- Asko and Sotka furniture retail chains
- Kodin1
- Konekesko, a service company specialising in the import, marketing and after-sales services of recreational machinery, construction and materials handling machinery and agricultural machinery. Kesko divested Konekesko operations in 2018-2020
- Rautia Ironmongery store
Musta Pörssi logo

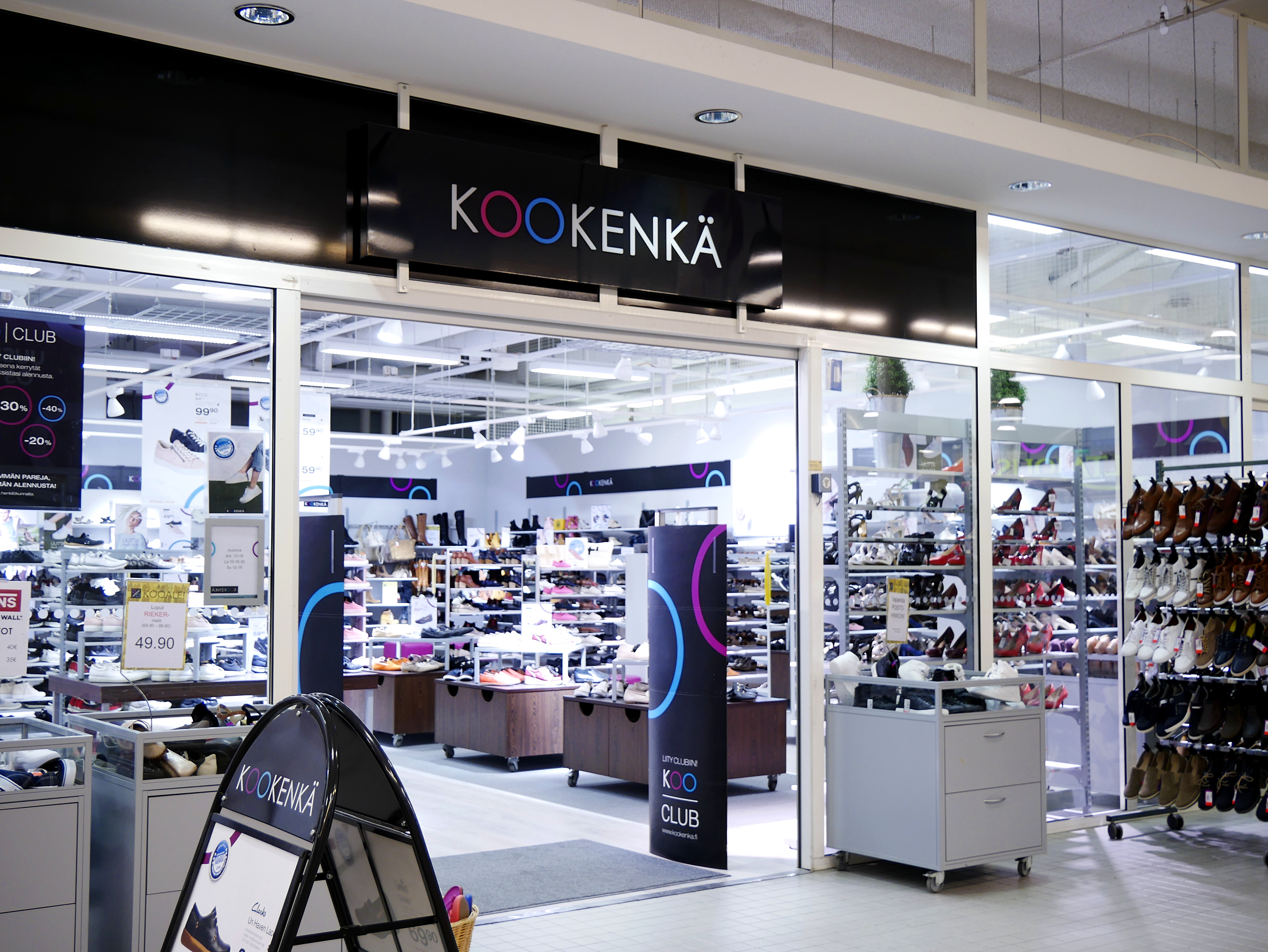
Kookenkä

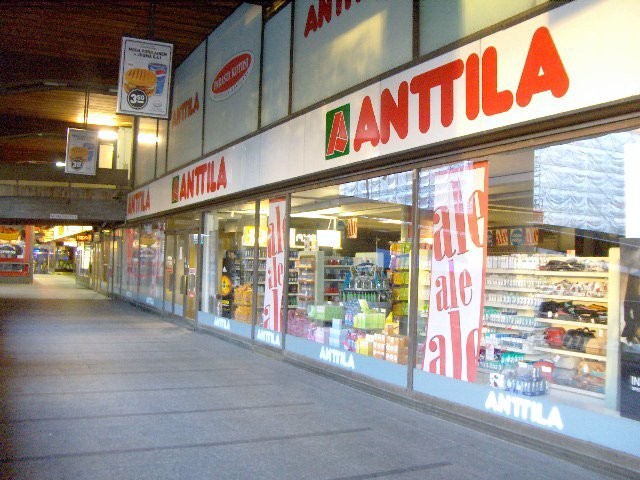
Anttila

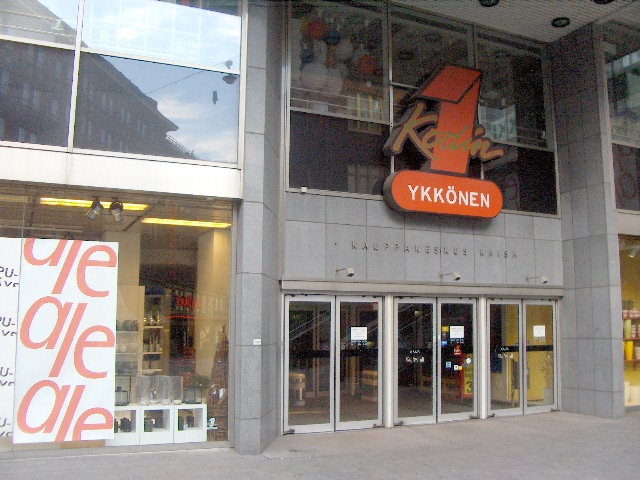
Kodin ykkönen

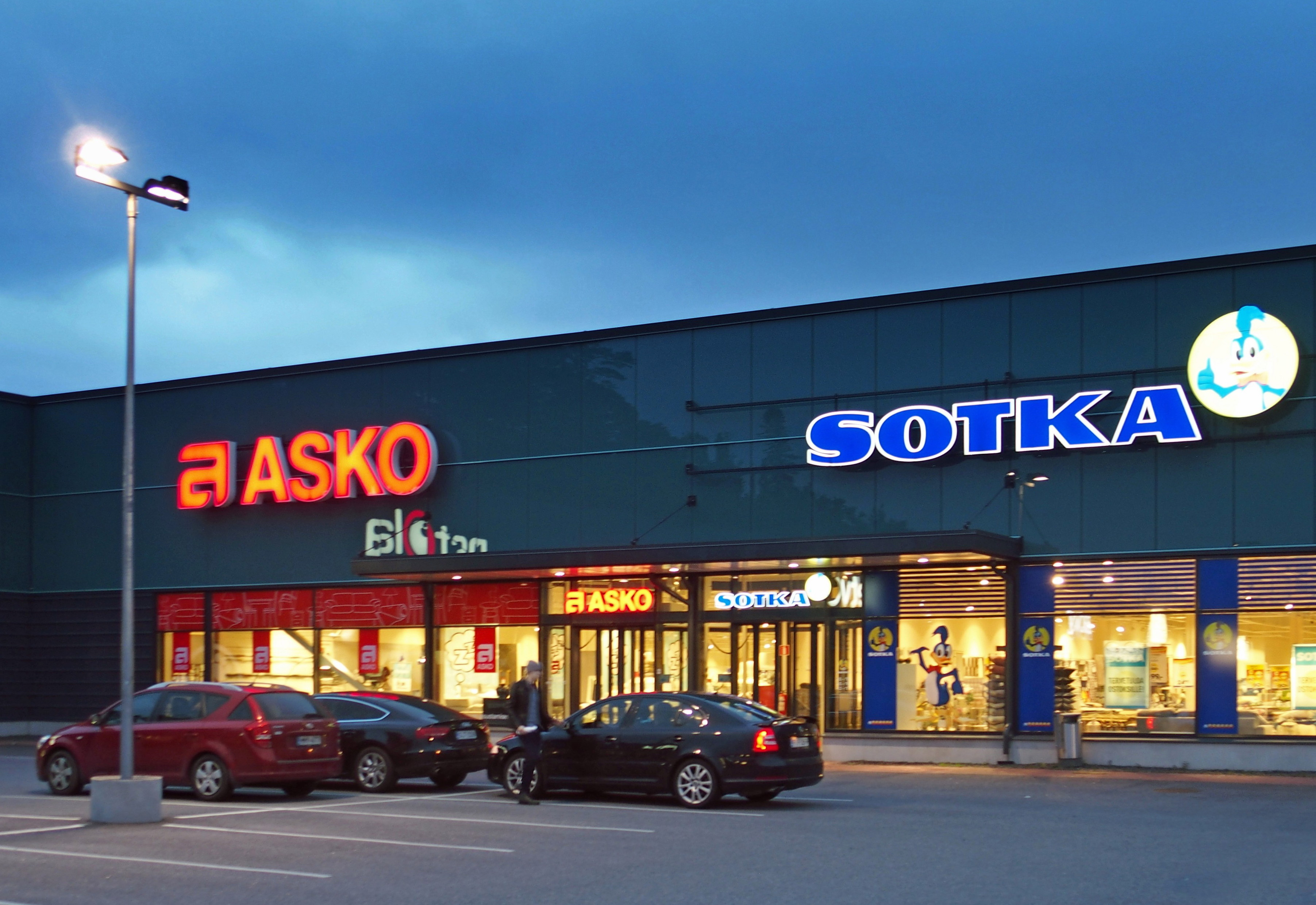
Asko and Sotka

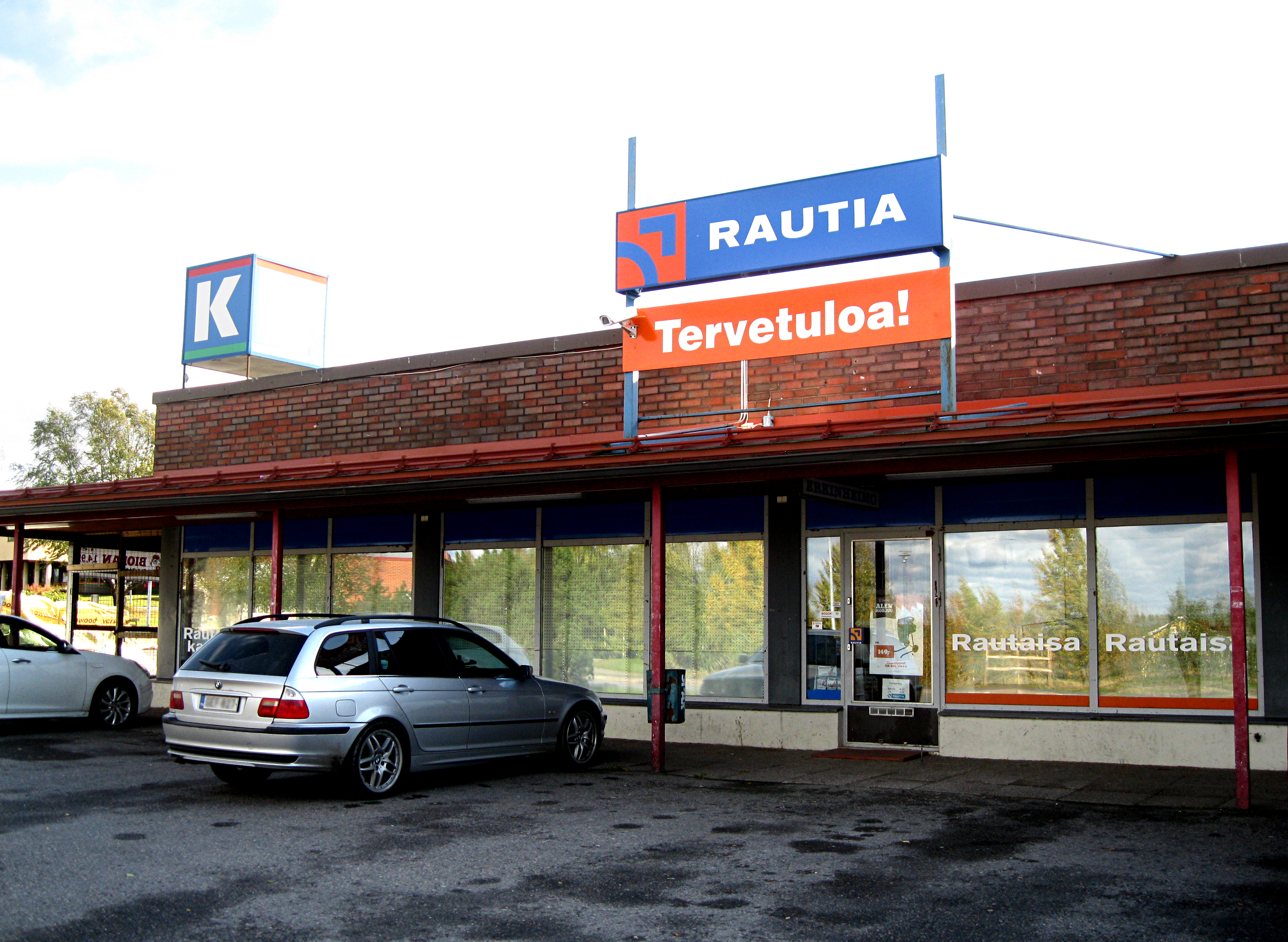
Rautia
