= K-Citymarket =

Finnish hypermarket chain

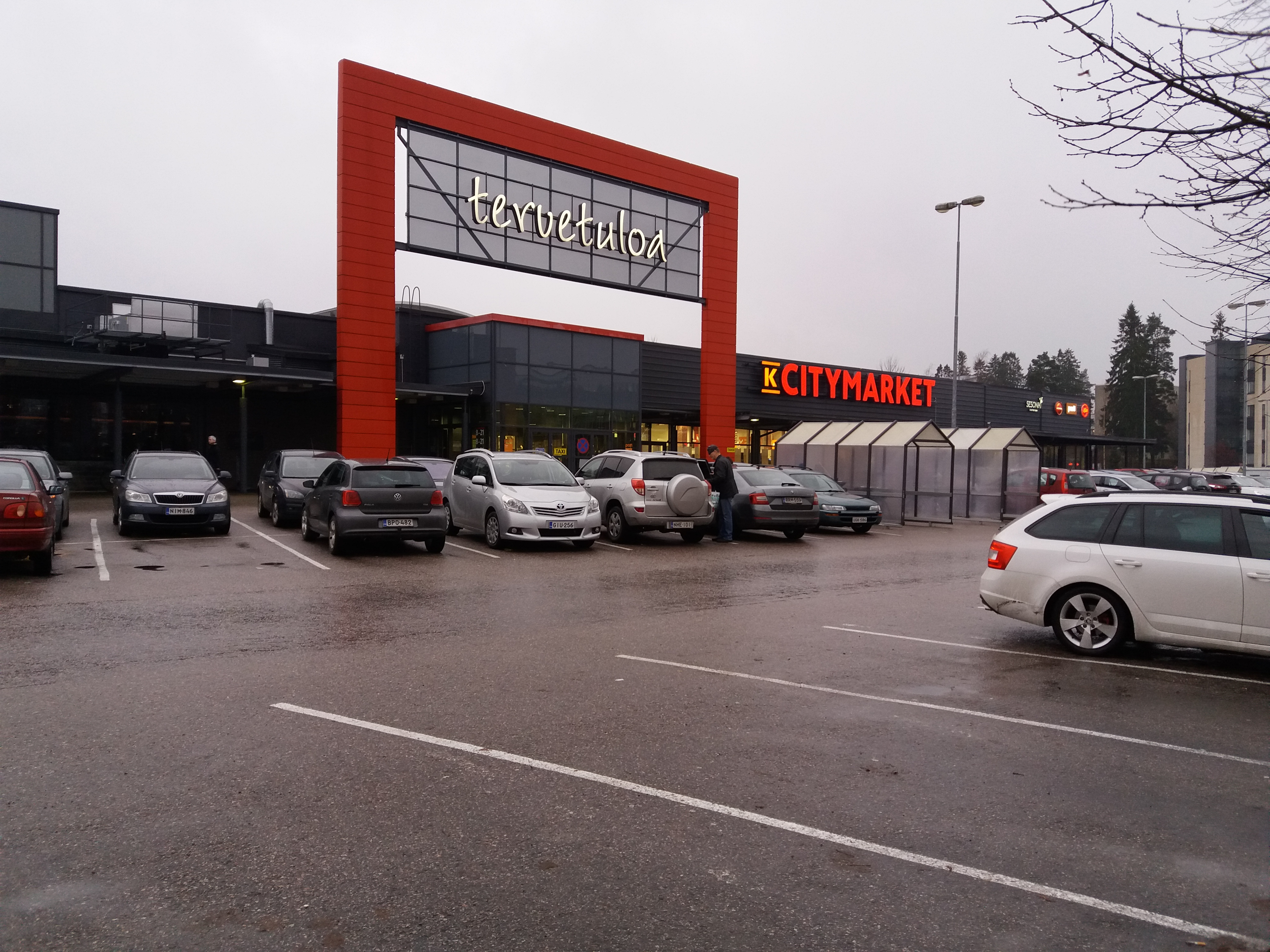
- K-Citymarket store in Järvenpää.
- Industry: Retail
- Founded: 1971
- Headquarters: Finland
- Area served: Finland
- Owner: Kesko
- Website: K-Citymarket.fi

Former logo

K-Citymarket is a Finnish hypermarket chain owned by Kesko. The chain has about 80 stores in Finland. The first K-Citymarket store was opened in Lahti in 1971. The size of the stores are between 7,000 m^{2} (75,000 sq ft) to 10,000 m^{2} (110,000 sq ft). In all K-Citymarkets, a K-retailer is responsible for the sale of groceries, and Kesko for the consumer goods side. K-Citymarket's selections include foodstuffs as well as clothing, leisure, sports and home products.

== History ==
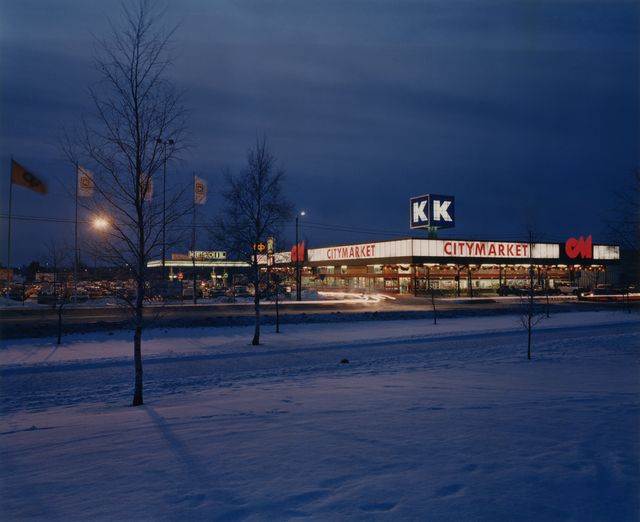
K-Citymarket in 1987

The first Citymarket store was opened in the neighbourhood of Paavola in the city of Lahti in 1971. The name Citymarket came from the City-Otra department store in Tampere, which Kesko partly owned. Kesko opened seven Citymarket stores in the 1970s and in the 2020s there were over 80 stores in big and medium-sized stores across Finland.

The first Citymarket in the Baltic countries was opened in 2001 in Riga. At the end of 2002, there were four Citymarkets in Estonia and two Citymarkets in Latvia. Year 2004 Kesko and ICA formed the Rimi Baltic company and all the K-Citymarkets (together with ICA-stores) were changed to Rimi Baltic stores. Kesko sold its part of the Rimi Baltic company to ICA year 2006.

== Gallery ==
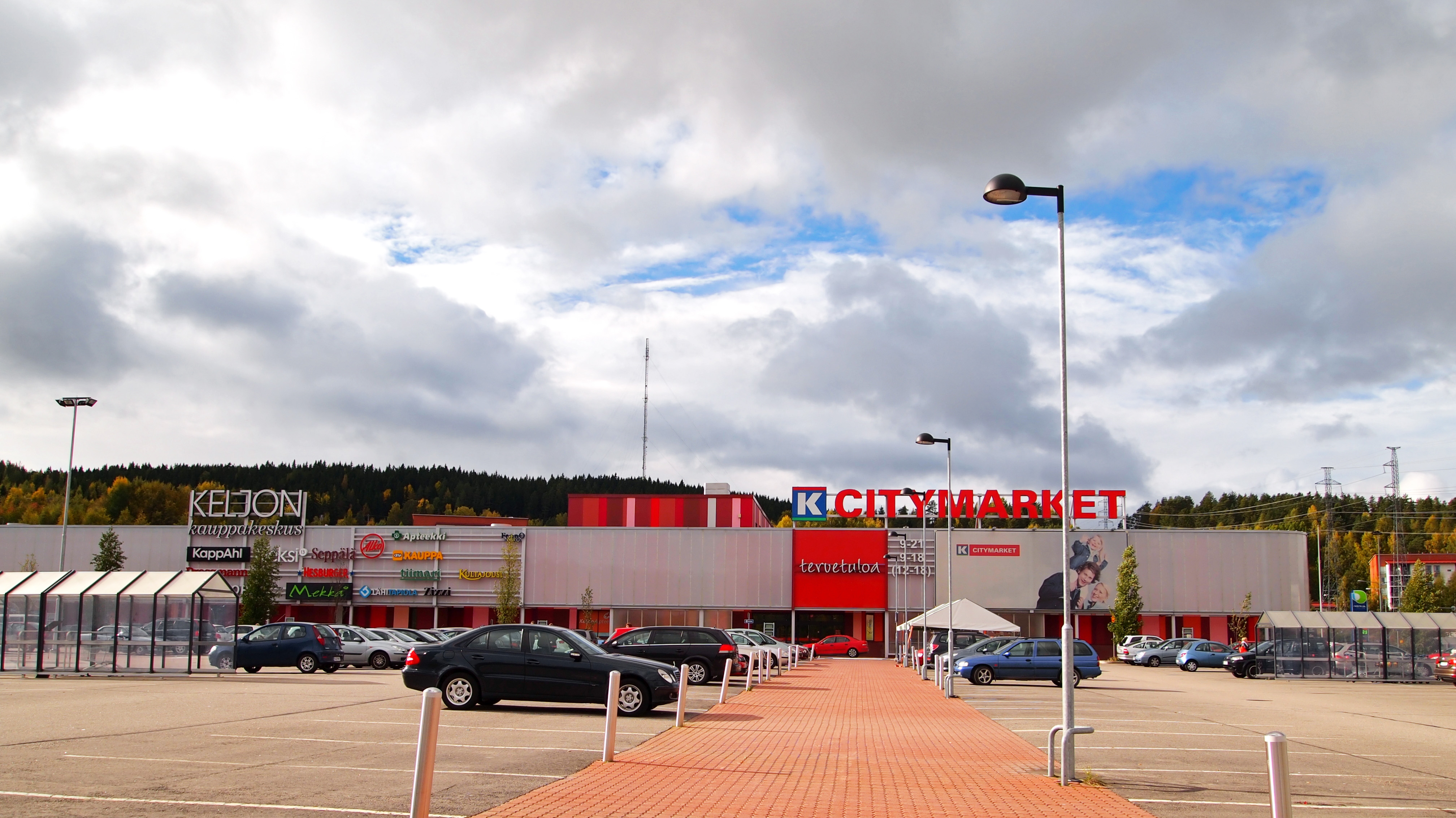
Jyväskylä: Keljo

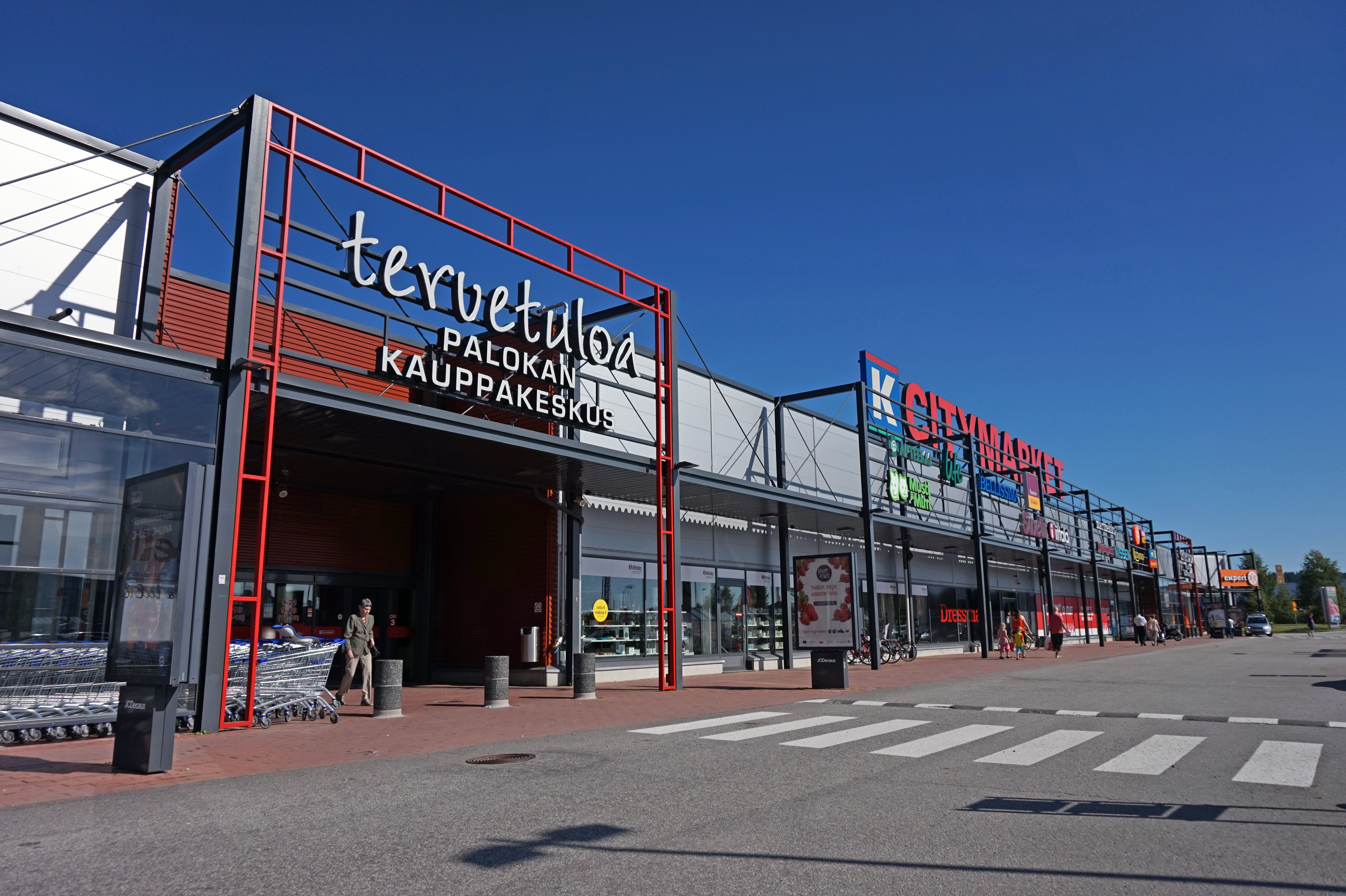
Jyväskylä: Palokka

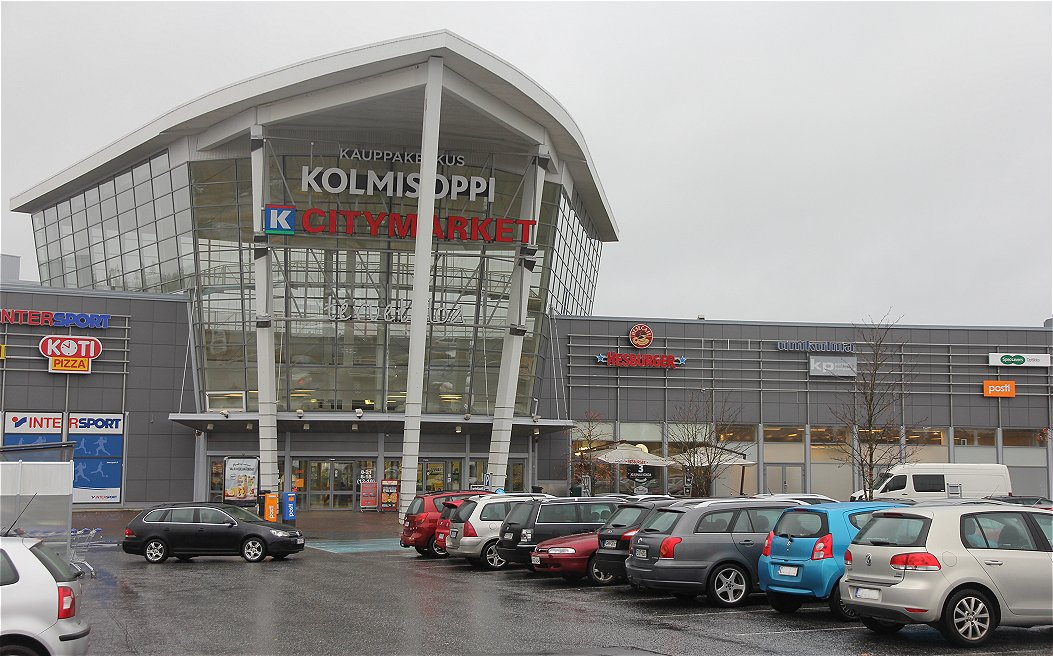
Kuopio: Kolmisoppi

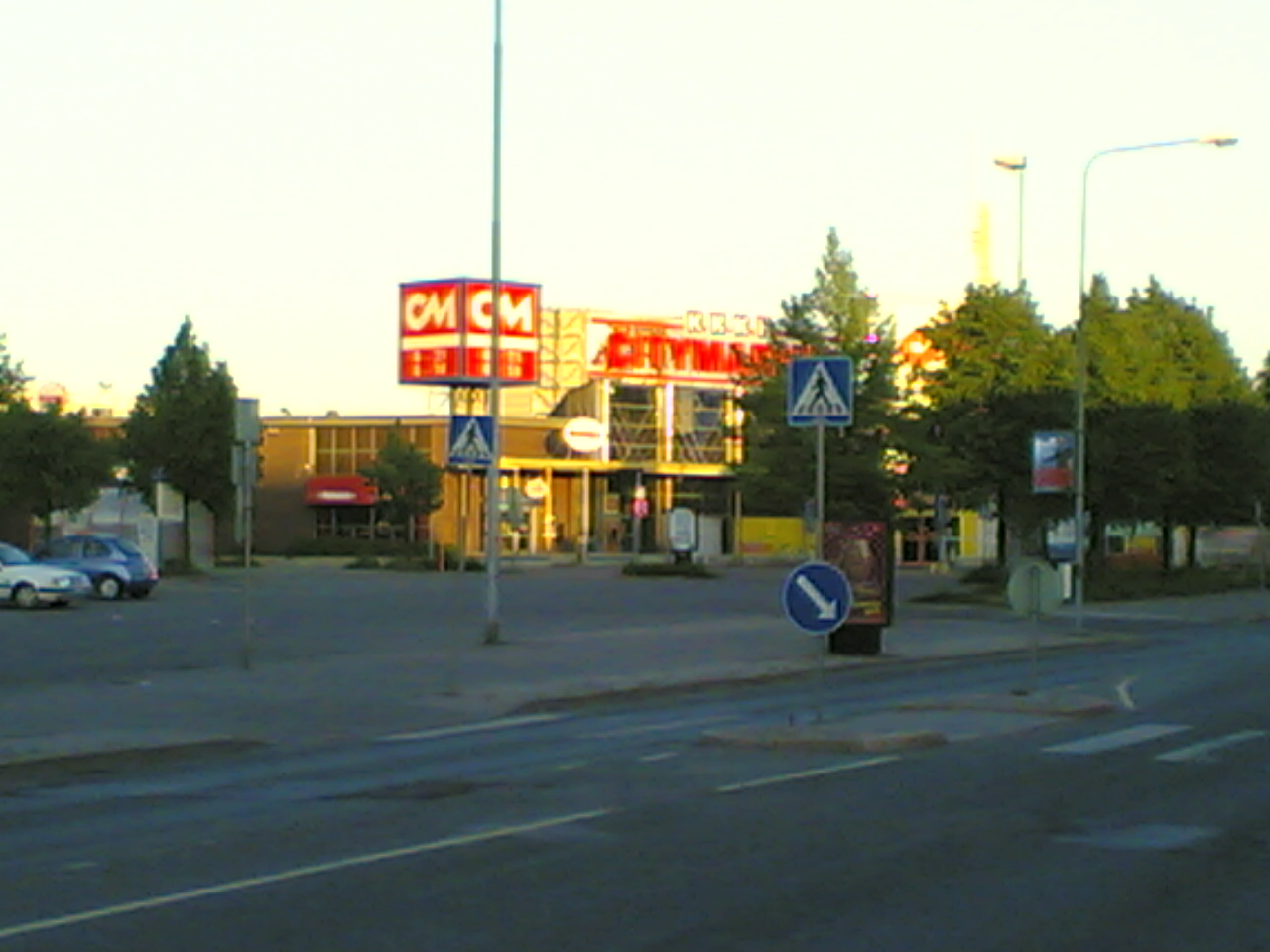
Lahti: Paavola (old)

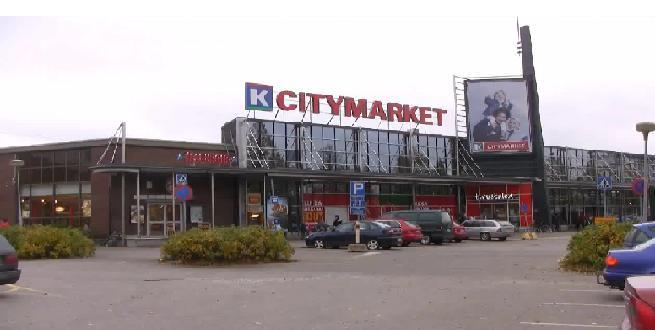
Lahti: Paavola

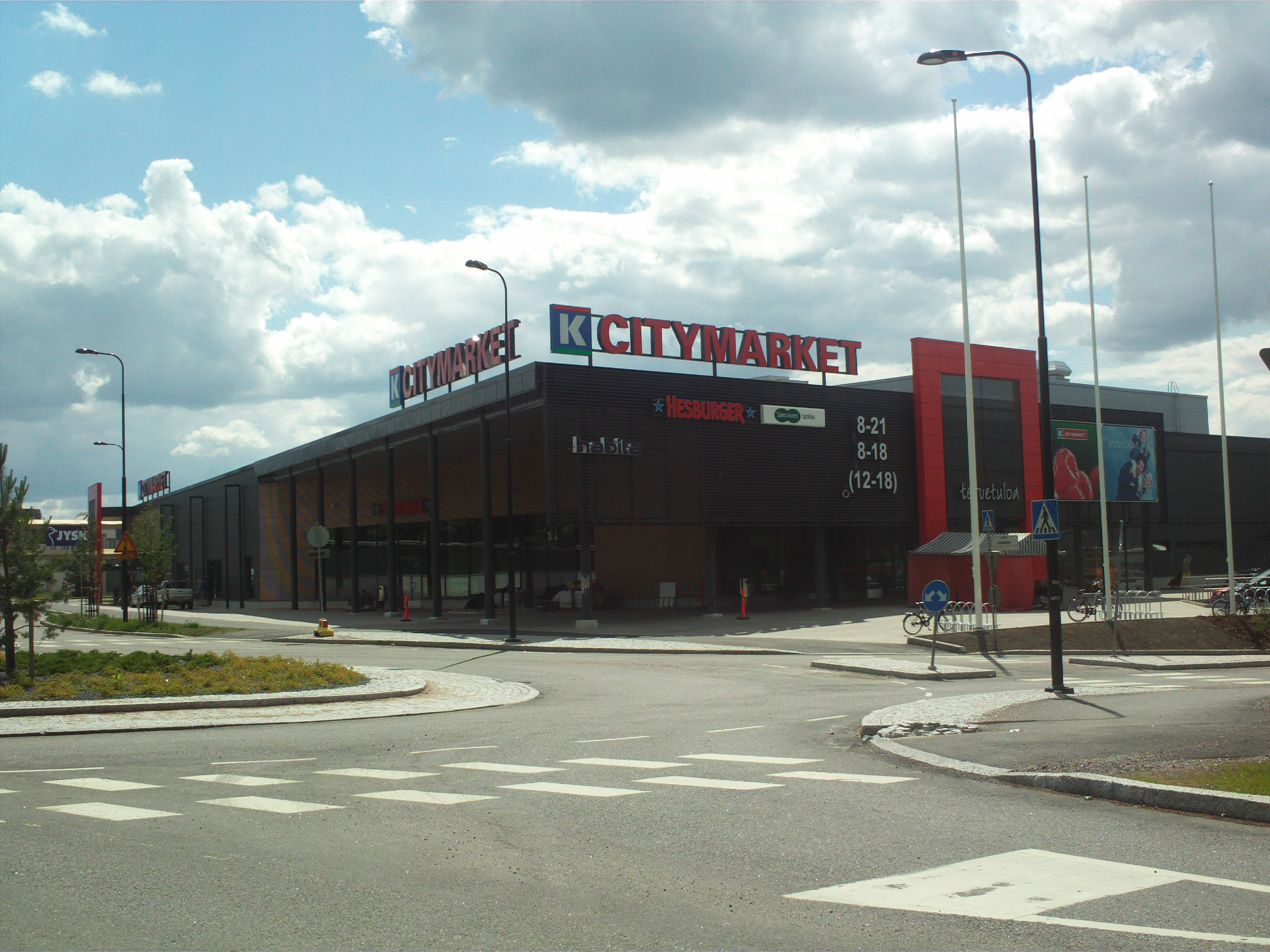
Mäntsälä

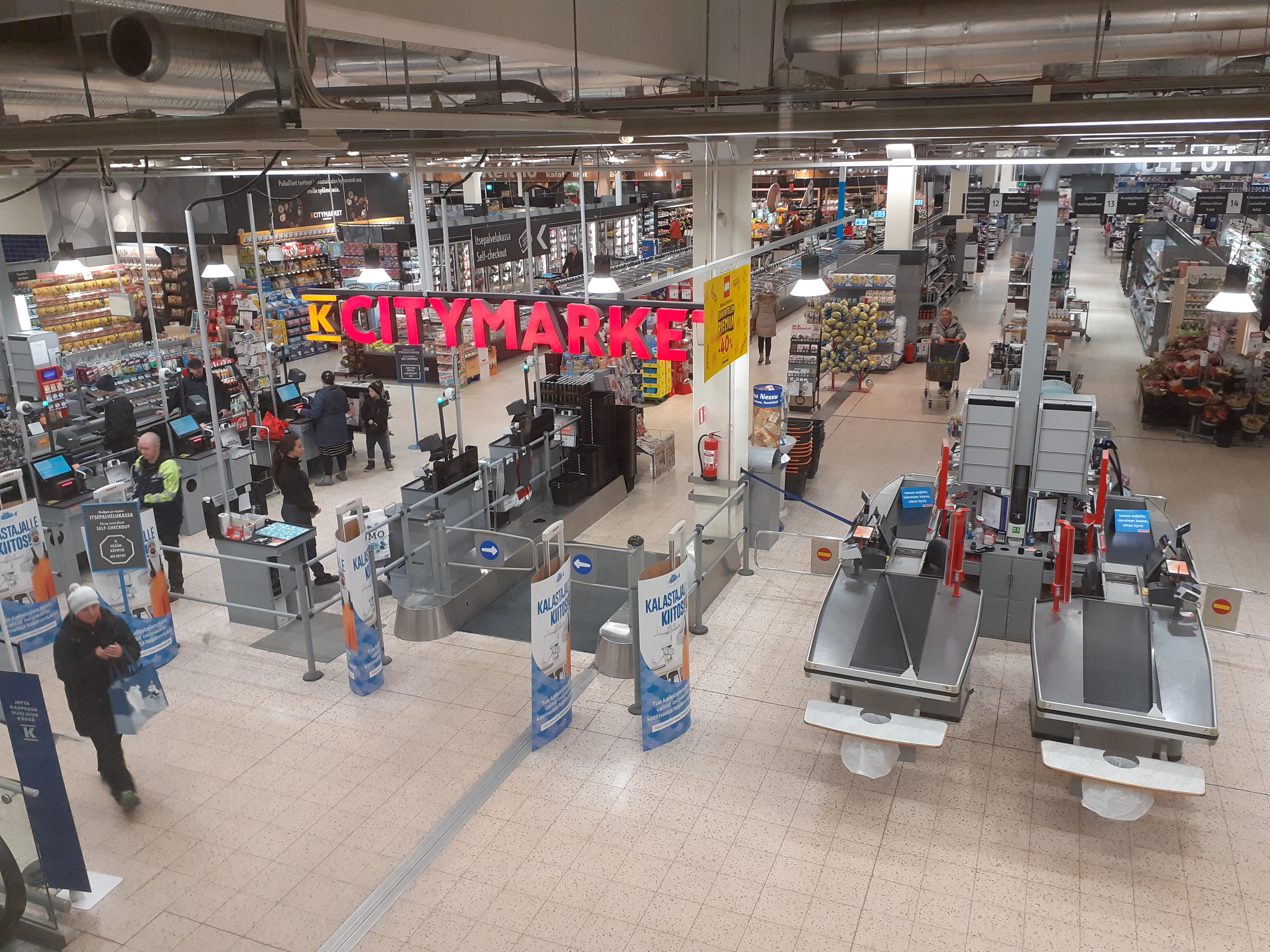
Nurmijärvi: Klaukkala

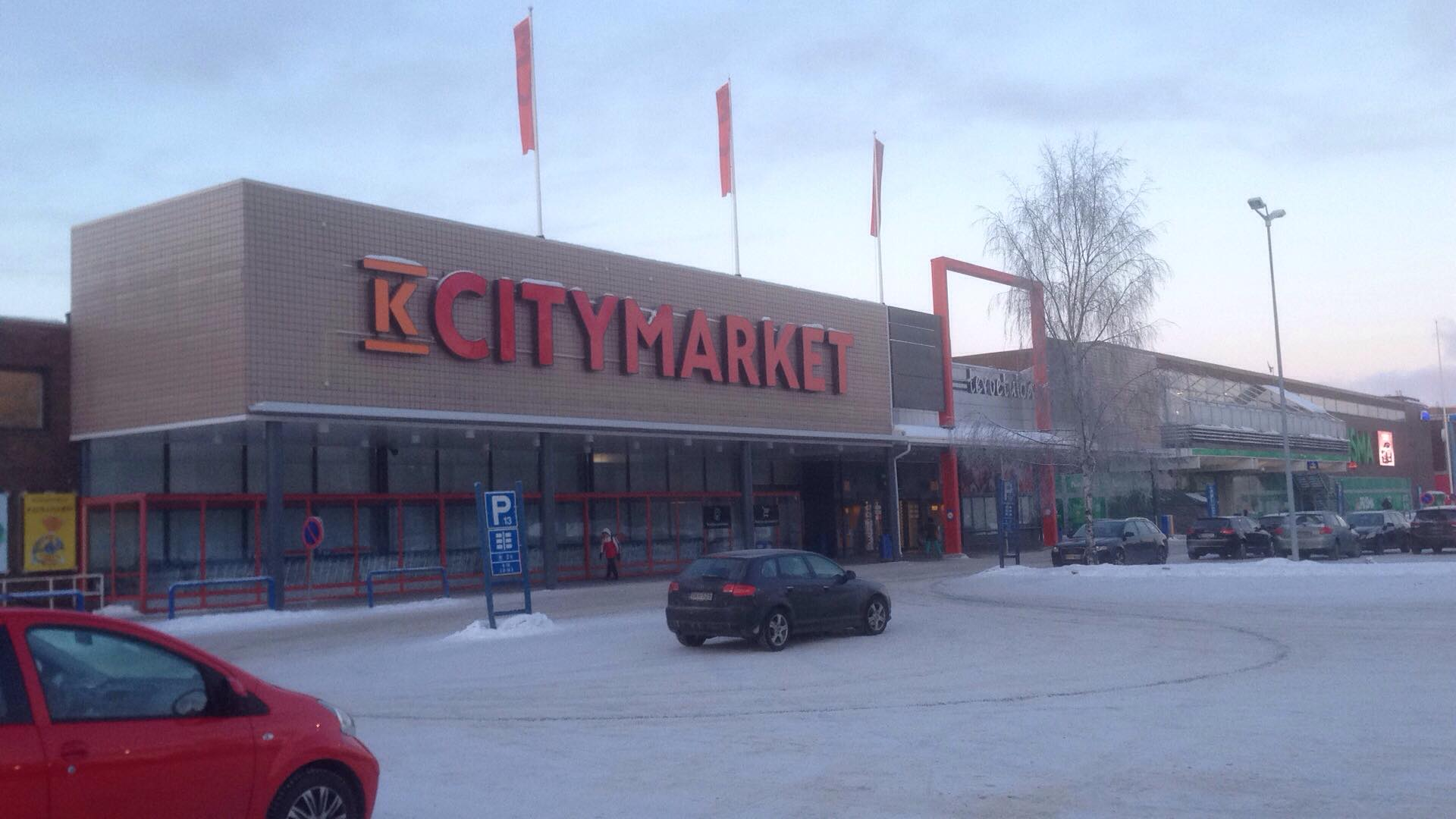
Oulu: Raksila

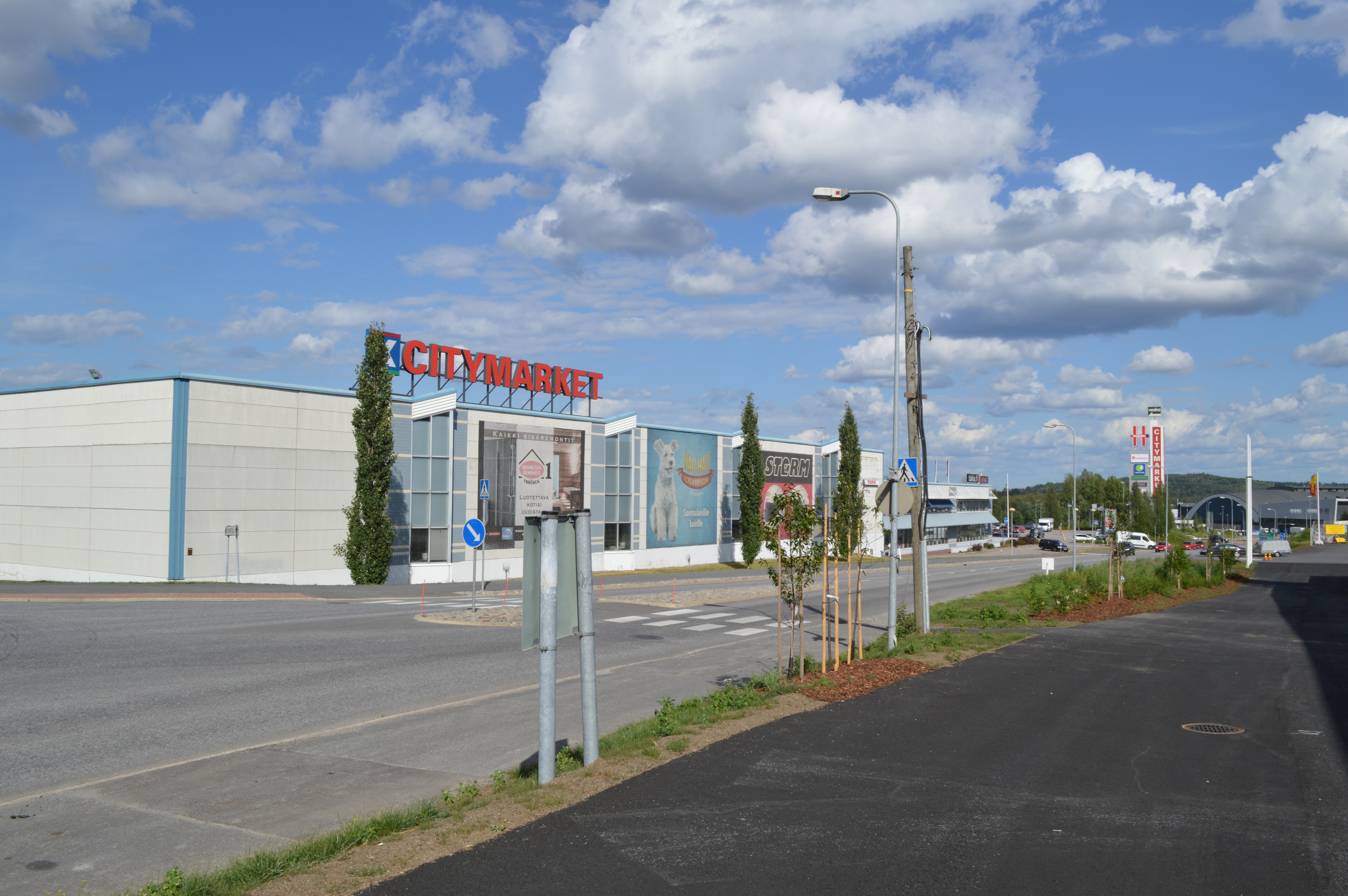
Pirkkala

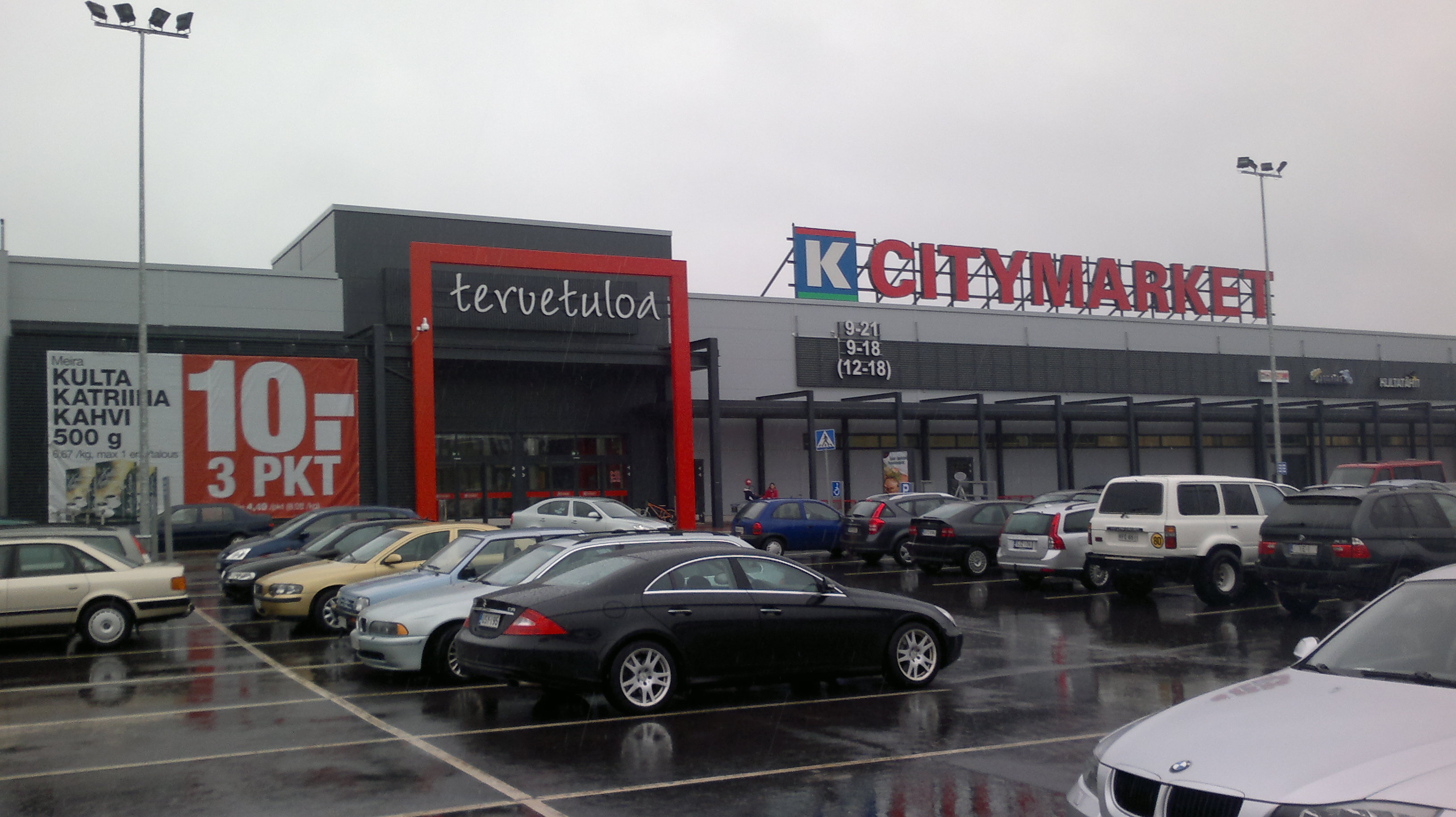
Seinäjoki: Päivölä

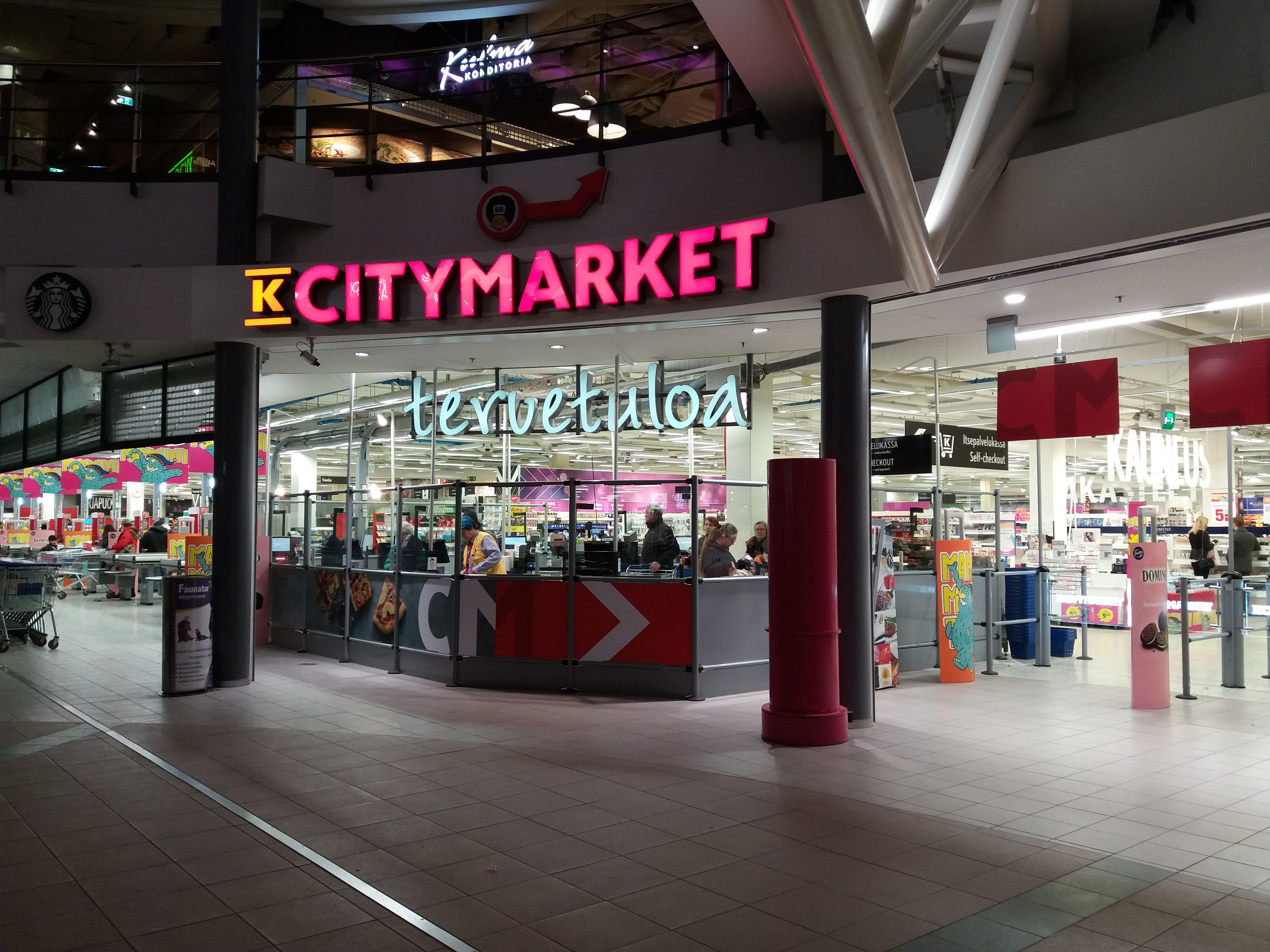
Vantaa: Myyrmäki

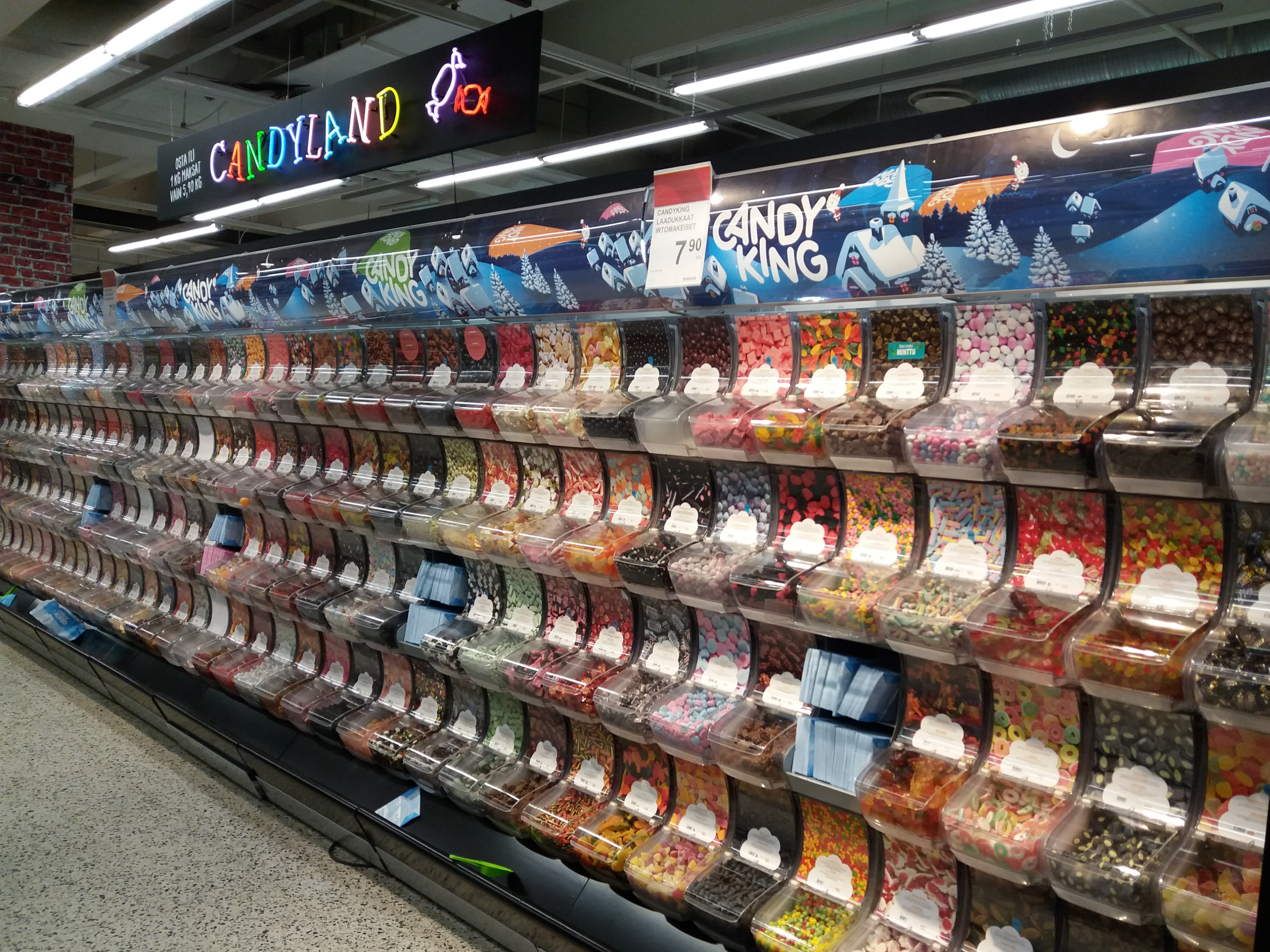
Candy King (Bulk confectionery) in K-Citymarket.

== See also ==
K-Supermarket
