= Karttula =

- Former municipality
- Karttulan kunta Karttula kommun
- Coat of arms

- Location of Karttula in Finland
- Coordinates: 62°53.8′N 026°58′E
- Country: Finland
- Region: North Savo
- Sub-region: Kuopio sub-region
- Charter: 1873
- Consolidated: 2011

Government
  - Municipal manager: Matti Raatikainen

Area
  - Total: 588.75 km^{2} (227.32 sq mi)
  - Land: 473.38 km^{2} (182.77 sq mi)
  - Water: 115.37 km^{2} (44.54 sq mi)

Population (31 October 2010)
  - Total: 3,483
  - Density: 7.358/km^{2} (19.06/sq mi)

Population by native language
  - Finnish: 99.1% (official)
  - Swedish: 0.1%
  - Others: 0.8%

Population by age
  - 0 to 14: 20.0%
  - 15 to 64: 63.2%
  - 65 or older: 16.8%
- Time zone: UTC+2 (EET)
  - Summer (DST): UTC+3 (EEST)
- Website: www.karttula.fi

Karttula (Finnish pronunciation: [ˈkɑrtːulɑ]) is a former municipality of Finland. It was consolidated with the city of Kuopio on 1 January 2011.

The municipality was located in the North Savo region. It had a population of 3,483 (31 October 2010) and covered a land area of 473.38 square kilometres (182.77 sq mi). The population density was 7.36 inhabitants per square kilometre (19.1/sq mi). The municipality was unilingually Finnish.

Karttula was consolidated with the city of Kuopio in 2011. Kuopio retained its name and coat of arms.

In the 1980s, each Savonian municipality voted for its own signature dish. Karttula's traditional dish was mykysoppa, a variation of Upper Savo's mykyrokka. Other local dishes include blueberry gruel and sap.

== History ==
Karttula was first mentioned in the 1620s, when it was a part of the Tavinsalmi (later Kuopio) parish. Its name is derived from the surname Karttunen. It was granted a chapel in 1769 and became its own parish in 1862.

== See also ==
- Finnish regional road 551
- Syvänniemi – a village in the former municipality
