= M-Market =

Finnish grocery store chain

M Itsenäiset Kauppiaat Oy
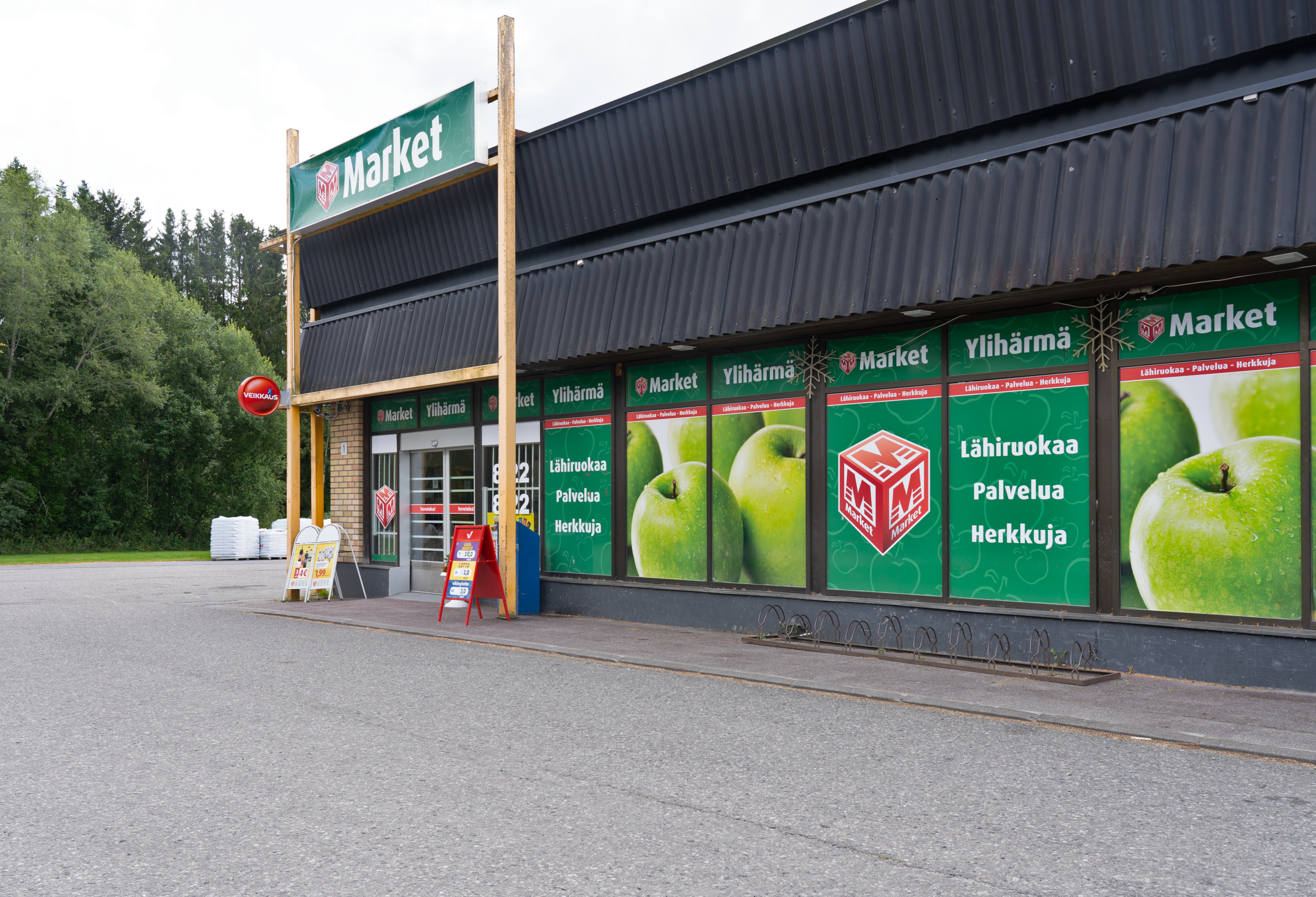
- M-Market in Ylihärmä, Kauhava.
- Company type: Joint-stock company (Oy)
- Founded: 2006
- Headquarters: Hyvinkää, Finland
- Number of locations: 50
- Area served: Finland
- Key people: Marko Valkama; Chairman
- Products: Retail
- Website: www.m-ketju.fi

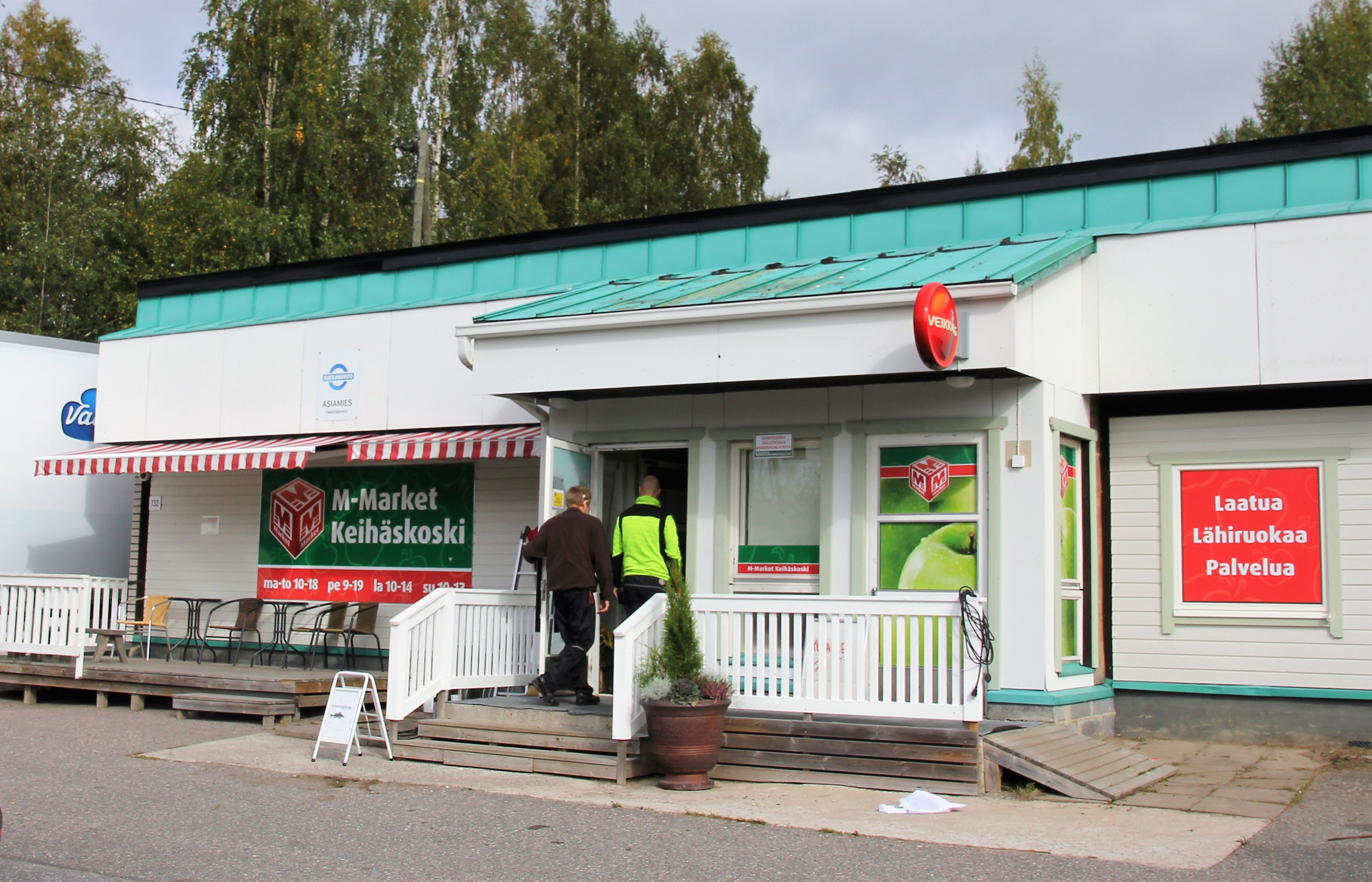
M-Market Keihäskoski in Syvänniemi, Kuopio.

M-Market (Finnish: M-ketju; lit. M-chain) is a Finnish grocery store chain. The chain was founded by independent retailers in 2006, which was created as a result of cooperation between retailers who opposed the sale of Spar Finland to SOK and resigned from the chain.

The M-chain's grocery sales (incl. consumer goods) were approximately EUR 98 million in 2015, when the chain's market share of the Finnish grocery trade was estimated at a total of 0.6%. As of 2024, M-Market operates 53 stores across Finland, with a reported annual sales value of EUR 59.6 million, corresponding to about 0.3% of the Finnish grocery market, a notable reduction since 2015.

The M-chain's stores are approximately 200–2,500 m^{2} in size. The M-chain's main logistics partner is Wihuri Oy (formerly Tuko Logistics until 2018), and has its own supplier agreements with about a hundred partners. All individual stores of the M-chain are also grouped under an umbrella marketing organisation called M Itsenäiset Kauppiaat Oy.

The first M-Market stores opened their doors at the beginning of 2006, when 16 stores joined the chain. At the beginning of 2007, the chain already had 50 stores. When the Siwa chain's stores were sold in 2017, 14 new stores were added to the M-chain. Today, the chain has about 50 stores.
