= Kuopion maalaiskunta =

Former municipality of Finland

Kuopion maalaiskunta was a municipality in eastern Finland in Kuopio Province. The municipality was disbanded in early 1969. Most of the area of Kuopion maalaiskunta was connected to the city of Kuopio, but two villages of Kuopion maalaiskunta, Kehvo and Väänälänranta, were connected to Siilinjärvi. There were 8,496 inhabitants in Kuopion maalaiskunta at the last census.

== Well-known people from Kuopion maalaiskunta ==
- Martti Välikangas, architect
- Ferdinand, Magnus and Wilhelm von Wright, artist brothers.
