= Von Wright brothers =

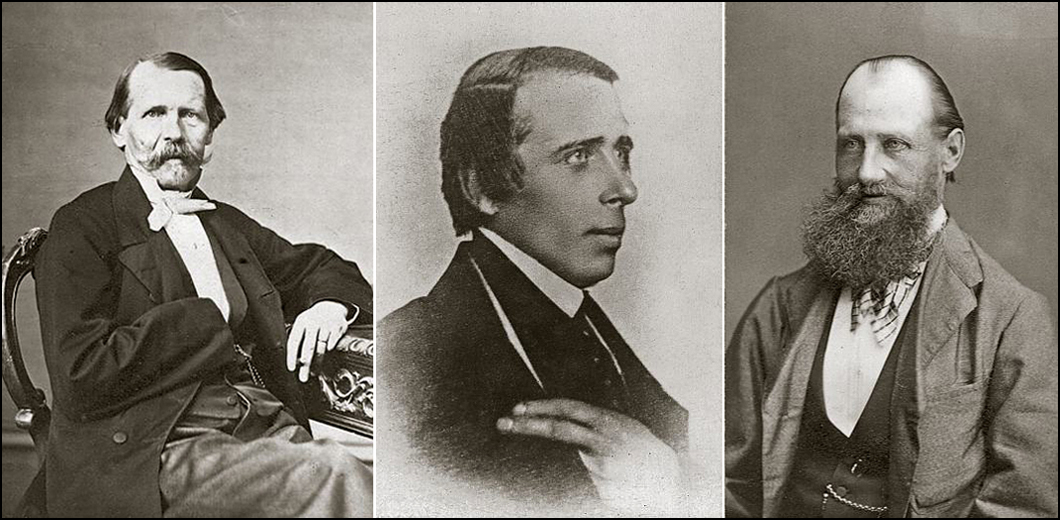
Von Wright brothers, Magnus, Wilhelm and Ferdinand.

The von Wright brothers were five Finnish brothers of whom three were noted artists - Magnus von Wright (1805–1868), Wilhelm von Wright (1810–1887) and Ferdinand von Wright (1822–1906). These ornithologists, scientists, nature illustrators and artists were born in Haminalahti near Kuopio in Finland. Magnus and Wilhelm von Wright began the illustrative work Svenska Fåglar ("Swedish birds") in August 1828. The work was financed by count Nils Bonde. The works was ready by 1838 and contains 178 lithographs.

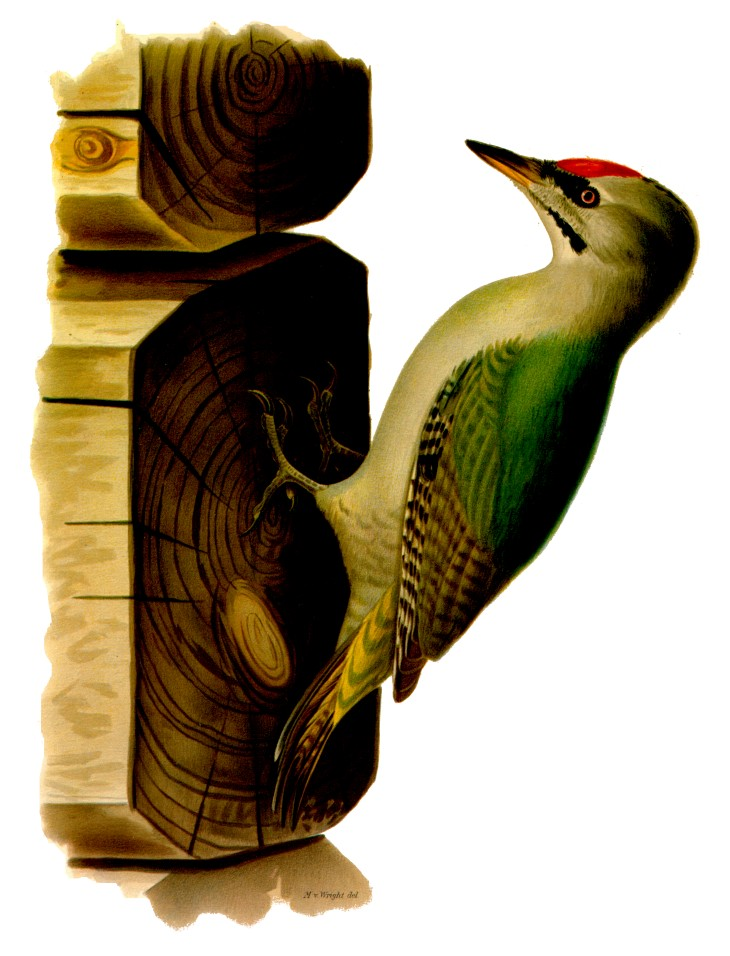
Grey-headed woodpecker by Magnus von Wright

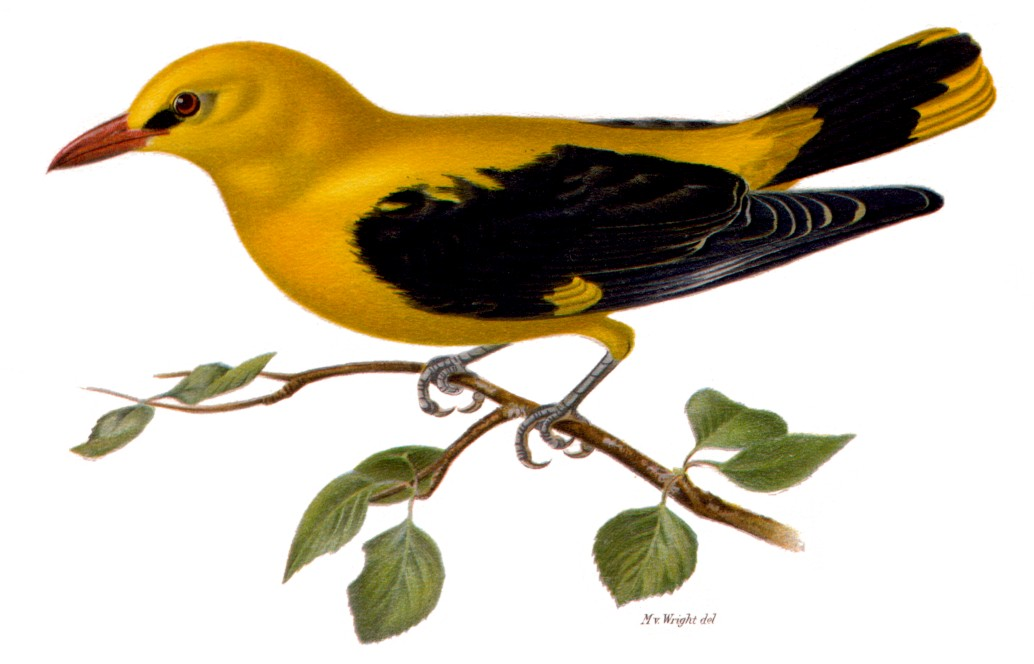
Eurasian golden oriole by Magnus von Wright

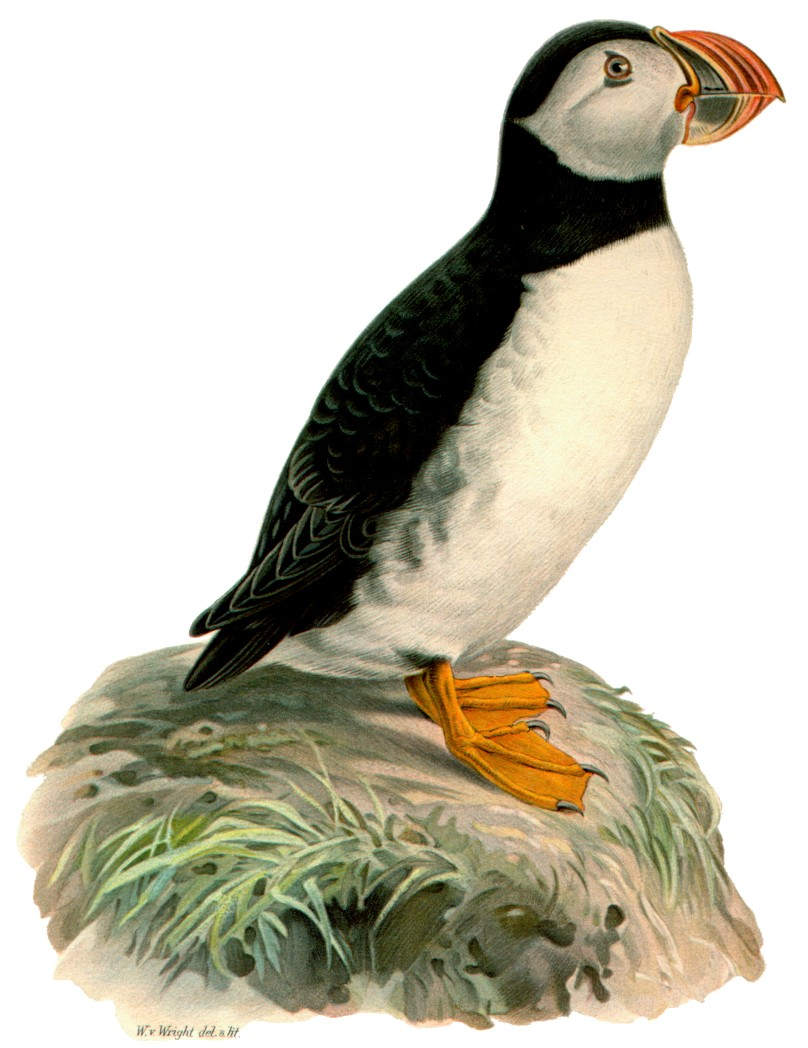
Atlantic puffin by Wilhelm von Wright

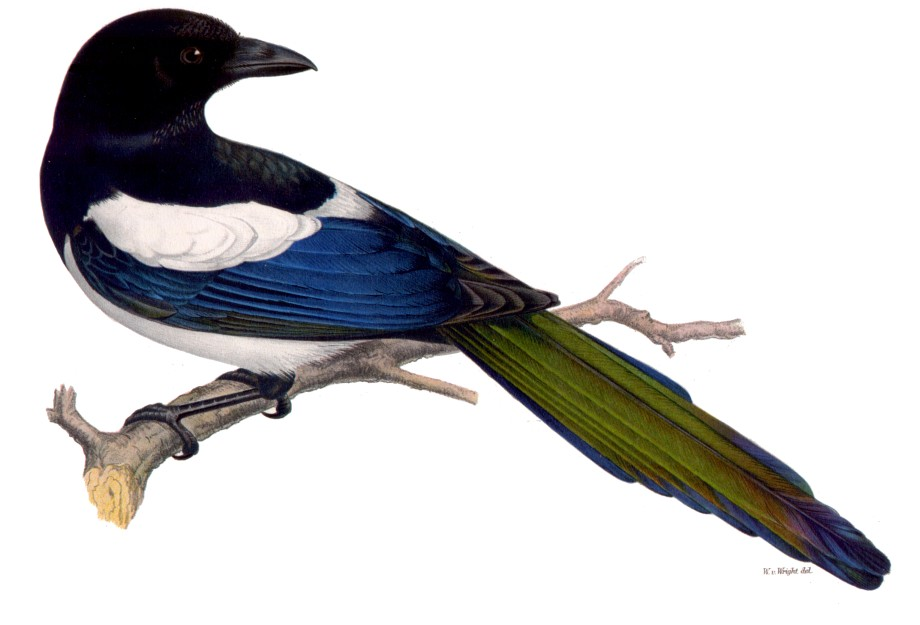
Eurasian magpie by Wilhelm von Wright

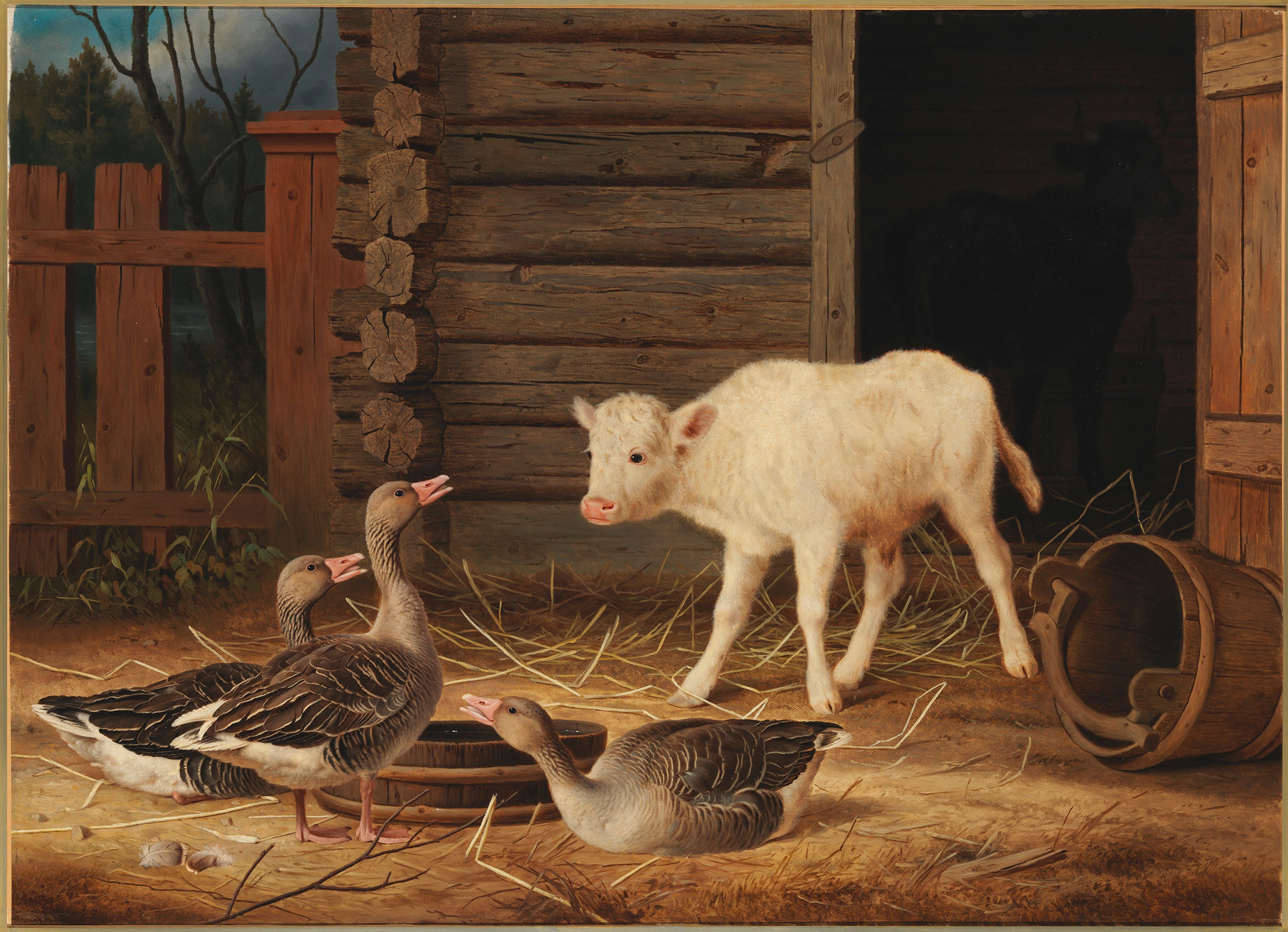
The first surprise by Ferdinand von Wright

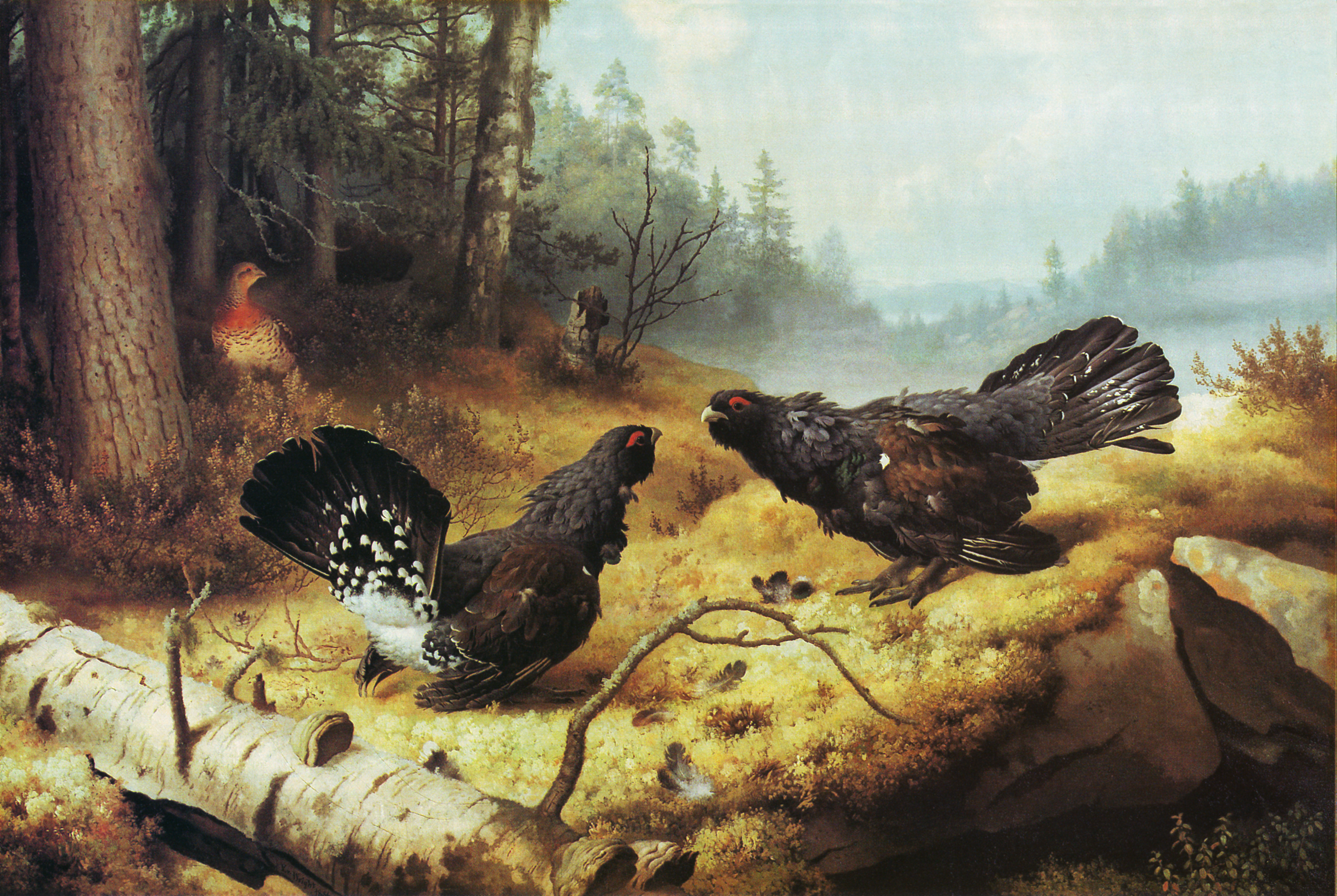
Western capercaillie by Ferdinand von Wright

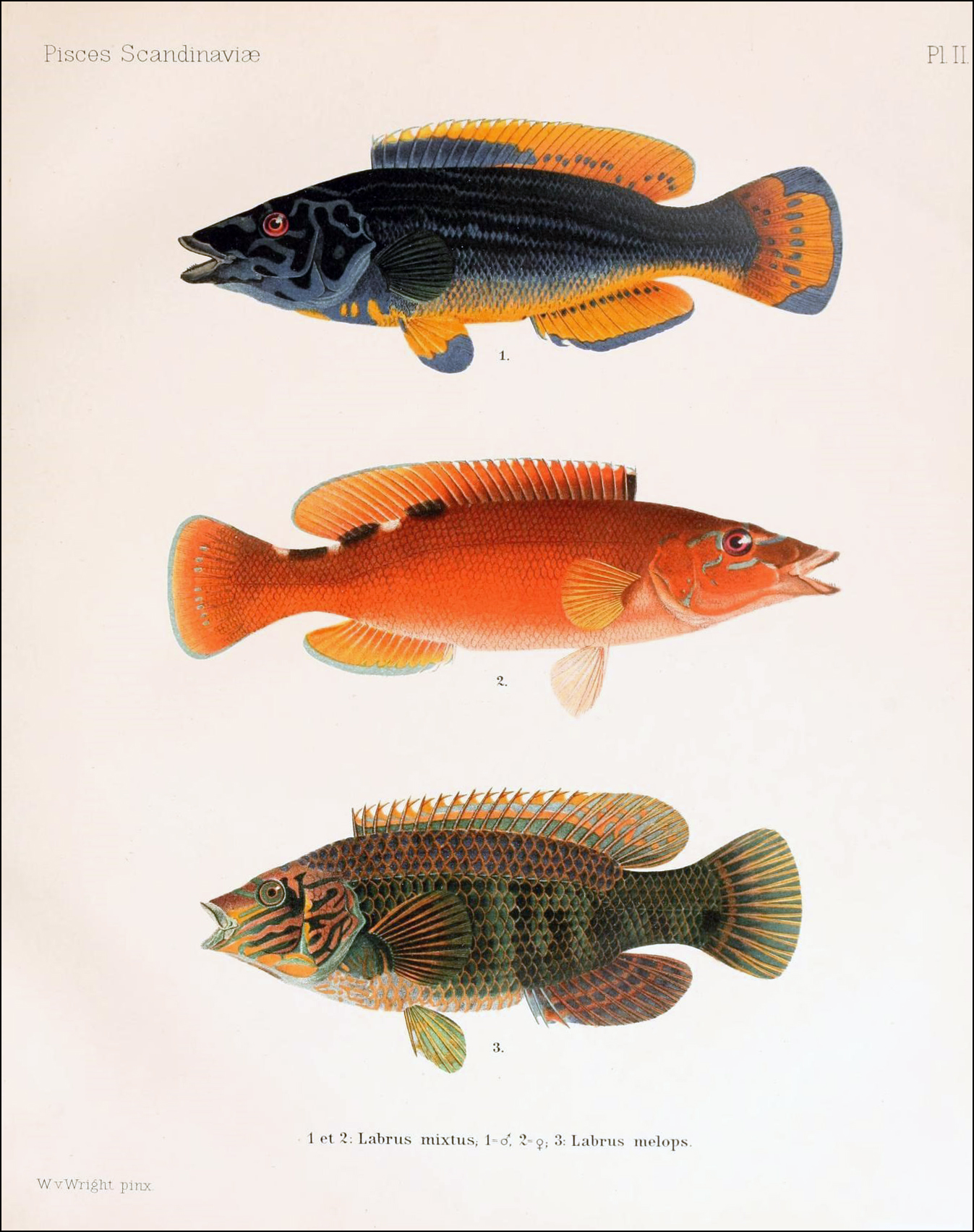
Cuckoo wrasse by Wilhelm von Wright

== See also ==
- Von Wright
