= Von Wright =

von Wright
- Swedish and Finnish noble family
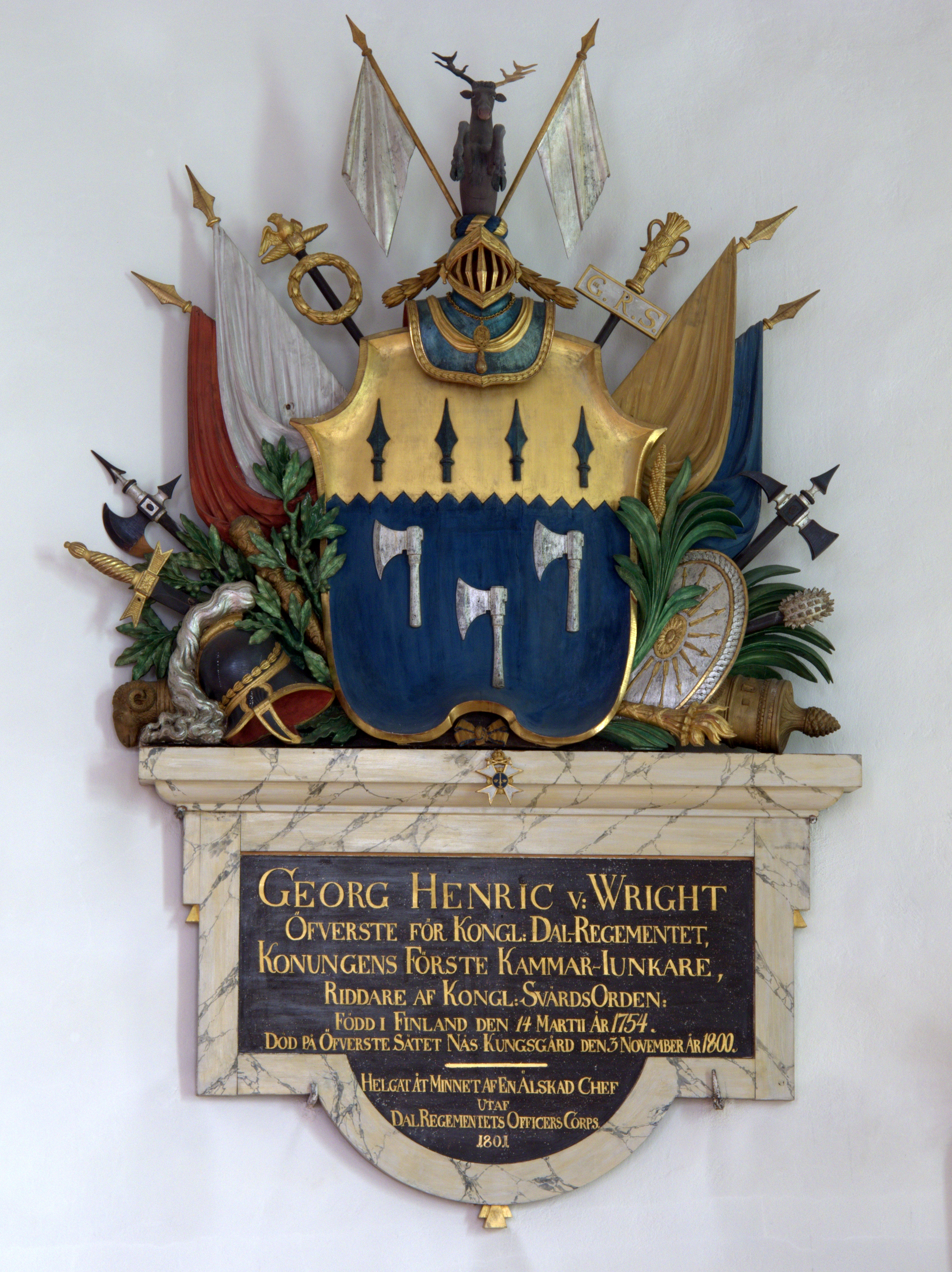
- Epitaphium for Georg Henrik von Wright in Husby Church
- Country: Finland and Sweden
- Current region: Northern Europe
- Origin: Scotland

The von Wright family (Swedish pronunciation: [fɔnˈvrɪkt]) is a Swedish and Finnish noble family founded by the Scotsman George Wright, who emigrated from Dundee to Narva in Swedish-ruled Estonia, in the mid-17th century, Wright's grandsons (and their descendants) by his son Henrik would acquire the nobiliary particle von Wright.

== Notable members ==
- Von Wright brothers, scientists, nature illustrators and artists
  - Magnus von Wright (1805–1868)
  - Wilhelm von Wright (1810–1887)
  - Ferdinand von Wright (1822–1906)
- Georg Henrik von Wright (1916 – 2003), philosopher
- Moira von Wright (born 1957), academic
