= Moira von Wright =

Finnish and Swedish academic (born 1957)

Rector of Södertörn University
- In office 2010–2016

Rector of Åbo Akademi University
- In office 2019–2021

Personal details
- Born: 23 December 1957 (age 68)
- Occupation: academic

Moira Johanna von Wright (born 23 December 1957) is a Finnish and Swedish academic, who was the rector of first Södertörn University 2010–2016 and Åbo Akademi University between August 2019 and October 2021.

== Career ==
Von Wright was born in Helsinki, Finland, and grew up in Turku, Finland.

Professor of Pedagogy (from 2007) and Pro-Rector (from 2008) of Örebro University. She has been a visiting professor at the University of Oslo for two years and a visiting fellow at Cambridge University

In 2010–2016, she was rector of Södertörn University College. Her tenure proved controversial and she was openly criticised for an authoritarian leadership style.

Von Wright was appointed rector at Åbo Akademi University in 2019. At its meeting in Vaasa on 1 November 2021, the Board of Åbo Akademi University decided to dismiss Rector Moira von Wright, citing a crisis of confidence between the rector and the rest of the university due to a perceived lack of transparency and insufficient communication, as well as differing views regarding the leadership and future development of Åbo Akademi.

She belongs to the noble von Wright family.
