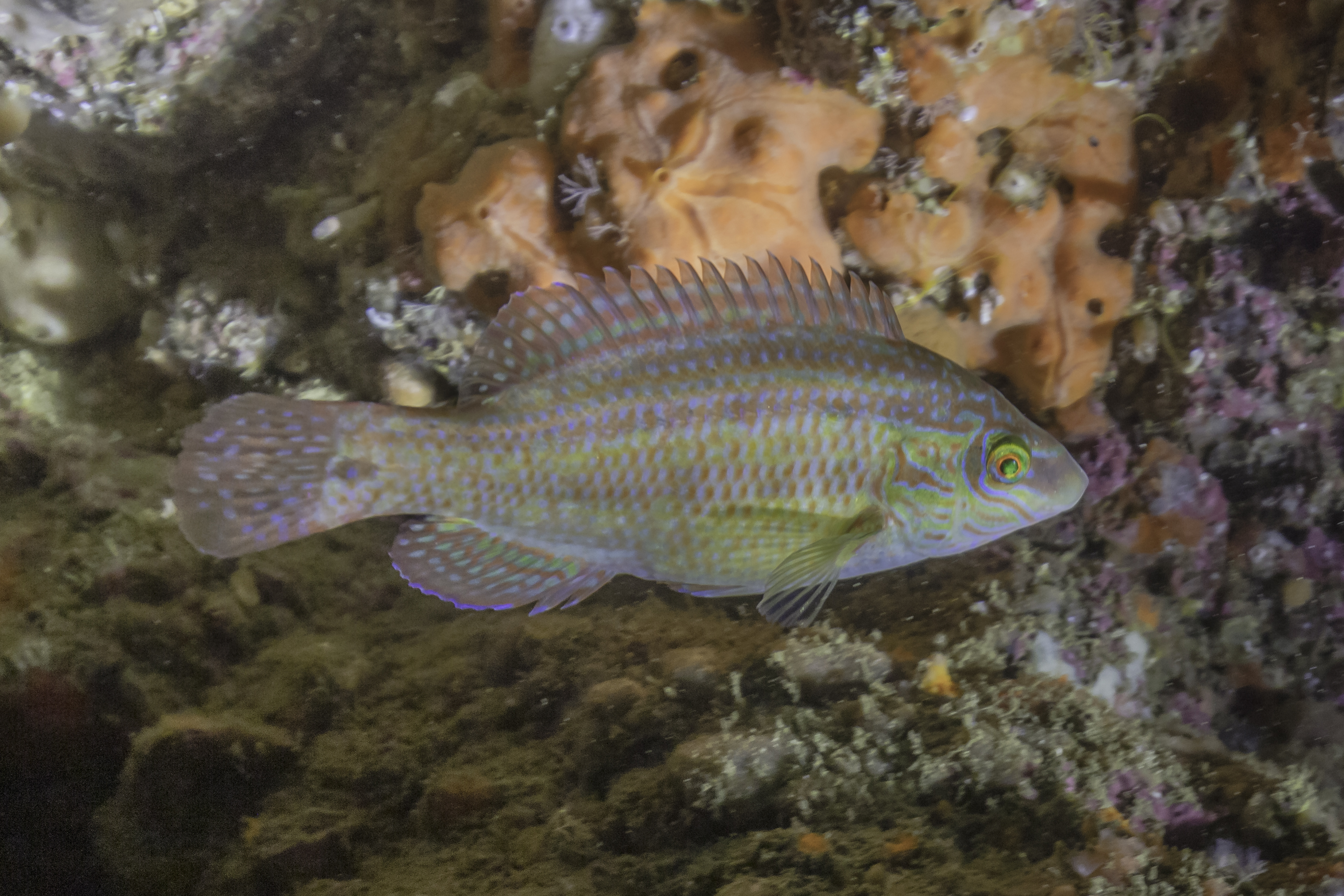

Conservation status
- Least Concern (IUCN 3.1)

Scientific classification
- Kingdom: Animalia
- Phylum: Chordata
- Class: Actinopterygii
- Division: Teleostei
- Order: Labriformes
- Family: Labridae
- Genus: Symphodus
- Species: S. melops

Binomial name
- Symphodus melops (Linnaeus, 1758)

Synonyms
- List: Labrus melops Linnaeus, 1758; Crenilabrus melops (Linnaeus, 1758); Lutjanus melops (Linnaeus, 1758); Labrus rone Ascanius, 1772; Labrus goldsinny Bonnaterre, 1788; Labrus gibbosus Bonnaterre, 1788; Labrus venosus J. F. Gmelin, 1789; Labrus gibbus J. F. Gmelin, 1789; Crenilabrus gibbus (J. F. Gmelin, 1789); Labrus cornubius J. F. Gmelin, 1789; Lutjanus norvegicus Bloch, 1791; Labrus tesselatus Bloch, 1792

= Corkwing wrasse =

Species of fish

The corkwing wrasse (Symphodus melops) is a species of wrasse native to the eastern Atlantic Ocean from Norway to Morocco and out to the Azores, as well as being found in the Mediterranean Sea and the Adriatic Sea. This species can be found in areas of rock or eelgrass at depths from 1 to 30 m (3.3 to 98.4 ft).

== Description ==
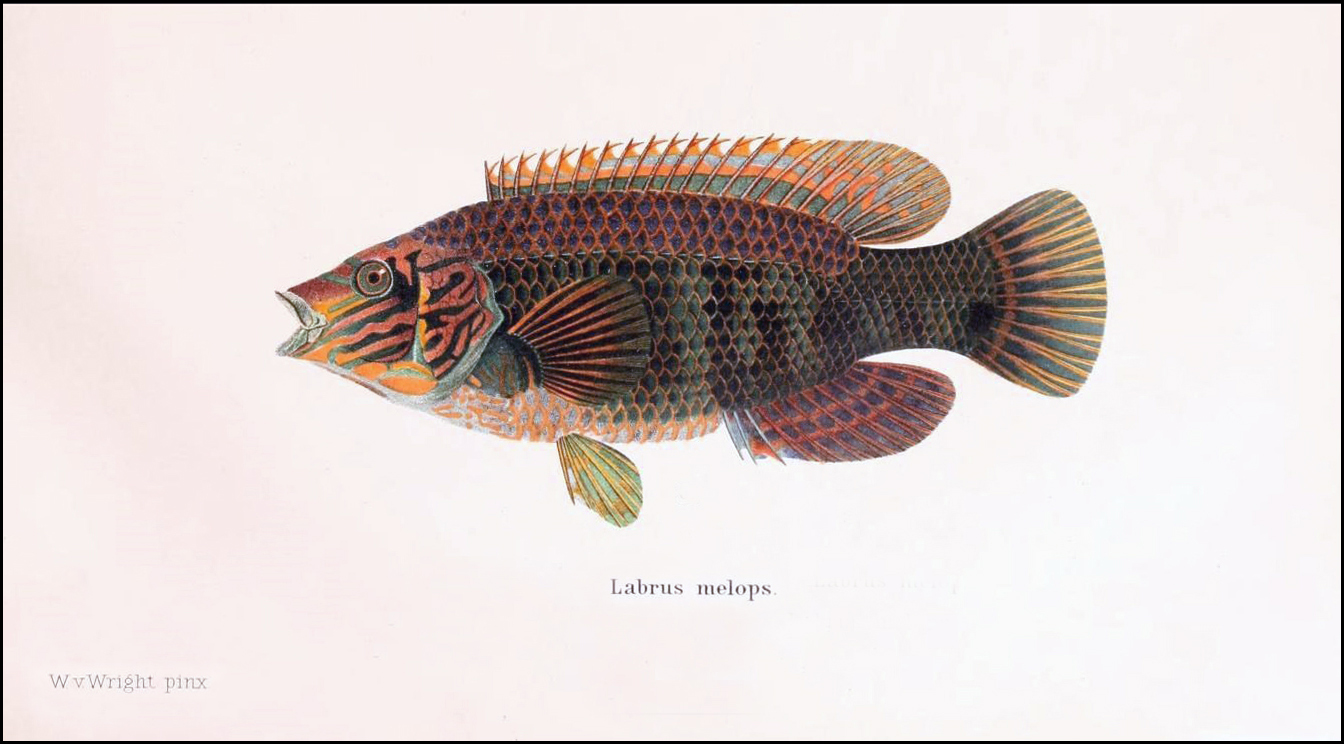
Corkwing wrasse by Wilhelm von Wright.

Its body is deep and compressed sideways, with a single, long dorsal fin. It is usually about 15 cm (5.9 in) long, but has reached 25 cm (9.8 in).

It is highly variable in colour, depending on the environment and age of the fish. The corkwing wrasse has a black spot in the middle of the tail stalk, and a comma-shaped spot behind the eye. Females and juveniles tend to be brown or greenish-brown, while the males are typically more brightly coloured. Both sexes have lines on their heads and gill covers which are brown and pale blue in the female, and bright green or blue in the male.

It feeds on a large variety of prey, but mainly bivalves and copepods.

== Reproduction ==
The males exhibit dimorphism, where the territorial males build a ball-shaped nest of seaweed in rock crevices or sedimentary areas, amongst seaweed or seagrasses. The nest has an entrance hole which the male guards aggressively. The other morph mimics the females and tries to sneak-fertilize. The sneakers are much smaller than the territorial males, and cannot be visually distinguished from females. As there is a trade-off between reproductive investment and growth, the sneakers have much larger gonads related to body size than the territorial males. Their sperm quality is also shown to be better for the sneaker, as it is longer-lived. About 5 – 20% of the males in a population tend to be sneakers.

== Importance ==
The fish has been commercially used since 1988 because of its ability to remove parasites from other fish. It is today heavily fished and one may say exploited for the use in aquaculture to remove salmon louse (Lepeophtheirus salmonis).
