= Wilhelm von Wright =

Finnish painter (1810–1887)

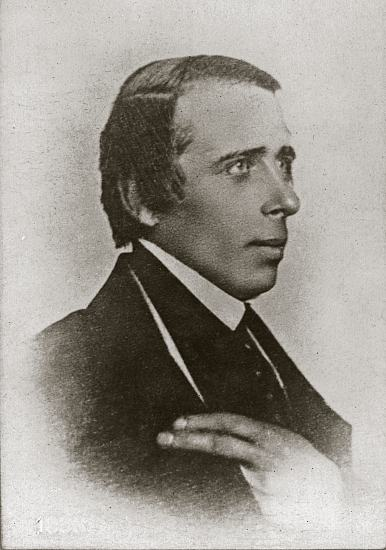
Wilhelm von Wright (date unknown).

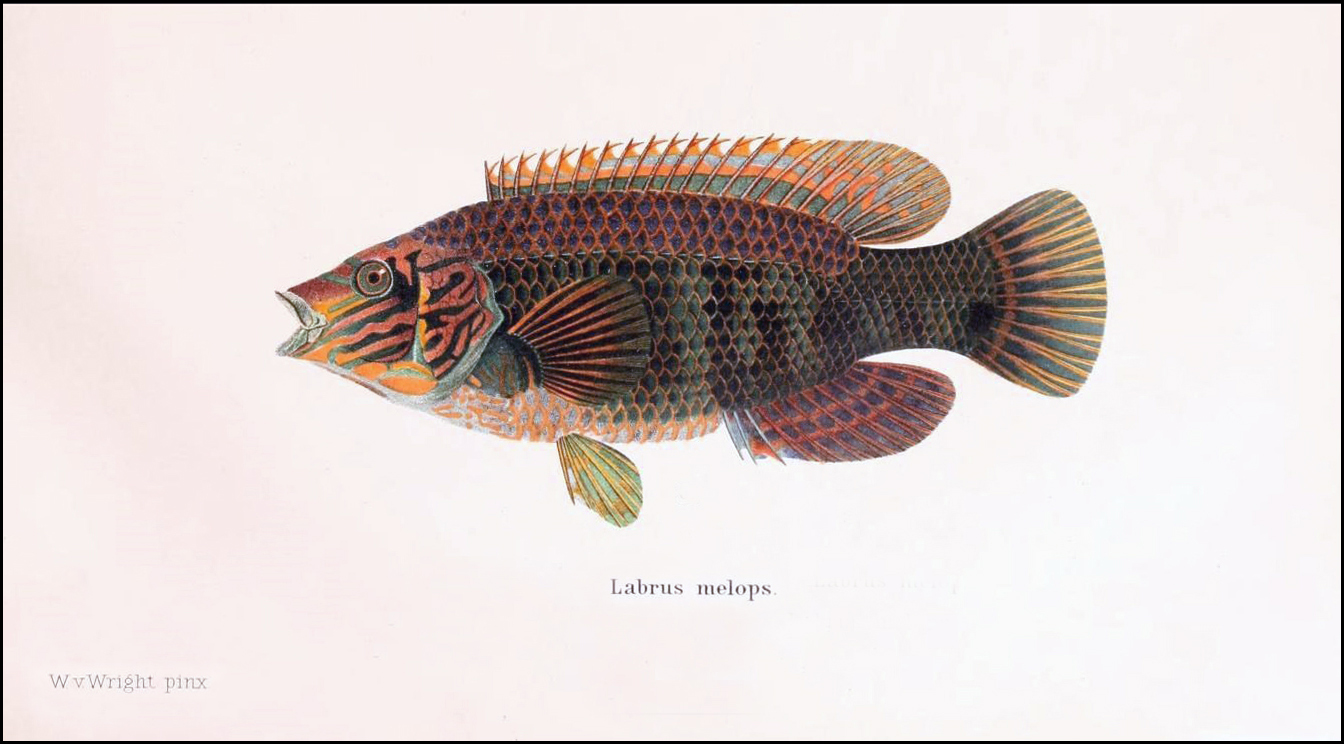
Corkwing wrasse.

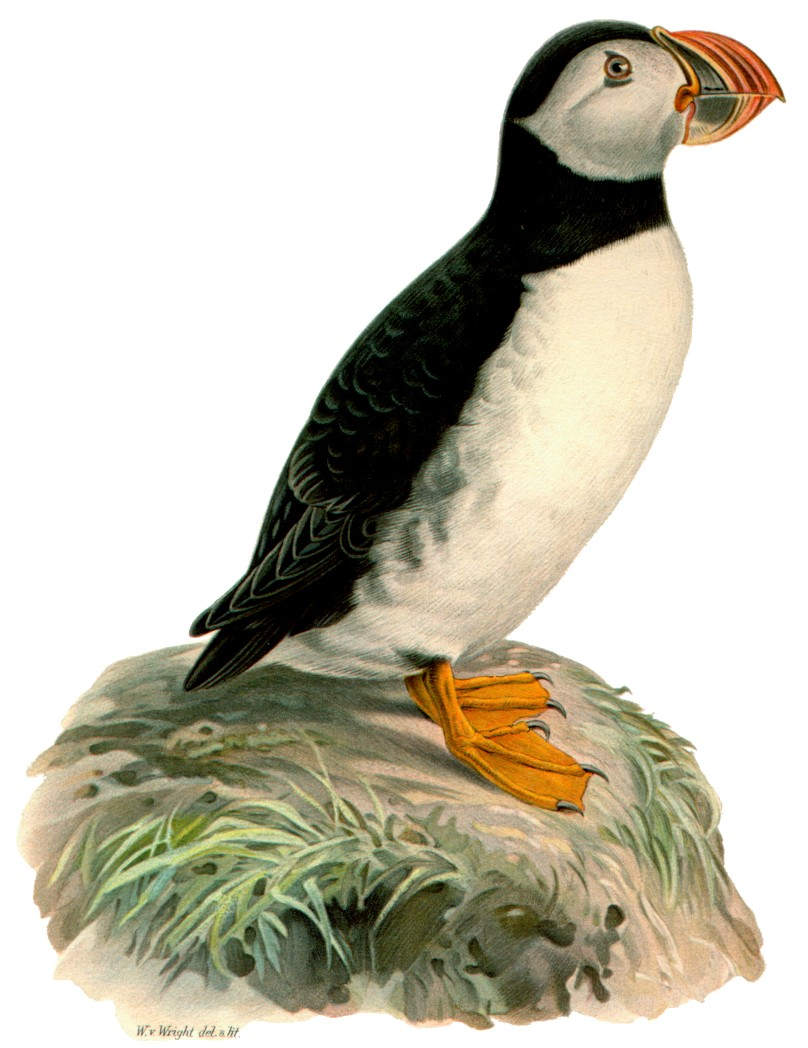
Atlantic puffin.

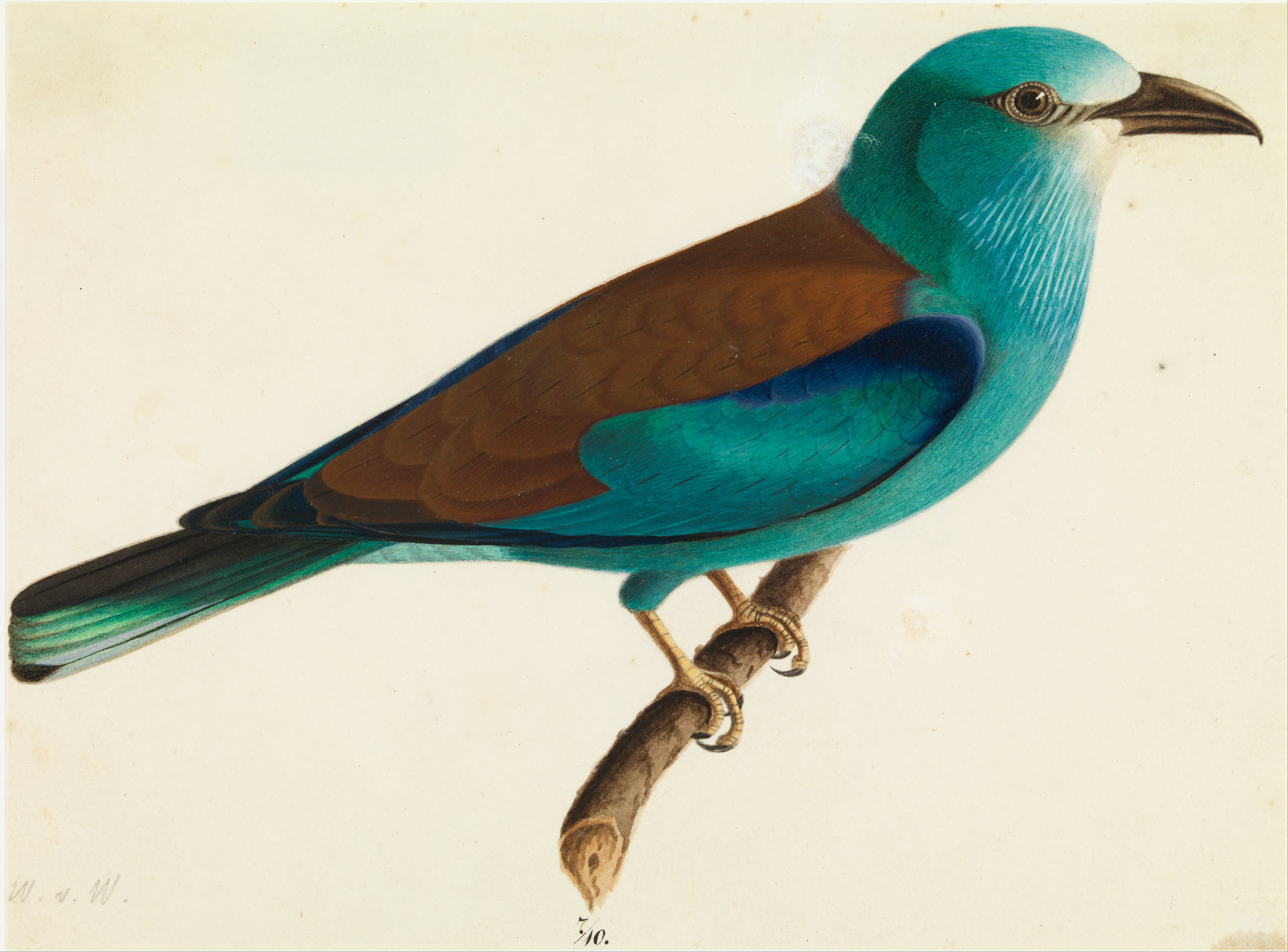
The European roller.

Wilhelm von Wright (5 April 1810 – 2 July 1887) was a Swedish-Finnish painter and amateur naturalist.

== Biography ==
Wilhelm von Wright was born at the village of Haminalahti in Kuopio, Finland. His ancestors included Scottish merchants who had settled in Narva during the 17th-Century. His father Henrik Magnus von Wright was a retired Major who owned the family estate, Haminalahden. Two of his brothers, Magnus von Wright (1805–1868) and Ferdinand von Wright (1822–1906) also became painters and illustrators. At the invitation of Magnus, he travelled to Sweden in 1823, where he participated in producing the multi-volume Svenska Fåglar (Stockholm: C. von Scheele. 1828) for Swedish ornithologist Nils Bonde.

His most important solo effort involved Skandinaviens fiskar (Stockholm: P. A. Norstedt & Söner, 1836–1857) by Bengt Fredrik Fries and Carl Jakob Sundevall, for which he provided 60 color illustrations. He also contributed drawings to the Swedish periodicity Tidskrift för Jagare och Natur Forskaren which was published in Stockholm by the Svenska Jägareförbundet for hunters and naturalists.

In 1833, he became a member of the Stockholm Chamber of Commerce and, two years later, was elected to the Royal Swedish Academy of Arts. After 1836, he lived on the island of Orust in the parish of Morlanda in Bohuslän where he established his residence at Marieberg, Orust. In 1845 he married Maria Margareta Bildt (1816–1884). In 1855, he was appointed as inspector for fisheries in Bohuslän. Not long after, he had a stroke, which left him incapacitated for the rest of his life. After his wife's death in 1884, he suffered a serious decline and died early at Orust in 1887.

== See also ==
- Von Wright
- Von Wright brothers
