= Ferdinand von Wright =

Finnish painter

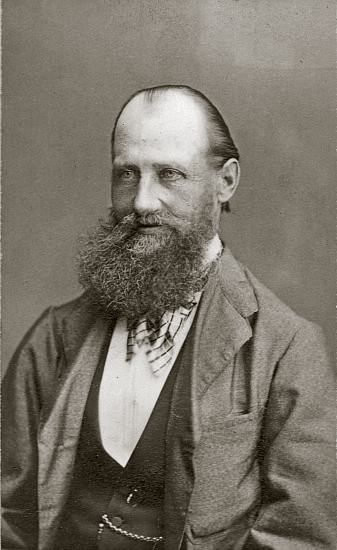
- Ferdinand von Wright, 1880s
- Born: 19 March 1822
- Died: 31 July 1906 (aged 84)
- Known for: Painting

Ferdinand von Wright (19 March 1822, Haminalahti, near Kuopio - 31 July 1906, Kuopio) was a Finnish painter (belonging to Swedish-speaking population of Finland) - He is best known for his landscapes and animal paintings, especially his detailed depictions of birds, but he also created still-lifes and portraits.

== Career ==
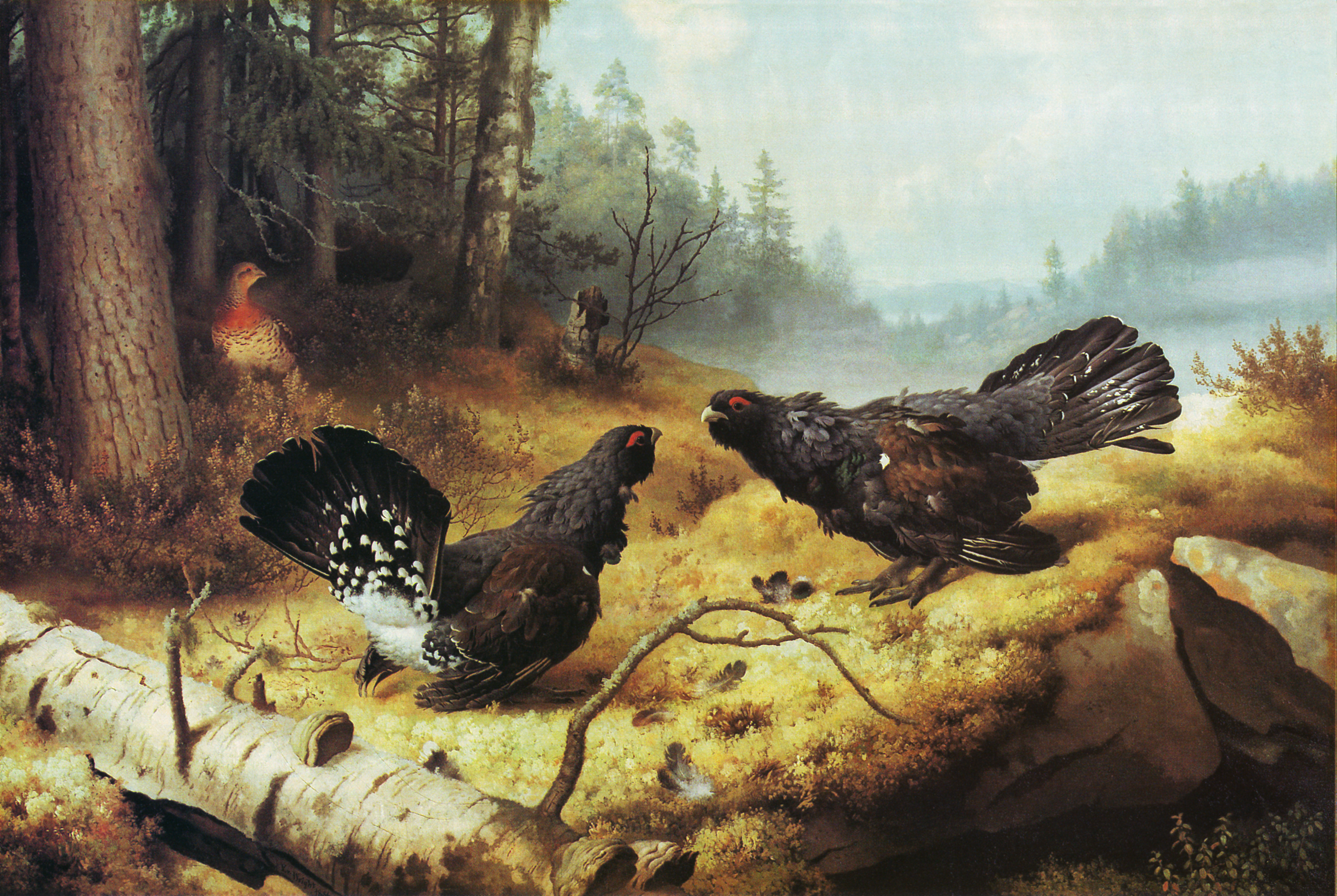
The Fighting Capercaillies, 1886, Finnish National Gallery

Ferdinand von Wright was born at the village of Haminalahti in Kuopio, Finland. His ancestors included Scottish merchants who had settled in Narva during the 17th century. His father Henrik Magnus von Wright was a retired Major who owned the family estate, Haminalahti Manor. He was the youngest of nine surviving children and was tutored at home. Two of his older brothers, Magnus von Wright (1805–1868) and Wilhelm von Wright (1810-1887), also became painters and illustrators. Following in their footsteps, he showed an early aptitude for art, developed during time spent hunting and exploring nature while making sketchbooks.

He travelled to Sweden for the first time when he was fifteen, visiting Bohuslän Province with Wilhelm, who was working as an illustrator for the zoologist Bengt Fredrik Fries (1799-1839).

The following year, he went by himself to work for the Swedish amateur ornithologist, Count Nils Bonde, who had recently subsidized the publication of the multi-volume Svenska Fåglar (Stockholm: C. von Scheele. 1828), with illustrations by Magnus and Wilhelm.

After a few months back in Finland, he returned to Sweden where, in 1842, he briefly studied at the Royal Swedish Academy of Arts with the sculptor Johan Niclas Byström (1783–1848). He went home again in 1844, having been in Sweden for almost six years. Five years later, he went to Turku, where he took some additional lessons from Robert Wilhelm Ekman (1808-1873).

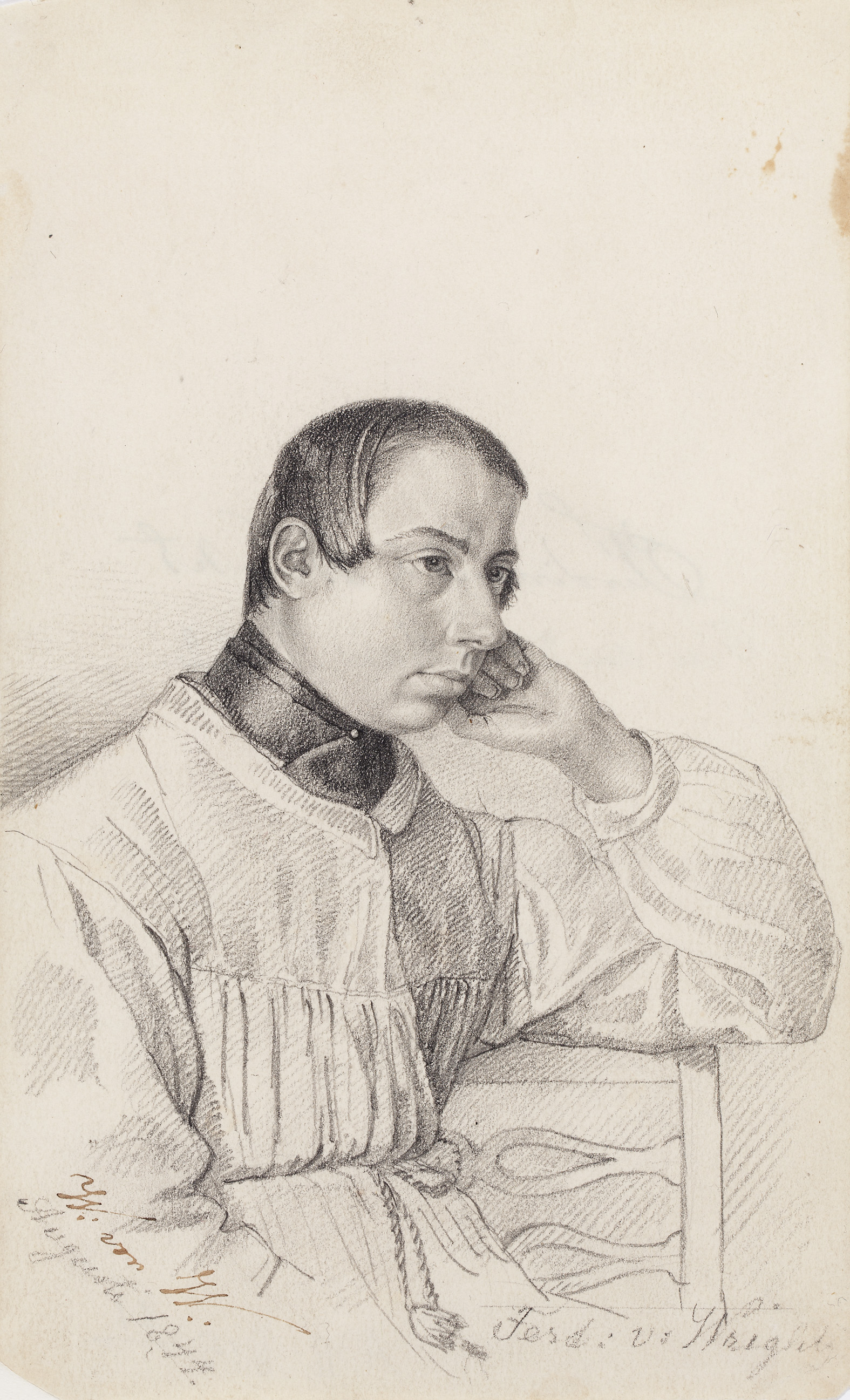
Ferdinand von Wright, the artist's brother, Wilhelm von Wright, 1844

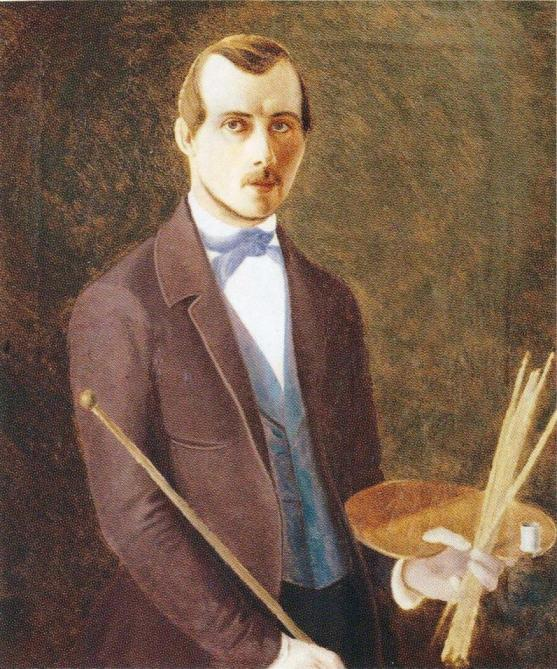
Self-portrait, 1849-1852

In 1852, he and his brothers went to Helsinki, where he set up a studio and began painting more detailed scenes, rather than individual animals. Six years later, he took a trip to Dresden, where he spent two months studying with the noted animal painter Johann Siegwald Dahl (1827-1902). He then travelled to the Swedish island of Orust with Wilhelm, staying for a year.

In 1863, he built a home near his family's estate, which he named "Lugnet" . He lived there for the next twenty years, occasionally spending time with his sisters in Kuopio. In the early 1870s, he had several strokes and was often bedridden, but continued to paint as much as possible. Eventually, he had to move out of the main part of his home and occupy two smaller guest rooms upstairs. He made his last trip in 1881, to Orust, visiting Wilhelm, who was also ill.

His work became more commercial after this and, in 1886 he produced his best-known painting titled The Fighting Capercaillies. In 2006 it got third place in a public vote organized by Ateneum for Finland's "national painting", and in a similar 2013 vote held by Nordic Moneta it was again voted third most significant.

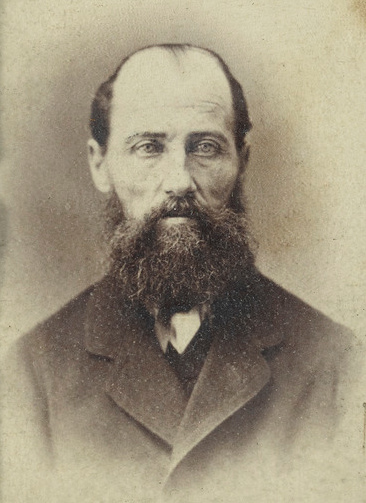
Portrait photograph from the 1880s

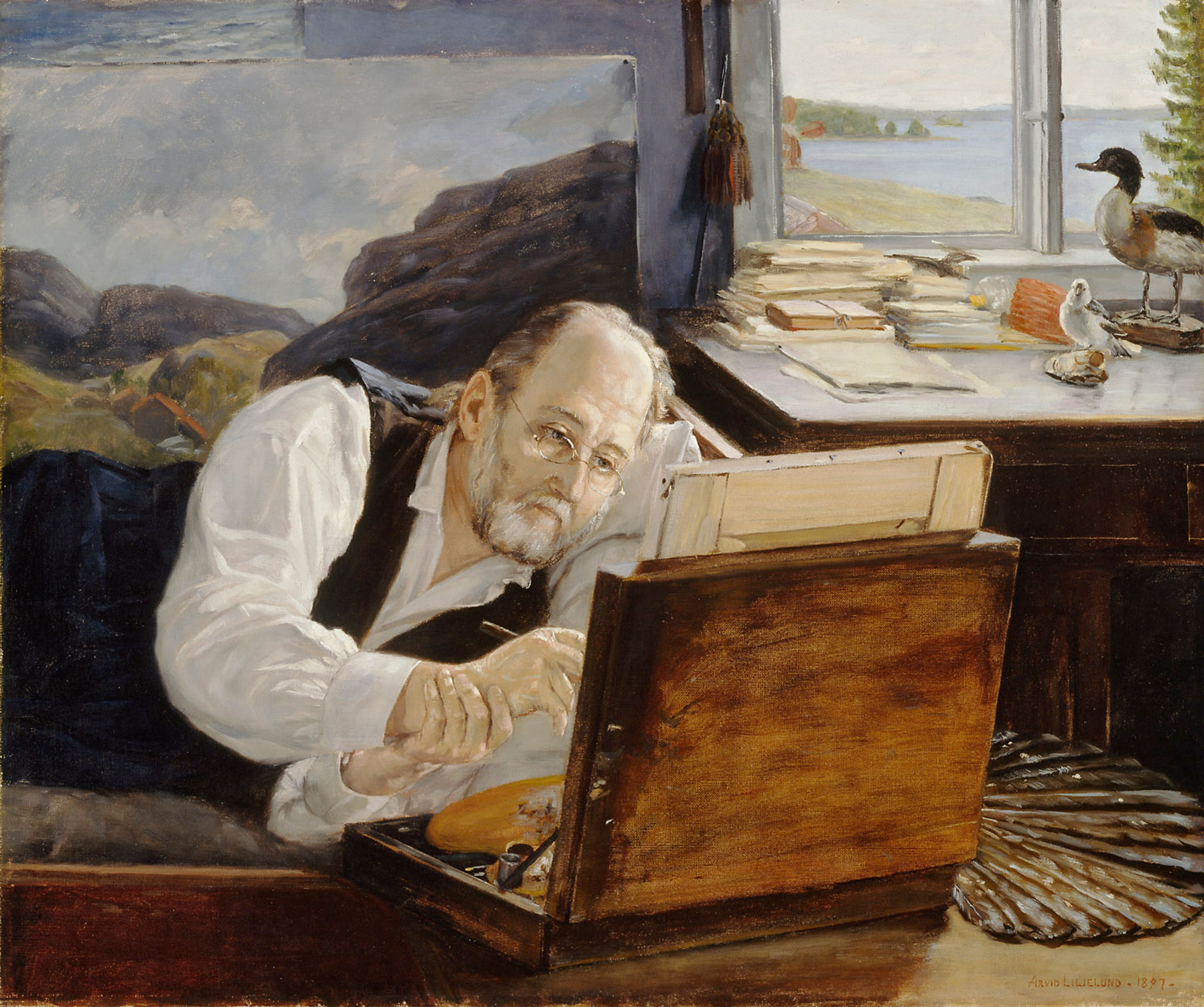
Ferdinand von Wright at Work, Arvid Liljelund, 1897

He also contributed articles to various ornithological journals. About this time, he received a state artists' pension. Many former students came to visit and, in the late 1890s, the bird painter Matti Karppanen (1873-1953) stayed on to be his pupil and assistant. Slowly, he became more withdrawn and died in 1906.

== Selected paintings ==
Animals
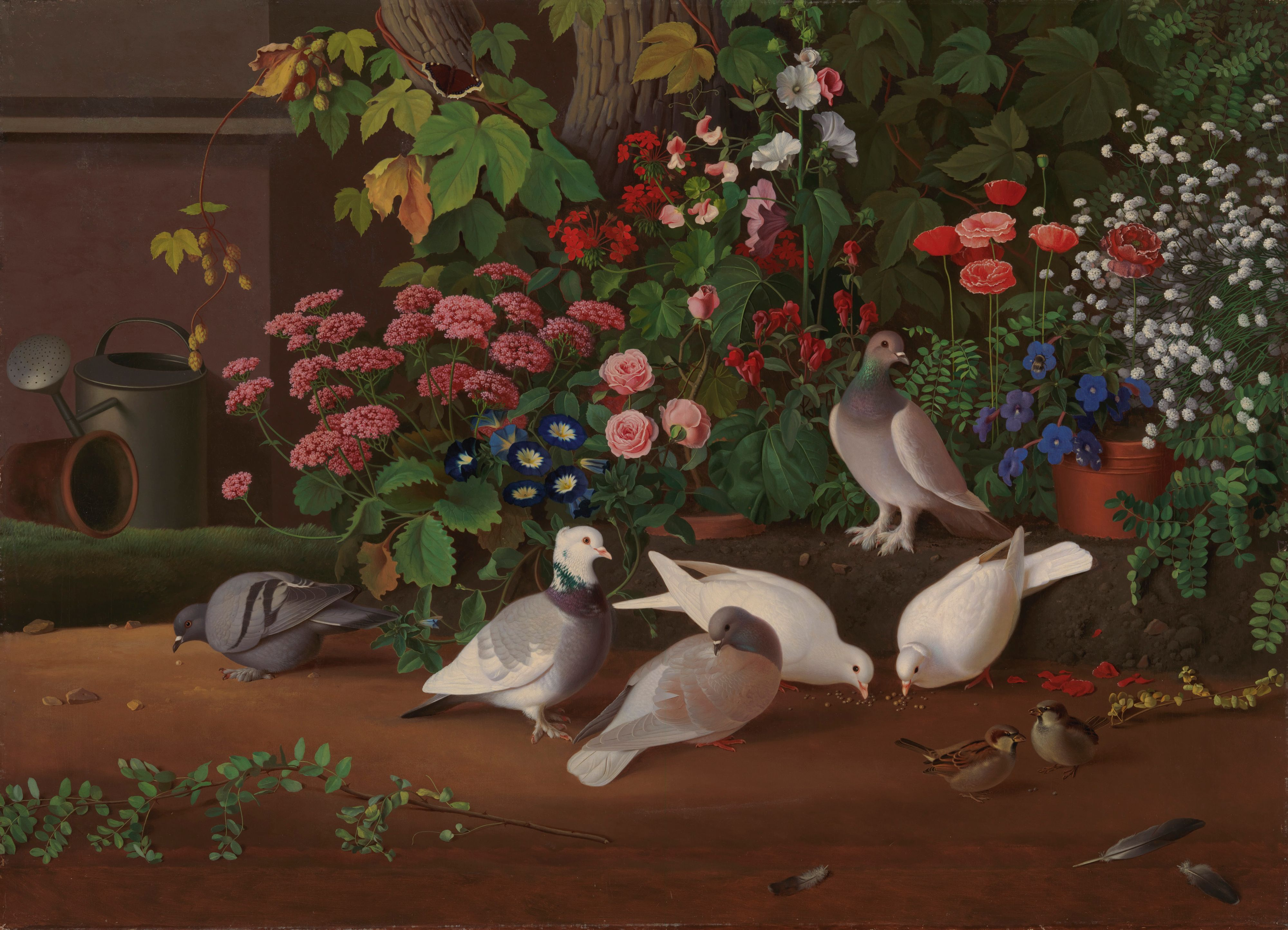
From the Garden, Flowers and Birds, 1853–54

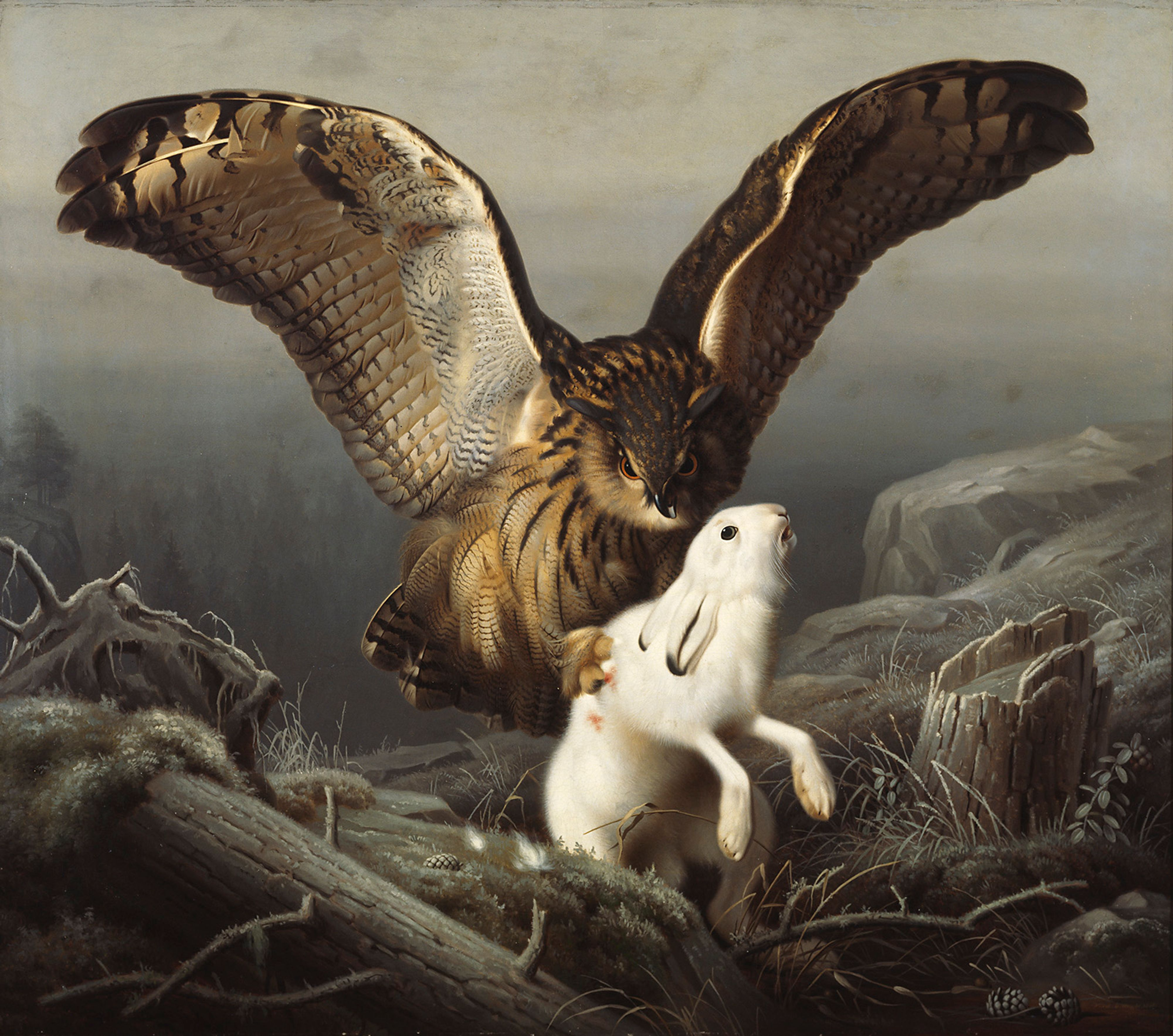
An Eagle-Owl Seizes a Hare, 1860

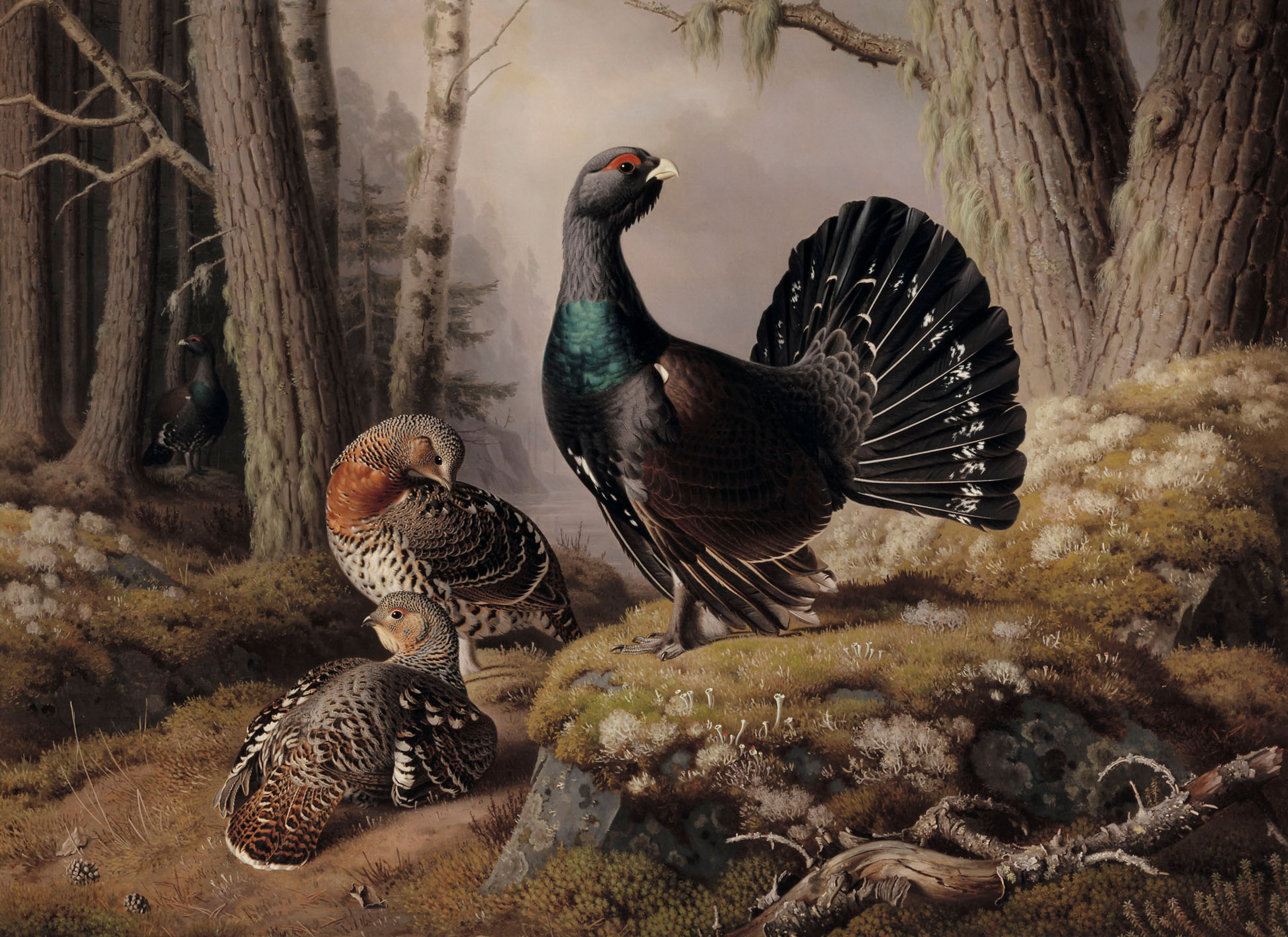
Capercaillies courting, 1862

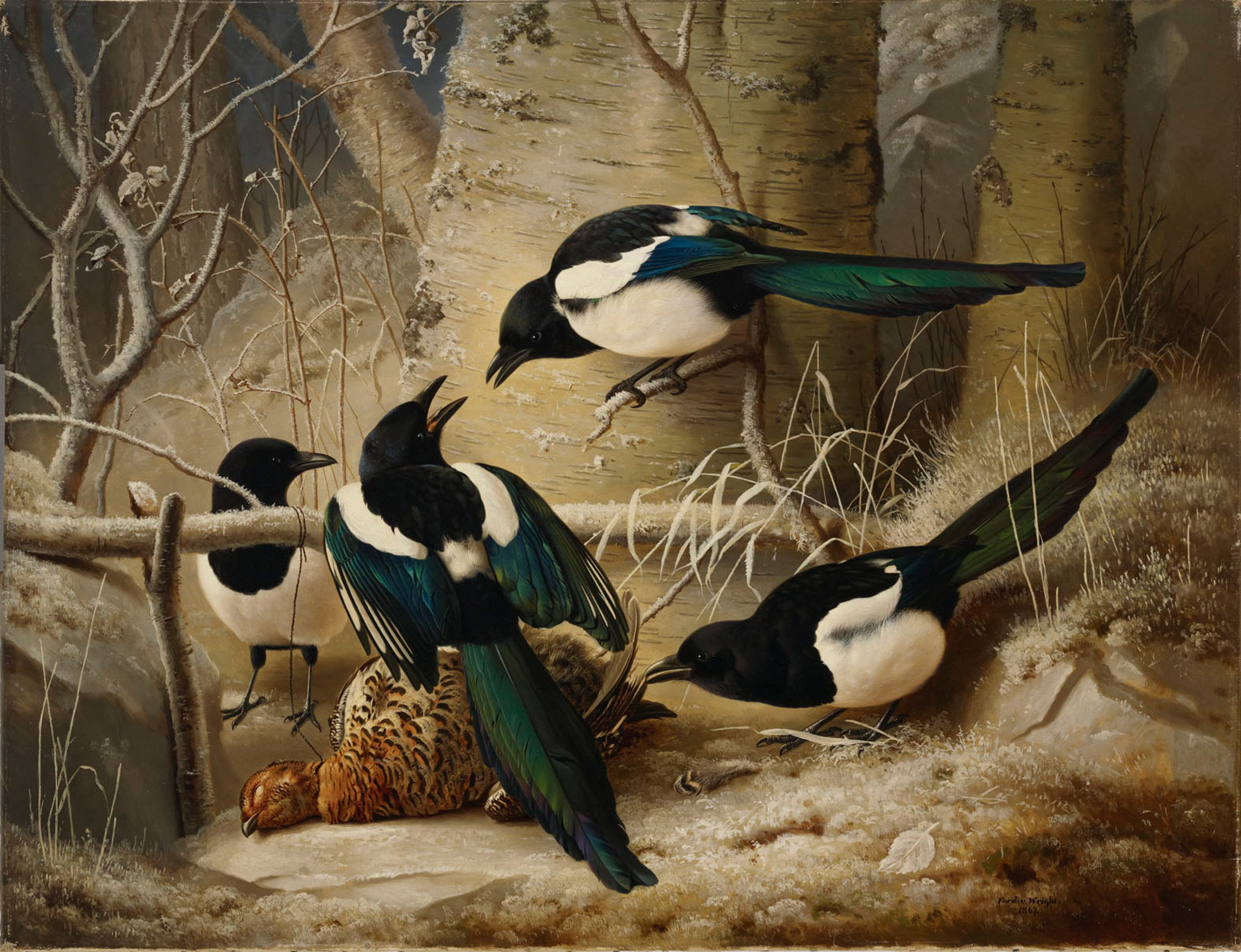
Magpies round a Dead Woodgrouse, 1867

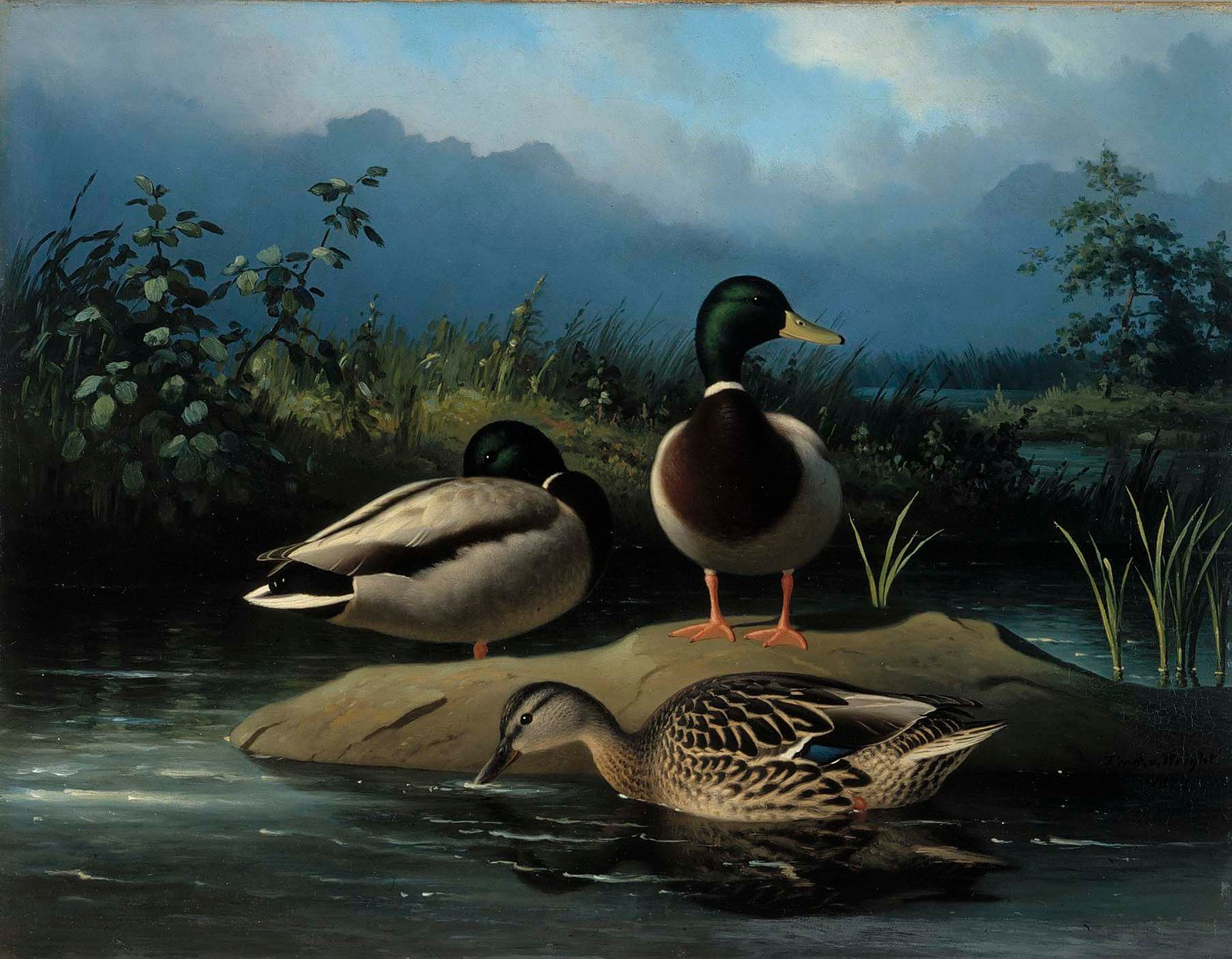
Mallards, 1874

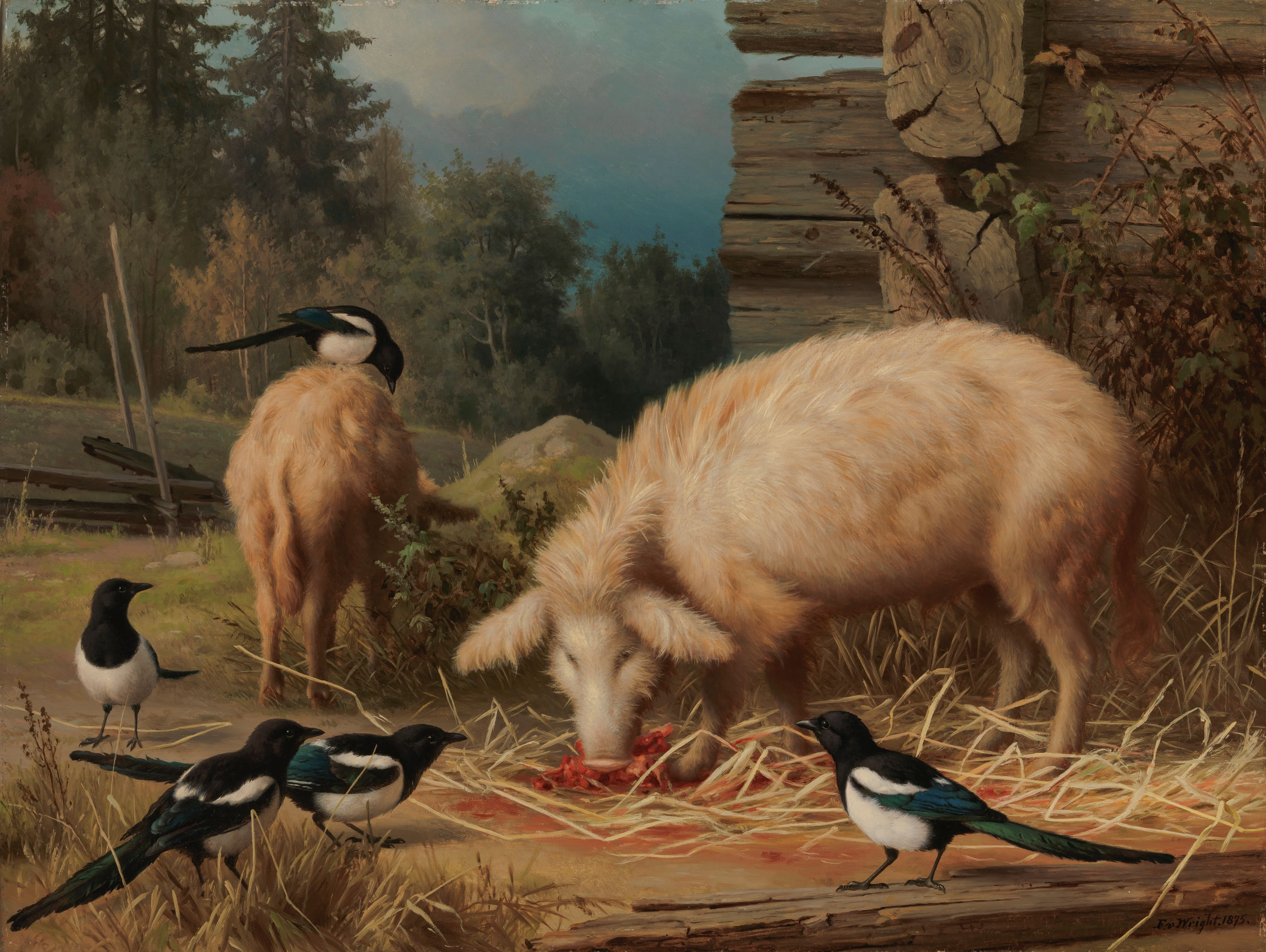
Pigs and Magpies, 1875

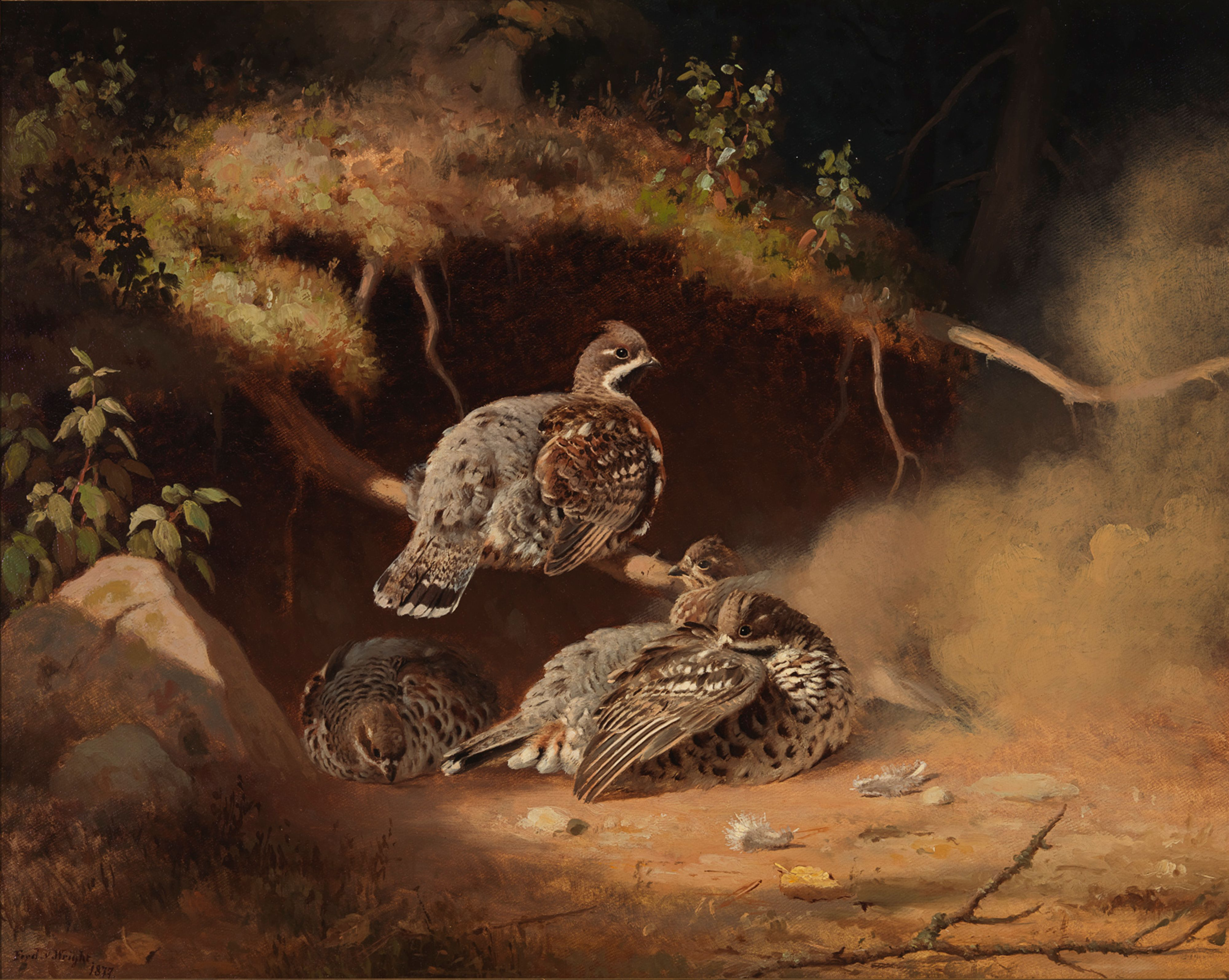
Hazel Grouse Wallowing in Sand, 1877

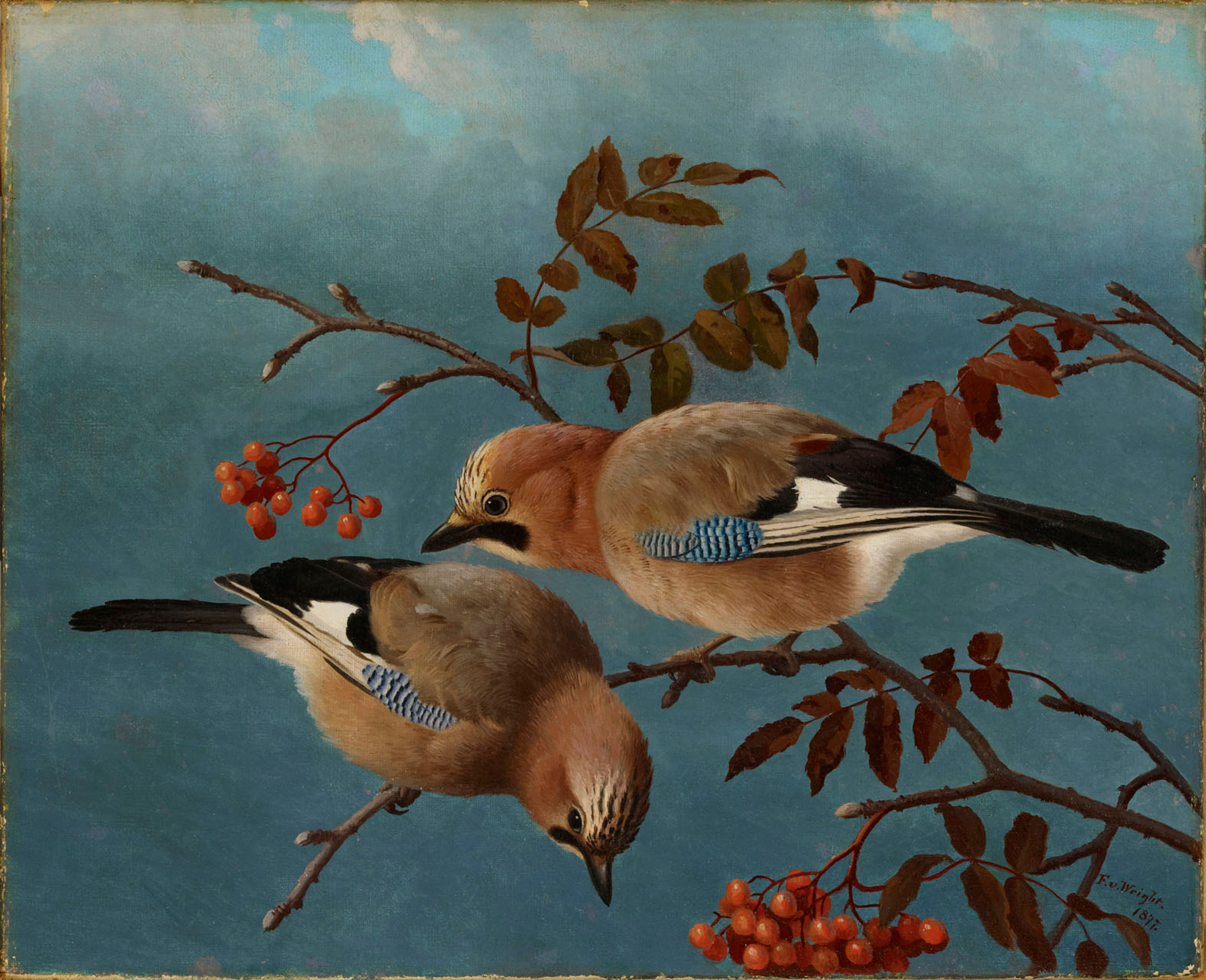
Jays, 1877

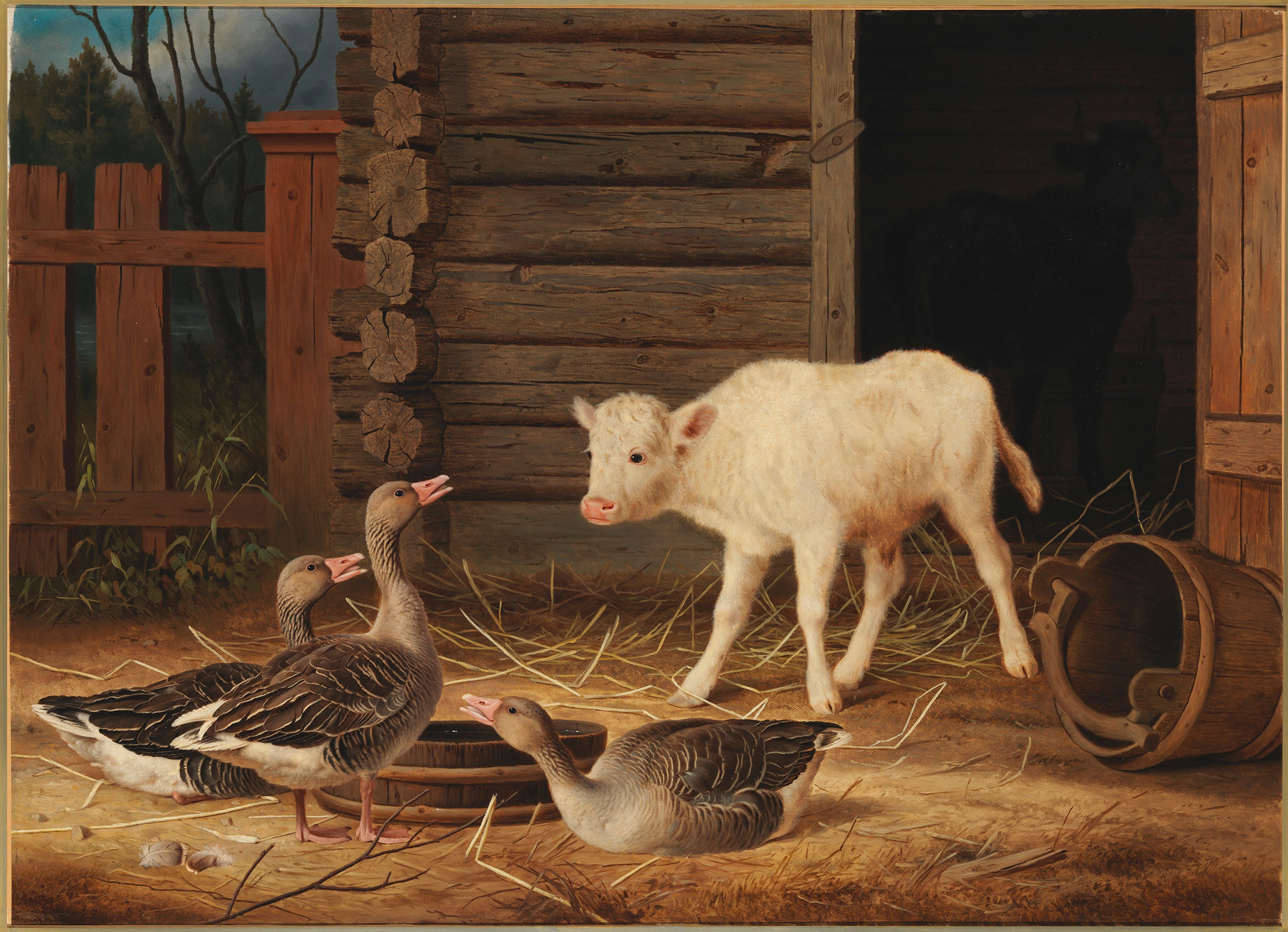
The First Surprise, 1880

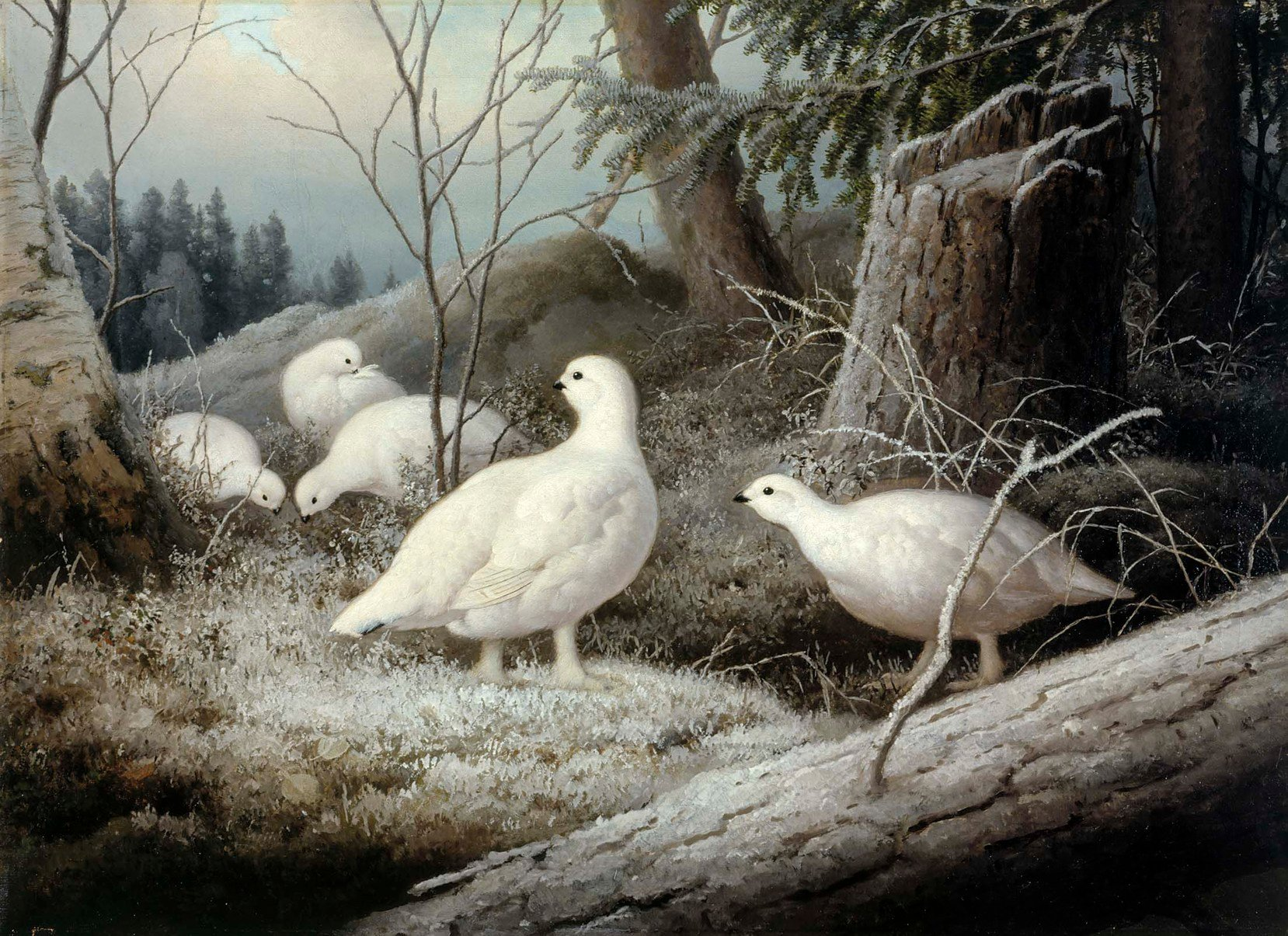
Ptarmigans, 1893

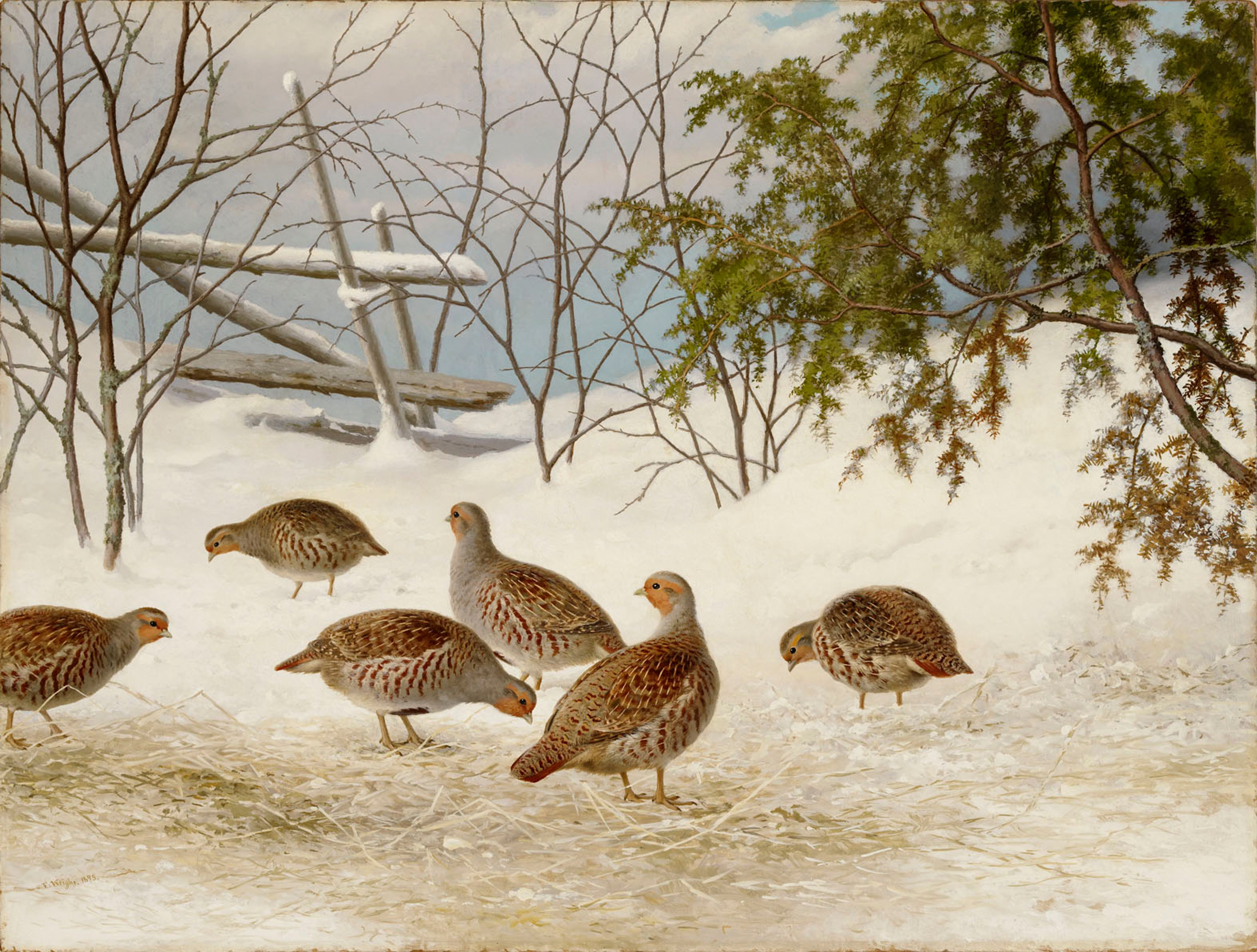
Partridges in Snow, 1895

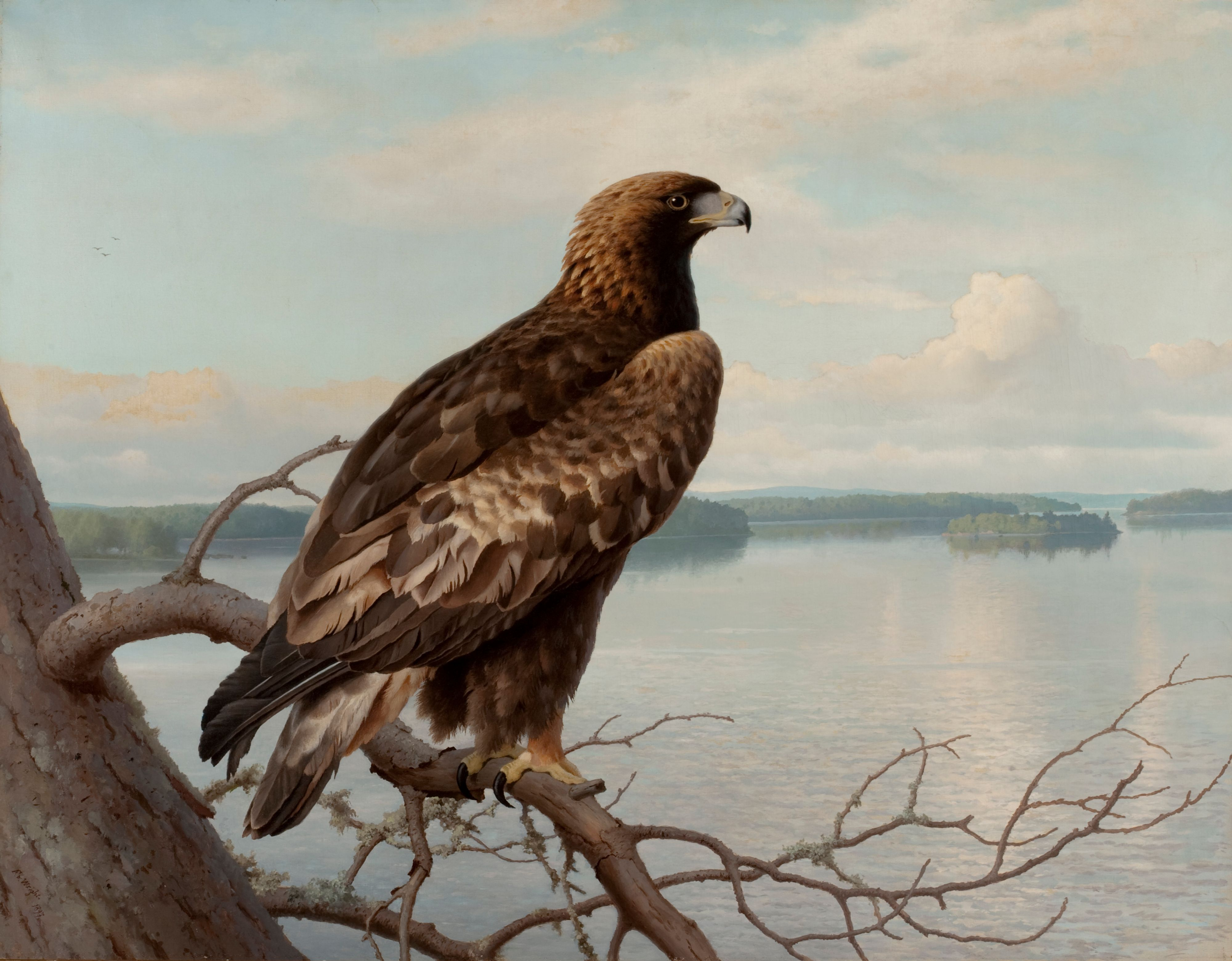
Golden Eagle by a Lake, 1897
Landscapes
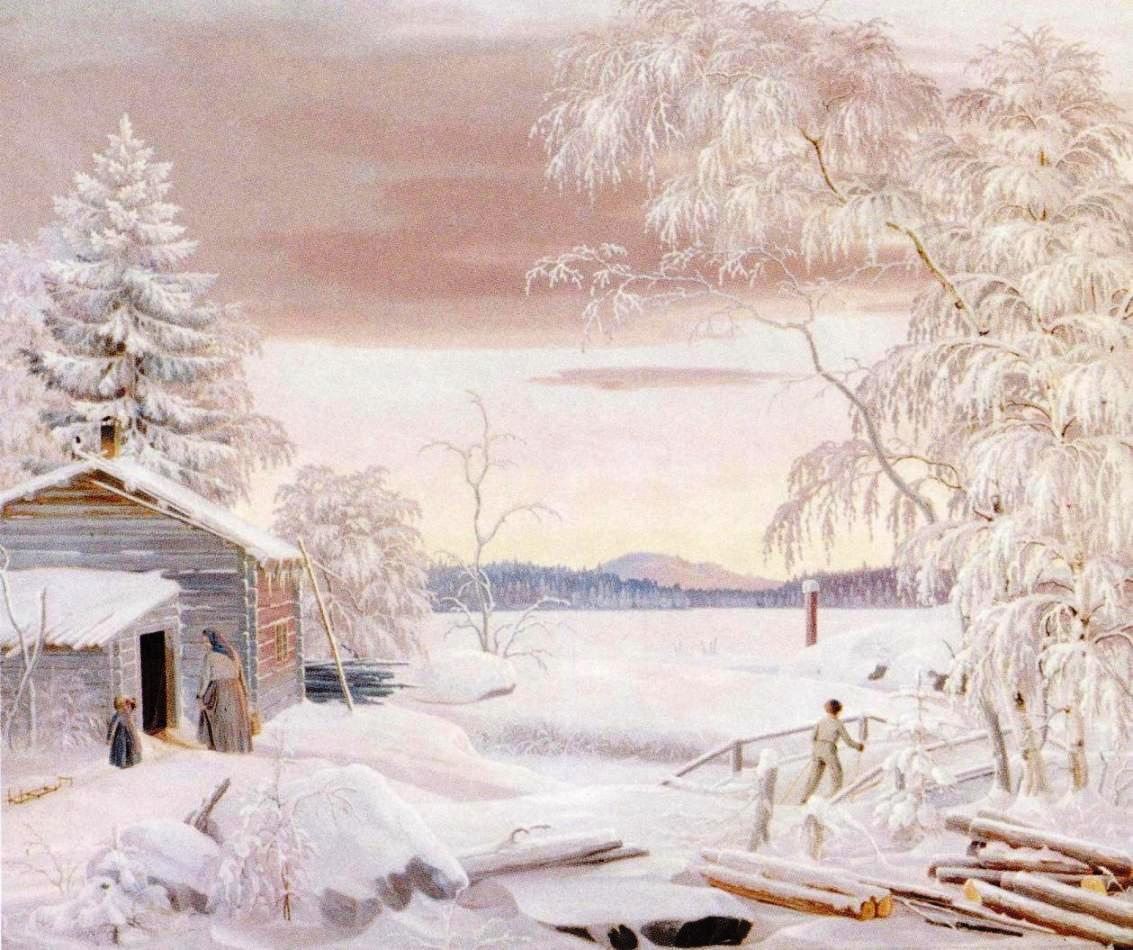
Winter Sunset in Savo Province, 1848

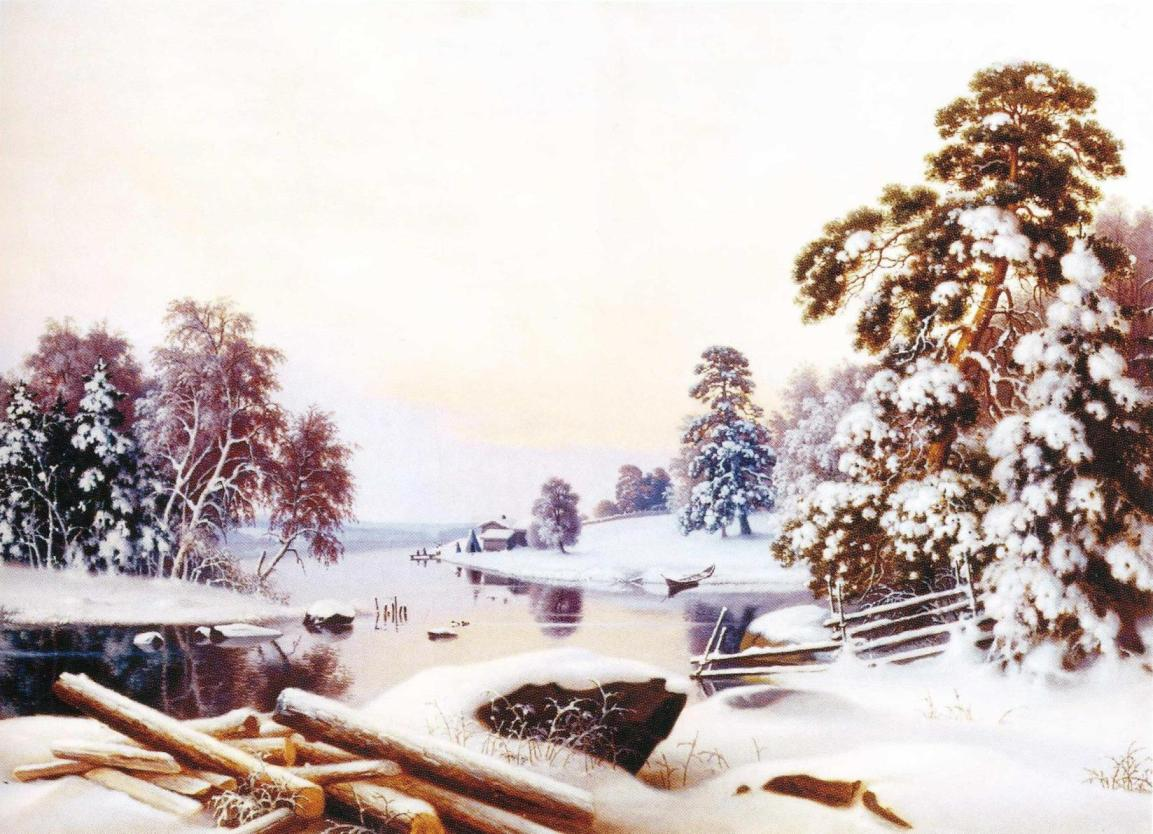
Winter landscape in Haminalahti, 1856

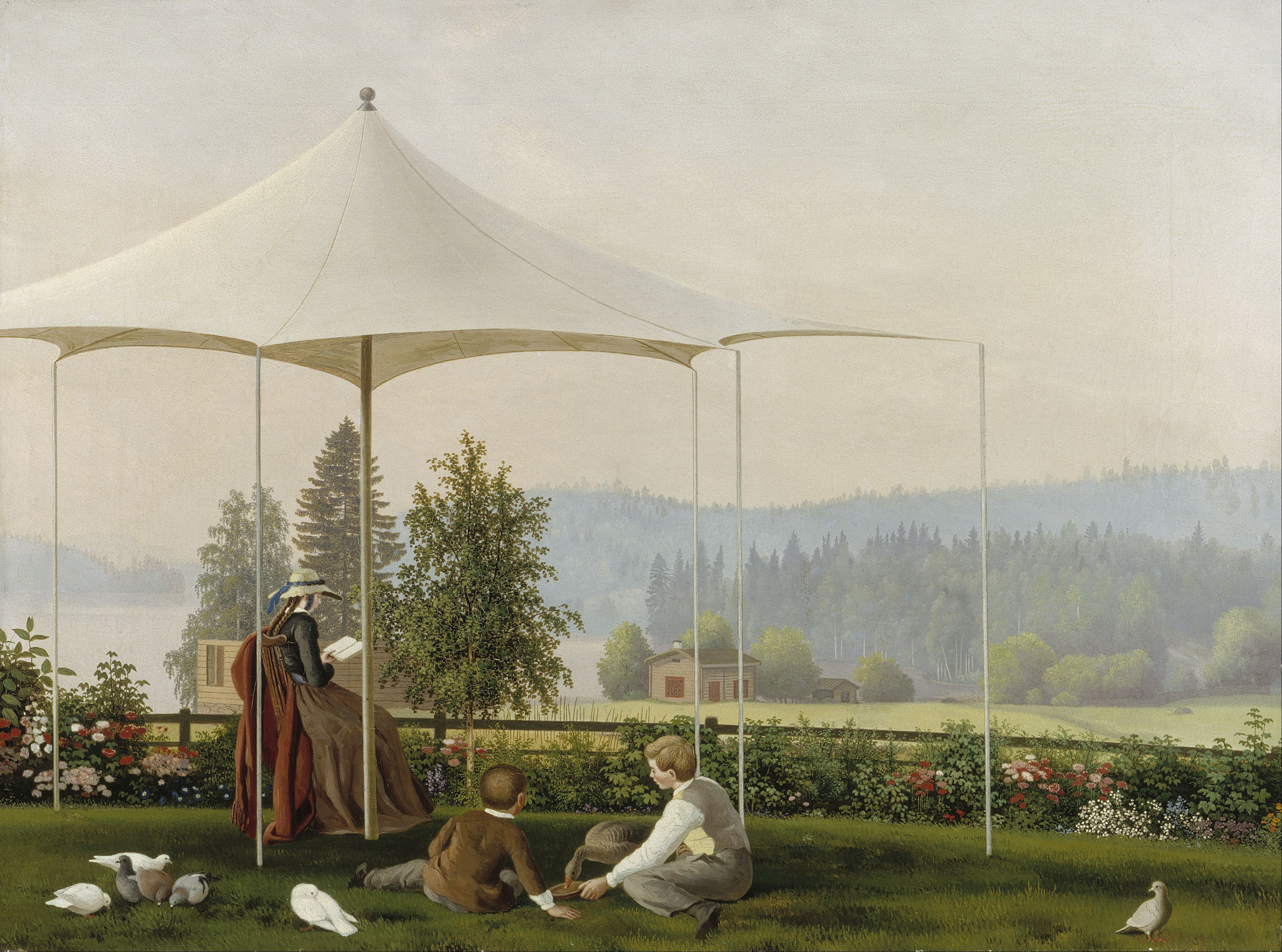
In the Garden of Haminalahti, 1856–57

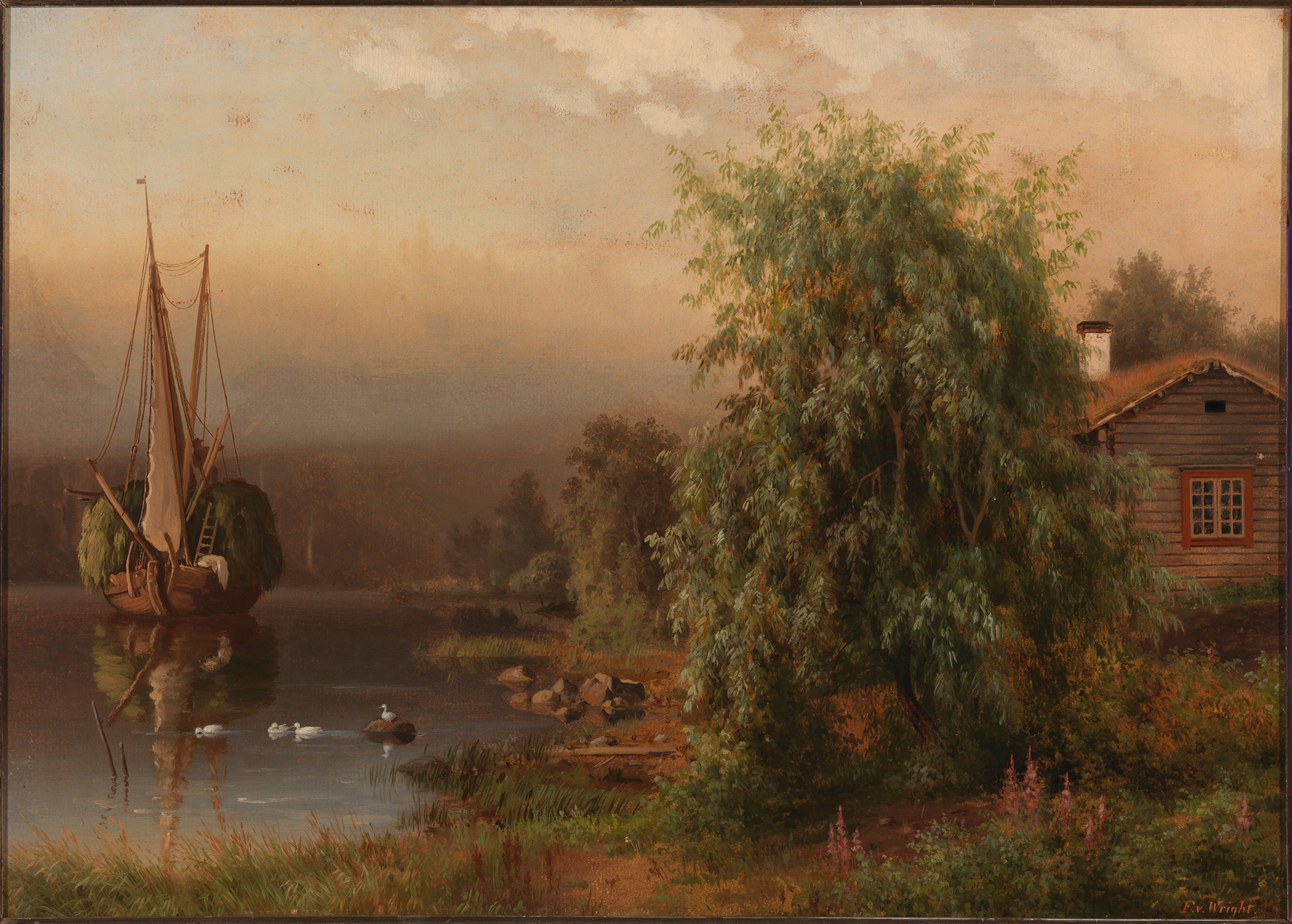
Landscape in Morning Fog, 1864

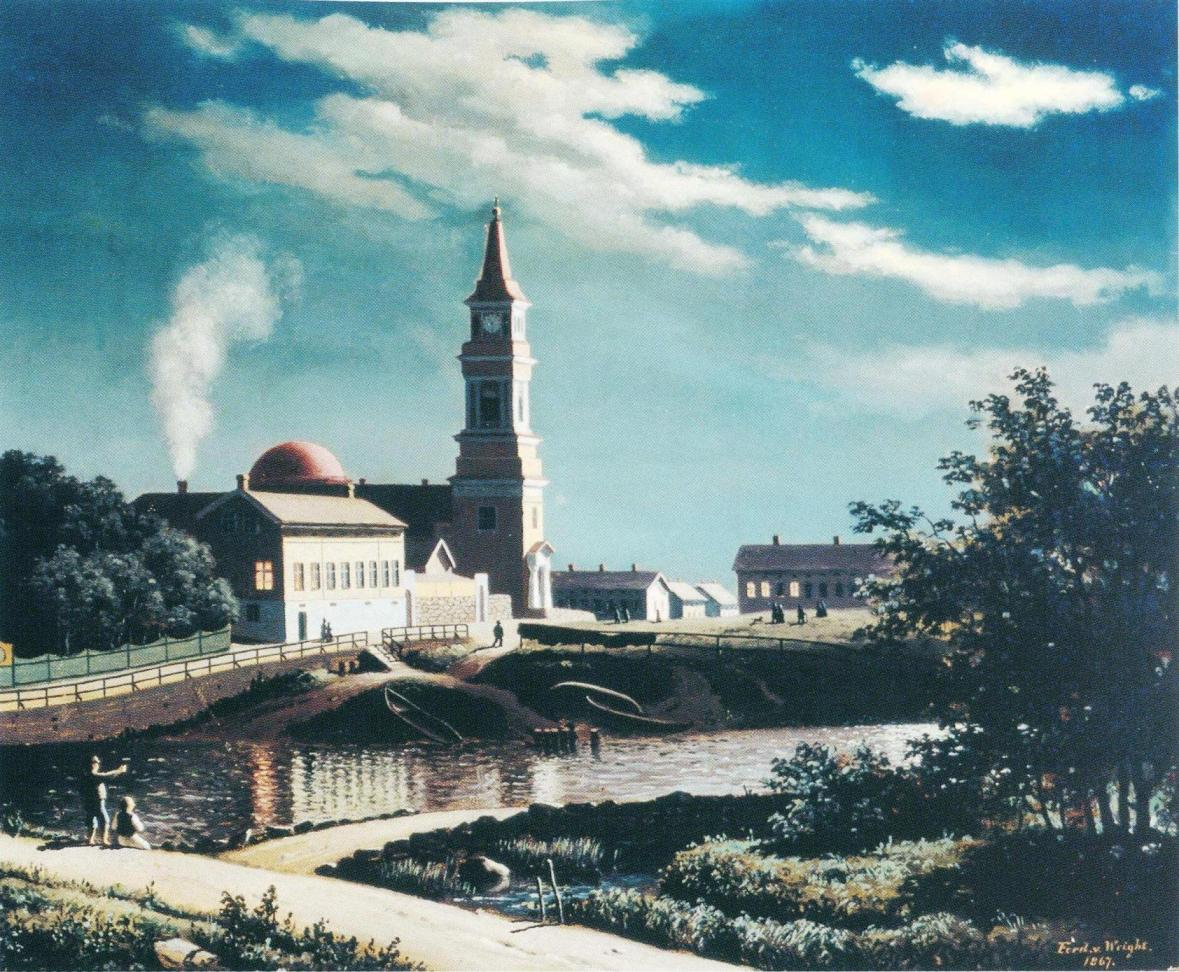
Moonlit Oulu, 1867

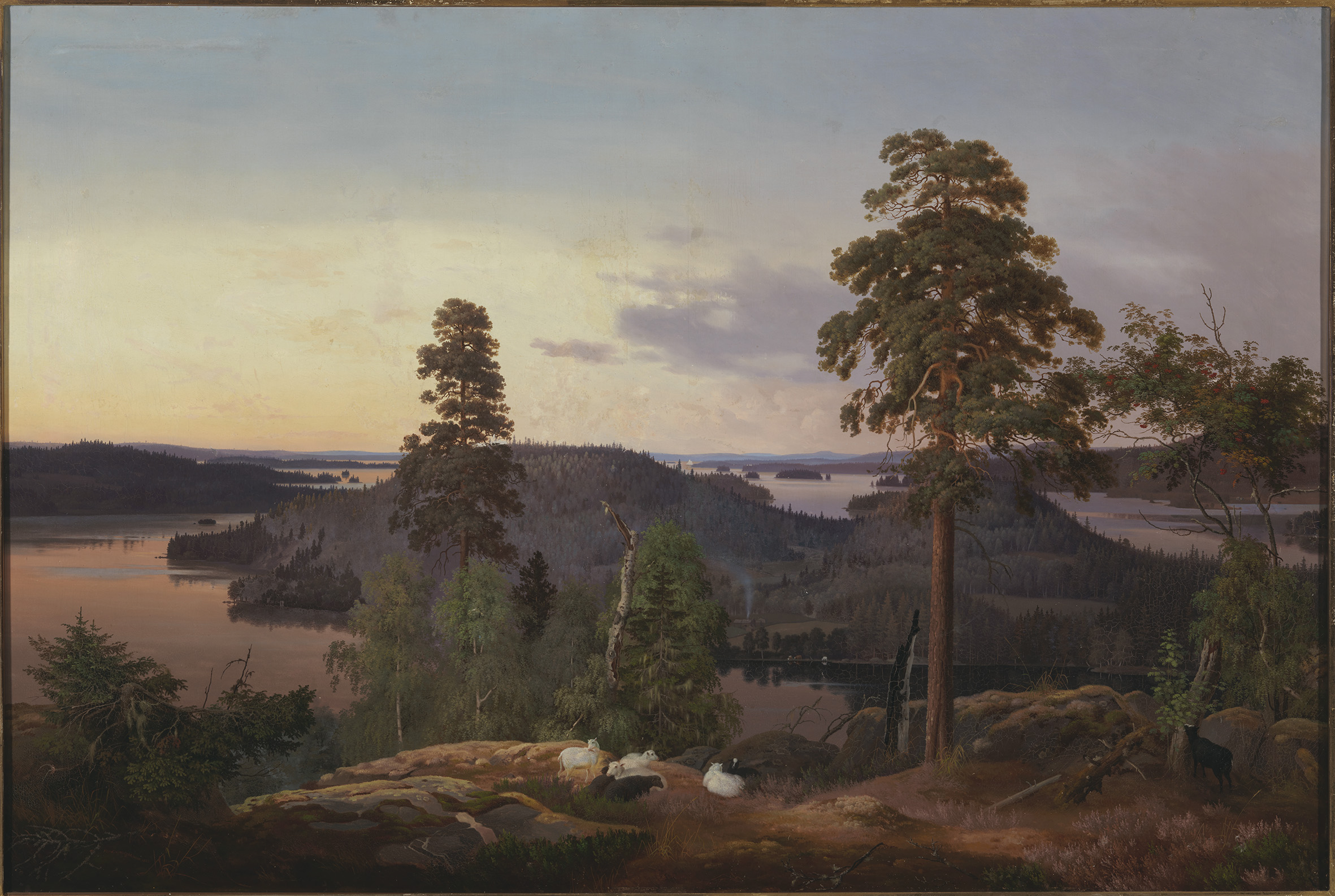
Haminalahti Landscape, 1853

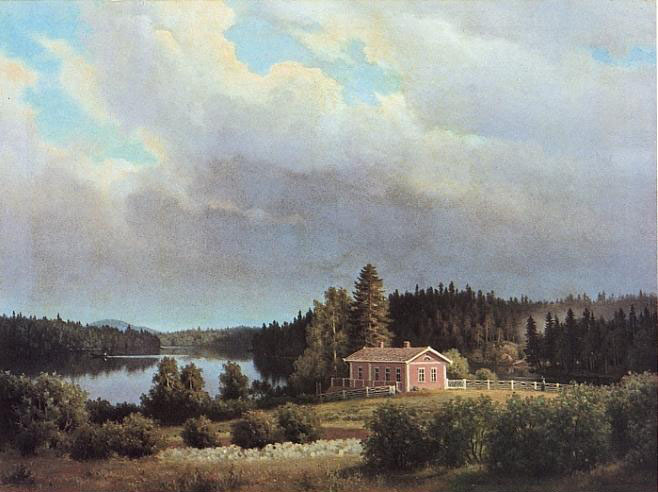
Lugnet Landscape, 1877

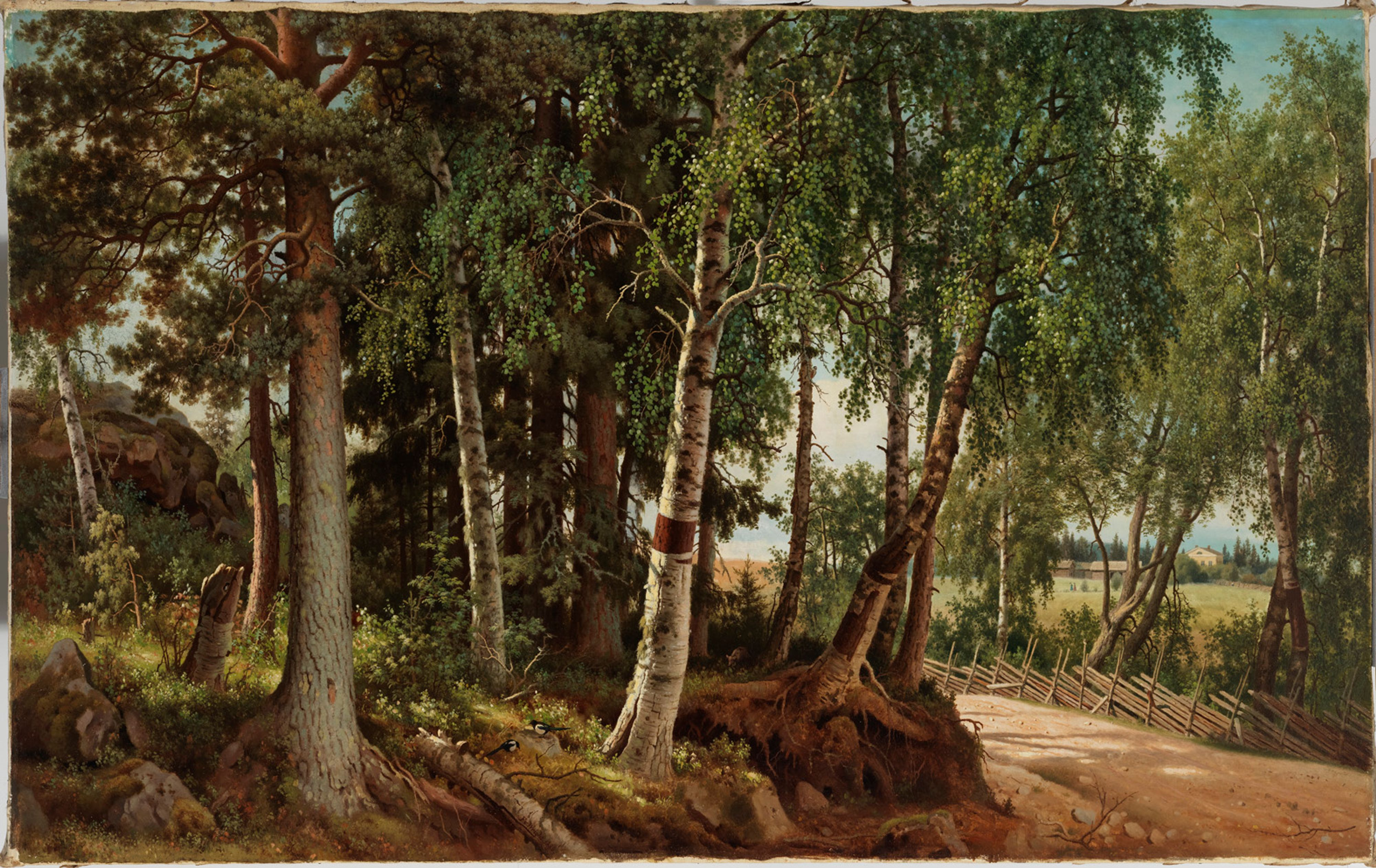
Haminalahti Forest Landscape, 1880

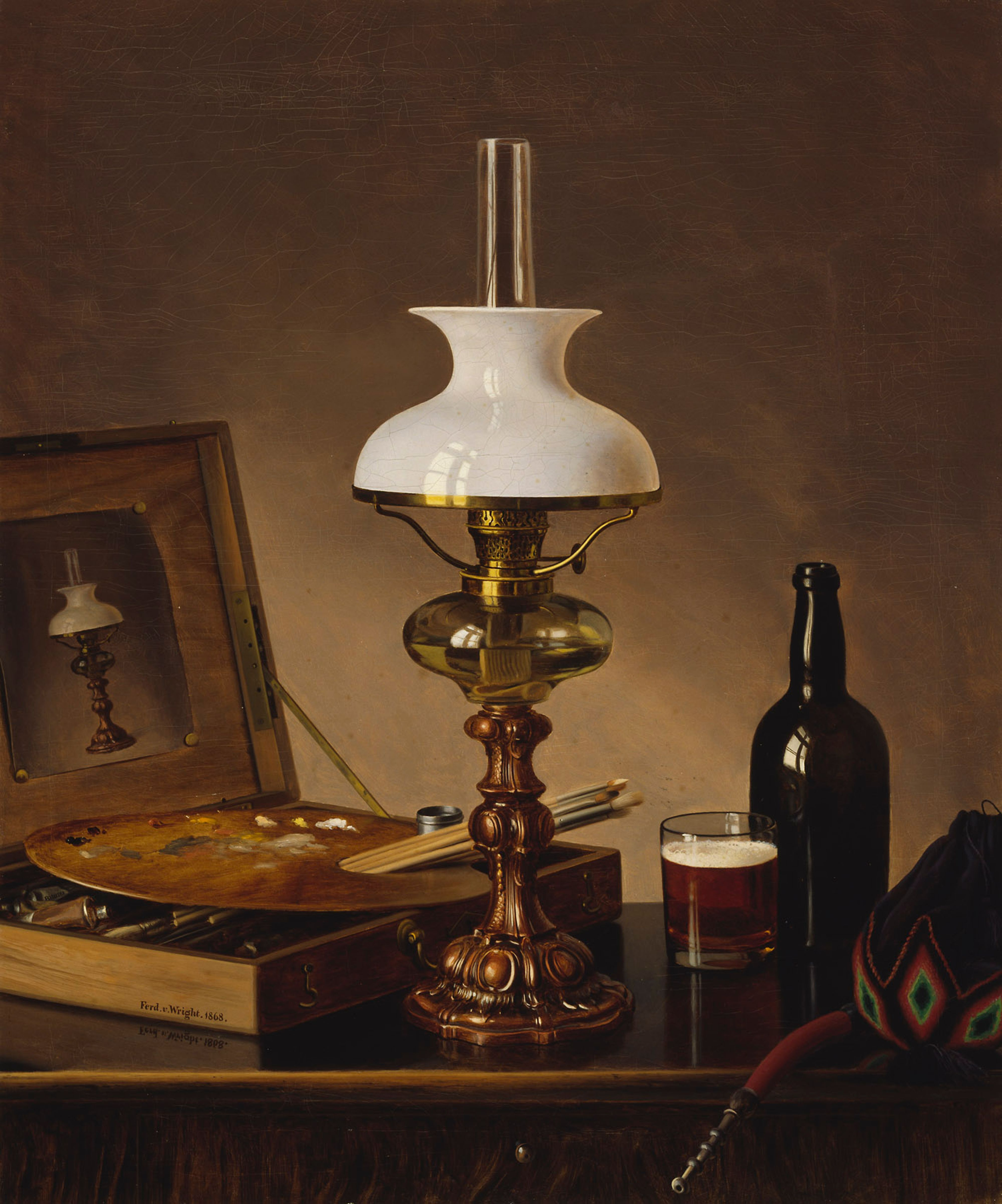
Still-life in the Atelier, 1868

== See also ==
- Art in Finland
- Golden Age of Finnish Art
