= Evert Julius Bonsdorff =

Finnish physician and professor of anatomy and physiology

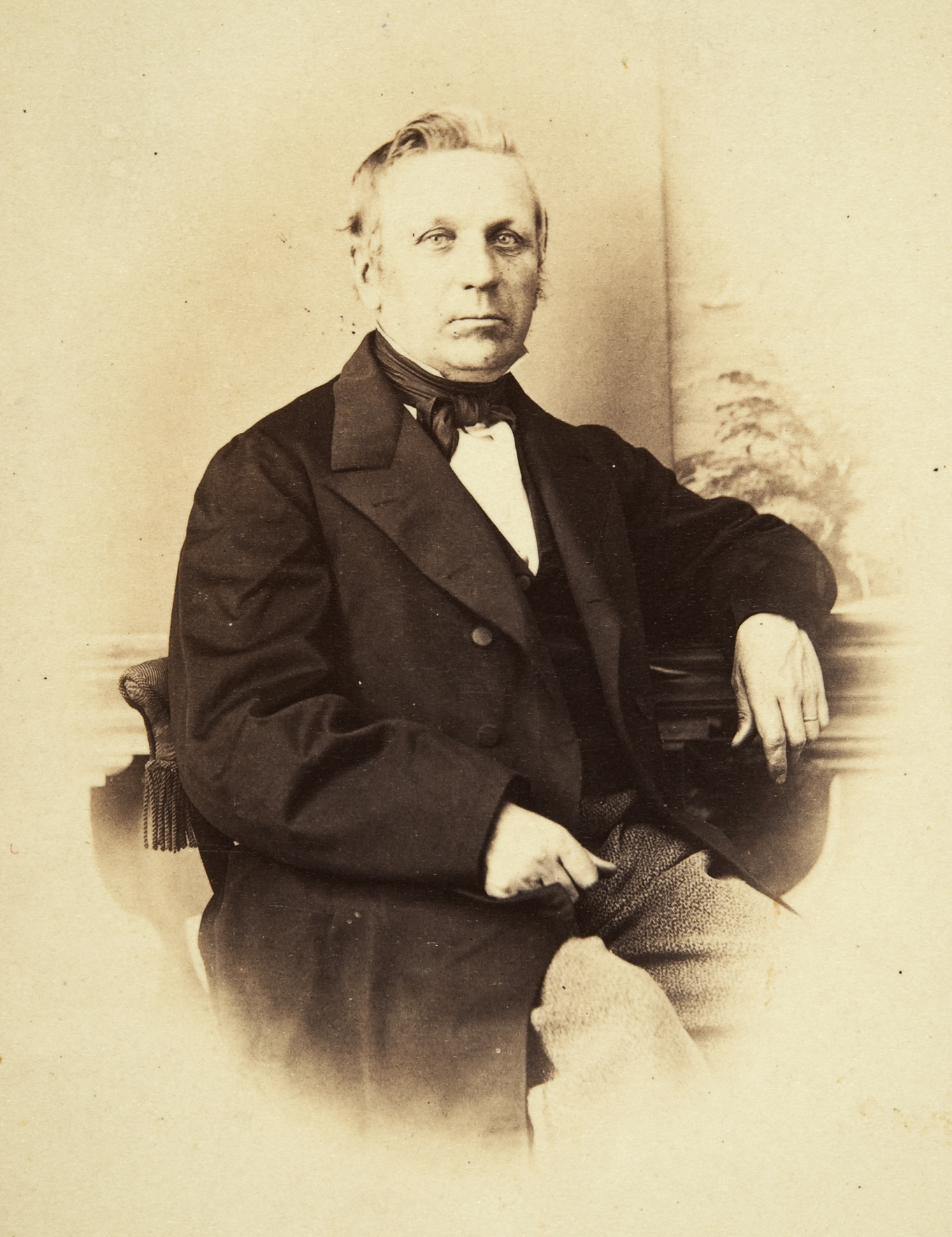
c. 1865

Evert Julius Bonsdorff (24 September 1810 – 30 July 1898) was a Finnish physician and professor of anatomy and physiology who worked on comparative anatomy. He also described many species of insects from Finland.

== Life and work ==
Bonsdorff was born in Åbo (Turku) in a family of German origin. The family claimed origins in Lüneburg and had moved to Uleåborg (Oulu) during the reign of Queen Kristina. His father Johan Bonsdorff was a professor of Greek at the University of Helsinki married to Erika Emerentia Wasz. A grand uncle Jakob had been a professor of Lutheran theology while another uncle Gabriel who was a professor of natural history and veterinary science had been ennobled as von Bonsdorff.

After private home tuitions from his father and from a few others like Johan Jakob Nervander he joined the university at the age of fifteen where he studied physics under Gustaf Gabriel Hällström and chemistry from a cousin Pehr Adolf von Bonsdorff. He studied natural history under C. R. Sahlberg who sent students on entomological collection excursions to places like Runsala. These excursions included other students like August Leonard Ahlstedt and Johan Philip Palmen both of whom later became Bonsdorffs' brothers-in-law. He received a magister philosophiae in 1832.

He took a keen interest in entomology, collecting specimens and examined the behavior of insects during the solar eclipse of 1851. He wrote a two volume work on the Diptera of Finland based on his collections. He then joined the university for medical studies where his teachers included N. A. Ursin, Immanuel Ilmoni (who had trained under Israel Hwasser), and Carl Daniel von Haartman. Bonsdorff's thesis in 1836 was of a philosophical nature and was based on the physiology related work of Treviranus, Meckel and Carl Gustav Carus.

He became a chief medical officer with the Finnish navy in 1835 and on receiving his license in 1836 he became a battalion doctor for the Finnish Guards' Rifle Battalion. His 1837 thesis under Ursin's supervision was on the general physiological considerations involved in the concepts of life and organism ("Allmänna physiologiska betraktelser öfver begreppen lif och organism"). He went to study in Stockholm under Anders Retzius around 1838–39. Retzius and Bonsdorff remained regular correspondents. In the 1840s he established a zoological collection at the university, with the help of Magnus von Wright who prepared most of the specimens of Bonsdorff. Von Wright produced a book on the bird life of Finland in 1859 and here a boundary for Finland was carefully defined, one that Bonsdorff also followed in his work on the diptera of Finland.

Bonsdorff became a permanent professor in 1846. He took an interest in comparative anatomy which was inspired by the traditions of Cuvier. This included anatomical studies, particularly the nerves of the head, of the dog, hooded crow, common crane, and other animals. He then looked at the portal vein system of the burbot. He however did not take much interest in Darwinian thinking which began with his nephew Johan Axel Palmen. As part of his medical research he examined the history of forensic medicine in Finland. Bonsdorff began to take an interest in agriculture from the 1850s. As a physician he only served some wealthy clients.

Around 1845 he examined hydrotherapy which had been in fashion during the period, making visits to sanatoriums in Germany. He supported the ideas of hydrotherapy and experimented with water at different temperatures particularly as a treatment for tuberculosis. In 1853 he made notes on a cholera outbreak in Turku. He took an interest in the diptera of Finland thanks to the collections made by him and P. F. Wahlberg which he sorted and examined in collaboration with J. W. Zetterstedt in Lund. Bonsdorff helped establish a large zoological collection which included birds and anatomical preparations which included a collection of human skulls of different ethnic groups. He retired in 1871.

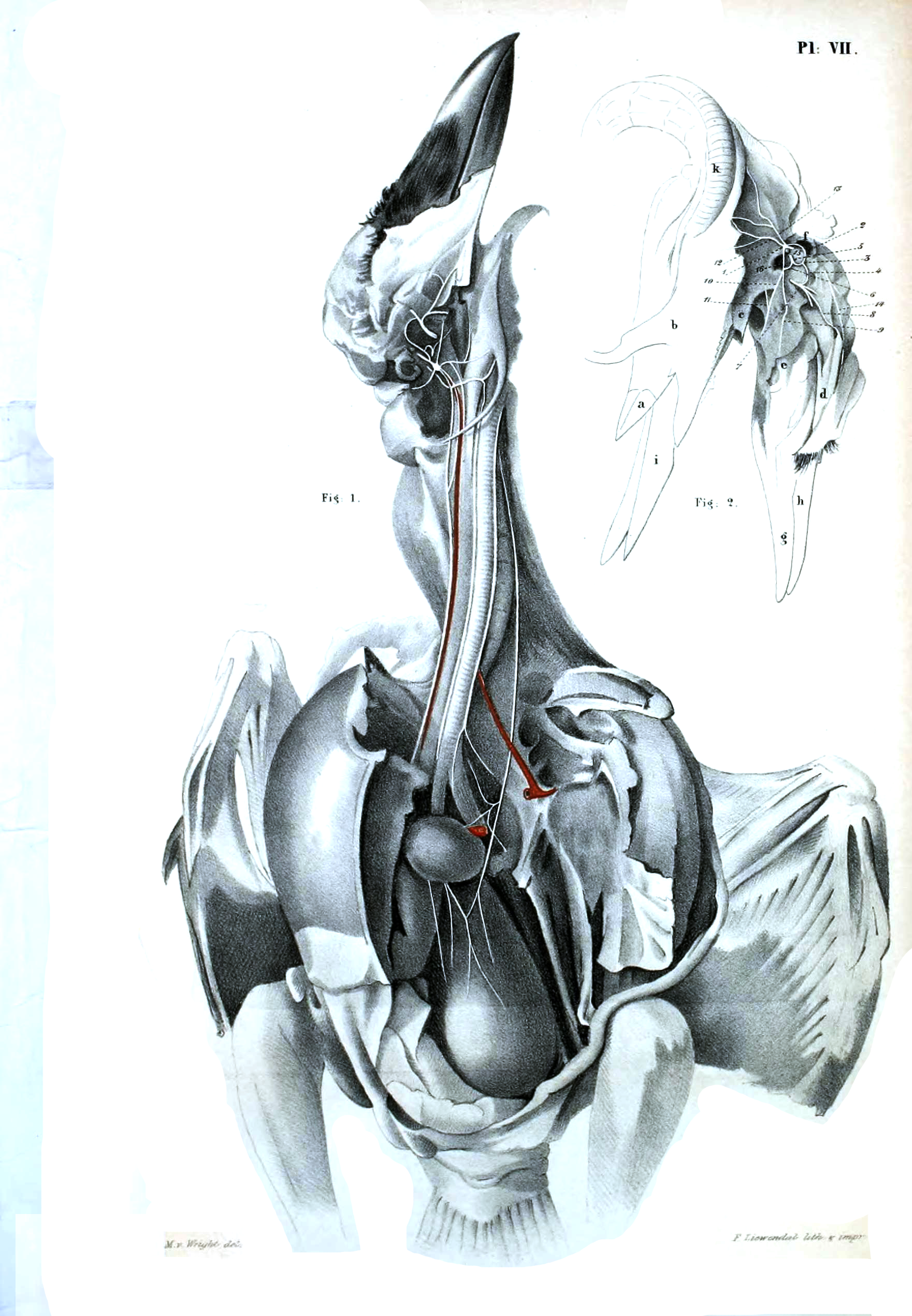
Anatomy of the hooded crow

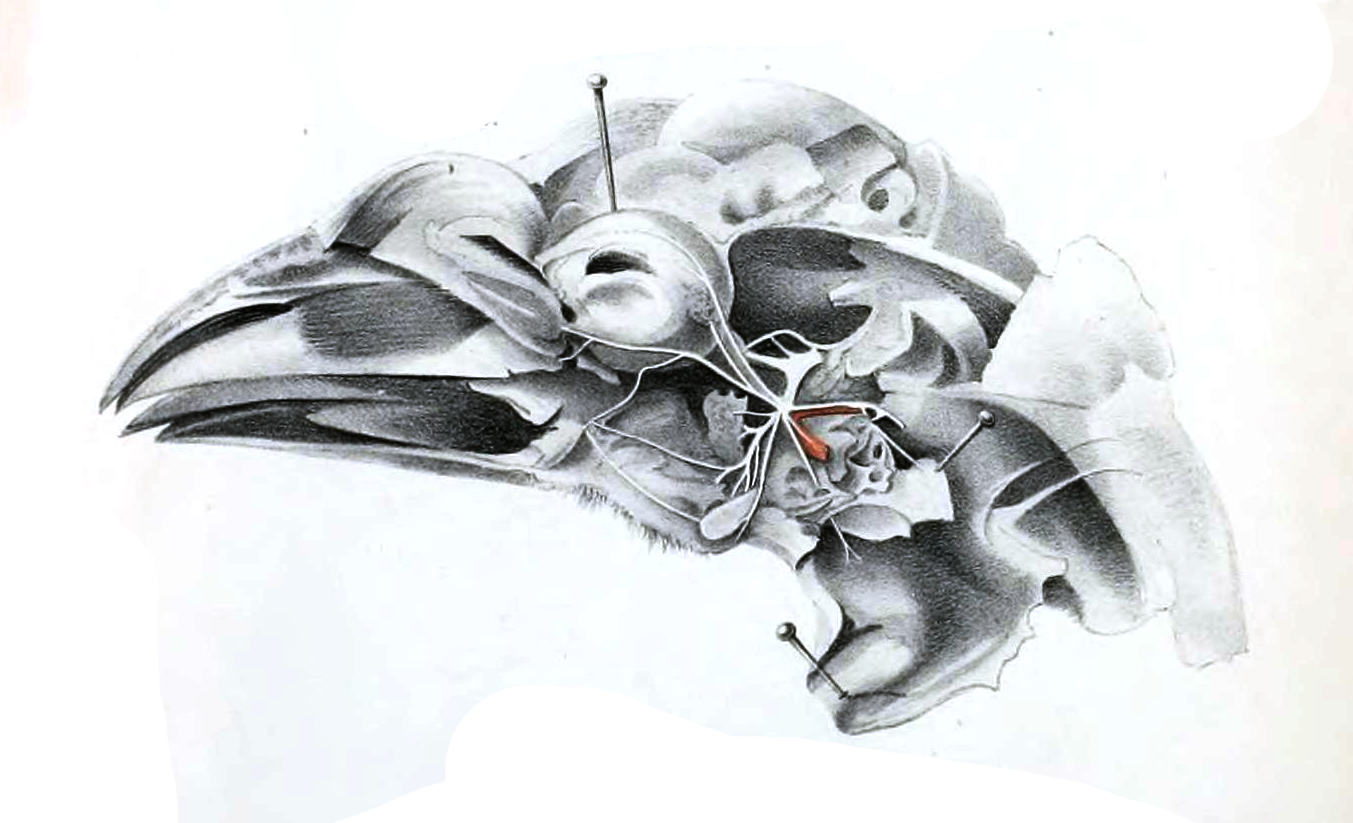
Nerves of the head

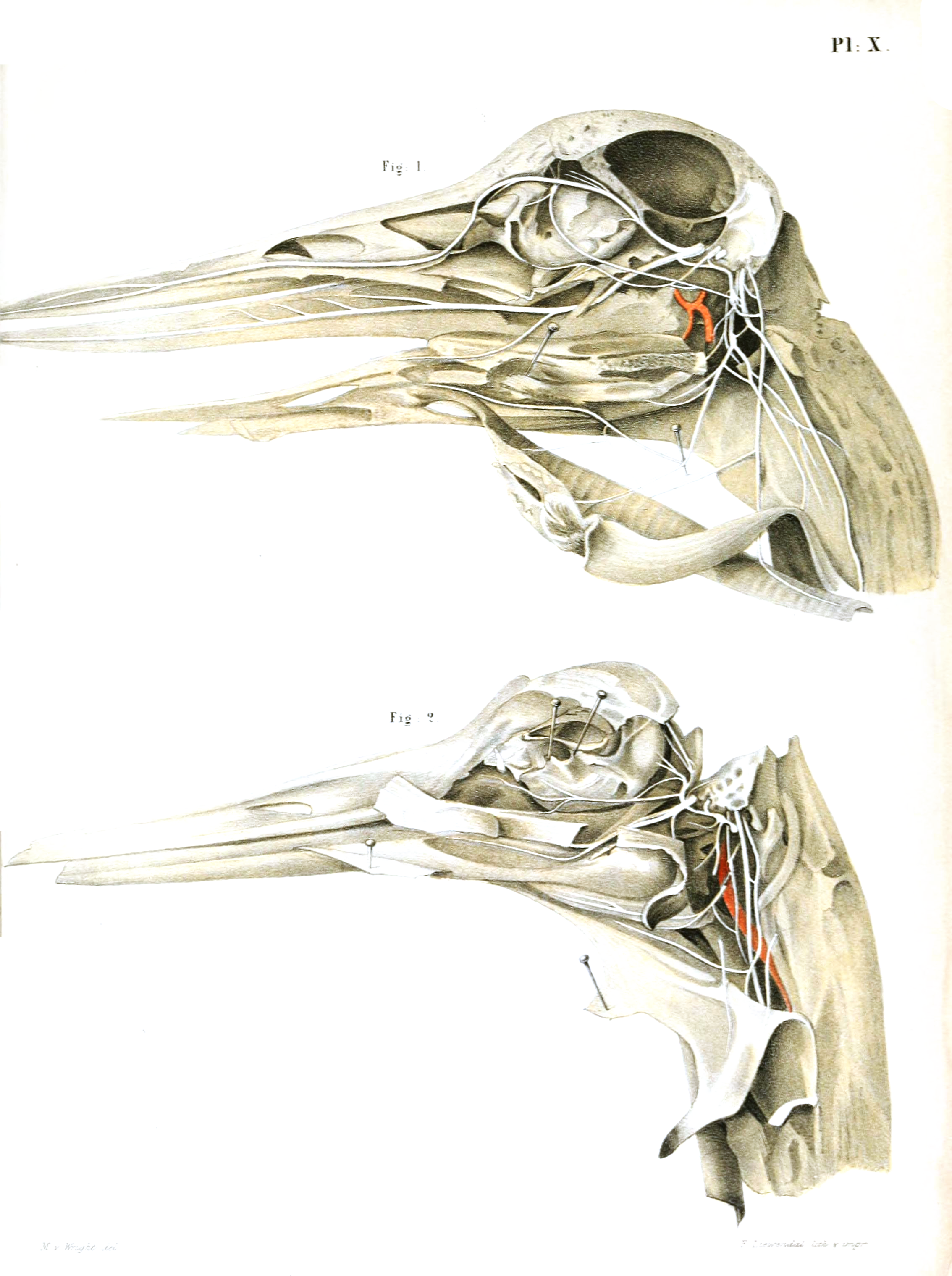
Nerves of the head of common crane

Bonsdorff married Vendla Ottiliana von Willebrand in 1837 and she died in 1842 leaving three children. His grandson Jarl Axel Wasastjerna became a noted physicist.
