= Wrede passage =

Passage entity in Helsinki, Finland

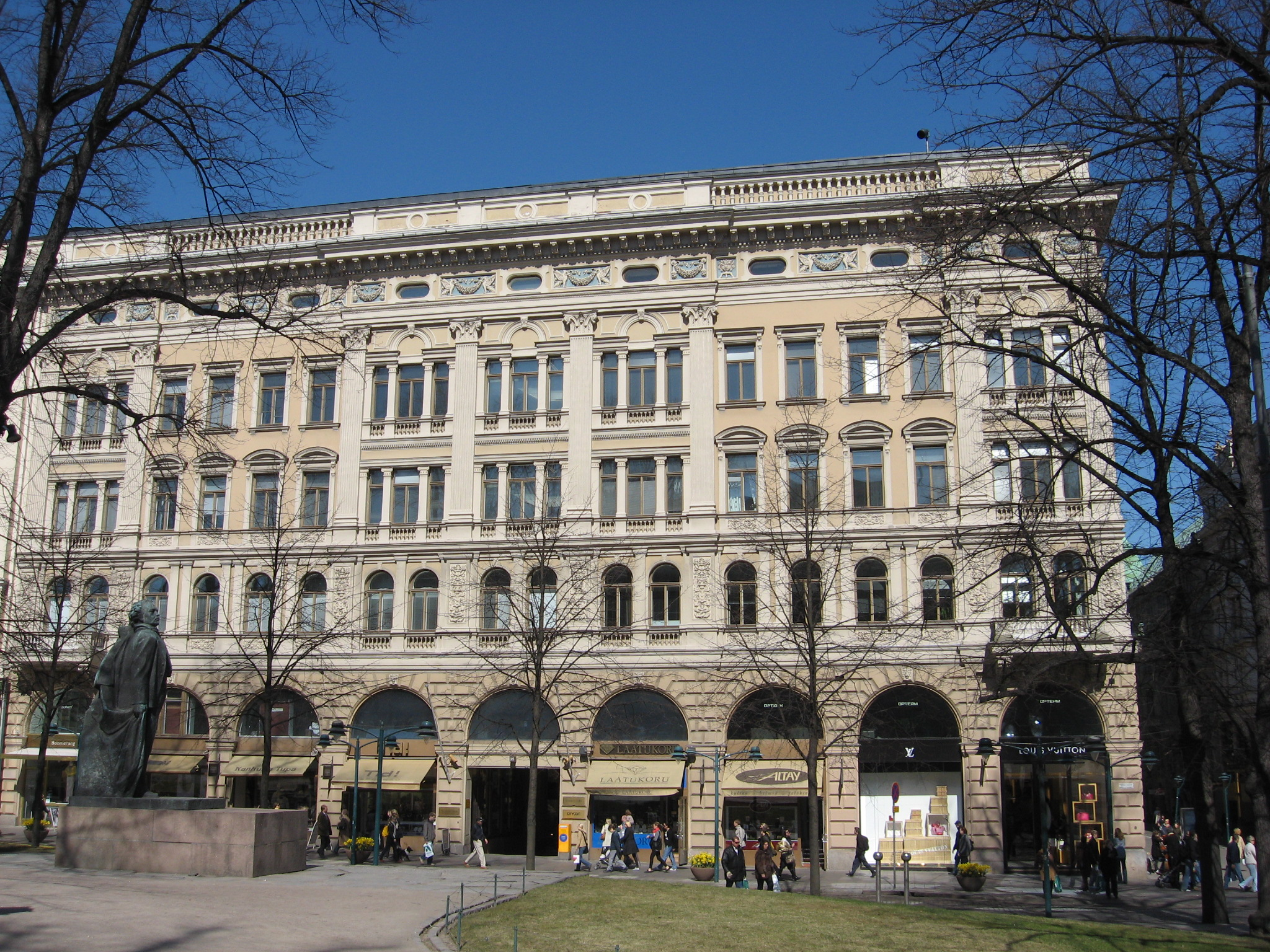
The southern end of the Wrede passage at the Wrede house (Pohjoisesplanadi 35).

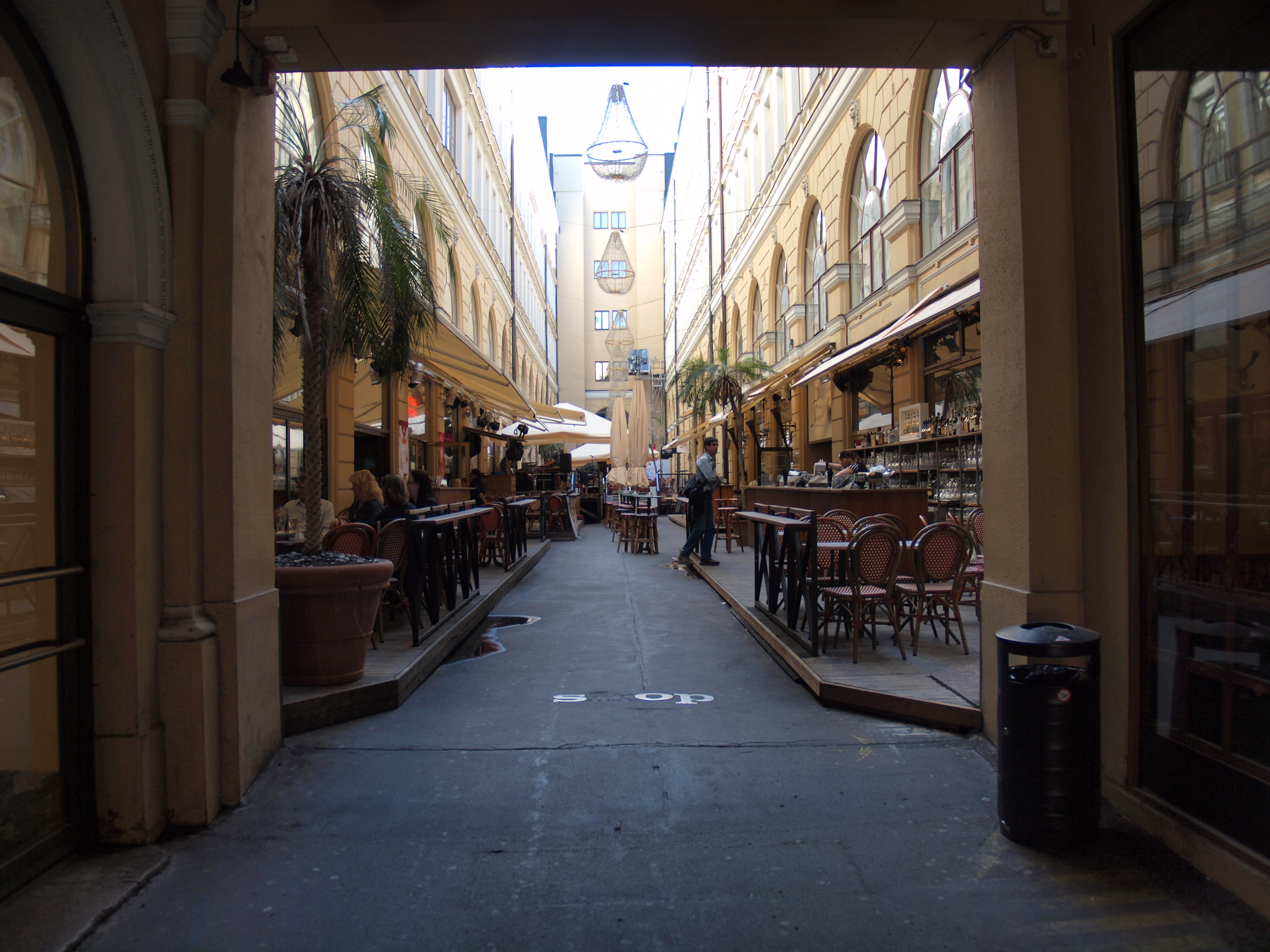
The Old merchant alley, known as the "Grandma tunnel".

The Wrede passage (Finnish: Wreden pasaasi; also known as the "Old merchant alley", Finnish: Vanha kauppakuja, or the "Grandma tunnel", Finnish: Mummotunneli) is an entity formed by two stone buildings in Kluuvi, Helsinki, Finland. The name refers also to the merchant alley stretching throughout the block. The passage is formed by the Wrede house in the corner between Pohjoisesplanadi and Mikonkatu (Pohjoisesplanadi 35) and the Central house in the corner between Aleksanterinkatu and Mikonkatu (Aleksanterinkatu 46). The building entity represents Renaissance Revival architecture and was designed and partly commissioned by architect Karl August Wrede, and built in 1888 and 1892.

== Name ==
Among architects, the entity is known as the Wrede passage, but its official Finnish name has been Vanha kauppakuja ("Old merchant passage") since a naming competition held in 1958. The name is spelled Wanha kauppakuja on top of the entrance. The passage itself is colloquially known as the "Grandma tunnel". It has terraces of several restaurants, which are said to be popular among middle-aged guests. The restaurants are maintained by Center-Inn, which was bought by HOK-Elanto in 2013.

== History ==
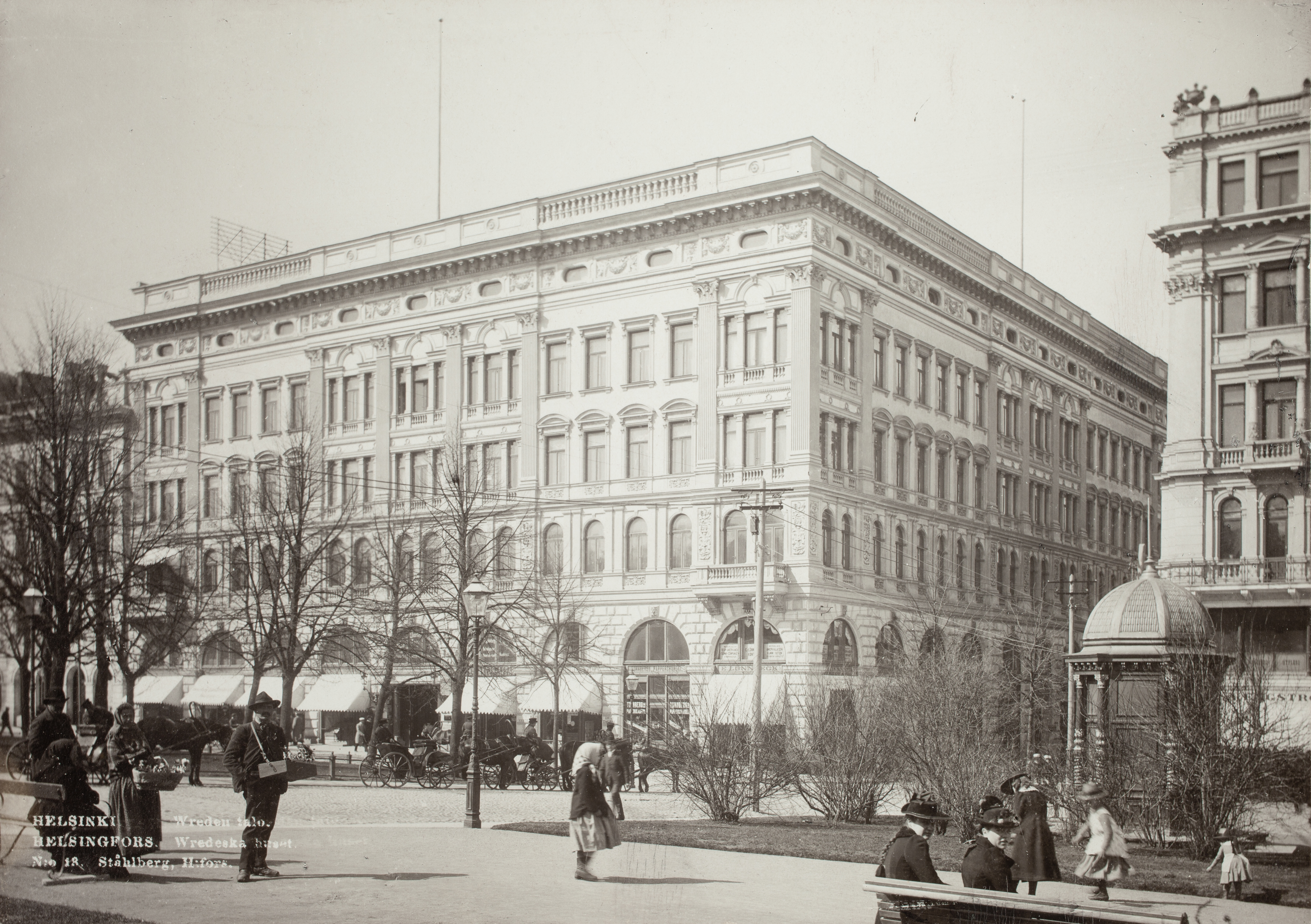
The Wrede house in the early 20th century.

Carl Ludvig Engel designed the block 95b onto reclaimed land from the former Kluuvinlahti bay from 1837 to 1838. The corner between Esplanadi and Mikonkatu previously housed a one-story residential house commissioned by professor Nils Abraham af Ursin for himself, which later became the residence of Infantry General Johan Mauritz Nordenstam. The corner of Aleksanterinkatu housed the residence of master tanner G. A. Dahl. The architect K. A. Wrede and the master builder J. H. Helenius bought the corner lot on Esplanadi with loaned money from Nordenstam's heirs and the house was built in a year and a half from 1887 to 1888. Wrede also lived in the house himself. He designed the so-called "Central house" as a continuation of the passage in 1889, which was commissioned by merchant official Julius Tallberg from 1890 to 1892. After this the passage stretched throughout the block.

In the 19th century, merchant alleys were a new building form and Wrede had become familiar with them on his journeys throughout Europe from 1885 to 1886. He might have been inspired by the merchant alleys in Brussels, Belgium that he adored, such as the Galeries Royales Saint-Hubert built in 1847. The alley in the Wrede passage, mostly acting as the inner yard of the buildings surrounding it, is 80 metres long and 8 metres wide. The alley has a uniform design, but the wall decorations on the two buildings differ. The style of the buildings represents renaissance revival architecture resembling Italian palaces, with baroque and rococo influences. The stairway of the Central house hosts magnificent wall and ceiling paintings by Salomo Wuorio, which were renovated in the 1980s.

Because of financial difficulties, Wrede had to sell his share of the Pohjoisesplanadi corner house in 1898. From 1905 to the late 1940s the building was owned by the Joutsen brothers. From 1952 to 1965 most of the shares were owned by Machinery and after that by the Säästöpankkien Keskus-Osake-Pankki (SKOP) bank, which had bought the house already in 1925. SKOP's head office was in the Aleksanterinkatu corner house from 1926 up to its bankruptcy in the 1990s.

The most part of both houses were originally in residential use, but the apartments were renovated into offices in the 1950s. The restaurant König was located in the Central house right from the start up to 2015. The Yleisradio studios were located in the building from 1927 to 1934.
