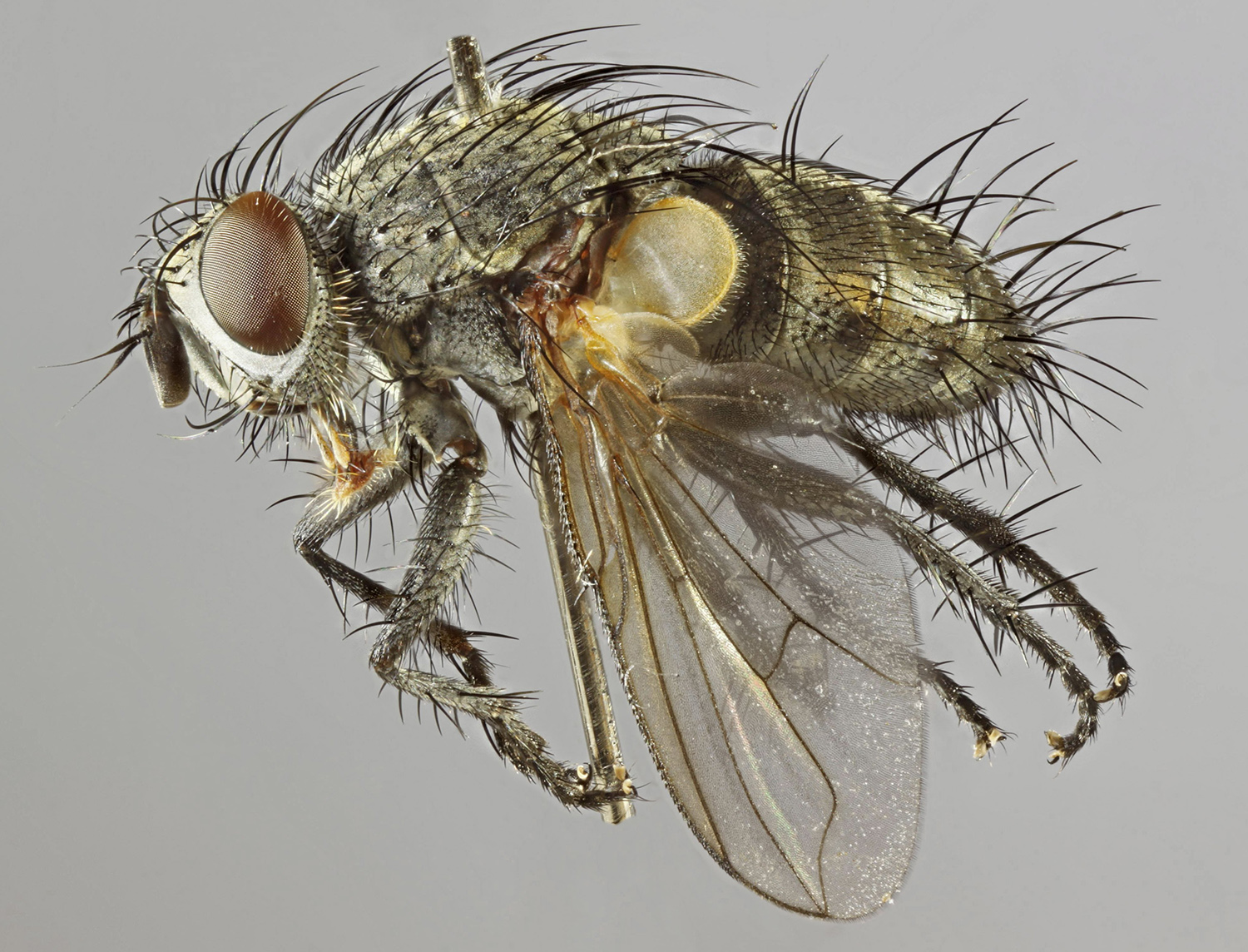
- Campylocheta inepta North Wales

Scientific classification
- Kingdom: Animalia
- Phylum: Arthropoda
- Class: Insecta
- Order: Diptera
- Family: Tachinidae
- Subfamily: Dexiinae
- Tribe: Voriini
- Genus: Campylocheta
- Species: C. inepta

Binomial name
- Campylocheta inepta (Meigen, 1824)

Synonyms
- Hypochaeta castellana Strobl, 1906; Hypochaeta longicornis Brauer & von Berganstamm, 1889; Tachina clausa Zetterstedt, 1859; Tachina distincta Meigen, 1824; Tachina inepta Meigen, 1824; Tachina pectinata Zetterstedt, 1844; Tachina unicingulata Bonsdorff, 1866; Zenillia alnicola Pandellé, 1895

= Campylocheta inepta =

Species of fly

Campylocheta inepta is a species of fly in the family Tachinidae. It is found in the Palearctic. This species is a parasite of mainly Geometridae larvae but also several other families of Lepidoptera associated with heathland and moorland. Campylocheta inepta occurs in montane areas with pine forests in most of Europe but the species is also found in lower areas in central Europe and Spain.

== Distribution ==
Turkmenistan, British Isles, Belarus, Czech Republic, Estonia, Hungary, Latvia, Lithuania, Poland, Romania, Slovakia, Ukraine, Denmark, Finland, Norway, Sweden, Andorra, Croatia, Greece, Italy, Portugal, Slovenia, Spain, Turkey, Austria, Belgium, France, Germany, Netherlands, Switzerland, Israel, North Africa, Canary Islands, Russia.
