= Johan Axel Palmén =

Finnish zoologist (1845–1919)

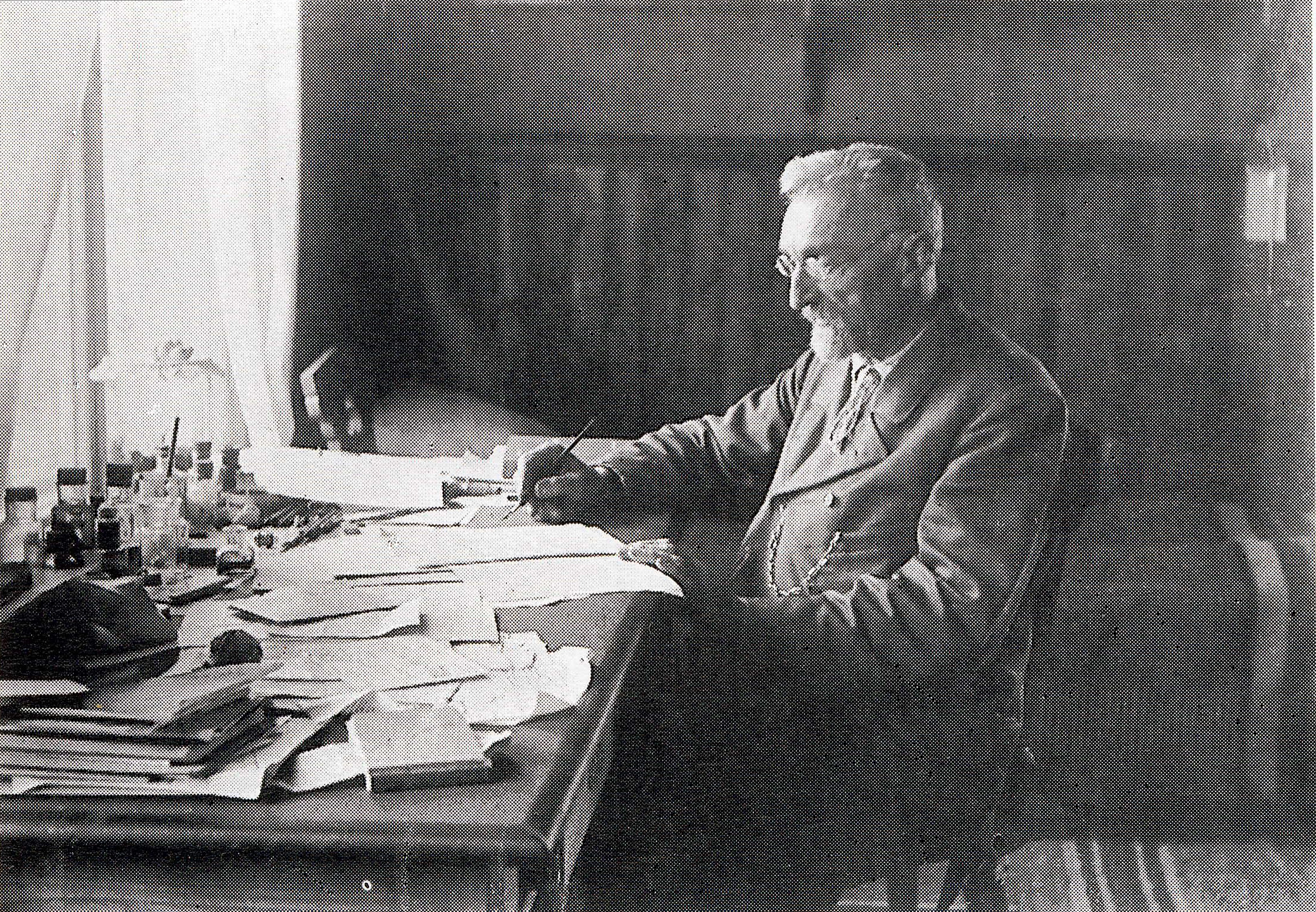
Portrait, taken somewhere between 1905 and 1908

Johan Axel Palmén (7 November 1845 – 7 April 1919) was a Finnish zoologist who was known for his studies on bird migration and for efforts in bird conservation in Finland. His studies of bird migration included the identification of flyways along which a majority of shorebirds migrated as well as the phenomenon of leap-frog migration. He established the first bird ringing station in Finland by purchasing a piece of land in the village of Tvärminne.

== Life and work ==
Palmén was born in Helsinki to law professor (Baron) Johan Philip Palmén and his wife Johanna Charlotta Bonsdorff who also came from a family of academics. His mother died when he was less than two years old and his father married again. He went to study at the Helsingfors Lyceum and became interested in science at a young age with encouragement from his uncle Evert Julius Bonsdorff who was a well-known zoologist and educationist. He became especially interested in insects as a schoolboy.

He joined university to study zoology in 1864 and worked as an extraordinary amanuensis at the zoological museum. He became a member of the Societas pro Fauna et Flora Fennica in 1865. He became a curator of the zoological collections of the society in 1867. He travelled with other students to northern Savonia in 1865 and western Lapland in 1867. He graduated in 1869 and joined for postgraduate studies in the faculty of medicine. He made a collection trip to Austria-Hungary in 1870 and helped in editing a book on Finland's birds by Magnus von Wright. This made him shift to ornithology and with the thesis Om foglarnes flyttningsvägar he received his doctorate in 1875. He studied comparative anatomy at Heidelberg under Carl Gegenbaur and took an interest in insect anatomy.

In 1876 he developed his ideas on bird migration in a German paper Über die Zugstrassen der Vögel [On the migratory flyways of birds]. He noted the phenomenon of leap-frog migration but based on his experience at some locations where shorebirds congregated along narrow migration routes, he assumed that birds continued along narrow routes throughout their migration. He returned to Finland and taught zoology, replacing the anti-evolutionist F. W. Mäklin after his death. He clashed with ideas on bird migration with the German ornithologist E. F. von Homeyer and published further clarifications and rebuttals to criticism in a 100 page publication. He popularized natural history study in schools.

In 1887 he went on an expedition to the Kola Peninsula along with several other scientists including Oswald Kairamo. He established a field research station in 1901 in the village of Tvärminne. He retired in 1908 and was involved in ringing birds until the outbreak of World War I. He was involved in nature conservation and was instrumental in the nature conservation laws of Finland passed in 1917. He was unmarried and died from bronchitis at his brother's home in Forssa. He bequeathed the Tvärminne research station and most of his possessions to the University of Helsinki.
