= Mikael Storsjö =

Finnish IT entrepreneur (born 1957)

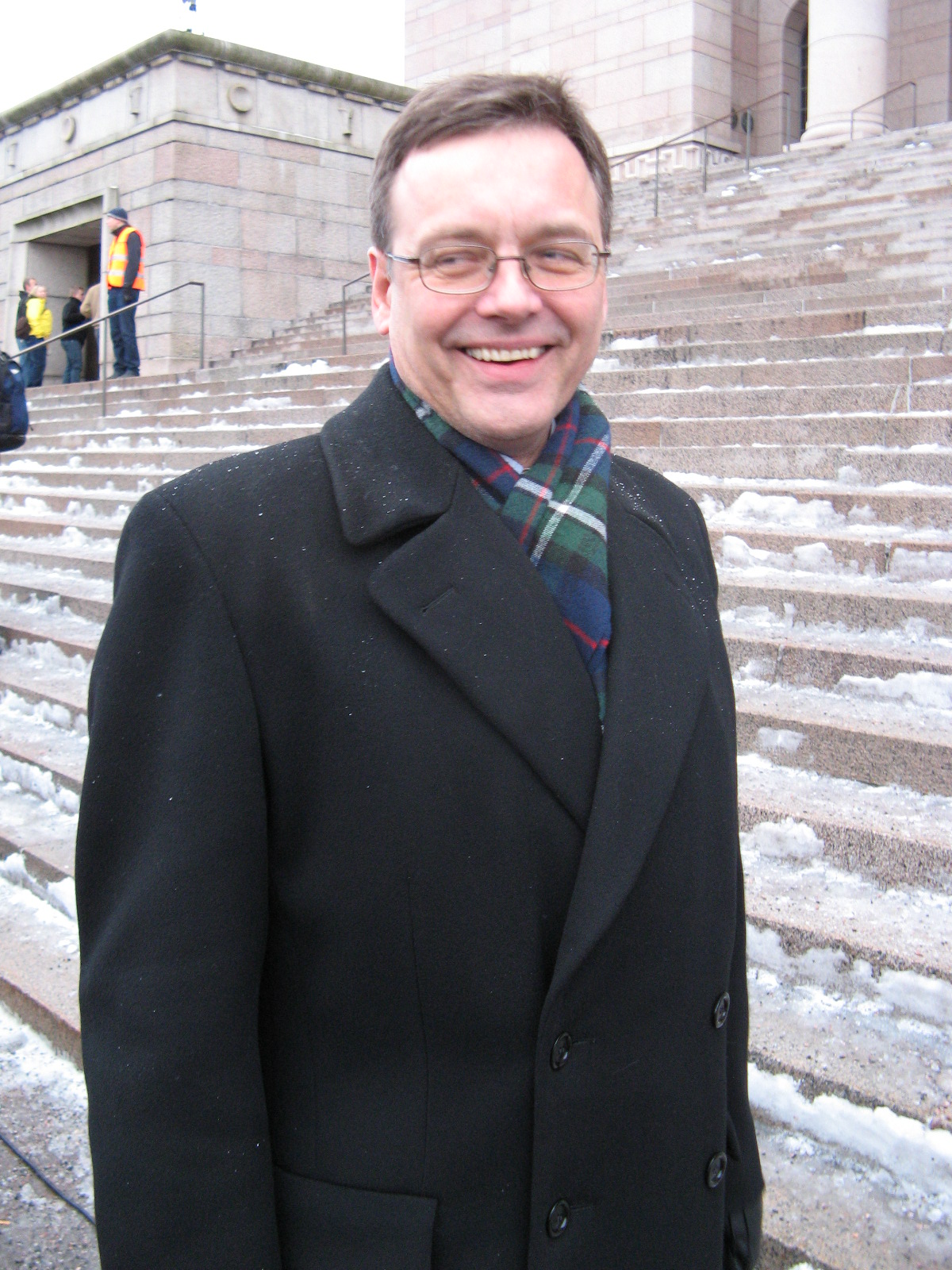
Storsjö in 2009

Mikael Storsjö (born 22 December 1957) is a Finnish IT entrepreneur, journalist and non-governmental organization activist. He is a board member of FINROSFORUM. He is known for his clashes with the Finnish and Swedish authorities concerning the hosting of the Kavkaz Center's website on his servers. In 2011–2012, he has also been involved in a court case, in which he was found guilty of arranging illegal entry into Finland of 25 Chechens.

== Hosting of Kavkaz Center in Finland ==
In Finland Storsjö became a public figure in October 2004, when the Lithuanian government banned the Kavkaz Center website, and Storsjö moved the website to his server in Finland. The Finnish Security Intelligence Service (FSIS) then confiscated his servers.

In the public discussion that then ensued, there was a general agreement that the authorities had violated the freedom of speech with their actions.

After these events, Storsjö has continued to support Kavkaz Center by offering them the use of his servers both in Finland and in Sweden.

Kavkaz Center is an internet news agency which publishes news on Chechnya and the Caucasus region from the point of view of the Mujahideen warriors. It is believed that the Kavkaz Center is in the control of the “minister of public relations” of the Chechen Republic of Ichkeria, Movladi Udugov. Udugov belongs to the Islamic warriors of the region.

The publishing activities of the Kavkaz Center are known to be a sore point for Russia, which is involved in a war in the area. Russia has tried to resort to diplomatic means in order to prevent the website from being hosted in various countries, including Sweden and Finland. The Russian foreign minister Sergei Lavrov has said that the website is being used to incite people to conduct terrorist activities. Those who defend the website, however, argue that mediation of news based on pluralistic values is the only way that both parties of the conflict can make their views known to the public.

The Kavkaz Center website was closed in Lithuania in the autumn of 2004, on request by Russia, after the Beslan school hostage crisis, when the website had published a message from Shamil Basayev, in which he assumed responsibility for the attack.

After this Storsjö offered the website the services of his servers in his web hotel. Finnish Foreign Minister Erkki Tuomioja then wrote in his own website, after he found out about the existence of the website on a Finnish server, that “[in Finland] measures were taken immediately to close down the website” and that the website had now been closed down.

One cannot accept in the name of freedom of speech any materials on the television, in the newspapers or in the internet in which people are incited to murder the president of a foreign nation or in which people who commit suicide bombings are praised.

Later Tuomioja stated that the actions by the authorities may have been initiated at the same time or after the information about the opening of the website was passed on to the foreign minister, but these actions were not based on any instructions from the Foreign Ministry, to whose jurisdiction they do not by any means belong.

According to the acting head of the FSIS, Mr. Hannu Moilanen, the actions of the security intelligence service were approved from a high level: We were in good co-operation with the head of the state, who blessed our actions and considered them quite necessary.

The Finnish Security Intelligence Service first asked the internet operator TeliaSonera to disconnect Storsjö's server from the web. TeliaSonera did not agree to this, since in their opinion the Chechen rebels website did not break any law.

After this the Finnish Security Intelligence Service asked Storsjö to remove the Kavkaz Center website from his server, but Storsjö refused to do this, citing freedom of speech as his grounds. On the following day representatives of the Security Intelligence Service went to see an associate of Storsjö in order to discuss the matter, and the associate handed the server over to the Security Intelligence Service so that they could investigate it.

Due to these events, president of the Committee on Constitutional Matters of the Finnish Parliament, MP Kimmo Sasi submitted a written question to the government on the actions of the Security Intelligence Service, to which Minister of the Interior, Mr. Kari Rajamäki replied, “that there was nothing in the actions of the Security Intelligence Service that would merit a reprimand.”

During his visit to Finland, Russian Prime Minister Mikhail Fradkov thanked Finnish Prime Minister Matti Vanhanen for having closed down the Kavkaz Centerin website. When it was no longer possible to operate in Finland, Storsjö transferred Kavkaz Center to his servers in Sweden, but when it was found out that the website was legal in Finland, he opened it on his Finnish servers.

The Russian ambassador to Finland, Mr. Vladimir Grinin then asked Finnish members of Parliament why it was allowed in Finland to keep the Kavkaz Center website on Finnish servers and nothing had been done about it. On the basis of discussion carried out by members of the public, the MPs answered him that freedom of speech is in force in Finland and that politicians cannot interfere with websites so long as no law is broken.

Storsjö has also been involved in arm wrestling with the authorities and the Russian ambassador in Sweden. However, both a court of law and the Chancellor of Justice have ruled that the contents of the website are legal and that there are no grounds on which it should be closed down.

The great amount of publicity that kavkazcenter.com got in Finland and the significance of these developments have to do with the principle of freedom of speech and questions relating to it, and thus the case was widely commented upon in the editorials of Finnish newspapers and elsewhere in the media. This discussion has helped to draw the line at which the authority of courts of law and the police ends in matters relating to freedom of speech.

== Alleged Financial Support for Chechen Terrorists ==
Storsjö said in May 2005 an interview with Turun Sanomat that he is collecting money through donations that anyone can make to an association called “Support for information service on the Caucasus”, from which moneys are directed to the support of Kavkaz Center. He did, however, admit that the moneys end up with Chechen rebels, among whom there are “elements that have tendencies towards terrorism.” The matter was first made public by Aamulehti, and Storsjö said that this was a false report, since no association called “Support for information service on the Caucasus” ever has existed. It is not possible to find out anything about this alleged association with the Google search engine, and no such association exists in the Finnish Register for Associations.

== Apprehension on Odesa ==
Ukrainian authorities apprehended Storsjö in Odesa on 26 May 2008 because he was on the list of personae non gratae in the Russian Federation. Storsjö was released from jail on 28 May 2008 and the Ukrainian authorities had cause to review their practises concerning lists of personae non gratae.

== Court Case Concerning Alleged Organisation of Chechens’ Illegal Entry into Finland ==
In early June 2009, Storsjö declared that he had arranged the entry into Finland of around 50 Chechens who had been living in exile in Turkey. He said the Finnish Border Guard suspected him of arranging a gross illegal entry to Finland in April 2009.

In a court case that began on 24 March 2011 in the Vantaa Local Court, the prosecutor Mikko Sipila accused Storsjö altogether of three cases of arranging an illegal entry, of which one he considered to be a gross one. He demanded that Storsjö be given a jail sentence. The alleged crimes had taken place from 2007 to 2010. According to the prosecution, Storsjö had brought 22 Chechens from Turkey to Finland on three separate occasions, and 9 of these people had been minors. None of these people had carried travel documents that would have entitled them to enter Finland. The prosecution also deemed that even though Storsjö had not benefited from this activity financially, he had reaped benefits in other ways, such as gaining a reputation and the respect of certain circles.”

Storsjö denied having benefited from gains in reputation. He had publicly disclosed his activities only after the Border Guard had released statements to the effect that they suspected him of committing crimes. In fact he had only had losses from his activism, since he had paid the air fares of the Chechens from Istanbul via Helsinki to St. Petersburg from his own and his company’s funds. Storsjö denied having broken Finnish law. According to him the criminal law allows the arrangement of entry to foreigners when there are acceptable grounds for such action. “I have decided to help these people, and I have done so fully conscious of the risks on my part.”

The court case concluded on 9 May 2011. Storsjö was acquitted of all charges. The court held that his activity had not been of criminal kind, but that there had been acceptable grounds for it. The judge referred to the same section of the law that Storsjö had cited in court. The judge considered that Storsjö's grounds for his activity were credible: this was a case of humanitarian activity based on empathy. The judge considered that the Chechens really were in need of protection, since nearly all of them had already been awarded asylum in Finland. The judge also considered that Storsjö had not benefited personally from his activism; on the contrary, he had received various threats because of it.

The prosecutor had stated that he shall appeal the decision and the case may yet continue in the Hovrätt, that is, The Court of Appeals. In June 2012, it reversed the lower court's decision and handed down a four-month suspended sentence, ruling that the Chechens were not in danger. Storsjö plans to appeal to the Supreme Court of Finland.
