= Hwasser =

Hwasser is a Swedish family name, which originated with Börje Larsson Hwass (died 1686). The last male bearer of the name died in 1914.

Members of the family included

- Elise Hwasser (1831–1894), actress
- Israel Hwasser (1790–1860), physician
