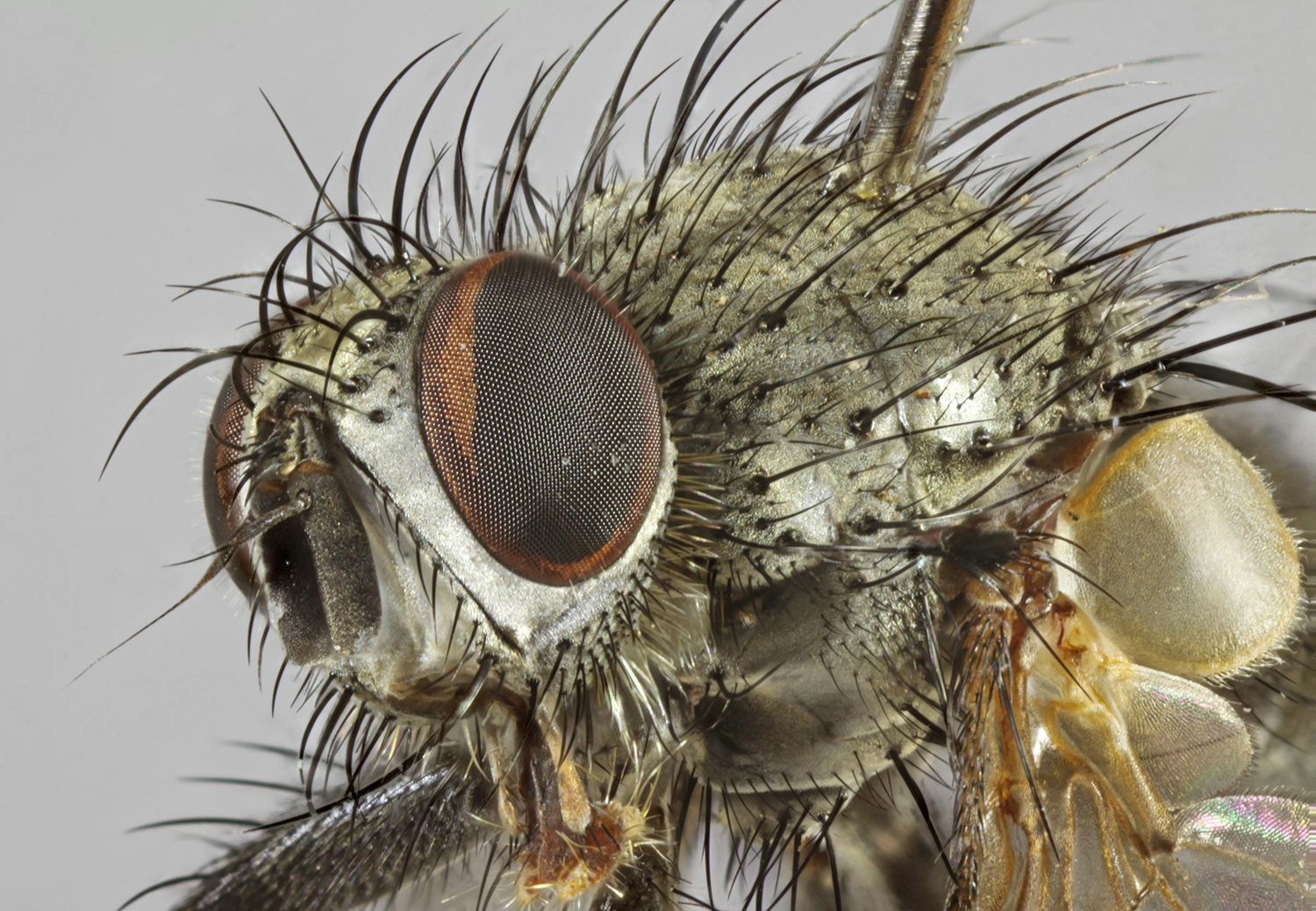
- Campylocheta inepta

Scientific classification
- Kingdom: Animalia
- Phylum: Arthropoda
- Clade: Pancrustacea
- Class: Insecta
- Order: Diptera
- Family: Tachinidae
- Subfamily: Dexiinae
- Tribe: Voriini
- Genus: Campylocheta; Rondani, 1859

Type species
- Tachina schistacea Meigen, 1824

Synonyms
- Campylochaeta Bezzi & Stein, 1907; Campylochaeta Scudder, 1882; Chaetophlepsis Townsend, 1915; Coloradalia Curran, 1934; Elpe Robineau-Desvoidy, 1863; Gaedartia Robineau-Desvoidy, 1863; Goedartia Bezzi, 1907; Hypochaeta Brauer & von Berganstamm, 1889

= Campylocheta =

Genus of flies

Campylocheta is a genus of flies in the family Tachinidae.

== Species ==
- Campylocheta abdominalis Shima, 1985
- Campylocheta albiceps (Macquart, 1851)
- Campylocheta angustifrons (Mesnil, 1952)
- Campylocheta aperta Dear & Crosskey, 1982
- Campylocheta argenticeps Shima, 1985
- Campylocheta atriceps (Reinhard, 1952)
- Campylocheta bicoloripes (Mesnil, 1970)
- Campylocheta bisetosa Shima, 1985
- Campylocheta canora (Reinhard, 1952)
- Campylocheta confusa Ziegler, 1996
- Campylocheta dentifera Richter, 1981
- Campylocheta eudryae (Smith, 1916)
- Campylocheta flaviceps Shima, 1985
- Campylocheta fuscinervis (Stein, 1924)
- Campylocheta grisea Shima, 1985
- Campylocheta hirticeps Shima, 1985
- Campylocheta inclinata (Villeneuve, 1915)
- Campylocheta inepta (Meigen, 1824)
- Campylocheta latifrons Zhang & Zhou, 2011
- Campylocheta maculosa Zhang & Zhou, 2011
- Campylocheta magnicauda Shima, 1988
- Campylocheta malaisei (Mesnil, 1953)
- Campylocheta mariae Bystrowski, 2001
- Campylocheta membrana Dear & Crosskey, 1982
- Campylocheta nasellensis (Reinhard, 1952)
- Campylocheta orbitalis (Webber, 1931)
- Campylocheta orientalis (Townsend, 1928)
- Campylocheta plathypenae (Sabrosky, 1975)
- Campylocheta plumbea (Mesnil, 1952)
- Campylocheta polita (Brooks, 1945)
- Campylocheta praecox (Meigen, 1824)
- Campylocheta rindgei (Reinhard, 1952)
- Campylocheta risbeci (Mesnil, 1944)
- Campylocheta semiothisae (Brooks, 1945)
- Campylocheta similis Ziegler & Shima, 1996
- Campylocheta siphonion Dear & Crosskey, 1982
- Campylocheta suwai Shima, 1985
- Campylocheta teliosis (Reinhard, 1952)
- Campylocheta townsendi (Smith, 1916)
- Campylocheta ziegleri Tschorsnig, 2002
