= Anjala =

Former municipality of Finland

Coordinates: 60.68873°N 26.80793°E

Coat of arms of Anjala

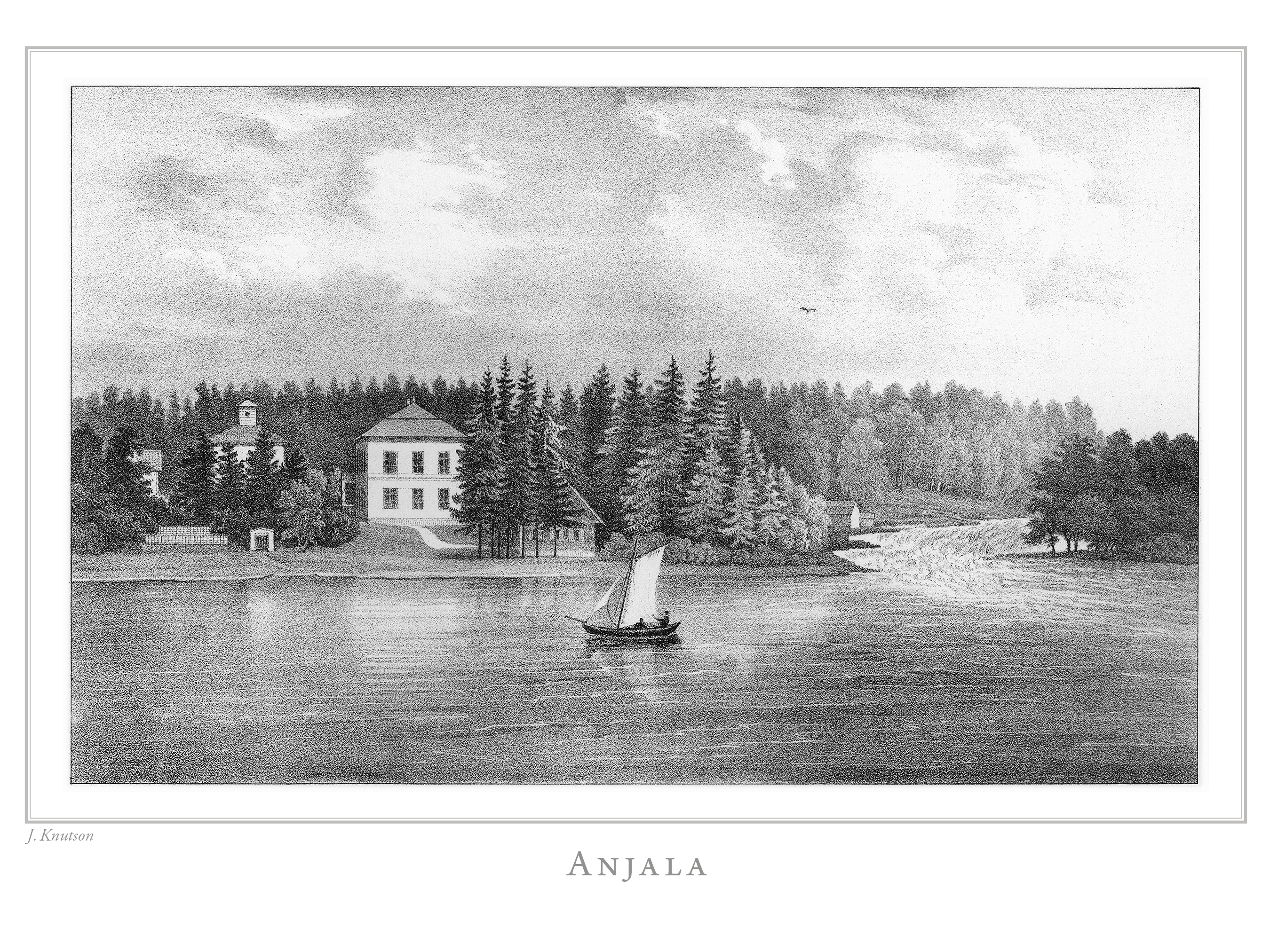
Illustration of Anjala manor in Finland framstäldt i teckningar edited by Zacharias Topelius and published 1845-1852.

Anjala was a town in Kymenlaakso, Southern Finland, which merged in 1975 with Sippola to form Anjalankoski, and in 2009 further merged into Kouvola. It neighbours Inkeroinen via a bridge on the main road which runs through the two settlements crossing the Kymijoki river, which flows to the east of Anjala and to the south-west of Inkeroinen. It is approximately 35km north-west of Kotka, 25km south-east of Kouvola, and 118km north-east of Helsinki.

Anjala is remembered historically in connection with the 18th-century event known as the Anjala Conspiracy.

The Regina School, one of the country's first public schools, was located here, as was its library, which was the first in the country. They were founded by Rabbe Gottlieb Wrede with the help of the Christian educational society Pro Fide et Christianismo, of which he was a member.

Currently, the town features many facilities including a swimming lake, a church, a small K-Market grocery store, a BestDrive by Continental garage, a Neste gas station with a car wash, cafe and, in summers, ice cream stall, and a cultural museum.

== People born in Anjala ==
- Gustaf Philip Creutz (1731–1785)
- Jouko Jääskeläinen (b. 1952)
- Kari Rajamäki (b. 1948)
- Karl August Wrede (1859-1943)
- Otto Wrede (1851–1936)
- Rabbe Axel Wrede (1851-1938)
