= Rabbe Axel Wrede =

Finnish jurist and politician (1851–1938)

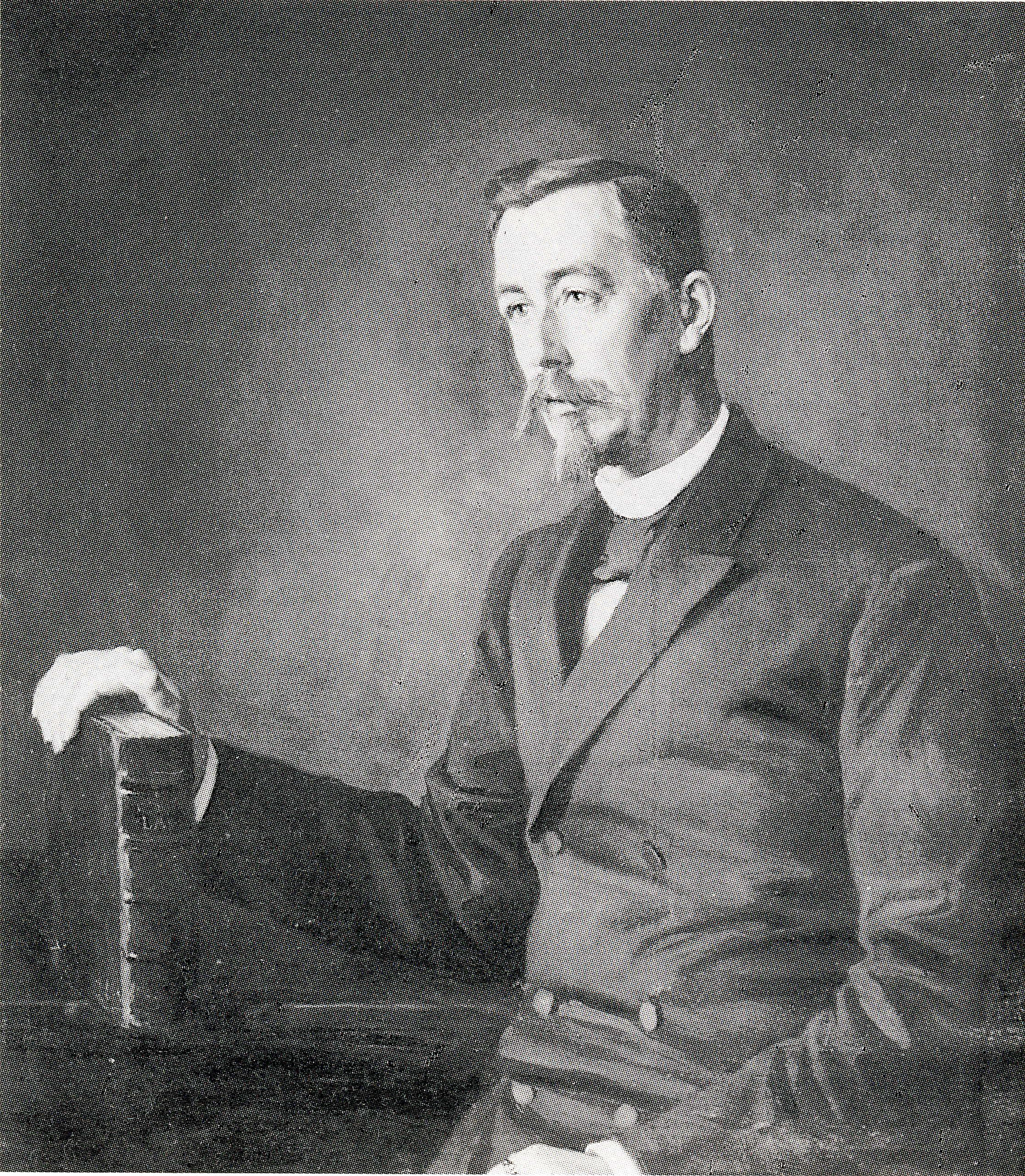
- R. A. Wrede by Edelfelt (1896)
- Born: Rabbe Axel Wrede af Elimä; July 16, 1851; Anjala, Grand Duchy of Finland
- Died: February 16, 1938 (aged 86); Anjala, Finland
- Education: Doctor of Laws, University of Helsinki (1884)
- Alma mater: University of Helsinki
- Occupations: Jurist, politician, professor
- Spouse: Johanna Sofia Paulina Wrede (m. 1879)
- Awards: Foreign member of the Royal Swedish Academy of Sciences (1924)

Baron Rabbe Axel (R. A.) Wrede af Elimä (16 July 1851 – 16 February 1938) was a Finnish jurist and politician, born in Anjala. He was born into a Finland-Swedish noble family, the Wrede af Elimä. He was a professor at the University of Helsinki from 1885 to 1909 and made procedural law an independent discipline in Finland. He was a member of the Diet of Finland from 1877 to 1906 and of the Parliament of Finland from 1910 to 1913 and from 1917 to 1919, representing the Swedish People's Party of Finland.

== Biography ==
His father, Henrik August Wrede, was a lawyer and member of Parliament, and his mother was Anna Baeckman. His brother, Karl August Wrede, was an architect. He married Johanna Sofia Paulina Wrede in 1879. The couple had three children: Anna Helena (b. 1880), Rabbe Fabian (b. 1882) and Henrik August (b. 1884).

=== Academic career ===
Wrede graduated with a Bachelor of Arts degree in juris utriusque in 1879 and then studied with Adolf Wach in Leipzig and Oskar von Bülow in Tübingen. He became a Doctor of Laws in 1884 with the thesis Om kvittning enligt finsk rätt (On set-off according to Finnish Law). He qualified for the professorship with the work Processinvändningarna enligt finsk allmän civilprocessrätt (1884). After competing for the post with Julian Serlachius, he was appointed professor of civil law and Roman law at the University of Helsinki in 1885. When the chair was divided in 1898, Wrede chose the professorship in civil procedure, Roman law and legal encyclopaedia, which he held until 1909.

Wrede became rector of the University of Helsinki in 1905. He was chancellor of Åbo Akademi University from 1918 to 1930.

Rabbe Wrede has had a great influence on Finnish law and enjoyed great international recognition as a proceduralist. Thanks to Wrede, procedural law became an independent discipline in Finland, and his influence also extended to Sweden. According to Otto Hjalmar Granfelt, the current Finnish civil procedural law was his most important work, and according to Karl Söderholm, he is one of the foremost legal writers in Finland.

=== Political career ===
Rabbe Wrede belonged to the knighthood and nobility at all the Diets from 1877 to 1906. He was chairman of the Law Committee in 1888, 1894 and 1900 and of the Constitutional Committee in 1911, 1912 and 1918. In 1893–1900 he headed the Committee for the Reorganization of the Judicial System.

He was one of the founders of the Swedish People's Party and was also active in the interest group Swedish Assembly of Finland. In the publication Vår nationalitetsfråga he argued that the Finland Swedes should undertake public duties, so as to not become isolated from the Finnish-speaking majority.

Following the first elections to the unicameral parliament, two distinct camps emerged within the Senate: a "parliamentary" faction grouped around K. J. Ståhlberg, and a grouping led by Wrede that rejected parliamentarism outright. Wrede advocated a bicameral system, but universal and equal suffrage was introduced in the elections of a unicameral parliament. He participated in the committee under Ståhlberg's leadership that drafted a new constitution at Wredeby in Anjala in the summer of 1917, where he unsuccessfully tried to push through a monarchical form of government. From 1910–1913 and 1917–1918 he was a member of the unicameral parliament.

=== Resistance against Russification ===
He represented the Finland-Swedish community and the resistance to Russia. During the Russification period, he was chairman of the legal committee of the passive resistance and collaborated with the Kagal. After publicly criticizing the Conscription Act as unconstitutional, the Russian Minister of the Interior Vyacheslav von Plehve had him arrested and taken to Saint Petersburg in 1904, after which he was exiled to Reval. He was allowed to return in 1905, when he was elected rector of the University of Helsinki. From December 1905 to June 1909, he was vice-chairman of the Senate's Department of Justice (equivalent to the Supreme Court). He resigned together with other members in protest against the emperor's interpretation of the constitution in connection with the issuance of the Lease Ordinance.

=== Honours ===
He received an honorary doctorate in 1918 at Lund University, in 1924 in Hamburg, in 1926 in Munich, and in 1932 at the University of Helsinki. He became a foreign member of the Swedish Academy of Sciences in 1924.

== Bibliography ==
- Om kvittning enligt finsk rätt (1883)
- Processinvändningarna enligt finsk allmän civilprocessrätt (1884)
- Några drag ur Finlands samhällsskick (1900)
- Finlands gällande civilprocessrätt I (1905)
- Finlands gällande civilprocessrätt II (1910)
- Matthias Calonius (1917)
- Själfständighetsfrågan och Finlands landtdag (1917)
- Grunddragen av Finlands processrätt (1919)
- Grunddragen av Finlands rätts- och samhällsordning. Handbok för medborgare I−II (1921).
- Das Zivilprozessrecht der Kulturstaaten (1924)
