= Campylocheta teliosis =

Scientific classification
- Kingdom: Animalia
- Phylum: Arthropoda
- Class: Insecta
- Order: Diptera
- Family: Tachinidae
- Subfamily: Dexiinae
- Tribe: Voriini
- Genus: Campylocheta
- Species: C. teliosis

Binomial name
- Campylocheta teliosis (Reinhard, 1952)

Synonyms
- Chaetophlepsis teliosis Reinhard, 1952

Species of fly

Campylocheta teliosis is a species of fly in the family Tachinidae.

== Distribution ==
Canada, United States.
