= Immanuel Ilmoni =

Finnish doctor and naturalist (1797–1856)

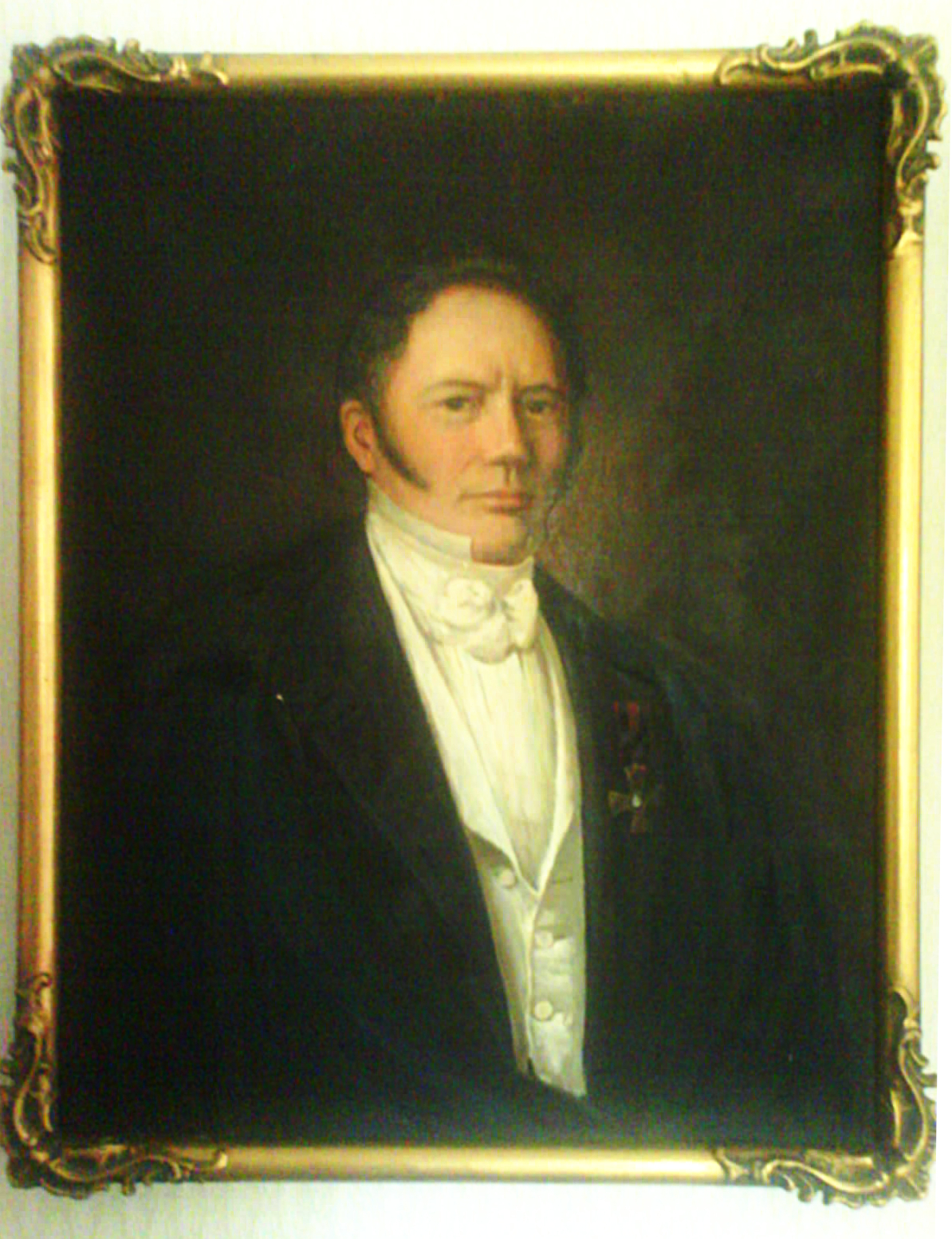
Portrait at the University of Helsinki attributed to Johan Erik Lindh

Immanuel Ilmoni born Ilmonius (29 March 1797 – 14 April 1856) was a Finnish medical doctor, naturalist, and professor of theoretical and practical medicine at the University of Helsinki. He also wrote on the history of epidemics and diseases in Scandinavia as well as some works of fiction and poetry.

== Life and work ==
Ilmoni was born in Nummi in Lohja parish to the carpenter family of Kristian and Fredrika Lovisa Woivalén. He studied at Porvoo and Turku before entering university in 1814. He received a bachelor of philosophy in 1817 and a masters in 1819. He attended the lectures of Israel Hwasser at Turku Academy and became interested in natural philosophy. He moved to Stockholm and studied surgery and obstetrics (apart from travels in Germany, Italy and France) before returning to Turku to receive his medical license in 1824. He received a position at the medical college as an extraordinary chancellor. His work on comparative anatomy of the bones led to the publication of Physiologia systematis ossium and he became an assistant professor of anatomy at the Turku Academy in 1826. He presided over the Finnish Medical Society in 1838, 1843 and 1846. He also was member of the Uppsala Science Society and the Leopoldina Academy. The Turku fire of 1827 led to a period of uncertainty during which he travelled to Germany, Austria, Italy, Switzerland, France and England. He met many of scholars of the period including Goethe, Hegel, Alexander von Humboldt and Cuvier. He became a full professor in 1831.

Ilmoni had developed a fever doctrine and in his view nature was a compound organism with parts and wholes following similar laws. Disease for him was an organism and like a magnet there were two poles to a disease.

Ilmoni died during the typhoid epidemic in Helsinki of March 1856. He was buried in the family grave in Nummi.
