= Otto Wrede =

Finnish politician (1851–1936)

Otto Wrede (2 September 1851 in Anjala – 15 February 1936) was a Finnish politician. He was a member of the Senate of Finland.
