= Campylocheta eudryae =

Scientific classification
- Kingdom: Animalia
- Phylum: Arthropoda
- Class: Insecta
- Order: Diptera
- Family: Tachinidae
- Subfamily: Dexiinae
- Tribe: Voriini
- Genus: Campylocheta
- Species: C. eudryae

Binomial name
- Campylocheta eudryae (Smith, 1916)

Synonyms
- Coloradalia ocellaris Curran, 1934; Hypochaeta eudryae Smith, 1916

Species of fly

Campylocheta eudryae is a species of fly in the family Tachinidae.

== Distribution ==
Canada, United States
