= Karl August Wrede =

Finnish architect (1859–1943)

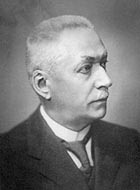
- Born: 18 September 1859; Anjala, Grand Duchy of Finland
- Died: 25 May 1943 (aged 83); Huopalahti Parish, Finland

Karl August Wrede af Elimä (18 September 1859 – 25 May 1943) was a Finnish architect. His buildings are mostly in the Neo-Renaissance and Neo-Gothic styles.

== Biography ==
He was born into a Swedish-speaking Finnish noble family, the Wrede af Elimä, at their manor home. His father, Henrik August Wrede, was a lawyer and member of Parliament. His brother, Rabbe Axel Wrede, followed in their father's career path. After their mother's early death, they lived at a private boarding school.

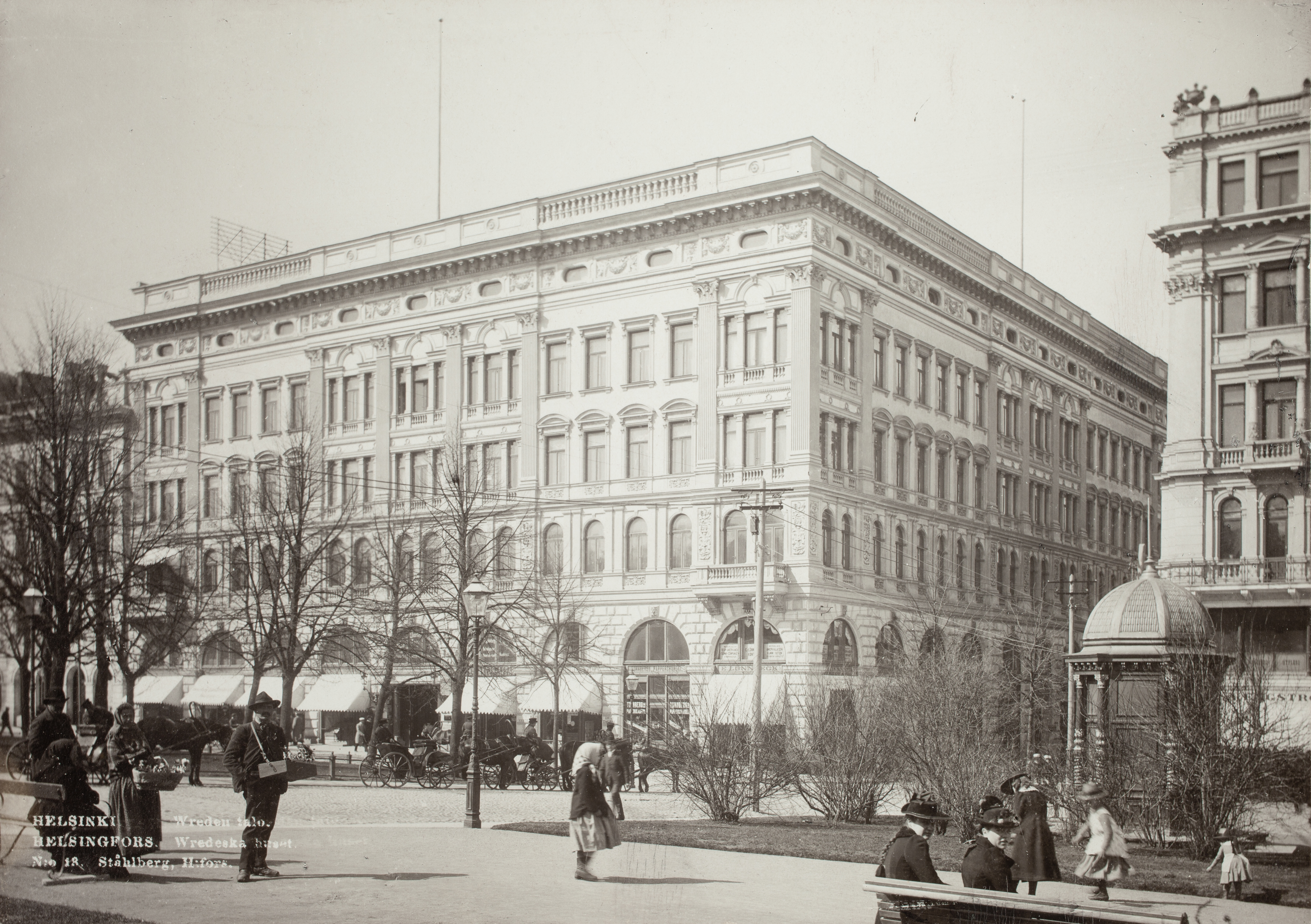
"Wrede's Passage"

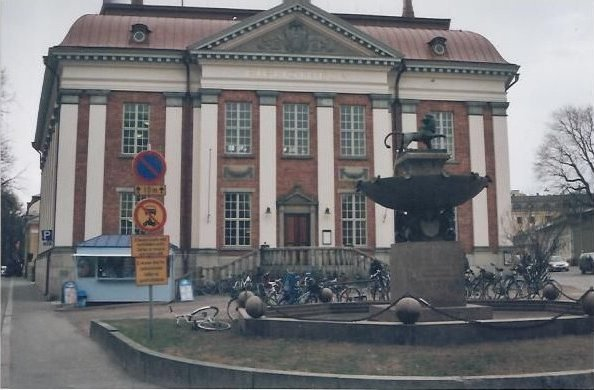
Turku City Library

In 1877, he became a student at the Svenska normallyceum i Helsingfors, followed by studies at the University of Helsinki. From there, he moved to Dresden Polytechnic; graduating with a degree in architecture in 1882. He then worked for the Board of Public Building; from 1883 to 1887 in Viipuri Province then, from 1893 to 1918, in Uusimaa Province. From 1913, he was responsible for buildings managed by the Agricultural Board

In 1888, he married Gertrud Maria von Rettig (1868-1943), daughter of the tobacco manufacturer, Fredric von Rettig, whom he met while working on a project in Turku. They had four children. She was, in part, the inspiration for his religious revival, beginning in 1894, when they were living in Vyborg and the Governor, Axel Gripenberg, invited them to a Christian salon. This led to an enthusiastic support for missionary work. He also participated directly in the activities of the Helsinki City Mission and designed a prayer room for them in Punavuori.

From 1908 to 1943, he and his family lived in the Haaga neighborhood of Helsinki. Their home was demolished in 1958, but its location has been marked with a memorial plaque since 1966.

Virtually all of his notable work was the product of private commissions, and he was disappointed by the modest nature of his career as a civil servant; being largely involved in the repair of government buildings. During his early years, he was only allowed to design a wooden pilot tower and two clergy houses. He applied for the position of First Architect several times; the last in 1917.

His first major personal project was an apartment building, now known as the Heikel House (1886). His most familiar work is what would now be known as a mixed-use development; a combination residential and commercial structure, with one of Europe's first arcades, that has come to be called "Wrede passage" (1892). He was also one of the initial shareholders, but had to sell his shares in 1898. This project required all of his attention, so he was absent from the Board of Public Building from 1887 to 1893. He came in second in a design competition for the Turku Main Library in 1899, but most of his elements were incorporated into the final design. The building was largely financed by his father-in-law, Von Rettig. Much of his later work involved villas and mansions for wealthy families; including over a dozen buildings for the Sinebrychoff family. Less well-known is that he designed several church related structures, without compensation. His last significant work was a harbor warehouse in Lahdenpohja (1916).

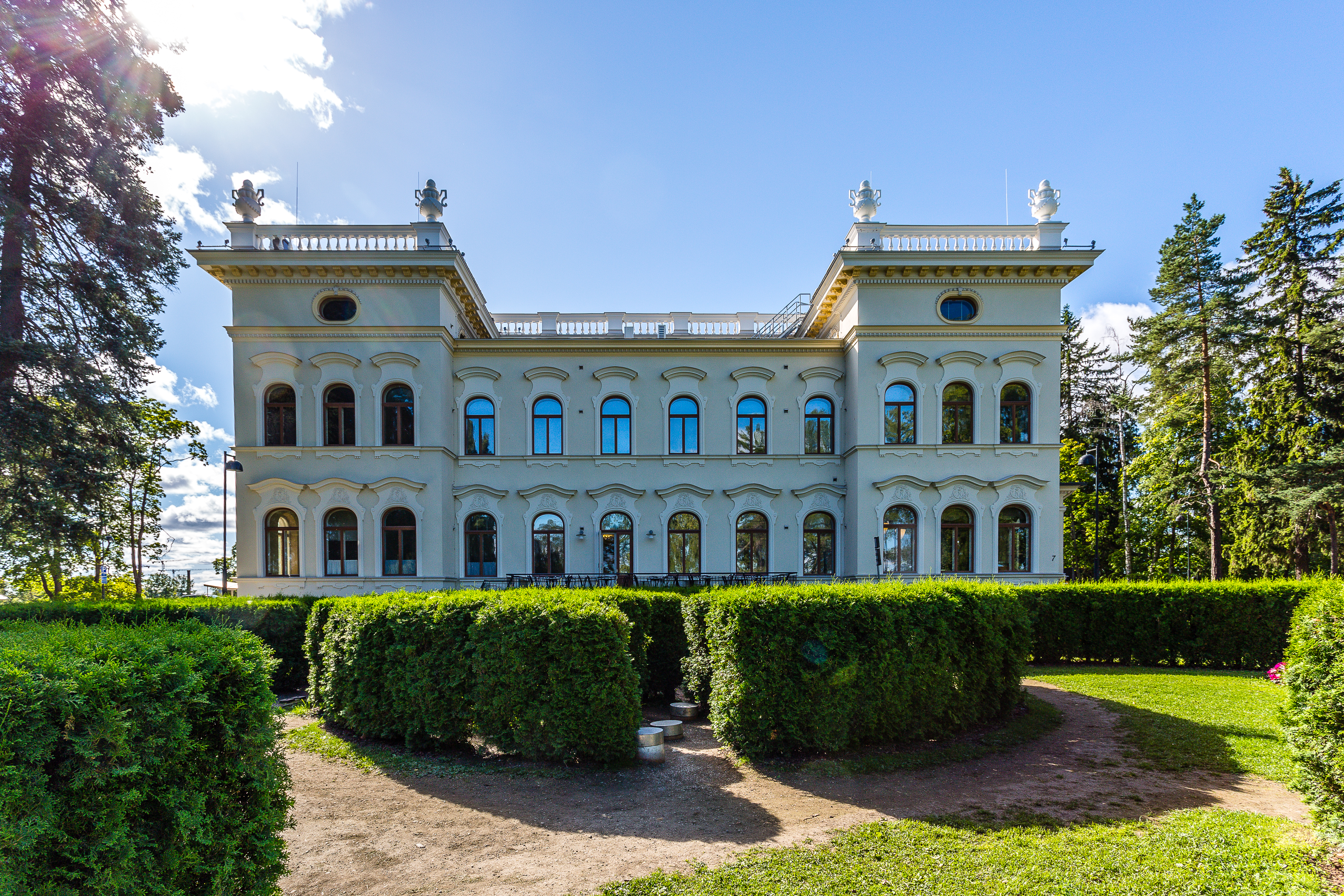
Näsilinna, a mansion in Tampere. Occupied by the Red Cross in World War I, and troops in World War, it now serves as a museum.
