= Campylocheta praecox =

Scientific classification
- Kingdom: Animalia
- Phylum: Arthropoda
- Class: Insecta
- Order: Diptera
- Family: Tachinidae
- Subfamily: Dexiinae
- Tribe: Voriini
- Genus: Campylocheta
- Species: C. praecox

Binomial name
- Campylocheta praecox (Meigen, 1824)

Synonyms
- Gaedartia praecox Robineau-Desvoidy, 1863; Gaedartia tibialis Robineau-Desvoidy, 1863; Tachina pantherina Zetterstedt, 1844; Tachina praecox Meigen, 1824

Species of fly

Campylocheta praecox is a species of fly in the family Tachinidae.

== Distribution ==
British Isles, Czech Republic, Hungary, Lithuania, Poland, Slovakia, Ukraine, Denmark, Finland, Norway, Sweden, Greece, Italy, Serbia, Spain, Turkey, Austria, Belgium, France, Germany, Netherlands, Switzerland, Russia.
