= Campylocheta townsendi =

Scientific classification
- Kingdom: Animalia
- Phylum: Arthropoda
- Class: Insecta
- Order: Diptera
- Family: Tachinidae
- Subfamily: Dexiinae
- Tribe: Voriini
- Genus: Campylocheta
- Species: C. townsendi

Binomial name
- Campylocheta townsendi (Smith, 1916)

Synonyms
- Hypochaeta townsendi Smith, 1916

Species of fly

Campylocheta townsendi is a species of fly in the family Tachinidae.

== Distribution ==
United States.
