= Magnus von Wright =

Swedish-Finnish painter

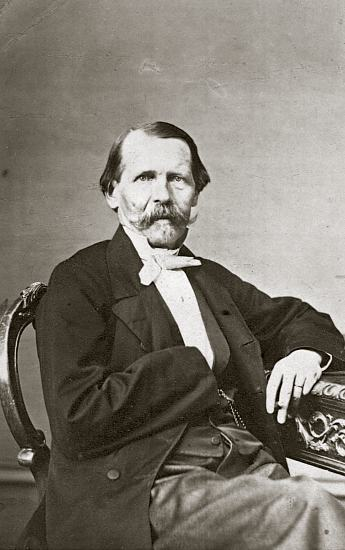
Magnus von Wright (1860s)

Magnus von Wright (13 June 1805 – 5 July 1868) was a Finnish painter and educator. In addition to bird illustrations, he was also known for his landscapes. He was one of the four sibling von Wright artists.

== Biography ==
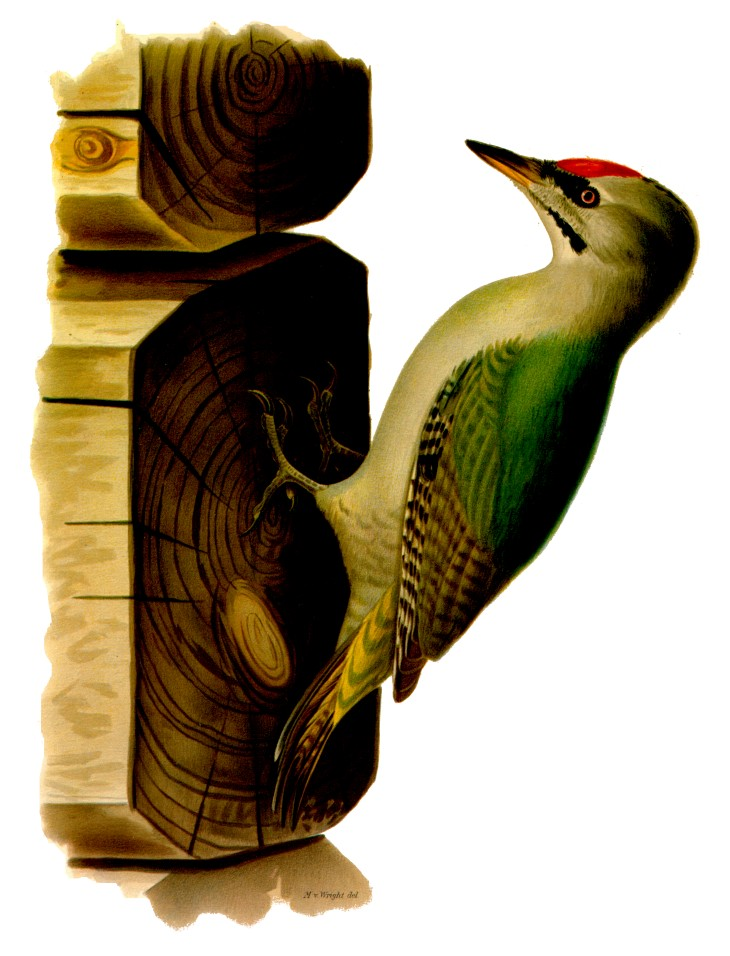
Picus canus

Magnus von Wright was born at the village of Haminalahti in Kuopio, Finland. He was a Swedish-speaking Finn. His ancestors included Scottish merchants who had settled in Narva during the 17th-century. His father Henrik Magnus von Wright was a retired Major who owned the family estate, Haminalahden. He was the eldest in a family of nine surviving children. His brothers Wilhelm von Wright (1810–1887) and Ferdinand von Wright (1822-1906) also became artists.

He attended high school in Turku Gymnasium from 1823–25. It was there that he first developed his interest in birds and, although not a university student, was able to join the scientific society Societas pro Fauna and Flora Fennica organized by Carl Reinhold Sahlberg (1779-1860).

From 1823 to 1825, he attended the Royal Swedish Academy of Arts in Stockholm and studied privately with Carl Johan Fahlcrantz (1774-1861). He was also permitted to study the ornithological collection at the Royal Swedish Academy of Sciences.

His first professional work came when he was asked to provide illustrations for Otava eli suomalaisia huvituksia (Stockholm: C. A. Gottlund. 1828), a three-volume compendium of Finnish culture and history, prepared and published by Carl Axel Gottlund (1779–1860).

After completing his work on Otava, he was employed by Swedish ornithologist Nils Bonde. Assisted by his brother Wilhelm, he provided illustrations for the multi-volume Svenska Fåglar (Stockholm: C. von Scheele. 1828). He apparently was the first in Sweden to use the new lithographic technique for printing bird illustrations.

Upon his return to Finland, he worked as a cartographer for the land survey office. From 1845 to 1849, he was a taxidermist at the University of Helsinki's Zoological Museum, working with Evert Julius Bonsdorff, and taught drawing at the University from 1849 to 1868.

In 1857, he made a study trip to Düsseldorf, Kingdom of Prussia, where he created a series of still-lifes. Two years later, he published his own work on Finnish birds. He also spent many years helping to reconstruct the botanical and zoological collections that had been destroyed in the Great Fire of Turku. His paintings of Helsinki and its environs are considered to be of great historical value.

In 1846, he was elected to the board of directors of the Finnish Art Association and held this position until his death in 1868 at Helsinki.

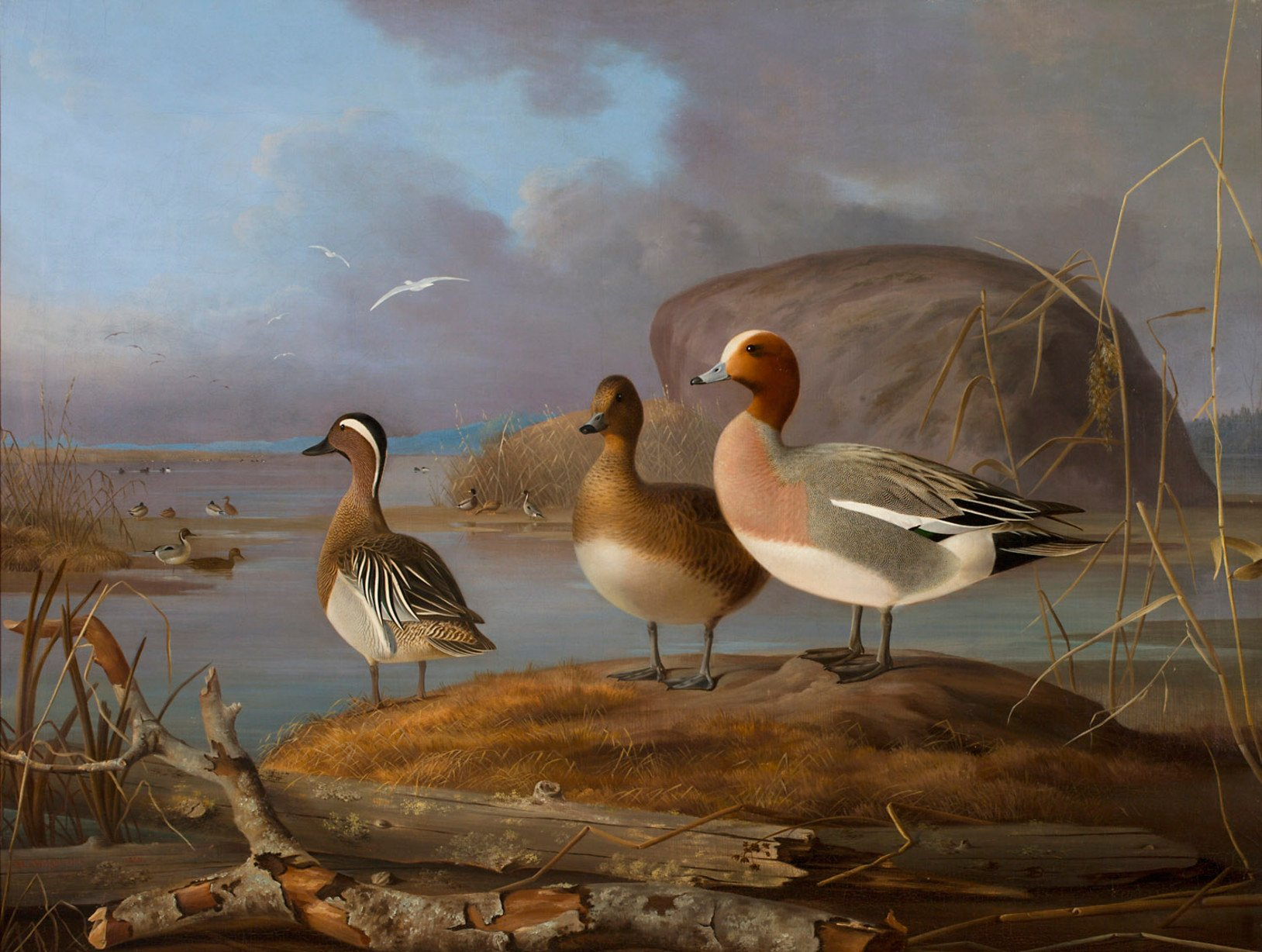
Wigeons and a teal

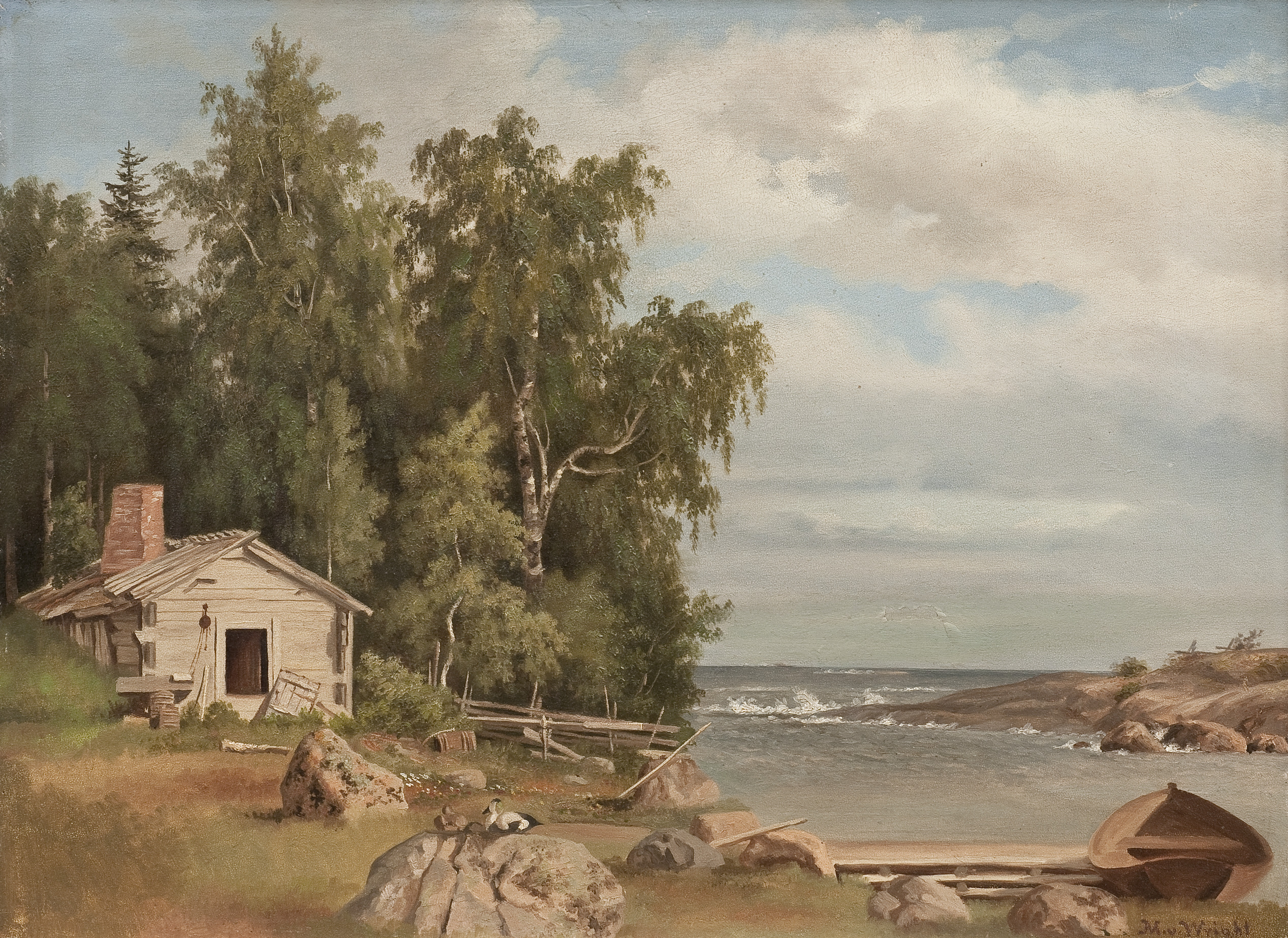
Beach Landscape from Lövö

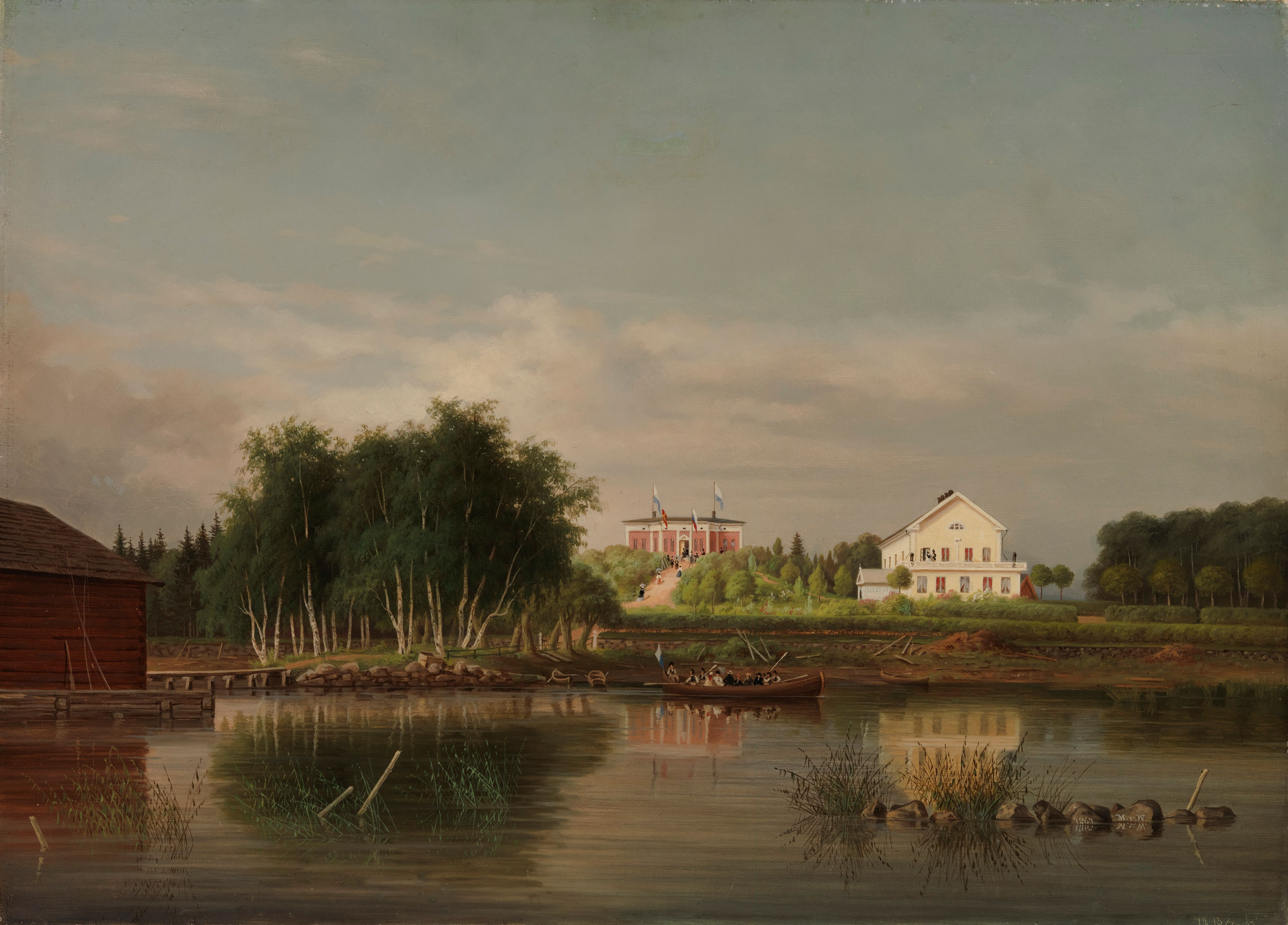
Honkola Manor in Urjala

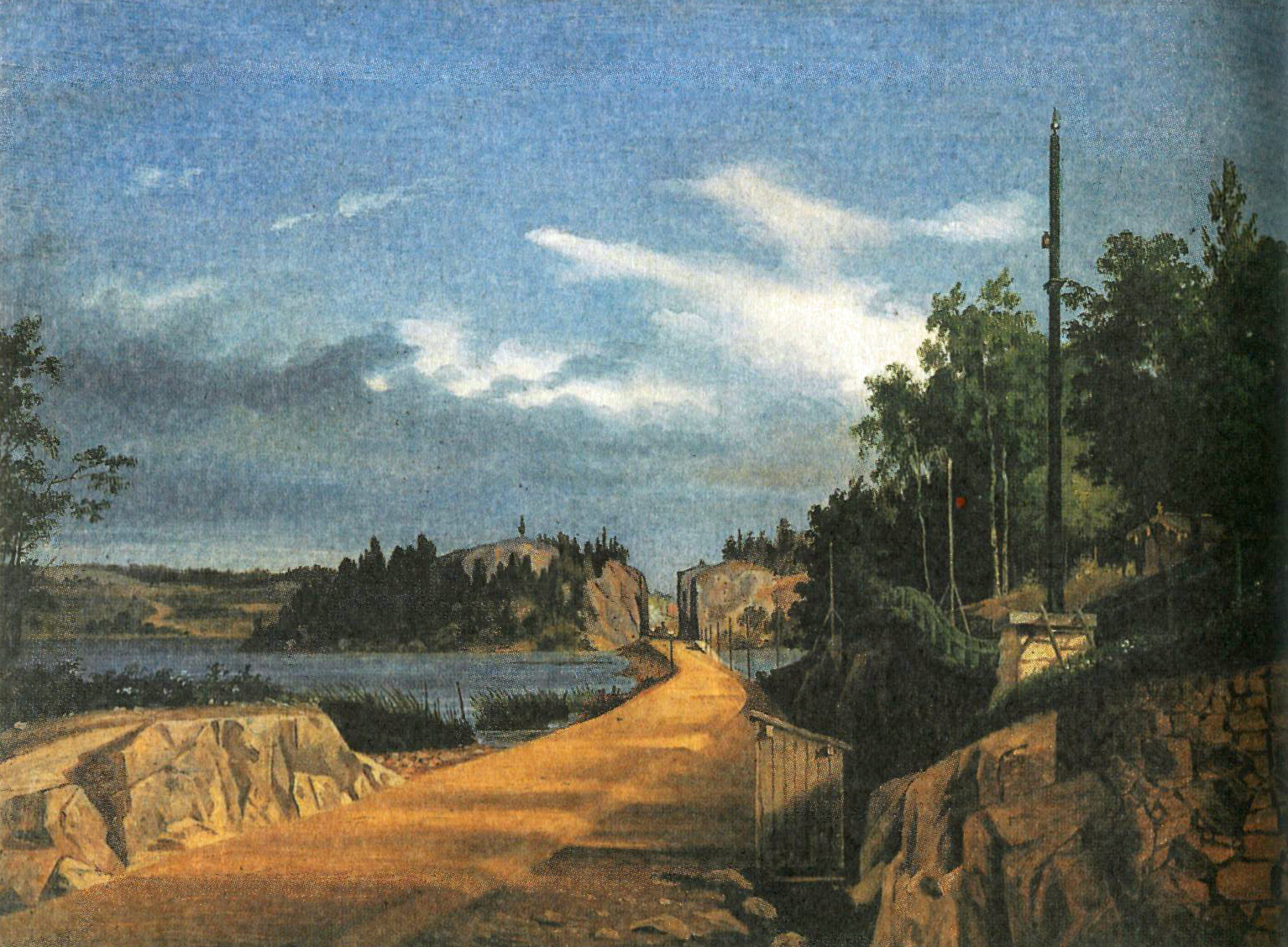
Embankment

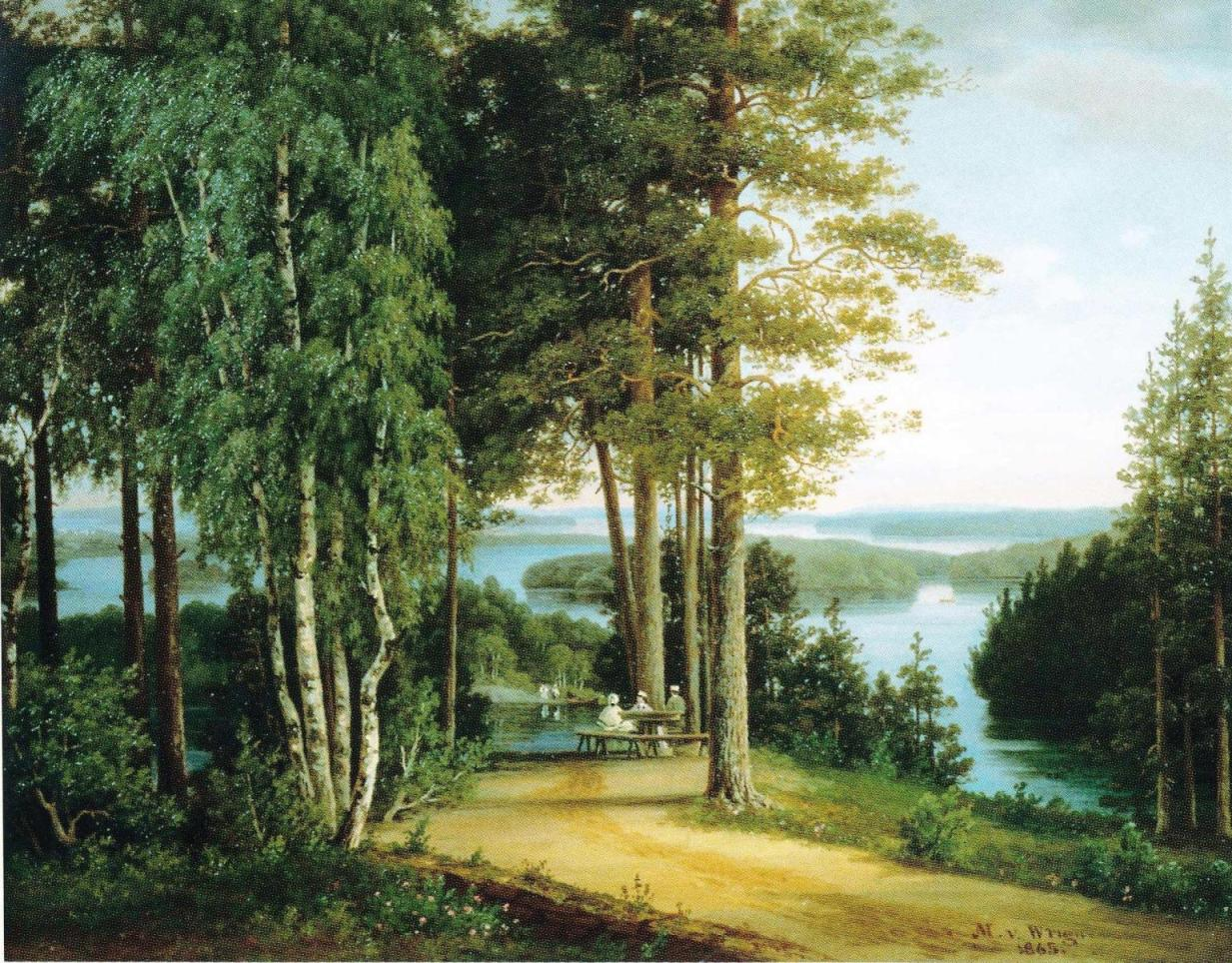
Landscape from Punkaharju

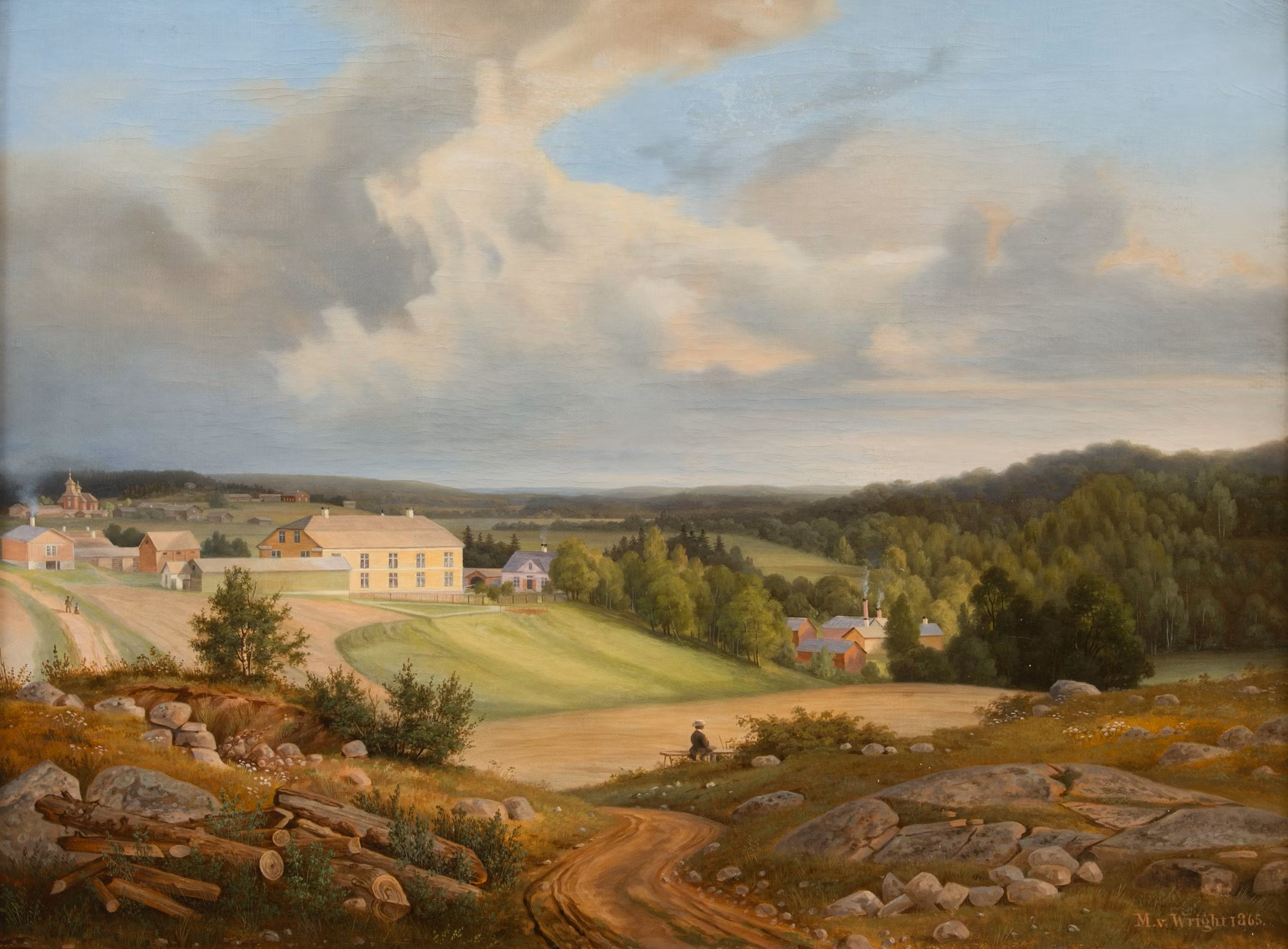
Högfors ironworks
