= Kari Rajamäki =

Finnish politician (born 1948)

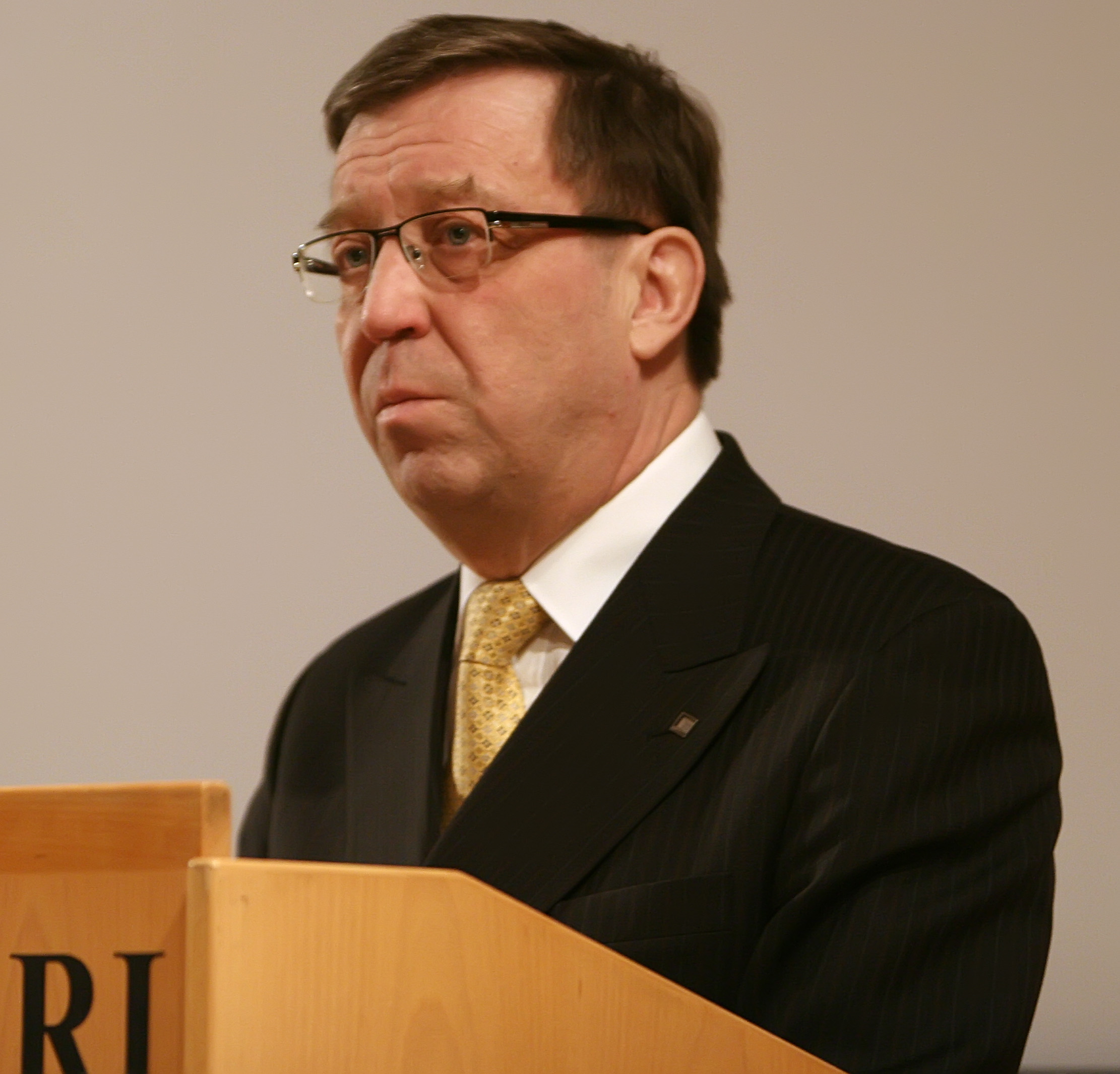
- Rajamäki in 2007

Minister of the Interior
- In office 17 April 2003 – 19 April 2007
- Prime Minister: Anneli Jäätteenmäki; Matti Vanhanen
- Preceded by: Ville Itälä
- Succeeded by: Anne Holmlund

Personal details
- Born: 15 October 1948 (age 77) Anjala, Finland
- Party: Social Democratic Party
- Spouse: Leena Kristiina Rajamäki
- Website: www.karirajamaki.fi/

Kari Juhani Rajamäki (born 15 October 1948, in Anjala) is a Finnish politician from the Social Democratic Party and a former Minister of the Interior.

Rajamäki has been MP since 1983 and represents Southern Savonia. Before he became a minister, he was profiled in public by demanding more funds for road construction projects.

Rajamäki was the Minister of the Interior of Finland in Jäätteenmäki and Vanhanen cabinets from 2003 to 2007. During his term in office he actively contributed to get more funding for police and handling visa grants.

In municipal politics, Rajamäki has been a member of Varkaus town council since 1973.

Political offices
Preceded by Ville Itälä	Minister of the Interior; 2003–2007	Succeeded by Anne Holmlund
