= Nils Abraham af Ursin =

Finnish physician, anatomist, and rector (1785 – 1851)

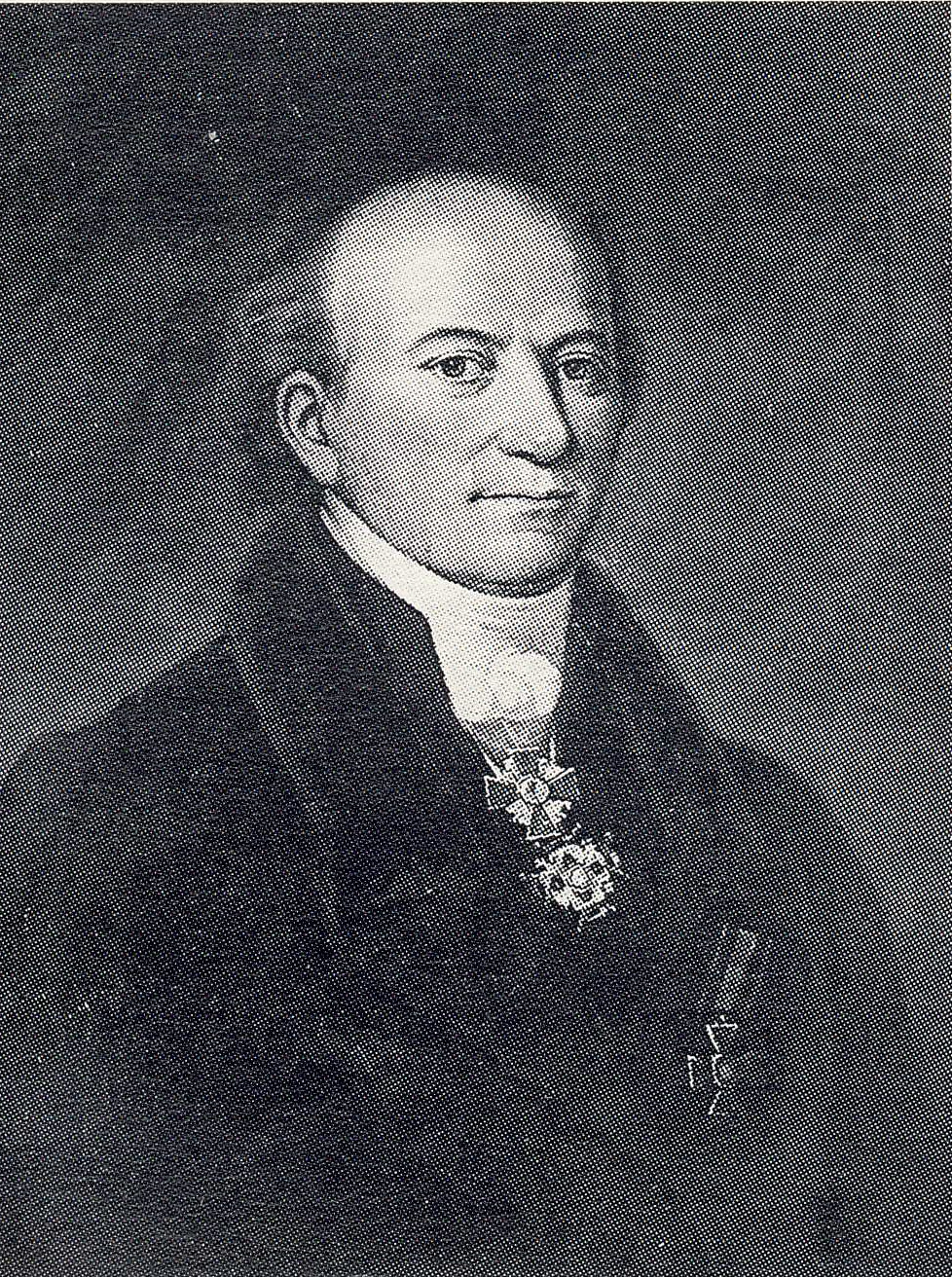

Nils Abraham af Ursin (17 August 1785 – 27 November 1851) was a Finnish medical doctor, anatomist, and university administrator. He served as professor of anatomy and physiology at the Imperial Alexander University in Helsinki from 1825 to 1846 and as rector of the university from 1839 to 1845. He was ennobled in 1845. Ursin contributed to the development of physiology and forensic medicine in Finland and was known both as a strict academic leader and as a popular practicing physician.

Ursin was born in Iitti, Kymmenegård County. His father, Jakob Johan Ursinus, was the parish priest of Iitti, and his mother was Engel Christina Nohrström, daughter of Abraham Nohrström, who had moved from Dalarna in Sweden to Finland. The family originated from the Karhula farm in Jääski (now Lesogorsky, Russia). The members of the family first Swedicized their name to Björn ("bear") and later Latinized it to Ursinus, which was later shortened to Ursin.

He was first taught at home and later attended the Borgå Gymnasium. In 1805 he entered the Royal Academy of Turku (Åbo). He graduated as philosophiae candidatus in 1809 and received his Master of Philosophy degree in 1810. Ursin then pursued medical studies, taking his candidatus medicinae in 1811 and the licentiate degree in 1812, with top marks in surgery, obstetrics, and anatomy and physiology. In 1813 he defended a doctoral dissertation on diseases of the lacrimal passages, based on research by his mentor Joseph Pipping (later ennobled Pippingsköld). He received his medical doctorate in 1817.

Alongside his studies, Ursin was appointed clerk to the newly founded Collegium medicum (later the National Board of Health) in 1812, and he served as Finland’s general vaccinator between 1813 and 1824. He became assistant in surgery and obstetrics at the Academy in 1813, prosektor in anatomy in 1818, and in 1825 he was appointed professor of anatomy and physiology, a chair he held until 1846. As professor he also became a member of the Collegium medicum.

The Academy moved to Helsinki in 1828 after the Great Fire of Turku, and changed its name to Imperial Alexander University. Ursin served as vice rector of the university in 1831–1832 and 1833–1839, and as rector in 1839–1845. Known for his strictness, he sought to keep students orderly, which eventually led to a complete rift between him and the student body by the end of his rectorship.

As a practicing physician, Ursin promoted healthy living, exercise, and swimming. He regularly bathed in the sea near what later became known as Ursin’s Rock in Helsinki, often accompanied by students.
