= Israel Hwasser =

Swedish medical doctor and professor

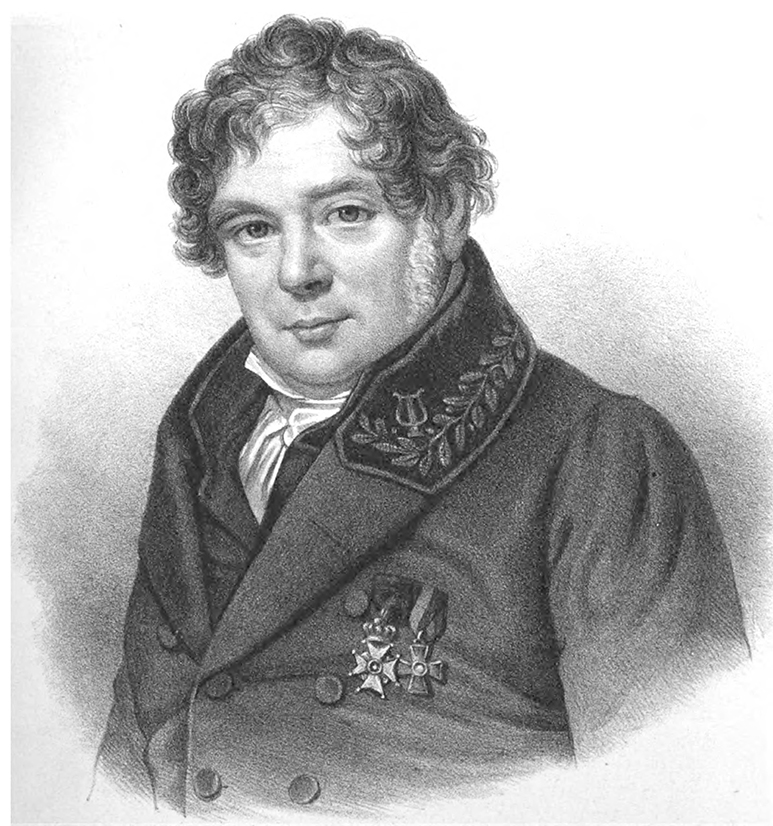
Lithograph of Hwasser (1868)

Israel Hwasser (17 September 1790 in Älvkarleby – 11 May 1860 in Uppsala) was a Swedish medical doctor and professor, who became a member of the Swedish Academy in 1854.

Hwasser was the son of the vicar in Älvkarleby parish, Lars Adolph Hwasser, and Margareta Catharina Djurman. He grew up in the vicarage, receiving his schooling at home. When he was 14 years old he took the finishing exam, studentexamen, in Uppsala, and went on to study medicine there. In 1813 he finished his studies and defended his dissertation to become a Doctor of Medicine. The subject of his dissertation was the treatment of fevers with cold water.

Hwasser joined the Swedish troops as a military doctor in the War of the Sixth Coalition (part of the Napoleonic Wars) in 1813–14. He served in Germany and Norway. After his return to Sweden, he pursued further studies in surgery at the Karolinska Institute in Stockholm. In 1817, at the age of 26, he was appointed Professor of medicine in Turku. While he was there, he gradually changed his view of medicine, beginning to believe that humans caused their own illness, while healing was a divine force.

In 1827, the Great Fire of Turku led to the move of the faculty of medicine, together with the rest of the Royal Academy of Turku, to Helsinki. Hwasser moved, too, but he only remained in Helsinki until 1830, when he applied for a professorship in Uppsala. He returned to Uppsala in order to fight against plans to locate all medical education in Sweden at the Karolinska Institute. He would continue his vocal criticism of Karolinska for 30 years, something that made him somewhat controversial. His opposition to the more scientific Jöns Jacob Berzelius has been likened to the opposition in the earlier century between Emanuel Swedenborg and Carl Linnaeus.

Hwasser was a well-liked teacher of medicine among students and other teachers, and the number of medical students increased during his years as professor. His theories about the philosophical underpinnings of medicine were however less popular. He was also outspoken about his views on public morality and decency, and in his last years he expressed deep admiration for Tsar Nicholas I as the defender of Christendom against liberalism, socialism and godlessness.

Hwasser was a member of the Royal Society of Sciences in Uppsala, the Royal Swedish Academy of Sciences and the Royal Swedish Academy of Letters, History and Antiquities. In 1854, he was made a member of the Swedish Academy. While a member of the latter institution he wrote various texts on literary criticism, mainly focusing on public morality.

He married Anna Charlotta Wadsberg in 1817. She died in 1852.

He resigned his professorship in 1855, at the age of 65, but continued teaching until his death in 1860. He is buried at Uppsala old cemetery.

Cultural offices
Preceded by Samuel Grubbe	Swedish Academy, Seat No 16; 1854–1860	Succeeded by Carl Vilhelm August Strandberg
