= South-Eastern Finland fortification system =

Defensive systemin South-East Finland built by Russia in the 1790s

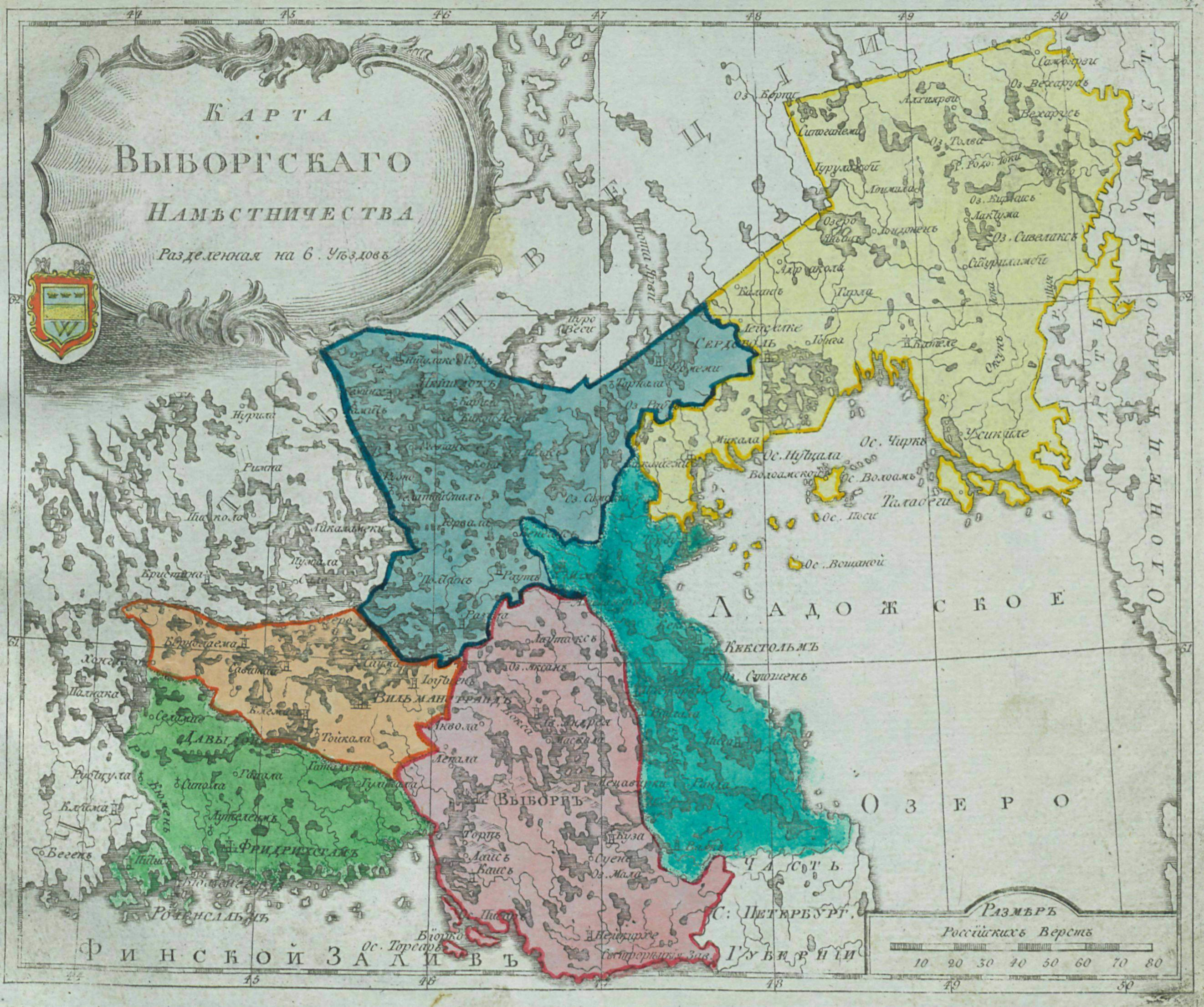
Vyborg Governorate in 1790s

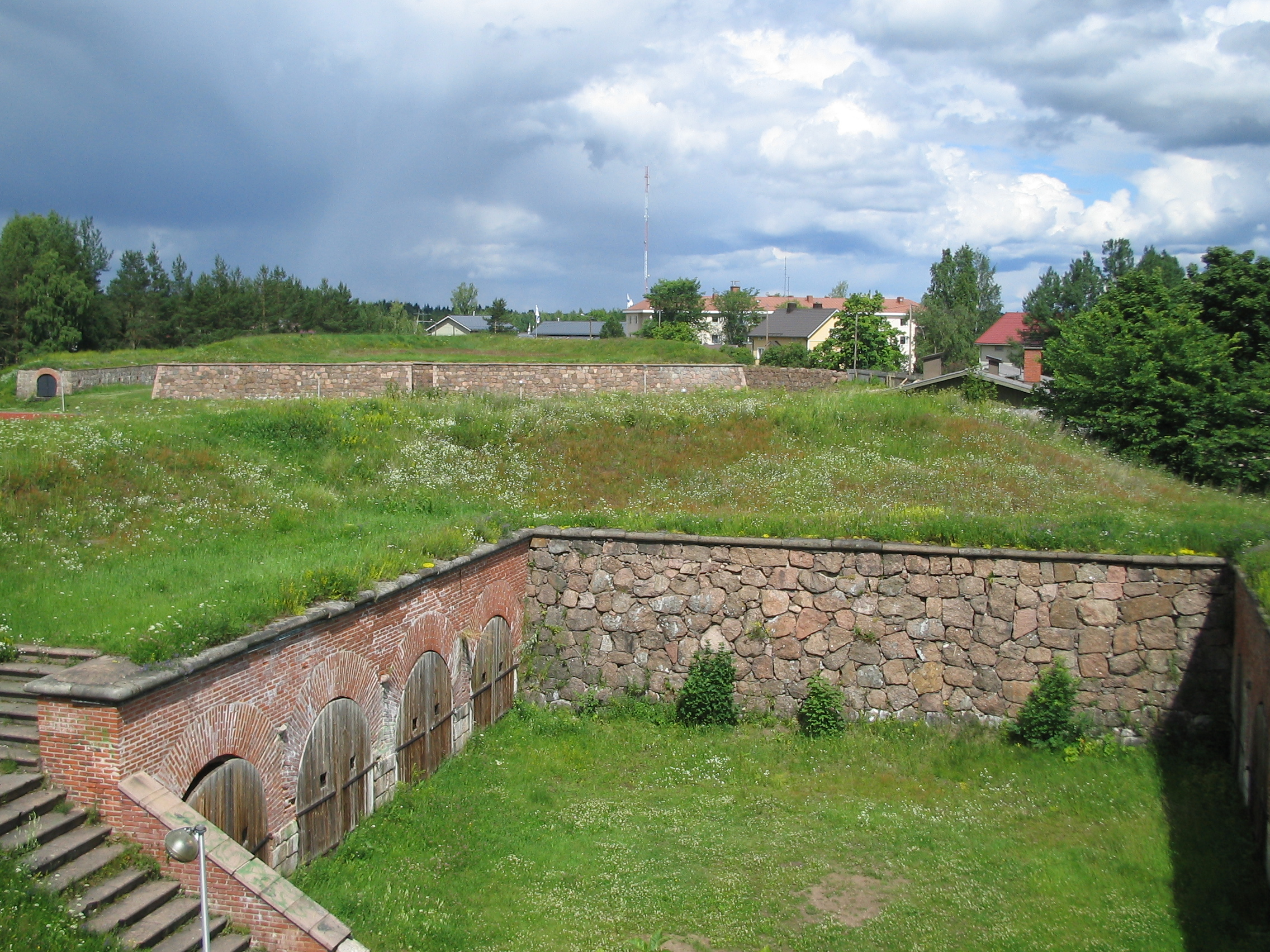
Hamina fortress

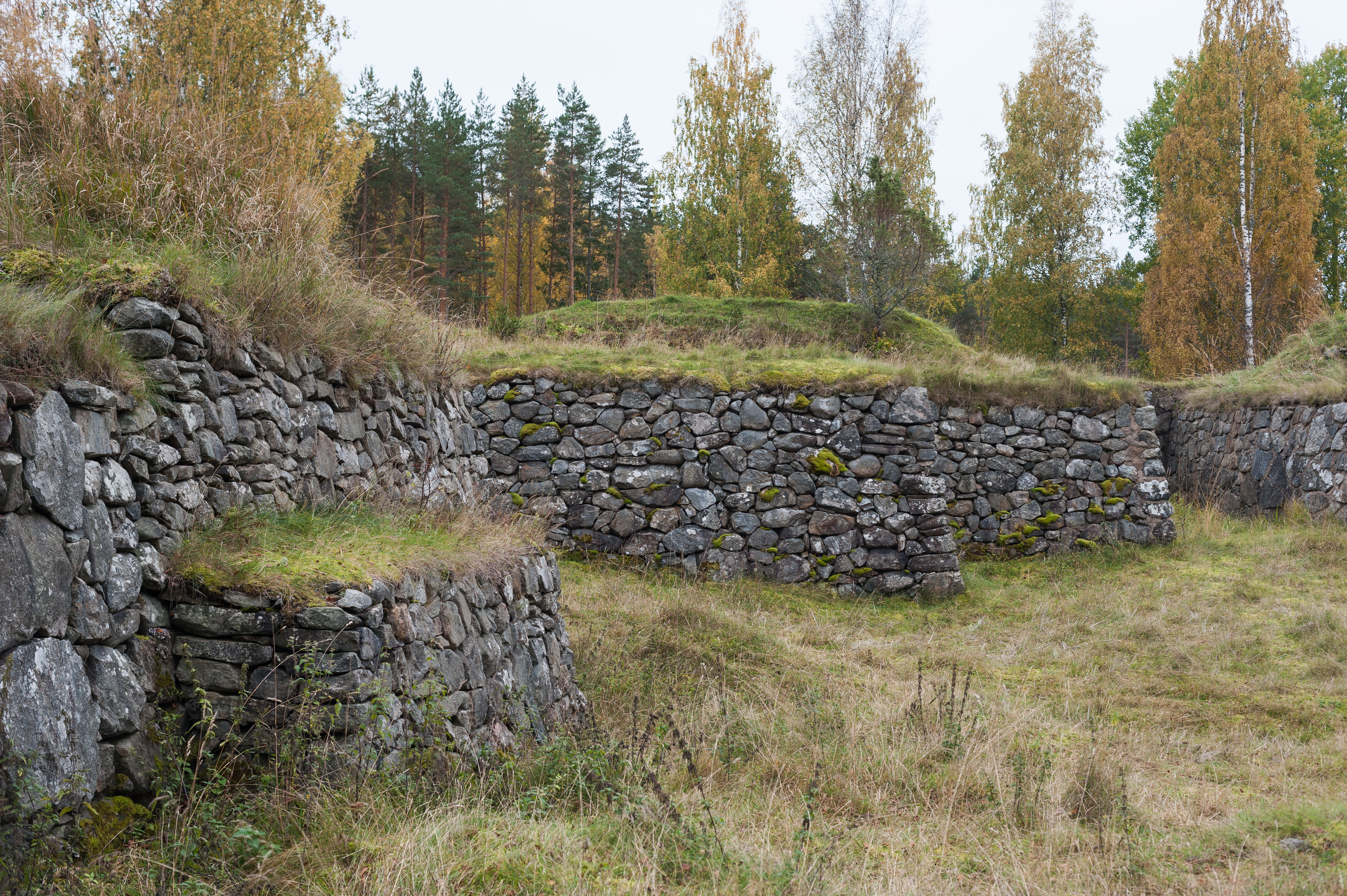
Kärnäkoski fortress

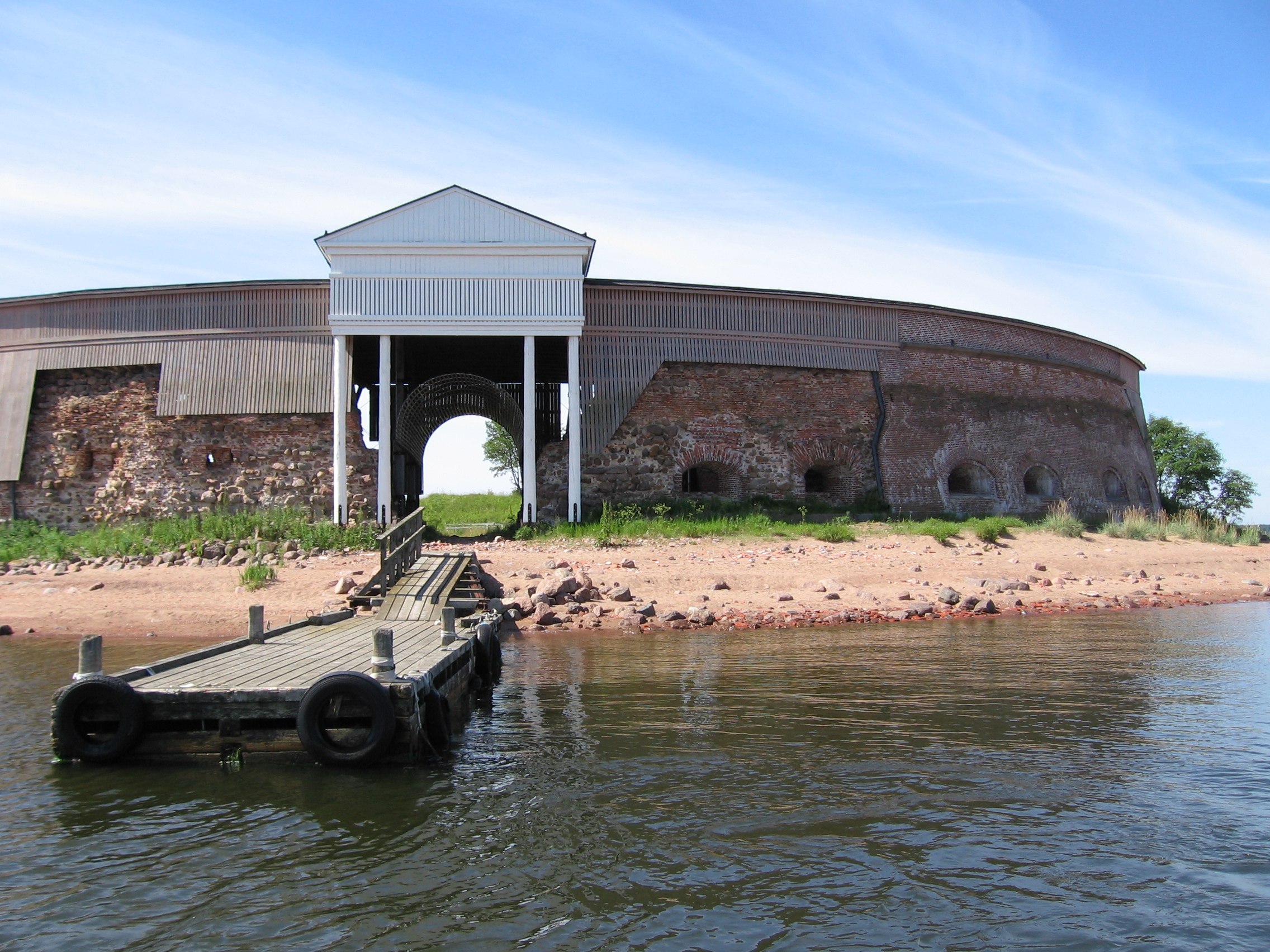
Fort Slava, part of the Ruotsinsalmi sea fortress

South-Eastern Finland fortification system is an extensive defensive system formed by three concentric fortress chains in South-East Finland built by Russia in the 1790s. The purpose of the fortification system was to protect the capital of the Russian Empire, Saint Petersburg, from a possible Swedish attack.

== Russo-Swedish War of 1788–1790 and the defence of Saint Petersburg ==
Before the South-Eastern Finland fortification system was built, the defence of the Russian-controlled South-East Finland or Old Finland in 18th century relied mainly on the fortresses captured from Sweden. Russia had acquired the medieval castles in Vyborg (Viipuri) and Korela (Käkisalmi) in the Treaty of Nystad 1721. In the 1743 Treaty of Åbo Sweden ceded the 17th-century fortress in Lappeenranta and the Hamina fortress built in the 1720s as well as the medieval castle of Olavinlinna in Savonlinna to Russia. The only new fortress built by Russia in Old Finland before the 1790s was the construction of the first phase of the Taavetti Fortress in Luumäki between 1773 and 1781.

The Russo-Swedish War of 1788–1790, started by the King Gustav III of Sweden, ended in the Treaty of Värälä with neither side gaining territory. Nevertheless, the victories the Swedish army achieved in the war had shown that the defences of the North-Western border of Russia were inadequate and the capital of Saint Petersburg – located relatively close to the border – was thus in potential danger. After the war Russia began to strengthen the defences in Old Finland. The empress of Russia, Catherine II, gave the responsibility of strengthening the defences by creating a strong fortification system to General Alexander Suvorov in 1791.

== Three concentric fortress chains ==
General Suvorov rapidly started the construction works. The objective was close all roads leading to Saint Petersburg through Old Finland with fortresses. New fortresses were built at cross roads or in terrain that was difficult to bypass and old fortresses were renovated according to the latest fortification technology. The end result was a strong fortification system of three concentric fortress chains.

The inner fortress chain closest to the capital was formed from Shlisselburg fortress (Pähkinälinna), Kronstadt fortress and the castles of Vyborg and Korela. The second chain was formed from the fortresses of Hamina, Taavetti and Lappeenranta. New border fortresses built in Kymenlaakso formed the outermost chain along with the medieval castle of Olavinlinna. The inland fortresses of Kärnäkoski, Järvitaipale and Utti along with the fort of Liikkala were quite small, but the double fortress of Kyminlinna and Ruotsinsalmi sea fortress on the coast was quite formidable.

Only the fortresses in the outermost chain were new, but existing older fortresses were also enlarged and strengthened. The earth walls of Hamina and Lappeenranta were reinforced with stone walls, Taavetti fortress was enlarged, the cannon towers of Olavinlinna were raised and bastions were added to the medieval castle. The bastions of Vyborg and Korela castles were also reinforced.

In addition to the fortifications, the ability of the Russian Navy to sail in Saimaa Lake was improved by building four new open canals called Suvorov Military Canals on the waterway between Lappeenranta and Savonlinna. The canals were needed, because Sweden could still control the water traffic in Saimaa at the narrows in Puumala. The canals of Kutvele, Käyhkää, Kukonharju and Telataipale located in Taipalsaari, Ruokolahti, Puumala and Sulkava respectively were built alongside the fortresses. Gunboats of the Russian Saimaa Fleet were based at Lappeenranta and Kärnäkoski fortresses and Olavinlinna castle. The fleet consisted of less than a hundred different sized vessels and one thousand men.

== Harsh construction work ==
The manpower for the construction works was provided by the regular army of the Vyborg Governorate (20 000 men) and a temporary Finland division (Finljandskij division) of 20 000–30 000 men. Prisoners were also used for labor. The smaller border fortresses were finished quickly, some already in the early 1790s. Larger construction works, such as canals, took longer.

The conditions in the construction sites were harsh. Severe climate, poor accommodation, insufficient nutrition and sickness took a toll on the men. Up to 10 000 men died or were too ill to work. The gruelling pace of the work maintained by General Suvorov is also said have caused the death of many workers. The local Finnish population did not have to partake on the actual construction work, but had to provide shelter, food and transport for the large army.

== Fortresses of South-East Finland as protection of Russia ==
The enormous amount work done to fortify Old Finland was wasted, as the border between Sweden and Russia moved westward as a result of the Finnish War between 1808 and 1809. The fortification system was not tested in this war, as the Swedish troops retreated from border well before Russians attacked. After the war the inland fortresses were abandoned, and only the coastal fortresses retained their military value. Ruotsinsalmi sea fortress was attacked by British-French fleet during the Crimean War in 1855. The Russian troops abandoned the fortress before the attack and the enemy demolished the empty sea fortress.

== Present-day condition of the fortresses ==
Most of the fortresses are now popular tourist attractions. Fortresses inside the borders of modern Finland are maintained by the Finnish National Board of Antiquities, which has been restoring them especially during the 1990s. The last part of the fortification system, the military canals of Suvorov, are currently under restoration work.

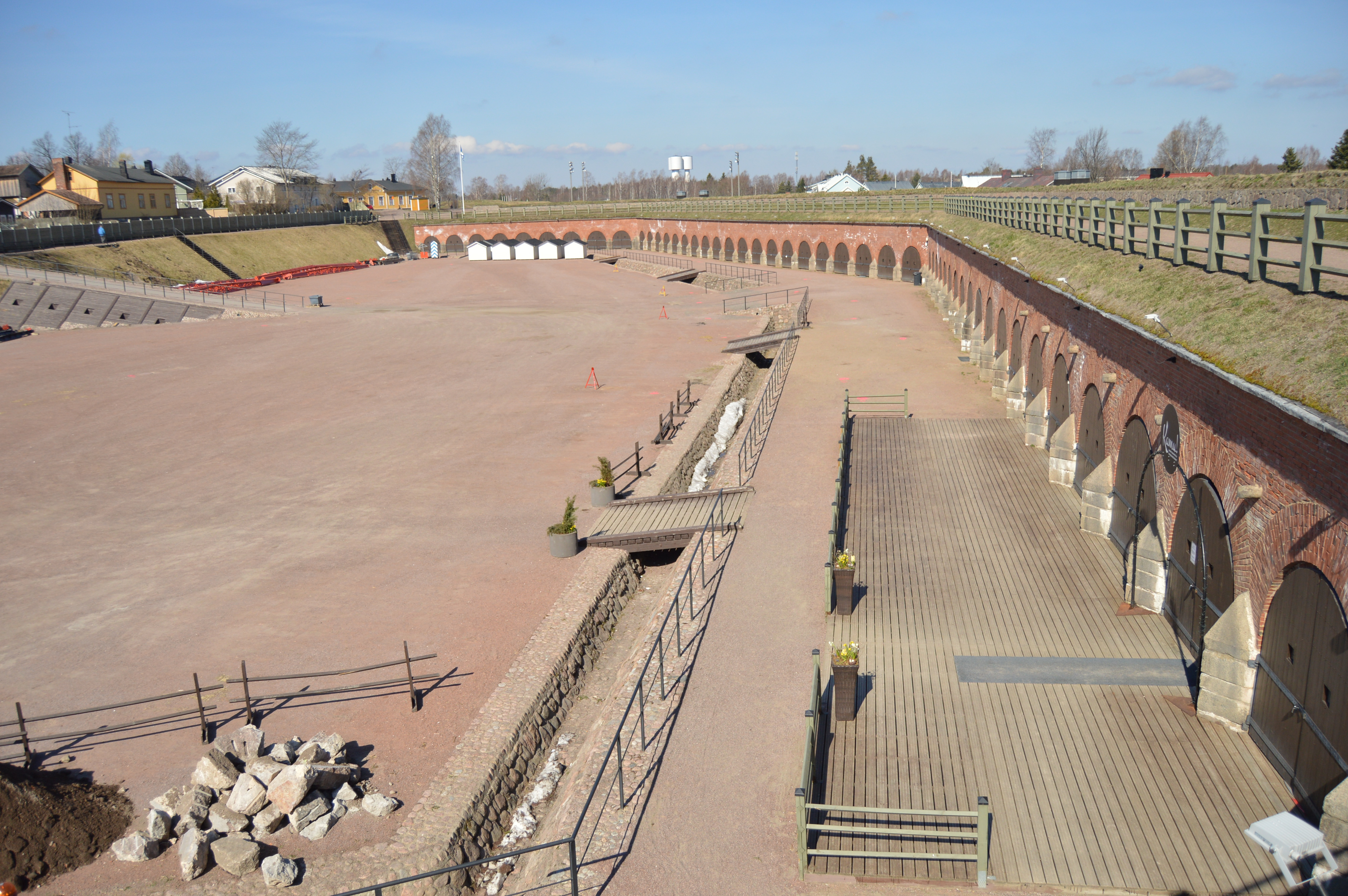
Hamina Fortress

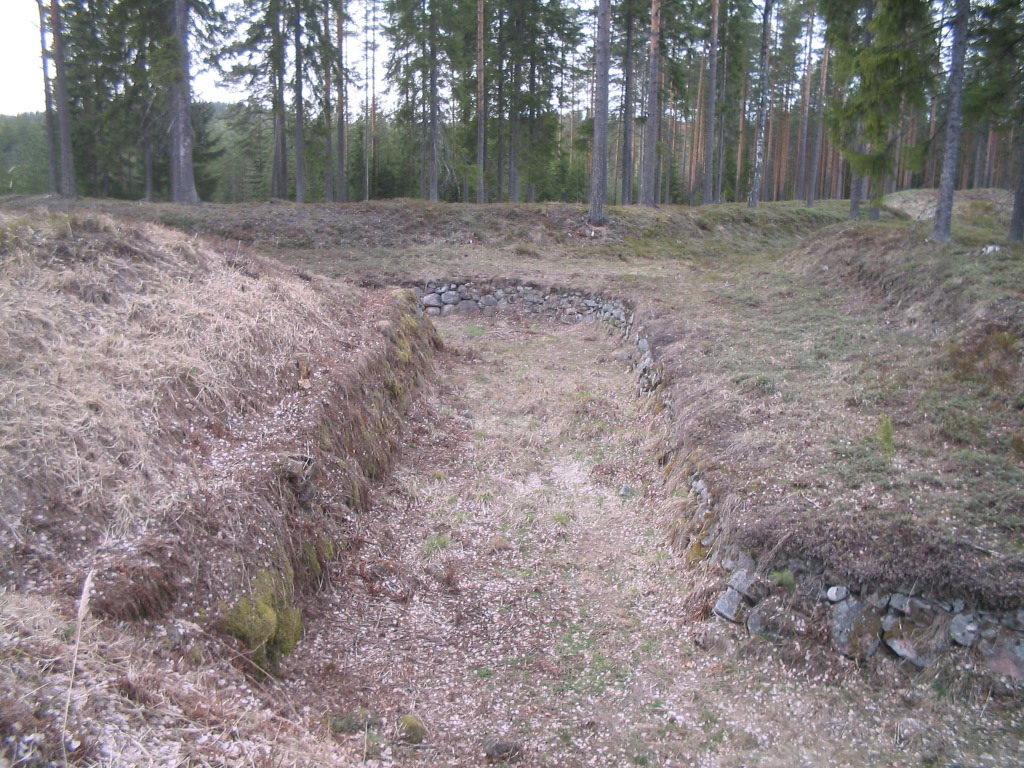
Järvitaipale Fortress

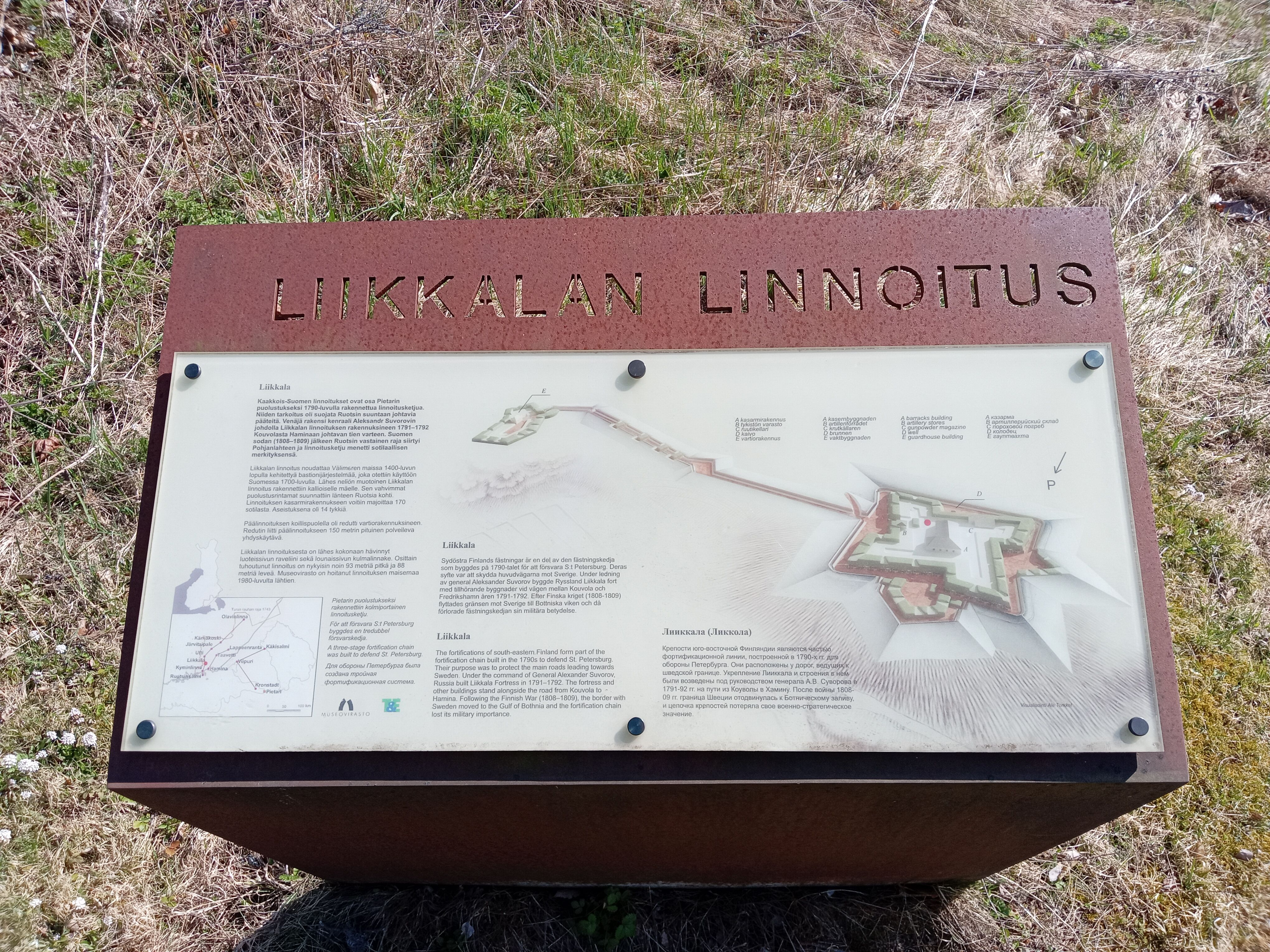
Liikkala Fortress

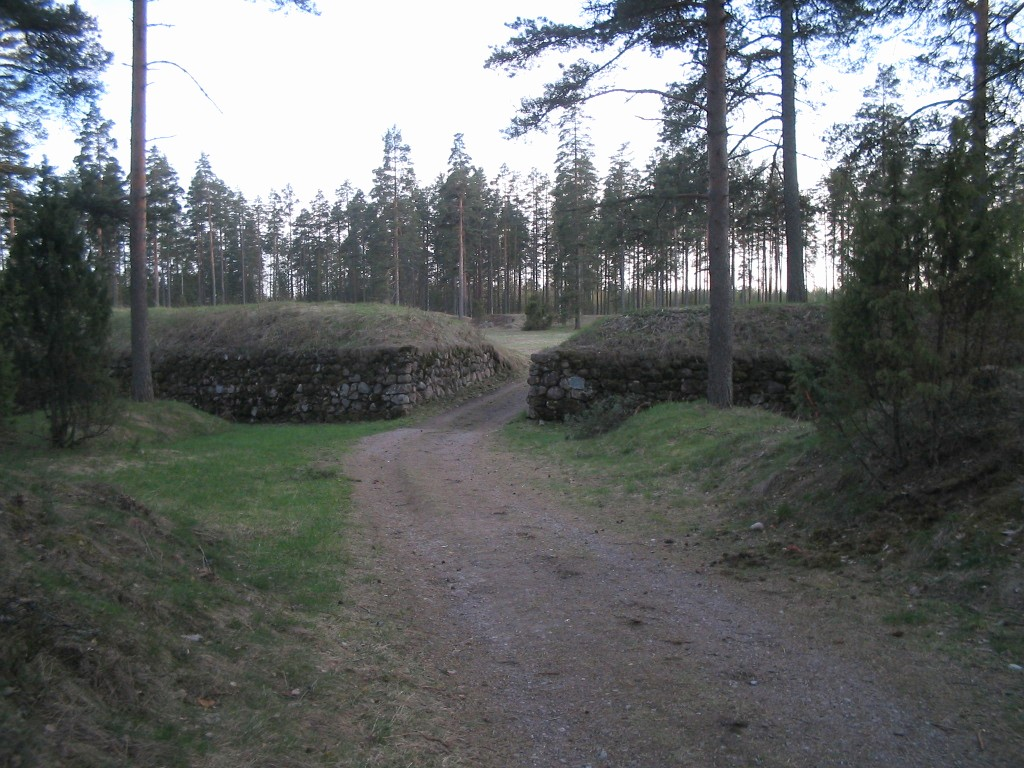
Utti Fortress

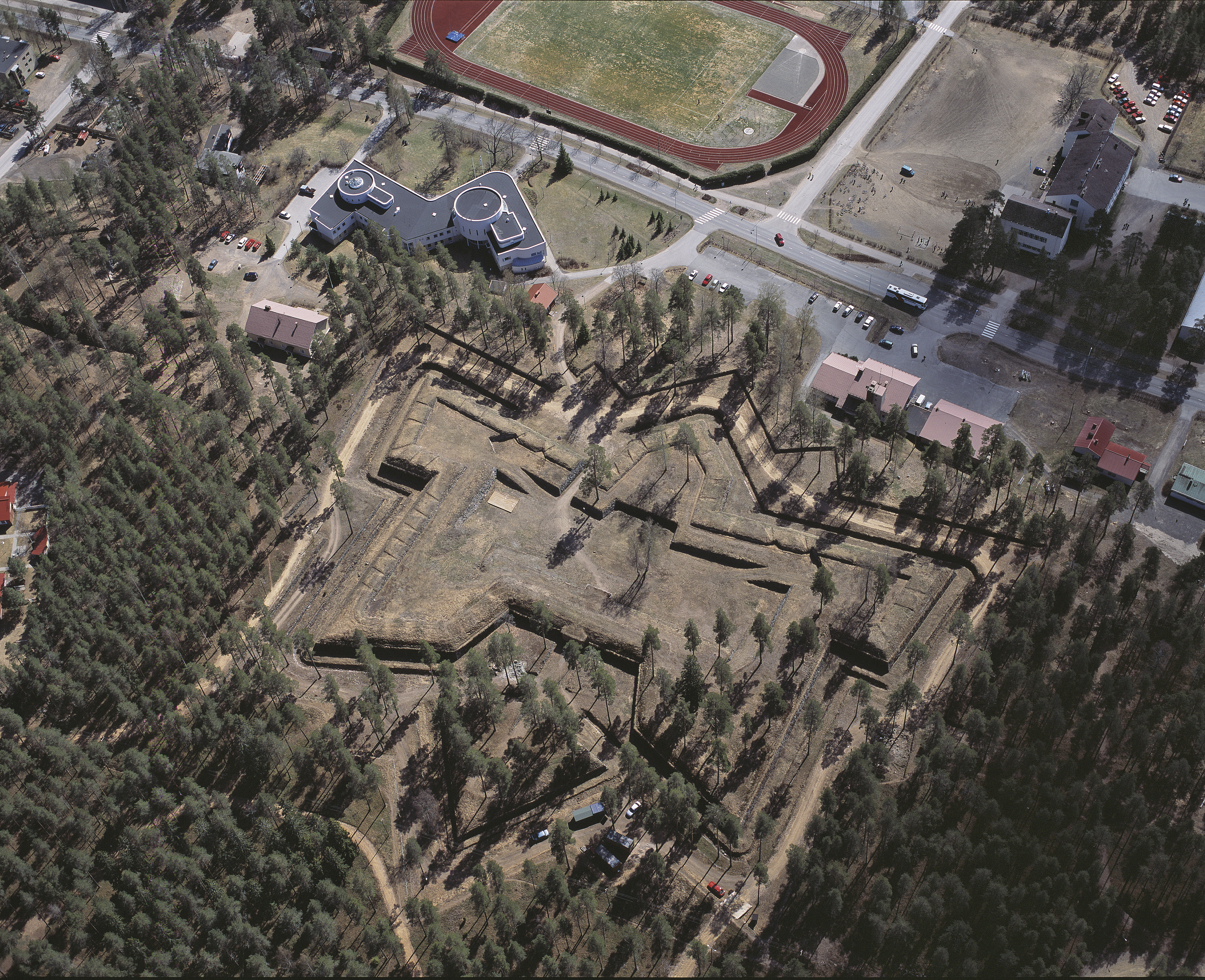
Taavetti Fortress

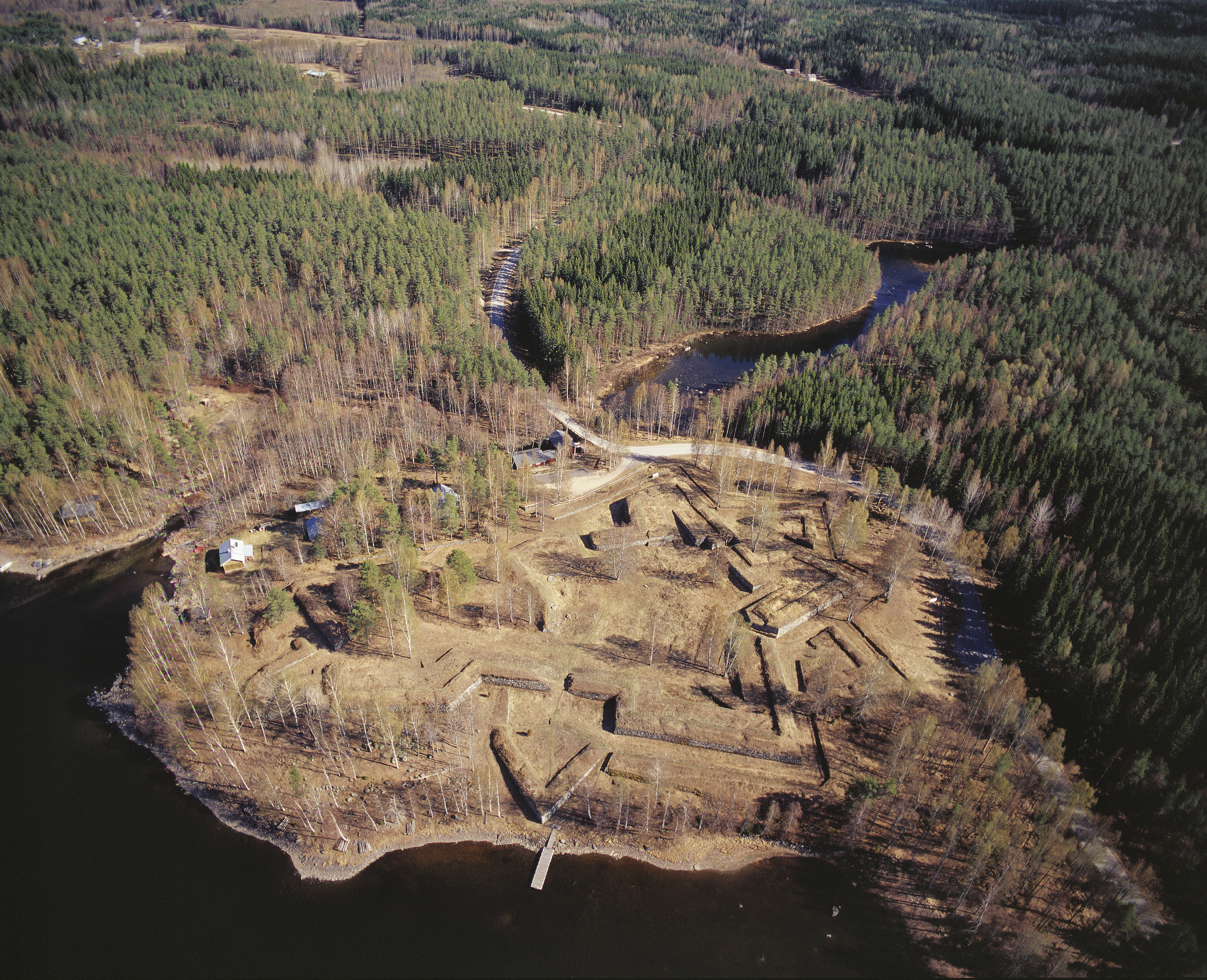
Kärnäkoski Fortress

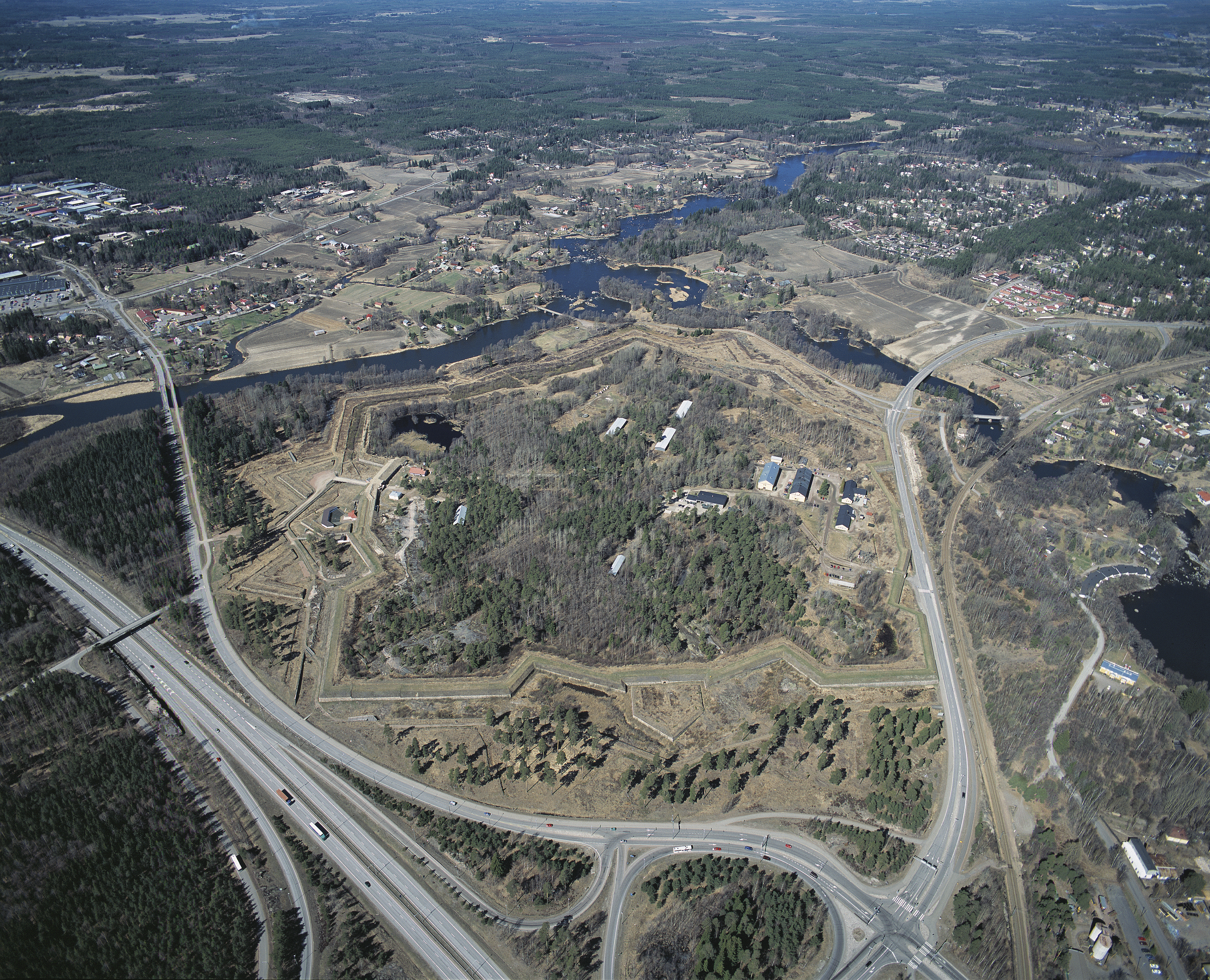
Kyminlinna

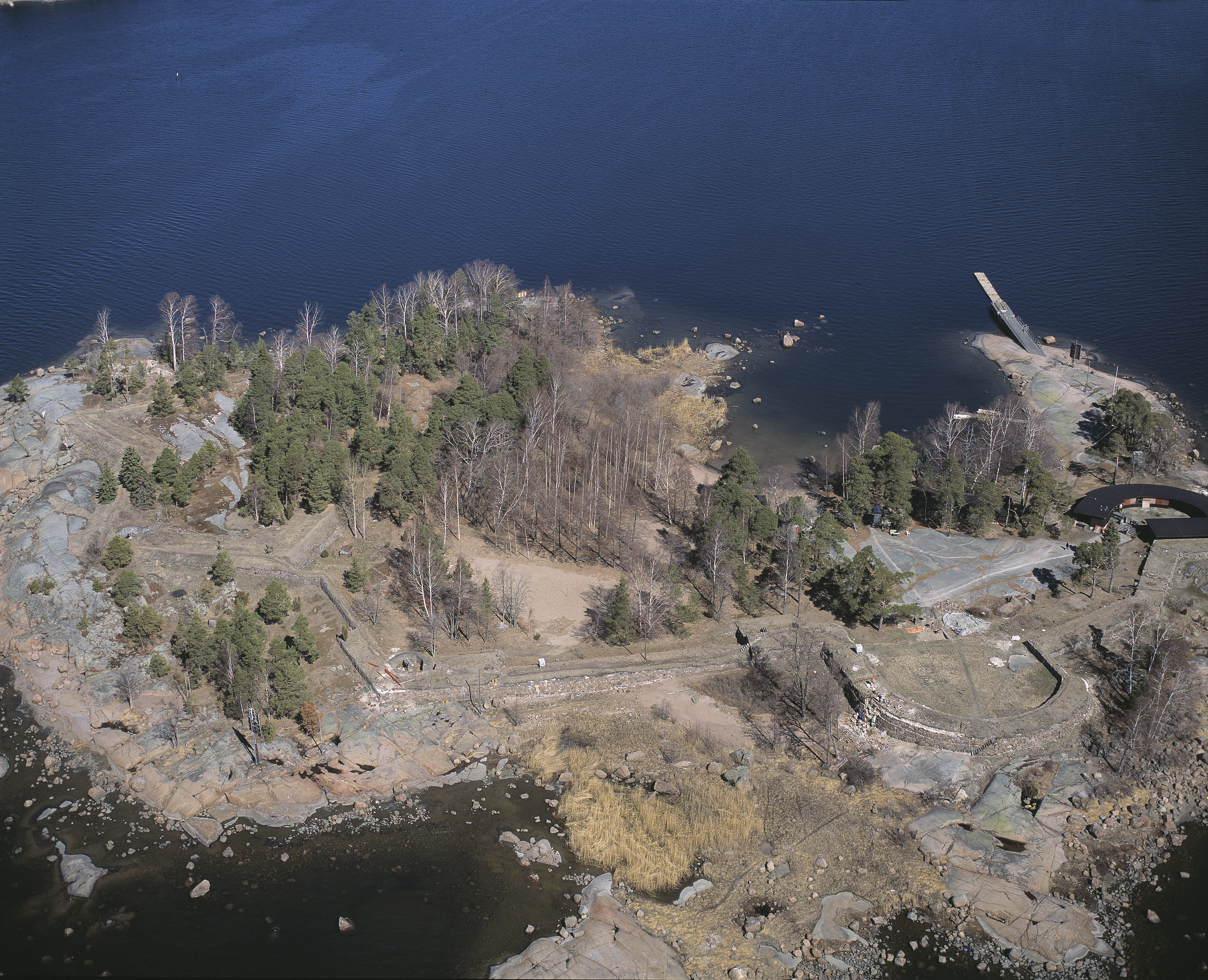
Ruotsinsalmi sea fortress

== Sources ==
- An information package of Aleksandr Suvorov and the fortresses in South-East Finland by the Museum of South Karelia (PDF) (retrieved 17.7.2009)
