= Lovisa Fortress =

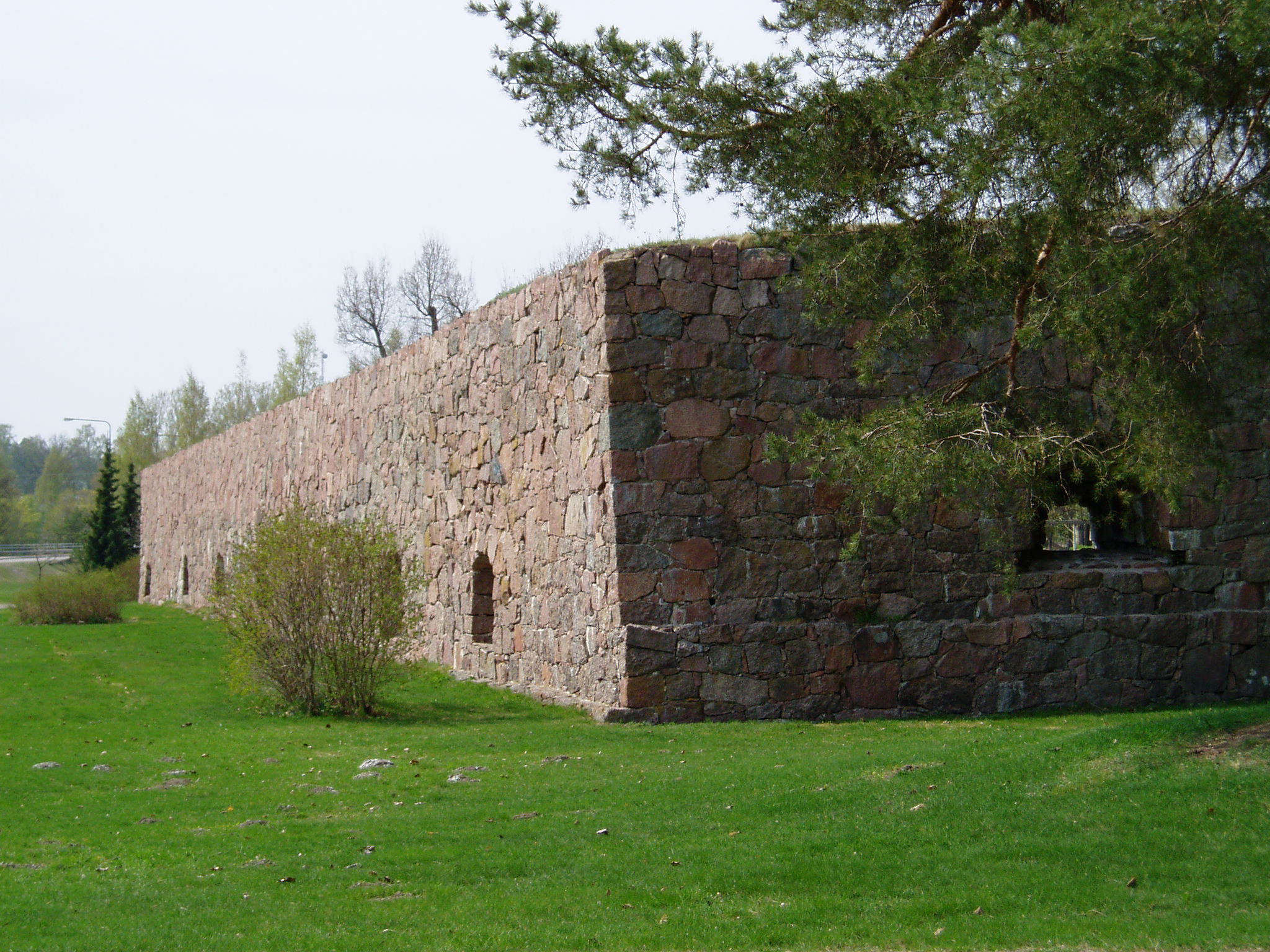
- Interactive map of Lovisa Fortress
- Location: Loviisa, Finland
- Coordinates: 60°27′44″N 26°14′17″E
- Type: Fortress
- Length: 60.462222
- Width: 26.238056
- Beginning date: 1748

Loviisa Castle (Finnish: Loviisan maalinnoitus) is an earthen Fortress located in Loviisa, Finland.

== The War of the Hats and the Peace of Turku ==
Wanting revenge for their defeat in the Great Northern War, Sweden launched the War of the Hats in 1741–1743. But his troops were badly equipped, badly trained and badly commanded, and they had to retreat through all of Finland. The entire eastern part will remain under Russian occupation, known as the little anger. By the Treaty of Turku of 1743, the new Swedish-Russian border passes from the western branch of the Kymijoki to the Saimaa. Sweden loses the towns of Hamina, Lappeenranta and Savonlinna as well as Hamina Fortress, Lappeenranta Fortress and Olavinlinna, leaving the new border unprotected.

For the resumption of commercial activities, the town of Degerby was founded in 1745, which was renamed Loviisa in 1752 in honor of Loviisa Ulriika. Loviisa is a market town which it is hoped will provide trade for the eastern part of Finland.

== Strengthening new frontiers ==
The fortification plan presented by Augustin Ehrensvärd to the Swedish Diet of 1746–1747 provides for four fortifications: Loviisa Fortress, Svartholm Fortress, a main fortress in Helsinki and Sveaborg. The Diet approves this defense plan for Finland and King Frederick I validates it definitively. Augustin Ehrensvärd is appointed lead architect and construction manager. Its construction began in 1748.
