= Suvorov military canals =

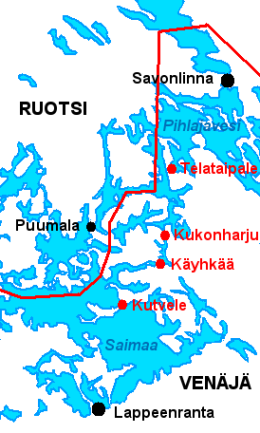
Suvorov military canals and the Swedish-Russian border of 1743 on lake Saimaa

Suvorov military canals (Suvorov canals) is a series of four open canals on Saimaa lake in Finland. The four canals of Kutvele, Käyhkää, Kukonharju and Telataipale are located in Puumala, Ruokolahti and Sulkava. They were built between 1791 and 1798 as part of the South-Eastern Finland fortification system and are the oldest canals in Finland. The canals are named after general Alexander Suvorov who ordered their construction.

== Background ==
After the Russo-Swedish War (1741–1743) Sweden ceded the Lappeenranta Fortress and Olavinlinna castle in Savonlinna to the Russian Empire in the Treaty of Åbo. The treaty divided Saimaa lake in two, with Sweden controlling the strait of Puumala and requiring toll payments from water traffic between Savonlinna and Lappeenranta and denying military traffic altogether. After the Russo-Swedish War (1788–1790) Russia began to improve the defences in Finland by building the South-Eastern Finland fortification system. The war had also showed the importance of Saimaa water ways and as part of the fortification system it was decided to construct a series of canals to bypass Puumala.

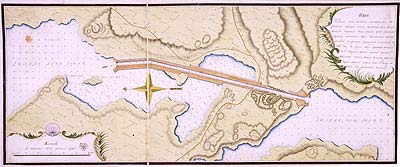
Drawing of Kukonharju canal from 1800.

== Construction ==
Construction of Kutvele, Käyhkää and Telataipale canals began in fall 1791 under Ivan Laube. Construction of Kukonharju canal began later in 1794. The smaller canals had some 300 men working in their construction while the larger Kukonharju canal had around one thousand men. Kukonharju and Kutvele canals were finished in 1796 and Käyhkää and Telataipale in 1798.

The canals are built from stone supported by logs. The canal entrances had prepared blockades from logs and chains as a preparation for a possible enemy attack. Canal entrances also had stone obstacles to prevent anyone who was not familiar with them from navigating safely through them. Canals were from one hundred meters to almost a kilometer in length with each canal being 10 metres (33 ft) wide and 1.3 metres (4 ft 3 in) deep. All canals were open canals with no locks and were simply built across isthmuses. They also had a military guard post, with Kukonharju canal also having a larger garrison.

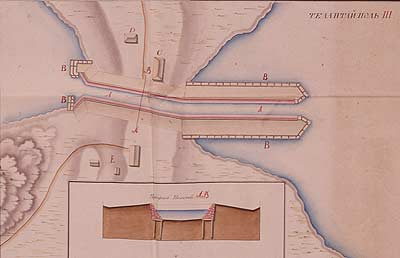
Drawing of Telataipale canal from 1790s

== Military use ==
Suvorov military canals were used by the Russian Saimaa flotilla that had its bases in Lappeenranta and Savonlinna and in the smaller Kärnäkoski Fortress. The flotilla, along with the military canals and the entire South-Eastern Finland fortification system, lost their importance only a decade later as the result of the Finnish War between 1808 and 1809 when Sweden ceded the entire Finland to Russia. The Russian Saimaa flotilla was disbanded in 1810 and in 1816 the responsibility for the canals was transferred to civilian authorities and the use of the canals dwindled to local inhabitants.

== Present day condition ==
Kutvele canal was enlarged twice during 20th century and nothing of the original construction remains. In contrast the other three canals spent 200 years almost untouched from early 19th century until 2003, when Finnish National Board of Antiquities began restoration works on them. Now they have been turned into tourist attractions.

== The canals ==
=== Kutvele ===
61.3268°N 28.3467°E Kutvele canal is located on the border of Taipalsaari and Ruokolahti. When originally built it was 100 metres (330 ft) in length. The canal has been enlarged for shipping and nothing of the original construction remains. A shipping route of 2.4 metres (7 ft 10 in) deep with a maximum height of 12.5 metres (41 ft) passes through the canal.

=== Käyhkää ===
61.4242°N 28.5195°E Käyhkää canal is located in Ruokolahti and is 350 metres (1,150 ft) in total length with the canal entrances, but length of the actual canal is only 80 metres (260 ft). A bridge was built over the canal already during the time of Suvorov. The modern bridge is not original but is located on the same spot. An original toll post building is preserved until today and is now used as resort. Archeological excavation located remnants of a boat carrying stones from 1790s.

=== Kukonharju ===
61.4949°N 28.5255°E Kukonharju is the longest of the canals with a length of 800 metres (2,600 ft). It is located on the border of Ruokolahti and Puumala and was built partly through a rock crest. Kukonharju had the largest garrison of the canals and was used as a border strongpoint.

=== Telataipale ===
61.6544°N 28.6029°E Telataipale is located in Sulkava and is the northernmost of the canals. Telataipale canal is 300 metres (980 ft) in length and it was built through the Salpausselkä ridge.

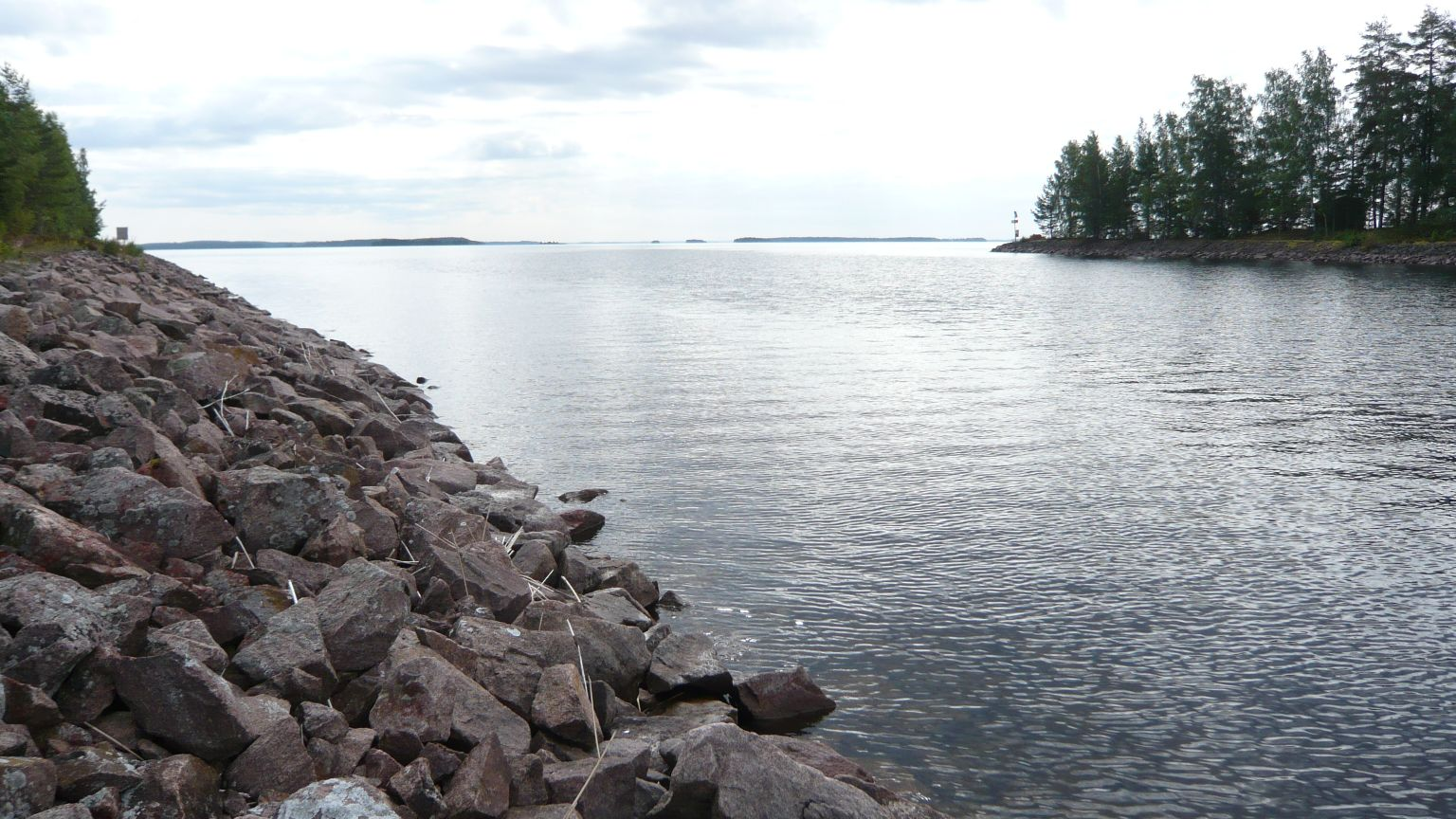
Kutvele canal

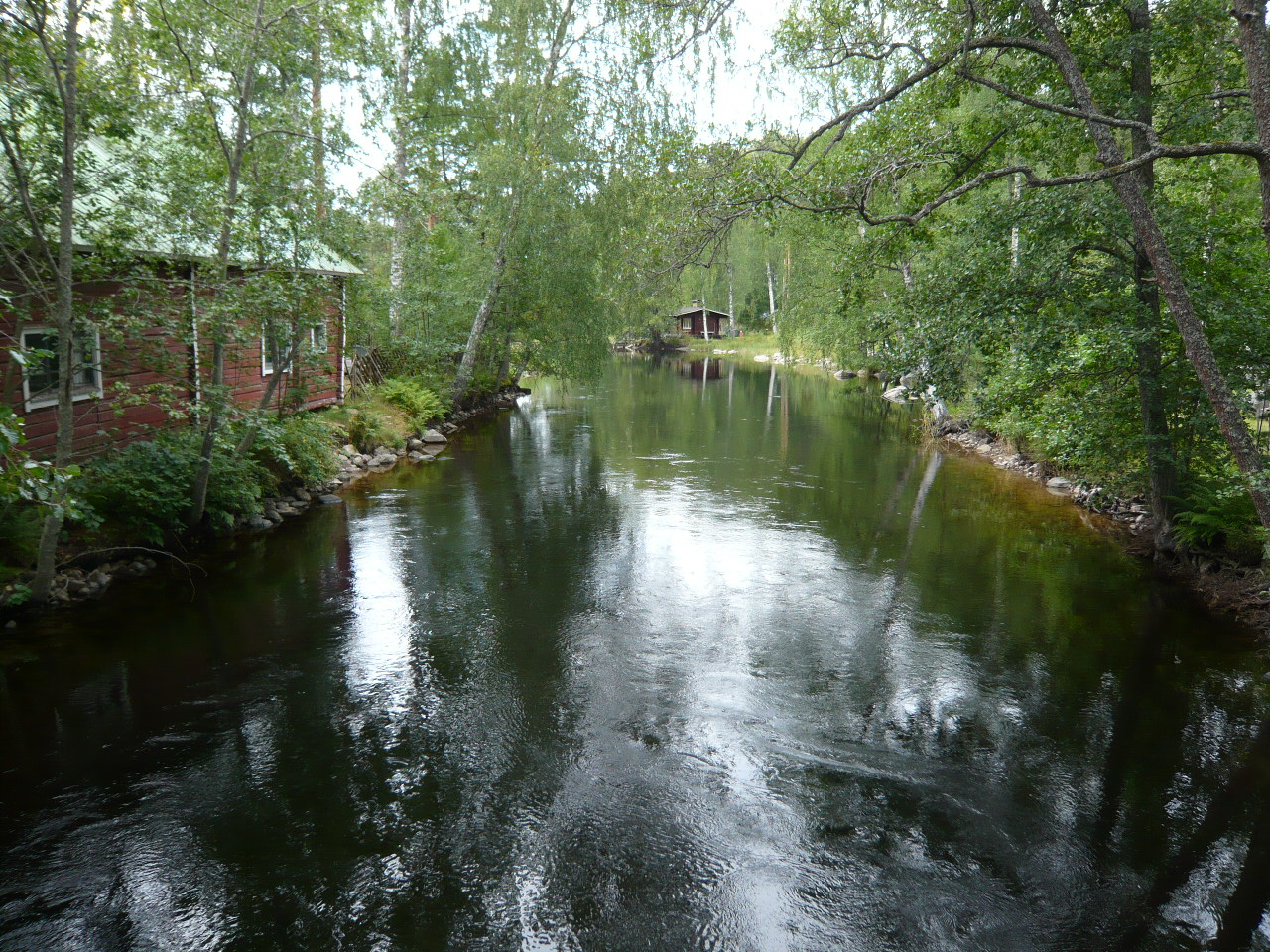
Käyhkää canal

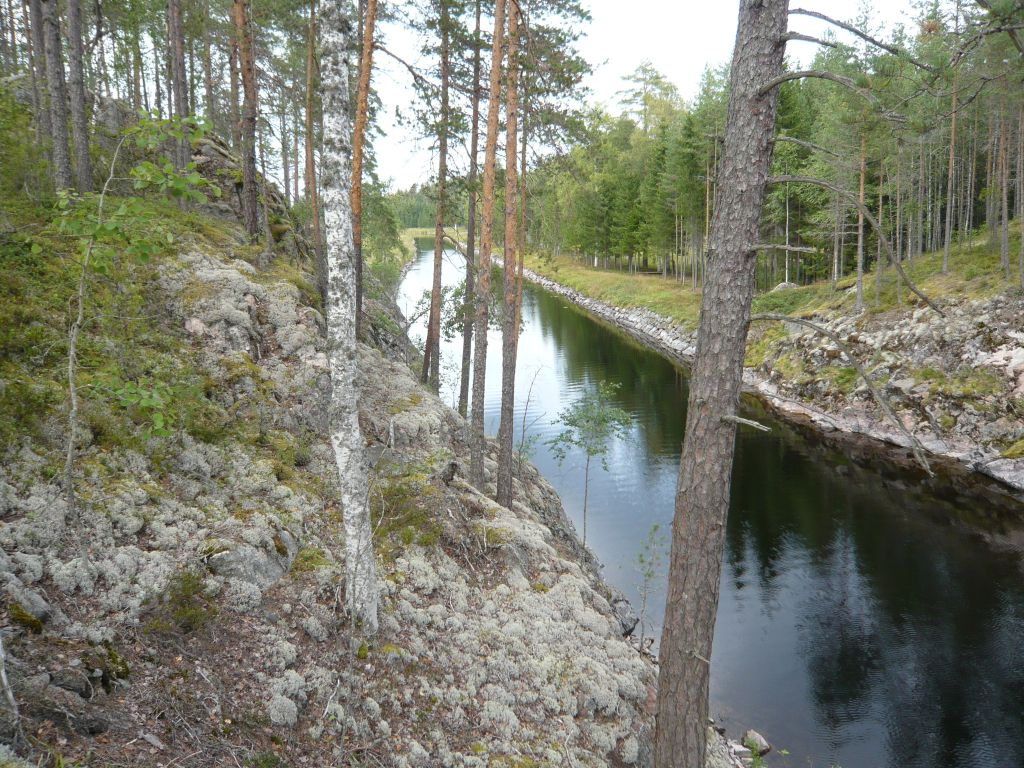
Kukonharju canal

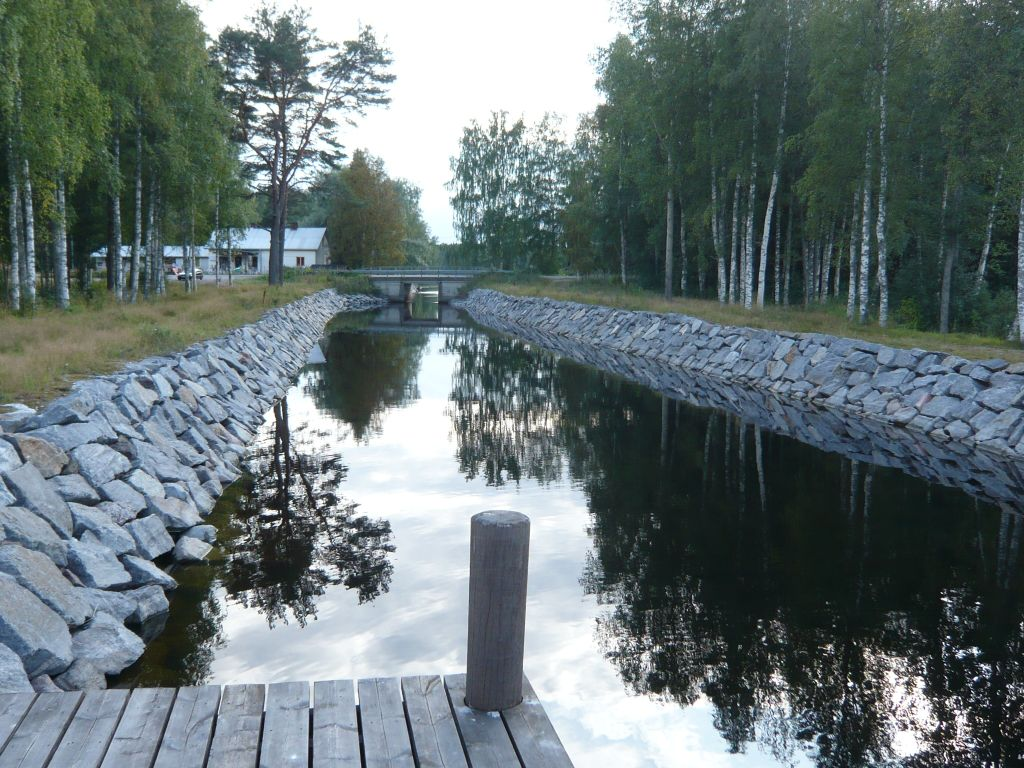
Telataipale canal
