= Järvitaipale Fortress =

Fortress in Finland

- Part of South-Eastern Finland fortification system
- Finland
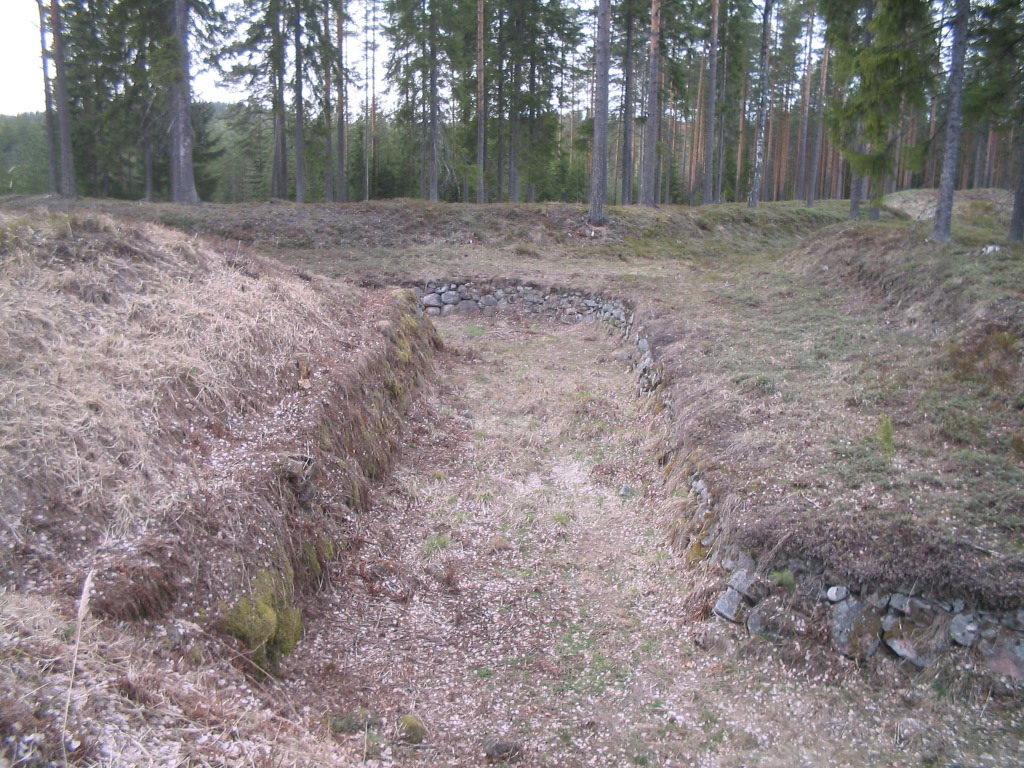
- Järvitaipale Fortress in its current condition

Site information
- Type: Caponier fortress
- Owner: Senate Properties
- Open to the public: yes

Location
- Järvitaipale Fortress
- Coordinates: 61°05′38″N 27°14′20″E
- Area: 74 hectares (180 acres)

Järvitaipale Fortress is part of the fortifications of southeastern Finland, designed and built by General Alexander Suvorov, located in Savitaipale, about 40 km from Kärnäkoski Fortress.

== Background ==
Documents show that this fortification consisted of two groups (Company: military unit) or about 200 soldiers. The fort was armed with six cannons, which were later increased to ten cannons. The task of this fort was to delay the possible attack of the Swedes until they reached the interior of the country. The fortress remained active until the end of the Finnish War, after which it lost its strategic value. On the northern side of the fortress there is a redoubt consisting of two sides of eleven meters and one side of eight meters. The ramparts of the fort have several fire grooves and also a moat surrounds the fortress.

== Current situation ==
The Finnish Heritage Agency listed the fortress in 1966, but a research project was carried out between 5 and 9 May 2008 to further investigate the building. The Järvitaipale Fortress has never been repaired, and apart from small test pits, no archaelogical excavations have been carried out. The fortress has attracted the attention of the Finnish Heritage Agency as a research site, as it is the only 18th-century border fortress that, along with Liikkala Fortress, has remained intact to this day.

The fortress is open for the public, but visitors are not allowed to excavate or modify the place in any way.

== Gallery ==
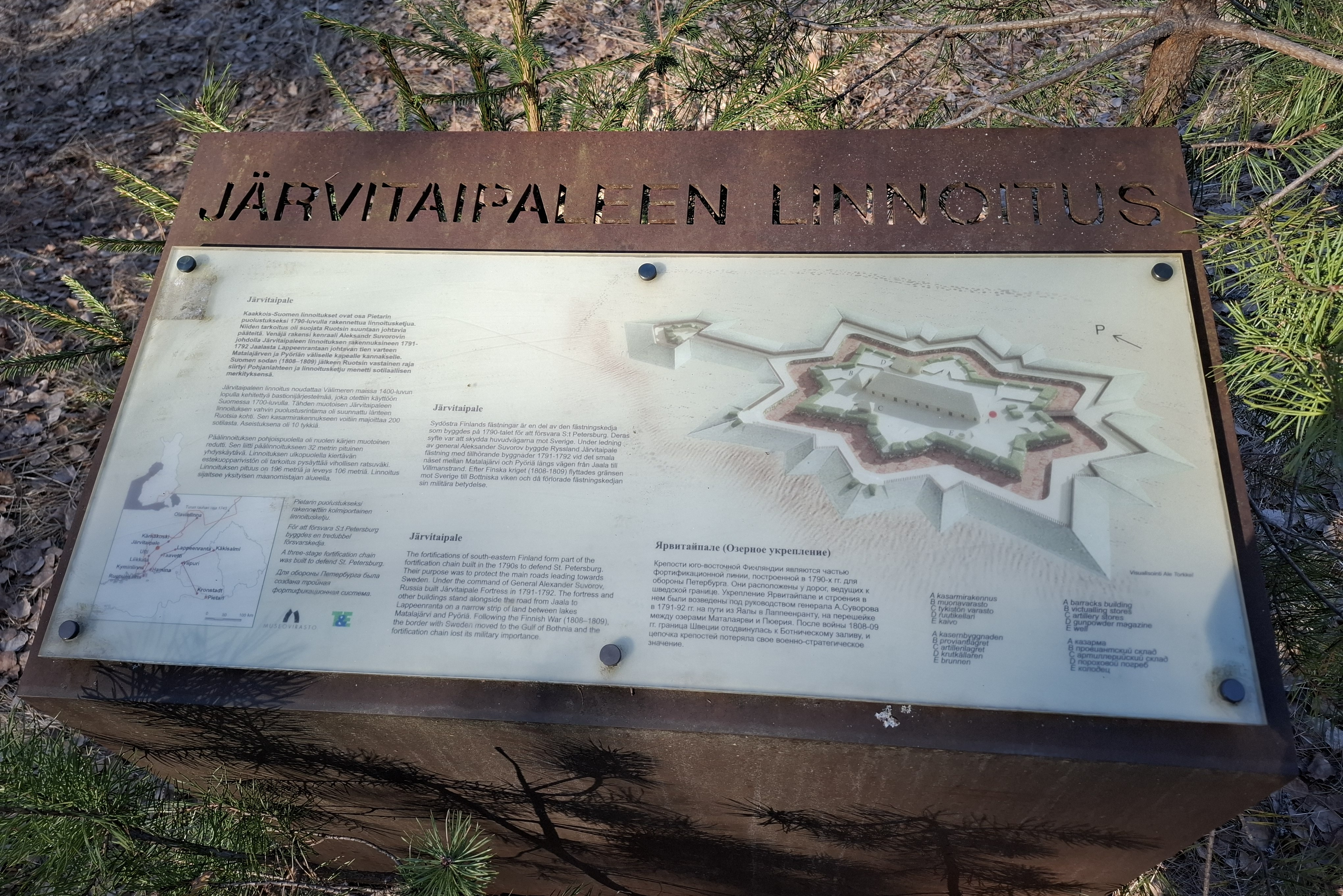
An information board in the fortress

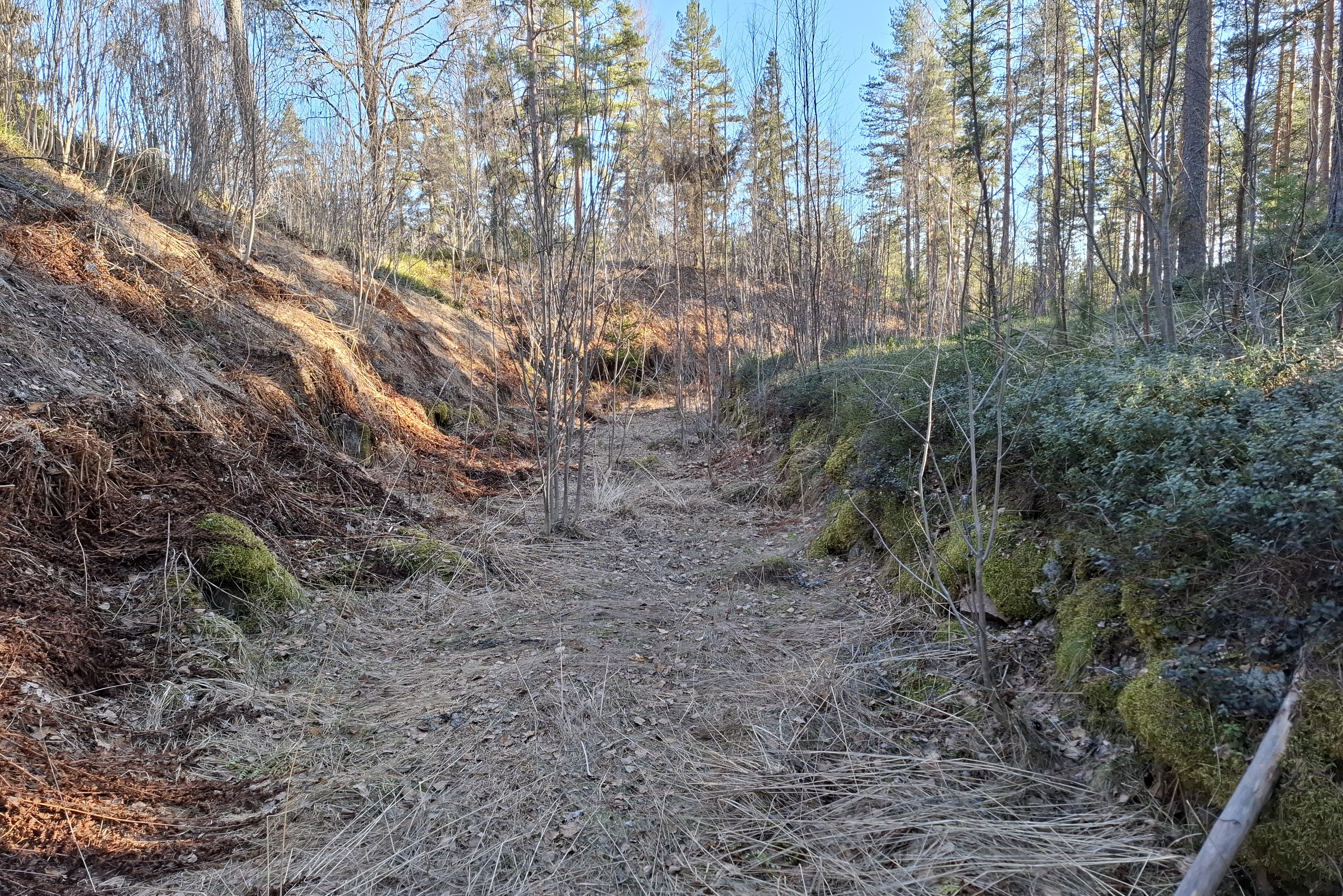
Moat and walls

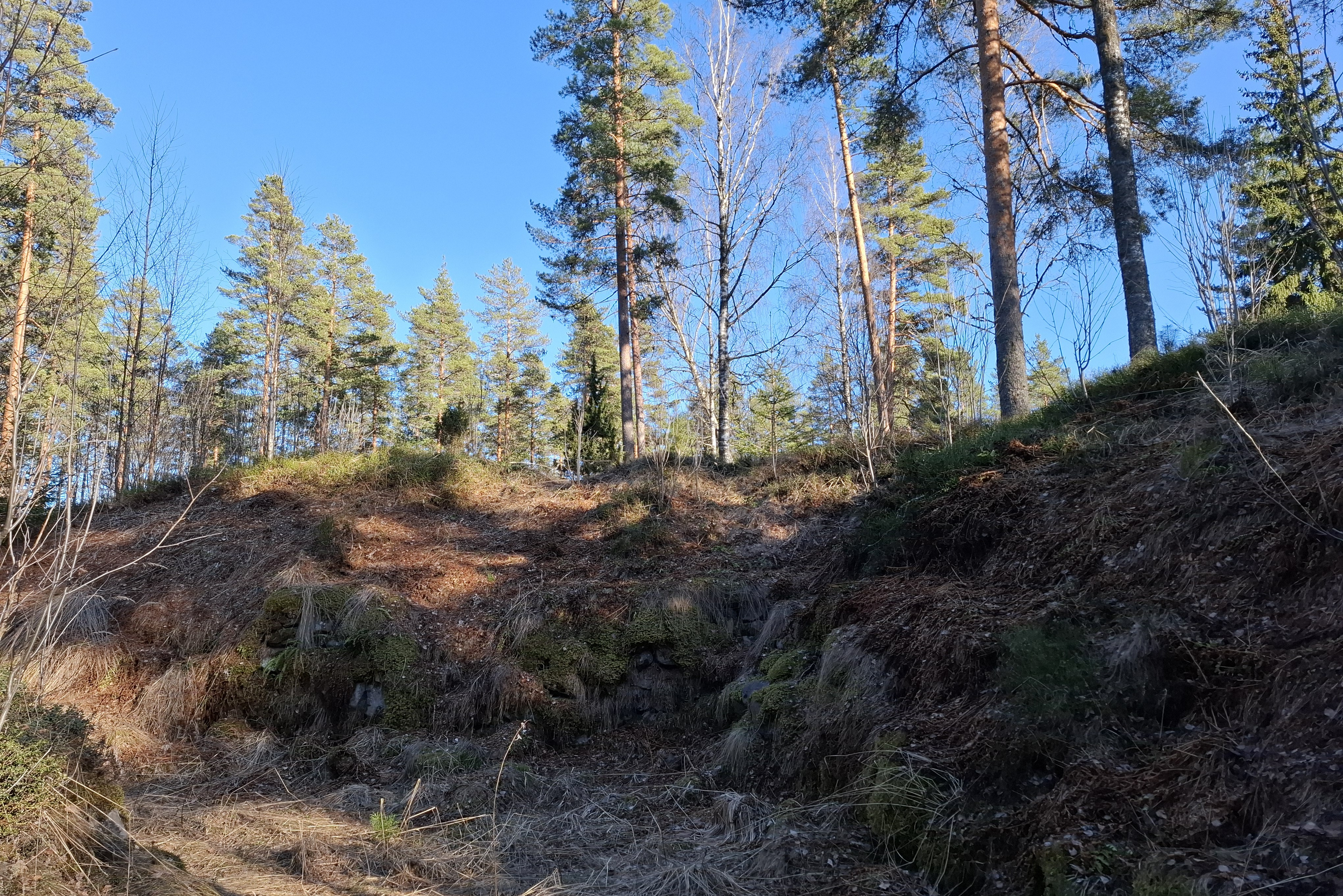
Moat and walls

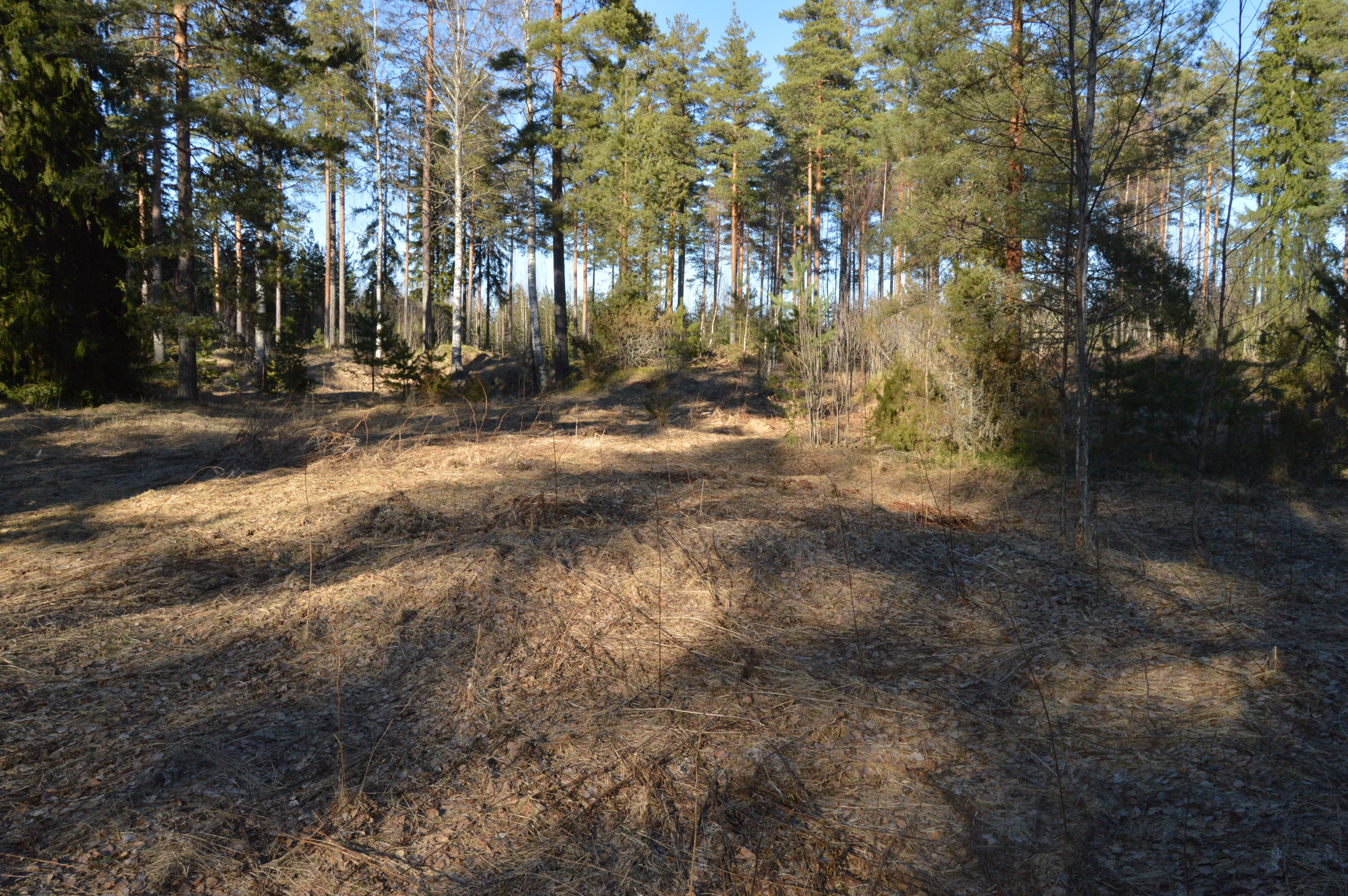
Inner yard of the fortress
