= Kyminlinna =

Fortress in Kotka, Finland

- Part of South-Eastern Finland fortification system
- Finland
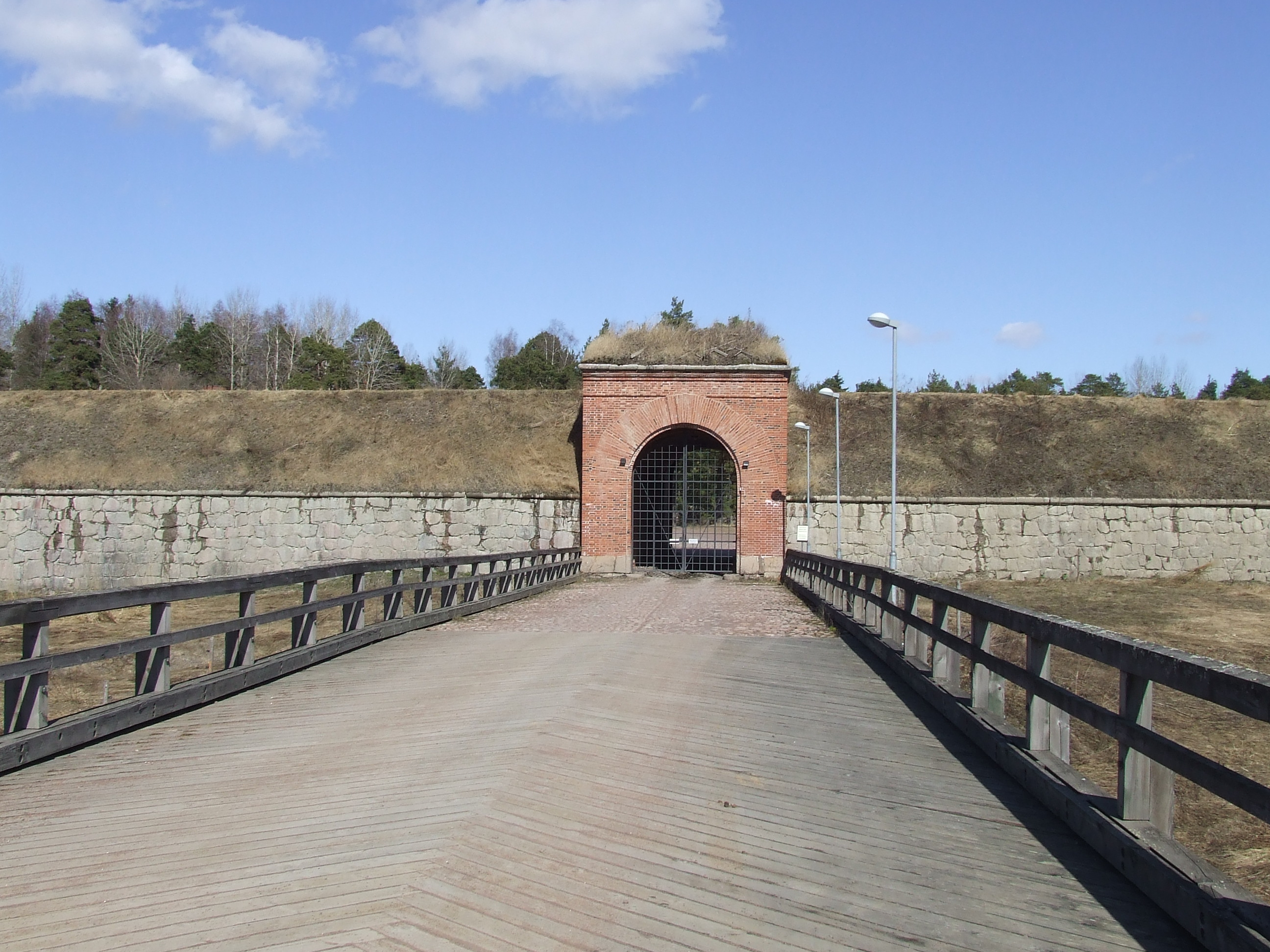
- Kyminlinna main gate

Site information
- Type: Caponier fortress
- Owner: Senate Properties
- Open to the public: no
- Condition: Partly in disrepair

Location
- Kyminlinna
- Coordinates: 60°30′26″N 26°53′19″E
- Area: 74 hectares (180 acres)

Site history
- Built: 1803
- Built by: Russian Empire
- In use: 1808
- Materials: Earth, masonry

Kyminlinna (literally, 'the castle of Kymi') is a fortress located in the northern part of island of Hovinsaari in Kotka, on the south coast of Finland. Kyminlinna is part of the South-Eastern Finland fortification system built by Russia after the Russo-Swedish War of 1788–1790. Kyminlinna formed the northern part of a double fortification, together with Ruotsinsalmi sea fortress, where Kyminlinna was intended to repulse land-based attacks along the King's Road.

== Physical description ==
Kyminlinna is a five-corner-caponier approximately 800 metres (870 yd) in diameter. The surface area of the fortress is approximately 74 hectares (180 acres).

The fortress is surrounded by incomplete moats, which also form part of the ditch system intended to drain the grounds. There is a pond in the area despite the draining intentions.

The eastern part of the ramparts is dissected by the Kotka railway built in 1890, and the Kymintie road built in the early 20th century. The national road 7 goes through the outer ramparts of the southern part of the fortress.

The fortress houses 23 buildings, most of which have been empty after Finnish Defence Forces ceased using the fortress, and which are in varying states of disrepair.

== History ==
The first fortification in the Kyminlinna location was a bastion fortress of a few hundred metres in diameter, built between 1791 and 1795. The construction of the fortress was initially supervised by the Russian Marshall Alexander Suvorov, later followed by the Dutch-born General Jan Pieter van Suchtelen. This so-called 'Suvorov fortress' was demolished to make room for the new, six times larger Kyminlinna, which was built in 1803–1808.

General Suchtelen designed the new fortress and supervised its construction. The fortress was not quite ready by the time Finnish War began, and lost its intended military usefulness after the border between Russia and Sweden moved from Kymi River to Torne River. Kyminlinna did not see action during the Crimean War, when the Ruotsinsalmi sea fortress was destroyed.

During the Finnish Civil War Kyminlinna was used by Red Guards as a training centre. Kyminlinna fortress saw its only battle during the civil war on April 9, 1918, when a German unit attacked the red guards based in the fortress. The battle resulted in few casualties, among them the German soldier Willy Heinz, who is buried in the Kotka old cemetery.

During World War II Kyminlinna was used as refugee camp for Ingrian Finns. The fortress was also used as a prisoner of war camp, tuberculosis hospital and civil guard firing range.

Kyminlinna was used by Finnish Defence Forces between 1939 and 2005.

In 2026 Senate Properties sold the fortress to the city of Kotka for the price of 1 euro with the city planning on renovating and opening it to the public at a later date

== Gallery ==
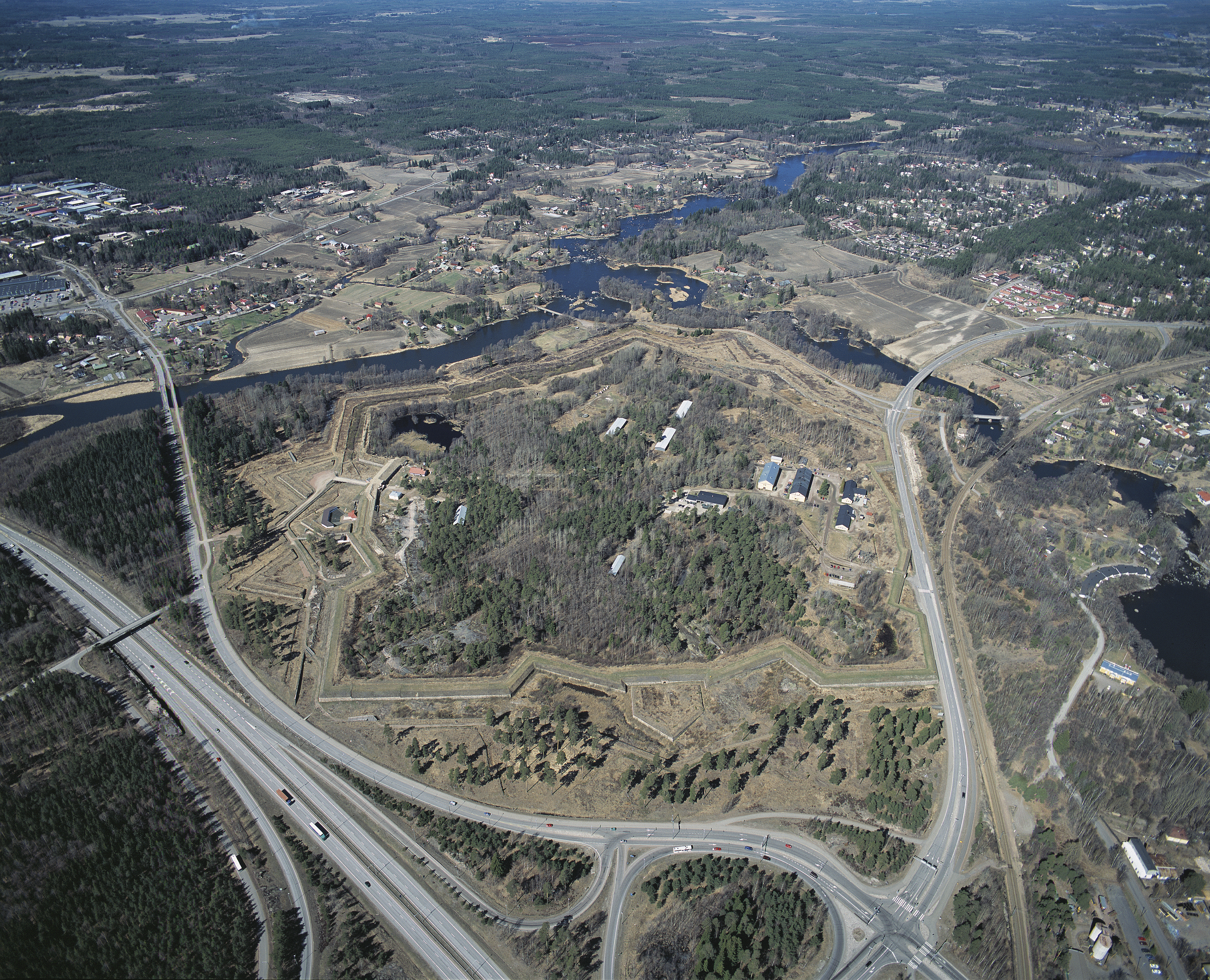
Aerial view

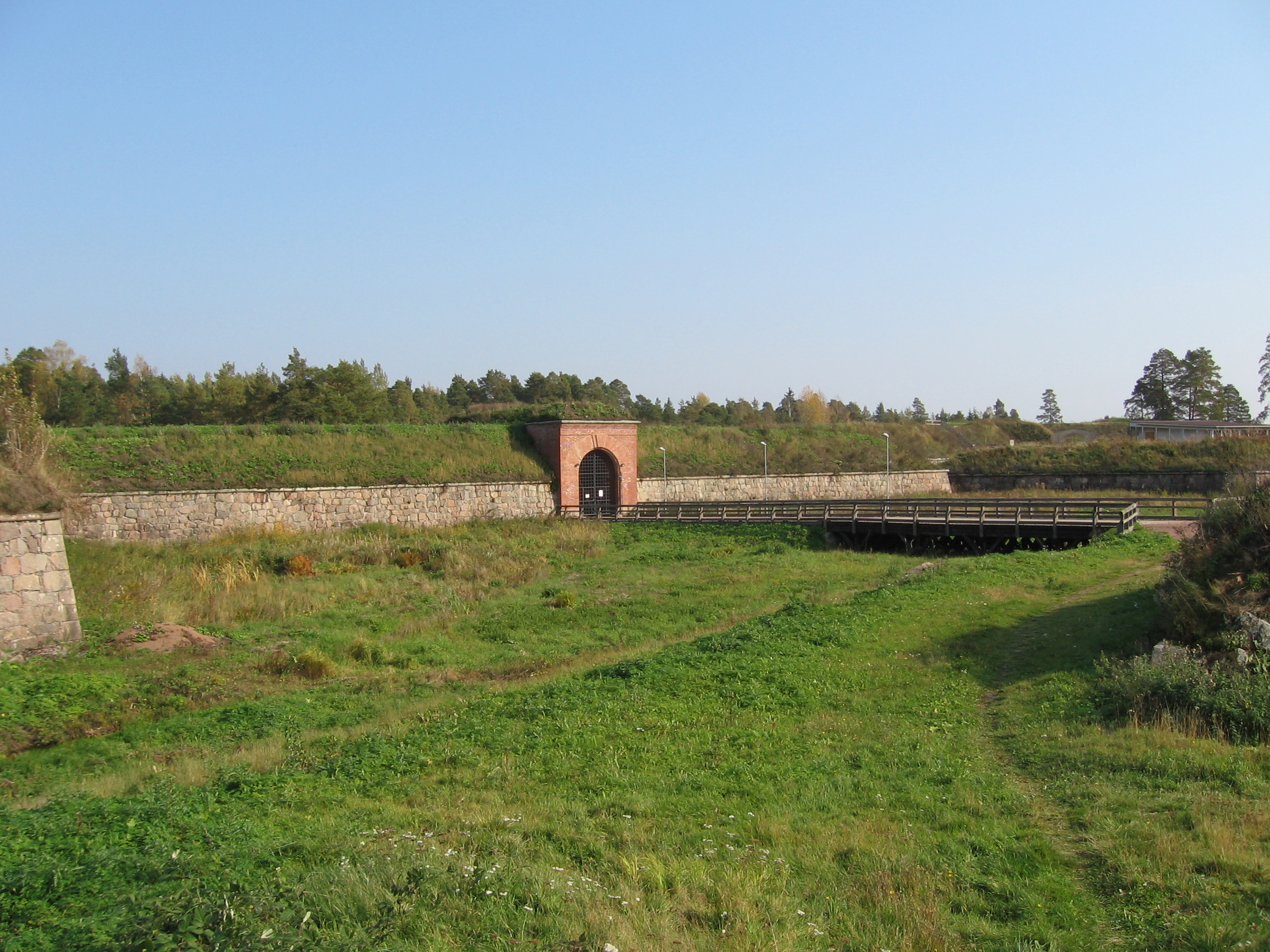
The main gate on the south-western side of the fortress

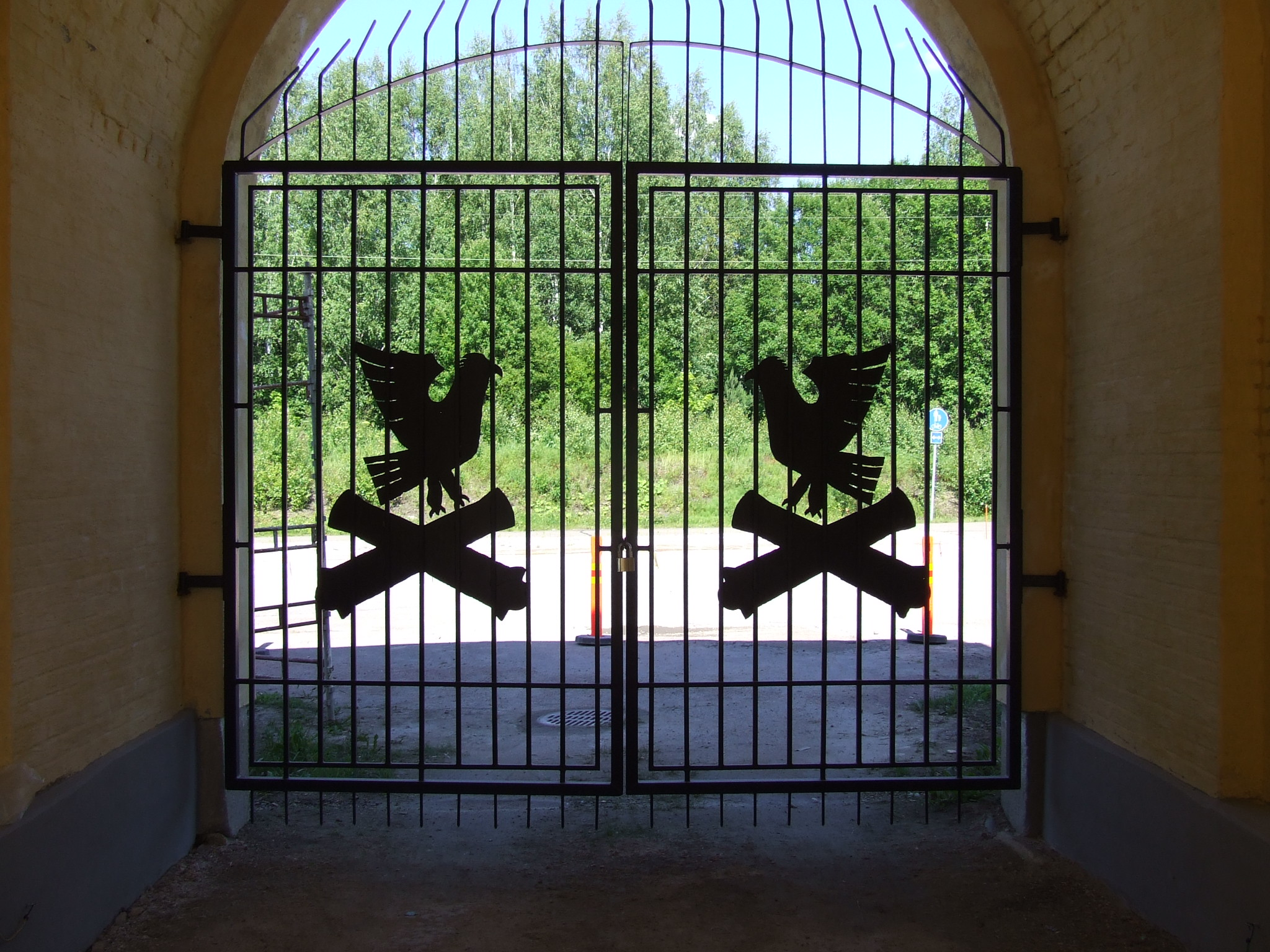
Gate detail

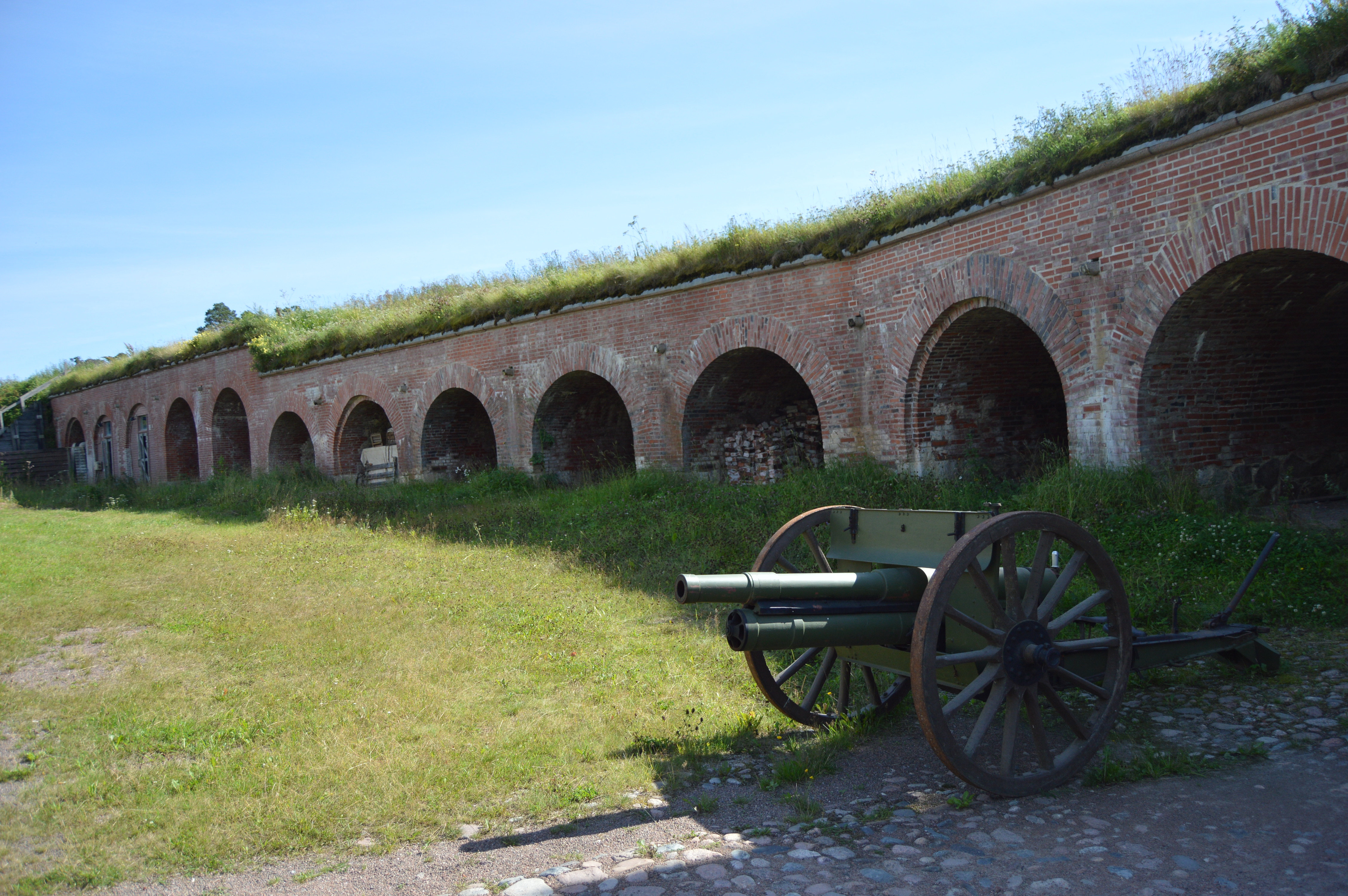
Near the south-western gate

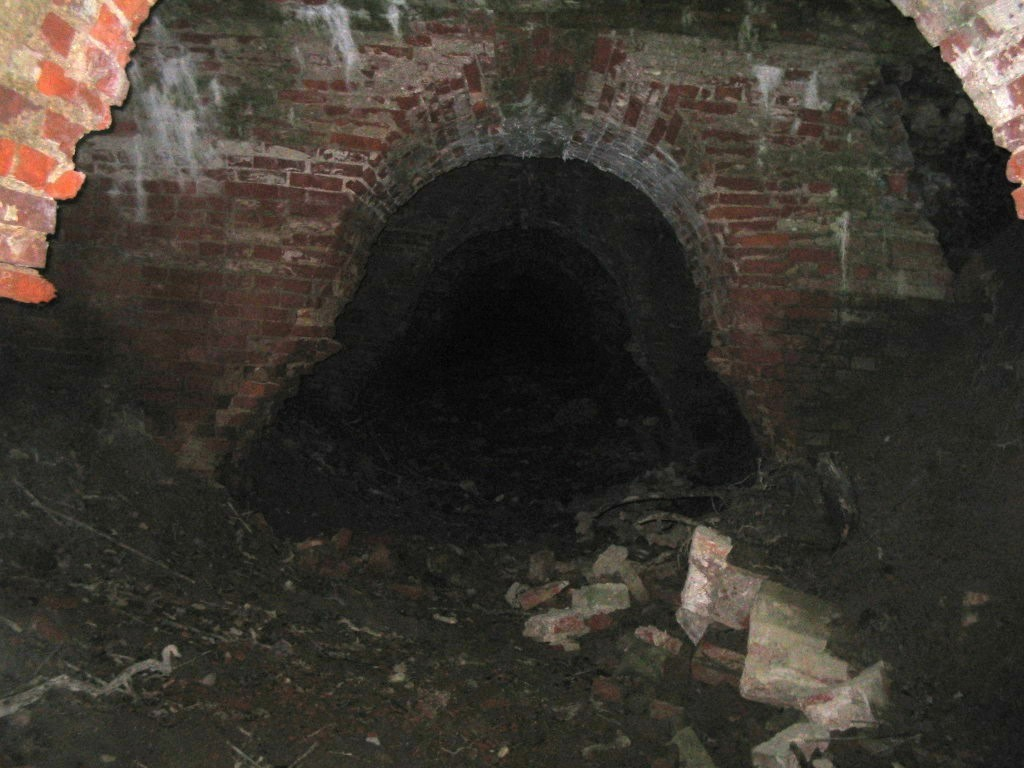
A partially collapsed tunnel

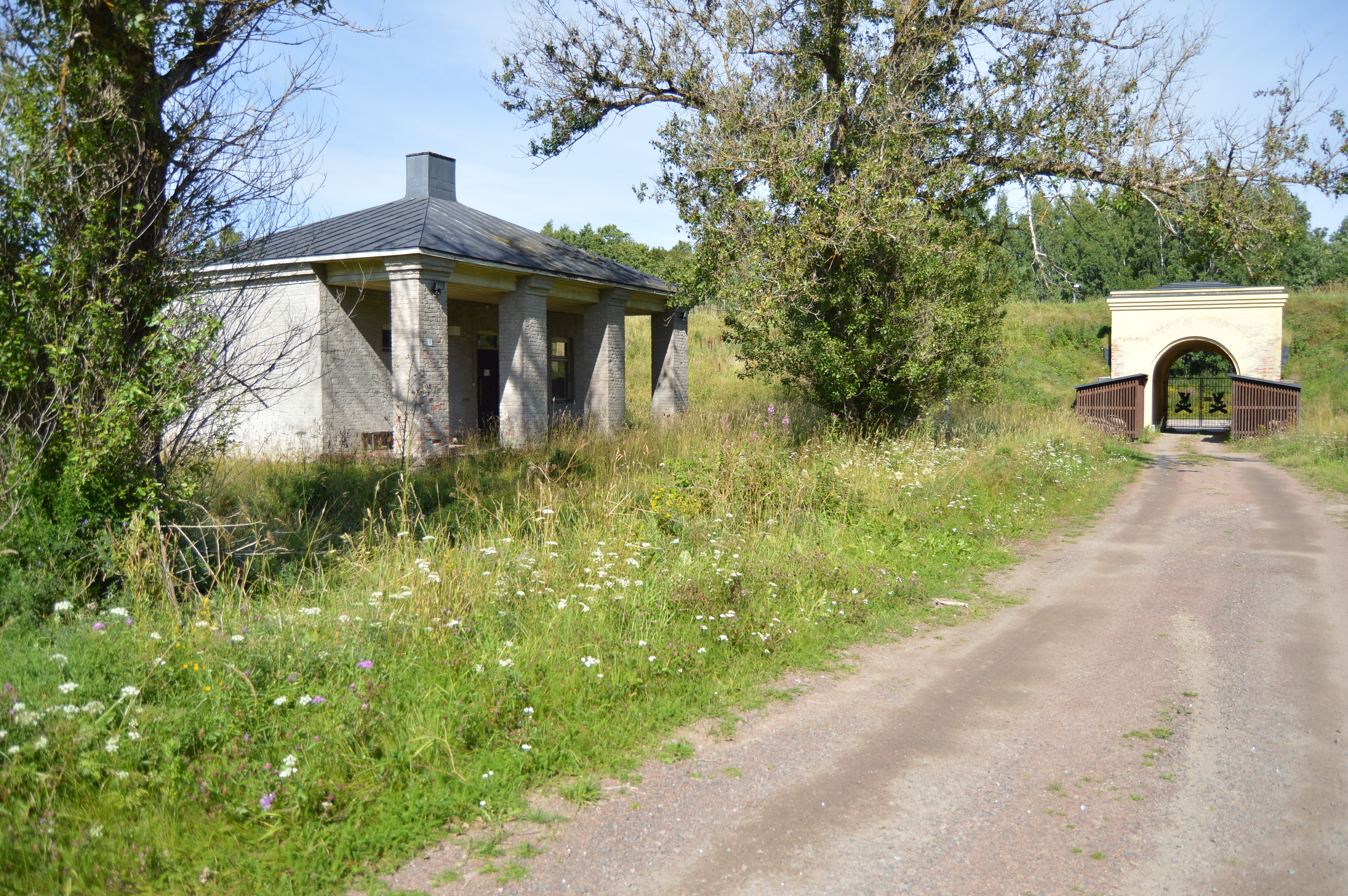
Guardhouse and the north-eastern gate of the fortress
