= Utti Fortress =

Fortress in Utti, Finland

Coordinates: 60.8895°N 26.8977°E

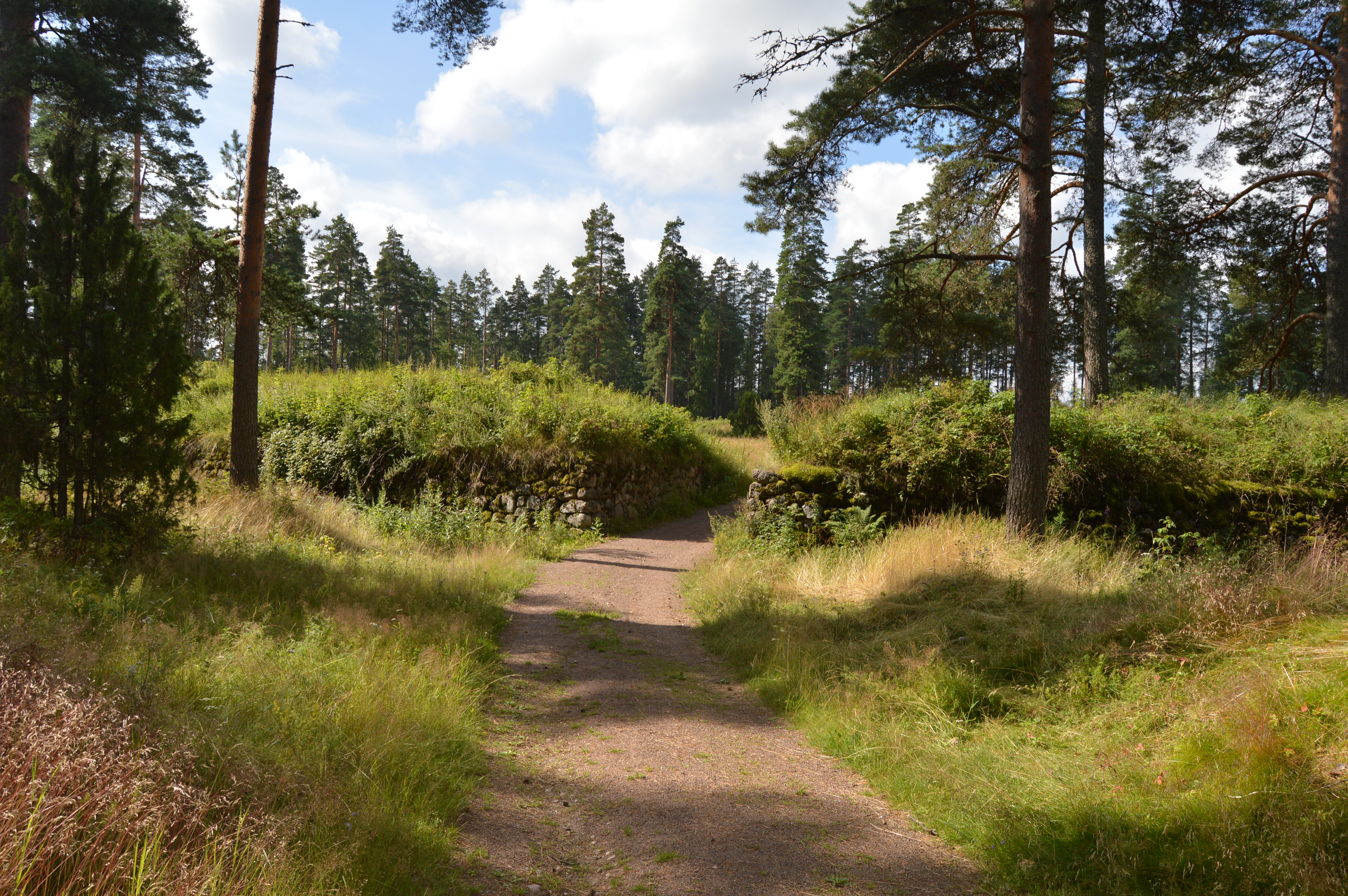
Remains of the Utti fortress.

Utti Fortress is a bastion fortress in Utti, Finland. It was built in 1790s as a part of a larger South-Eastern Finland fortification system to protect Saint Petersburg, the capital of Russian Empire.

The fortress was built around the area of the Battle of Utti that was fought during the Russo-Swedish War in 1789. During the battle, Russians had noted that the narrow passage between the Haukkajärvi lake and the Haukkasuo bog was suitable for a fortress, as it was difficult to bypass.

Construction process started in 1791 and finished in 1792. Around 1100 men took part in the construction, some being from the military and some from the countryside nearby. Within the fortress were barracks, officers quarters, stables, guardhouse and gunpowder magazine. It could house up to 400 soldiers. The fortress was armed at the beginning with 14 cannons and 2 howitzers, but later it had up to 24 cannons.

There were plans of expanding the fortress, so that the old fortress would have been encircled by the newer one. The plans were never put in motion, as after the Finnish War the border was moved to the Gulf of Bothnia and the fortress system lost its importance. Fortress was never fully completed, and it was ultimately shut down in 1809.
