= Liikkala Fortress =

Fortress in Kouvola, Finland

Coordinates: 60.7047°N 27.0049°E

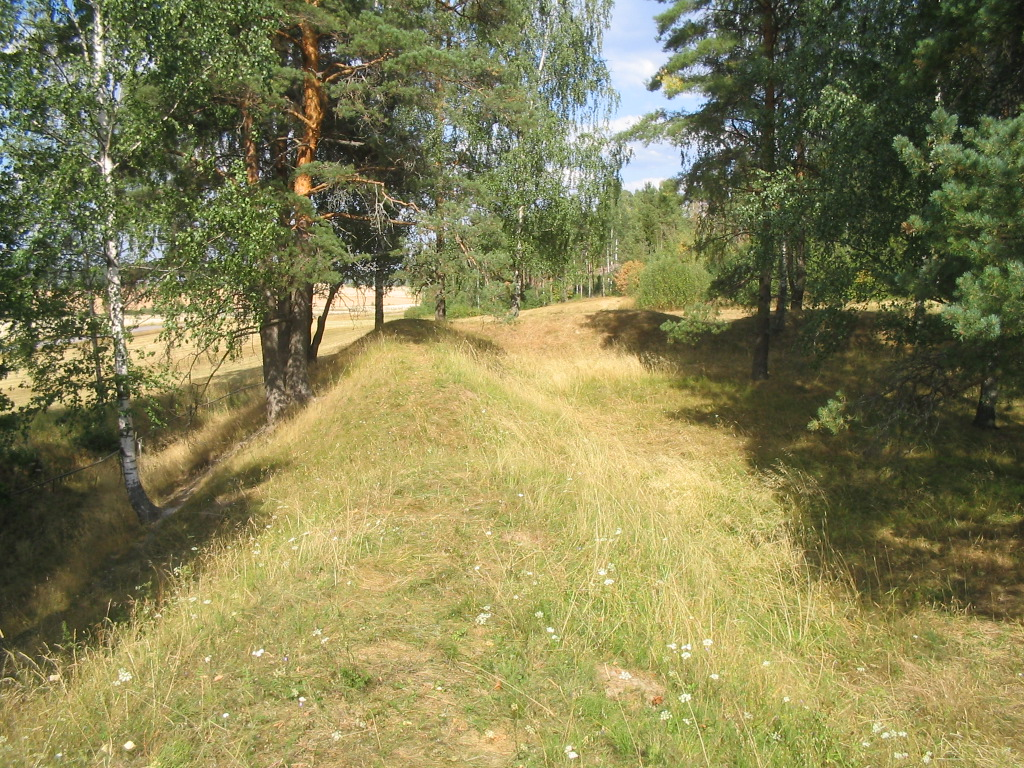
Remains of the Liikkala Fortress

Liikkala Fortress is a fortress in Kouvola, Finland. It was built in 1790s as a part of a larger South-Eastern Finland fortification system to protect Saint Petersburg, the capital of the Russian Empire.

Liikkala is located at the crossroad of four roads from Anjala, Hamina, Kouvola and Kaipiainen. During the Hats' War of 1741–1743, Russians built a military camp in the area, and the oldest fortifications might be from that time. During the Russo-Swedish War of 1788–1790, the importance of the fortifications became evident as the Swedish troops tried to push through Liikkala towards Hamina. In 1790, Russians started to construct the Liikkala Fortress as an outpost of the Hamina Fortress, so that reinforcements could be called from Hamina when needed.

After the Finnish War, the border was moved to the Gulf of Bothnia, and the fortress system lost its importance and was eventually abandoned. During the Winter War, an anti-aircraft gun was posted on the fortress hill.
