= Taavetti Fortress =

Fortress in Finland

Coordinates: 60.9227°N 27.5575°E

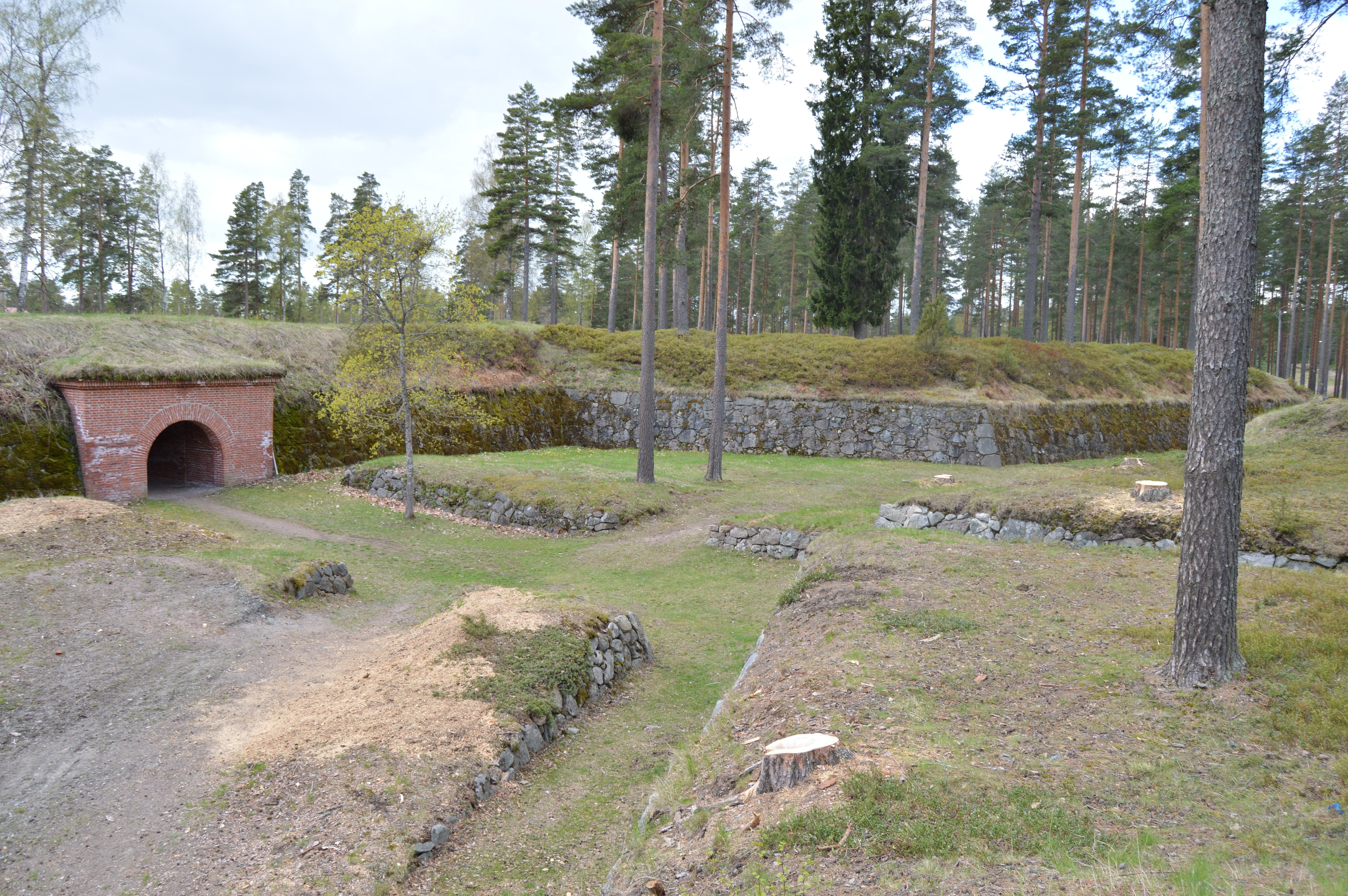

Taavetti Fortress (Finnish: Taavetin linnoitus), is a fortress located in Taavetti in the municipality of Luumäki in Finland.

== History ==
Taavetti Fortress was built at a strategically important road junction at the southern end of the Salpausselkä. The walls of the fortress give it an almost circular shape.This Fortress is part of the southeastern Finnish fortification system built by Russia after the Russo-Swedish War of 1788–1790.

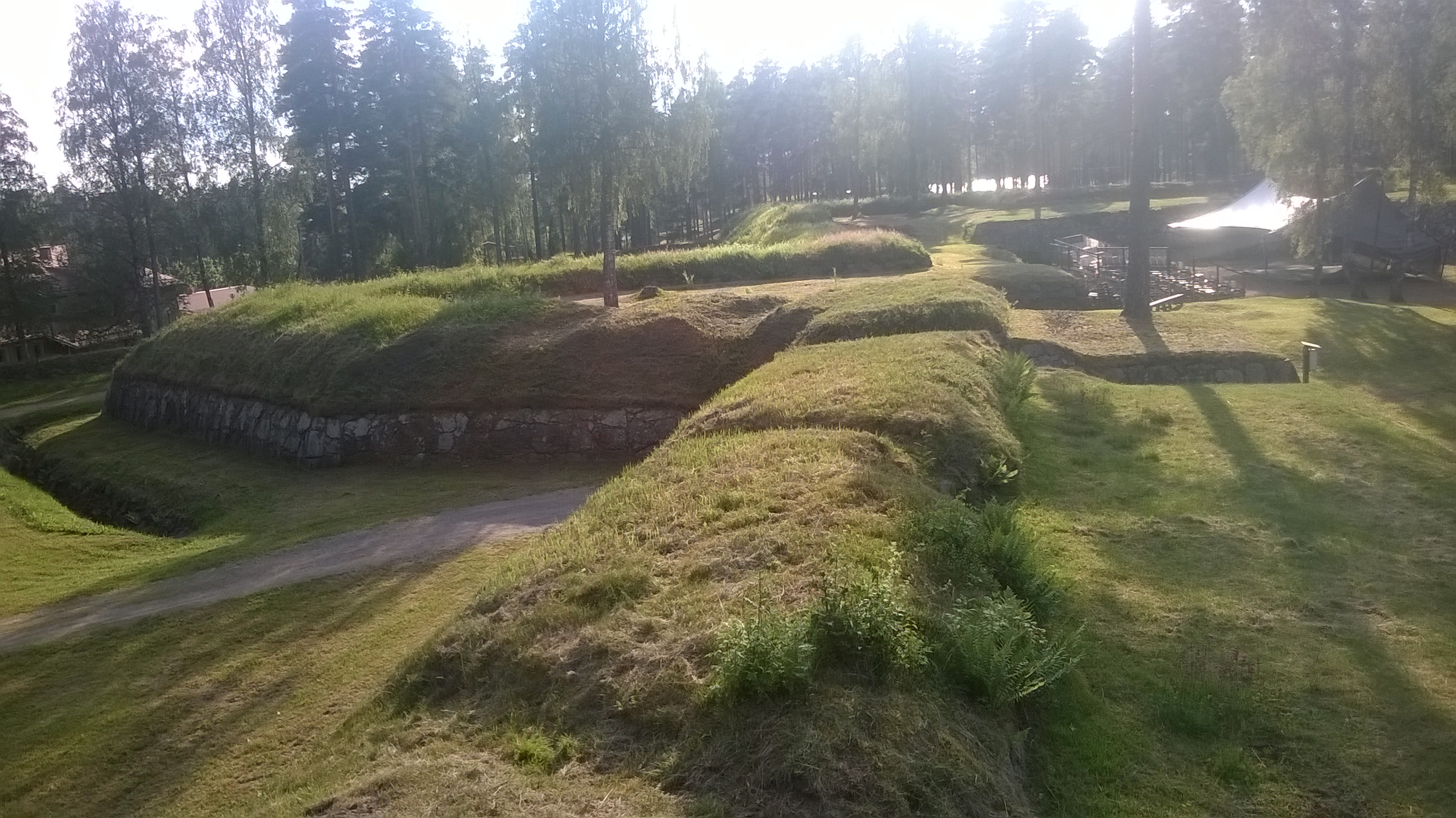
The southern part of the fortress of Taavetti.

During the first phase of construction which extends from 1773 to 1781, a fortress is built consisting of ramparts, measuring approximately 650 x 800 meters. During the second phase of construction from 1791 to 1796, the interior buildings of the fortress were raised. Military use of the fortress ceased in 1803 before the war in Finland.

The ruins of the fortress were restored in the 1980s and open-air events are held here.

The Finnish Heritage Agency has listed Taavetti Fortress as a Built Cultural Site of National Interest in Finland.
