= Hamina Fortress =

Fortress in Finland

- Hamina, Finland
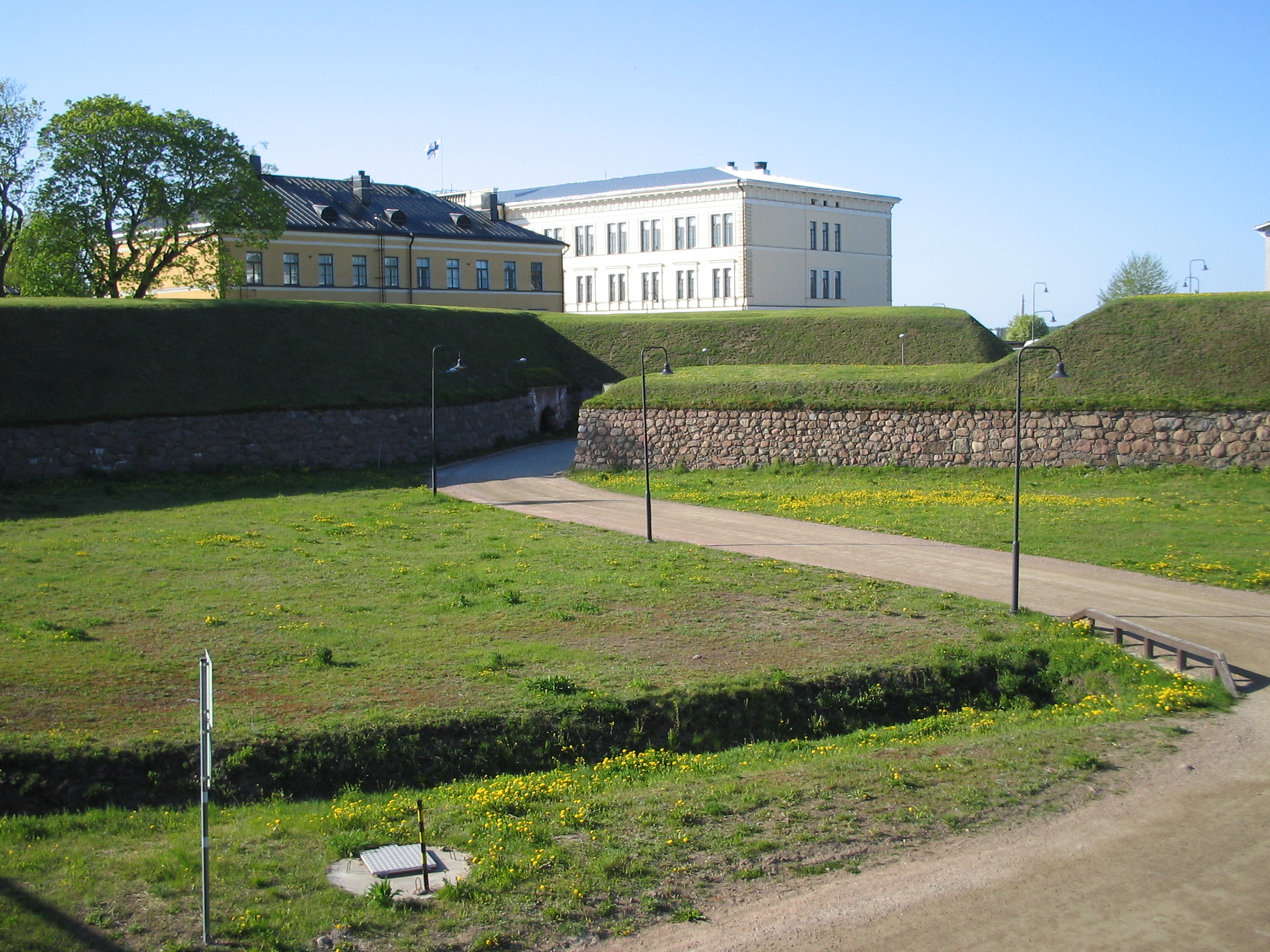
- Walls of the Hamina fortress

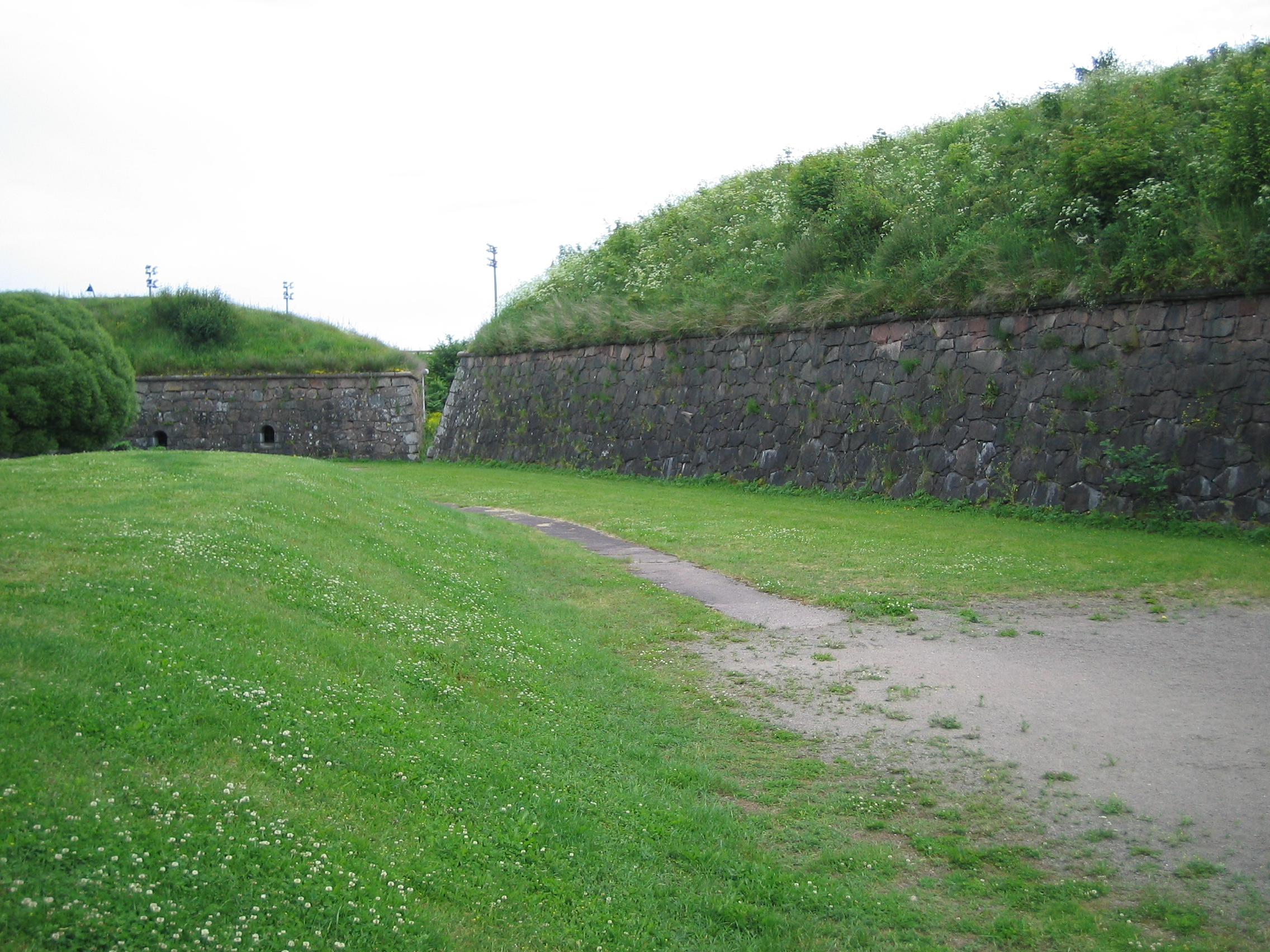
- Caponier and main fortress wall

Site information
- Type: Fortress
- Controlled by: 1721–1743 Sweden; 1743–1917 Russian Empire; 1917–present Finland

Location
- Hamina Fortress shown within modern-day Finland
- Coordinates: 60.569°N 27.197°E

Site history
- Built: 1721–, 1791–1792, 1803
- In use: 1721–1836, 1845–1855 (as fortress) 1836–present (as garrison)

Hamina Fortress (Finnish: Haminan linnoitus) is located in Finland on the coast of the Gulf of Finland and it is an integral part of the Hamina city centre. Hamina fortress is a Star fort, representing the Renaissance ideal city embodied by Palmanova city in northeastern Italy.

== Construction ==
The location of the fortress used to be the marketplace of the Vehkalahti, which had received city rights in 1653 under the name of Vehkalahden Uusikaupunki. The city was destroyed in the Great Northern War in 1712. The construction of the fortress began by Swedish general Axel von Löwen after the Treaty of Nystadt in early 1720s. Von Löwen wanted to prevent the Russian advance into the Gulf of Finland as envisioned by the Tsar Peter the Great, who wanted to open the sea routes for Russia. Alongside the Hamina fortress, the construction of another fortress also began in Lappeenranta.

Protected by the six bastions, named after other Finnish fortified cities, of the fortress the garrison was responsible for defending the city and the coastal road.

After the Russo-Swedish War of 1741–1743 the still-unfinished fortress had to surrender to Russian troops and the area was annexed by Russia. General Alexander Suvorov continued the construction of the fortress.

== 19th century ==
At the beginning of the 19th century Hamina fortress, one of the many fortresses that were reinforced as part of the South-Eastern Finland fortification system. Dutch-born general Jan Pieter van Suchtelen considered the fortress obsolescent and inadequate, so the north-facing defences on the shore of Kirkkojärvi lake were demolished and replaced with a new large masonry bastion according to Caponier system in 1803.

After the border between Russia and Sweden moved westwards to Torne River from Kymi River as result of the Finnish War, the fortress was abandoned in the 1830s and the Tsar Nicholas I gave the fortress area to Hamina town. Simultaneously, the position of the commander of the fortress was dissolved.

Hamina fortress saw action again in the Crimean War. The fortress was reinforced and the position of the fortress commander was re-established for the duration of the war.

== Fortress today ==
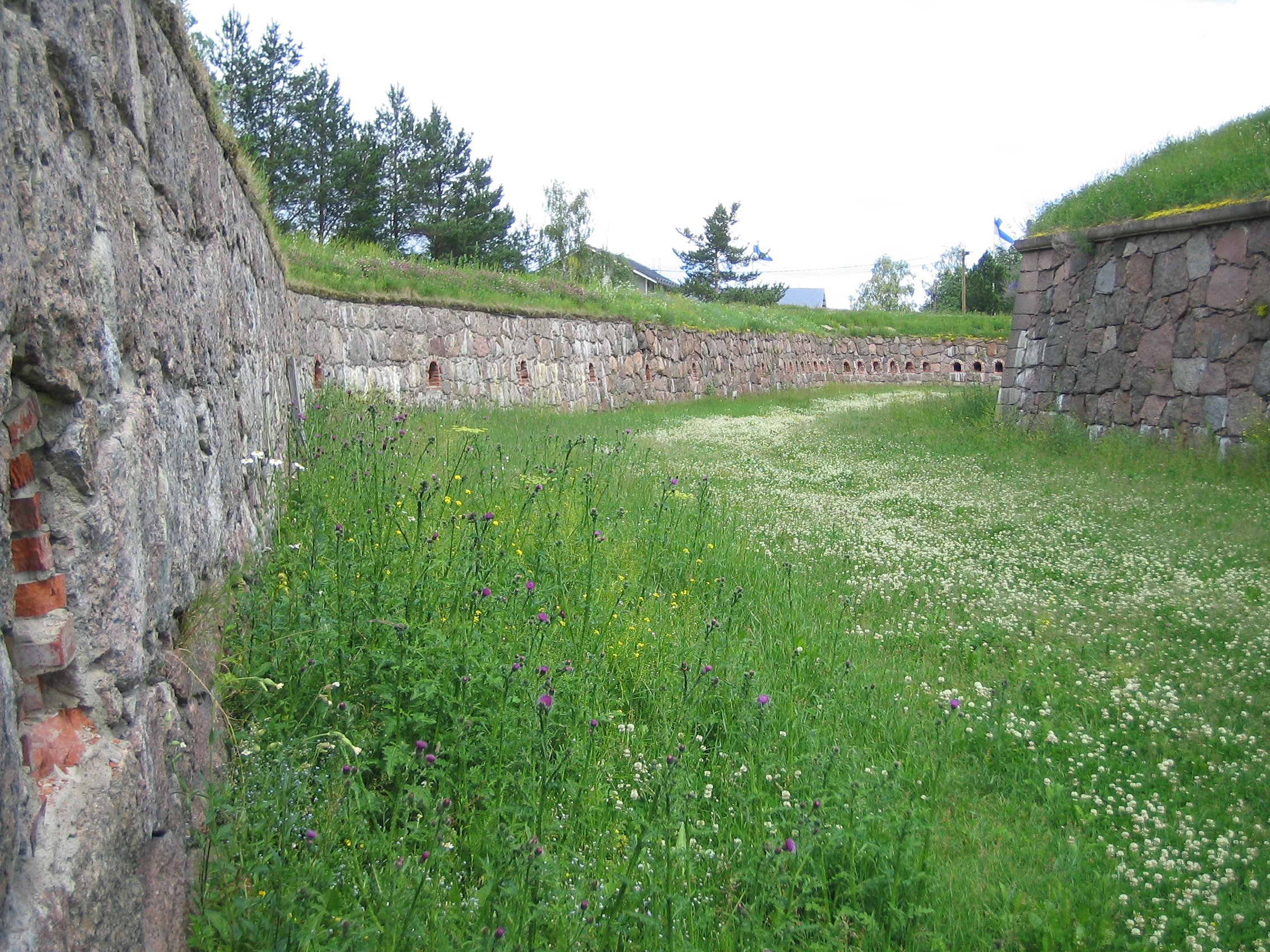
Gallery and fortress wall

The restoration of the fortress began in 1957 and since the 1980s Finnish National Board of Antiquities has been responsible for the renovating the fortress structures. Much of the fortress remains to this day, and it is used as a venue for different events. Perhaps the most notable is the Hamina Tattoo, an international military music event held bi-annually in Hamina. Parts of the fortress are still in military use, as the Finnish Reserve Officer School is located in the fortress.
