= Lappeenranta Fortress =

Coordinates: 61°03′58″N 28°11′00″E

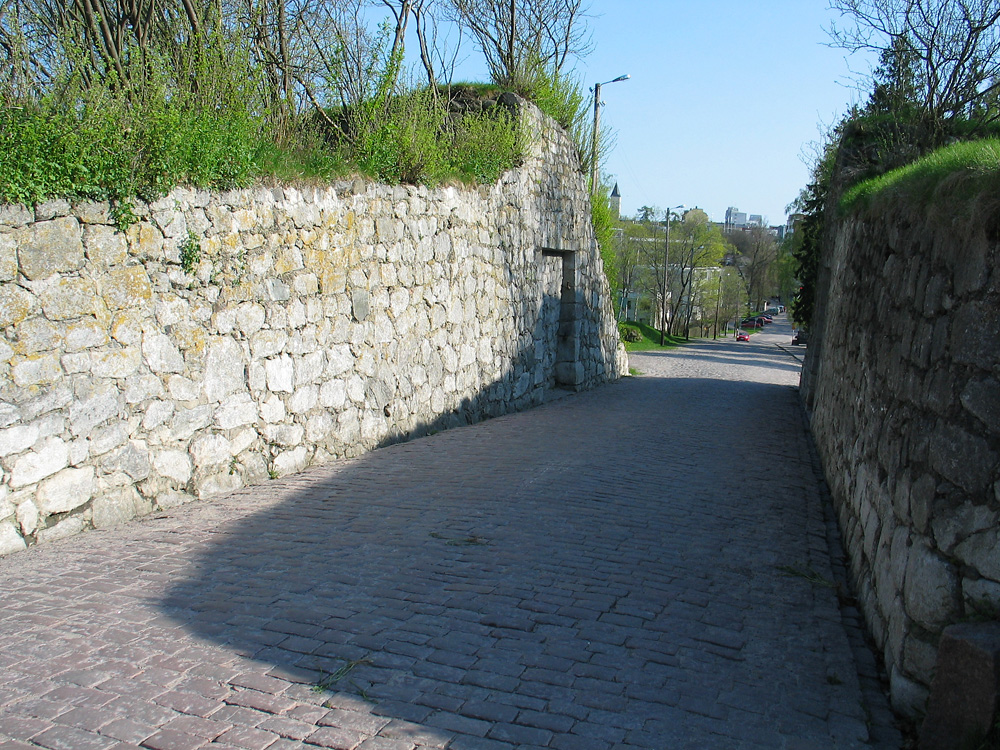
- South gate of the fortress
- Location: Lappeenranta, Finland

Lappeenranta Fortress (Finnish: Lappeenrannan linnoitus) is a fortress located in Lappeenranta, Finland.

== History ==
In 1649, after a visit to Vipuri, the Governor-General of Finland, Per Brahe the Younger, decided to establish a new town near the waterways. The land use plan was compiled in 1649 by Erik Nilsson Aspgren.

On September 20, 1652, the Diet of Stockholm decided to grant special rights to Lappeenranta. In early 1653, Erik Nilsson Aspgren handed over special rights to the governor Johann Rosenhan.

After the Treaty of Nystad, in the fall of 1721, Sweden established a border commission headed by Axel Löwen, general and state counsellor. In 1722, Axel Löwen established a small garrison to ensure the crossing of the border and the return of refugees. Axel Löwen, Johann Henrik Friesenheim and Brent-Olof Stockenberg then decided to strengthen Lappeenranta. To secure the Lappeenranta bitumen trade, pits and chevaux de frise were set up and 112 soldiers were sent to protect the trading post. In 1723, the brothers Carl Friedrich and Anders Johann Nordenberg were chosen to design the castle along with Jacob Johann Faber. Most of the construction work was done between 1722 and 1728.

When the Hat Party came to power in the late 1730s, it allocated additional funds to expand the fortifications, led by Adam Reinhardt Bruno. However, the fortification work was stopped by the Russo-Swedish War of 1741–1743.

== Russian garrison, 1743–1812 ==
At the beginning of Russian rule, the border guard regiments were often changed. The Lappeenranta fortifications were rebuilt in the 1750s. In the 1790s, the castle came under the command of Alexander Suvorov, who continued to develop it as part of the fortification system of southeastern Finland. During the Russo-Swedish War, the Saimaa fleet became the third garrison of Lappeenranta.

In 1785, during the Russian period, the Orthodox Church of Lappeenranta was also built, making it the oldest Orthodox church of Finland.

== The camp of prisoners of war ==
After the Finnish Civil War, the White Guards (Finland) established the Lappeenranta prison camp at the castle, which was notorious for the arbitrary executions that took place there. This camp had nearly 3000 Red Guard prisoners, about 500 of whom were executed.
