= 1790 in Russia =

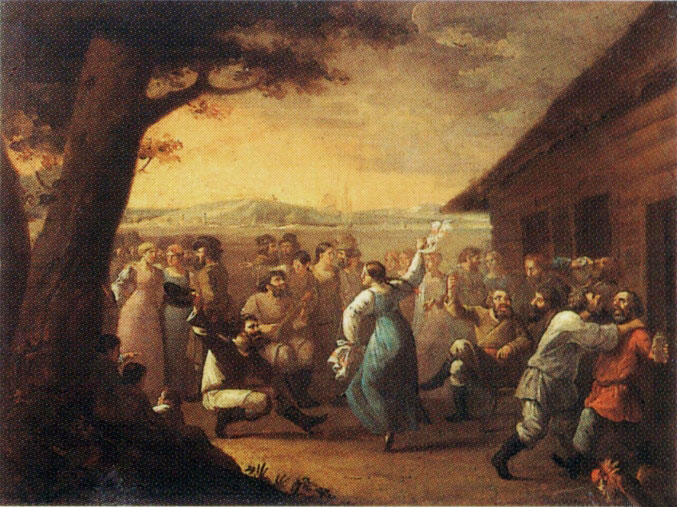
Country feast by anonymous (I.M.Tankov), 1790s (Russian museum)

Events from the year 1790 in Russia

== Incumbents ==
- Monarch – Catherine II

== Events ==
- Russo-Turkish War (1787–1792)
  - May 17–18: Battle of Andros (1790)
  - July 19: Battle of Kerch Strait (1790)
  - September 8–9: Battle of Tendra
  - December 22: Conclusion of Siege of Izmail
- Russo-Swedish War (1788–90)
  - April 29: Battle of Valkeala
  - April 30: Battle of Partakoski
  - May 13: Battle of Reval
  - May 15: Battle of Fredrikshamn
  - May 19–20: Battle of Keltis
  - June 3: Battle of Savitaipale
  - June 3–4: Battle of Kronstadt
  - June 16: Battle of Uransari
  - July 2–3: Battle of Björkösund
  - July 4: Battle of Vyborg Bay (1790)
  - July 9–10: Battle of Svensksund
  - August 14: Treaty of Värälä
- Church of the Ascension (Chaltyr) founded
- Holy Trinity Cathedral of the Alexander Nevsky Lavra completed
- Kokushkin Bridge built
- Journey from St. Petersburg to Moscow by Alexander Radishchev published

== Births ==
- Sima Babovich, Hakham of the Crimean Karaites
- Dmitry Buturlin, general, historian, censor
- Pyotr Yegorovich Chistyakov, explorer, admiral, fifth governor of Russian America
- Matvey Dmitriev-Mamonov, nobleman, writer, and general
- Pyotr Gorchakov, general
- Ivan Liprandi, spy, general, memoirist
- Anastasia Novitskaya, ballerina
- Fedor Panyutin, general
- Platon Shirinsky-Shikhmatov, education minister (1850-1853)
- Mirza Jafar Topchubashev, Russian orientalist and poet from Azerbaijan
- Sergei Petrovich Trubetskoy, military officer and Decembrist organizer
- Alexander von Lüders, general
- Kapiton Zelentsov, artist and illustrator

== Deaths ==
- Ivan Ivanovich Möller-Sakomelsky, general
- Mikhail Ivanovich Popov, writer, poet, dramatist, librettist
- Mikhail Shcherbatov, historian, writer, philosopher, statesman
- Grigory Spiridov, admiral
