= Battle of Partakoski =

1790 battle of the Russo-Swedish War 1788

- Part of the Russo-Swedish War (1788–1790)
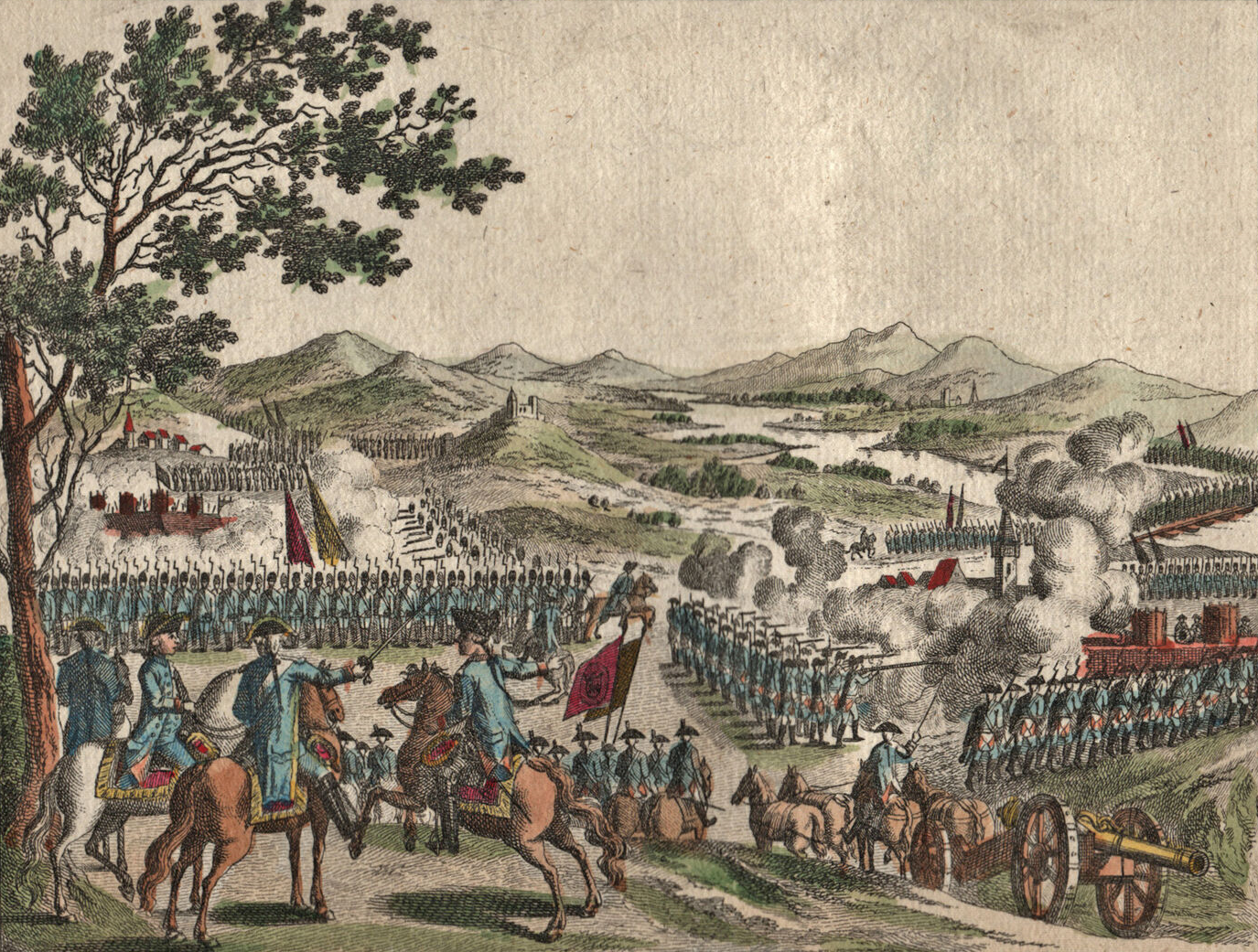
- Armfelt captures Partakoski and Kärnäkoski on 15 April 1790, as depicted in Nordischer Kriegsschauplaz
Date	30 April 1790
Location	Partakoski, Russian Empire (in present-day Savitaipale, Finland)
Result	Swedish victory

Belligerents
Sweden	Russian Empire

Commanders and leaders
Gustaf Mauritz Armfelt; Georg Henrik Jägerhorn; Eberhard von Vegesack	Iosif Igelström; Victor Amadeus of Anhalt-Bernburg (DOW); Jan Pieter van Suchtelen; Vasily Sergeevich Baikov (DOW); Vasily Nikitich Meshchersky; Pyotr Fyodorovich Berchmann

Units involved
Swedish Army: Närke-Värmland Regiment; Dalarna Regiment; Hälsinge Regiment; Jönköping Regiment; Tavastehus Regiment; Savolax Regiment; Älvsborg Regiment; Karelian Dragoon Corps; Savolax Jäger Regiment	Russian Army: Preobrazhensky Life Guards Regiment; Life Grenadier Regiment; Velikolutski Regiment; Yelets Regiment; Cossacks

Strength
3,000–4,000; 11 cannons	6,000; 21 or 22 cannons

Casualties and losses
231: • 41 killed; • 17 captured; • 173 wounded	531: • 130 killed; • 96 captured; • 305 wounded; 2 cannons

The Battle of Partakoski, or the Battle of Partakoski–Kärnäkoski, was fought on 30 April 1790 (Note: According to the Julian calendar, used in Russia at the time, the battle was fought on 19 April 1790.) in the Russo-Swedish War (1788–1790). The engaged Swedish forces were led by Georg Henrik Jägerhorn, as part of a Swedish brigade commanded by Gustaf Mauritz Armfelt. The Russian forces opposing them was under the supreme command of Iosif Igelström, with Victor Amadeus of Anhalt-Bernburg acting as commander in the battle.

In 1790, with the aim of delivering a crushing blow, Swedish king Gustav III bolstered his naval forces for a landing operation against the Russian capital, Saint Petersburg. Several brigades were formed, one of which under Armfelt with 3,000 to 4,000 men, to simultaneously pin down their forces on land. Armfelt swiftly captured the vital Partakoski and Kärnäkoski crossings on 15 April, threatening the rear of the Russian front line at the Kymijoki. In response, Igelström concentrated 6,000 men at nearby Savitaipale to retake them.

On 30 April, while demonstrating against Armfelt's headquarters at Suomenniemi, three Russian columns launched a converged attack on Jägerhorn's position at the crossings. They were repulsed at Partakoski, but broke through the Swedish front at Kärnäkoski. As the Swedes received reinforcements, the Russians were forced to retreat with heavy losses, including mortally wounded Victor Amadeus. The Swedish brigades, however, failed to coordinate an attack, while the naval operation ended in disaster on 3 July. Only a major Swedish victory at Svensksund on 10 July paved the way for peace on 14 August 1790, resulting in status quo ante bellum.

== Background ==
According to the Swedish military plans of 1790, offensives would commence from Savonia and Karelia to tie up Russian forces on land, while troops from their own army would reinforce the navy; the goal was to deliver a quick decisive blow by capturing Saint Petersburg in a landing operation, similar to the strategy of 1788. Accordingly, for land operations, three new brigades were formed north of the main army – one of them under Gustaf Mauritz Armfelt.

=== Armfelt's brigade ===
With 3,000 to 4,000 men and 11 cannons, Armfelt was tasked with capturing Lappeenranta in a surprise offensive at the turn of February-March. The road to Lappeenranta, via Mikkeli and Ristiina, went over the Partakoski and Kärnäkoski straits, and was crucial to both sides. The crossings had been captured by a small Swedish detachment already at the outbreak of hostilities in June 1788, but were lost to a Russian counterattack the next month.

Due to various difficulties, the formation of the brigade was delayed by several weeks. Swedish King Gustav III, who personally supervised the operation, therefore settled on capturing the crossings once it finally commenced on 14 April from Ristiina. This would pull Russian troops from the front line at the Kymijoki river into Savitaipale, to defend their rear line of communication.

=== Swedish offensive ===
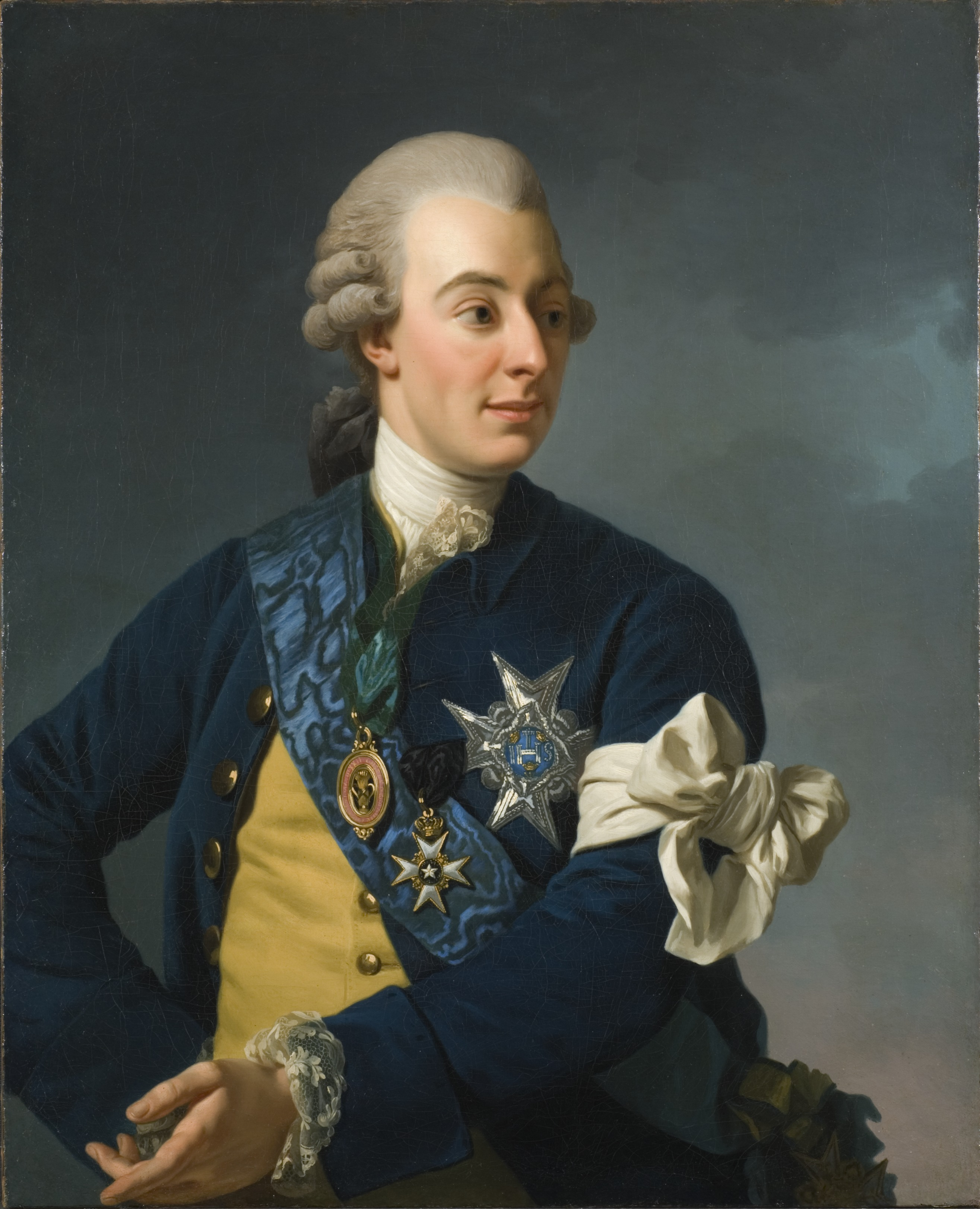
King of Sweden, Gustav III, in 1772

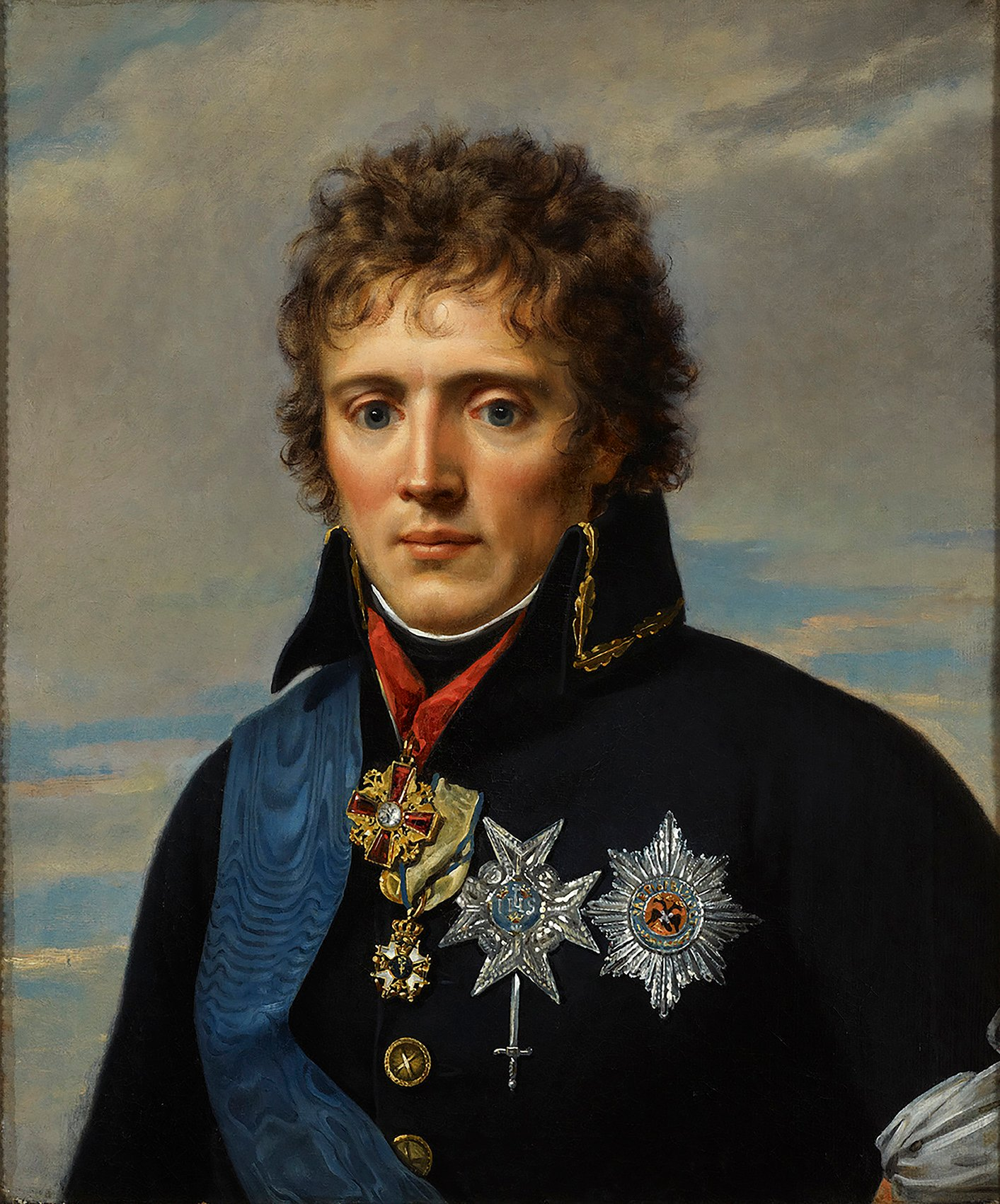
Swedish brigade commander, Gustaf Mauritz Armfelt, c. 1800

Opposing the Swedes were several outposts under Lieutenant Colonel Petrowitz, from General Major Suchtelen's Russian army. Petrowitz had 500 to 600 men with two cannons at the Partakoski and Kärnäkoski straits, barely 200 on Kuivasensaari, 100 at Suomenniemi, and a detachment on Laamalansaari. A plan to catch him by surprise was devised by Lieutenant Colonel Jägerhorn, who formed a vanguard of at least 740 men to that effect. (Note: Jägerhorn recounts 300 Dalarna reserves, 180 Hälsinge reserves, 240 men from the Jönköping regiment, and 20 Karelian jägers. Six cannons of varying sizes were brought with them. According to Pihlström, the vanguard included 475 men from the Dalarna reserve battalion, including 30 officers and 32 non-commissioned officer.) At 11:00 on 15 April, some 1.25 km (0.78 mi) north of Partakoski, Jägerhorn loaded his troops onto 60 sledges to gain speed. He would be followed at a distance by the main Swedish force under the king and Armfelt.

Major Fahnehjelm with a Jönköping battalion diverged left to Kuivasensaari, while Eberhard von Vegesack, spearheading the assault with the Dalarna reserve battalion, raced to Partakoski. The Swedes arrived just after noon and achieved total surprise, capturing the heights and a cannon north of the bridge. Vegesack pursued the Russians over the bridge with additional support from the Hälsinge reserves and, notwithstanding the fire from the buildings, captured the second cannon. The Swedes subsequently stormed a redoubt at the Patterinmäki hill to the southwest, while Fahnehjelm dislodged the Russians from Kuivasensaari. They made a new stand at Kärnäkoski, but were forced back to Savitaipale as soon as the Swedish main forces arrived.

Swedish losses amounted to six killed and 18 wounded. The Russians lost at least 14 killed (Note: Ulfhielm estimates that one officer and 212 Russian privates had been killed in the fighting.) and 39 captured, as well as two cannons and rich spoils of war. Armfelt and Gustav III arrived only after fighting had ceased. Armfelt established his headquarters at Suomenniemi, which had been abandoned by the Russians and occupied by the Swedes on 18 April. The king travelled south after the skirmish, to lead the main army's divisions in an offensive over the Kymijoki.

== Staging phase ==
With Partakoski and Kärnäkoski lost, and the centre of their operational line penetrated, the Russians abandoned any plans of a major coastal offensive in the south. Instead, they began pulling troops from the Kymijoki to secure their rear. Ivan Saltykov, the Russian commander-in-chief, tasked Iosif Igelström with retaking the crossings before the thawing of the surrounding waters, and the Swedish fortifications became too formidable.

=== Swedish defences ===
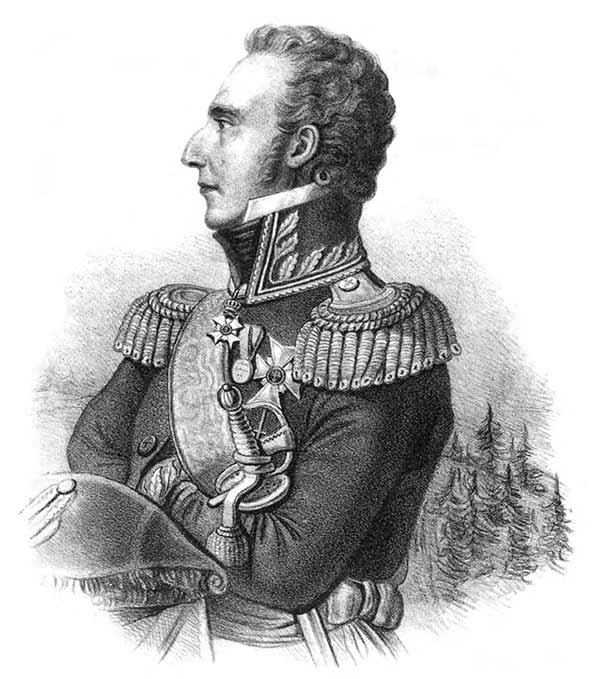
Eberhard von Vegesack, leading the Swedish forces at Kärnäkoski

On the day of battle, Jägerhorn was entrusted the overall command at Partakoski and Kärnäkoski with 1,400 men. He led nearly half of them in the centre, at Partakoski and the Patterinmäki redoubt, in two weak Närke-Värmland battalions and two cannons. Vegesack led the front, with his left wing defending the Kärnäkoski bridge with 120 Värmlanders and three cannons in a breastwork, 1.2 km (0.75 mi) south-southeast of Partakoski. About 480 Dalarna and Hälsinge reserves and a cannon formed his right wing, 400 m (1,300 ft) south where the strait widened. Their jäger detachments held Lapinsalo (north of Partakoski), while pickets guarded Ratasalo and Parranniemi, 2.5 km (1.6 mi) southwest and 2.2 km (1.4 mi) west of Partakoski, respectively.

Armfelt was headquartered at Suomenniemi, 15 km (9.3 mi) northwest of Partakoski, where a third Närke-Värmland battalion and a Tavastehus battalion with a company were garrisoned in reserve. To the left of Partakoski were two Jönköping battalions at Kuivainen, and a reinforcing Savolax battalion (200 men) on Laamalansaari, 3 km (1.9 mi) and 9 km (5.6 mi) north, respectively. The brigade also included a few Karelian dragoons, Savolax jägers, and parts of an Älvsborg battalion.

=== Russian plan of attack ===
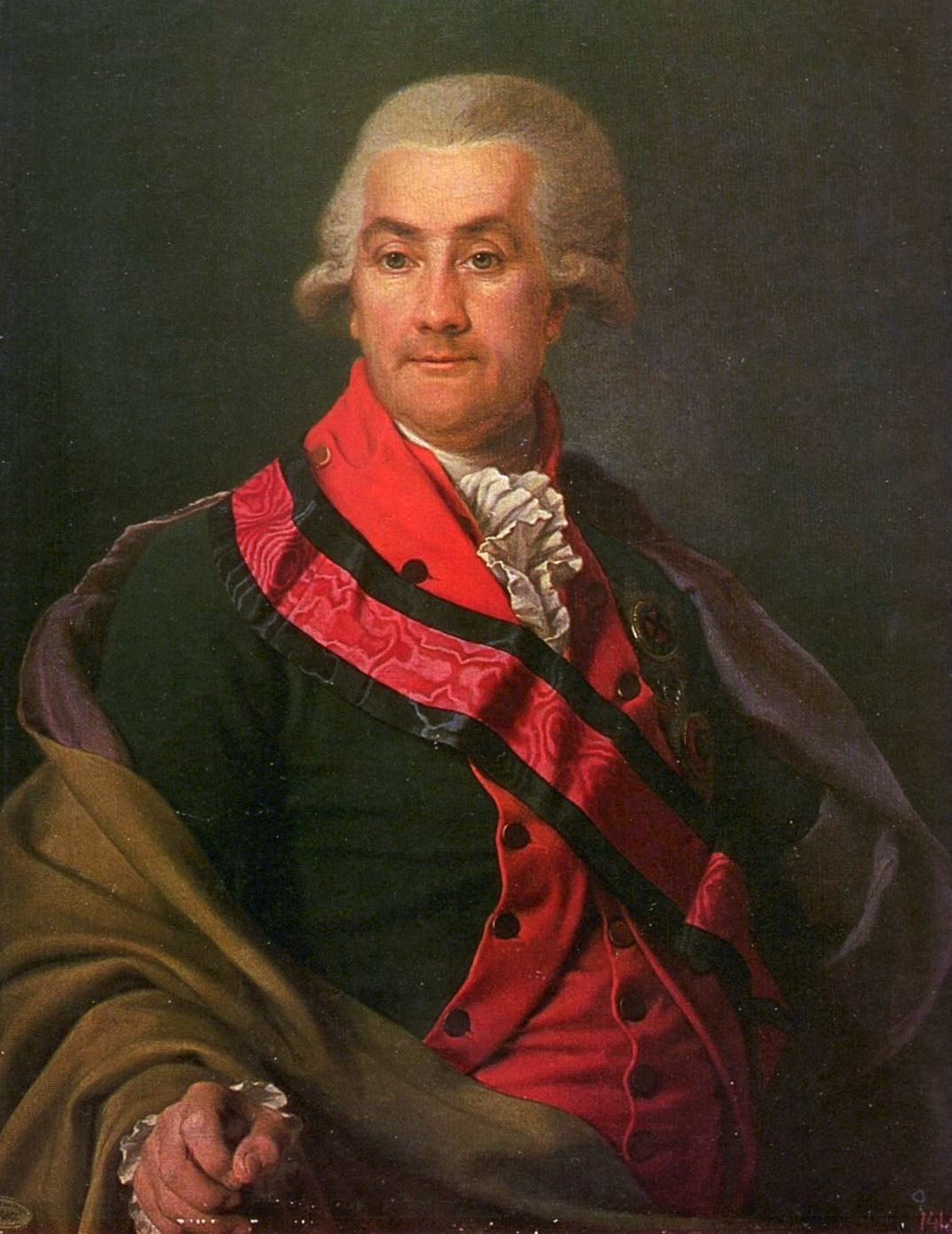
Russian supreme commander, Iosif Igelström, c. 1790

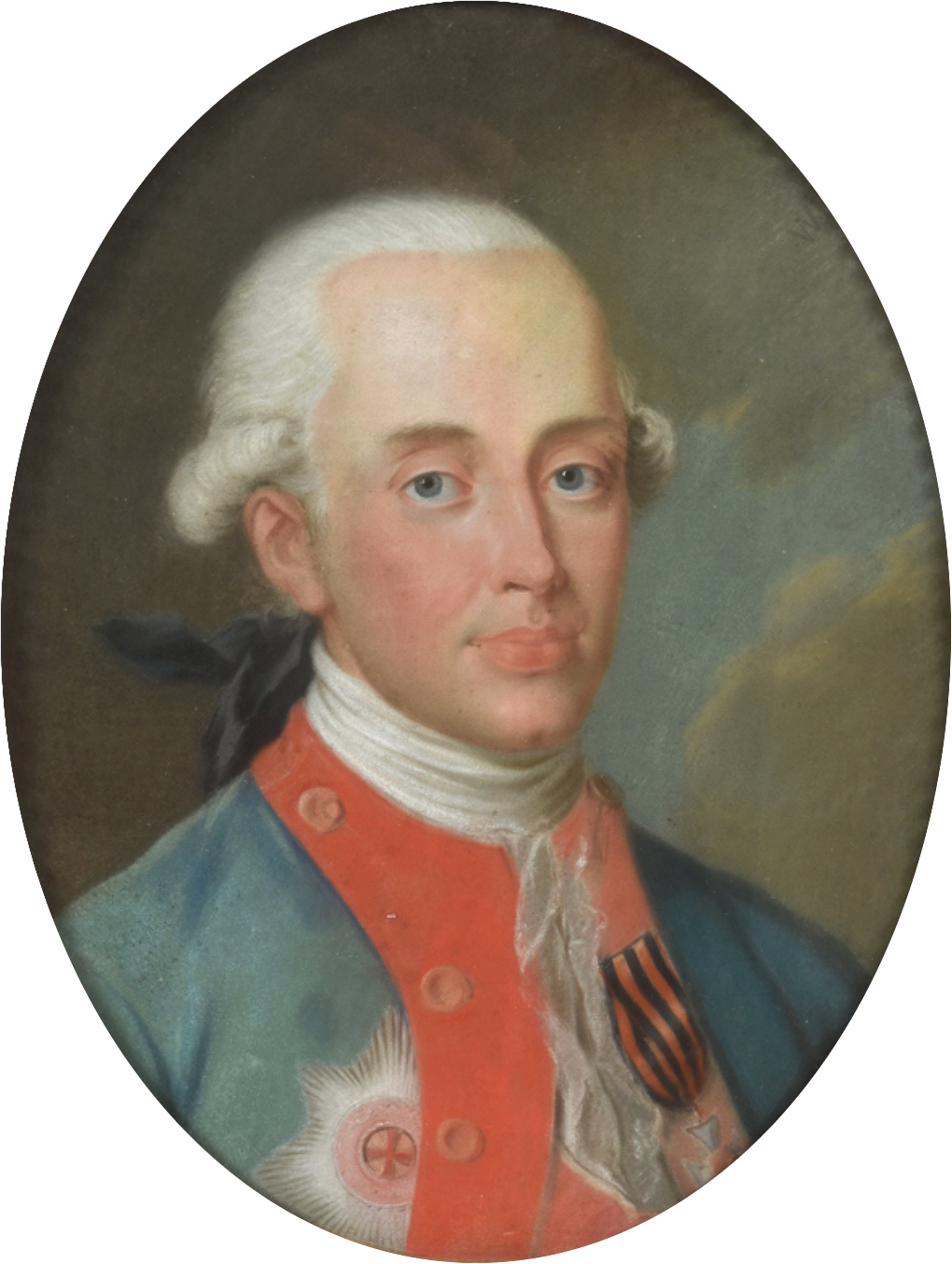
Russian acting commander, Victor Amadeus of Anhalt-Bernburg, c. 1778

By 29 April, 6,000 men with 21 or 22 cannons were concentrated at Savitaipale for the attack, to be led by prince Victor Amadeus of Anhalt-Bernburg. The overall plan called for a two-pronged attack on Partakoski with flanking columns, while a middle column frontally engages Kärnäkoski. Support troops would tie up Armfelt's reserve at Suomenniemi. Some 300 Cossacks were divided between the columns.

Right column: Brigadier General Baikov had six or more cannons and about 2,000 men, (Note: Estimates of Baikov's strength ranges from over 1,000 men by Karhula, to between 2,000 and 3,000 men by Ulfhielm. Aside from the regimental guns, Baikov had one howitzer, and one 12- and four 8-pounder cannons (Armfelt and Jägerhorn), or four 8-pounder licornes and two 3-pounder cannons (Sytin's Military Encyclopedia). According to Armfelt, Igelström followed this column, while Jägerhorn claims that Igelström led the middle column.) in two Preobrazhensky Life Guard battalions and, possibly, a few additional jäger and grenadier detachments. He would march from Suppala over the Saimaa lake, bypass Vegesack's left flank and proceed to capture the heights north of Partakoski.

Middle column: General Major Suchtelen had at least six cannons and 2,000 men, (Note: Suchtelen's strength is estimated at 2,000 men by Karhula, between 2,000 to 3,000 men by Ulfhielm, and more than 3,000 by Jägerhorn (including a Life Grenadier battalion). Aside from 35 jägers, two 12-pounder licornes, and one 12- and three 3-pounder cannons, Sytin's Military Encyclopedia mention six Velikolutski- and seven Yelets companies. According to Armfelt, the two regiments had eight and three companies, respectively, while the number of cannons was similar to the right column. Karhula mentions 14 cannons at his disposal, of which two were howitzers, four 6- and eight 3-pounders.) in several Yelets and Velikolutski companies and, possibly, two or more grenadier companies. Accompanied by Victor Amadeus, he would march along the main road from Savitaipale and frontally engage Vegesack's troops behind the Kärnäkoski strait.

Left columns: Prince Meshchersky led an advance column of two regimental guns and five Yelets companies (up to 1,000 men), (Note: According to Armfelt, the left Russian column – no commander is mentioned – had two regimental guns and 1,000 men of the Yelets regiment, with its remaining 600 men marching in the middle column. While no number or composition is given for Meshchersky's force, Sudravsky refers to it as a detachment sent from the middle [Suchtelen's] column.) to bypass Vegesack's right flank over the Kuolimo, to his southwest. Once on land, he would pave the way for the rear column under Major General Berchmann for a joint attack on the Patterinmäki redoubt. Berchmann, with four cannons and two Life Grenadier battalions (about 1,000 men), (Note: In Karhula and Ulfhielm's description of events, it was Berchmann who led the left column against the Patterinmäki redoubt, while Meshchersky is not mentioned. Furthermore, Karhula puts its strength at two cannons and 1,000 men, in two Life Grenadier battalions – a composition similar to Berchmann's reserve force that remained on the Kuolimo, as per Sudravsky and Sytin's Military Encyclopedia.) would also demonstrate against Suomenniemi to tie up the Swedish reserve. Two grenadier companies were to remain at Savitaipale to guard the army's supply train.

== Battle ==
Before midnight of 30 April, the Russian columns set off for their respective destinations; the lakes and wider sections of the straits were still frozen, while the rapid at the Kärnäkoski bridge was ice free. Jägerhorn received reports after midnight of noise coming from the lakes in several directions. At 02:00, the Ratasalo picket informed him of a Russian advance over the Kuolimo. Half an hour later, he spotted their right column on his opposite side, crossing the Saimaa to the east.

=== Partakoski ===
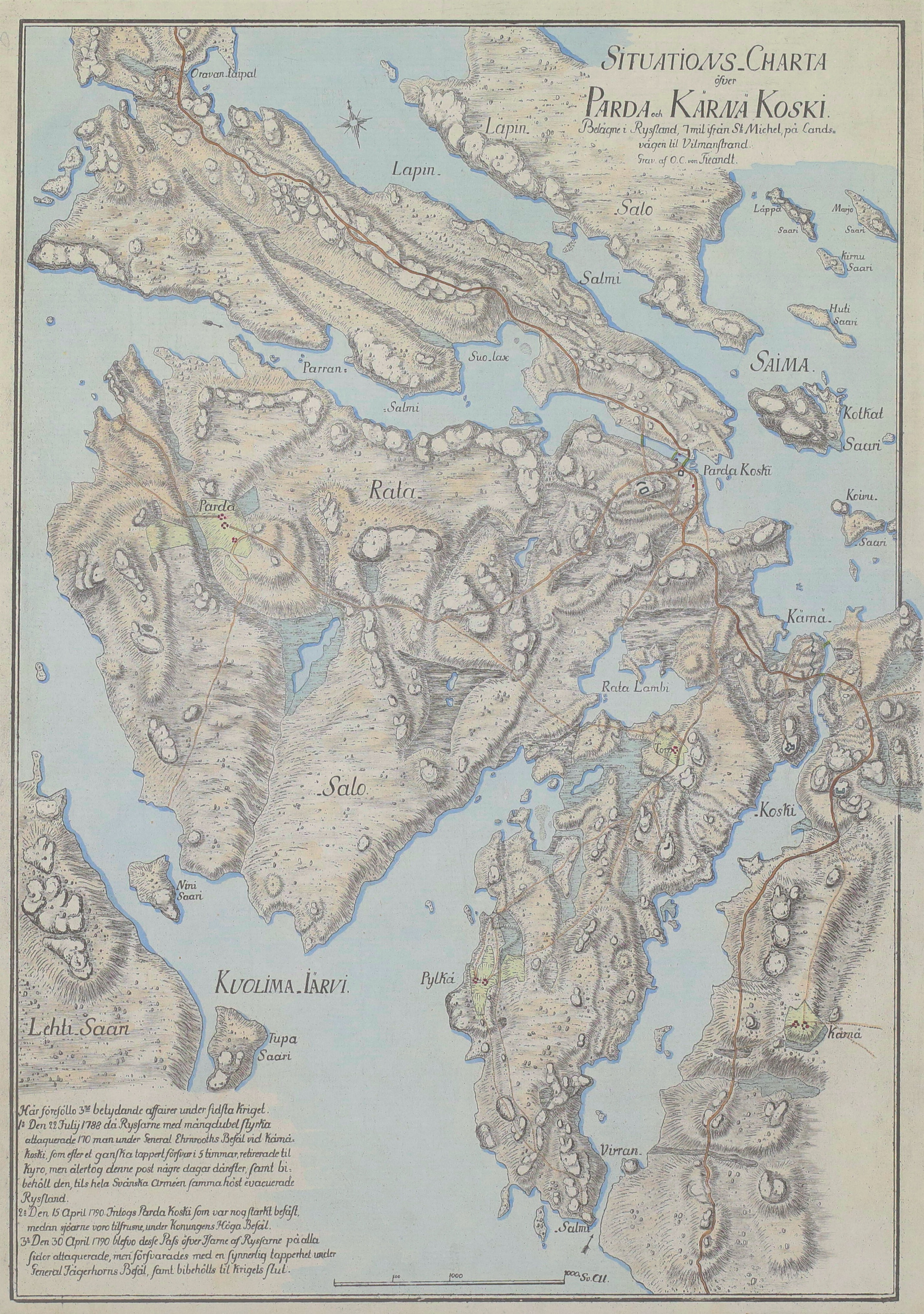
Map over Partakoski and Kärnäkoski during the Russo-Swedish War of 1788–1790

As the right column under Baikov deployed for battle behind the Lapinsalo and Kotkatsaari islands, the Swedes opened fire with two cannons from the shore above Partakoski. Baikov positioned his artillery and jägers on the heights at Kotkatsaari and sent a detachment to attack under their cover, which was repulsed. The Russians quickly achieved fire superiority, however, killing or wounding both of the Värmland commanding officers and many privates. The two Swedish battalions fled towards the Partakoski strait behind them, whereupon Baikov commenced a full attack.

Jägerhorn managed to restore order in his troops and initiated a counterattack, supported by an additional cannon. With the cover of a ridge, the Swedes repelled the Russians as they advanced ashore. The Savolaxers now also appeared on the ice from Kuivainen, forcing Baikov to leave a battalion in his rear before continuing the attack. Most Russian senior commanders were lost in the ensuing struggle, including the mortally wounded Baikov. Too exhausted to attack anew, the Russians withdrew to Kotkatsaari, whence they maintained a steady fire until withdrawing some time past 05:00. (Note: Jägerhorn attests that Baikov's column withdrew soon after the arrival of the Savolax battalion; according to Armfelt, it arrived about an hour after the Jönköpingers. Mankel estimates that the Jönköping and Savolax battalions arrived at Partakoski between 04:00 and 05:00, but that Baikov's column withdrew no sooner than 08:00. Nordensvan puts its retreat to around 05:00.)

During this time, Meshchersky's column crossed the Kuolimo and moved inland towards Parranniemi, west of Partakoski, forcing the Swedish picket back. Hampered by inadequate guides and difficult roads, it did not arrive in front of the Patterinmäki redoubt until around 04:00; Baikov's attack had already failed by then, while the Jönköping and Savolax battalions were arriving at Partakoski from the north. Seeing this, the Russians halted at a distance, deployed two cannons and opened fire. The Swedes, losing but a few horses as a result, replied with their own artillery from the redoubt. Jägerhorn sent forward patrols to observe the Russians.

=== Kuolimo ===
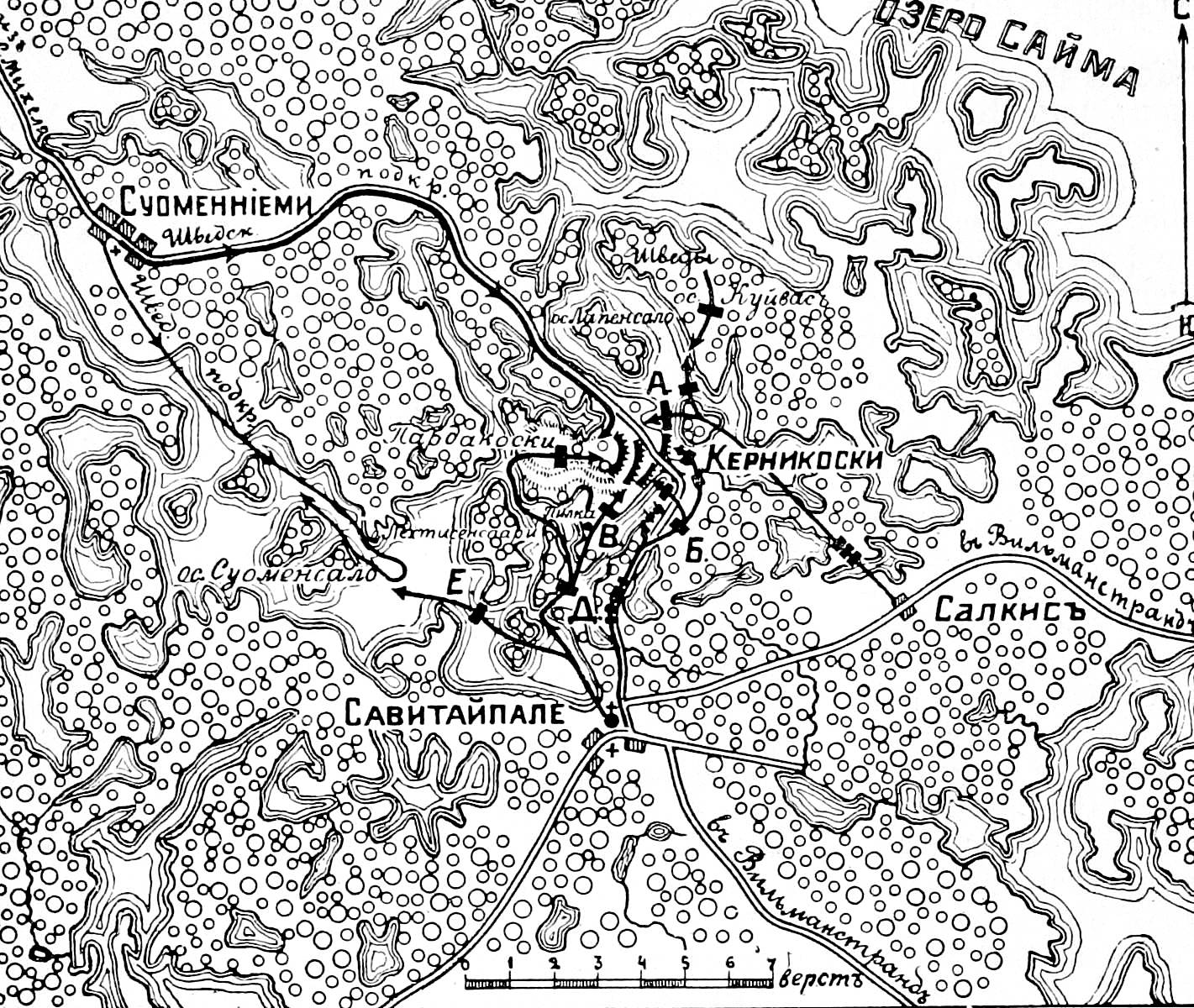
Swedish and Russian troop movements in the battle

Just before 02:00, whilst crossing the Kuolimo, the left Russian columns were spotted by the Swedish picket at Ratasalo. Berchmann dislodged them with two grenadier companies under Second Major Yershov, who proceeded to attack Vegesack's force near Kärnäkoski. Berchmann sent Baron Frensdorf to Suomensalo with two companies and a cannon to screen against Suomenniemi. Four companies and three cannons remained under him between Lehtisensaari and the mainland, in coordination with Meshchersky's advance upon Partakoski.

After being informed of a Swedish advance over the ice from Suomenniemi, Berchmann marched to Frensdorf's support with two companies and as many cannons. Armfelt, however, soon realised it was just a demonstration and pulled back his forces. He directed the Närke-Värmland battalion to Partakoski, which was under heavy attack, while leaving Lieutenant Colonel Gripenberg at Suomenniemi with the Tavastehus battalion and five cannons. The two sides would remain passive at this section for the rest of the battle.

=== Kärnäkoski ===
Suchtelen's middle column arrived opposite the Kärnäkoski breastwork around 04:00, launching a diversionary attack with jägers and two cannons. His main force engaged Vegesack's reserves across the strait, whose fire checked the initial attack. Around 05:00, two grenadier companies under Yershov arrived from Kuolimo and attacked them in the rear, taking the cannon. Suchtelen launched a simultaneous frontal assault across the ice, whereupon Vegesack's right wing buckled and withdrew. The captured cannon was used against the breastwork, which the Russians proceeded to attack from several directions. (Note: Some sources attest that a Swedish cannon was also captured at the breastwork in front of the bridge. But this garners no support in either Armfelt or Jägerhorn's versions.)

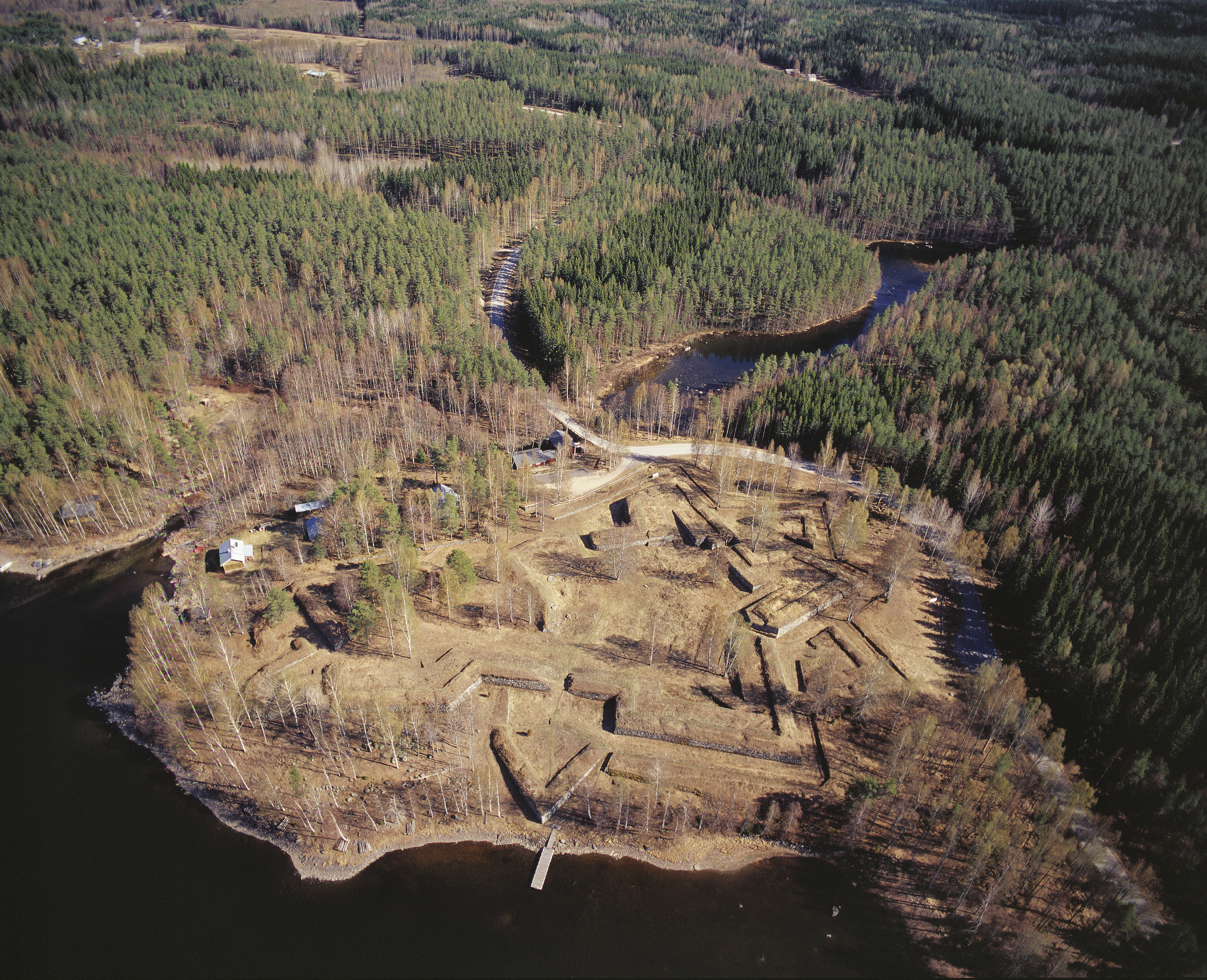
Kärnäkoski Fortress, constructed after the war at the site of the Swedish breastwork

At this moment, a Jönköping division and a Närke-Värmland battalion arrived from Partakoski. Vegesack then rallied the troops for a counterattack on the Russian left flank. Yershov's grenadiers, isolated and outnumbered, were forced to abandon the captured cannon and retire – it would change hands a total of four times in the battle, before the Swedes could finally secure it. Russian attempts to reverse the setback saw Victor Amadeus (Note: In Armfelt's report, Victor Amadeus was mortally wounded as he tried to stop the Swedes from capturing two Russian cannons at the bridge.) being mortally wounded, while their efforts against the breastwork failed. Discouraged, the Russians pulled back, limiting themselves to musket and artillery fire from the opposite bank. Meanwhile, a Swedish cannon arrived from Partakoski with 50 Savolaxers; it demolished a Russian cannon opposite the breastwork and cleared the field of nearby jägers.

=== End of battle ===
Around 08:30, the Russians commenced a general retreat to Savitaipale. Two of their cannons opposite the Kärnäkoski bridge failed to withdraw in time and were lost to a Swedish bayonet charge. The advanced left Russian column did not retreat until 10:00, as the sounds of combat had ceased and the Swedes mustered for a large attack. Berchmann, to whom both Meshchersky and Yershov withdrew, likewise retreated as defeat became apparent. A lack of cavalry prevented the Swedes from effectively pursuing. Armfelt with the battalion from Suomenniemi arrived first after the battle was over.

By their own estimates, the Swedes lost two officers, one non-commissioned officer (NCO), 30 privates and eight waggoners killed; one officer, 14 privates and two waggoners were captured, (Note: According to Jägerhorn, the Swedes had a total of 33 killed, 173 wounded and 18 captured, including three waggoners. Other sources mention a mere 5 captured Swedes. However, Yershov alone is said to have captured a Swedish officer and 14 soldiers. Ulfhielm specifies how one officer, one artillery gunner, four artillerists, five privates and two waggoners were captured as a Swedish cannon was taken.) and six officers, four NCOs and 163 privates and waggoners wounded. Aside from Victor Amadeus and Baikov, who were both mortally wounded, the Russians acknowledged a loss of two cannons, 197 killed and 305 wounded. The Swedes reported to having buried one captain, one adjutant, one Kalmyk, 12 NCOs and 115 Russian privates on the battlefield; one captain, (Note: Captain von Essen was captured, according to whom the Russian force included: Three Imperial Guard battalions (12 companies); three Life Grenadiers companies; eight Velikolutski companies; eight Yelets companies; 300 Cossacks; two howitzers, two 12- and eight 8-pounder cannons, not counting the regimental guns of which there were two on every regiment.) one trumpeter, four NCOs and 90 Russian privates were captured. Other sources speak of 222 Swedish and 700 Russian casualties. In Russian historiography, the failure is attributed to a lack of intelligence, poor guides, failed coordination, and delayed columns, allowing them to be defeated in detail.

== Aftermath ==
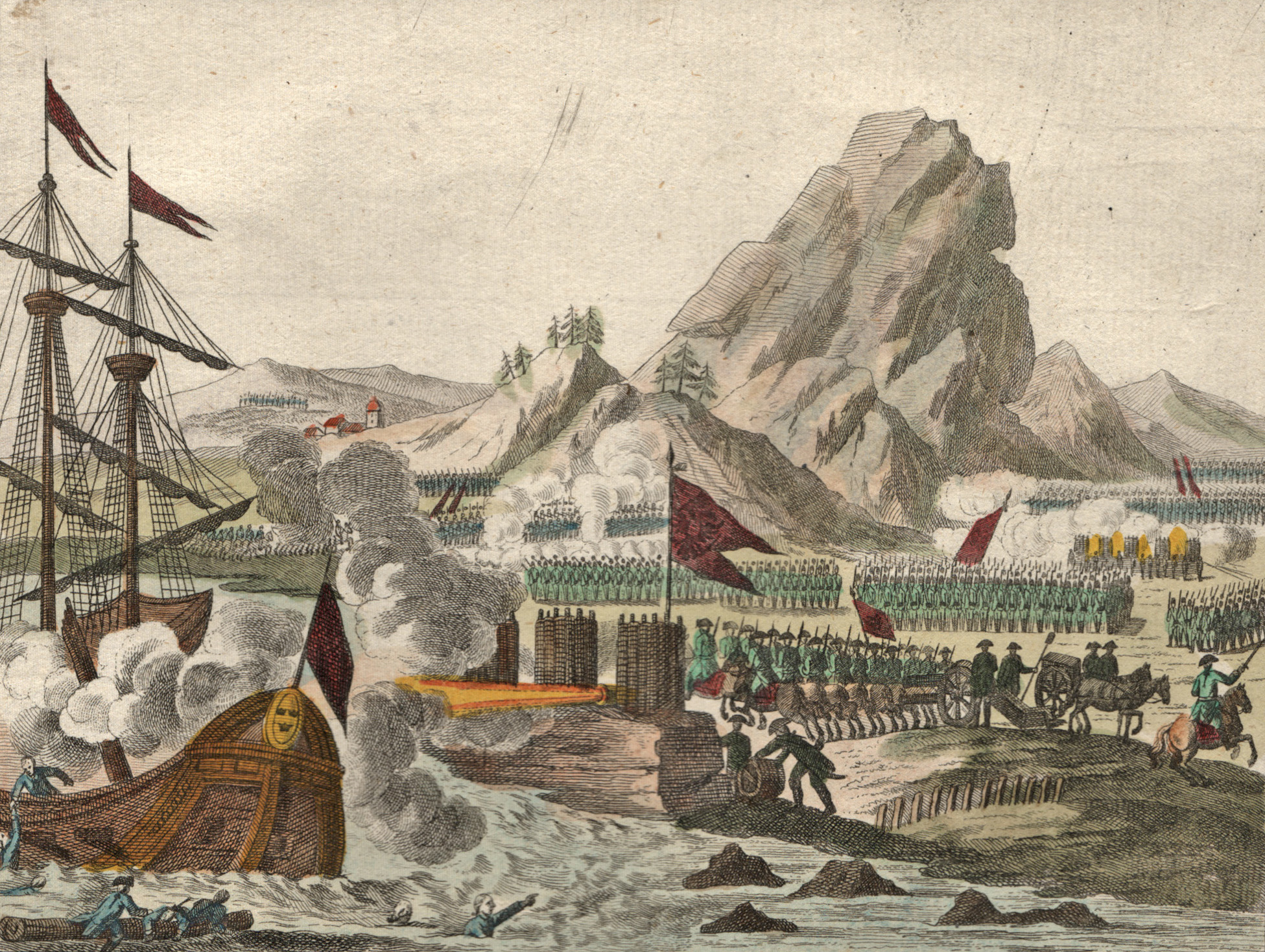
Historical illustration of Armfelt's failed attack on Savitaipale on 4 June

News of the defeat, which Catherine II received from Igelström, deeply saddened the Russian Empress. However, due to a lack of provisions and draught horses, the northern Swedish brigades failed to exploit the success. Instead, Gustav III went over the Kymijoki in the south, to attack Lappeenranta in conjunction with Armfelt's brigade. On 29 April, he defeated the Russians at Valkeala, who then redirected all their forces from Savitaipale but 2,000 men to check him. On 5 May, a Russian counteroffensive over Anjala exposed the Swedish king's right flank, forcing him back over the river. Armfelt attacked Savitaipale on 4 June with three columns of 1,800 men, to pull Russian forces from Hamina and ease the naval operations. Similar to Igelström's failed assault a month earlier, the attacking columns were beaten piecemeal with heavy Swedish losses as a result.

Gustav III's grand naval offensive saw the Swedes getting trapped in the Vyborg Bay; only a costly break out on 3 July prevented their annihilation. The pursuing Russian fleet was in turn shattered at Svenskund on 10 July. The recent setbacks encouraged both nations' rulers to settle for status quo ante bellum in the Treaty of Värälä, on 14 August 1790. Partakoski and Kärnäkoski remained in Swedish hands until the end of the war, after which they were restored to Russia. In 1791, extensive work began under Alexander Suvorov as part of Saint Petersburg's South-Eastern Finland defence system. This resulted in the Kärnäkoski Fortress, completed by 1793, to guard the road to Savitaipale and Lappeenranta.

== Sources ==
=== Works cited ===
- Armfelt, Gustaf Mauritz (May 13, 1790a). "Inrikes Tidningar 1790-05-13" [Domestic Newspapers 1790-05-13]. Post- och Inrikes Tidningar (in Swedish). Vol. 37. Stockholm: Mathias Benzelstierna.
- Armfelt, Gustaf Mauritz (May 20, 1790b). "Dagligt Allehanda 1790-05-20" [Daily Miscellaneous 1790-05-20]. Dagligt Allehanda (in Swedish). Vol. 114. Stockholm: Johan Pfeiffer.
- Bain, Robert Nisbet (1894). Gustavus III and his contemporaries 1742–1792: An overlooked chapter of eighteenth century history. Vol. 2. London: Kegan Paul, Trench, Trübner, & Co. Limited. OCLC 1181760081.
- Ericson, Lars; Glete, Jan (1992). Artéus, Gunnar (ed.). Gustav III:s ryska krig [Gustav III's Russian war] (in Swedish). Stockholm: Probus. ISBN 91-87184-09-5.
- Jägerhorn, Georg Henrik (2004). Hakala, Petra; Hakala, Pertti (eds.). I fält för Gustaf III: Beskrivning över kampanjen i Savolax 1788–1790 [Field service for Gustav III: Description of the campaign in Savolax 1788–1790] (in Swedish). Helsingfors: Svenska litteratursällskapet i Finland. ISBN 951-583-097-4.
- Karhula, Urho (1963). Heinonen, Jorma (ed.). Parta- ja Kärnäkosken taistelut v. 1788–90 sodassa [The battles of Parta- and Kärnäkoski in the war of 1788–90]. Etelä-Karjala : vuosikirja (in Finnish). Lappeenranta: Etelä-Karjalan maakuntaliitto.
- Mankell, Julius (1870). Anteckningar rörande finska arméens och Finlands krigshistoria. Särskildt med afseende på krigen emellan Sverige och Ryssland 1788–1790 samt 1808–1809 [Notes on the military history of the Finnish army and Finland. Especially with regard to the wars between Sweden and Russia in 1788–1790 and 1808–1809] (in Swedish). Vol. 1. Stockholm: P. A. Norstedt & söner. OCLC 1146546770.
- Metsähallitus. "History of the Kärnäkoski Fortress". Luontoon. Metsähallitus. Archived from the original on May 26, 2026.
- Nordensvan, Carl Otto (1904). Värmlands regementes (Närkes och Värmlands reg:tes) historia [Värmland regiment's (Närke and Värmland regiments) history] (in Swedish). Vol. 1. Stockholm: P. A. Norstedt & söner. OCLC 872500478.
- Pihlström, Anton (1911). Kungl. Dalregementet under gustavianska tiden och revolutionskrigen 1772–1815 [The Royal Dalarna Regiment during the times of Gustav III and the Wars of revolution 1772–1815]. Kungl. Dalregementets historia (in Swedish). Vol. 5. Stockholm: Carl Westerlund. OCLC 872500495.
- Schantz, Gustaf von (1818). Historia öfver kriget emellan Sverige och Ryssland. Åren 1788, 1789 och 1790 [History of the war between Sweden and Russia in the years of 1788, 1789 and 1790] (in Swedish). Vol. 2. Stockholm: K. W. O. OCLC 503855067.
- Sudravsky, Vladimir Ksaverievich (1906). История Лейб-Гвардии Гренадерского полка. 1756-1906 [History of the Life Guards Grenadier Regiment. 1756-1906] (in Russian). Vol. 1. Saint Petersburg: Golike and Wilborg.
- Tegnér, Elof (1883). Gustaf Mauritz Armfelt: studier ur Armfelts efterlemnade papper samt andra handskrifna och tryckta källor [Gustaf Mauritz Armfelt: studies from Armfelt's papers as well as other handwritten and printed sources] (in Swedish). Vol. 1. Stockholm: F. & G. Beijers förlag. OCLC 874769022.
- Ulfhielm, Hans (1994). "Artilleriet i krigen" [The artillery in the wars]. In Claëson, Sten (ed.). Kungl. Artilleriet: Frihetstiden och Gustav III:s tid [The Royal Artillery: The Age of Liberty and Gustav III's time] (in Swedish). Bohus: Militärhistoriska förlaget. ISBN 91-85266-56-6.
- Velichko, Konstantin; Novitsky, Vasily; Schwarz, Aleksey von; Apushkin, Vladimir; Schulz, Gustav von (1913). Военная энциклопедия Сытина [Sytin's Military Encyclopedia] (in Russian). Vol. 12. Saint Petersburg: Ivan Sytin. OCLC 700396144.
