= Carl Pontus Gahn =

Swedish military officer

Major general Carl Pontus Gahn
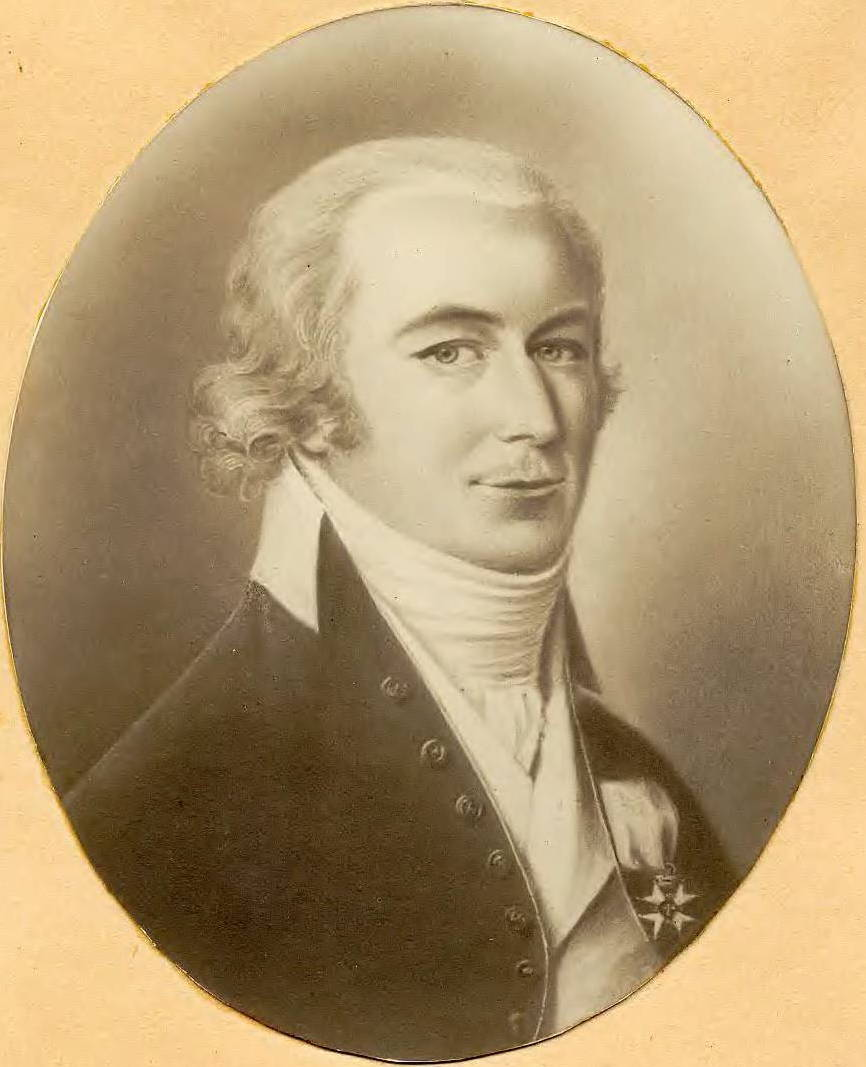
- Born: Carl Pontus Gahn; 1 March 1759; Falun, Sweden
- Died: 9 May 1825 (aged 66); Stockholm, Sweden
- Military career
- Allegiance: Sweden
- Branch: Swedish Army
- Rank: Major general
- Conflicts: Anglo-French War (1778–1783); Siege of Gibraltar; Siege of Port Mahón; Russo-Swedish War (1788–1790); Battle of Parkumäki; Battle of Partakoski (WIA); Battle of Savitaipale; Dano-Swedish War (1808–1809); Battle of Trangen (POW); Swedish–Norwegian War; Battle of Lier; Battle of Matrand
- Other work: President of the Court-Martial of Appeal

Carl Pontus Gahn (1 March 1759 – 9 May 1825) was a Swedish military officer who participated in the Russo-Swedish War in Finland in 1788–1789, the Finnish War campaign in Norway in 1808 and the unsuccessful invasion of Norway at Eidskog in 1814. He was ennobled in 1809, taking the title Gahn af Colquhoun in acknowledgement of his Scottish ancestry (Gahn was itself a contraction via Cahun of the family name of Colquhoun). He was promoted to the rank of Major General in 1814 and became president of the Court-Martial of Appeal in 1824.
