= Battle of Uransari =

- Part of the Russo-Swedish War (1788–1790)
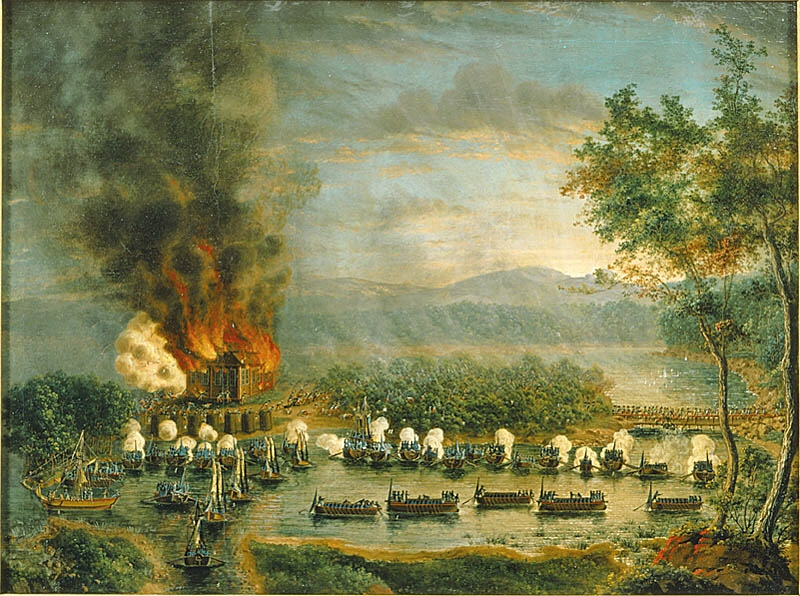
- "Slaget vid Uransari den 16 juni 1790" by Johan Tietrich Schoultz
Date	June 16, 1790
Location	Vysotsk, Russia
Result	Swedish victory

Belligerents
Sweden	(Russia) Russian Empire

Commanders and leaders
Gustav III of Sweden, William Sidney Smith	Unknown

Strength
1 command-yacht, 4 gun longboats, 38 gun sloops and yawls, 200 men in 4 landing crafts	700 men with a coastal battery

Casualties and losses
4 killed, 18 wounded	80–90 killed and captured

The Battle of Uransari or the Battle of Kachis Capel took place on June 16, 1790 during the Russo-Swedish War (1788–1790).

== Background ==
The battle was part of a larger Swedish military operation aiming to destroy the Russian Baltic Fleet, anchored deeper into the Vyborg Bay, at Vysotsk (north of the Uransari island). For this task, Gustav III of Sweden ordered three divisions of the Swedish Navy and Archipelago fleet to penetrate the narrow passages, which were guarded by Russian coastal batteries. William Sidney Smith, an Englishman, commanded the right Swedish division which encountered a battery at the edge of the Uransari island, called Kachis Capel.

== Battle ==
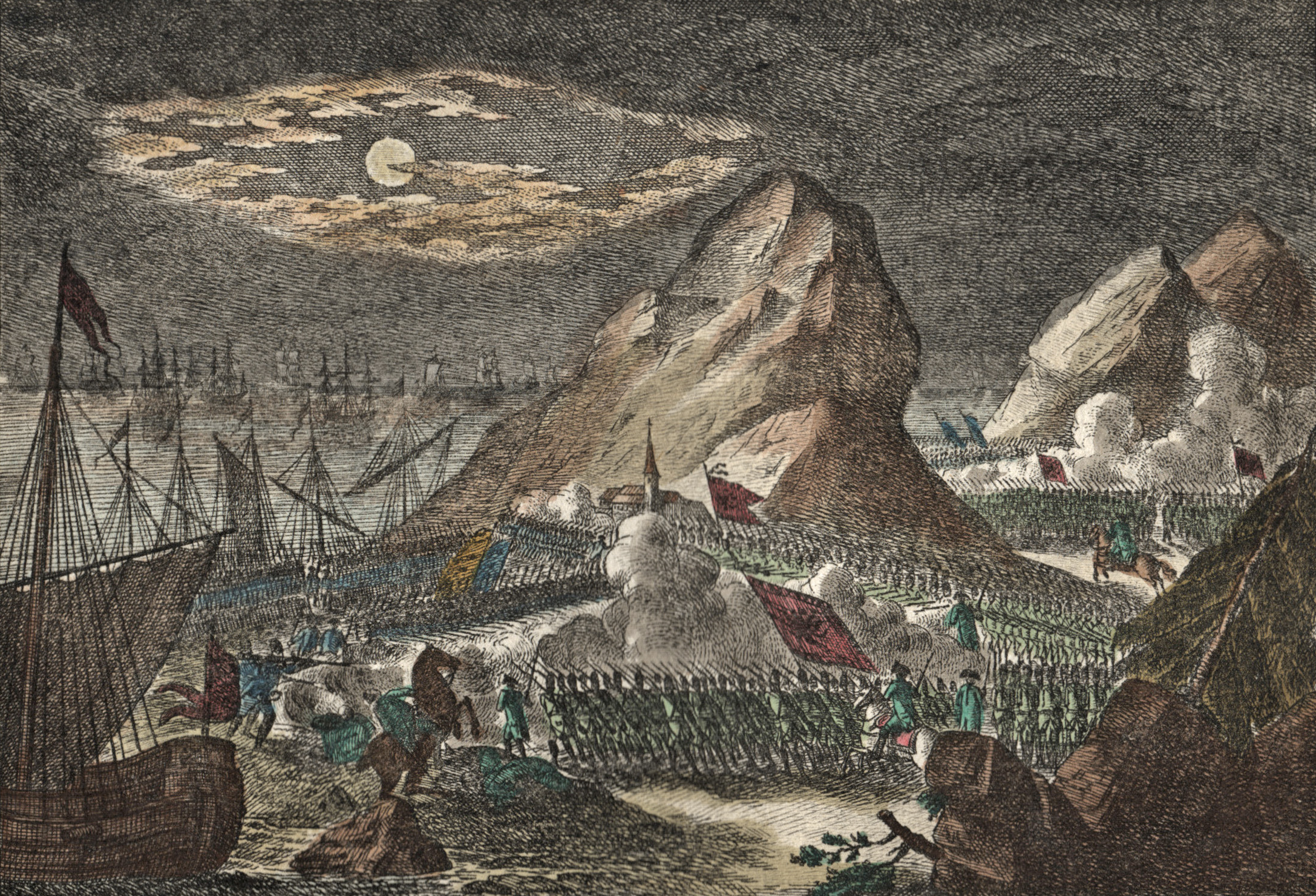
Battle of Uransari, as depicted in Nordischer Kriegsschauplaz

The Swedish forces consisted of the yacht Aurora, four gun longboats, 38 gun sloops and yawls, and 160-200 men of the Svea Life Guards loaded into four landing crafts; all in all close to, or around, 2,000 men. The Russians had a coastal battery and about 700 men (the number was given to the Swedes by captured Russian grenadiers) in the vicinity; among them the Russian Imperial Guards. After about an hour of artillery duel the Russian coastal battery exploded, by which time the Swedish guards landed on the island. After a short struggle the Russian guards retreated, with a loss of four men killed and 26-28 captured. A further 55 Russians fell at the battery itself. The Swedish guards lost fifteen dead and wounded in the action, while the fleet lost seven; in total, four men dead and eighteen wounded. The battle had no strategic effect as the other Swedish divisions had not sailed out accordingly due to bad weather, and Smith, being unsupported, was soon driven off the island by the Russians.

== Aftermath ==
The operation was later cancelled all together by the Swedish king in preparation to break out the Russian blockage. Some days later the Russians made an unsuccessful attempt at destroying the Swedish Archipelago fleet in the Battle of Björkösund. The Swedes managed to break out and escape at the Battle of Vyborg Bay the day after, but with heavy losses. The two sides then faced each other in the decisive Battle of Svensksund, which marked the ending of the war.
