= Gahn =

Gahn is a Swedish family from Falun, one member of which was ennobled in 1809 with the name Gahn af Colquhoun. The family has claimed an unverified origin in a Scottish family Colquhoun, a claim which was confirmed 1781 in a letter by the Lord Lyon King of Arms, but on dubious grounds, as later research has shown. A claim that the Swedish noble family Canonhielm is a branch of this family has also been shown to lack genealogical substance.

Notable members of the family include:

- Johan Gottlieb Gahn (1745–1818), chemist and mineralogist who discovered manganese in 1774, and after whom the mineral gahnite was named.
- Henrik Gahn (1747–1816), physician and student of Linnaeus, who pioneered the use of vaccine against smallpox in Sweden in 1803.
- Carl Pontus Gahn, ennobled with the name Gahn af Colquhoun (1759–1825), military officer who participated in the war in Finland in 1788–1789, the campaign in Norway in 1808 and the invasion of Norway in 1814. He became major-general in 1814 and president of the Court-Martial of Appeal in 1824.
- Henrik Gahn (1820–1874), chemist and industrialist, who invented the first antiseptics to be used in Sweden, which he named aseptin and amykos. In 1867 he founded the company Henrik Gahns AB, sold in 1964 to Barnängen (the latter was bought and is now a brand owned by Henkel Norden AB). The brand Gahns was sold to a different company and is still used for hygiene products in Sweden and the other Nordic countries.
- Henrik Gahn (1820–1901), industrialist and politician, member of the Burghers' Estate of the Swedish parliament 1856–1866, and of the First Chamber of the new two-chamber parliament 1874–1892.
- Wolter Gahn (1890–1985), architect, modernist pioneer and co-author of the Swedish modernist manifesto acceptera ("accept!", intentionally with a lowercase initial, 1931). He was one of the two men behind the new Government Chancery building (Kanslihuset) in Stockholm, completed in 1936, but designed earlier and in a classical style adapted to the context of the Stockholm Old Town.
