= Iosif Igelström =

Russian general (1737–1823)

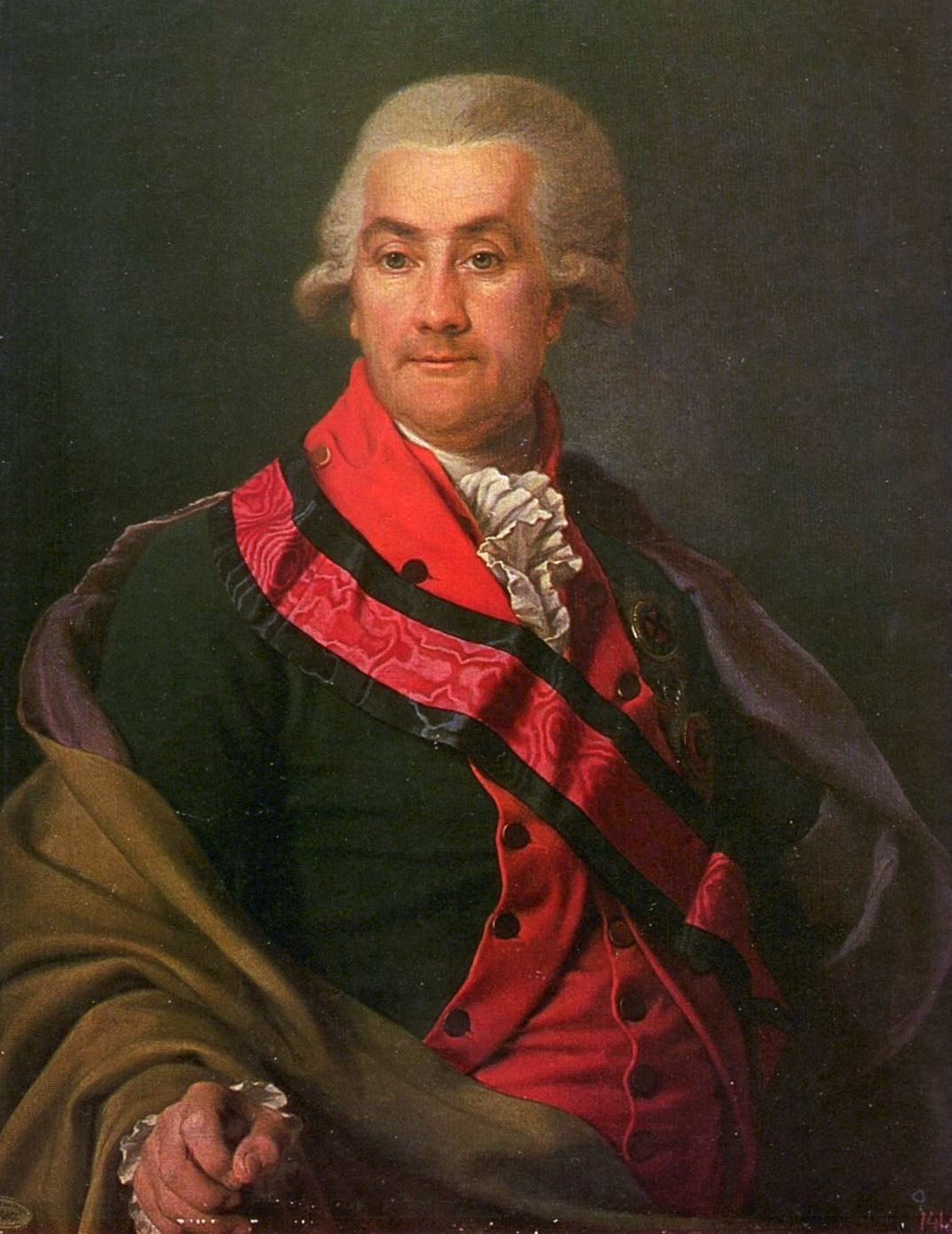
Portrait of General Igelström by Dmitry Levitzky, c. 1780s – c. 1790s

Count Otto Heinrich Igelström (Swedish: Otto Henrik Igelström; Russian: Иосиф Андреевич Игельстром, romanized: Iosif Andreyevich Igelstrom; 7 May 1737 – 18 February 1823) was a Russian general from the noble Swedish family of Igelström, best known for his services during the Catherinian reign. His significant military victory was the siege of the Akkerman fortress in 1770. During the Warsaw Uprising of 1794 Igelström lost control of his eventually defeated forces.

== Life ==
Otto Heinrich Igelström, son of Landmarschall (Country Marshal) in the Governorate of Livonia Freiherr Gustaf Henrik Igelström and Margarethe Elisabeth von Albedyll, was born on 7 May 1737 in Gargždai (now Lithuania). He was educated in Riga and Germany.

In 1753, Otto entered military service in Russia, participated in the Russo-Turkish War of 1768–1774, having taken Akkerman. In 1773, he participated in the failed siege of Silistra. In 1777, he became lord of Unipiha manor (German: Unnipicht) and in 1781, lord of Meeri manor (German: Meyershof) in Livonia (now in Nõo Parish, Estonia). In 1784, he commanded Russian troops in Crimea and took the last Crimean khan Şahin Giray prisoner. He participated in Russo-Swedish War of 1788–1790 and was involved in a botched battle of Partakoski of 30 April 1790 initiated by Ivan Saltykov. Igelström was empowered to sign the Treaty of Värälä on behalf of Russian Empire in 1790. After that, he was the general en chef and commander of the Finland Corps. In 1784 to 1792, Otto was the governor-general of Siberia and Ufa governorates. In 1792, he was granted Russian nobility title and was made the governor-general of Pskov Governorate. In 1793, he took the same position of the Kiev and Chernigov governorates.

In 1794, Otto was appointed ambassador to Warsaw and the commander of Russian troops in Poland–Lithuania. For his failure in suppressing the Warsaw Uprising of 1794 he was demoted. He was infantry general since 1796. Paul I of Russia took him into service in the rank of infantry general and appointed the governor-general to Orenburg Governorate in 1797.

== See also ==
- Młodziejowski Palace in Warsaw
- Ambassadors and envoys from Russia to Poland (1763–1794)

== Sources ==
- "Игельстрём, Осип Андреевич" . Brockhaus and Efron Encyclopedic Dictionary (in Russian). 1906.

Political offices
Preceded by Mikhail Krechetnikov	Governor-General of Little Russia; 1793–1794	Succeeded by
