= Siege of Akkerman =

1770 siege in the Russo-Turkish War (1768–74)

- Part of the Russo-Turkish War of 1768–1774
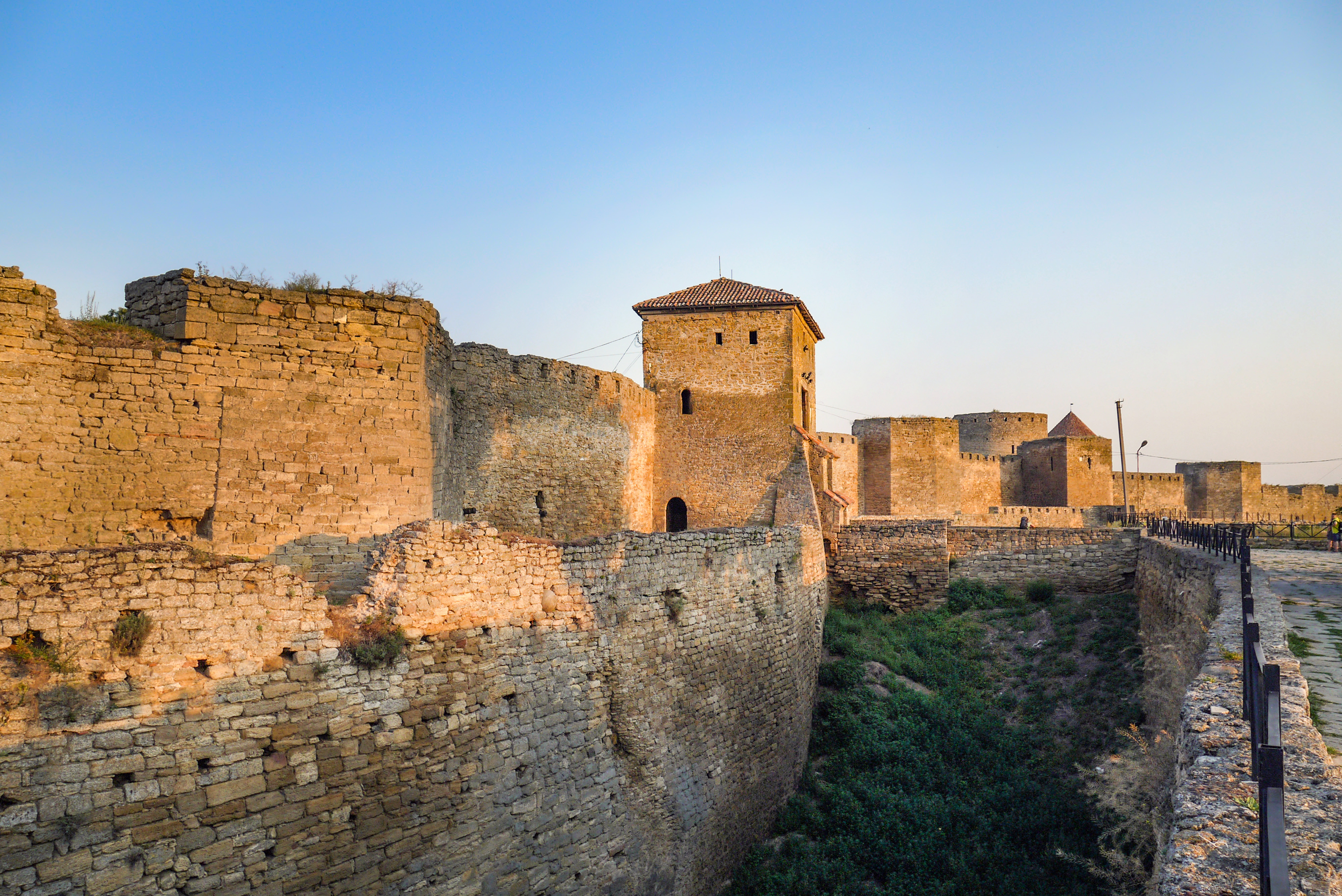
- Akkerman fortress
| Date | September 24 – October 6, 1770 (Note: Sep. 13 – Sep. 25, 1770, — Old Style date) |
| Location | Akkerman, Budjak, Ottoman Empire (now Bilhorod-Dnistrovskyi, Odesa Oblast, Ukraine) 46°12′3.96″N 30°21′2.16″E |
| Result | Russian victory |

Belligerents
| Russian Empire | Ottoman Empire; Crimean Khanate |

Commanders and leaders
| (Russian Empire) Iosif Igelström (Russian Empire) Christopher von Nolcken | (Ottoman Empire) Debeçi-Pasha Aliadr |

Strength
| 4 infantry regiments, 1 hussar squadron, 2,5 Cossack sotnia | Garrison: 1,133 janissaries, (Note: Older data says 1,333.); 4,648 inhabitants Relief: 1,000 Crimean Tatars, 20 vessels (şayka) |

Casualties and losses
| 23 killed, 109 wounded | The garrison capitulated; 65 cannons, 8 mortars, 3 howitzers |

The siege of Akkerman took place in 1770 between 24 September and 6 October.

Brigadier Baron Igelström, dispatched from the corps of Prince Repnin with a detachment (4 infantry regiments, a squadron of hussars, and 2,5 Cossack sotnia) entered on September 24 in the suburb of Akkerman, laid an artillery battery and advanced a post (2 companies, 2 cannons, and 70 men Cossacks) under the command of Captain Nolcken to Dniester Estuary, in order to cut off the besieged from getting communication with Ochakov (Özi/Özü), from where Ottoman reinforcements were expected. On September 26 Nolcken defeated 1,000 Crimeans and forced them to take refuge on an island lying against the Dniester's mouth; at that time Turkish ships headed for Akkerman entered the mouth, but, met by artillery fire of 2 Nolcken's cannons, the ships sailed back towards the sea. Despite the significant fortifications of Akkerman, the fortress' garrison (1,133 janissaries), suppressed by the batteries' fire, on October 6 was forced to surrender the fortress; the Russians got 65 cannons, 8 mortars and 3 howitzers. During the whole time of actions at Akkerman Russia lost 23 killed and 109 wounded men. After removal of Turkish troops and inhabitants to Izmail and occupation of the fortress, Russian troops left Akkerman, leaving in it the garrison of Major Baron Fersen (an infantry regiment and a hundred Cossacks) and went to Fălciu. At the conclusion of the Küçük Kaynarca peace Akkerman was returned to the Turks.

== Notes and references ==
=== Sources ===
- Novitsky, Vasily; Schwartz, Alexey; Apushkin, Vladimir; Schoultz, Gustav (1911). Военная энциклопедия Сытина [Sytin Military Encyclopedia] (in Russian). Vol. 1: А – Алжирия. Moscow: Типография Т-ва И. Д. Сытина. pp. 205–206.
- Seddeler, Loggin (1852). Военный энциклопедический лексикон [Military encyclopedic lexicon] (in Russian). Vol. 1 (2nd ed.). Saint Petersburg: Типография штаба военно-учебных заведений. p. 205.
- Petrov, Andrey (1866). Война России с Турцией и Польскими конфедератами, с 1769—1774 год [Russia's war with Turkey and the Polish confederates] (in Russian). Vol. 2. St. Petersburg: Типография Эдуарда Веймара. pp. 165–169.
