= Kuolimo =

Lake in the country of Finland

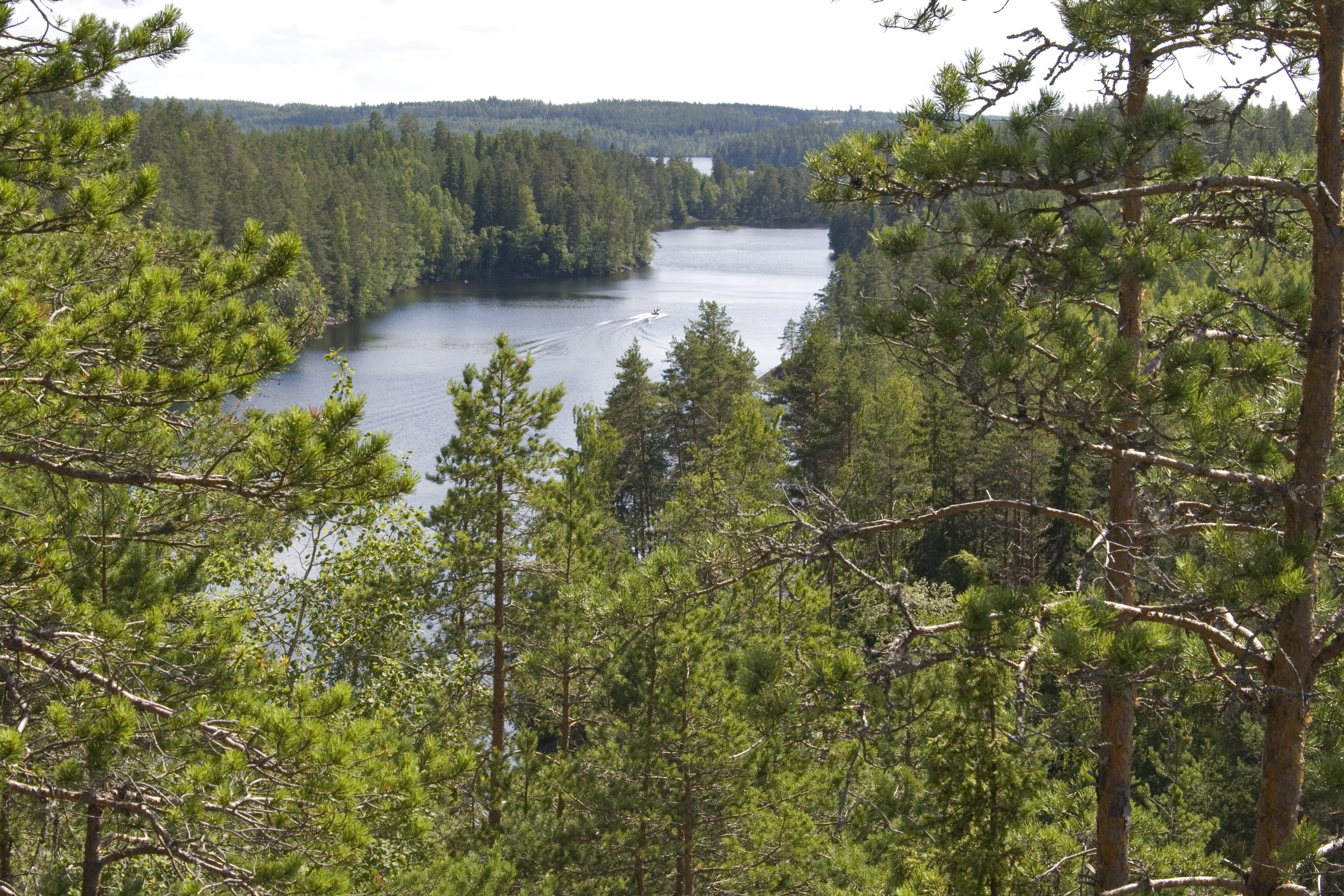

- Location within Finland
- Coordinates: 61°16′N 27°32′E
- Catchment area: 861 km^{2} (332 sq mi)
- Basin countries: Finland
- Surface area: 79 km^{2} (31 sq mi)
- Average depth: 9.8 m (32 ft)
- Max. depth: 41 m (135 ft)
- Water volume: 0.78 km^{3} (0.19 cu mi)
- Shore length^{1}: 395 km (245 mi)
- Surface elevation: 77 m (253 ft)
- Frozen: December-April
- References: Järviwiki Web Service
- ^{1} Shore length is not a well-defined measure.

Kuolimo is a medium-sized lake in south-eastern Finland, in the municipalities of Savitaipale and Suomenniemi.

Lake Kuolimo is closely linked to Finland's largest lake Saimaa, and discharges into it through two separate routes, featuring the rapids of Partakoski and Kärnänkoski. The lakes belong to the Vuoksi river basin, which drains through Lake Ladoga to the Gulf of Finland.

Kuolimo is considered a particularly clean-water lake. It is inhabited by a relict population of the Arctic char. The critically endangered fish lives only certain parts of southern Lake Saimaa, including Yövesi, Luonteri and Ruokovesi. The original population lives only in Lake Kuolimo. Fishing of the Arctic char is totally prohibited.

== See also ==
- List of lakes in Finland
