= Mirza Jafar Topchubashov =

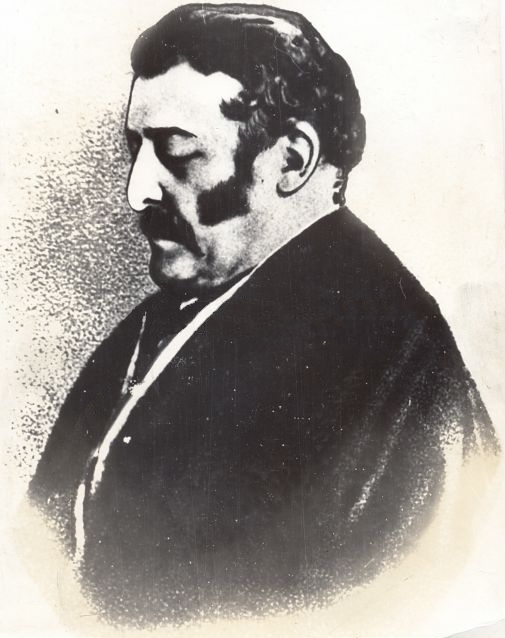
- Born: 1790; Ganja, Ganja Khanate, Iran
- Died: 1869 (aged 78–79); Saint Petersburg, Russian Empire
- Occupation: Orientalist

Mirza Jafar Topchubashov (Russian: Мирза Джафар Топчибашев, Azerbaijani: Mirzə Cəfər Topçubaşov) was a Russian orientalist scholar and poet of Azerbaijani origin. He also worked as privy councillor for sometime alongside teaching Oriental Languages at History-Philology Faculty of Saint Petersburg State University since 1819. He was a member of Royal Asiatic Society, as well as teacher of Aleksander Chodźko, Alexander Griboyedov and Vasili Grigoryev, who would be appointed as Imperial Censor of Russia.

== Biography ==
He was born in 1790 to local minor noble family of Topchubashi. His father Ali-Mardan bek was a secretary and father-in-law of Javad Khan. He grew up in Tbilisi, educated under the guidance of clerics. In addition to his native Azerbaijani language, he was proficient in Persian, Arabic and Turkish, which he studied in the madrasah. He also had a command of Russian, Georgian and Armenian languages.

He was soon recruited as a translator to the Persian embassy with which he arrived in Saint Petersburg in 1817. Not much later he was offered positions as a teacher of Oriental languages at the Main Pedagogical Institute and the Asian department of the Ministry of Foreign Affairs of Russia. After departure of François Bernard Charmoy on 31 December 1835, he was appointed to the post of extraordinary professor in the department of Persian literature.

He was one of the founders of Imperial Russian Archaeological Society in 1846, heading it till February 1855.

He resigned from academic work in 1849, citing health reasons. He was replaced by another Azerbaijani scholar Alexander Kazembek who was transferred from Kazan University. After leaving the university, Mirza Jafar worked in the Asian department of the Ministry of Foreign Affairs for another 18 years. He left work in the Asian department in 1867 due to the complete loss of working capacity. He still was connected to academia, granting scholarship to one of best students every year.

He died on 8 February 1869. The obituary noted that the name of Jafar Topchibashov "will be pronounced with appreciation as long as the existence of St. Petersburg University".

== Awards ==
- Order of Saint Anna 2nd degree with the imperial crown
- Order of Saint Vladimir of the 4th degree (until 1826)
- Order of Saint Vladimir 3rd degree
- Order of Saint Vladimir 2nd degree
- Order of Saint Stanislav 1st degree
- Persian Order of the Lion and the Sun 2nd degree
