= Court-Martial of Appeal (Sweden) =

- Krigshovrätten
- Established: 14 March 1791
- Dissolved: 30 June 1949
- Location: Stockholm, Sweden
- Composition method: Court-martial
- Appeals to: Supreme Military Court
- Appeals from: Regimental court-martial
- Number of positions: 7, later 5 (from 1868)

The Court-Martial of Appeal (Swedish: Krigshovrätten) was a Swedish court. It was the appellate court among military courts and heard cases appealed from regimental courts-martial. The establishment of Sweden's first military appellate court, the Colonel's War Court, occurred through Gustavus Adolphus' Articles of War in 1621. Later, during Queen Christina's reign, this court became a division of the War College. In 1791, the Court-Martial of Appeal was created, initially consisting of at least 7 members, including military officers and a justiciar. Dissolved briefly, it was revived in 1797 and designated as the appellate court during peacetime. Over time, its composition and role evolved, eventually becoming a division of the Svea Court of Appeal in 1916. Finally, with the Military Court Proceedings Act of 1948, military cases in peacetime transitioned to ordinary courts, leading to the abolition of the Court-Martial of Appeal in 1949.

== History ==
Through Gustavus Adolphus' Articles of War of 15 July 1621, a field court-martial, called the Colonel's War Court (Överste Krigsrätt i Fält), was established, which can be regarded as Sweden's first proper military appellate court. This court, which, like the Svea Court of Appeal established in 1614, judged the King's verdicts, had the Lord High Constable as its president and a number of senior military officers as its members. During Queen Christina's reign, the War Court became a division of the War College with the College President, the Lord High Constable, as president, along with 6 military officers and the same number of collegiate assessors as assistants. However, in 1683, by Charles XI, two military appellate courts were established, namely a General War Court (General-Krigsrätt) for the army and an Admiralty Court (Amiralitets-Rätt) for the navy. These courts consisted exclusively of military members.

In 1774, the cases of the General War Court were once again transferred to the War College, where they were handled for 17 years. Then, on 14 March 1791, King in Council's proclamation "regarding a single and general appellate court in Stockholm for the entire King in Council's Armed Forces on land and at sea in Sweden and Finland" came. The new appellate court was called the Court-Martial of Appeal (Krigshovrätt) in the proclamation, a designation encountered here for the first time. On the same day, it received a special procedural order. The King in Council's Court-Martial of Appeal would consist of at least 7 members, including the president, of which 6 would be military officers and one would be a justiciar.

The Court-Martial of Appeal was dissolved a few years later but was revived by a royal proclamation in 1797. In the Articles of War of 1798, it was determined that the Court-Martial of Appeal would serve as the appellate court during peacetime, while during wartime, special appellate courts should be appointed: a General War Court for the land army and superior courts for the navies. The position of justiciar was changed in 1827 to a Lord Justice of Court-Martial of Appeal's (krigshovrättsråd) office.

According to the Royal Ordinance on Military Courts on 11 June 1868, the Court-Martial of Appeal was the second court within the military (§ 2). When ordered by the king, a special Supreme Military Court (Överkrigsrätt) could be established for an army outside the realm or for a fleet on a naval expedition (§ 12), or for both jointly. The Court-Martial of Appeal was composed of four military members appointed by the king for three years, namely a general officer as president and three regimental officers (including at least one with the rank of colonel), as well as a civilian member appointed by the king with the title of Lord Justice of Court-Martial of Appeal. Of the three regimental officers, one was to be from the navy, while the other two were from the army. In addition to being the appellate court for military courts, the Court-Martial of Appeal also immediately handled certain cases, namely those involving crimes committed by officers, and other cases specified by separate legislation for immediate review and judgment by the appellate court.

The public prosecutor at the Court-Martial of Appeal was, according to the law of 1914, the chief public court-martial prosecutor (överkrigsfiskalen). Until then, it was the court-martial prosecutor (krigsfiskalen). In 1916, the military appellate court underwent a profound transformation. Through the military legislation in force from that year until 1949, the military appellate court became a division of the Svea Court of Appeal. Of the previous composition of the military appellate court, the military appellate court judge and two military members, one for the army and one for the navy, were retained. In addition, two hovrättsråd from the Svea Court of Appeal were now included, one serving as the president.

The Military Court Proceedings Act (Militär rättegångslag (1948:472)) of 30 June 1948 stipulated that military cases in peacetime should be handled in ordinary courts. Thus, the Court-Martial of Appeal was abolished. On 30 June 1949, the court held its final session in the plenary hall of the Svea Court of Appeal in the Wrangel Palace.

== Presidents ==
- 1810–1812: Carl Nathanael af Klercker
- 1812–????: Fredrik Tersmeden
- 1816–1820: Georg Carl von Döbeln
- 1824–1825: Carl Pontus Gahn
- 1858–1864: Nils Gyldenstolpe (acting)
- 1864–1871: Magnus Björnstjerna
- 1872–1882: Samuel August Sandels
- 1882–1903: Sven Lagerberg
- 1903–1910: Hemming Gadd
- 1911–1915: Olof Malm
- 1916–1929: Johan Lagerbielke
- 1929–1937: Anders Renström
- 1937–1943: Henric Nordenskjöld
- 1943–1949: Arvid Johansson
