= Anastasia Novitskaya =

Russian ballerina (1790–1822)

Anastasia Novitskaya (1790–1822) was a Russian ballerina. She was engaged at the Imperial Russian Ballet in 1806–1822, where she was a soloist and regarded as an elite member during her career. She was trained by Charles Didelot, and acted as an instructor in dance at the Smolny Institute.
