= Battle of Savitaipale =

Battle of Savitaipal
- Part of the Russo-Swedish War of 1788–1790
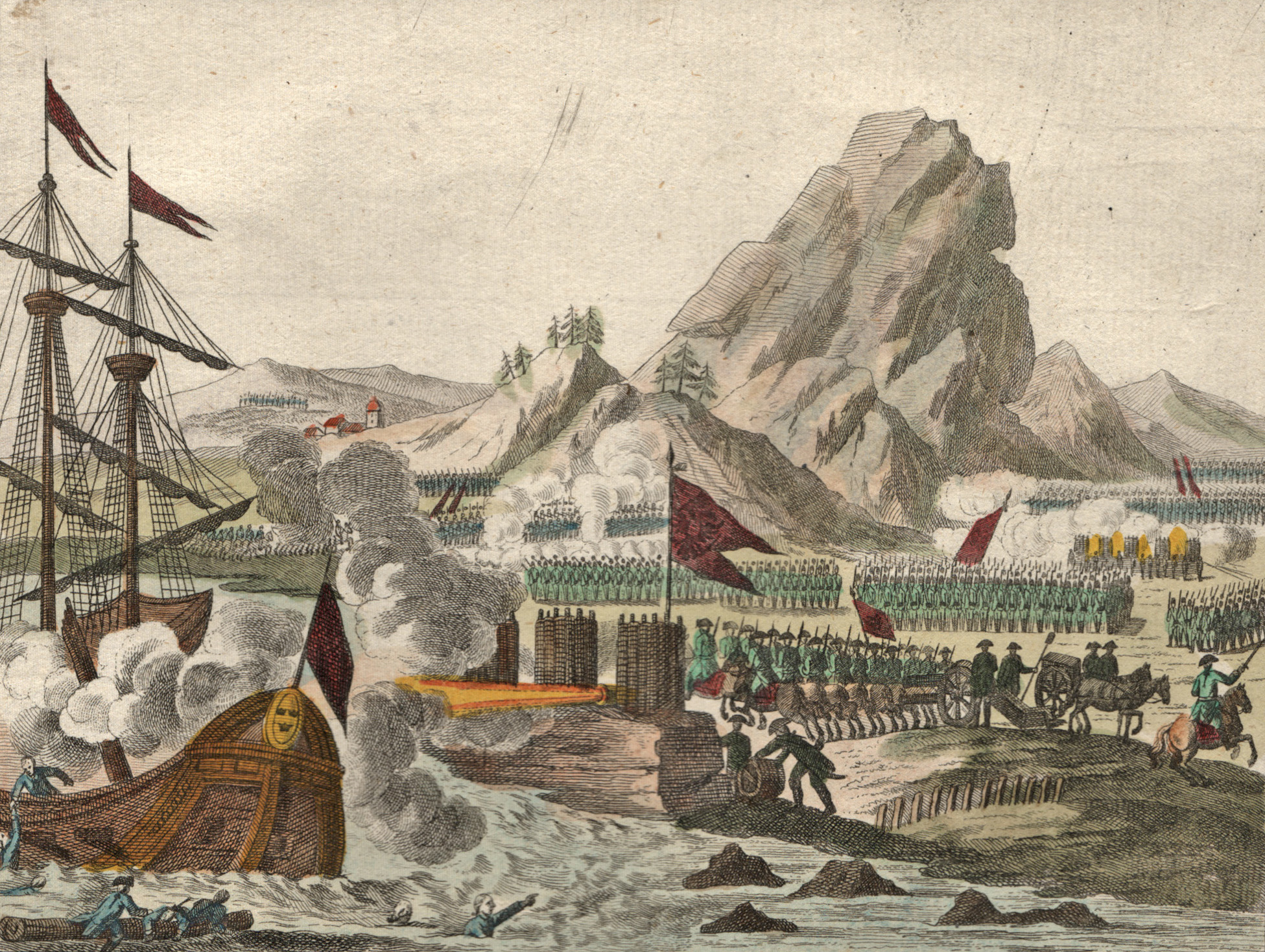
- Battle of Savitaipal, as depicted in Nordischer Kriegsschauplaz
Date	3 June 1790
Location	Savitaipale, now Finland
Result	Russian victory

Belligerents
Sweden	Russian Empire

Commanders and leaders
Gustaf Mauritz Armfelt	(Russian Empire) Alexey Khrushchev

Strength
1,800 (Swedish sources); 4,000 (Russian sources)	1,600 (Russian sources); 3,000 (Swedish sources)

Casualties and losses
372 killed, wounded or captured (Swedish sources); 750 killed, wounded or captured (Russian sources)	60 killed, wounded or captured (Russian sources); 800 killed, wounded or captured (Swedish sources)

The Battle of Savitaipal took place on June 3, 1790 during the Russo-Swedish War (1788–90), between Sweden and the Russian Empire. The Swedes lost the battle and had to withdraw with a loss of 372 men killed, wounded and captured or 750 according to Russian sources. The Russians estimated their casualties at 60 men killed and wounded, whereas the Swedes claimed to have killed 800.
