= Battle of Björkösund =

- Part of the Russo-Swedish War (1788–90)
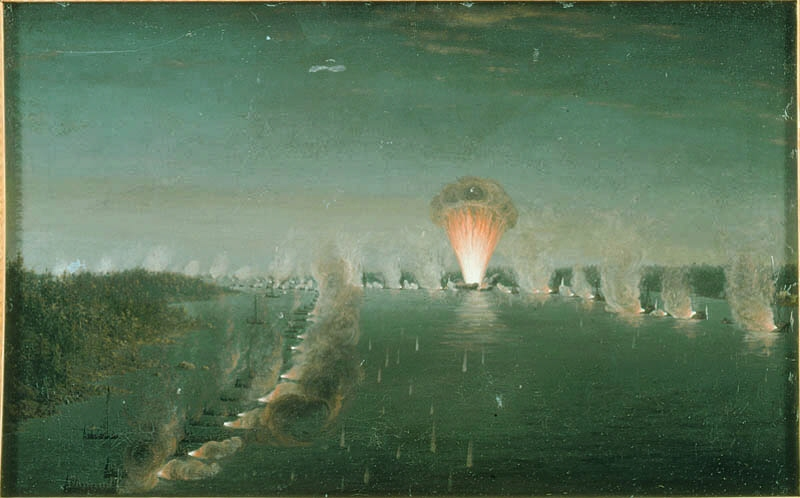
- Affären vid Björksund, 1790 by Johan Tietrich Schoultz
Date	July 2–3, 1790
Location	Beryozovye Islands, Russia
Result	Swedish victory

Belligerents
Sweden	(Russia) Russian Empire

Commanders and leaders
Klas Hjelmstierna	Karl Heinrich von Nassau-Siegen

Strength
42 gun sloops and yawls	7 frigates, 6 xebecs, 3 floating batteries, 3 prams, 5 bomb vessels and 57 smaller ships

Casualties and losses
3 killed, 8 wounded	400 men, 1 frigate, 1 xebec and another larger and some minor ships

The Battle of Björkösund took place on July 2–3, 1790 during Russo-Swedish War (1788–90), between Sweden and the Russian Empire.

== Background ==
The Russians, who had the navy of their Swedish opponents along with their Archipelago fleet trapped inside the Vyborg Bay, planned to attack the Swedish ships from different directions causing a decisive defeat on its navy before the wind would allow them to escape the trap. On the night of July 2–3 the attack was commenced by Karl Heinrich von Nassau-Siegen who, with his coastal fleet of 81 ships of various sizes, sailed to meet with the Swedes stationed at the eastern strait of Björkösund.

== Battle ==
The Swedes with three divisions of mostly gun sloops and yawls under Lieutenant colonel Klas Hjelmstierna with major Leijonankar and captain Scharff assisting in their divisions, had about 42 boats (14 in each division) under their command. The strait beside the island of Kantasari, from which the Russians had to attack through, was narrow and was met with fierce fire at 23:00 on July 2 by the Swedish vessels. The fighting continued until 04:00 on July 3, until the Swedish Lieutenant received orders to fall back to the main Swedish ships as the breakthrough from Vyborg Bay was about to begin. A squadron of Lieutenant colonel Stedingk consisting of turumas was initially left to cover their withdrawal, but as the Russians chose not to pursue, they as well went off to the main Swedish vessels.

== Aftermath ==
In the battle the Swedes lost only 3 killed and another 8 wounded. The Russians, on the other hand lost up to 400 men killed and wounded according to their own numbers provided by captives after the battle of Svensksund (mostly due to the narrow strait they had to attack through), as well as one frigate and one xebec another larger ship was also lost along with some smaller ones. The Swedes were successful in that they managed to hold off the Russian coastal fleet long enough for the preparations for the breakthrough to be set and so, on July 3, Gustav III of Sweden and his navy finally broke out, although with heavy losses.
