= Treaty of Värälä =

1790 peace treaty ending the Russo-Swedish War

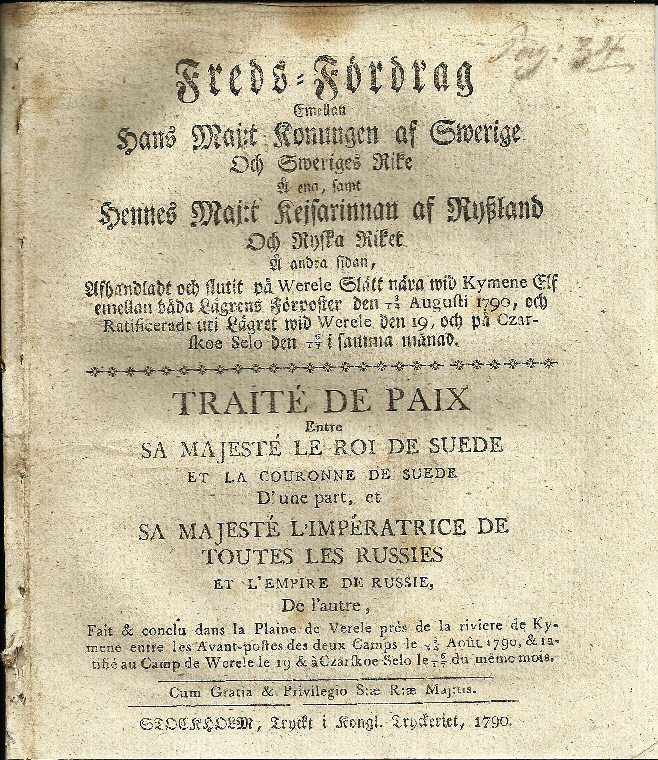
Announcement of the Peace of Värälä

The Treaty of Värälä (sometimes known as the Treaty of Wereloe) was signed in Värälä, Elimäki Municipality, Finland, between Russia (represented by Otto Heinrich Igelström) and Sweden (represented by Gustaf Mauritz Armfelt). It was signed on 14 August 1790 and concluded the Russo-Swedish War. The treaty confirmed status quo ante bellum with respect to the borders; however, Russia's right to interfere with Swedish interior affairs from the Treaty of Nystad was expressly revoked. The provisions of the previous Treaty of Åbo were basically confirmed.

A year later, on 19 October 1791, a convention was signed in Stockholm, whereby the countries pledged to assist each other in case of foreign attack. The treaty anticipated the First Coalition in its being directed against Revolutionary France. Catherine bound herself to pay her new ally annual subsidies amounting to 300,000 rubles. Gustav III had sent to his cousin, Catherine II of Russia, a letter in which he besought her to "forget the war as a passing cloud" and invoked their common blood as his claim to enjoy amitie with his cousin.

== See also ==
- List of treaties
