= Savitaipale =

- Municipality
- Savitaipaleen kunta Savitaipale kommun
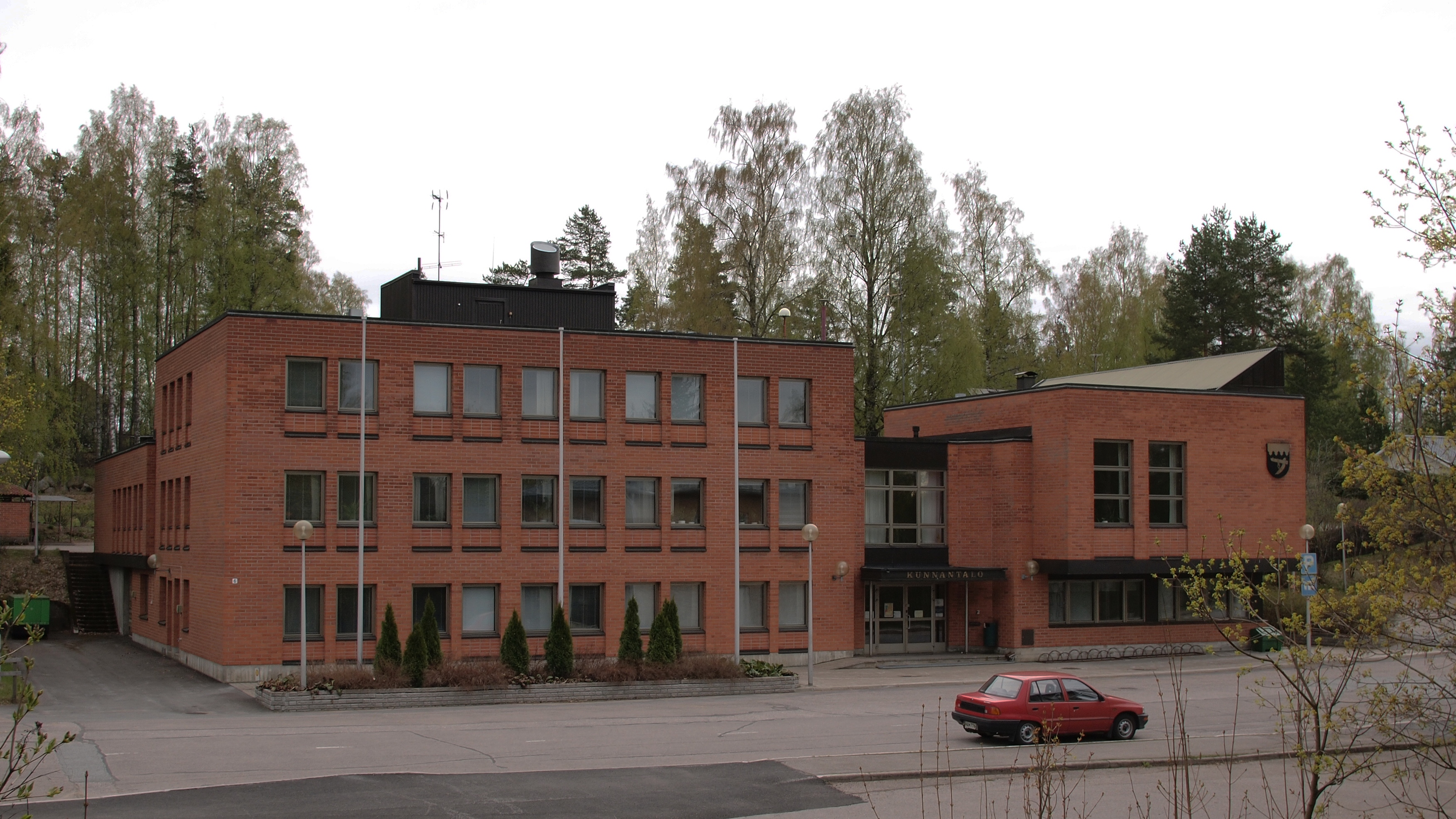
- Savitaipale town hall

- Coat of arms

- Location of Savitaipale in Finland
- Interactive map of Savitaipale
- Coordinates: 61°12′N 027°41′E
- Country: Finland
- Region: South Karelia
- Sub-region: Lappeenranta sub-region
- Charter: 1639
- Municipality: 1867

Government
  - Municipal manager: Johanna Mäkelä

Area (2018-01-01)
  - Total: 690.56 km^{2} (266.63 sq mi)
  - Land: 539.11 km^{2} (208.15 sq mi)
  - Water: 150.81 km^{2} (58.23 sq mi)
  - Rank: 160th largest in Finland

Population (2025-12-31)
  - Total: 3,094
  - Rank: 210th largest in Finland
  - Density: 5.74/km^{2} (14.9/sq mi)

Population by native language
  - Finnish: 96.5% (official)
  - Swedish: 0.4%
  - Others: 3%

Population by age
  - 0 to 14: 10.9%
  - 15 to 64: 49.8%
  - 65 or older: 39.2%
- Time zone: UTC+02:00 (EET)
  - Summer (DST): UTC+03:00 (EEST)
- Website: www.savitaipale.fi/en

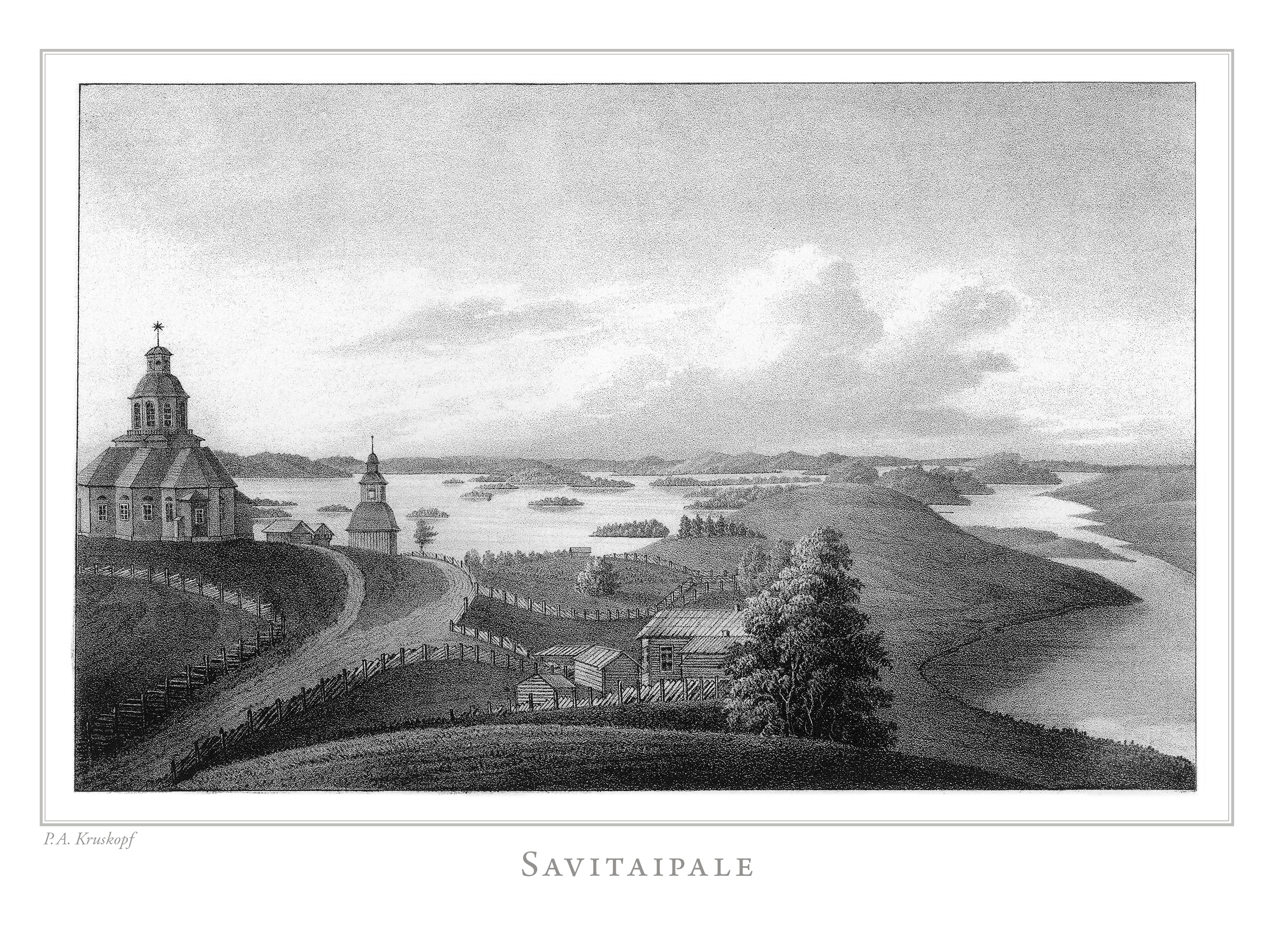
Illustration in Finland framstäldt i teckningar edited by Zacharias Topelius and published 1845-1852.

Savitaipale (Finnish: [ˈsɑʋiˌtɑi̯pɑle]; literally translated the "clay passage") is a municipality of Finland. It is located in the South Karelia region. The municipality has a population of 3,094 (31 December 2025) and covers an area of 690.56 square kilometres (266.63 sq mi) of which 150.81 km^{2} (58.23 sq mi) is water. The population density is 5.74 inhabitants per square kilometre (14.9/sq mi).

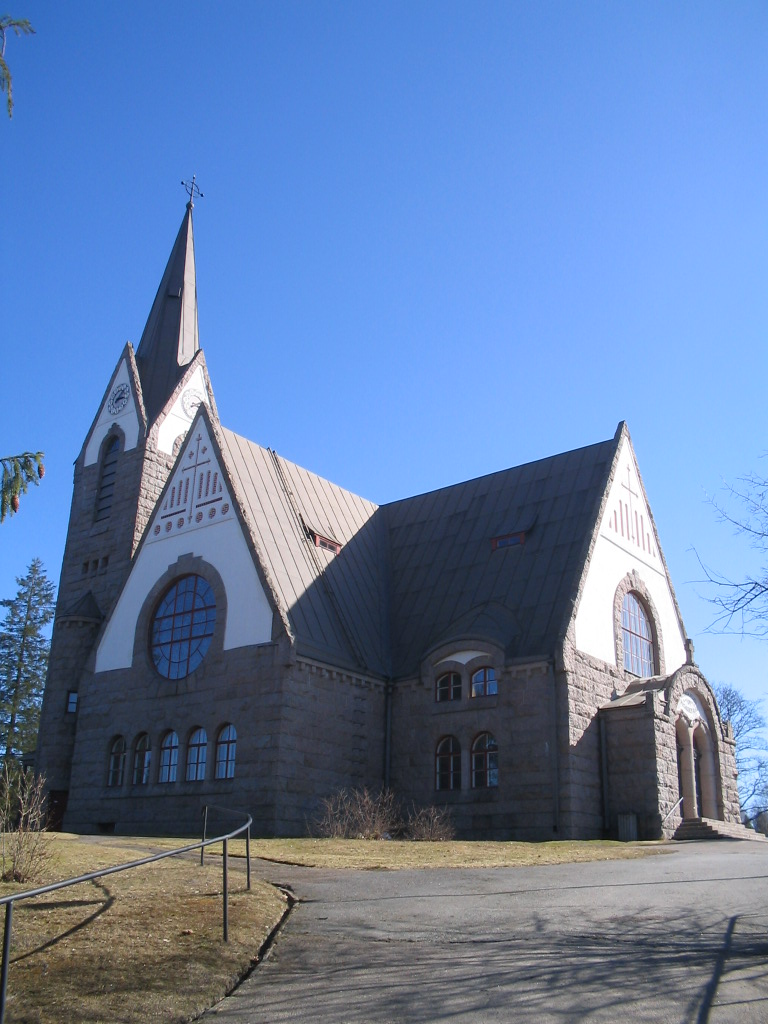
Savitaipale Church

The bastionné line of the coat of arms refers to Savitaipale's position as a border keeper in the period between the Treaty of Åbo (Turku) concluded in 1743 and the border review carried out in 1812. The plough in the coat of arms refers to the local agriculture in the region. The coat of arms was designed by Viljo Savikurki, and the Savitaipale municipal council approved it on January 2, 1953. The Ministry of the Interior approved the coat of arms for use on March 3 of the same year.

== People ==
- Jonni Myyrä (1892–1955)
- Päivi Tikkanen (born 1960)
- Taneli Tikka (born 1978)

== See also ==
- "Savitaipaleen polkka" — also known as "Ievan polkka"
- Kärnäkoski Fortress — a bastion fortress in Kärnäkoski, Savitaipale
