= Jyväskylä =

City in Central Finland, Finland

- City
- Jyväskylän kaupunki Jyväskylä stad City of Jyväskylä
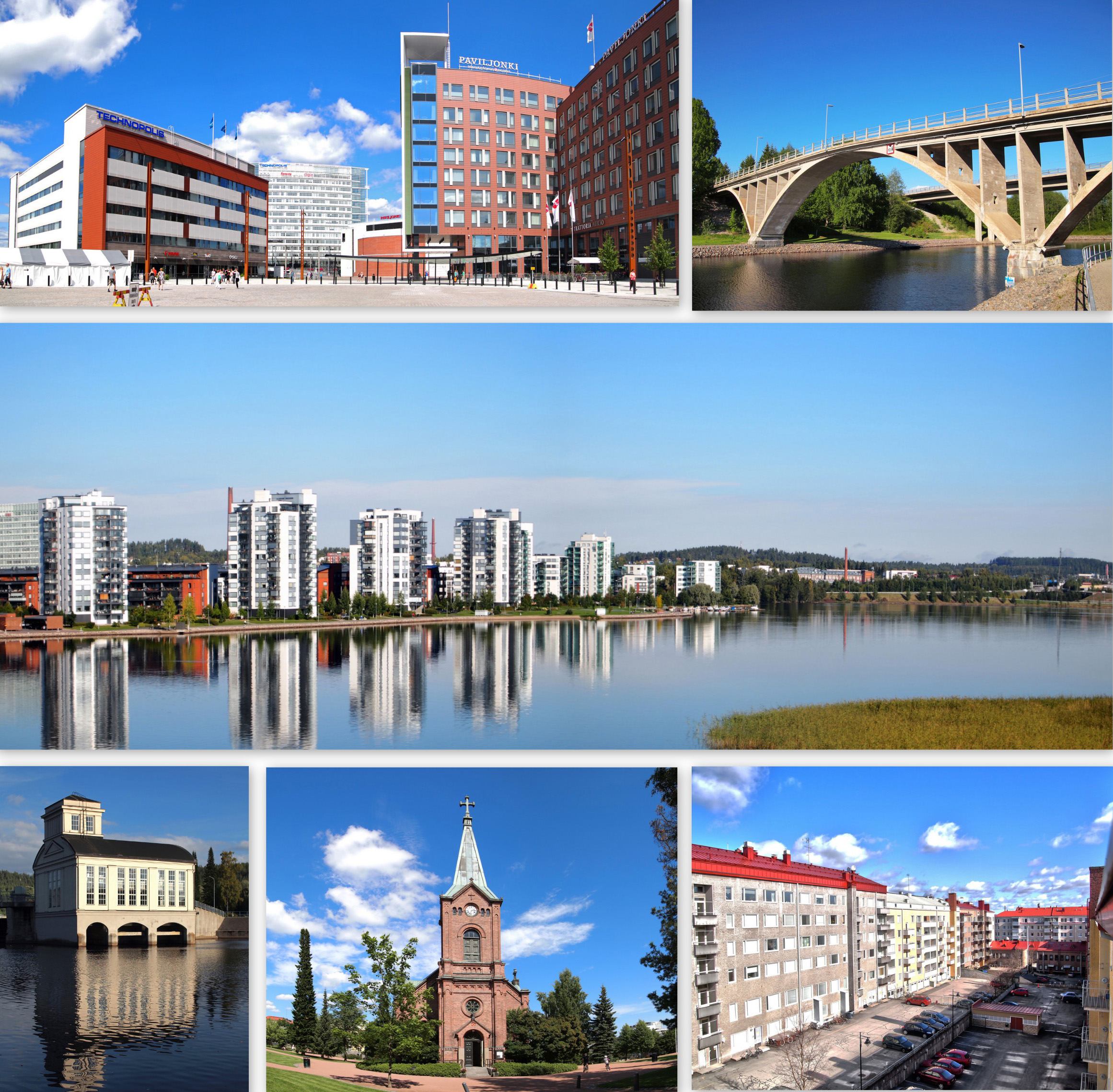
- Clockwise from top-left: Lutakko Square, Äijälänsalmi Strait, apartments in Lutakko, old power station of Vaajakoski, the Jyväskylä City Church, and a courtyard in downtown Jyväskylä

- Coat of arms
- Nicknames: Athens of Finland; Capital of Finnish rap; Capital of Finnish sport; Jykylä
- Location of Jyväskylä in Finland
- Interactive map of Jyväskylä
- Coordinates: 62°14.5′N 025°44.5′E
- Country: Finland
- Region: Central Finland
- Sub-region: Jyväskylä
- Charter: 1837

Government
  - City manager: Timo Koivisto

Area (2018-01-01)
  - City: 1,466.35 km^{2} (566.16 sq mi)
  - Land: 1,171.03 km^{2} (452.14 sq mi)
  - Water: 295.35 km^{2} (114.04 sq mi)
  - Urban: 99.25 km^{2} (38.32 sq mi)
  - Rank: 61st largest in Finland

Population (2024)
  - City: 136,164
  - Rank: 7th largest in Finland
  - Density: 128/km^{2} (330/sq mi)
  - Urban: 117,974
  - Urban density: 1,188.7/km^{2} (3,079/sq mi)
  - Municipality: 149,194

Population by native language
  - Finnish: 91.8% (official)
  - Swedish: 0.2%
  - Others: 8%

Population by age
  - 0 to 14: 15.2%
  - 15 to 64: 66.2%
  - 65 or older: 18.6%
- Time zone: UTC+02:00 (EET)
  - Summer (DST): UTC+03:00 (EEST)
- Unemployment rate: 11.8%
- Website: www.jyvaskyla.fi/en/

Jyväskylä (Finnish: [ˈjyʋæsˌkylæ]) is a city in Finland and the regional capital of Central Finland. It is located in the Finnish Lakeland. The population of Jyväskylä is approximately 150,000, while the sub-region has a population of approximately 193,000. It is Finland's 7th most populous municipality, and fifth most populous urban area.

Jyväskylä is located about 150 km (93 mi) northeast of Tampere, the third largest city in Finland; and about 270 km (170 mi) north of Helsinki, the national capital. The Jyväskylä sub-region includes Jyväskylä, Hankasalmi, Laukaa, Muurame, Petäjävesi, Toivakka, and Uurainen. Other neighbouring municipalities of Jyväskylä are Joutsa, Jämsä and Luhanka.

Jyväskylä is the largest city in the Central Finland and Finnish Lakeland region. Jyväskylä was one of the fastest growing cities in Finland during the 20th century; in 1940, there were only 8,000 inhabitants in Jyväskylä.

Elias Lönnrot, the author of the Finnish national epic, the Kalevala, nicknamed the city "the Athens of Finland". This nickname refers to Jyväskylä's important role as an educational centre. The works of the famous Finnish architect Alvar Aalto can be seen throughout the city. The city hosts the Rally Finland, which is part of the World Rally Championship. The annual Jyväskylä Arts Festival is also held in the city.

== Etymology ==
The second part of the city's name, kylä, means village. The first part of the city's name, jyväs-, looks like the stem of an adjective *jyvänen, derived from jyvä, "grain" (compare Wiktionary). Alternatively, it has been associated with Taxus, a genus of yews, and the Old Prussian word juwis. It has also been speculated that the word jyväs refers to the sun's reflection of the surface of the water.

Erkki Fredrikson, the curator of the Museum of Central Finland, put forward a theory related to the name, that the origin word for the city's name was syväs and not jyväs, and that the name was once derived from Jyväsjoki (literally the "grain river"), which, according to Fredrikson's assumption, was actually called Syväsjoki (literally the "deep river"). However, the name Jyväsjoki was registered in 1506 for the region's first known resident, Heikki Ihanninpoika Jyväsjoki. His house was located at the mouth of the Äijälänjoki River, which in Fredrikson's opinion also supports the Syväsjoki theory. The village, known at the beginning as Jyväsjoki village, gradually transformed into Jyväskylä.

== History ==
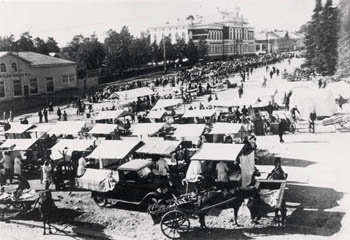
Jyväskylä town square in the early 20th century

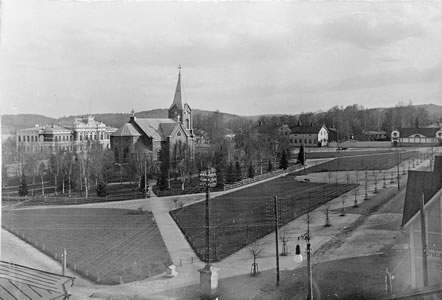
Kirkkopuisto Park in the early 20th century

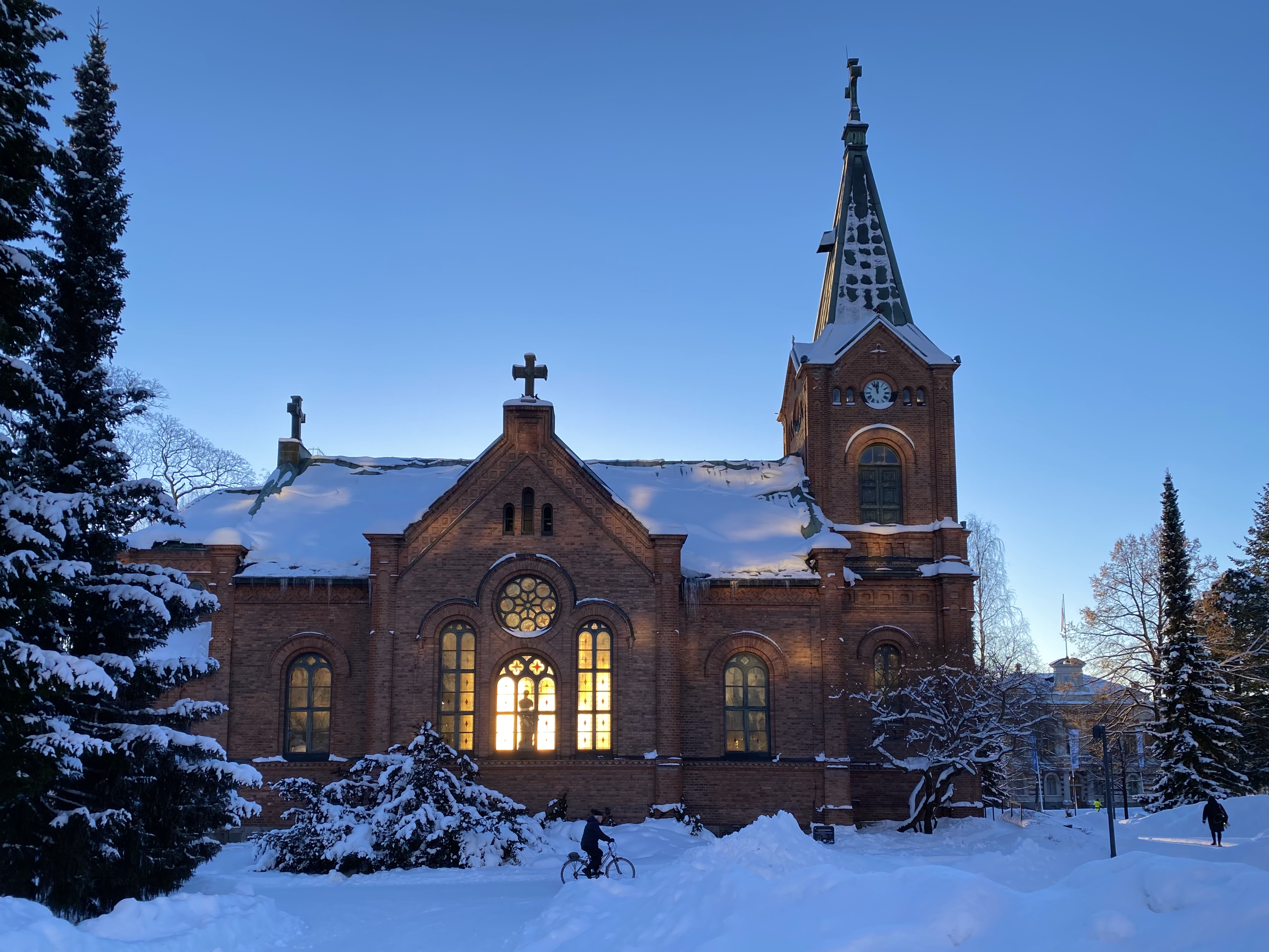
Kirkkopuisto Park in 2022

In the Jyväskylä region, there are archeological findings from the Stone Age. According to the oldest available taxation documents (maakirja), there were seven estates on the Jyväskylä region in 1539. One of them, the estate of Mattila, alone possessed the areas stretching from the village of Keljo to the villages of Vesanka and Palokka. The oldest estate in Jyväskylä continuously held by the same family is the estate of Lahti, which emerged when the estate of Mattila was split between two brothers in 1600. The history of the Lahti family and estate have had a significant impact on the development of Jyväskylä region. Lahdenrinne, in the south-west corner of Jyväsjärvi lake, belongs to the old heartland of the estate of Lahti.

The name Jyväskylä was mentioned in 1575 as Jyueskylä. Its name is derived from the lake Jyväsjärvi. A shorter form of the name, Jyväs (written Jyuexe) was mentioned slightly earlier in 1565 and again (this time written Jyues) in 1570.

The City of Jyväskylä was founded on 22 March 1837, when Emperor of Russia and Grand Duke of Finland, Nicholas I of Russia, signed the charter of the city and the infrastructure was essentially built from scratch; before that, Jyväskylä was a village belonging to the larger rural municipality of Laukaa, being the largest village of the whole parish. At the times Finnish military battalion Suomen kaarti participated under his rule in military operations against the Polish November Uprising and later in Hungary, Turkey and Bessarabia (today Moldova). While Nicholas I of Russia abolished many autonomous areas, it has been argued, that the loyalty of Finnish military influenced his approach towards Finnish autonomy. The original town was built between Lake Jyväsjärvi (which is connected to Lake Päijänne) and the Jyväskylä ridge (Harju), and consisted of most of the current grid-style city centre.

The establishment of schools in the 1850s and '60s proved to be the most significant step in regards to the later development of Jyväskylä. The first three Finnish-speaking schools in the world were founded in Jyväskylä, the lycée in 1858, the teachers' college in 1863, and the girls' school in 1864. Well-trained teaching staff and pupils from different parts of the country changed the atmosphere of Jyväskylä irrevocably.

In the early 20th century, the town expanded several times. Most of today's Jyväskylä was built after the Continuation War, when evacuees from ceded territories were settled in the city, and housing was badly needed. During the 21st century Jyväskylä has grown fast – by over 1,000 inhabitants every year.

Säynätsalo was consolidated with Jyväskylä in 1993, and Jyväskylän maalaiskunta and Korpilahti, for their part, on January 1, 2009.

== Geography ==
Jyväskylä is located on the northern coast of Lake Päijänne, 147 kilometres (91 mi) north-east of Tampere, 148 kilometres (92 mi) south-west of Kuopio and 270 kilometres (170 mi) north of Helsinki. The hilly and forested terrain in Jyväskylä is surrounded by hundreds of lakes. To reach Jyväskylä from the east, one needs to go through or pass the hill Kanavuori, which used to host a military depot full of ammunition and armaments.

Jyväskylä is located in the Finnish Lakeland. There are 328 lakes in the city, and lakes and rivers constitute 20,1% (295 km^{2}; 114 sq mi) of the total area of the city. The city's largest lakes include Päijänne, Leppävesi, Tuomiojärvi, Palokkajärvi, Luonetjärvi, and Alvajärvi. The city center is located on the shores of Jyväsjärvi.

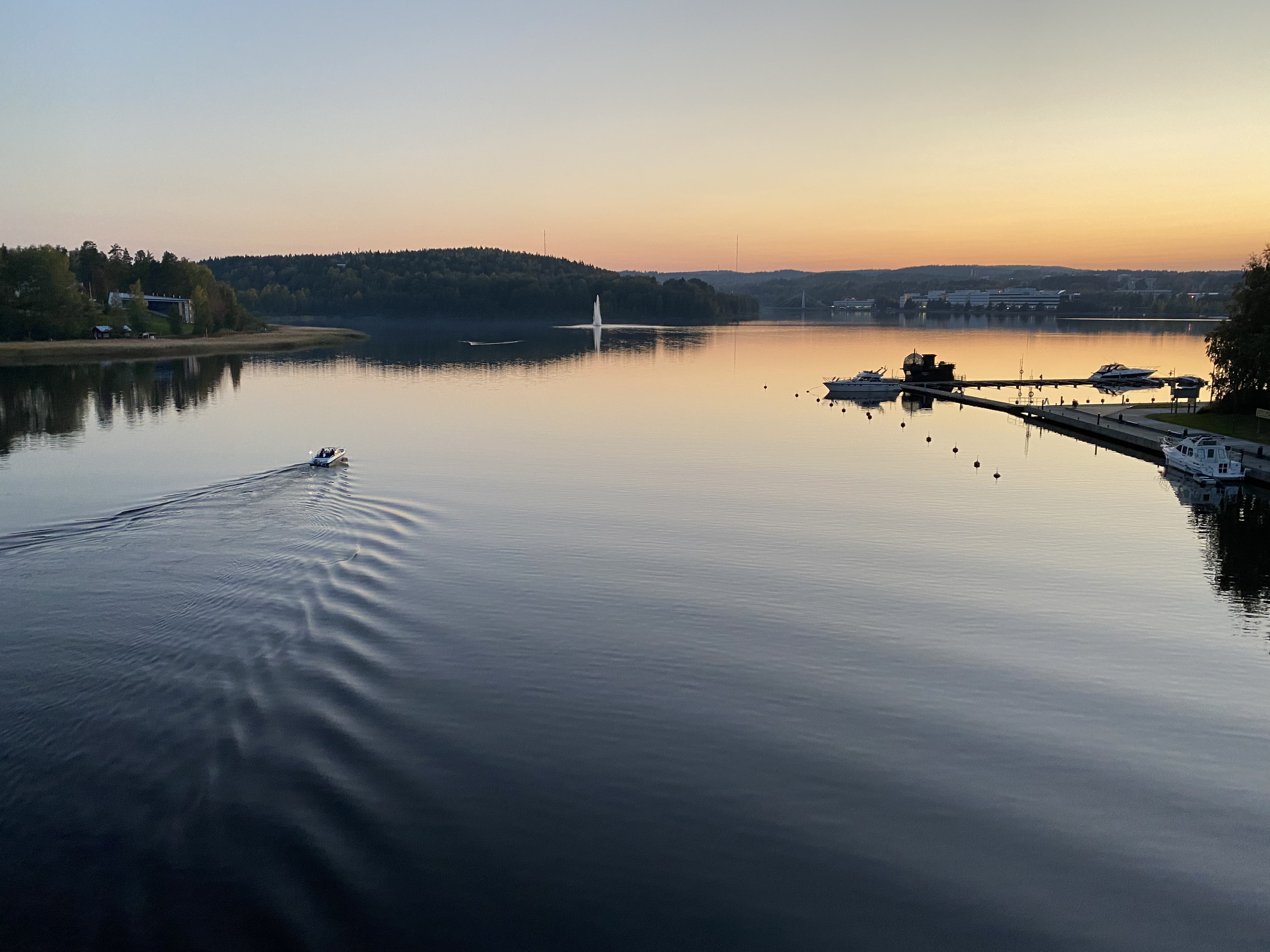
View over lake Jyväsjärvi from Kuokkala bridge

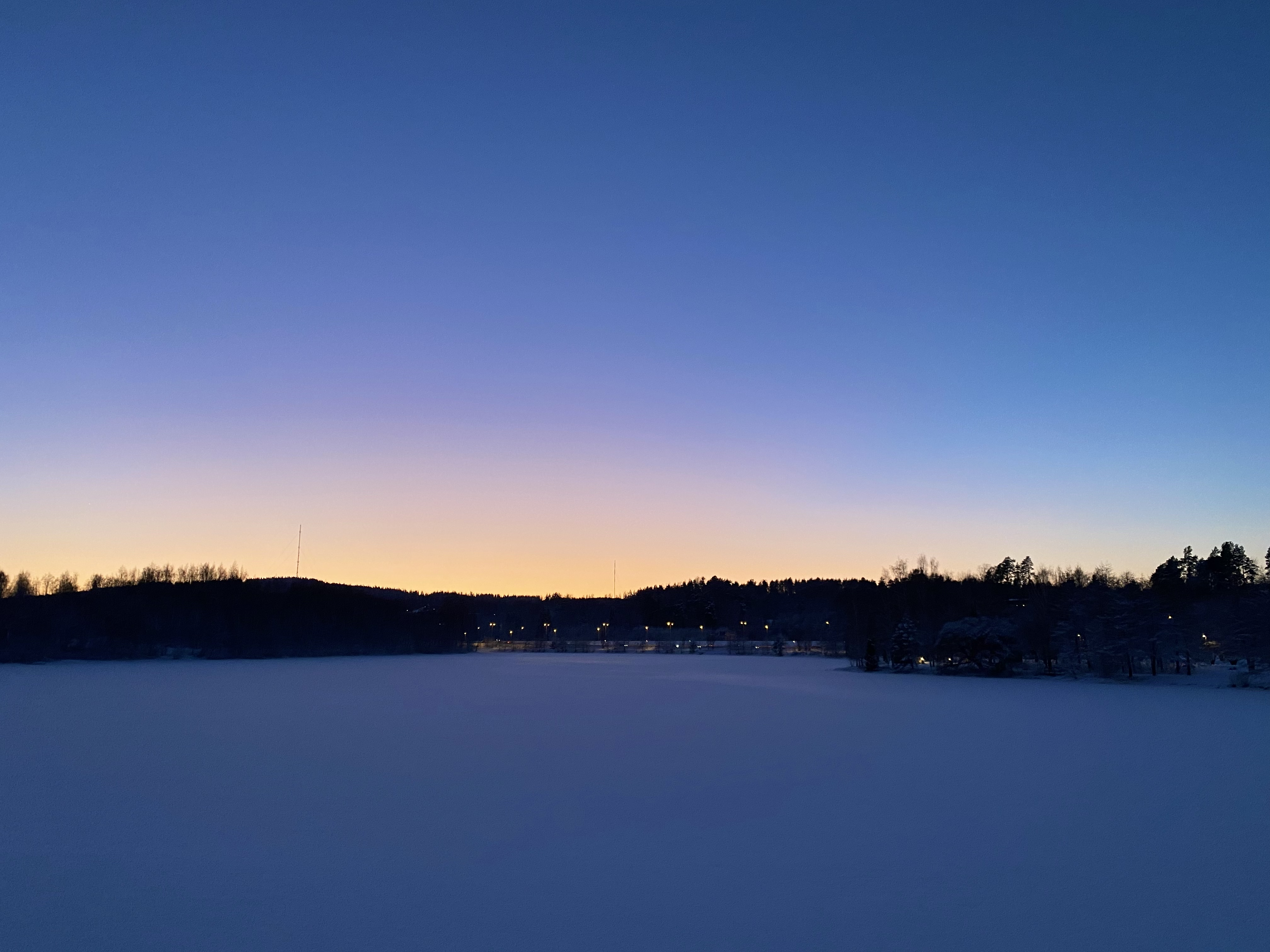
Frozen lake Jyväsjärvi in winter

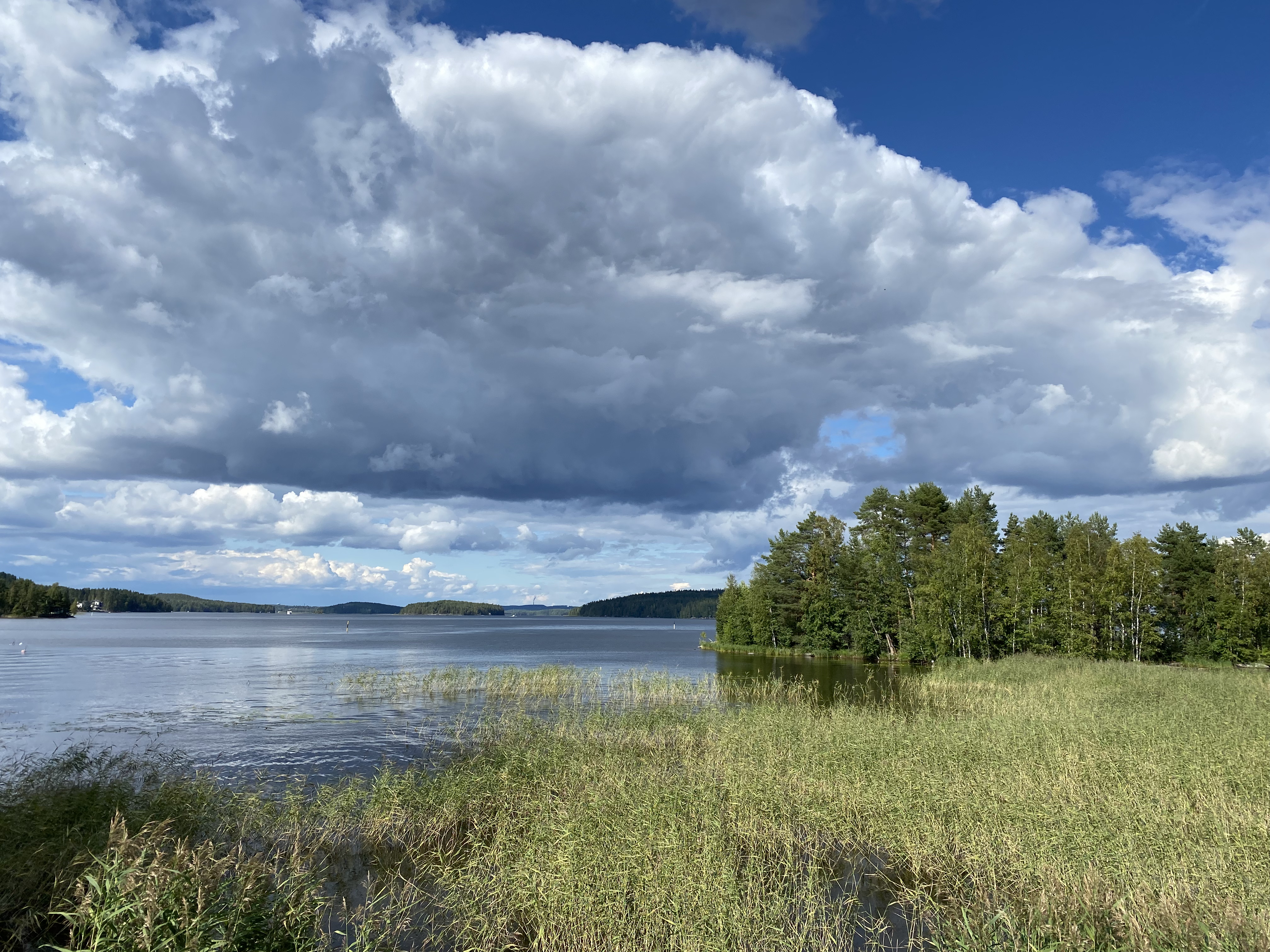
Northern lake Päijänne near Säynätsalo

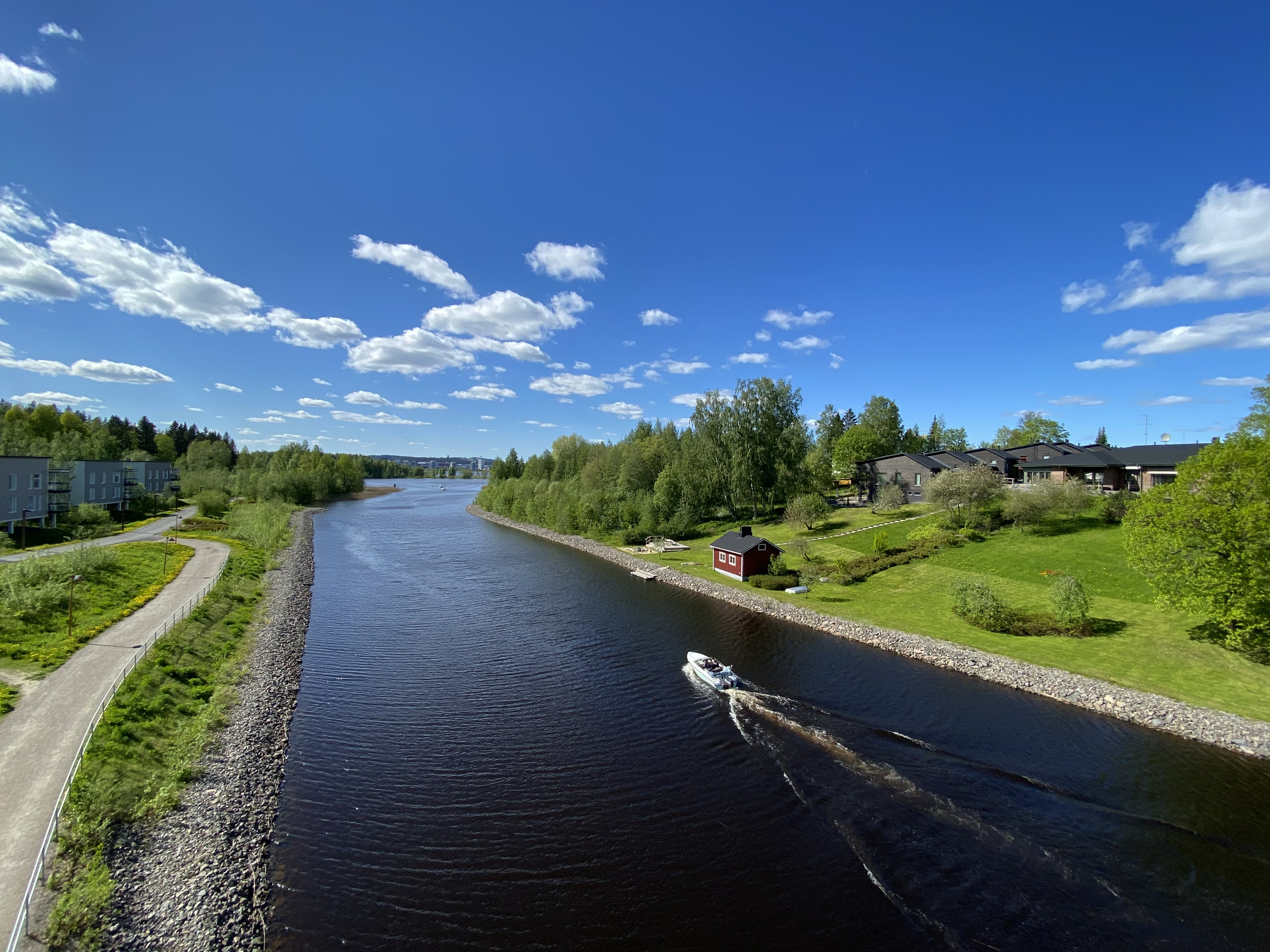
Channel connecting lakes Jyväsjärvi and Päijänne

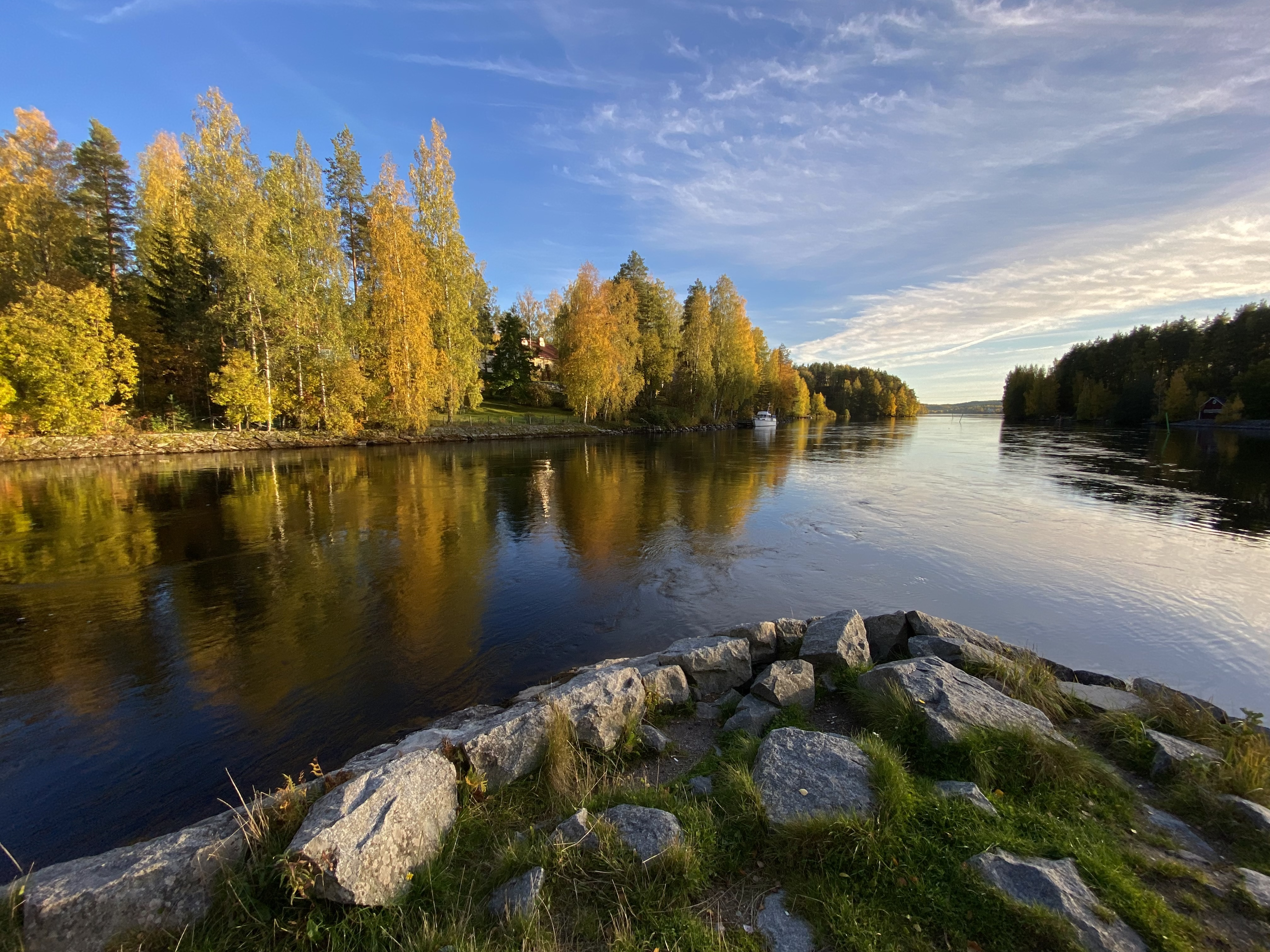
View on Vaajavirta river from Naissaari island

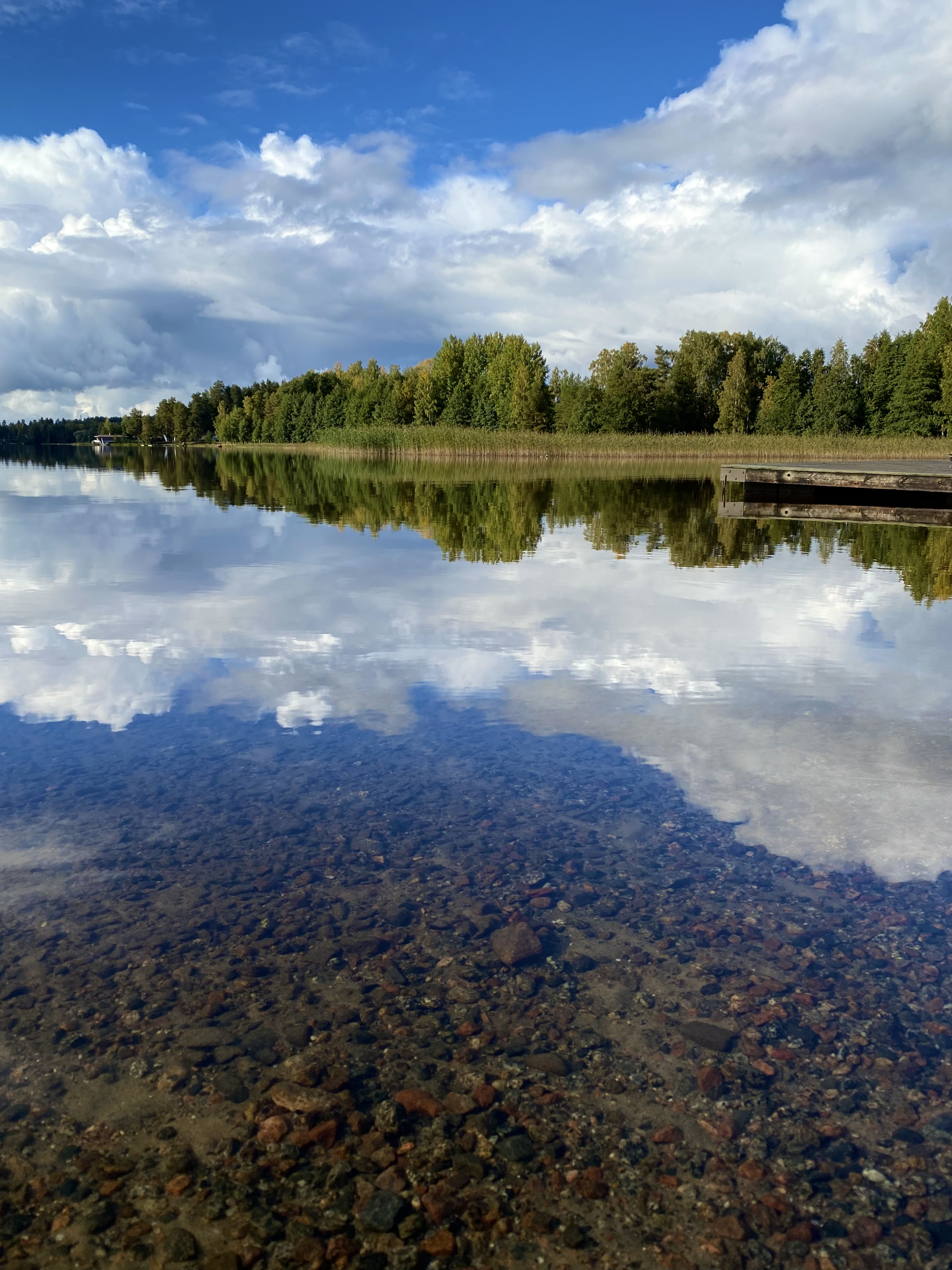
Lake Tuomiojärvi

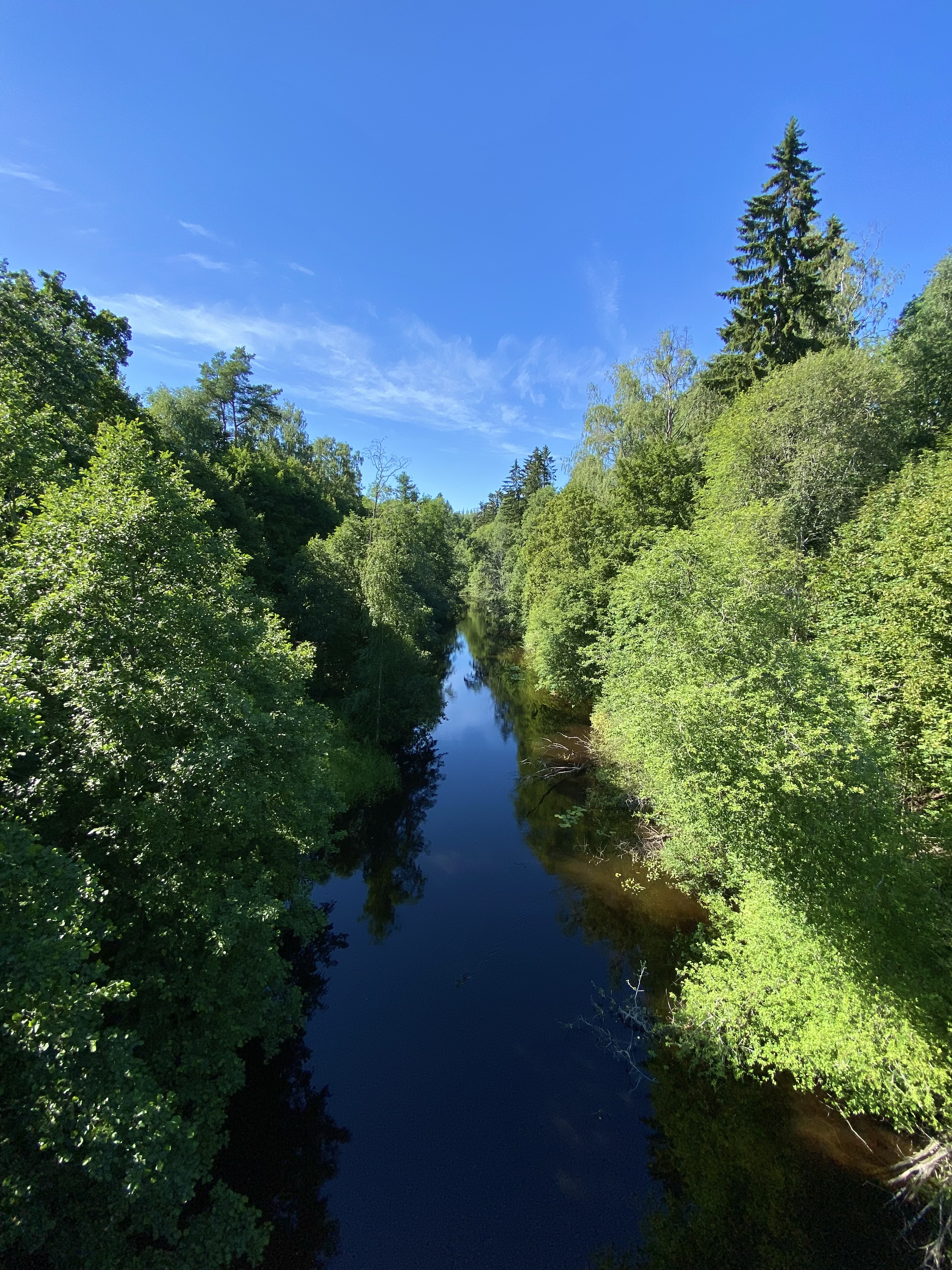
Tourujoki in summertime

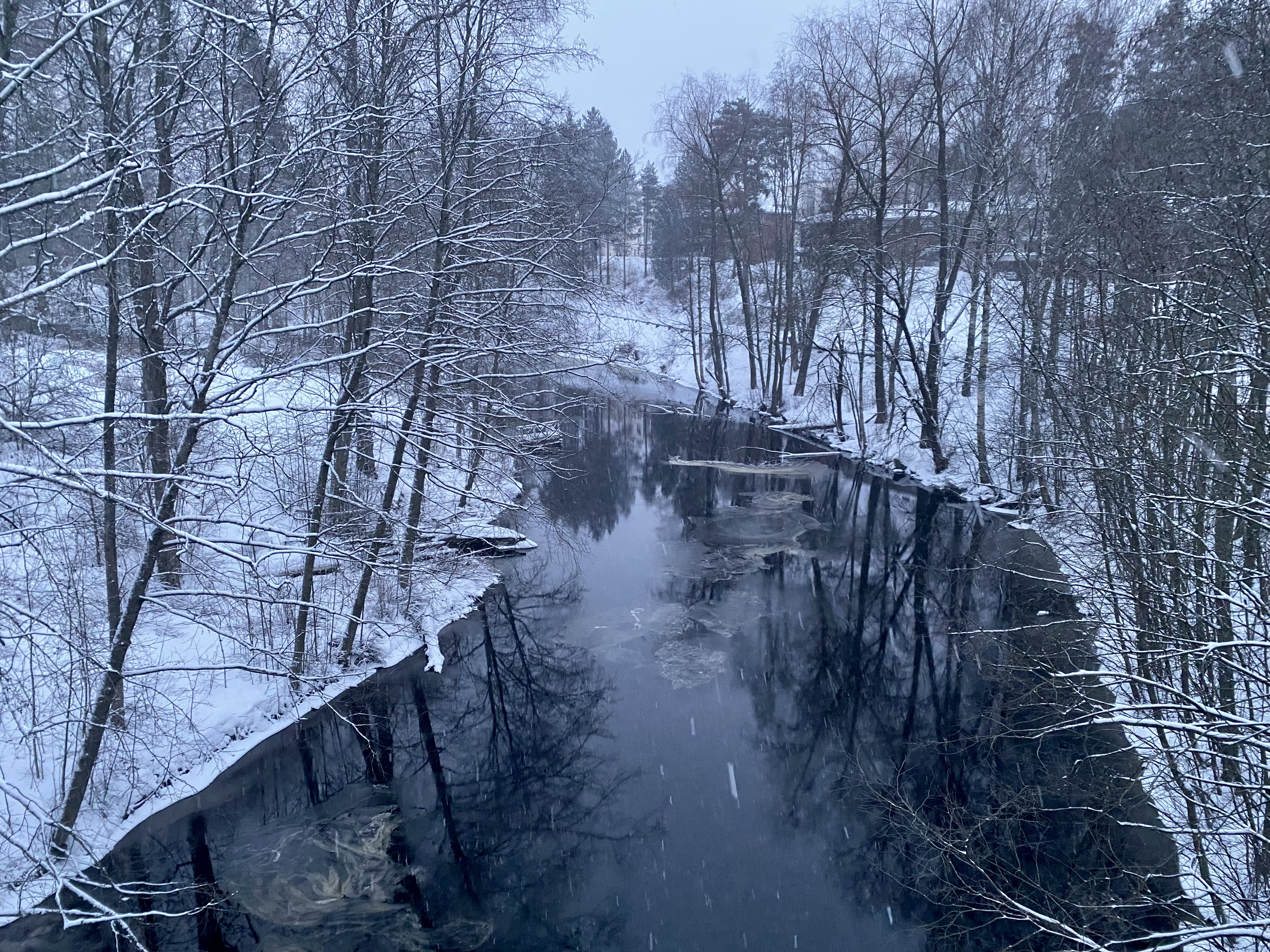
Tourujoki in wintertime

The landscape in Jyväskylä is hilly, forested and full of waters. The architect Alvar Aalto compared the hilly landscape of Jyväskylä to Toscana in Italy: "The slope of Jyväskylä ridge is almost like the mountain vineyards of Fiesole".

=== Climate ===
The defined climate is subarctic continental (Köppen: Dfc). Because of its northern location, winters are long, snowy, cold, and dark. During midwinter, the city receives daylight for only around five hours. Summers are mild, with the average daily maximum temperature being 22 °C (72 °F) in July. During the summer, Jyväskylä experiences long daylight and white nights i.e. midnight twilight.

Climate data for Jyväskylä Airport (1991-2020 normals, extremes 1959-present)
Month	Jan	Feb	Mar	Apr	May	Jun	Jul	Aug	Sep	Oct	Nov	Dec	Year
Record high °C (°F)	7.8 (46.0)	11.0 (51.8)	16.2 (61.2)	22.6 (72.7)	29.3 (84.7)	32.8 (91.0)	34.2 (93.6)	32.3 (90.1)	26.2 (79.2)	20.1 (68.2)	13.2 (55.8)	9.4 (48.9)	34.2 (93.6)
Mean maximum °C (°F)	3.3 (37.9)	3.4 (38.1)	8.6 (47.5)	16.8 (62.2)	24.3 (75.7)	26.8 (80.2)	28.1 (82.6)	26.3 (79.3)	20.4 (68.7)	13.0 (55.4)	7.6 (45.7)	3.9 (39.0)	29.3 (84.7)
Mean daily maximum °C (°F)	−4.3 (24.3)	−3.9 (25.0)	0.9 (33.6)	7.5 (45.5)	15.0 (59.0)	19.4 (66.9)	22.0 (71.6)	19.8 (67.6)	13.9 (57.0)	6.4 (43.5)	1.2 (34.2)	−2.1 (28.2)	8.0 (46.4)
Daily mean °C (°F)	−7.3 (18.9)	−7.6 (18.3)	−3.5 (25.7)	2.5 (36.5)	9.1 (48.4)	14.0 (57.2)	16.7 (62.1)	14.6 (58.3)	9.4 (48.9)	3.6 (38.5)	−0.9 (30.4)	−4.5 (23.9)	3.8 (38.9)
Mean daily minimum °C (°F)	−10.9 (12.4)	−11.5 (11.3)	−8.1 (17.4)	−2.4 (27.7)	2.8 (37.0)	8.2 (46.8)	11.2 (52.2)	9.5 (49.1)	5.1 (41.2)	0.6 (33.1)	−3.2 (26.2)	−7.5 (18.5)	−0.5 (31.1)
Mean minimum °C (°F)	−26.4 (−15.5)	−26.4 (−15.5)	−20.3 (−4.5)	−11.2 (11.8)	−4.5 (23.9)	0.8 (33.4)	4.7 (40.5)	2.4 (36.3)	−2.6 (27.3)	−8.8 (16.2)	−14.4 (6.1)	−20.7 (−5.3)	−29.9 (−21.8)
Record low °C (°F)	−38.5 (−37.3)	−38.5 (−37.3)	−32.7 (−26.9)	−20.5 (−4.9)	−9.0 (15.8)	−3.3 (26.1)	0.9 (33.6)	−2.2 (28.0)	−9.2 (15.4)	−19.3 (−2.7)	−27.2 (−17.0)	−34.8 (−30.6)	−38.5 (−37.3)
Average precipitation mm (inches)	43 (1.7)	33 (1.3)	32 (1.3)	33 (1.3)	43 (1.7)	67 (2.6)	79 (3.1)	67 (2.6)	58 (2.3)	65 (2.6)	53 (2.1)	50 (2.0)	622 (24.5)
Average precipitation days (≥ 0.1 mm)	22	18	15	12	13	15	16	15	16	19	21	22	204
Average snowy days	28.5	27.2	28.9	19.1	0.0	0.0	0.0	0.0	0.1	6.1	19.4	26.2	155.5
Mean monthly sunshine hours	25	63	136	179	252	244	261	208	123	59	20	10	1,580
Source 1: FMI climatological normals for Finland 1991-2020 Weatheronline.co.uk
Source 2: record highs and lows

== Demographics ==
=== Population ===
Historical population
Year	Pop.	±% p.a.
1850	587	—
1870	1,331	+4.18%
1890	2,597	+3.40%
1910	3,619	+1.67%
1920	5,715	+4.67%
1930	7,684	+3.00%
1939	10,091	+3.07%
1972	89,697	+6.84%
1980	96,966	+0.98%
1990	103,921	+0.70%
2000	116,519	+1.15%
2010	130,816	+1.16%
2020	143,420	+0.92%
Source: Tilastollinen päätoimisto, Statistics Finland (1972-2020)

The city of Jyväskylä has 149,895 inhabitants, making it the 7th most populous municipality in Finland. The Jyväskylä region has a population of 193,254, making it the sixth largest region in Finland after Helsinki, Tampere, Turku, Oulu and Lahti. Jyväskylä is home to 3% of Finland's population. 8% of the population has a foreign background, which is lower than in the major Finnish cities of Helsinki, Espoo, Tampere, Vantaa or Turku.

Jyväskylä was the fastest growing Finnish city in the 20th century. The population has continued to grow rapidly in the 21st century.

Population size 1980–2025
Year	Population
1980	96,966
1985	99,993
1990	103,921
1995	109,657
2000	116,519
2005	124,205
2010	130,816
2015	137,368
2020	143,420
2025	149,895

=== Languages ===
Population by
mother tongue (2025)
1. Finnish (91.8%)
2. Russian (1.20%)
3. Ukrainian (0.90%)
4. Persian (0.60%)
5. English (0.50%)
6. Arabic (0.40%)
7. Chinese (0.30%)
8. Other (4.30%)

Jyväskylä is the third largest monolingual Finnish-speaking municipality in Finland after Tampere and Oulu. The majority of the population, 137,582 persons (91.8%), spoke Finnish as their first language. In addition, the number of Swedish speakers was 280 persons (0.2%) of the population. Foreign languages were spoken by 8% of the population. As English and Swedish are compulsory school subjects, functional bilingualism or trilingualism acquired through language studies is not uncommon.

At least 100 different languages are spoken in Jyväskylä. The most widely spoken foreign languages are Russian (1.2%), Ukrainian (0.9%), Farsi (0.6%), English (0.5%), Arabic (0.4%), Chinese (0.3%) and Kurdish (0.3%).

=== Immigration ===
Population by country of birth (2025)
Country of birth	Population	%
Finland	137,704	91.9
Soviet Union	1,751	1.2
Ukraine	766	0.5
Sweden	766	0.5
Iran	508	0.3
Russia	498	0.3
China	478	0.3
Sri Lanka	454	0.3
Afghanistan	400	0.3
India	385	0.3
Other	6,757	4.5

As of 2024, 11,469 people with a foreign background lived in Jyväskylä, representing 8% of the population. (Note: Statistics Finland classifies a person as having a "foreign background" if both parents or the only known parent were born abroad.) There are 11,572 residents who were born abroad, which makes up 8% of the population. The number of foreign citizens in Jyväskylä is 7,836.

The relative share of immigrants in Jyväskylä's population is below the national average. Nevertheless, the city's new residents are increasingly of foreign origin. This will increase the proportion of foreign residents in the coming years.

=== Religion ===
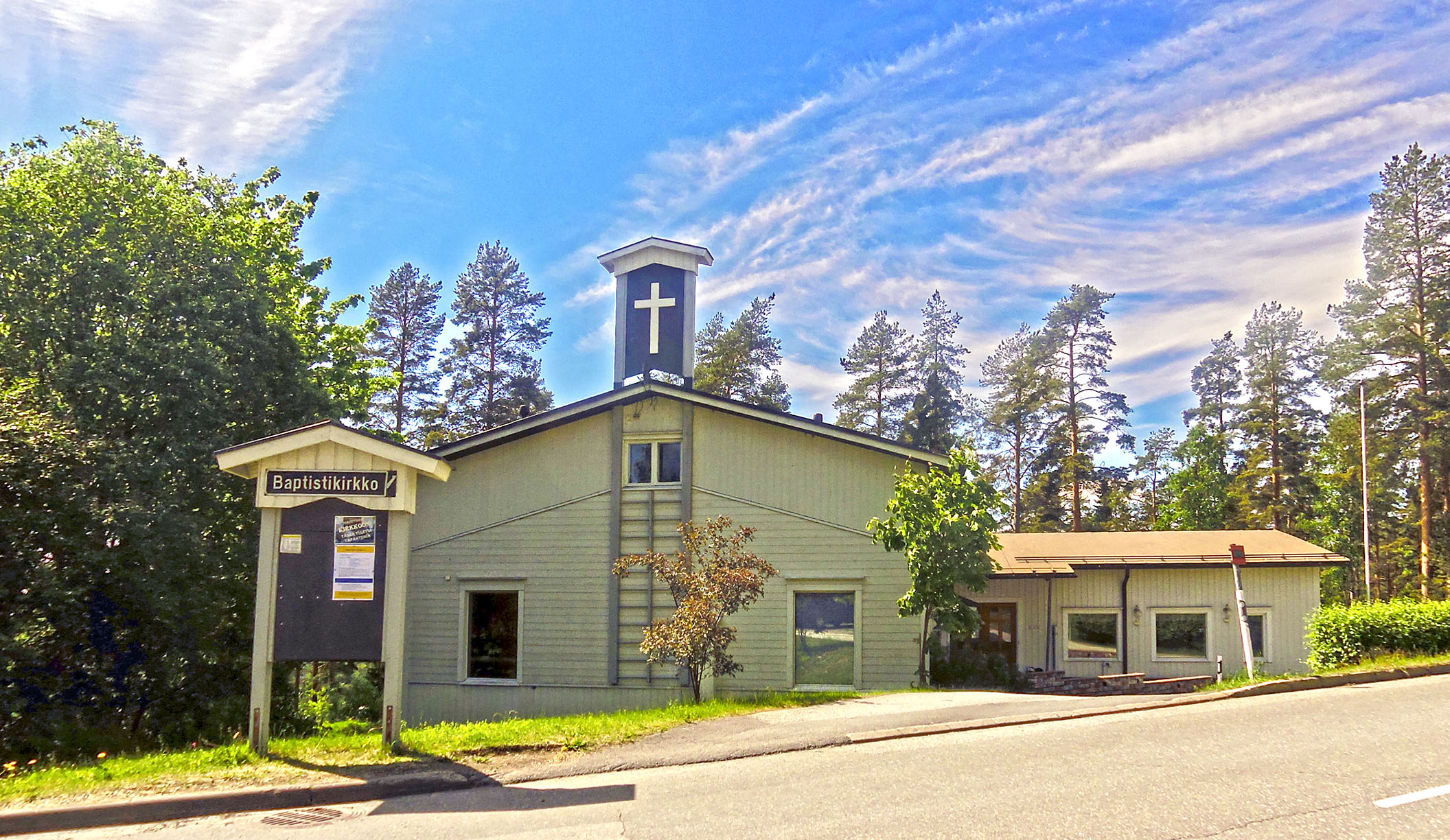
The Baptist church building located in Vaajakoski, Jyväskylä

In 2023, the Evangelical Lutheran Church was the largest religious group with 62.1% of the population of Jyväskylä. Other religious groups accounted for 3.1% of the population. 34.8% of the population had no religious affiliation.

== Military ==
Jyväskylä hosts the headquarters of the Finnish Air Force, in Tikkakoski. As a central location, it has traditionally been important base for military operations. Jyväskylä became known as major firearms manufacturer (Tikkakoski) during the world wars, producing machine guns and ammunition.

According to reporting in Helsingin Sanomat, since the 1990s Jyväskylä has served as a signals intelligence collection site, primarily targeting military maneuvers around St. Petersburg.

== Economy ==
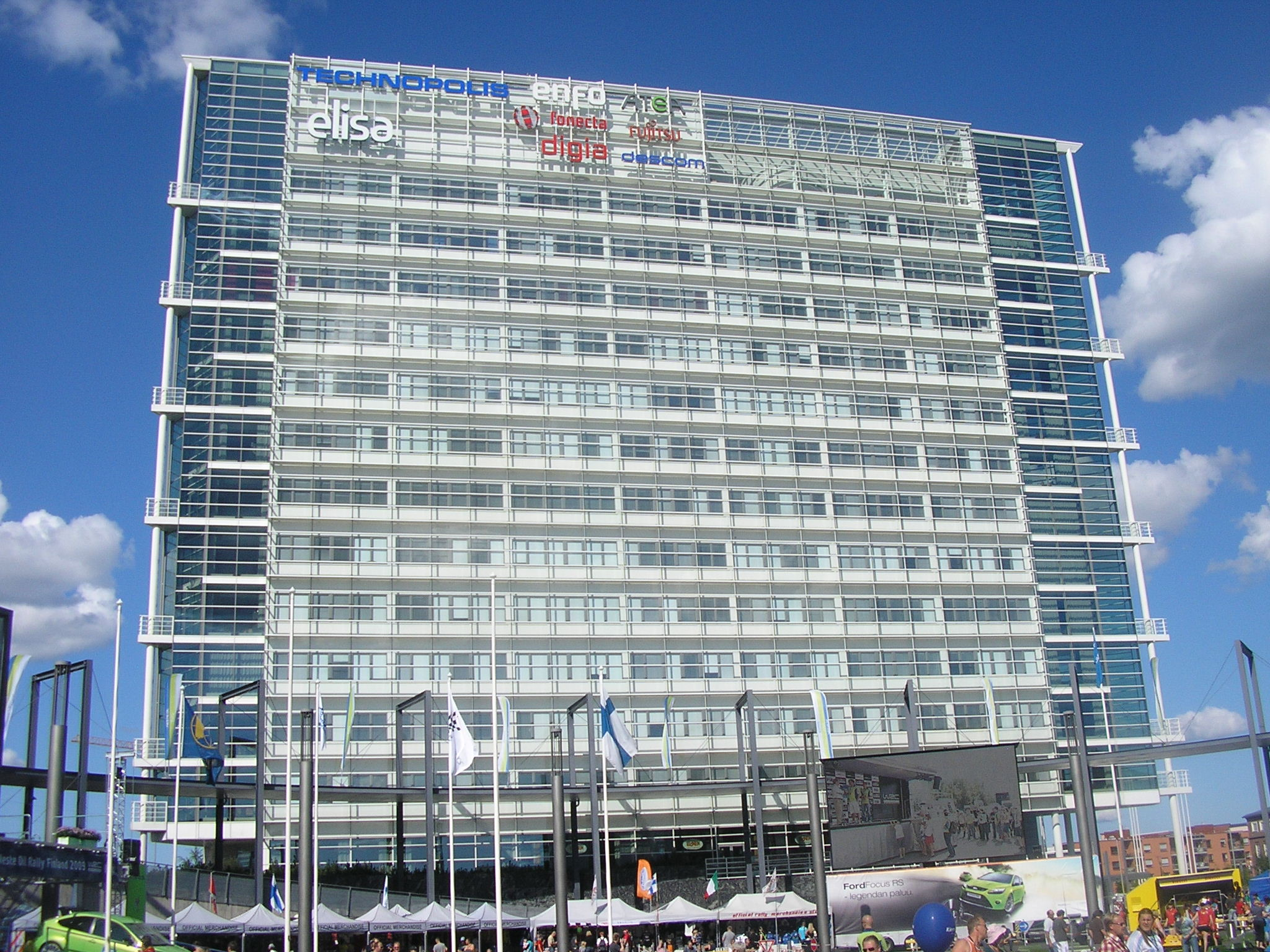
Jyväskylä is a hub of IT. Innova Tower hosts multiple tech companies.

Because of excellent connections, Jyväskylä was a busy marketplace even before the first permanent settlements were founded in the current city centre. The establishment of Finland's first three Finnish-speaking schools: the lycée in 1858, the teachers' college in 1863, and the girls' school in 1864 proved to be the most significant steps in regards to later development of Jyväskylä. Educational services became the heart of the economic growth of the city. In 1912 Wilhelm Schauman founded a plywood mill on the shores of Jyväsjärvi. Schaumans plywood factory soon became the country's largest producer of plywood. Soon other kinds of forest based businesses opened factories and premises in the city. Thus, lumber, pulp, and paper became the second stronghold of the economy in Jyväskylä. Later, the high quality education and paper machinery industry tempted information technology businesses to settle in the city.

Nowadays, the main sources of subsistence in Jyväskylä are educational and health care services, paper machinery production, information technology, and renewable energy. The most important private employers are paper machinery producer Metso ltd., retail trade company Keskimaa Cooperative Society, real estate service company ISS, and wind turbine gear manufacturer Moventas. The biggest public employers are the City of Jyväskylä, the Central Finland Health Care District, the University of Jyväskylä, and the Air Force Academy.

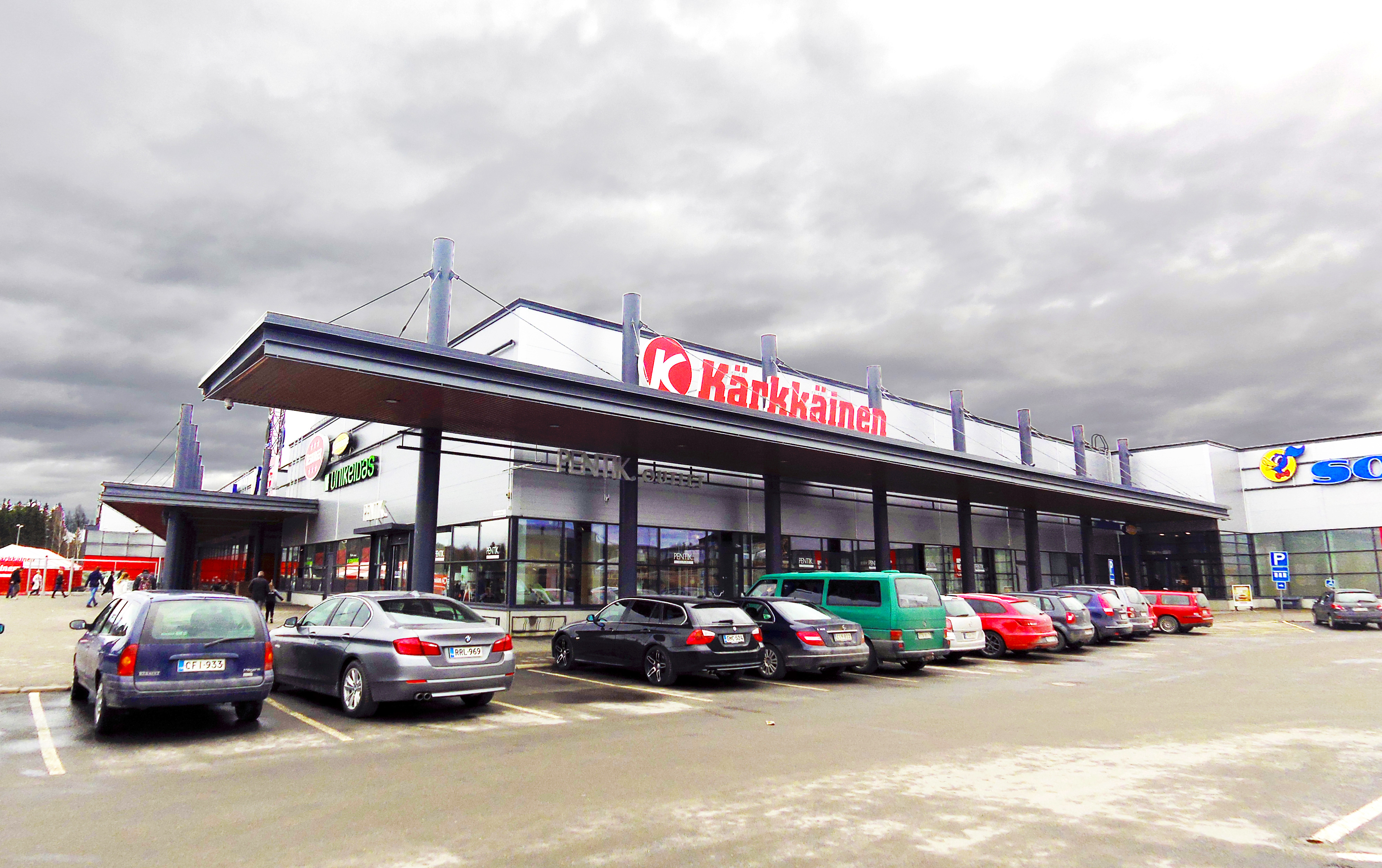
J. Kärkkäinen discount store in Jyväskylä

As of 2010, only 1% of the labor force works on the primary sector, 21% on the secondary sector, and 78% on the service sector of the economy.

In April 2012, the unemployment rate in Jyväskylä was 12.2%, which was higher than average in Finland (9.8% in 1/2012). As of July 2012, there are about 61,000 jobs in Jyväskylä. The average income per income earner was €24,380 in 2010.

In 2011, Jyväskylä topped in an image evaluation study among businesses. The city reached the highest score of large Finnish cities in the study, succeeding especially in the availability of skilled work force, on commercial services, on transport connections, and on geographical location.

The Gross domestic product per capita in the city of Jyväskylä was €33,688 in 2005. The self-sufficiency in workplaces exceeded 100% in the city, raising the GDP per capita higher than the national average. The GDP per capita of the whole Jyväskylä region was €28,718 in 2007. The regional GDP per capita is lower than the Finnish national average, mainly due to high number of students and a relatively high unemployment rate.

== Culture ==
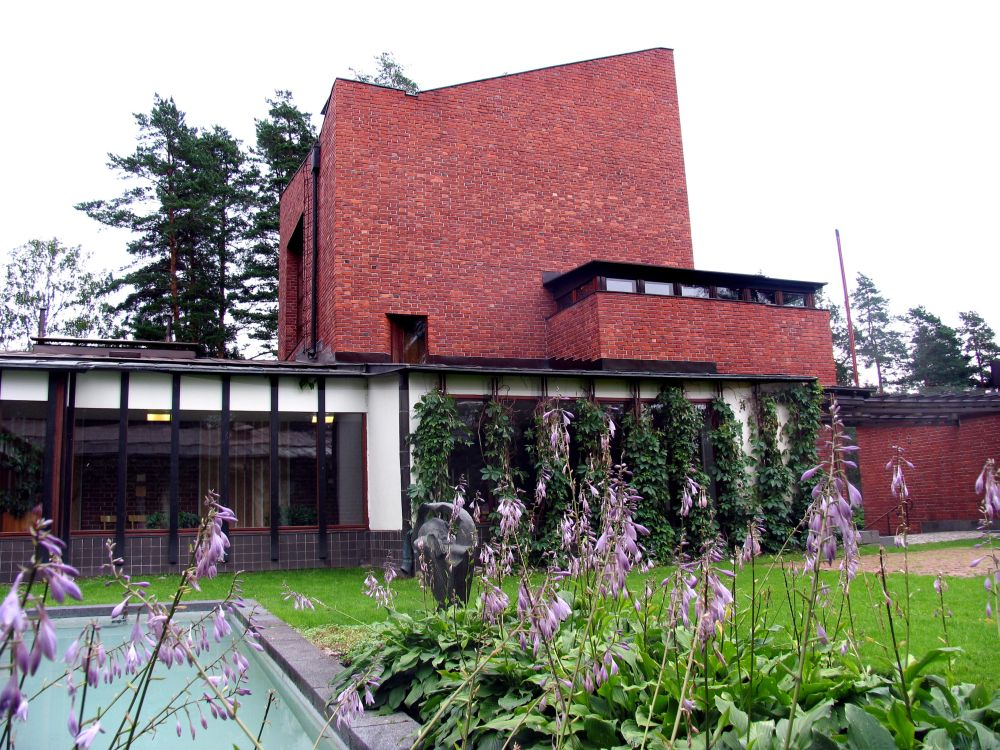
Functionalistic Säynätsalo Town Hall by Alvar Aalto is open also for visitors interested in his architecture.

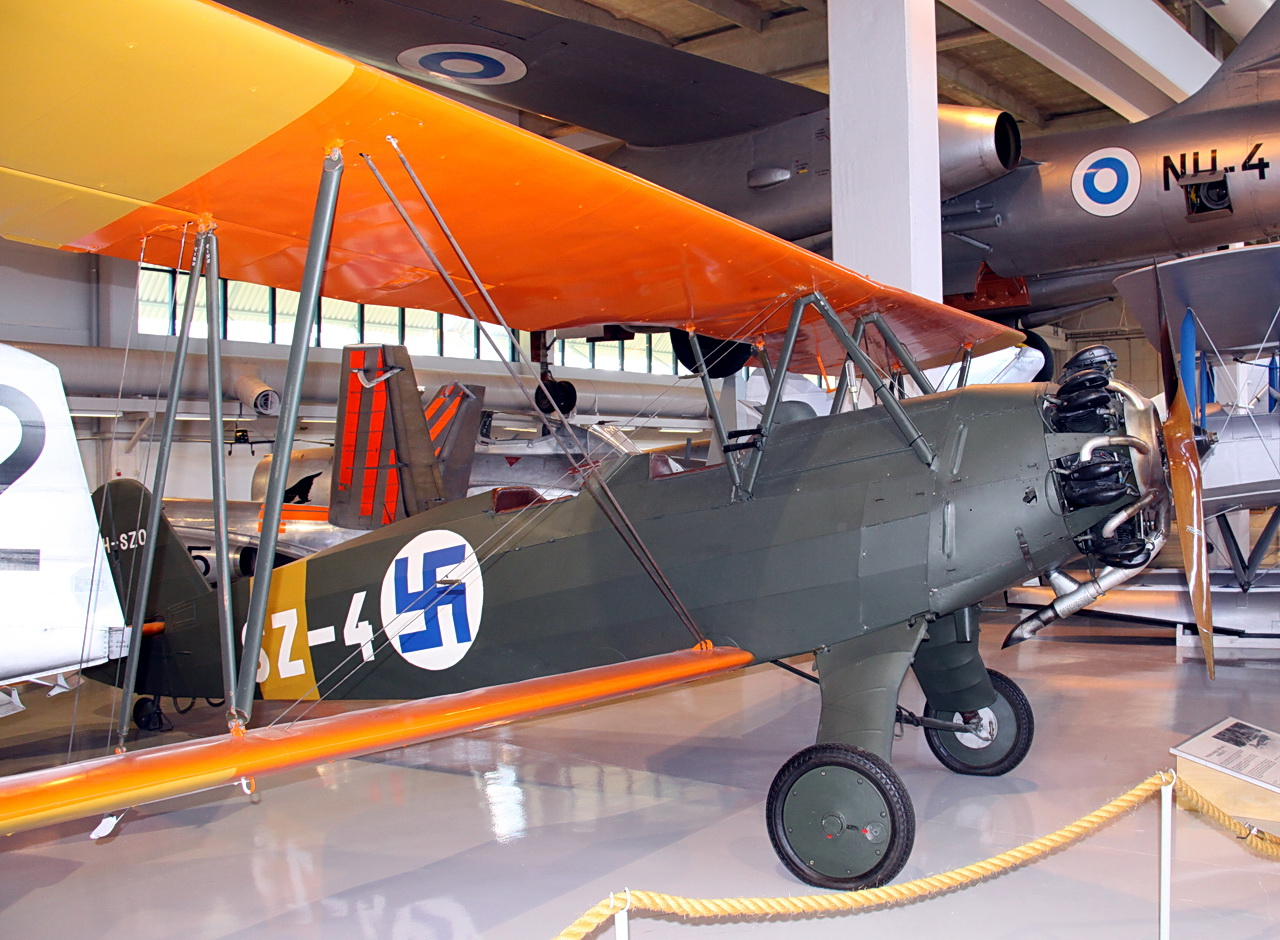
A German biplane Stieglitz in the Aviation Museum of Central Finland

=== Museums ===
The Alvar Aalto Museum and the Museum of Central Finland form a center of culture in the immediate vicinity of the historical campus of the University of Jyväskylä. Both museums are designed by functionalist Alvar Aalto. The Alvar Aalto Museum displays the artist's most important work and design. The Museum of Central Finland specializes in cultural history. It serves both as the town museum of Jyväskylä and the provincial museum of Central Finland. In summer 2015 Alvar Aalto Foundation and the city of Jyväskylä launched an architect competition to connect the two museums.

One of architect Aalto's most significant works, Säynätsalo Town Hall, is located in Säynätsalo island.

The city hosts the Craft Museum of Finland, which presents a range of different handicraft techniques from across the country, as well as a centre dedicated to the conservation of textiles that serves private customers, museums and organisations. The National Costume Center of Finland forms a part of the museum.

The Aviation Museum of Central Finland near the Jyväskylä Airport in Tikkakoski exhibits the aviation history of Finland.

The University of Jyväskylä Museum is specialized in the history of the university and diversity of nature in Central Finland.

Jyväskylä Art Museum, located the city centre is the regional art museum of Central Finland. In collaboration with the Centre for Creative Photography, the Jyväskylä Art Museum maintains The Ratamo Printmaking and Photography Centre. This centre consists of the Galleria Ratamo along with a printmaking workshop, photography studio and artist workspaces all situated in Jyväskylä's former roundhouse.

In addition, historical churches in the city are open for public, most notables of them being the Taulumäki Church and the Jyväskylä City Church.

=== Theaters ===
The biggest theater in the city is the Jyväskylä City Theatre, designed by Alvar Aalto. It stands right in the center of the city.

In addition to the City Theatre, more than dozen amateur drama companies serve audiences of all ages. The most popular theatres include:

- Huoneteatteri (The Room Theatre), Sammonkatu 4
- Jyväskylä University Student Theatre, Student Union Building, Keskussairaalantie 2
- Jyväskylän kansannäyttämö, Sammonkatu 7
- AdAstra Theatre, Koskenharjuntie 8
- Teatterikone, Köhniönkatu 31
- Jyväskylän teatteriyhdistys Kulissi, Siltakatu 25
- Improvisaatioteatteri Ässiä Hatusta, University Campus, Student Union Building, Keskussairaalantie 2

=== Music ===
In the 2010s, Jyväskylä earned a reputation as one of the most productive and high-quality rap music centers, and Jyväskylä has been titled in the media as the "capital of Finnish rap". Gettomasa, among others, are rap artists from Jyväskylä who deserved their encouragement.

=== Annual events ===
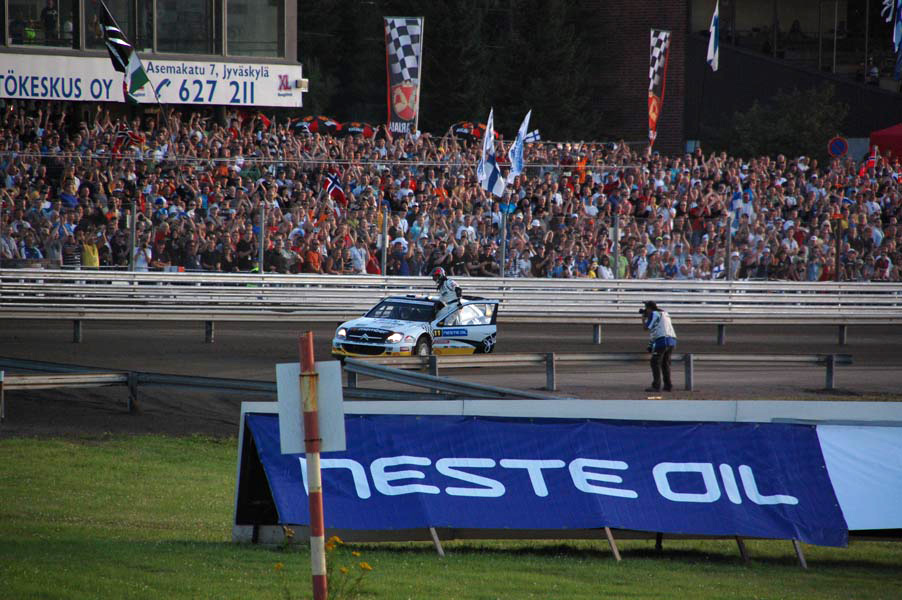
Petter Solberg on the Killeri super special stage of the Rally Finland

- Arctic and Fabulous Film Festival offers different forms and genres of Nordic film in the middle of most freezing winter season in February.
- Jyväskylä City's Birthday Week (last week of March) offers a number of concerts, theatre, exhibitions and debates around the city.
- Jyrock in April is an indie and alternative rock and pop festival.
- Lutakko liekeissä in August is a rock festival held in rock club Tanssisali Lutakko.
- Yläkaupungin Yö in May is one of the biggest annual street festivals of the city.
- Sataman Yö is an annual pop music festival organised one week before the midsummer in the harbour of Jyväskylä.
- Jyväskylä Arts Festival in the middle of July accommodates musicians, bands, contemporary circus, comedians, mimes, physical theatre, storytellers and film makers. It is one of the most well known festivals in Finland.
- Neste Oil Rally Finland in the end of July is the biggest annually organised event in Nordic countries and a part of the WRC World Rally Championships.
- Athenis Finlandiae organised in August is a cultural festival combining elements from ancient history, arts and science.
- Finlandia Marathon in the beginning of September is a marathon festival designed for everybody from a top athlete to an amateur jogger.
- Time of Dance – the largest annual festival of Finnish contemporary dance is taking place in the end of September.
- The International Print Triennial Graphica Creativa is organised every three years since 1975. It was the very first international graphic art exhibition in Finland. The latest triennial was organised in 2012.

=== Media ===
The Finnish daily newspaper Keskisuomalainen has been printed in Jyväskylä since 1871.

The world of Last Drop, an open-world action-adventure video game from Jyväskylä-based game development company Lohkare Games, is based on the city architecture of Jyväskylä; the suburb serving as the game's primary core area draws inspiration from the Kangaslampi suburb.

== Sports ==
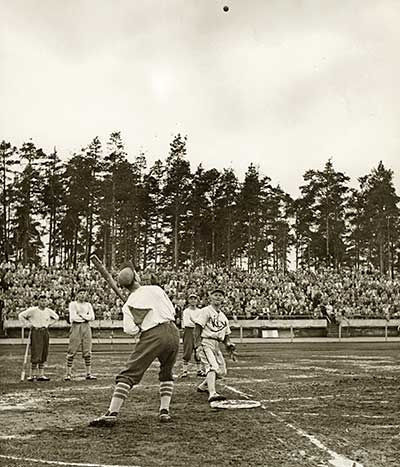
Eino Kaakkolahti passing during a pesäpallo (Finnish baseball) match in 1958

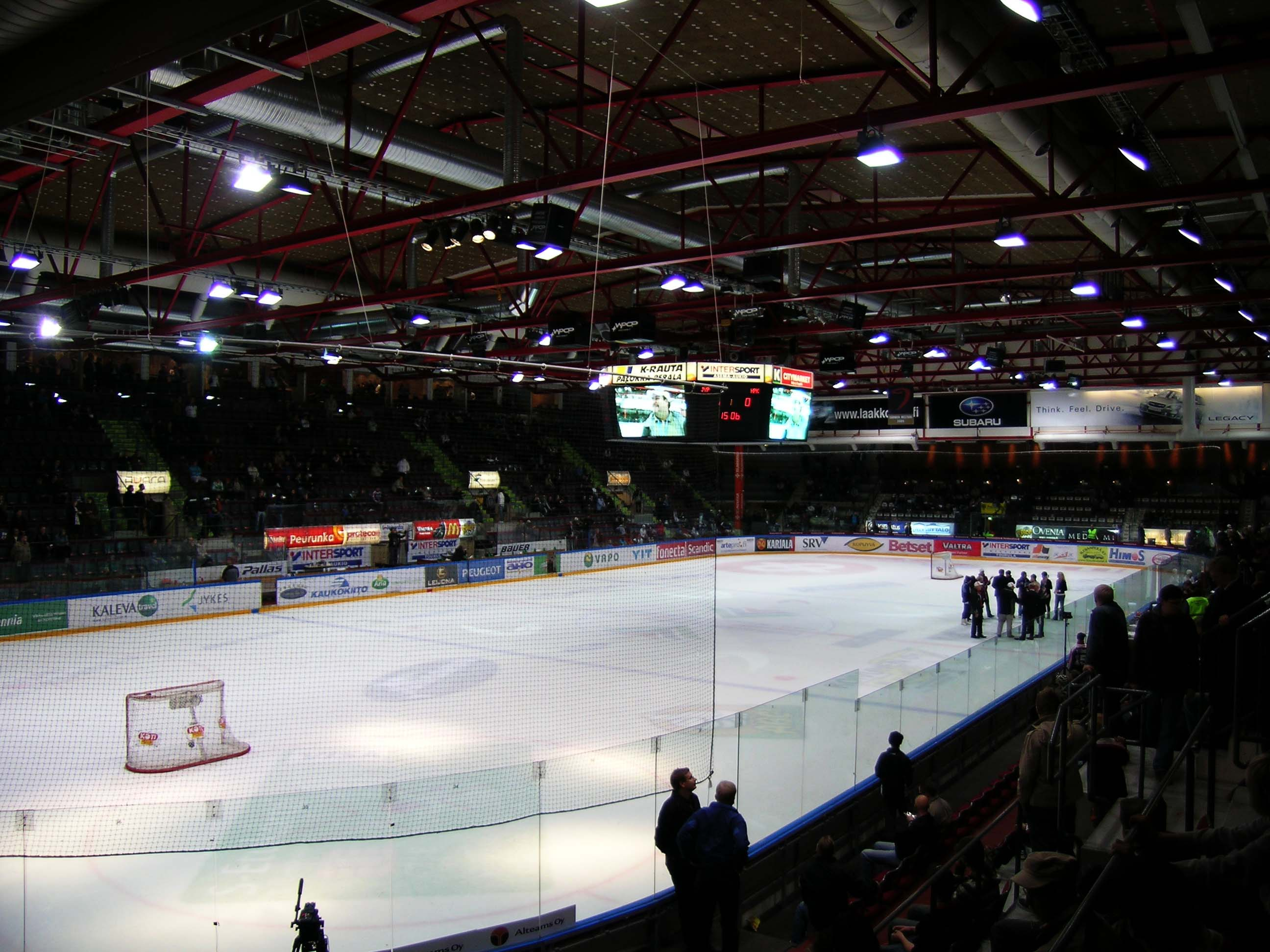
Synergia-areena is the main ice hockey venue.

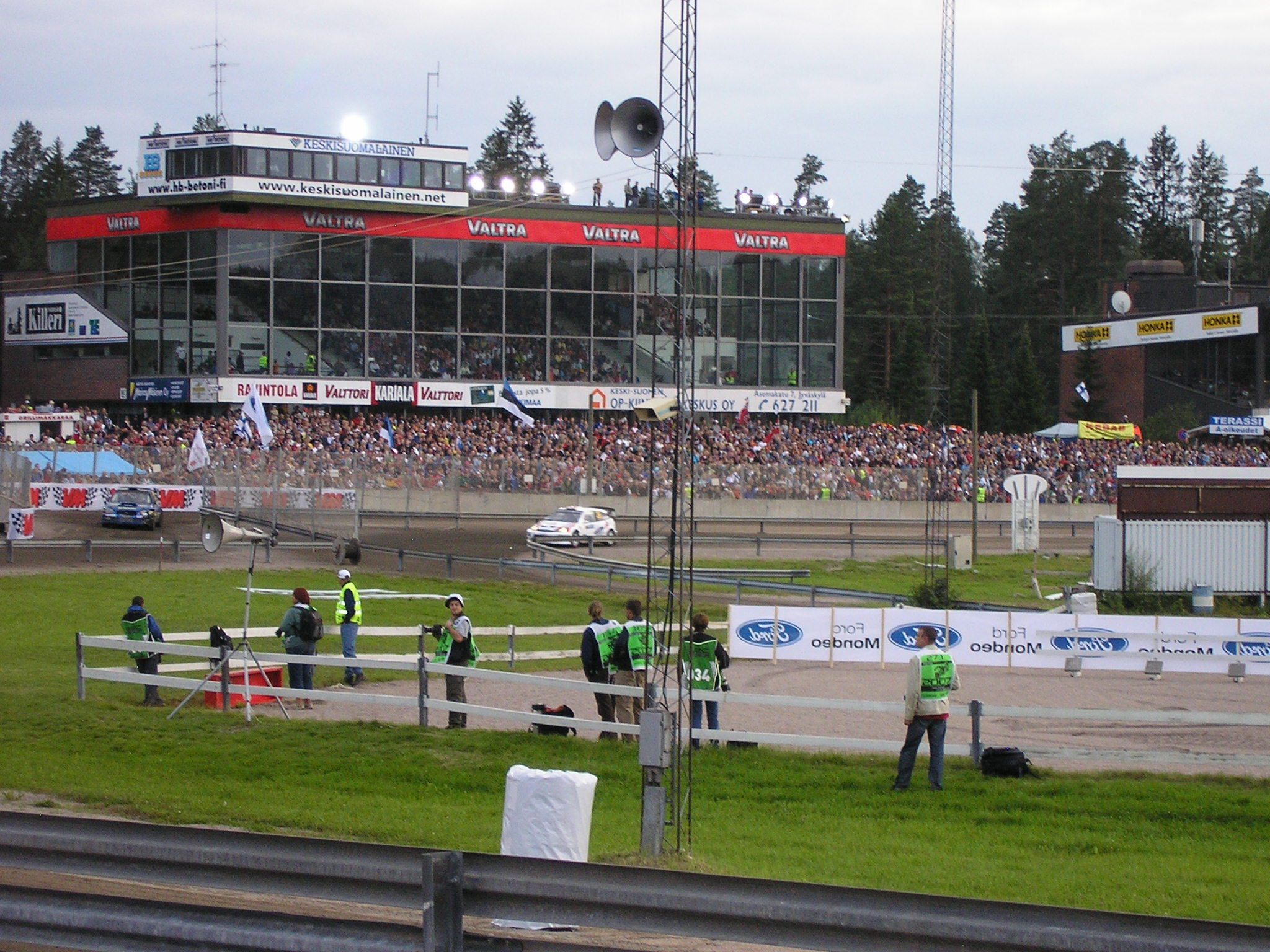
Killeri harness racing track

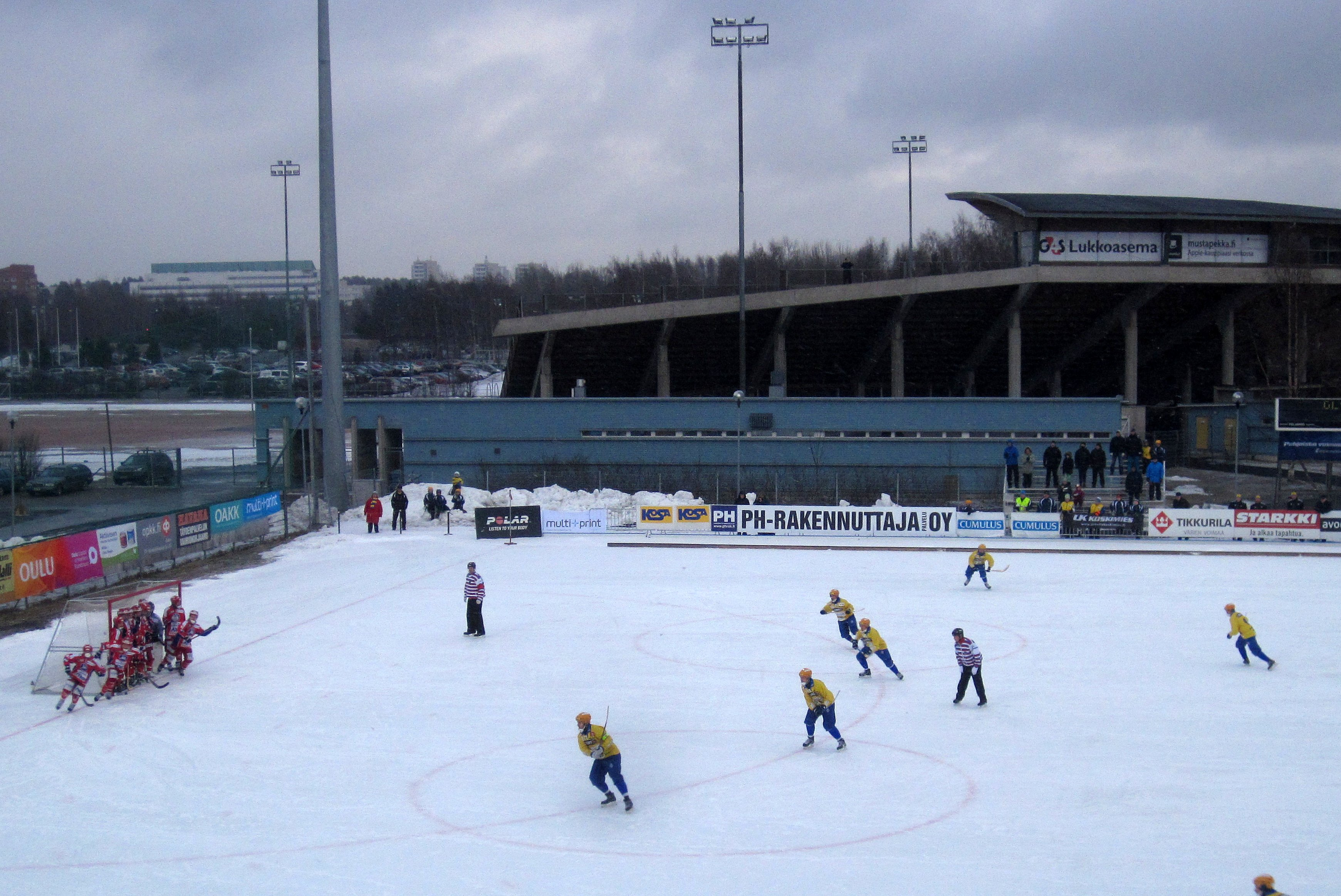
Jyväskylän Seudun Palloseura won the national bandy title in 2019. Here in the 2014 final.

The University of Jyväskylä is the only university in Northern Europe with a faculty of sports. The faculty has been a key player to develop a strong sports culture in the city, which is why Jyväskylä is also dubbed the "capital of Finnish sport".

The city hosts the Secto Rally Finland (formerly known as the 1000 Lakes Rally). It is the biggest annually organised public event in the Nordic countries, gathering over 500,000 spectators every year. The rally has been held since 1951, first as a national competition, then from 1959 on as a European Rally Championship event and since the introduction of the World Rally Championship in 1973, as Finland's WRC event.

Ice hockey venue Synergia-areena, Hippos Finnish baseball stadium, swimming hall AaltoAlvari, and many other primary sport venues of the city are located in Hippos, two kilometres (1.2 miles) away from the city centre. The Matti Nykänen ski jumping hill is located next to the Laajavuori ski resort just few kilometres west from the city centre. The main football stadium lies on the slopes of Harju just next to the city centre. The Killeri hippodrome on the western parts of the city serves different horse racing competitions. At winter time, amateur ice skaters can practice their skills in Viitaniemi or on the lake Jyväsjärvi, which has a 3.5 km (2.2 mi) long ice skating track.

The inventor of Finnish national sport pesäpallo, Lauri "Tahko" Pihkala, studied and lived in Jyväskylä. The Upper secondary school of Jyväskylän Lyseo hosted the historic event of first pesäpallo match in world in September 1920.

Sports teams from Jyväskylä include:

- JYP plays in the top-tier Finnish men's ice hockey league, SM-liiga. The team was the 2009 and 2012 Finnish Champion. The team also won the European Trophy in 2013 and the European Champions Hockey League tournament in 2018.
- JYP Naiset is a three-time Finnish Champion of the Naisten Liiga, the top-tier Finnish women's ice hockey league. As of 2021, the team plays in the second-tier Naisten Mestis.
- JyPK (Jyväskylän Pallokerho) plays in the Kansallinen Liiga, the premier division of Finnish women's football.
- FC Vaajakoski plays in Kakkonen, the third tier of the men's Finnish football league system.
- FC Blackbird and Jyväskylän Jalkapalloklubi (JJK Jyväskylä) play in Kolmonen, the fourth tier of the men's Finnish football league system. JJK played in the premier division Veikkausliiga in 2017.
- Jyväskylän Seudun Palloseura (JPS) plays in the highest bandy division, Bandyliiga, and won the Finnish Championship for the first time in 2019. Their home arena is the Vehkalammen kenttä.
- Jyväskylä Track and Field Club (JKU) is one of the leading track and field clubs in Finland.
- Jyväskylän Kiri is the most successful men's pesäpallo team in history. Currently they play in the top division Superpesis.
- Jyväskylän Saukot plays in the Finnish men's women's water polo top division.
- Kampuksen Dynamo (KaDy) plays futsal in the Finnish top league.
- Kirittäret holds fourteen Finnish Championships in women's pesäpallo and plays in the Superpesis.
- Jyväskylän seudun Jaguaarit plays in the Finnish third-tier American football league, the Amerikkalaisen jalkapallon II-divisioona (2nd Division).
- Happee plays in the top-tier Finnish floorball leagues, the men's F-liiga and women's F-liiga. Men's Finnish Championship in 2014.
- Hongikon Nuorisoseuran Urheilijat (HoNsU) plays basketball in the Naisten Korisliiga, the top-tier women's league, and the men's Koripallon I-divisioona, the second-tier men's league.
- Jyväskylä Freestyle Club is the main freestyle skiing club.
- Jyväskylä Ski Club (JHS) is one of the most well known cross-country skiing, ski jumping, alpine skiing, snowboarding, Nordic combined, and biathlon clubs in Finland.
- Jyväskylän Sulkapalloseura (JySS) is the main badminton club, hosting the most northern full time coach in Finland. The club has a strong junior training focus, with successful juniors including Aapo Puhakka.
- Meloiloa Canoe Club plays canoe polo and practices whitewater slalom, canoe racing, wildwater canoeing and marathon kayaking.
- Jyväskylä Rugby Club plays rugby union (rugby) in the Finnish Championship League; former national champions.
- Jyväskylän Fight Club is the city's most successful martial arts and Brazilian Jiu-Jitsu academy.
- Jigotai is the largest martial arts club in Central Finland (judo, karate, kickboxing, tai chi, aikido, taido, etc.)
- Mukwan is a well-known Taekwondo and martial arts club in Jyväskylä since 1984.
- Liikunnan Riemu plays futsal in the Finnish top league, the Futsal-Liiga, since 2013.
- Jyväskylän Liitokiekkoilijat Ry (JyLi Ry) competes in Ultimate, Disc golf and other disc sports.
- Jaguars Spirit Athletes (JSA) is the primary cheerleading club.
- Toyota Gazoo Racing WRT, the official Toyota world rally team run by 4-time world champion and Jyväskylä native Tommi Mäkinen.
- Jyväskylä Muay Thai is a well known boxing and muay thai club in Jyväskylä.

The city hosted the 2006 FIBA Europe Under-16 Championship for Women Division B.

== Government ==
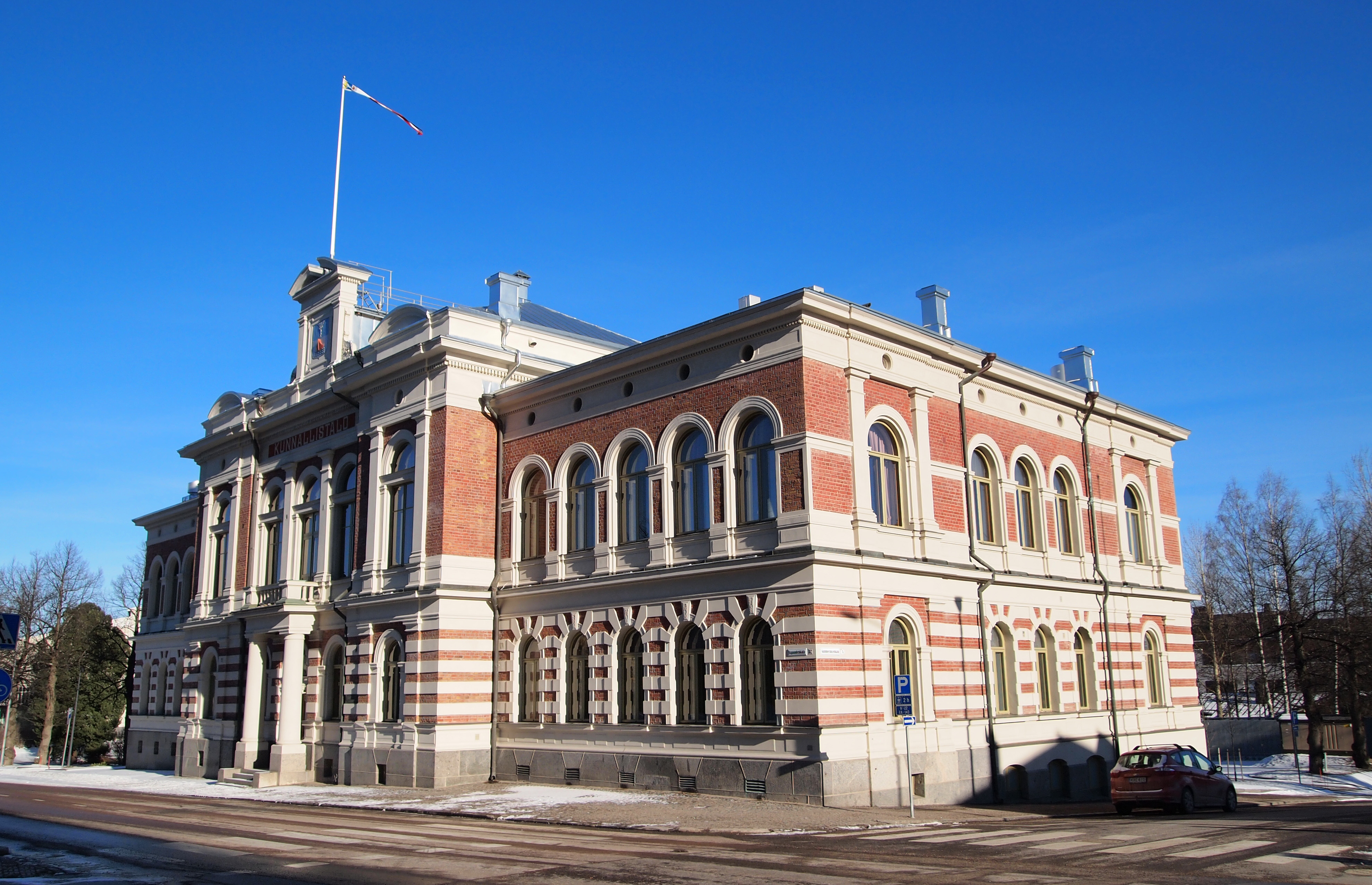
The Jyväskylä City Hall

The city council of Jyväskylä is the main decision-making body at the local level. Its 75 members are elected every fourth year in municipal elections. The city council elects the mayor. The current mayor is Timo Koivisto.

=== Seat distribution in the city council ===
Party	Seats 2021	2021	2017	2012	2008	2004	2000	1996	1992	1988	1984	1980	1976
Social Democrats	13	19,1%	19,3%	24,1%	26,6%	29,9%	31,9%	33,7%	35,8%	33,3%	32,4%	33,0%	33,1%
National Coalition Party	13	18,3%	17,4%	18,6%	21,0%	20,0%	20,6%	22,9%	20,0%	25,7%	25,4%	25,7%	23,8%
Green League	12	17,4%	19,9%	11,1%	11,7%	11,5%	11,4%	10,3%	10,0%	2,8%	3,7%	-	-
Centre Party	9	13,6%	15,9%	17,0%	19,1%	19,1%	17,3%	13,3%	10,2%	12,1%	12,1%	9,7%	7,0%
Left Alliance	7	9,8%	10,1%	9,2%	8,5%	9,0%	9,6%	11,0%	13,3%	15,7%	16,5%	19,8%	22,1%
True Finns	9	12,9%	8,1%	11,6%	4,5%	0,3%	-	-	2,8%	4,2%	4,8%	1,1%	1,1%
Christian Democrats	4	5,7%	6,4%	5,7%	5,8%	6,3%	6,9%	7,1%	5,2%	4,0%	4,3%	5,4%	5,6%
Communist Party	0	2,2%	0,7%	1,2%	1,8%	2,4%	3,5%	1,9%	-	-	-	-	-
Swedish People's Party	0	0,3%	0,1%	0,0%	0,2%	0,2%	0,2%	0,3%	0,4%	0,6%	0,6%	0,6%	-
Pirate Party	0	-	1,4%	0,8%	-	-	-	-	-	-	-	-	-
Others	0	3,3%	0,2%	0,2%	0,1%	0,1%	0,2%	1,5%	2,3%	1,7%	0,1%	4,7%	7,3%

The prevalence of the social democratic party can be explained in part by the Vaajakoski, a major industrial center historically that is currently part of Jyväskylä, and its heritage of industrial workers voting social democrats.

Jyväskylä was the only place during the 2017 municipal elections where the Green League was the largest party.

=== Administrative division ===
The city of Jyväskylä is divided into fourteen wards (suuralueet; storområden), which are further divided into 89 districts. The ward division does not always follow district boundaries.

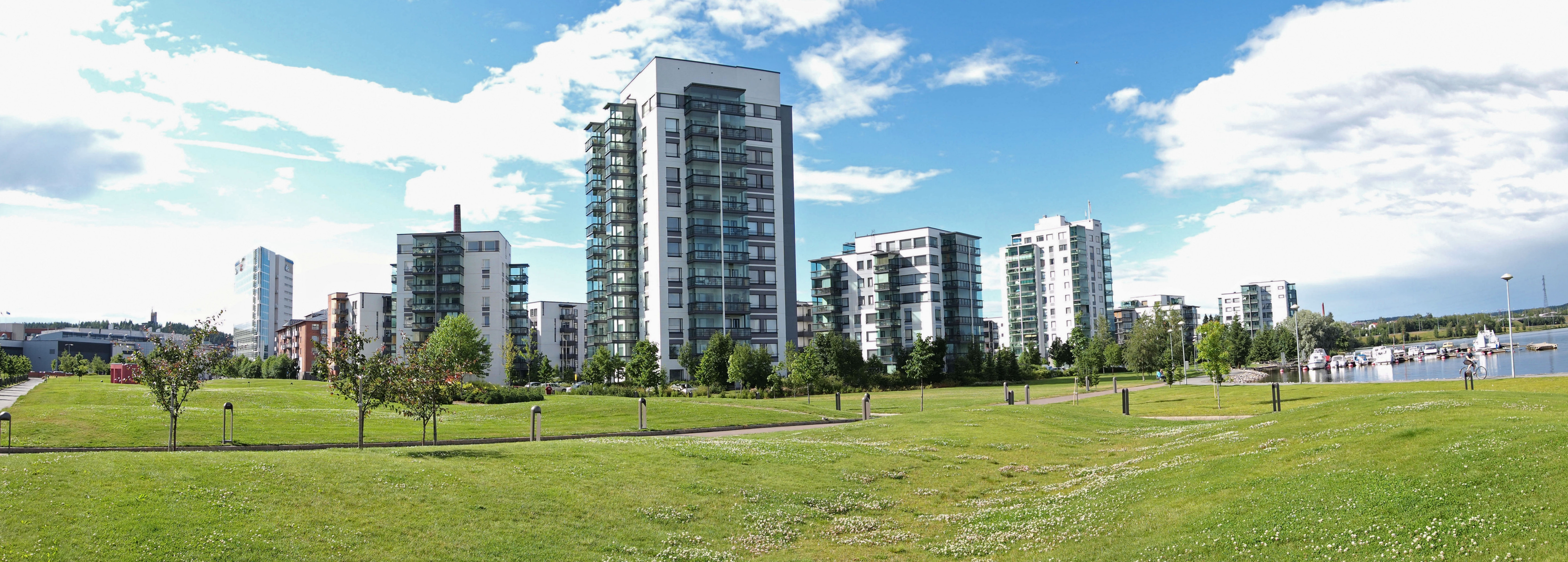
Lutakko is a neighbourhood close to the city centre.

The following is a listing of the 14 wards of Jyväskylä by population, as of November 2010

1. Kantakaupunki (city centre), population 25,149
2. Kuokkala, population 16,904
3. Vaajakoski-Jyskä, population 14,588
4. Palokka-Puuppola, population 14,395
5. Kypärämäki-Kortepohja, population 10,537
6. Huhtasuo, population 8,691
7. Keltinmäki-Myllyjärvi, population 7,524
8. Keljo, population 5,494
9. Halssila, population 5,479
10. Tikkakoski-Nyrölä, population 5,401
11. Korpilahti, population 4,993
12. Lohikoski-Seppälänkangas, population 4,650
13. Säynätsalo, population 3,340
14. Kuohu-Vesanka, population 2,118

== Cityscape ==
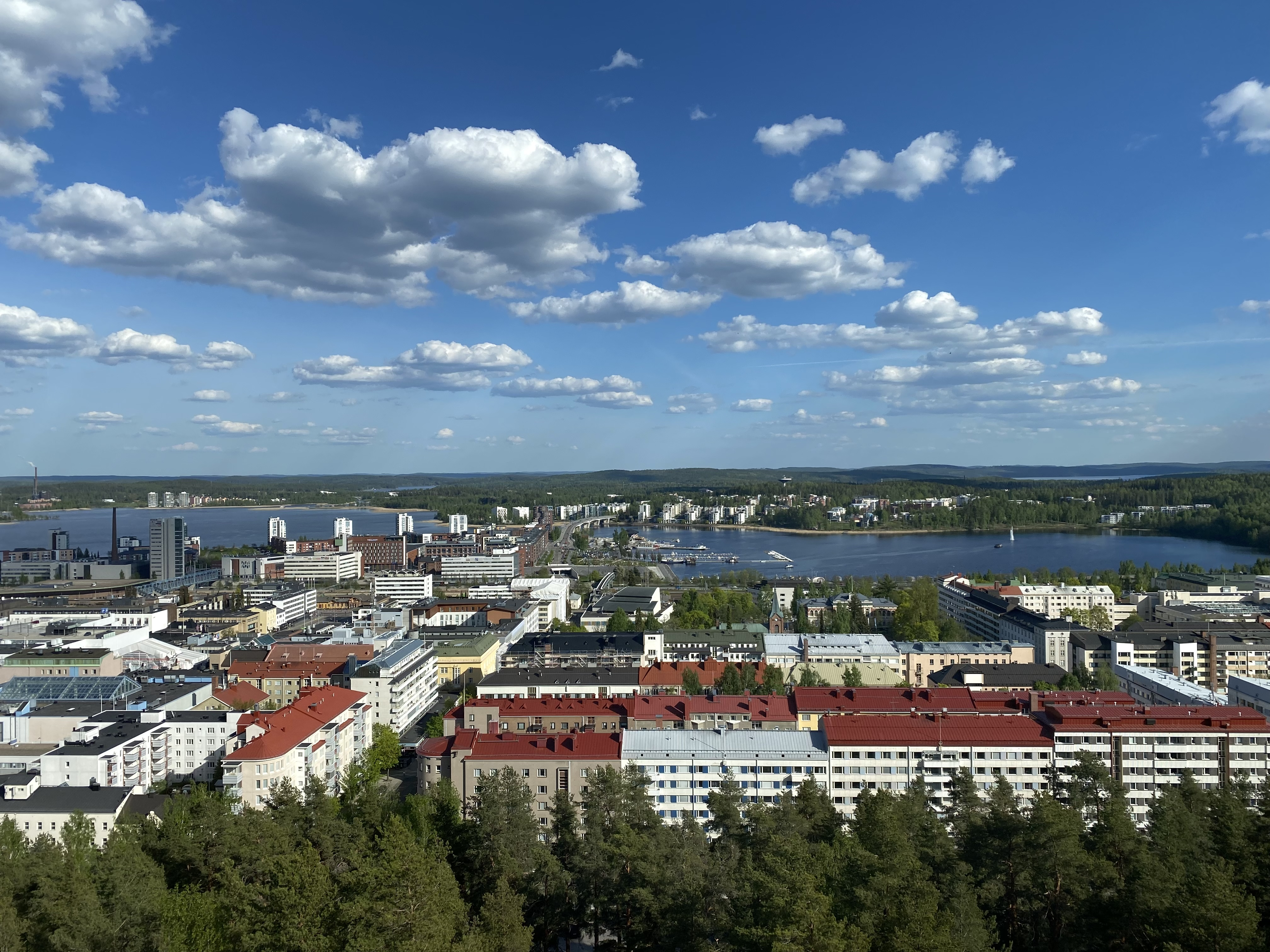
Summer view from Harju

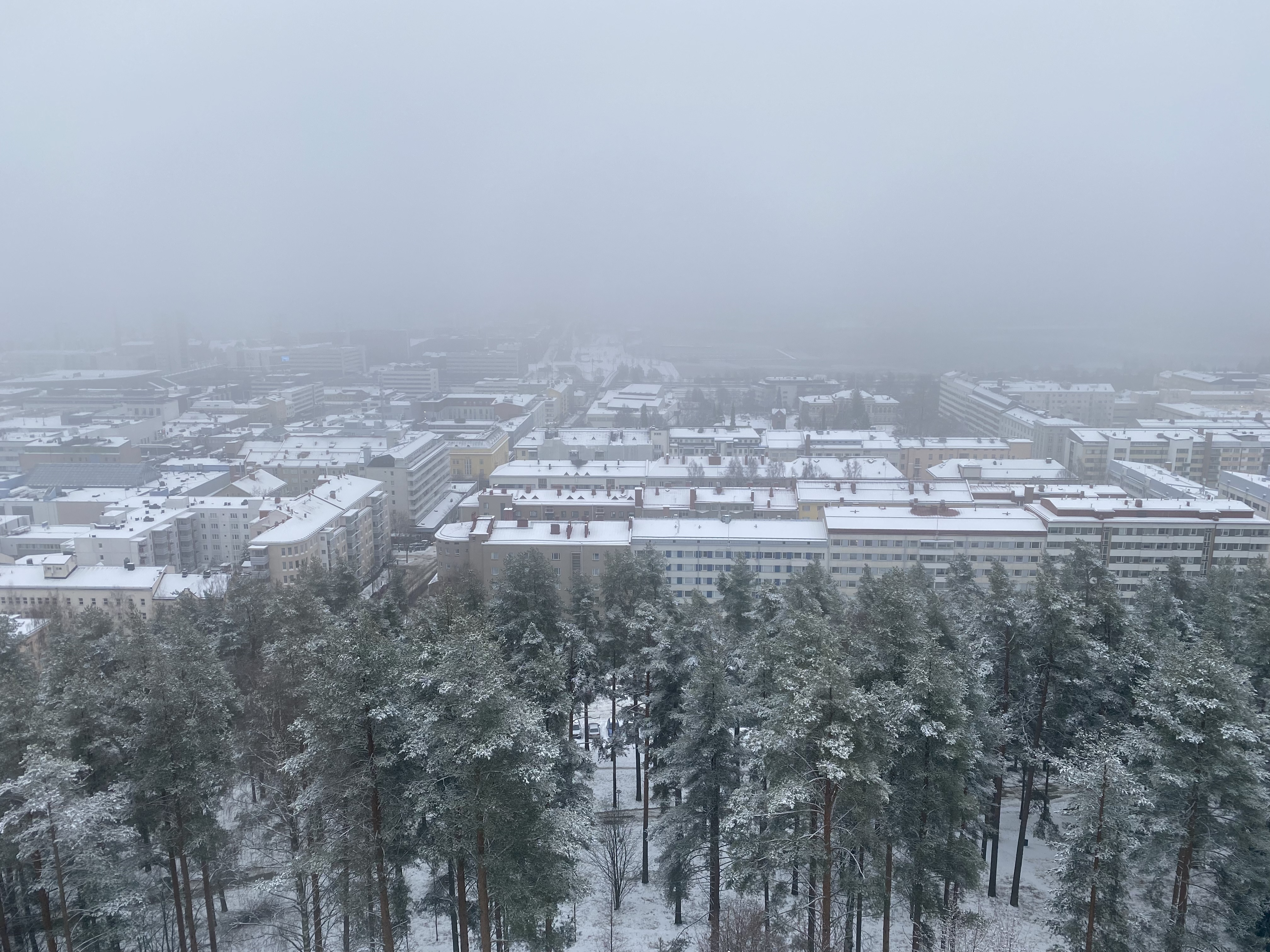
Winter view from Harju

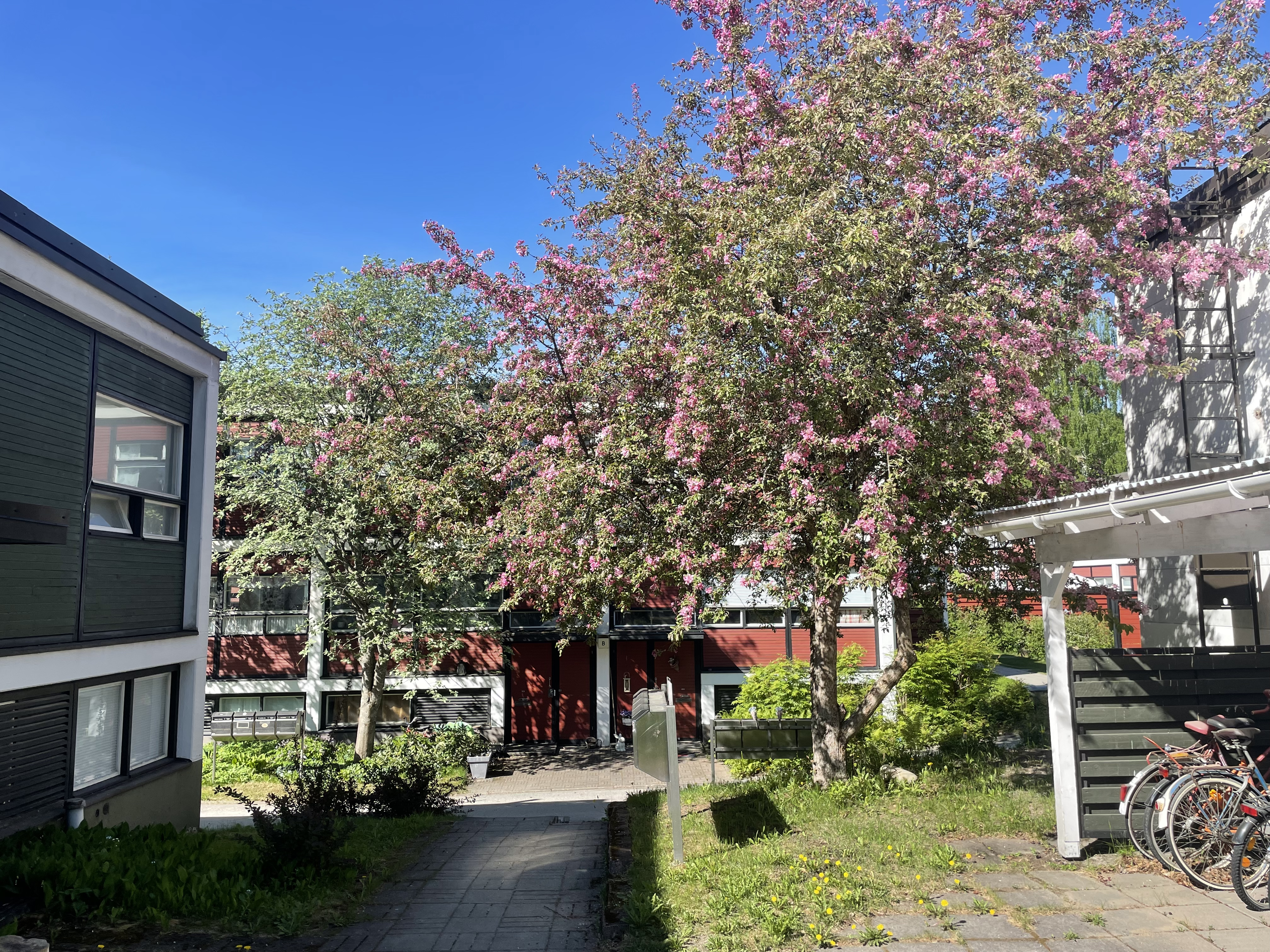
The Kortepohja residential area, showcasing historic 1960s architecture

Jyväskylä was founded in the northern end of the lake Päijänne at the crossroads of three major waterways. Lakes control the cityscape. The city grid plan from 1833 by Jacob Leonard Boringh can be well recognised in the city center. Nevertheless, due to very rapid population growth, the cityscape has gone through one of the most massive changes in all of Finland.

The city features a notable amount of modern architecture, including more buildings designed by functionalist architect Alvar Aalto than any other city in the world.

The establishment of schools in the 1850s and 1860s proved to be the most important step from the point of view of the later development of Jyväskylä. The headquarters of the University of Jyväskylä are considered to be Aalto's masterpieces. Later, a modern architect Arto Sipinen, a pupil of Aalto, has influenced the cityscape since the 1970s by designing most of the new university buildings in the city.

The outskirts of the city are mainly populated by student apartments and single-family houses. Some of the most important buildings, like Säynätsalo Town Hall, designed by Aalto are located outside the city centre in Säynätsalo and Muuratsalo. Three of the 13 sites in the Aalto Works series are in Jyväskylä: Säynätsalo Town Hall, the Muuratsalo Experimental House and the Aalto campus of the university. The series was added to the UNESCO World Heritage List on 26 July 2026.

Consolidated areas Korpilahti, Jyväskylän maalaiskunta, Säynätsalo and also western parts of Jyväskylä are mainly countryside dominated by hilly forests and lakes.

Schauman Mansion, a historic red-brick castle-like building, adds to Jyväskylä's architectural heritage. Originally built in the early 20th century as the headquarters for the Schauman plywood factory, it now serves as a landmark of the city's industrial past. Located near Lutakko, the building stands in contrast to Jyväskylä's modern skyline, reflecting the city's blend of old and new architecture.

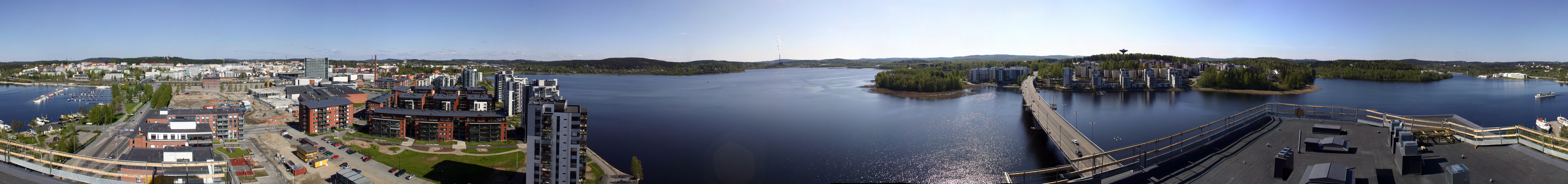
A 360 degree panorama of Jyväskylä taken from the Horisontti building. From left to right: Lutakko with the city centre and Harju in the background, lake Jyväsjärvi, Kuokkala bridge with Kuokkala neighbourhood and Kuokkala water tower in the background, and Ylistönrinne campus.

== Transport ==
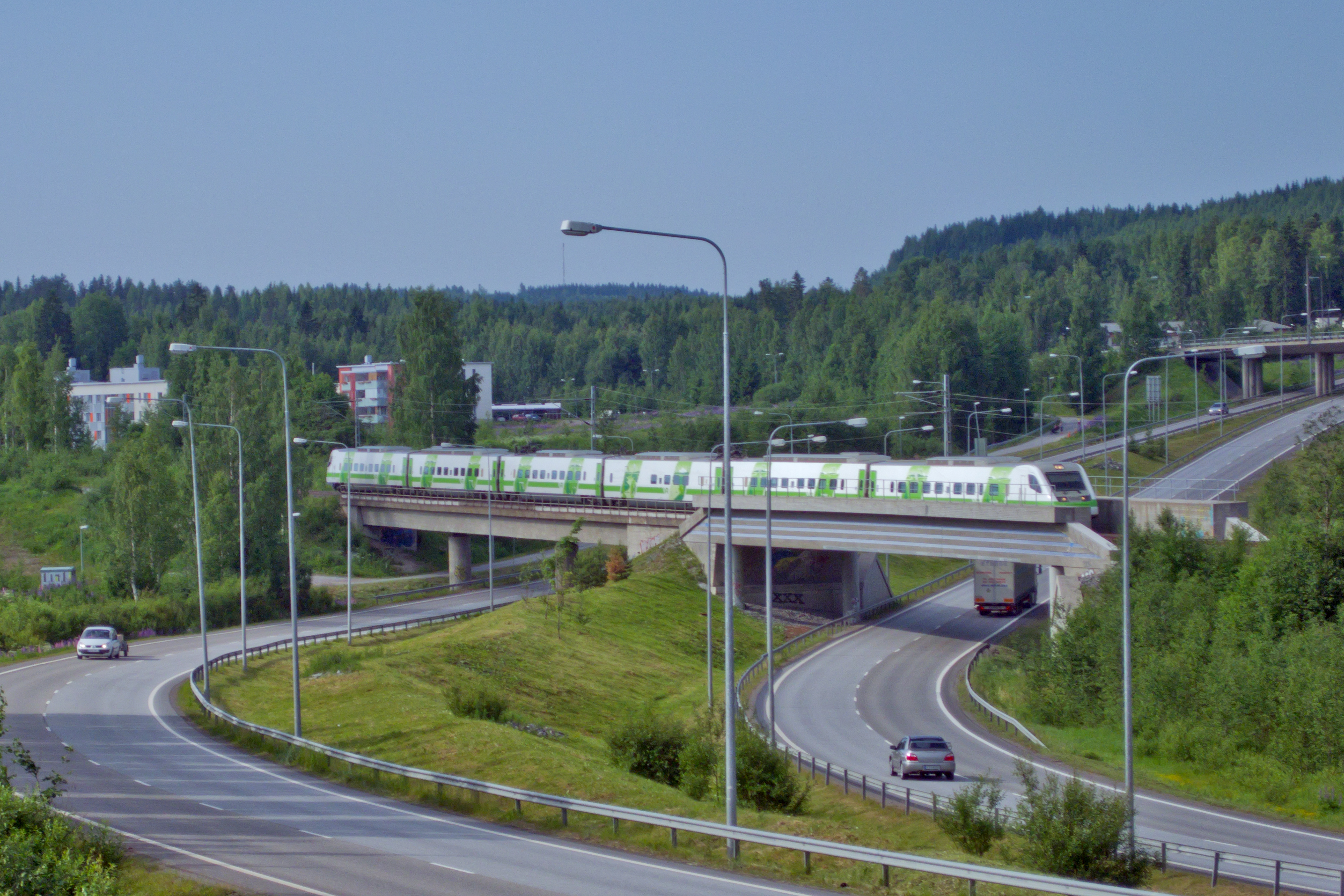
S81 passing Pumperinmäki at Jyväskylä. Jyväskylä is in the crossroads of main road and railway networks.

Jyväskylä railway station is served by VR direct trains to Helsinki, Pieksämäki, Tampere, Turku, Vaasa and many other destinations in Finland. The station was extensively modernised in 2002.

Jyväskylä Airport is situated in Tikkakoski, about 20 kilometres (12 mi) north of Jyväskylä. It has regular direct flights to Helsinki Airport. The airport serves also as a military and charter airport.

The city is on a crossroad of many main roads of Finland. Highway 4 (E75) passes the city from south to north, and Highway 9 (E63) from southeast to northwest. Highway 23 between Pori and Joensuu also runs through Jyväskylä.

Jyväskylä harbour is home to many passenger ships operating on lake Päijänne. During summer time, there are direct ship connections to Lahti, Jämsä, Suolahti, Viitasaari, and some other cities.

The public transportation system of Jyväskylä is managed by the city under the Linkki brand and operated under contract to the city by various operators. It is based on bus lines.

== Education ==
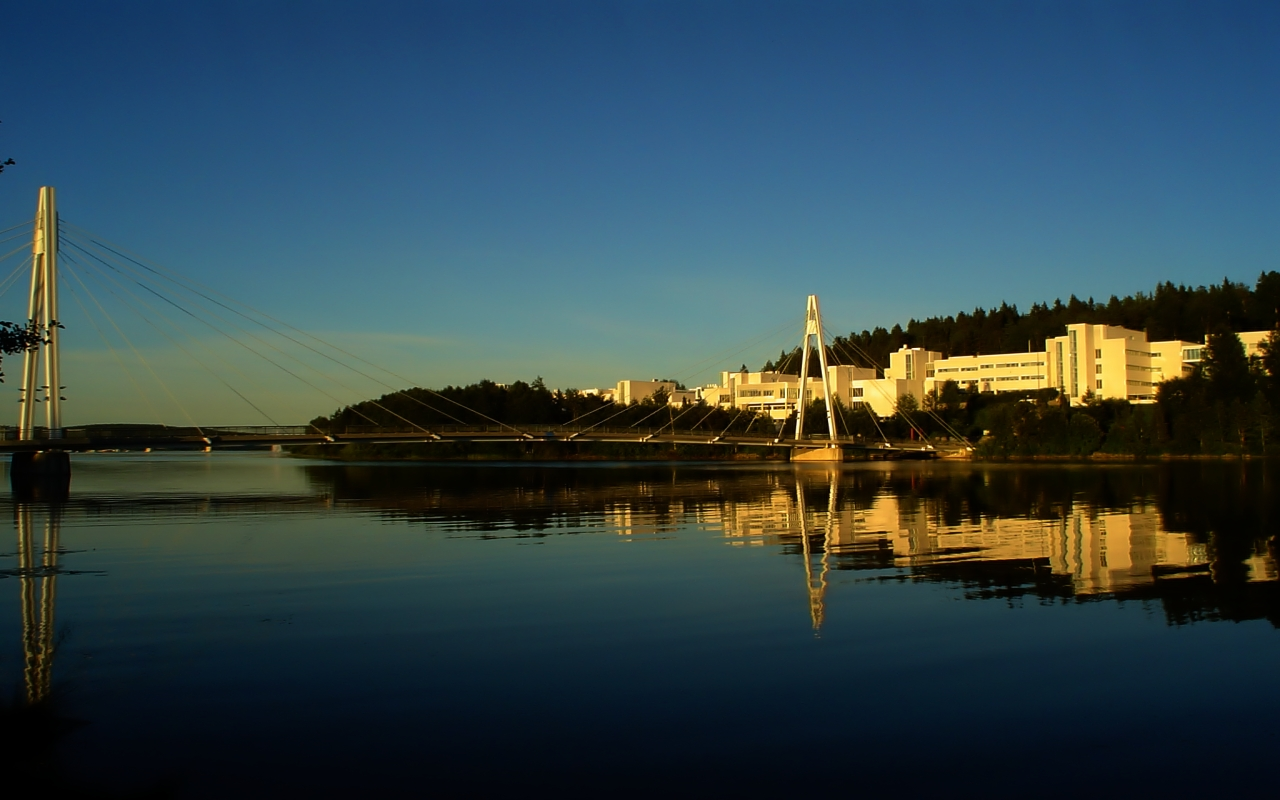
University of Jyväskylä Ylistönrinne Campus

Jyväskylä is a traditional centre of education. Including school children, and the students in high schools, vocational schools, the university of applied sciences, and the universities, the number of students and pupils in the city reaches 45,000, boosting Jyväskylä's reputation as a "student city". Over 30% of the city population are students. A number of firsts in Finnish education have taken place in Jyväskylä:

- Jyväskylä Lyceum (Finnish: Jyväskylän Lyseon lukio) is the world's first junior secondary school with Finnish as the language of instruction. It started its first term on 1 October 1858 and turned 160 years old in 2018. Lyceum still exists and is one of the three upper secondary schools in the city.
- The first Finnish-medium teacher training college (1863)
- The first Finnish-medium school for girls (1864)
- Finland's first Summer University (1912)

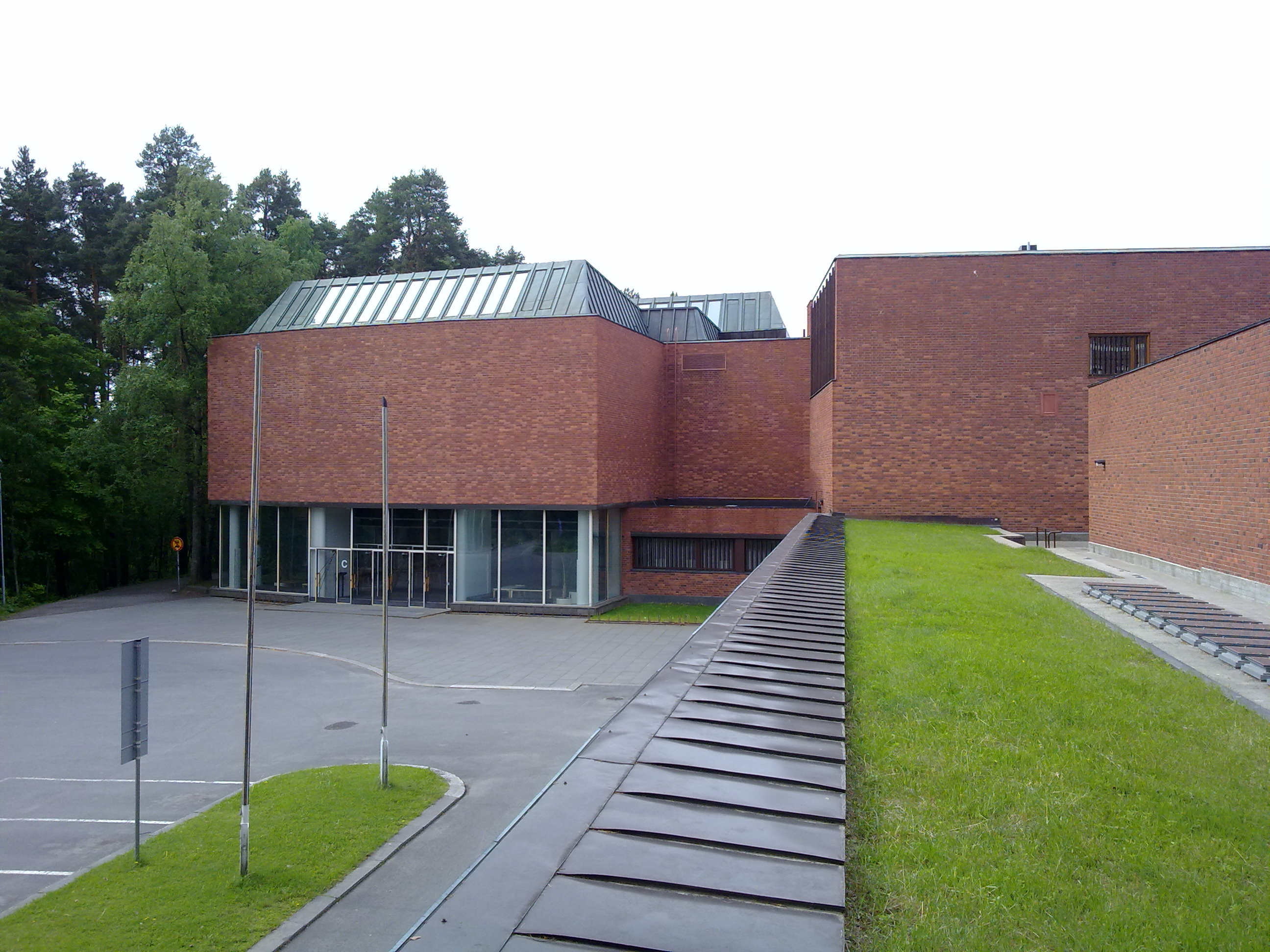
Main building of the University of Jyväskylä designed by Alvar Aalto

Due to this, among other things, the city has earned the nickname Athens of Finland. The teacher training college later evolved into the College of Education (1934) and further into the multidisciplinary University of Jyväskylä (1966).

Jyväskylä Lyceum also offers education through the International Baccalaureate Diploma Programme.

The University of Jyväskylä is one of the most popular universities in Finland. Almost 16,000 students are enrolled to study for a bachelor's or master's degree, and the university also offers PhD programs in most of its subjects. Historically, the university has excelled in the study of education, but in the last few decades it has also gained respect in the sciences. It is the only university in Finland offering university-level education in sports, training sports teachers and coaches. Today the university offers also Cyber Security degrees, in close co-operation with the Finnish Defence Forces. According to the Ministry of Employment and the Economy the city has been acknowledged in 2013 as the Cyber Security City, providing a portfolio of Cyber Security related studies and activities.

JAMK University of Applied Sciences has 8.000 students. It has four different units: School of Business and Services Management, School of Health and Social Studies, School of Technology and Teacher Education College. HUMAK University of Applied Sciences educates cultural management in Jyväskylä.

== Notable people ==
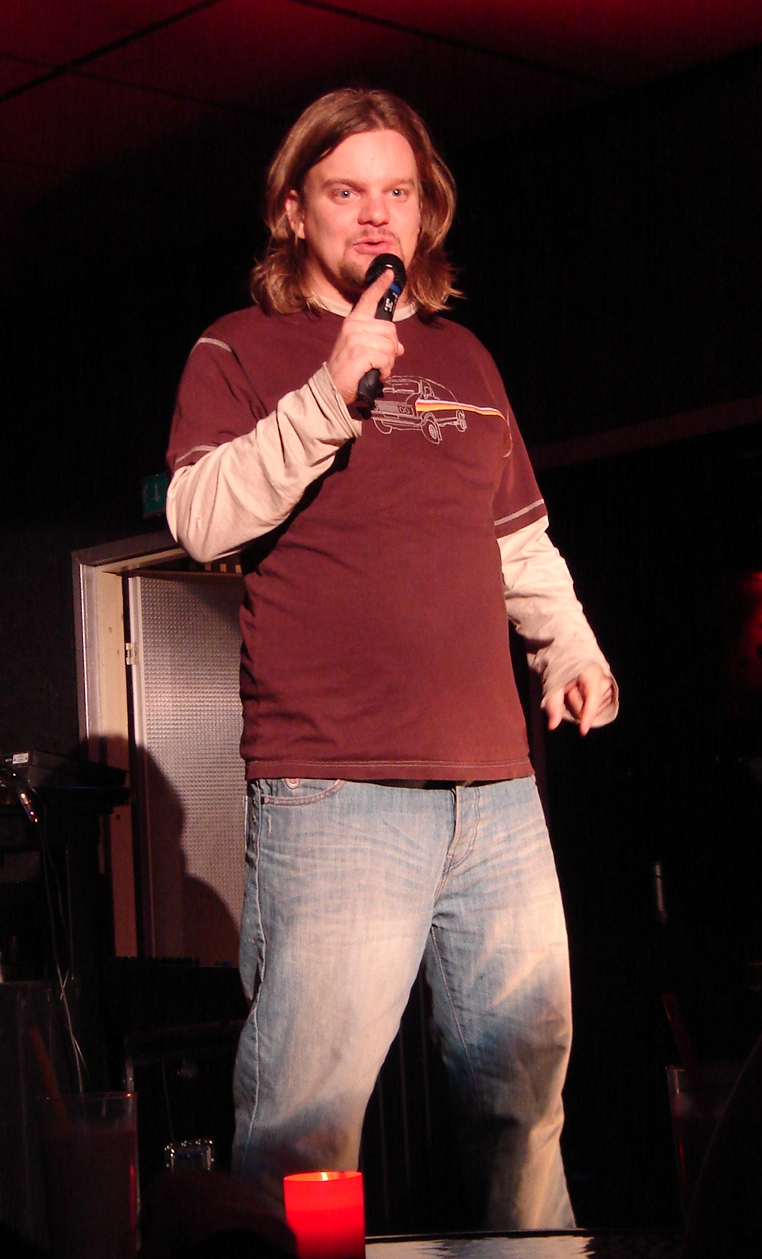
Stand-up comedian, Ismo Leikola

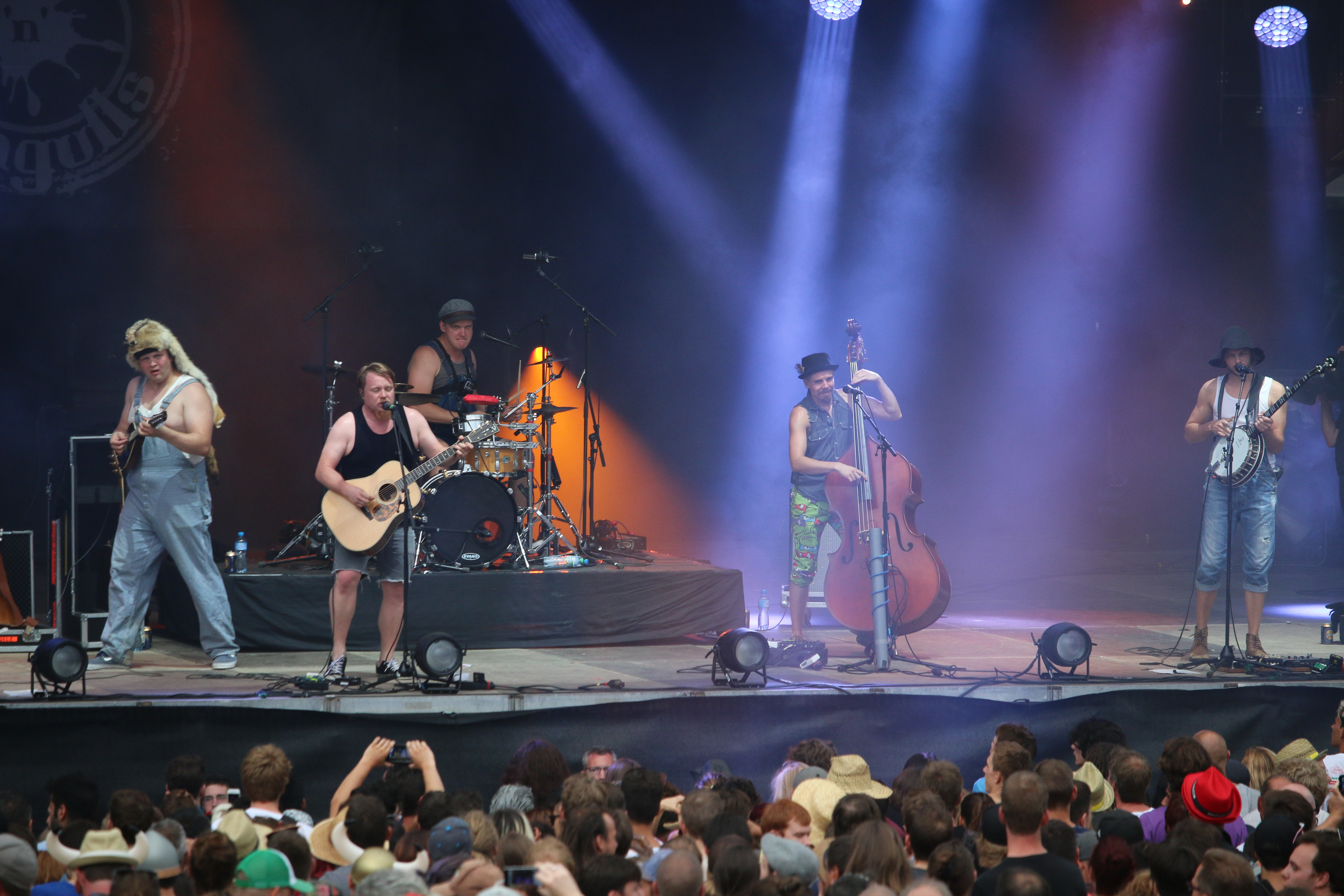
Finnish bluegrass country band, Steve 'n' Seagulls

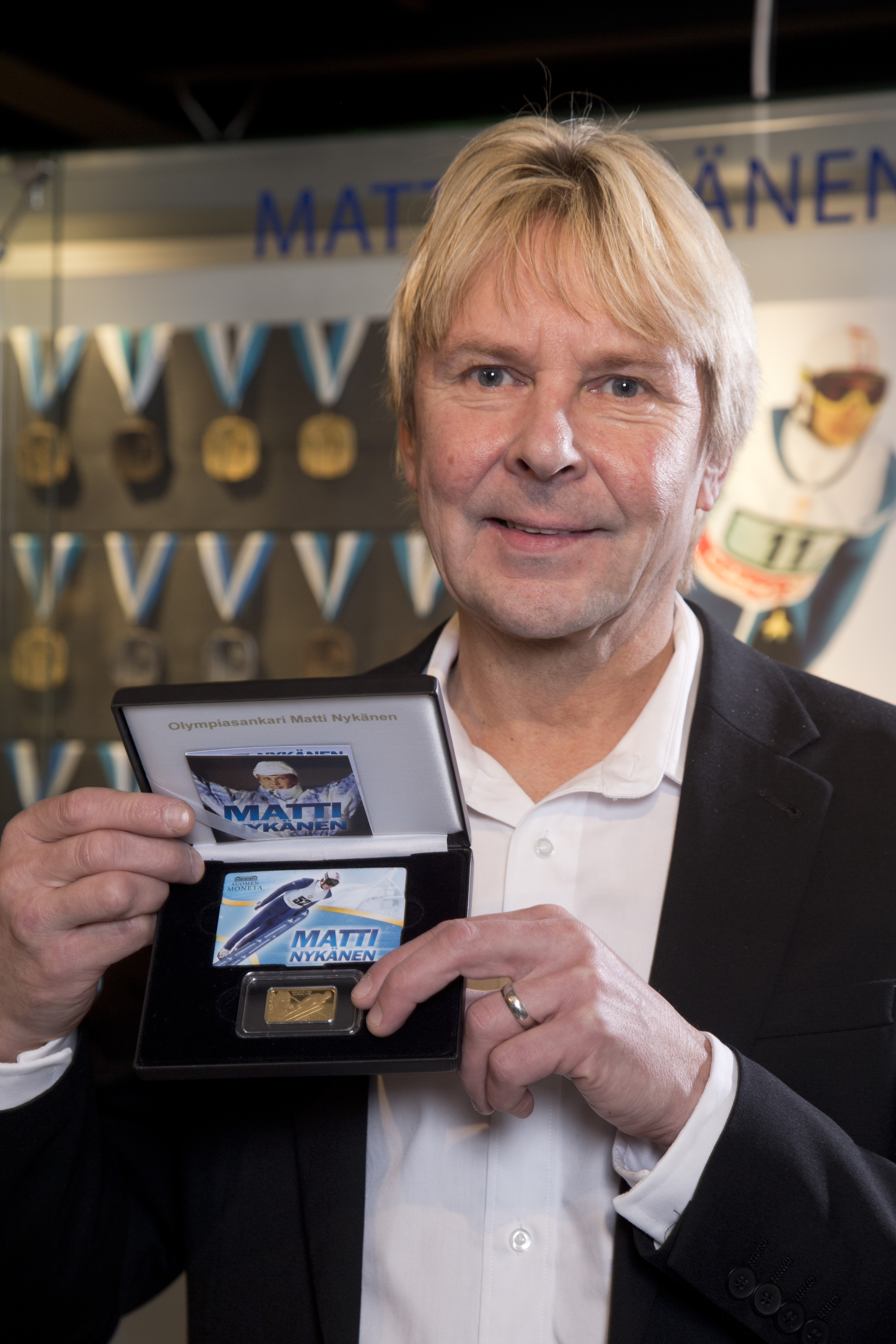
Ski jumping champion, Matti Nykänen

=== Artists ===
- Olavi Ahonen, actor
- Gettomasa, rap artist
- Ilmari Hannikainen, composer
- Pekka Hannikainen, composer
- Tauno Hannikainen, cellist, conductor
- Jonas Heiska, painter
- Arja Koriseva, singer
- Ismo Leikola, stand-up comedian
- Wivi Lönn, architect
- Pekka Kostiainen, composer and choral conductor
- Sofi Oksanen, contemporary writer
- Timo Parvela, author of juvenile fiction
- Timo Rautiainen, heavy metal singer, guitarist, songwriter
- Jack Smack, guitarist for Private Line
- Päiviö Tommila, historian, professor
- Wallu Valpio, media person
- Laura Voutilainen, pop singer

=== Engineers/Aviators ===
- Karhumäki brothers, aviation pioneers
- Aimo Lahti, weapon designer
- Eino Luukkanen, fighter ace

=== Music groups ===
- Deuteronomium, Christian metal band
- Ghost Brigade, metal band
- Rikos Records, independent record label
- Jyväskylä Sinfonia, orchestra
- Seminaarinmäen mieslaulajat, male choir
- Steve 'n' Seagulls, country band
- Swallow the Sun, melodic death metal band
- Timo Rautiainen & Trio Niskalaukaus, metal band
- Lost Society, metal band
- Excalion, melodic metal band

=== Politicians ===
- Urho Castrén, politician who served briefly as the Prime Minister of Finland in 1944
- Otto Wille Kuusinen, member of Soviet Politburo, Secretary of the Central Committee of the Communist Party of the Soviet Union
- Mauri Pekkarinen, senior centrist politician, member in four different cabinets since 1991
- Paavo Rantanen, diplomat and minister
- Alpo Rusi, diplomat and professor of international relations
- Matti Vanhanen, Prime Minister of Finland (2003–2010)
- Henna Virkkunen, Member of EU Parliament (2014–)
- Väinö Voionmaa, Senator, Minister, professor, former member of Finnish Parliament
- Hilda Tihlä, writer, social activist

=== Sports ===
- Juhana Aho, ice hockey player
- Mikko Hirvonen, rally driver
- Timo-Pekka Heikkinen, ice hockey player
- Julius Honka, ice hockey player
- Risto Jussilainen, Olympic medalist in ski jump
- Juha Kankkunen, rally driver and four-time World Rally Champion
- Mika Kohonen, floorball player
- Eero Markkanen, football player
- Lauri Markkanen, basketball player
- Tommi Mäkinen, rally driver and four-time World Rally Champion
- Olli Määttä, ice hockey player
- Matti Nykänen, four-time Olympic gold medalist in ski jump
- Lauri "Tahko" Pihkala, inventor of pesäpallo, Finnish baseball
- Sirkka Polkunen, Olympic gold medalist in cross-country skiing
- Harri Rovanperä, rally driver
- Kalle Rovanperä, rally driver and two-time World Rally Champion
- Matti Salkojärvi, footballer
- Jani Soininen, Olympic gold medalist in ski jump
- Raimo Summanen, ice hockey player and coach
- Pauli Toivonen, rally driver
- Henri Toivonen, rally driver
- Tarmo Uusivirta, boxer
- Sami Vatanen, ice hockey player

== International relations ==
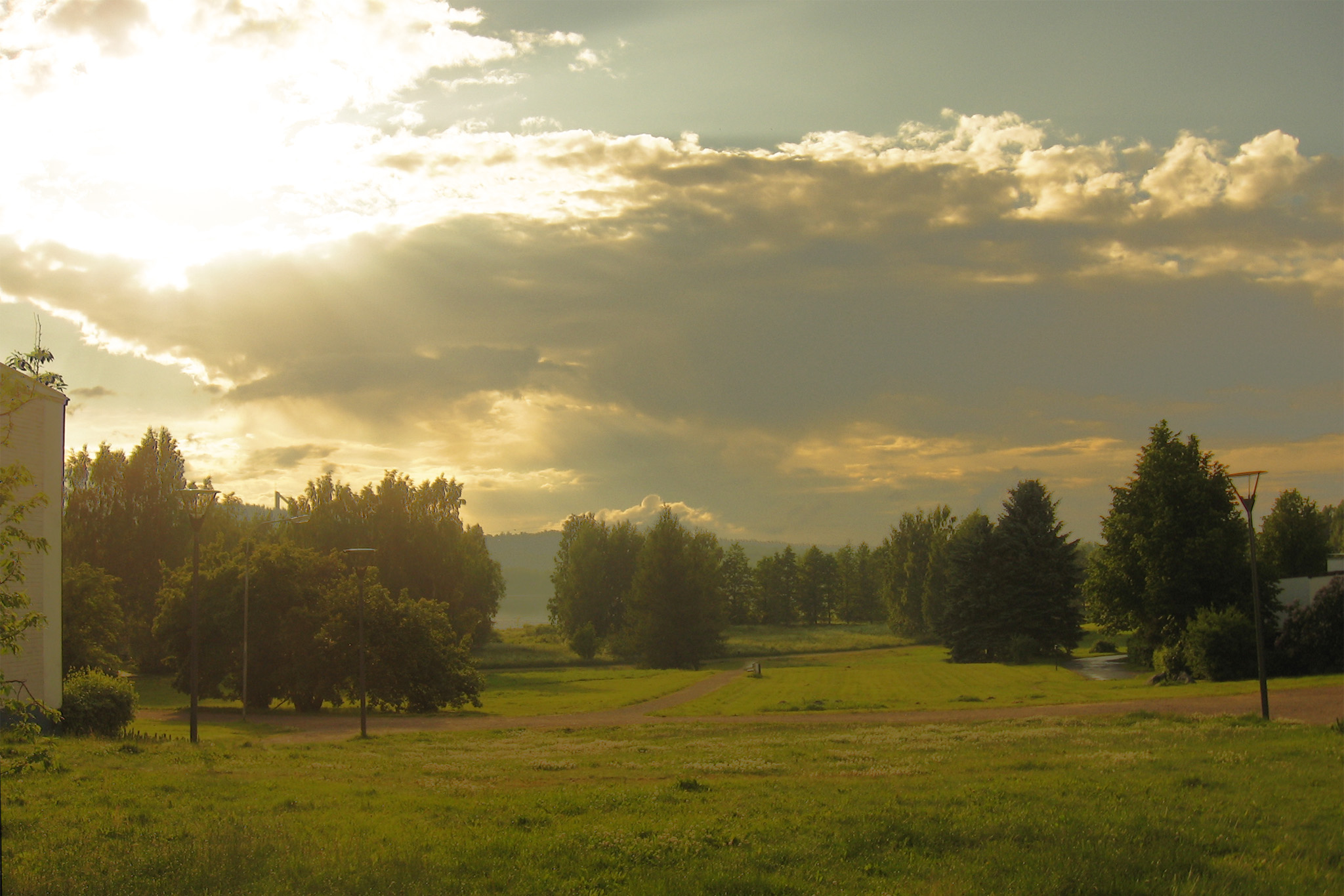
The Stavanger Park, close to the city center, is named after Jyväskylä's Norwegian twin city Stavanger.

=== Twin towns — Sister cities — Friendship cities ===
Jyväskylä is a member city of Eurotowns network and is twinned with:

Esbjerg Municipality, Denmark (1947); Eskilstuna Municipality, Sweden (1947); Debrecen, Hungary (1970); Jining, China (2018); Kunming, China (2005); Mudanjiang, China (1988); Neskaupstaður, Iceland (1958)	Niiza, Japan (1997); Potsdam, Germany (1985); Poznań, Poland (1974); Stavanger, Norway (1947); Tartu Parish, Estonia (1991); ~~Yaroslavl, Russia (1966) (Note: All cooperation with Yaroslav has been halted since March 2022 due to the Russian invasion of Ukraine.)~~

== See also ==
- Asteroid 1500 Jyväskylä (named after the town by its Finnish discoverer, Yrjö Väisälä).
- Nokkakivi Amusement Park
- St. Olaf's Church, Jyväskylä
- Vaajakoski Motorway
