= Matti Salkojärvi =

Finnish footballer (born 1984)

Personal information
- Date of birth: 10 March 1984 (age 42)
- Place of birth: Jyväskylä, Finland
- Height: 1.87 m (6 ft 1 1/2 in)
- Position: Goalkeeper

Team information
- Current team: FCV
- Number: 1

Senior career*
Years	Team	Apps	(Gls)
2008	IFK Mariehamn	5	(0)
2009	JJK	0	(0)
- * Club domestic league appearances and goals as of 12 October 2009

Matti Salkojärvi (born 3 October 1984) is a Finnish football player who formerly played for FCV. Matti was born in Jyväskylä.

== See also ==
- Football in Finland
- List of football clubs in Finland
