= Jyväskylä Arts Festival =

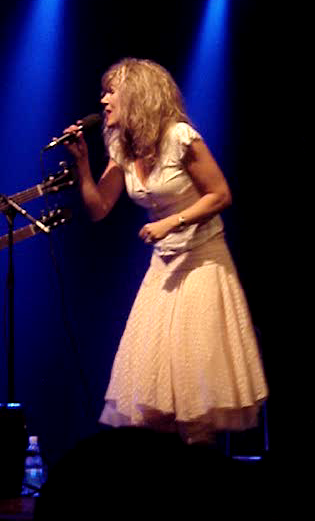
Anna-Mari Kähärä performing at the festival in 2007

Jyväskylä Arts Festival (Finnish: Jyväskylän kesä) is an arts festival celebrated annually at Jyväskylä, Finland since 1956. It has since become one of the biggest arts festivals in Finland. Close to 40,000 people took part in the event in 2009.
