= List of lakes in Jyväskylä =

There are 328 lakes in Jyväskylä, a city in Finland and the regional capital of Central Finland. All of the lakes are listed here. Lake IDs are given if there are many lakes with the same name.

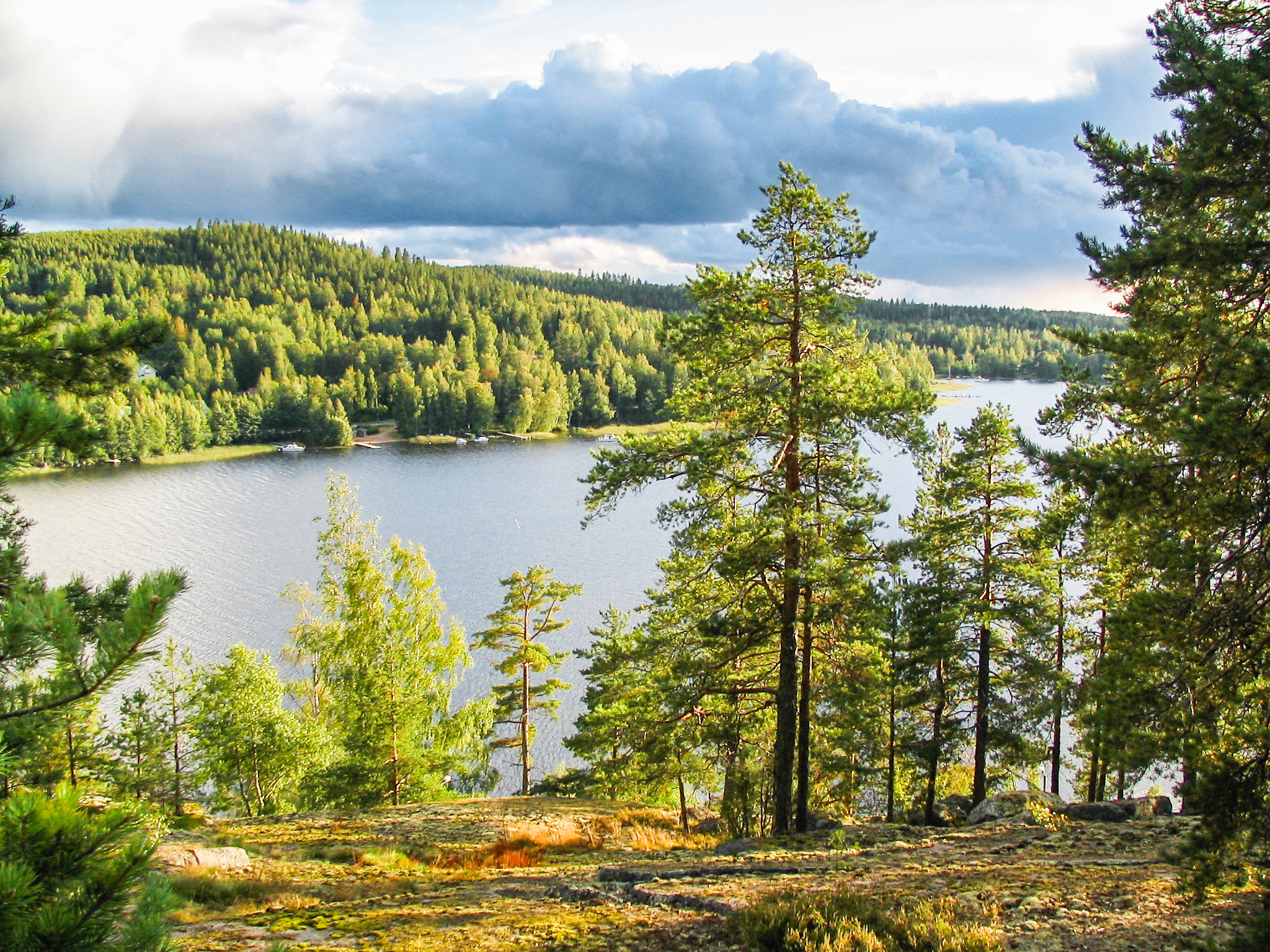
Päijänne photographed from Hill Satasarvinen

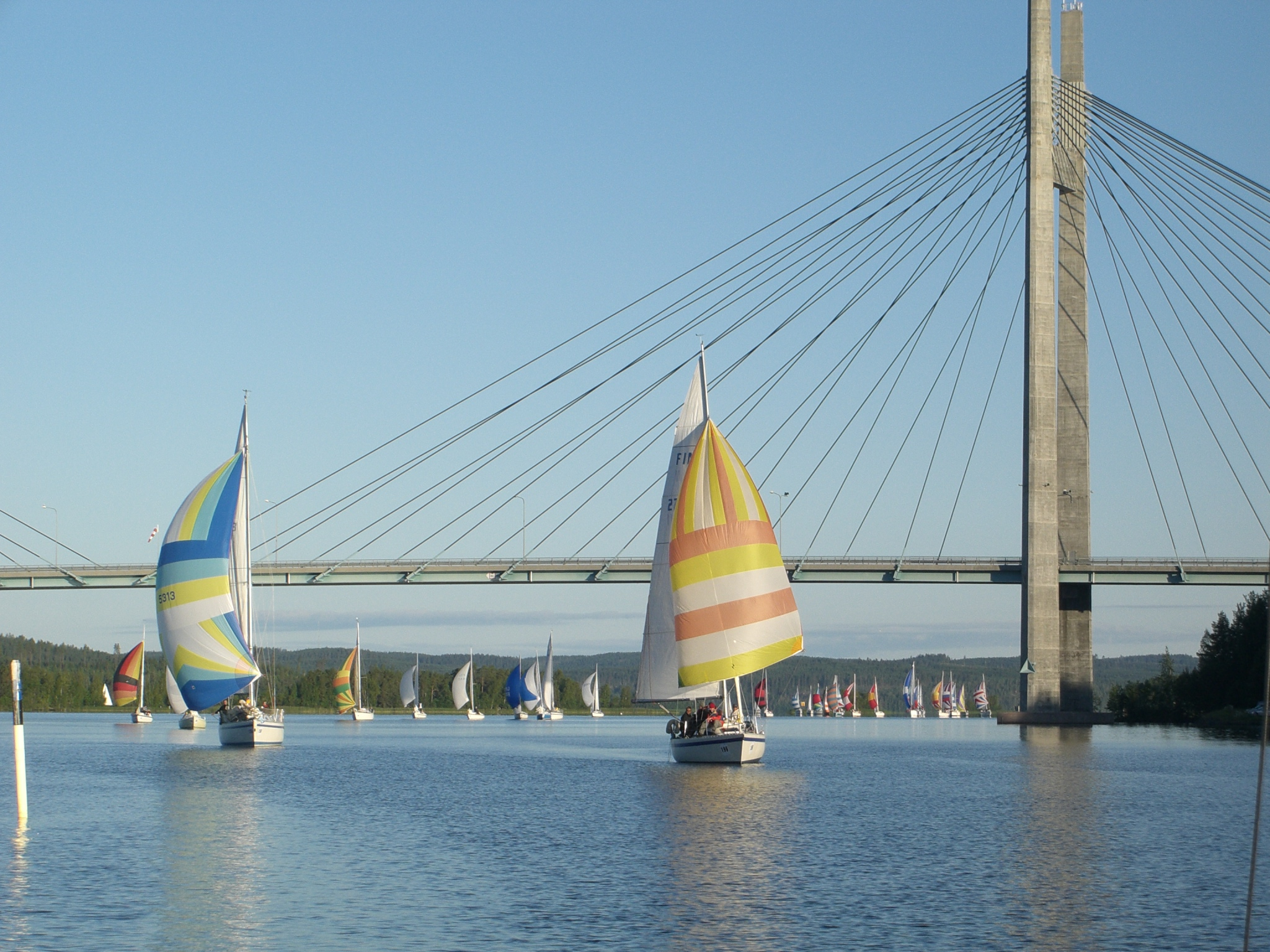
Sailing boats on Lake Päijänne

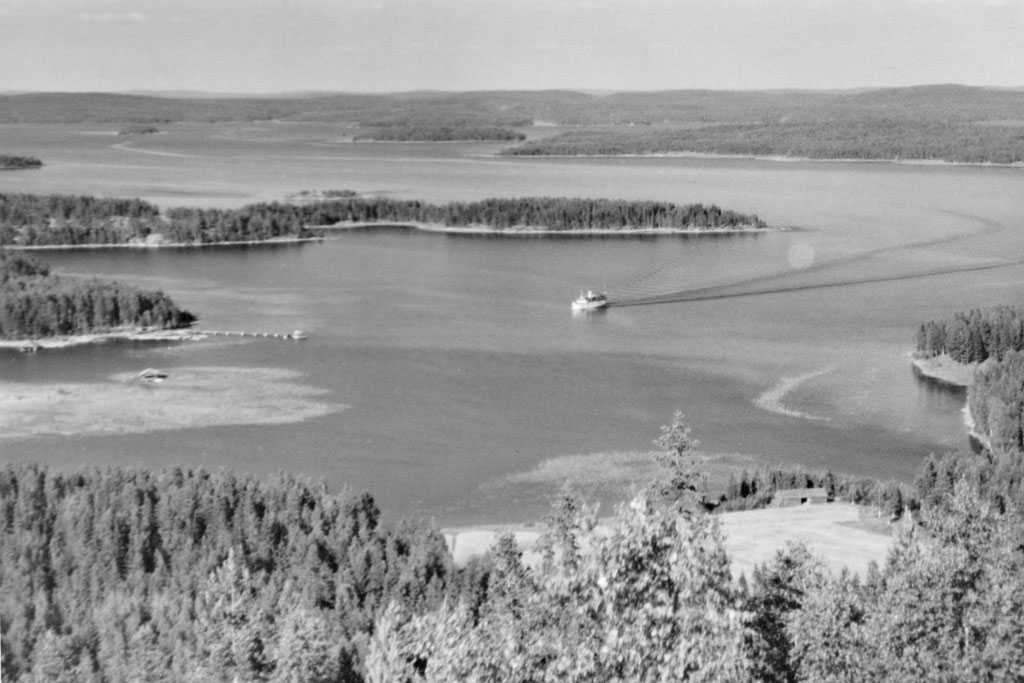
Lake Päijänne, the second biggest lake in Finland, photographed in 1948

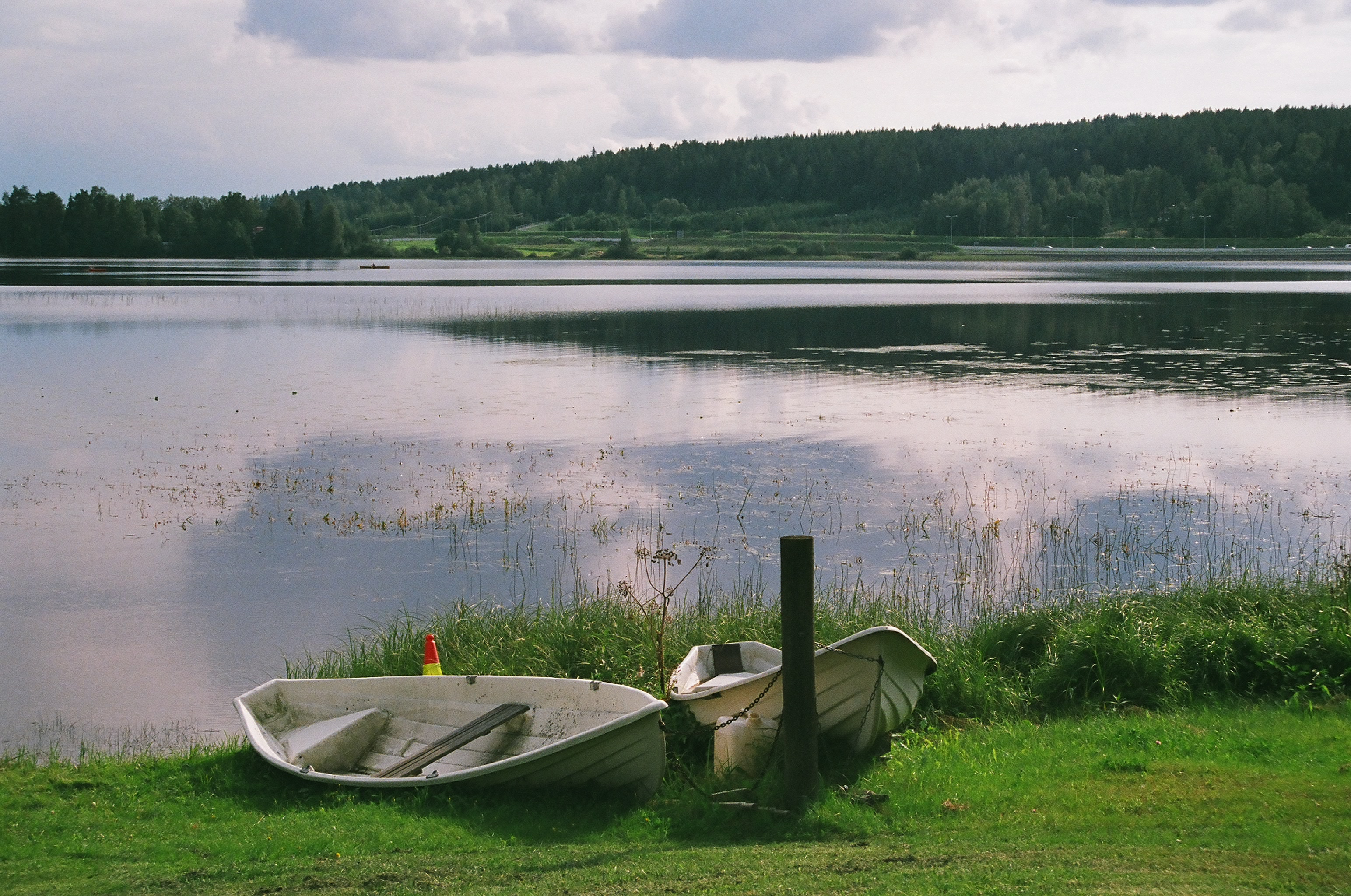
Palokkajärvi

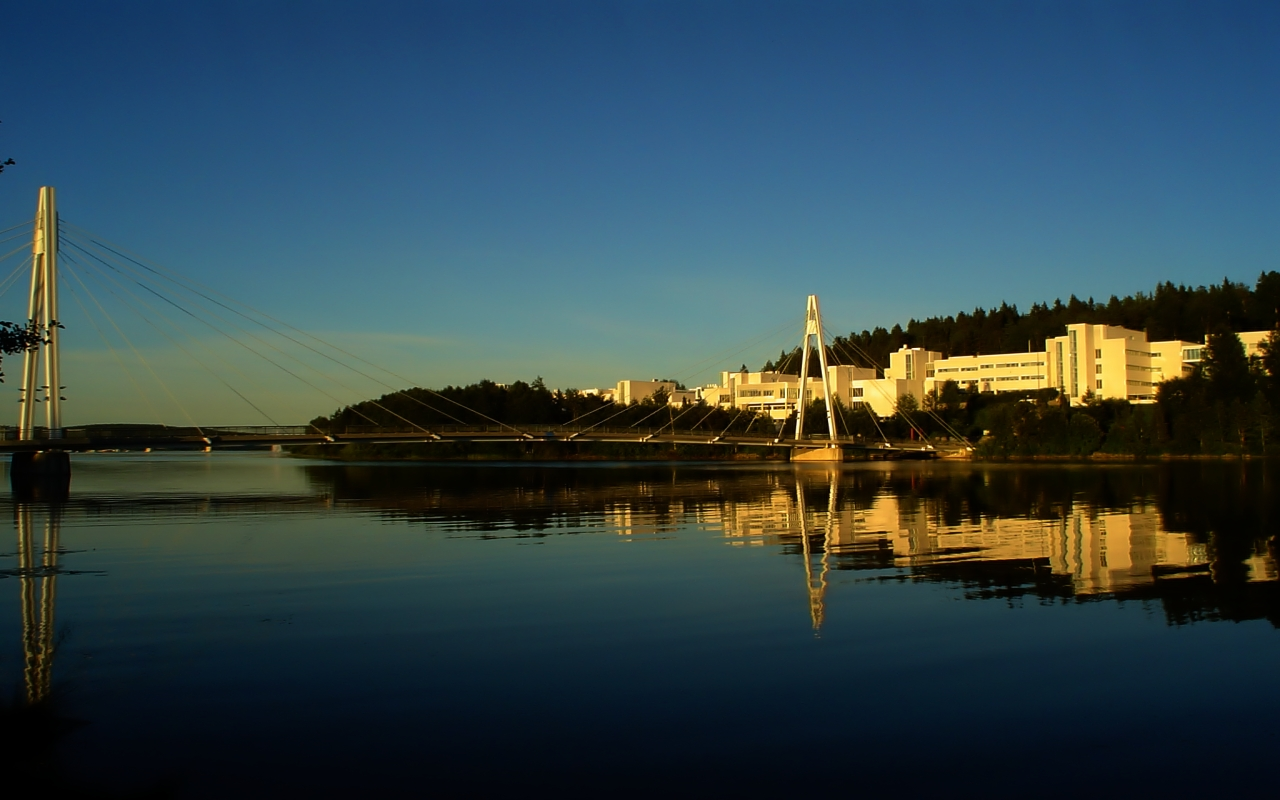
Southern end of Lake Jyväsjärvi

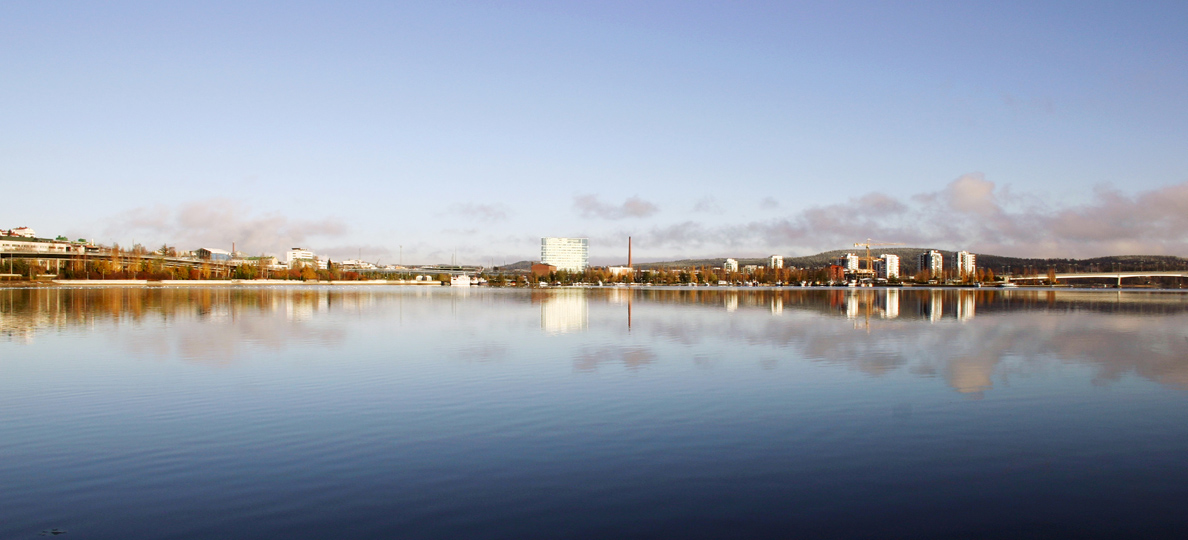
Northern end of Lake Jyväsjärvi

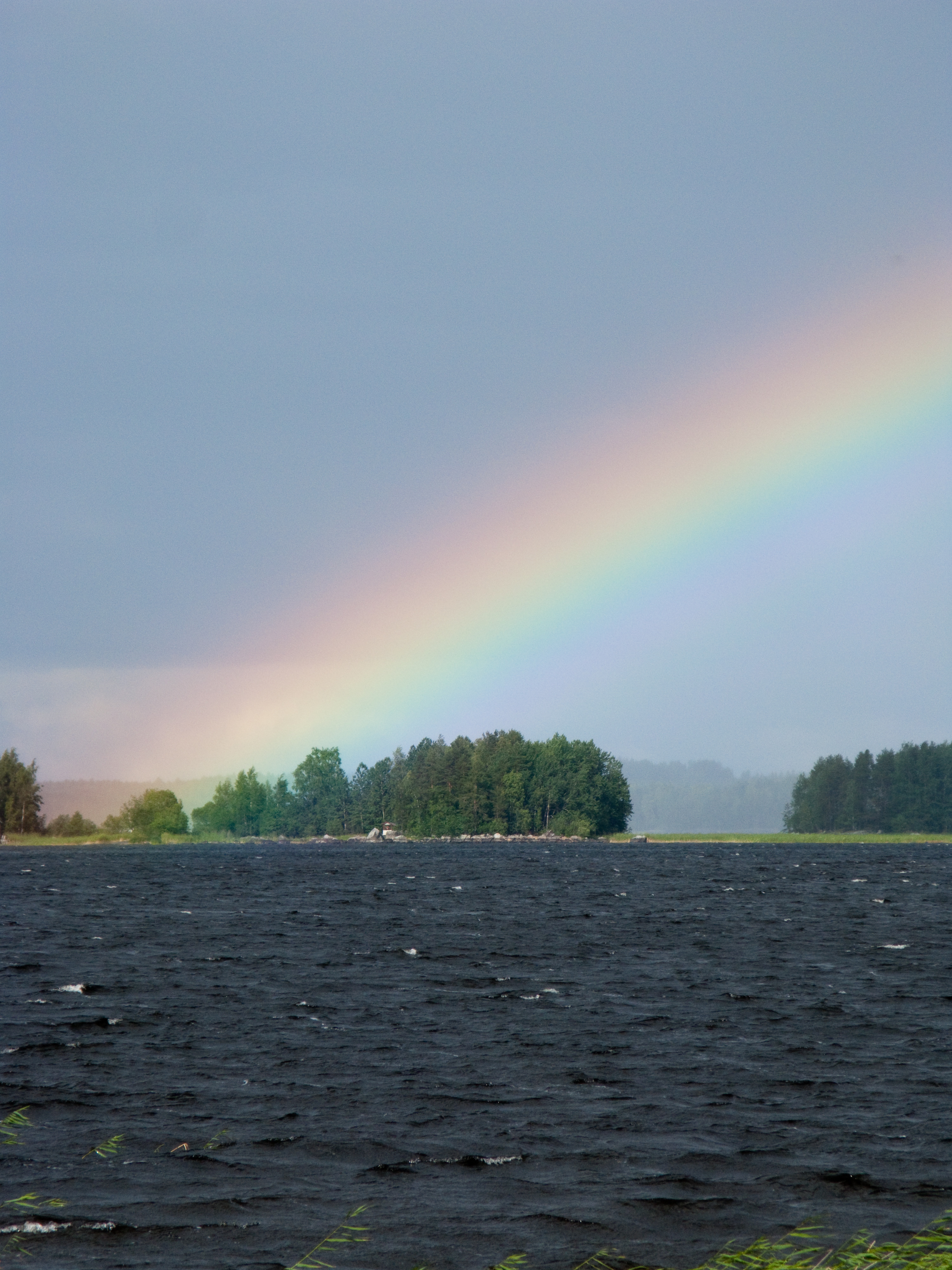
Leppävesi on the border of Jyväskylä and Laukaa

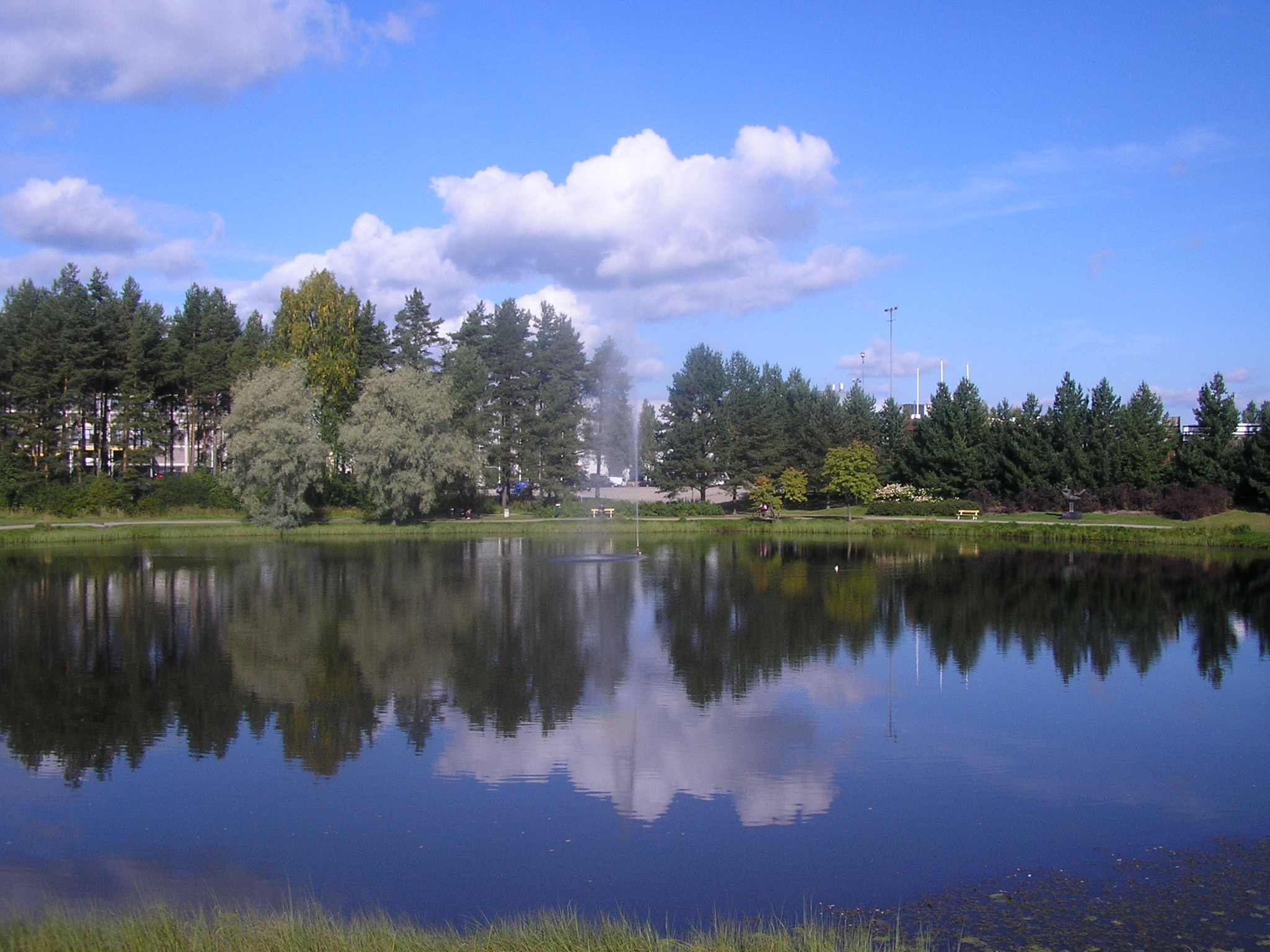
Köyhälampi pond

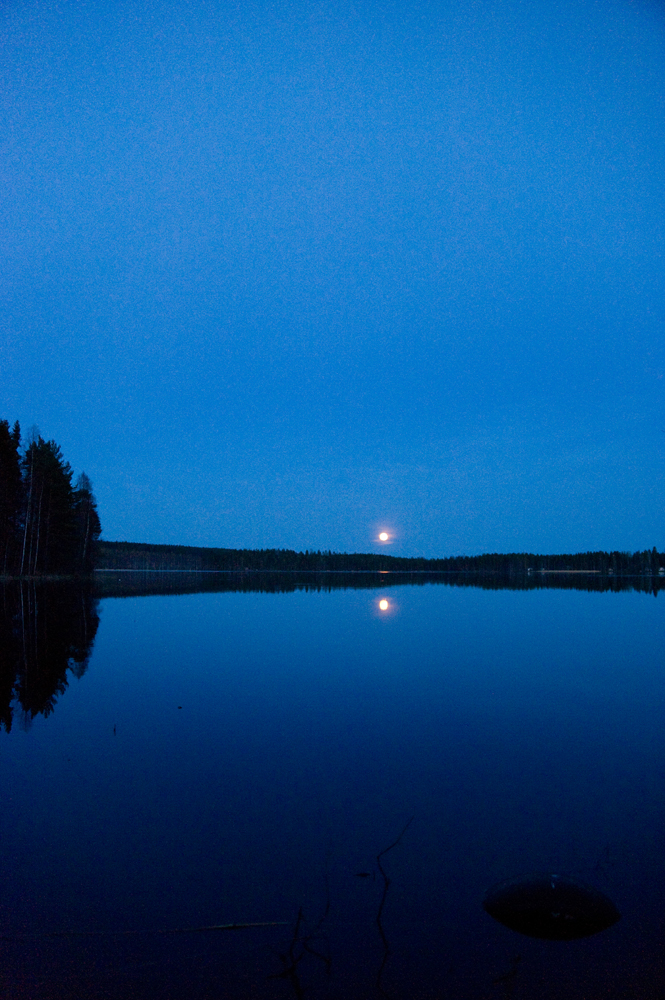
Sääksjärvi

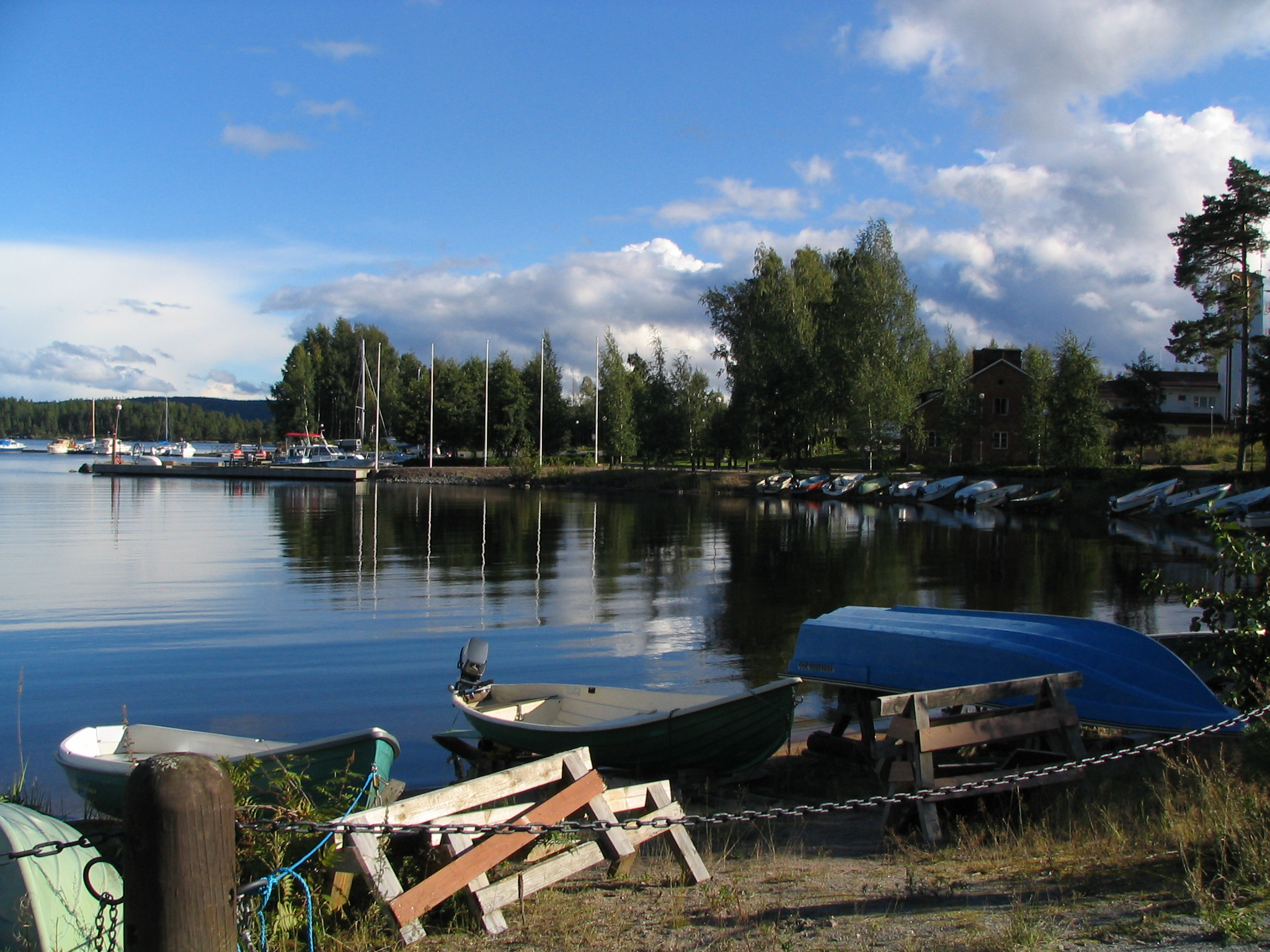
Säynätsalo harbor on Lake Päijänne

== Alphabetical listing ==
=== A ===
Ahostenlampi, Ahvenlampi (14.239.1.004), Ahvenlampi (14.239.1.003), Ahvenus, Ala-Aitolampi, Ala-Kitulampi, Alainen Ruokepuolinen, Alainen Vehkajärvi, Alalampi, Alvajärvi, Ankeriasjärvi, Askeleentakanen, Asmalampi, Auvanen

=== H ===
Haapalampi, Hangasjärvi (14.282.1.001), Hangasjärvi (14.282.1.011), Hanhijärvi, Hanhilampi, Haukilampi (14.317.1.015), Haukilampi (14.285.1.015), Haukilampi (14.295.1.011), Haukkalampi, Heinonen, Heinälampi, Hettee, Hietajärvi, Hiidenjärvi, Hirvijärvi, Hoikanjärvi, Hoikka, Honkalampi, Huhtalampi, Huhtilampi, Humalalampi, Hupelinlampi, Huujärvi, Höyhenisjärvi

=== I ===
Iso Hanslampi, Iso Heinäjärvi, Iso Housujärvi, Iso Joutenlampi, Iso-Kairahta, Iso-Kaukuu, Iso Kalliolampi, Iso Koirajärvi, Iso Koukkujärvi, Iso-Kovalainen, Iso-Kuukkanen, Iso Lampsinjärvi, Iso-Musta, Iso-Peräinen, Iso Peräjärvi, Iso-Soukka, Iso-Vasarainen, Iso Vihtajärvi, Iso Vääräpää, Isojärvi

=== J ===
Joutee, Juoneenjärvi, Juurikkaanjärvi, Jyväsjärvi

=== K ===
Kaakkolampi (14.294.1.008), Kaakkolampi (14.295.1.017), Kaakkolampi (14.298.1.003), Kaakkolampi (14.312.1.006), Kaakonlampi, Kaijanlampi, Kaitajärvi (14.221.1.182), Kaitajärvi (14.221.1.200), Kaitajärvi (14.239.1.007), Kaitajärvi (14.293.1.007), Kaitalampi, Kalaton, Kaleton, Kalliojärvi (14.221.1.166), Kalliojärvi (14.284.1.012), Kalliojärvi (14.286.1.013), Kalliolampi (14.237.1.005), Kalliolampi (14.239.1.006), Kamppijärvi, Kangasjärvi, Kangaslampi (14.294.1.002), Kangaslampi (14.312.1.004), Karhujärvi, Karisjärvi (14.221.1.172), Karisjärvi (14.221.1.195), Kaukkaanlampi, Kauralampi, Kennäälänlampi, Kepolampi, Keski-Kännää, Keskinen, Keskinen Kattilajärvi, Keskinen Naulajärvi, Keskinen Vehkajärvi, Killervä, Kinnaslampi, Kivelän Viemärilampi, Kivijärvi (14.231.1.029), Kivijärvi (14.281.1.004), Kivilampi, Koiralampi, Kolmisoppinen, Kolujärvi, Korpijärvi, Korttajärvi, Koskenlampi, Kotajärvet Isompi, Kotajärvet Pienempi, Kotalampi (14.232.1.004), Kotalampi (14.283.1.009), Kotanen, Koukkujärvi, Koulun Viemärilampi, Kovaslammi, Koveroinen, Kuivalampi, Kukkarojärvi, Kumpulampi, Kumpulampi-Likolampi, Kurppa, Kuusjärvi, Köhniönjärvi, Köntyslampi

=== L ===
Lahnajärvi, Lahnalampi, Lapinjärvi, Lautakkojärvi, Lauttalampi (14.231.1.002), Lauttalampi (14.285.1.026), Lehesjärvi–Vähäjärvi, Lehmilampi, Leppävesi, Lepäslampi, Liinalampi (14.296.1.015), Liinalampi (14.311.1.014), Likolampi, Luhtajärvi, Lukkonen, Lummejärvi, Luonetjärvi, Luotojärvi, Löytänelampi

=== M ===
Maahinjärvi, Maatianjärvi, Mainiotlammit, Majajärvi (14.293.1.005), Majajärvi (14.296.1.003), Marjojärvi, Masonjärvi, Metsä-Viemärilampi, Moksinjärvi, Moksinmyllylampi, Mustajärvi (14.231.1.018), Mustajärvi (14.285.1.020), Mustalammi, Mustalampi (14.232.1.006) (0,024 km^{2}), Mustalampi (14.285.1.012), Mustalampi (14.285.1.025), Mustalampi (14.291.1.005), Mustalampi (14.295.1.018), Mutalampi, Muuratjärvi, Muurikaisjärvi, Myllyjärvi (14.221.1.187), Myllyjärvi (14.231.1.003), Myllyjärvi (14.232.1.001), Myllyjärvi (14.284.1.013), Myllyjärvi (14.287.1.006), Myllyjärvi (14.293.1.001), Myllyjärvi (14.294.1.009), Myllylampi (14.231.1.005), Myllylampi (14.295.1.014), Mysiönlampi, Mäkijärvi, Mäyrälampi, Mökkilänjärvi, Mörkölampi,

=== N ===
Nameless (14.231.1.042), Nameless (14.231.1.043), Nameless (14.274.1.017), Nameless(14.285.1.029), Nameless (14.295.1.013), Naskuttajanlampi, Neulajärvi, Neulalampi, Niemijärvi, Niinijärvi (i), Niinijärvi (p), Nokkoslampi, Nälkäjärvi

=== O ===
Onkilampi, Orajärvi,

=== P ===
Pahalampi, Pahkalampi, Painaanjärvi, Pajulampi, Palokkajärvi, Palvajärvi, Paskolampi, Patajärvi, Pennijärvi, Perälampi, Pieni Hanslampi, Pieni Hirvijärvi, Pieni Humalajärvi, Pieni Joutenlampi, Pieni Koirajärvi, Pieni-Kairahta, Pieni-Kaukuu, Pieni-Kovalainen, Pieni-Mustalampi, Pieni-Vasarainen, Pieni-Virkanen, Pikku-Lampsi, Pikku-Soukka, Pilkkurilammi, Pirttijärvi (14.221.1.211), Pirttijärvi (14.272.1.004), Pirttijärvi (14.283.1.004), Pirttijärvi (14.286.1.016), Pirttijärvi (14.287.1.008), Pirttilampi, Pitkäjärvi (14.285.1.011), Pitkäjärvi, Pitkäjärvi (14.317.1.002), Pohjanlampi, Punajärvi, Pyssyjärvi, Pyydysjärvi, Päijänne,

=== R ===
Rajajärvi, Raspio, Rimminjärvi, Rimminlampi, Ruokepuolinen, Ruokepuoliset (i), Ruokepuoliset (l),

=== S ===
Saanijärvi, Saarijärvi (14.285.1.010), Saarijärvi (14.286.1.003), Saarijärvi (14.295.1.003), Salmijärvi (14.221.1.193), Salmijärvi (14.287.1.014), Saukkojärvi (e), Saukkojärvi (p), Savilammi, Savilampi, Sipilänjärvi, Sirkkalampi, Soidenlammi, Soidenlampi, Soimalampi, Sompanen, Sonnamanlampi, Suojärvi, Suolijärvi, Surkee, Syväjärvi, Syvälampi, Särkijärvi (14.221.1.205), Särkijärvi (14.283.1.012), Särkilampi (14.286.1.009), Särkilampi (14.295.1.031), Säynätjärvi, Sääksjärvi

=== T ===
Talsanlampi, Tekolampi, Terva-alanen, Tervalampi, Tiehinen, Tuhkuri, Tuohelanjärvi, Tuohikotanen, Tuomiojärvi, Tyyppälänjärvi, Tyystlampi

=== U ===
Uittimenjärvi

=== V ===
Vaarunjärvi, Valkeajärvi (14.221.1.179), Valkeajärvi (14.221.1.201), Valkeajärvi (14.274.1.008), Valkealampi, Valkeislampi, Valkolampi (14.286.1.024), Valkolampi (14.295.1.049), Varrenvesi, Varsajärvi, Vasarainen, Vasikkalampi, Vatsajärvi, Vedenpuhdistamo (14.295.2.001), Vedenpuhdistamo (14.295.2.002), Veijonjärvi, Veijonjärvi, Velakallionlampi, Vesankajärvi, Viheriäislammi, Vihtajärvi, Viitalampi, Viljasjärvi, Vinkara, Virkanen, Virolainen, Vuohijärvi, Vuorenalanen, Vuorilampi (14.231.1.038), Vuorilampi (14.291.1.004), Vähä Heinäjärvi, Vähä Tuomiojärvi, Vähä-Vesanka, Vähäjärvi (14.221.1.207), Vähäjärvi (14.287.1.005), Vääräjärvi (14.295.1.033), Vääräjärvi (14.312.1.003), Väärälampi

=== Y ===
Ykshaukinen (14.286.1.006), Ykshaukinen (14.294.1.001), Ylä-Aitolampi, Ylä-Kitulampi, Ylä-Kännää, Ylä-Sallaajärvi, Ylä-Tuomiojärvi, Yläinen Kotajärvi, Yläinen Vehkajärvi, Yläinen Vihtajärvi, Ylälampi, Yölampi

=== Ö ===
Örö

== Ten largest lakes ==
rank	name	area (km^{2})
1	Päijänne	1,082.89
2	Leppävesi	63.593
3	Muuratjärvi	31.54
4	Saarijärvi	5.773
5	Tuomiojärvi	2.979
6	Palokkajärvi	2.577
7	Luonetjärvi	2.174
8	Alvajärvi-Korttajärvi	2.087
9	Vesankajärvi	2.029
10	Iso-Kuukkanen	1.803
