= Rannankylä, Muurame =

Rannankylä
- Village
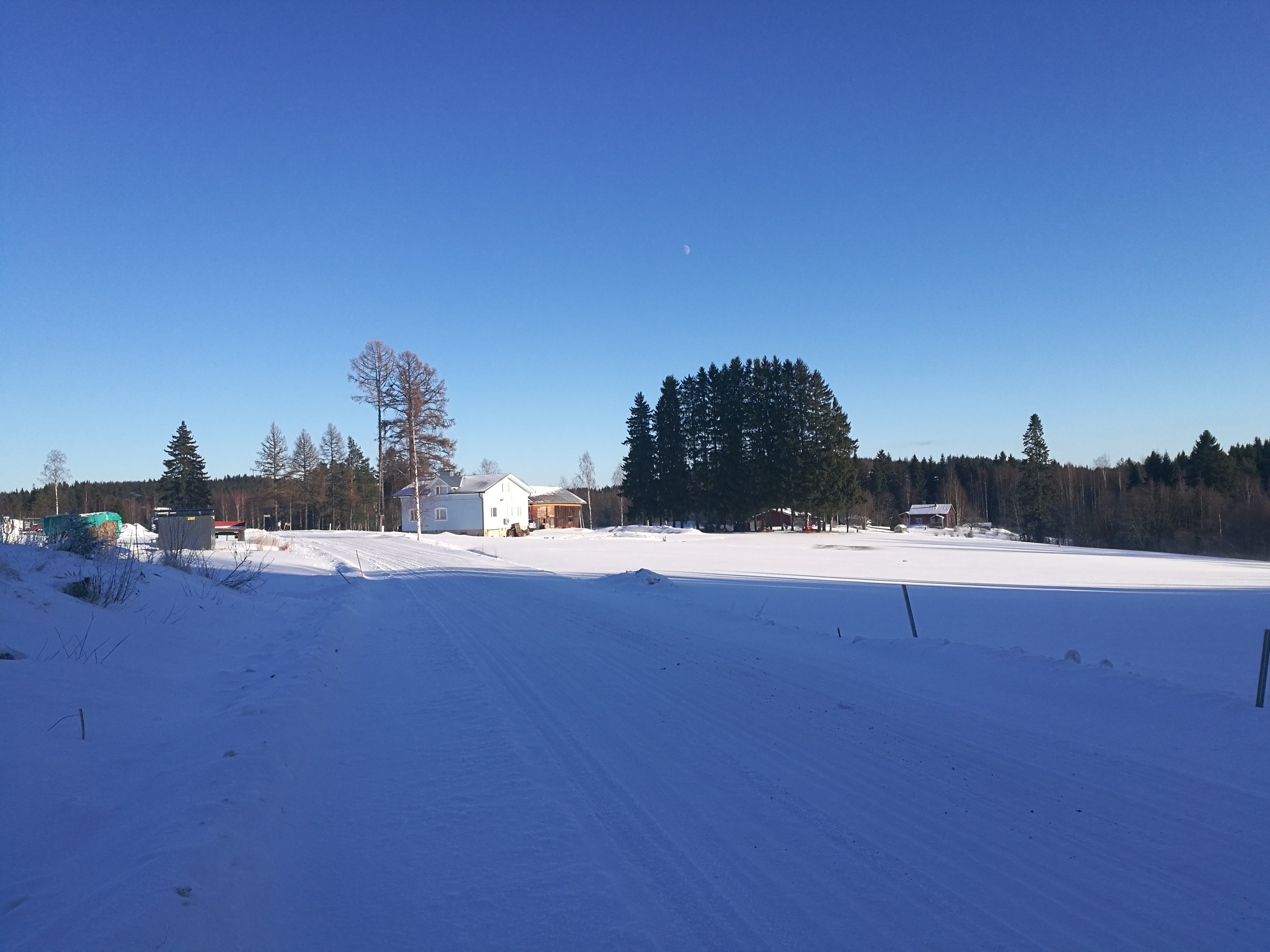
- View from the road Rannankyläntie.

- Location in Central Finland Rannankylä (Finland)
- Coordinates: 62.163°N 25.611°E
- Country: Finland
- Region: Central Finland
- Sub-region: Jyväskylä sub-region
- Municipality: Muurame

Population (2022-12-31)
  - Total: 710
- Time zone: UTC+2 (EET)
  - Summer (DST): UTC+3 (EEST)
- Postal code: 40950, 40530

Rannankylä is a village in Muurame, Finland, located north of lake Muuratjärvi. It covers an area roughly between central Muurame, the village of Isolahti and the municipal border with Jyväskylä. As of 31 December 2022, the statistical area of Rannankylä had a population of 710.

The first farms in Rannankylä were established in the mid-18th century. When the Great Partition was carried out in Muurame starting in 1760, more farms were established in the area, causing Rannankylä to develop into a distinct village. A school was active in the village from 1900 to 1972.

== Geography ==
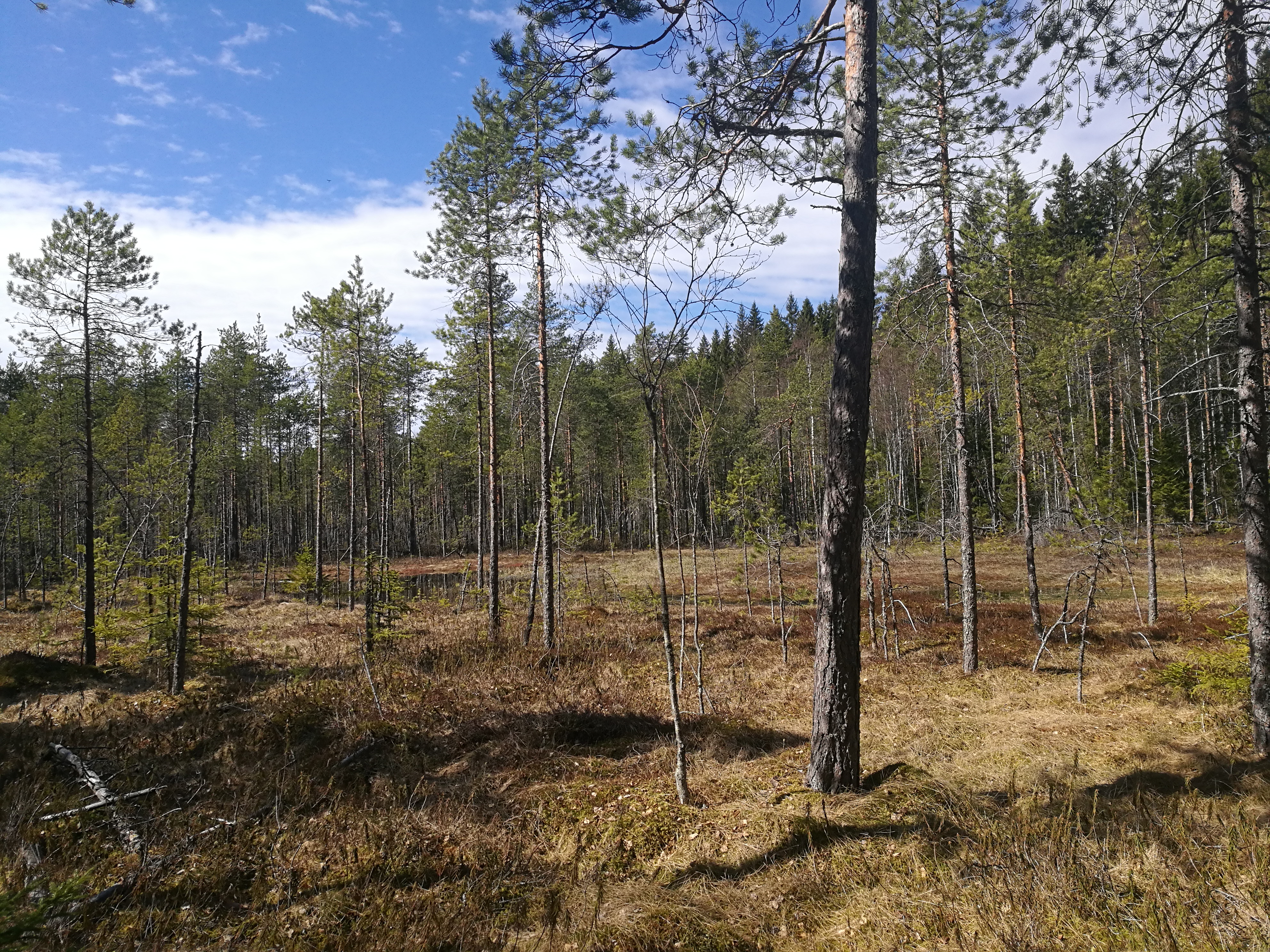
Eastern part of Hongistonkorpi

=== Boundaries ===
Rannankylä is a wide area with no clear borders, with local definitions of its boundaries having been influenced by those of school districts and village associations. The village has traditionally been divided into multiple distinct sections, such as Sötkö and Hetteenpohja in the east, Töppöspohja in the west and Ruokopohja in the north. The village of Isolahti was also often considered part of Rannankylä before a school was established there in the 1920s, after which the Sallaanoja (Mutkaoja) stream has sometimes been seen as the border between the two by locals.

The official statistical area of Rannankylä (also called Rannankylä-Valkola-Rajahonka) covers an area between Jyväskylä in the north, central Muurame in the southeast, lake Muuratjärvi in the south and Isolahti in the northwest, also encompassing the Valkola area. The urban areas (taajama) of Muuramen kirkonkylä and Jyväskylä extend slightly into the statistical area. On 31 December 2022, the statistical area had a population of 710, an increase from 692 in 2021.

=== Nature ===
The Hongistonkorpi wetland in the eastern part of Rannankylä forms a 24-hectare (59-acre) Natura 2000 site together with Härkösuo in Jyväskylä. It consists mainly of sphagnum bog, but also includes sections of sedge bog and coniferous swamp. Notable species found in the wetland include the rare moss Hamatocaulis lapponicus, mentioned in the European Union's Habitats Directive.

== History ==
The area of modern Rannankylä was uninhabited hinterlands of the village of Muurame until the 18th century. The first estate in what is now Rannankylä was Alhonsaari, established in 1744 as a tenant farm under the Kauppila farm. Two tenant farms under Nisula were established soon afterwards: Salmenlahti in 1746 and Härköjärvi in 1751. It was not until the Great Partition, carried out in Muurame starting in 1760, when Rannankylä began developing into a distinct village. By 1820, 26 new independent farms had been established in the area. The village's size remained mostly unchanged until the end of the century, with only a few new farms being established.

The village was commonly known as Metsäkylä in the 1800s, with the modern name Rannankylä first being used in official documents of the municipality of Korpilahti (including Muurame at that time) in 1901. However, the name had already seen some use before this; for example, a local dairy association founded in 1895 used Rannankylä in its name. The municipality of Muurame was separated from Korpilahti in 1921.

Following World War II, Karelian refugees, mainly from Sortavalan maalaiskunta and Pyhäjärvi Vpl, were settled in Muurame starting in 1945. New farms in Rannankylä were established mainly on state-owned lands.

Rannankylä was chosen as the national village of the year (vuoden kylä) in 1991.

== Services ==
=== School ===
The Rannankylä school district was established in 1900 and the school's main building was built on lands of the Tuomisto farm. It was the fourth school in contemporary Korpilahti, preceded by the schools in Korpilahden kirkonkylä, Muuramen kirkonkylä and Putkilahti. The district included Isolahti until 1926, as well as Valkola and Oksalanmäki until the latter half of the century, while not including Ruokopohja, which was part of the Taka-Keljo district. The school was closed in 1972.

=== Golf course ===
The golf course of Rannankylä was established in 1994 and was originally located near the Riihivuori hill in southeastern Muurame, before being moved to its current location in 2002. It was expanded into its current size with 18 holes in 2006.
