= Isolahti, Muurame =

Isolahti
- Village
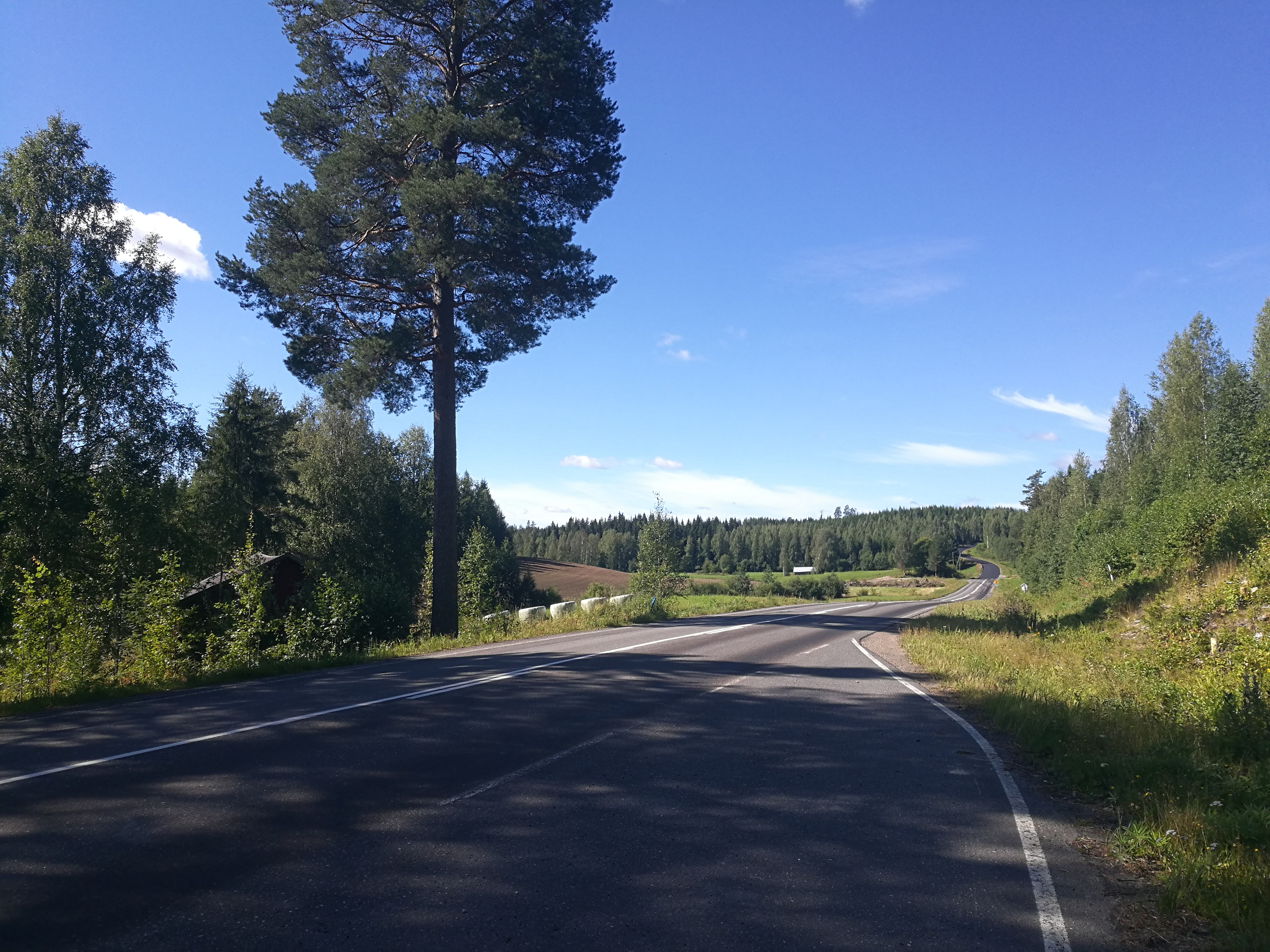
- View from the road Saukkolahdentie

- Location in Central Finland
- Coordinates: 62.197°N 25.552°E
- Country: Finland
- Region: Central Finland
- Sub-region: Jyväskylä sub-region
- Municipality: Muurame

Population (2022)
  - Total: 534
- Time zone: UTC+2 (EET)
  - Summer (DST): UTC+3 (EEST)
- Website: https://www.muuramenisolahti.fi/

Isolahti is a village in Muurame, Finland, located in the northwestern part of the municipality north of lake Muuratjärvi. The distance to both central Muurame and Jyväskylä is about 14 kilometers (8.7 mi). As of 31 December 2022, the statistical area of Isolahti had 534 inhabitants.

The center of Isolahti is classified as an urban area (taajama) named Sallaajärvet. It had a population of 236 as of 31 December 2023.

The area of Isolahti was uninhabited until the late 18th and early 19th centuries, when small farms began to be established on lands belonging to the village of Tikkala as well as state-owned lands.

== Etymology ==
The village is named after the Isolahti (lit. 'big bay') bay of lake Muuratjärvi. The name Isolahti seems to be fairly recent and formed on the basis of Vähälahti (lit. 'small bay'), the name of another bay of the lake. The original name of the bay was Salavalahti, where the initial element salava means Salix sp., and the area was known as Salavalahdenmaa in the 16th century.

== Geography ==
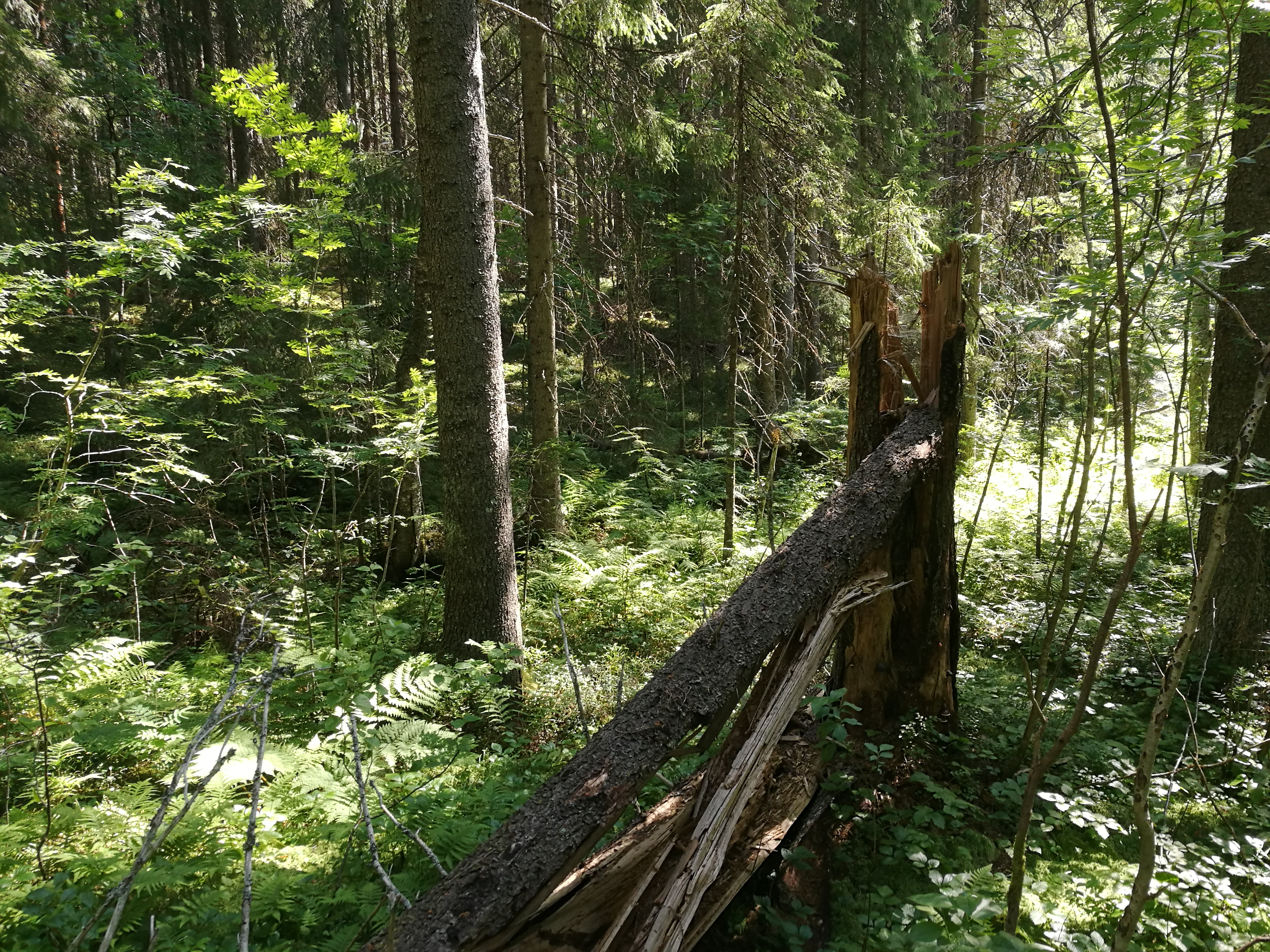
Kirkkokangas conservation area

=== General ===
Isolahti is located in the northwestern part of Muurame near the border with Jyväskylä. Nearby settlements include Rannankylä in the south, Taka-Keljo in the east and Saukkola in the west. The highways 16607 and 16615 pass through the village, with the former connecting it to Jyväskylä and Saukkola and the latter to Rannankylä and central Muurame. The distance to both central Muurame and downtown Jyväskylä is about 14 kilometers (8.7 mi) from the village's most densely populated part around the school.

=== Boundaries ===
The municipal statistical area of Isolahti covers the entire northwestern part of Muurame, bordering Jyväskylä in the north, east and west. On 31 December 2022, the statistical area had a population of 534.

The center of Isolahti is classified as an urban area, as defined by Statistics Finland, named Sallaajärvet. It extends slightly into Taka-Keljo in Jyväskylä. On 31 December 2023, the urban area had a population of 236, out of whom 234 lived in Muurame and two in Jyväskylä.

Locally, the Sallaanoja stream may be seen as the border between Isolahti and Rannankylä.

=== Nature ===
The Natura 2000 site of Kuusmäki-Tikkamäki-Kirkkokangas-Valkeavuori is located near Isolahti, comprising the old-growth forest conservation areas of Kuusimäki, Tikkamäki and Kirkkokangas with the addition of the Valkeavuori hill between Kuusimäki and Tikkamäki. It covers an area of 223 hectares (550 acres) and consists mainly of forest dominated by spruces and pines, with the oldest parts of the forest being around 135 years old as of 2023. The oldest of the three conservation areas is Kuusimäki, established in 1911 as an example of birch forest growing on lands formerly used for slash-and-burn agriculture, later naturally turning into a spruce forest.

== History ==
Before being settled, the territory of modern Isolahti belonged to the village of Lemmittylä in Luopioinen as hunting grounds, referred to as Salavalahdenmaa or Lemmittylänmaa. In the latter half of the 16th century, Salavalahdenmaa was bought by Antti Tikkanen, who had settled nearby in what would become the village of Tikkala.

The area of modern Isolahti remained uninhabited until 1763, when a tenant farm by the name of Tikkamäki was established there. More farms were established during the 1820s and 1830s. All of the earliest farms in Isolahti were established as tenant farms, either under independent farms or, if located on crown lands, the state. The first ones to become independent farms were Salinaho in 1832, Tikkamäki in 1833, Hernetniemi in 1850 and Pukkimäki in 1851.

The population of Isolahti began growing in the beginning of the 20th century. Isolahti was sometimes seen as part of Rannankylä until the 1920s, when a school was established in the village.

In 1915, the owner of the Säynätsalo factories Hanna Parviainen established a peat production area at the Kattaissuo bog on lands rented from the Metsähallitus. A three-story facility was built on the edge of the bog; it was powered by a 25 hp steam engine and had a production capacity of 200 bales per day (one bale containing 50 kg [110 lb] of litter peat). After Parviainen's death in 1938, it was bought by Emil Oksala, a local butcher. The plant was closed after the Continuation War after its main customer, the Jaakkola farm in central Muurame, was divided into multiple smaller estates for the settlement of refugees.

== Services ==
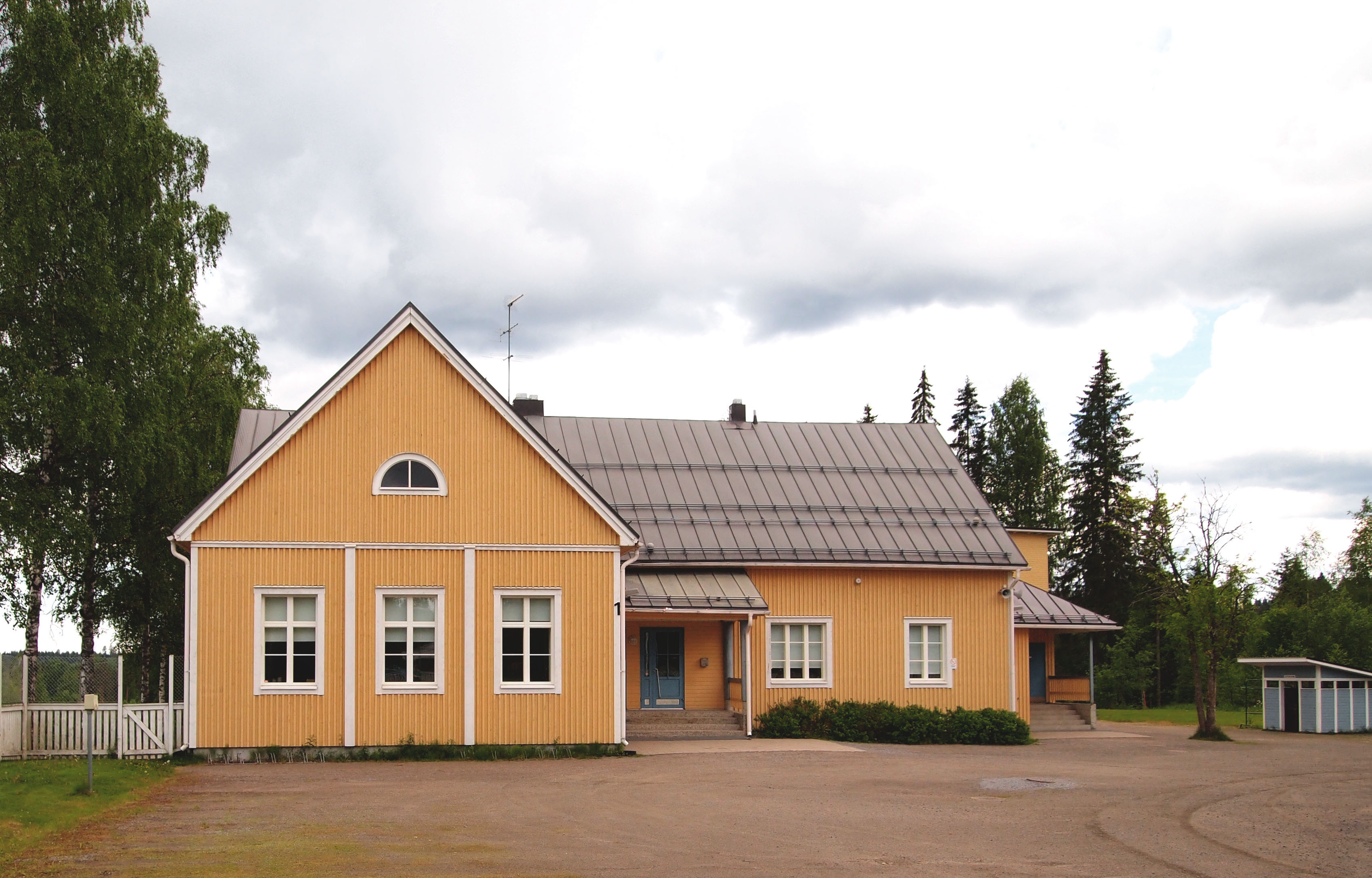
Isolahti school

Services in Isolahti include a school for grades 1–6 (alakoulu), which has been accompanied by a daycare center since 2021. A municipal bookmobile also stops in Isolahti. Other services not found in the village are found in central Muurame or Jyväskylä.

=== School ===
The school district of Isolahti was established in 1920 after the Rannankylä school had become too crowded, though some children also attended school in Saukkola before one was established in Isolahti. The school building was finished in 1928 based on plans by architects A.V. Nieminen and Y.H. Vilkman. It was first renovated and expanded in 1963 and later in 2003, when an indoor sports hall was built. The most recent expansion was finished in 2021.
