= Harvia =

Finnish heater, sauna, and spa manufacturer

Harvia Plc
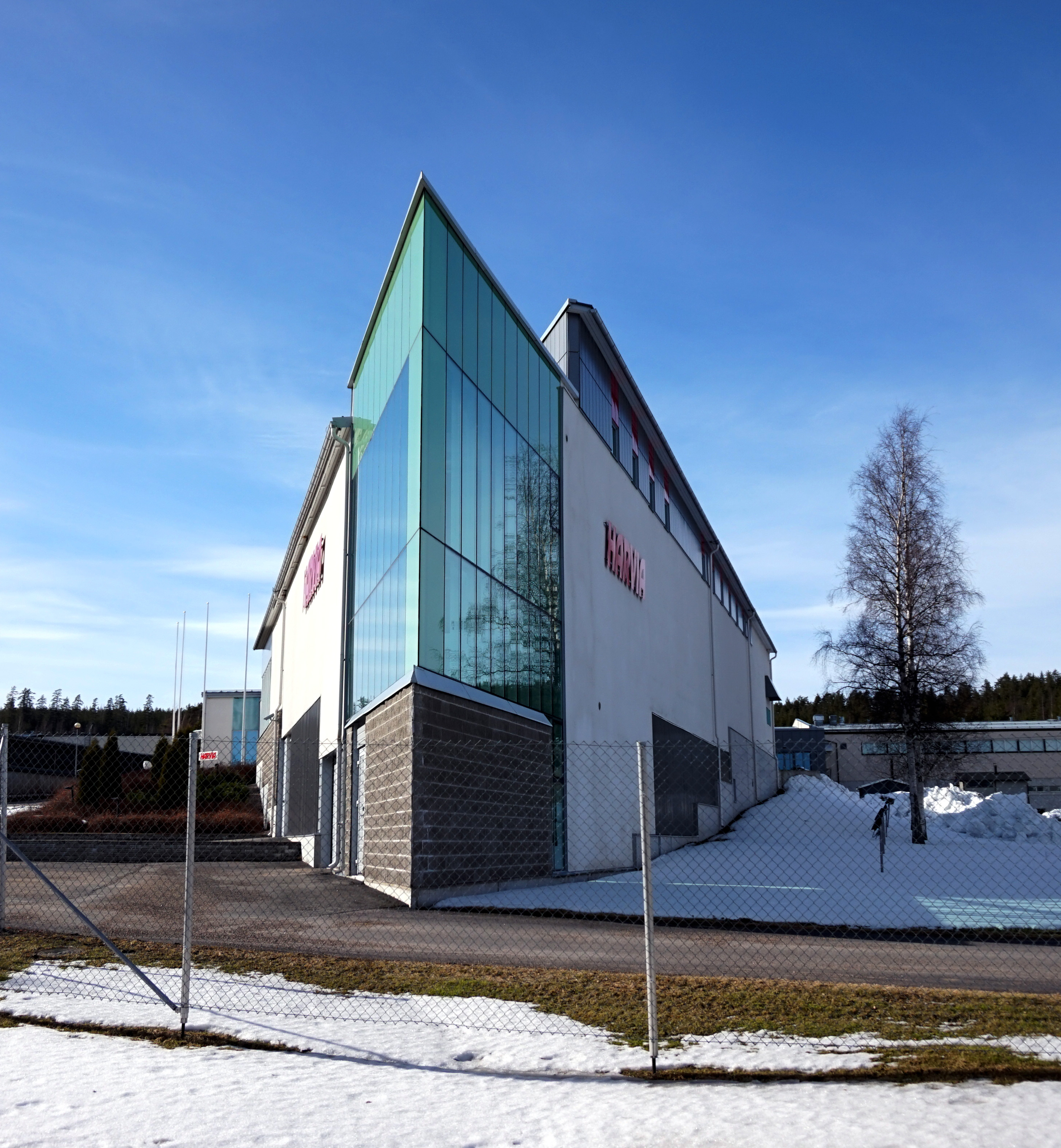
- Harvia factory in Muurame
- Native name: Harvia Oyj
- Company type: Public limited company (Julkinen osakeyhtiö)
- Industry: Manufacturing
- Founded: 1950; 76 years ago in Jyväskylä, Finland
- Founder: Tapani Harvia
- Headquarters: Muurame, Finland
- Key people: Matias Järnefelt (CEO)
- Products: Heaters, saunas, spas, sauna interiors
- Revenue: €150.5 million (2023)
- Number of employees: 612 (2023)
- Website: www.harvia.com

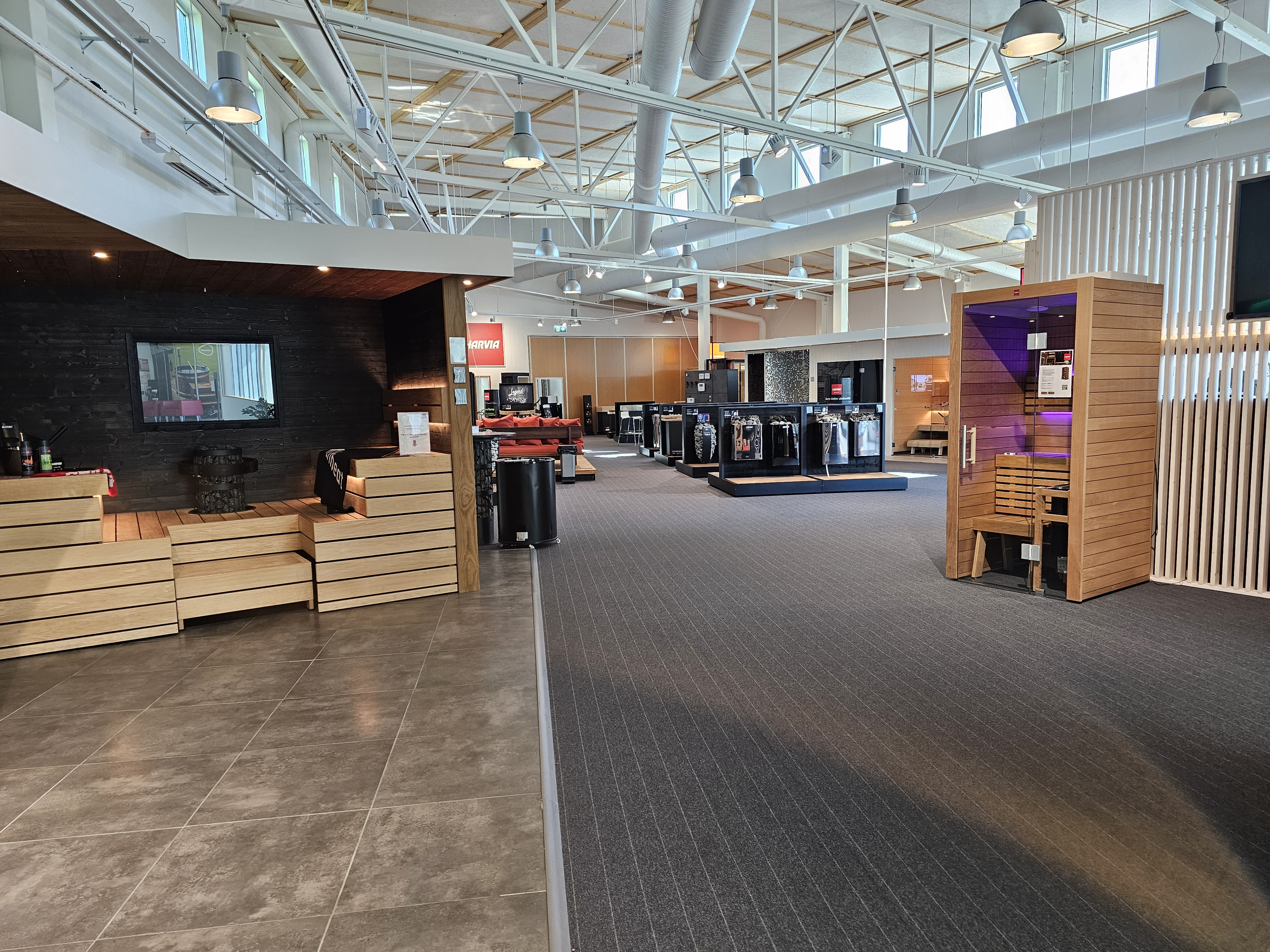
Harvia showroom in Muurame, Finland, 2024.

Harvia Plc (natively Harvia Oyj) is a Finnish heater, sauna, spa and sauna interiors manufacturer. The company's product offering covers all three sauna types: traditional sauna, steam sauna and infrared sauna. Harvia is headquartered in Muurame, Central Finland. The company's products are distributed globally through a network of dealers. Harvia shares (“HARVIA”) are listed on the Nasdaq Helsinki Ltd and are registered in the Finnish Book-Entry Register maintained by Euroclear Finland Ltd.

In 2018, Harvia ranked as the third largest sauna company globally.

== History ==
=== The era of Tapani Harvia (1950–1989) ===
In 1950, Tapani Harvia founded the Art Workshop Harvia (named Taidetakomo Harvia) in Jyväskylä, located on the ground floor of his private residence. The company manufactured decorative items, including hearth doors.

Tapani Harvia made the first Harvia woodburning stove for his own use in 1950. The first woodburning stove for sale was completed in the mid-1950s. By the end of the decade sauna heaters had become Harvia's main product with about 500 sold annually. In 1958 the company was renamed Takomo T Harvia Ky and in 1961 it was renamed Harvia Ky.

In the early 1960s, the production of continuously heated heaters began. By the decade's end, Harvia manufactured about a thousand heaters a year.

Harvia moved from Jyväskylä to Muurame in 1972 to its own industrial hall. Harvia's adult kids joined the company in the mid-1970s. Risto Harvia started as CEO in 1977.

Harvia Ky changed from being a limited liability company to Harvia Oy in 1980. Tapani Harvia retired and served as chairman of the board. In addition to wood-burning stoves, Harvia began manufacturing electric stoves in the early 1980s. In the end of the decade the company manufactured approximately 20,000 wood-fired and 5,000 electric heaters per year.

=== International growth (1990–2013) ===
Growth continued in the 1990s, when the company started exporting to Central Europe, Eastern Europe, Russia and the United States.

At the turn of the millennium, Harvia produced around 100 000 heaters a year, half of which were exported. The company's subsidiary made ready-made heaters for export. The company had a turnover of 135 million markkas and 120 employees.

In 2005, Harvia established a factory in China.

In 2011, the company had a turnover of 65 million euros.

In 2013, Harvia had around 300 employees, with 200 based in Muurame and the rest in China and Hong Kong. Exports accounted for 60 percent of turnover. Risto Harvia retired at the end of the year but continued to serve on the company's board.

=== Owned by CapMan (2014–2017) ===
In spring 2014, the Harvia siblings sold 80 percentage of their family business to the investment fund CapMan. Pertti Harvia continued as CEO, while the other three siblings retired. They justified the transaction on the grounds of Finnish tax: the tax on the generational transfer would have been too expensive for them. Both Harvia and CapMan aimed to list Harvia on the stock exchange in a few years.

For the local market in Russia, a wood-burning stove factory was established in 2015.

Pertti Harvia retired and his successor Tapio Pajuharju took over in June 2016. Pajuharju, who had been CEO of Hartwall, had been on Harvia's board since 2014. The company produced around 200 000 heaters a year, with hundreds of different models. Spa Moduls, a company bought from Estonia, produced steam rooms, known as Turkish saunas. In November, Sentiotec, a company producing products such as sauna rooms, infrared and steam saunas, digital control centres, sauna accessories and electric heaters, was acquired from Austria. The company's product development and production were located in Austria and Romania.

In 2017, the company had 340 employees and a turnover of EUR 60.1 million, with factories in Muurame, China, Romania and Estonia.

=== As a listed company (2018–) ===
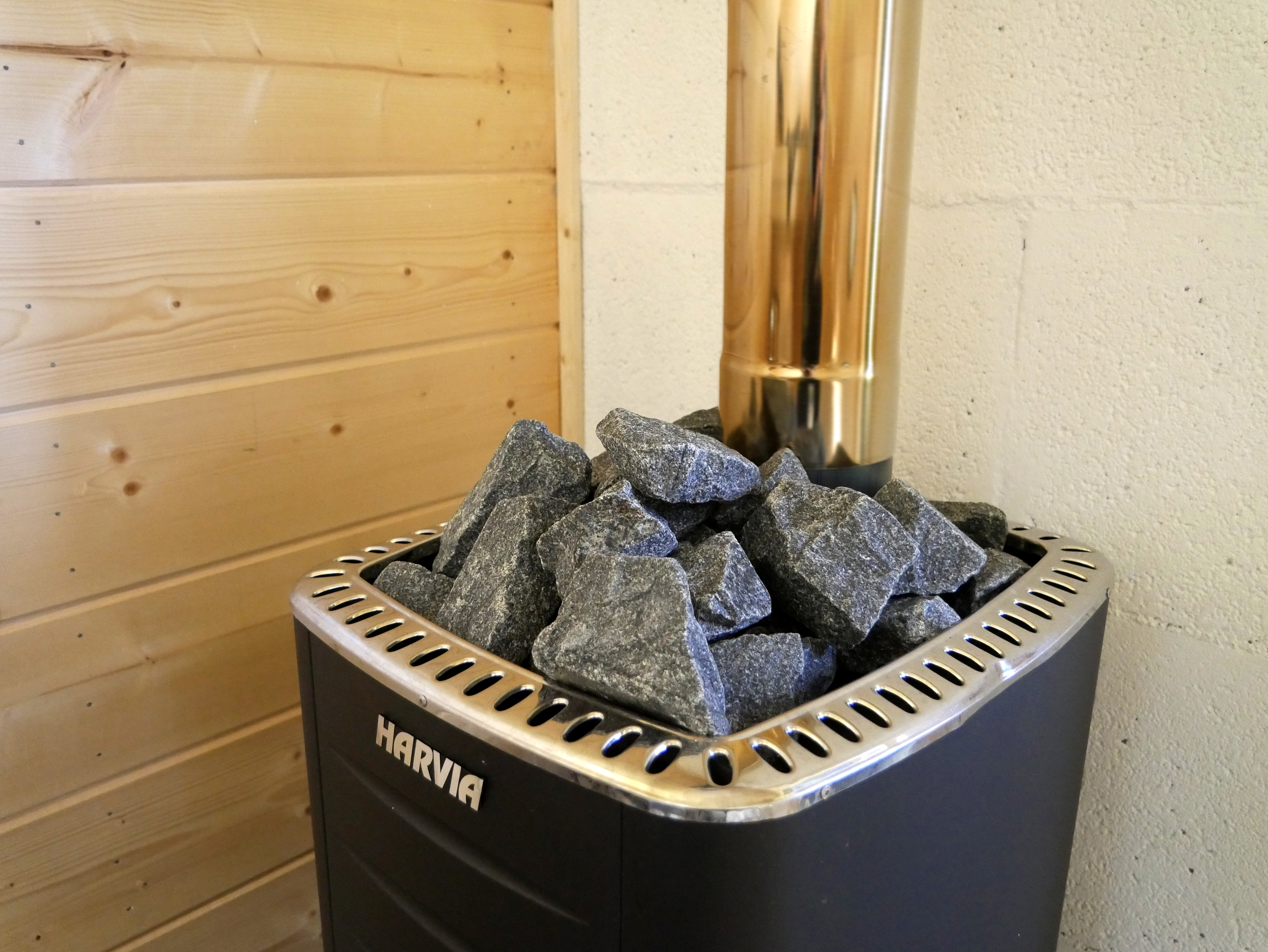
Today's standard Harvia stove

Harvia Corporation was listed on the Helsinki Stock Exchange in March 2018. Sentiotec's heater production was transferred from Serbia to Muurame. In the summer, Harvia had 385 employees, about half of them in Muurame. In December, Harvia acquired the US sauna manufacturer Almost Heaven Saunas, which had been a Harvia customer for five years. The company had a total of 40 employees at its sales office in Holland, Michigan, and its manufacturing plant in Renick, West Virginia.

In November 2019, CapMan sold its remaining shares to Onvest Oy.

In April 2020, Harvia acquired around 80 per cent of EOS Group, a manufacturer of sauna and spa products. The company, which employed 190 people, produced products such as control centres, steam generators and infrared equipment, as well as heaters. The company was active in both Germany and Russia. The demand for Harvia's products surged during the COVID-19 era.

In May 2021, Harvia acquired Kirami, a manufacturer of hot tub heaters, and in August, Sauna-Eurox, a sauna stone company. Between March 2020 and August 2021, Harvia's share price increased by as much as 580 percentage. The company's turnover was 170 million euros. The expansion of the heater factory in Muurame was completed.

In spring 2022, Harvia suspended its operations in Russia after the invasion of Ukraine. Russia had accounted for 6.4% of turnover in the previous year, with 27 employees but no production facilities. In the summer, Harvia bought the remaining shares in Germany's EOS. Harvia withdrew from the Russian market. and in November it was agreed to sell EOS Russia to its CEO.

The sale of EOS Russia to its CEO was completed in March 2023.

In June 2023, Matias Järnefelt became the company's new CEO. In September, Harvia acquired Phoenix El-Mec srl from Italy, which had long manufactured electromechanical timers for Harvia’s heaters. By this time, North America accounted for 29% of Harvia's turnover.

Harvia's registered share capital was EUR 80,000 and the company had issued 18,549,879 fully paid shares (22 March 2018). Harvia has one share series, and each share entitles the holder to one vote at the company's General Meeting of shareholders. There are no voting restrictions attached to the shares. The shares have no nominal value. The company's shares belong to a book-entry system. At the moment the company does not hold any of its own shares.

== Organization ==
Harvia is headquartered in Muurame in central Finland. The company employed more than 600 people in 2023. The company's organisation is divided into four geographical sales regions: North America, Northern Europe, Continental Europe and Asia, Middle East and Africa. There are five functions at Group level: marketing and brand, products and solutions, innovation and technology, production and support. In 2018, more than 20 percent of employees owned shares in the company.

The company has import facilities in Muurame, Germany, Romania, China and the United States. In addition to heaters, Muurame manufactures wooden heater frames and hot tub heaters.

Harvia and Bergman have a joint venture in Japan that markets Harvia products through showrooms. Harvia holds 51 percent of the company.

Harvia's largest shareholders in 2024 were Onvest, WestStar, Evli, Nordea and Tiipeti.

== Products and markets ==
Harvia manufactures sauna heaters, saunas and sauna accessories. The company has produced wood-burning heaters since the 1950s and electric heaters since the 1980s. In addition to electric and wood-burning heaters, Harvia's products include steam sauna products, infrared saunas and accessories. Complete sauna rooms are also exported. In 2020, Harvia accounted for about 3% of the world sauna market and 16% of the heater market.

In 2022, exports will account for 80% of the company's turnover. The main growth markets were the United States and Japan. In the United States, sales are made through online stores and the Costco and Home Depot chains. Other important markets include Italy, Austria, the Nordic countries, France, Germany and Switzerland. In 2020, Harvia products were sold in more than 80 countries.

=== Heaters ===
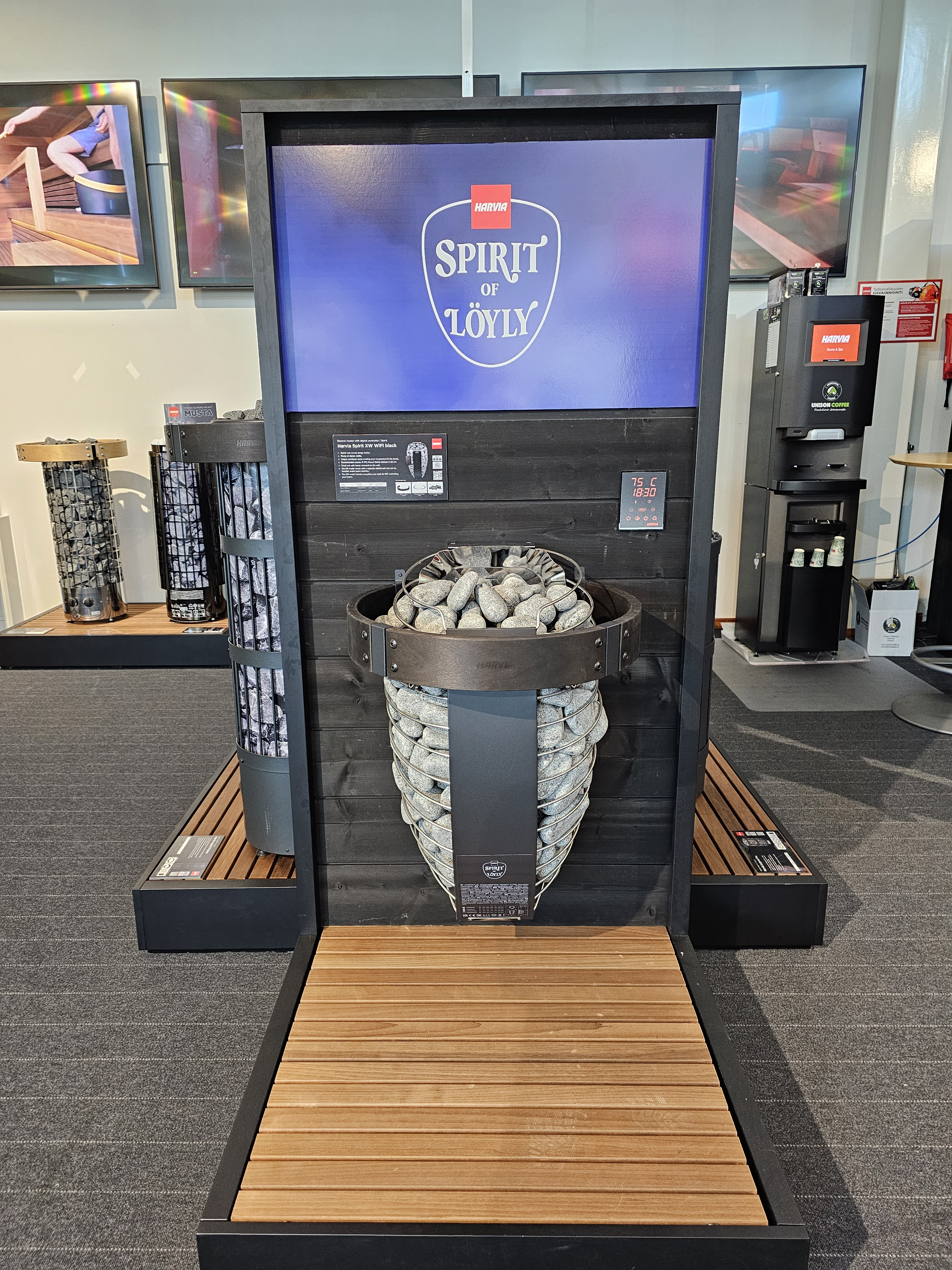
The Harvia spirit heater in Muurame showroom, 2024

Harvia manufactures electric and wood burning heaters. In 2023, wood burning heaters accounted for a third of heaters and all heaters for 55% of turnover. Electric heaters, especially those sold in Central Europe, are often combined with a steam generator to humidify the air in the sauna. The company has more than 300 different heater models.

=== Hybrid saunas ===
Hybrid saunas combine traditional and infrared saunas. The functions of the sauna are controlled by a digital control panel. Hybrid saunas are particularly popular in Central Europe. If you can't wait for the sauna to heat up, the infrared is ready immediately. Hybrid saunas are also sold retrofitted.

=== Steam sauna products ===
Harvia manufactures steam aggregates to make steam for the steam bath. They are sold, for example, in Estonia.

=== Smart products ===
Harvia offers smart heaters and remote-control panels. The heater safety switch prevents the heater from starting remotely if, for example, there is laundry on it. Wi-Fi controlled heaters are sold in markets like the United States and Japan.

=== Saunas ===
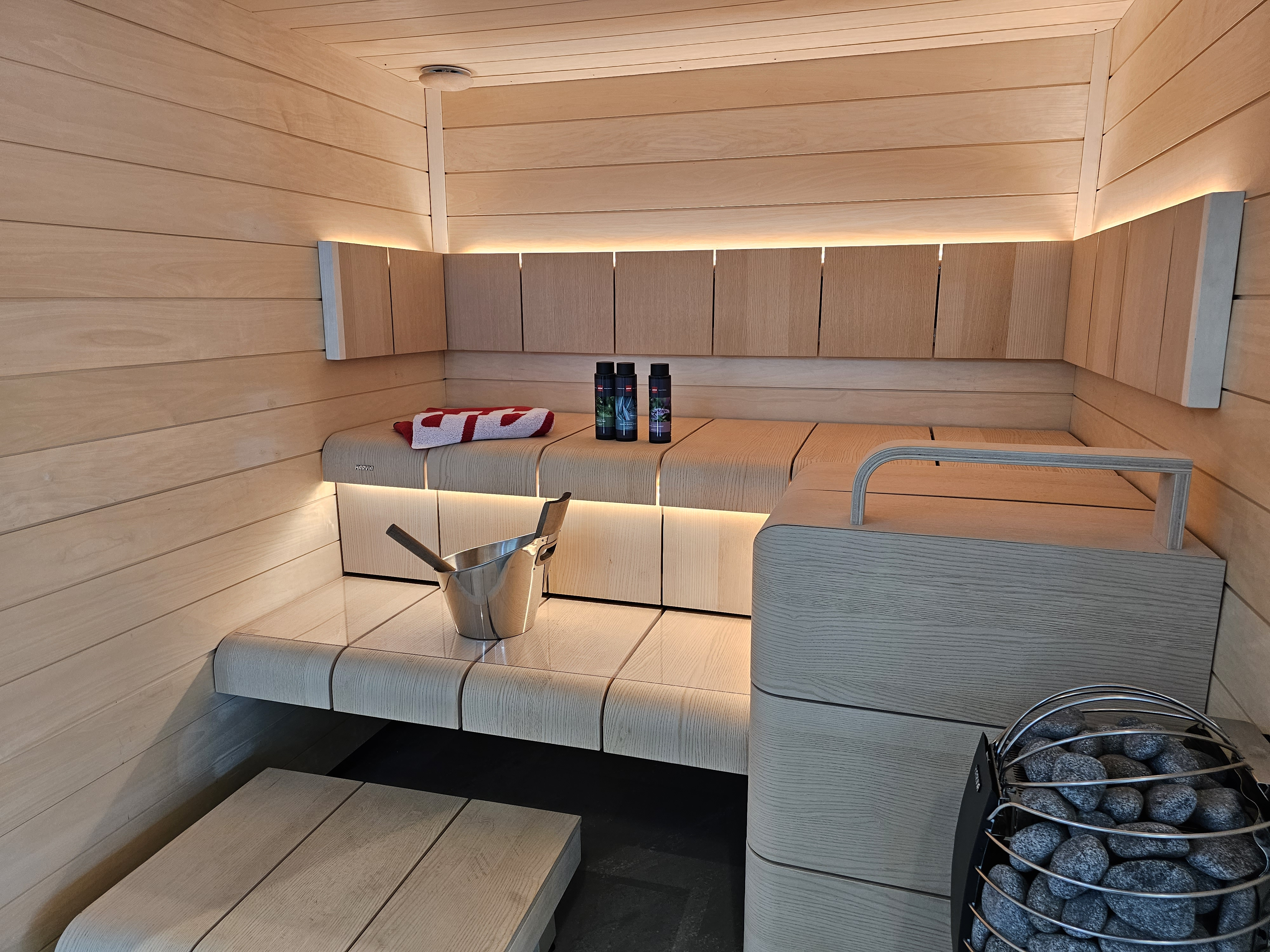
Harvia Ventura sauna cabin

Harvia sells complete sauna rooms and residential sauna modules are manufactured in the United States under the Almost Heaven Saunas brand.

=== Other products ===
Harvia also sells sauna accessories, buckets, wooden racks, clothes hangers, fire chambers, heater stones, menthol sauna crystals and sauna fragrances. Bath barrels were added to Harvia's range when it acquired Kiram from Sastamala in 2021. Phoenix El-Mec, owned by Harvia, manufactures electromechanical timers for several European consumer brands, including furnaces, drying ovens and boilers.

== Governance ==
Harvia's governance and management commits to the Finnish Limited Liability Companies Act and Securities Markets Act, as well as the company's articles of association, the charters of the board of directors and audit committee of Harvia and the rules and regulations of the Helsinki Stock Exchange, rules and guidelines of the Financial Supervisory Authority as well as the Corporate Governance Code for Finnish Listed Companies set by the Securities Market Association. Their important markets include Italy, Austria, the Nordic countries, France, Germany and Switzerland. In 2020, Harvia products were sold in more than 80 countries.

== Recognitions ==
- In 2000 Harvia received the national entrepreneur award in Finland.
- In 2011, Risto Harvia was named Business Leader of the Year in Finland.
- In 2020 Harvia received the Internationalization Award from the president of Finland.
