= Vesankajärvi =

Lake in Jyväskylä

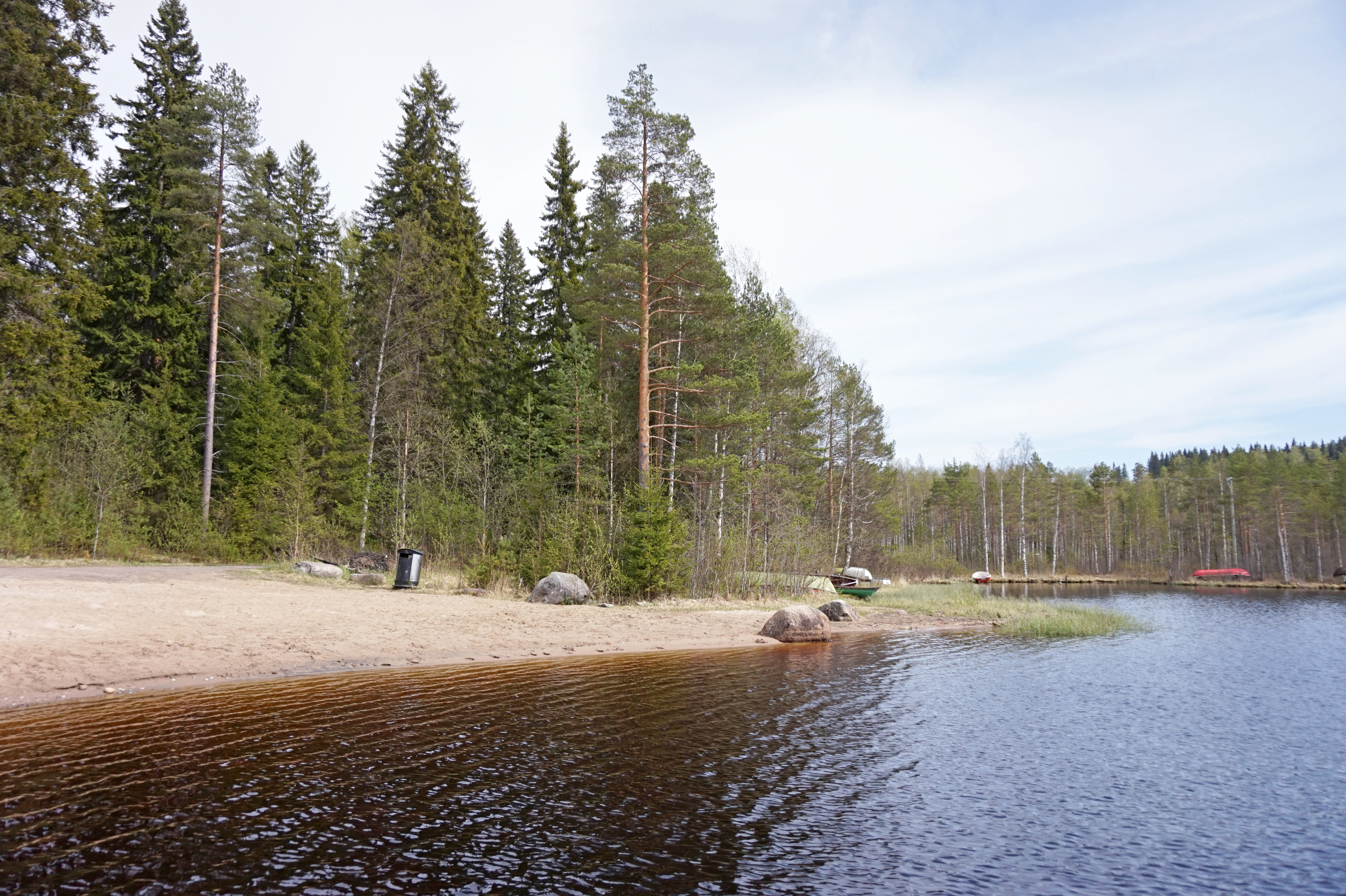
- Beach on Vesankajärvi in 2017
- Interactive map of Vesankajärvi
- Location: Jyväskylä
- Coordinates: 62.279°N 25.548°E
- Catchment area: 52.6 km^{2} (20.3 sq mi)
- Basin countries: Finland
- Surface area: 2.03 km^{2} (0.78 sq mi)
- Average depth: 5.05 m (16.6 ft)
- Max. depth: 22 m (72 ft)
- Water volume: 10,247,330 cubic meters (13,403,000 cu yd)
- Shore length^{1}: 15.314 km (9.516 mi)
- Surface elevation: 146 m (479 ft)
- Islands: 4
- ^{1} Shore length is not a well-defined measure.

Vesankajärvi is a lake in Jyväskylä, Finland, covering an area of 2.03 square kilometers (0.78 sq mi). It is part of the Muuratjärvi catchment area and discharges into lake Vähä-Vesanka. The village of Vesanka is largely located on its shores.

== Geography ==
Vesankajärvi has an area of 2.03 square kilometers (0.78 sq mi) and a volume of 10.25 million cubic meters (13,410,000 cu yd). It has multiple peninsulas, clockwise starting from the north called Kiponniemi, Mellanniemi, Karttustenniemi, Kanervaniemi and Tapaninniemi, dividing sections of the lake into bays. In the south, Karttustenniemi and the Haapamäki–Jyväskylä railway separate a section known as Väli-Vesanka from the rest of the lake. The lake has four islands: Pieni Sikosaari and Iso Sikosaari in the north, Kuoliosaari in the middle and an unnamed island in the southeast. The average depth is 5.05 meters (16.6 ft), while the maximum depth is 22 meters (72 ft). The deepest point lies west of Kiponniemi.

The most densely built parts of the village of Vesanka are located on the lake's southern and eastern shores. The Finnish national road 18/23 passes near the southern shore.

Vesankajärvi has a catchment area of 52.6 square kilometers (20.3 sq mi). The lakes Koveroinen and Saarijärvi discharge into the northern part of the lake, the former having a catchment area of 30.6 km^{2} (11.8 sq mi), while the latter has one covering 11.3 km^{2} (4.4 sq mi). Two smaller lakes, Ykshaukinen and Valkolampi, also discharge directly into Vesankajärvi. Vesankajärvi itself flows into Vähä-Vesanka, to which it is connected by a strait at the western part of Väli-Vesanka. The surface elevation of both lakes is about 146 meters (479 ft). The lakes are part of the catchment area of Muuratjärvi, which in turn flows into Päijänne.

== Environmental values ==
=== Water quality ===
Based on data collected between 1971 and 2015, the water of Vesankajärvi has a color value of 85 mg Pt/liter, a chemical oxygen demand of 13 mg O_{2}/liter, a pH of 6.6, an iron content of 430 μg/l, an aluminum content of 160 μg/l, an electrical conductivity of 3.3 mS/m, an ammoniacal nitrogen content of 5 μg/l and a phosphorus content of 18 μg/l. Nutrient levels are affected by peat extraction at the Valkeissuo bog at the border with Petäjävesi, though as the wastewater passes through multiple bodies of water before reaching Vesankajärvi, the effects are fairly minor.

The average fecal coliform and Enterococcus content, based on samples taken between 1974 and 2014, was 22 per 100 ml and 1 per 100 ml (3.5 imp fl oz; 3.4 US fl oz), respectively.

=== Fishing ===
Between 2005 and 2014, a total of 5,435 zander, 4,272 common whitefish and 750 European crayfish were stocked into Vesankajärvi. Historically, brown trout from Päijänne would migrate up the watercourse via Muuratjärvi into Vesankajärvi, but the route has since been obstructed by weirs.

== History ==
The name of Vesankajärvi was first attested in 1561 as vesangaerffui, in this context referring to the village of Vesanka. It is derived from the word vesa 'shoot' with a toponymic suffix -nka. Alternatively, a Sámi origin has sometimes been suggested, though no potential etymology seems to have ever been provided. However, linguist Ante Aikio proposes that the name of the Mellanniemi peninsula may contain a descendant of Proto-Sámi *miellē 'sandbank' (whence e.g. Northern Sámi mielli).

Based on its name, Kuoliosaari may have been used as a burial place by the villagers of Vesanka before a church was built in Jyväskylä in the 1670s. Until then, the closest churches were located in Jämsä and Laukaa, but transporting dead bodies to either one would have been difficult. Three confirmed burial islands, all named Kuoliosaari, have been found in Petäjävesi, in Iso-Mustiainen, Ala-Kintaus and lake Petäjävesi.
