= Muurame church =

- Muurame church
- Muuramen kirkko
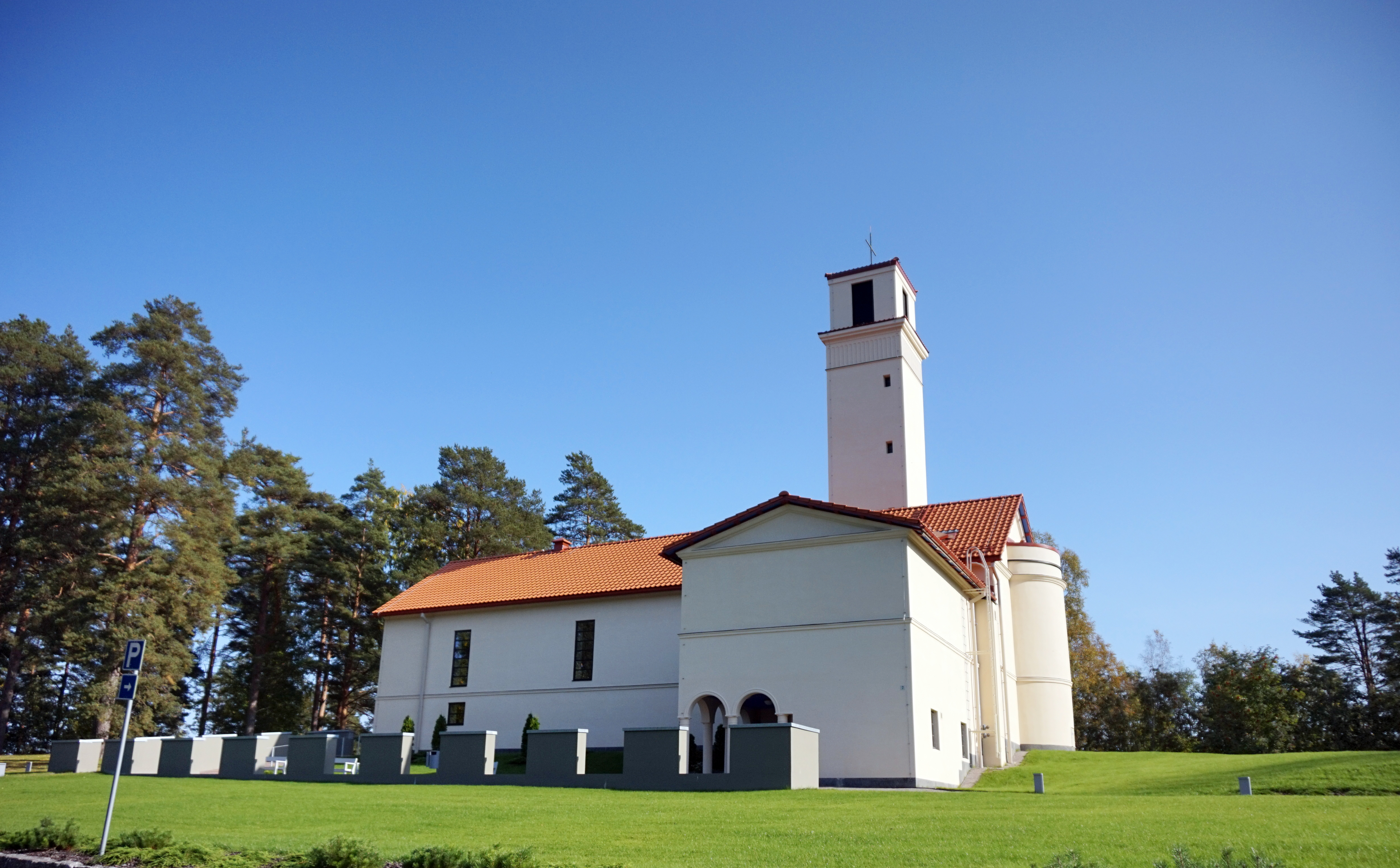
- Muurame church in 2017
- Muurame church
- 62.125116°N 25.664287°E
- Location: Muurame
- Country: Finland
- Denomination: Lutheran

History
- Status: Parish church

Architecture
- Functional status: Active
- Architect: Alvar Aalto
- Architectural type: Nordic Classicism
- Completed: 1929

Specifications
- Materials: Brick (plastered)

Administration
- Parish: Muurame parish

Muurame church, located in Muurame, central Finland, was designed by the Finnish architect Alvar Aalto, and completed in 1929.

== Architecture ==
It was the first Aalto-designed church, and the only one of his many church designs in the 1920s, to be built, and represents his transition from Nordic Classicism to the Functionalist style he is mostly known for. As a transitional work, the Muurame church has been undervalued among Aalto's designs by many critics, and even the architect himself called it his 'aberration of youth' (nuoruudensynti).

The church's elongated-nave, single-aisle design and campanile (belfry) were influenced by Aalto's honeymoon trip to Italy a few years earlier, and the churches he saw there.

== Renovation ==
The church was comprehensively restored in 2016 to its original design. Most notably, the interior colour scheme was changed from its pre-renovation white and light wood — often associated with Aalto's minimalist style — to the original, more colourful one, consisting of bright blue and red ceiling and dark grey fixtures. The rose garden in the courtyard was also restored.

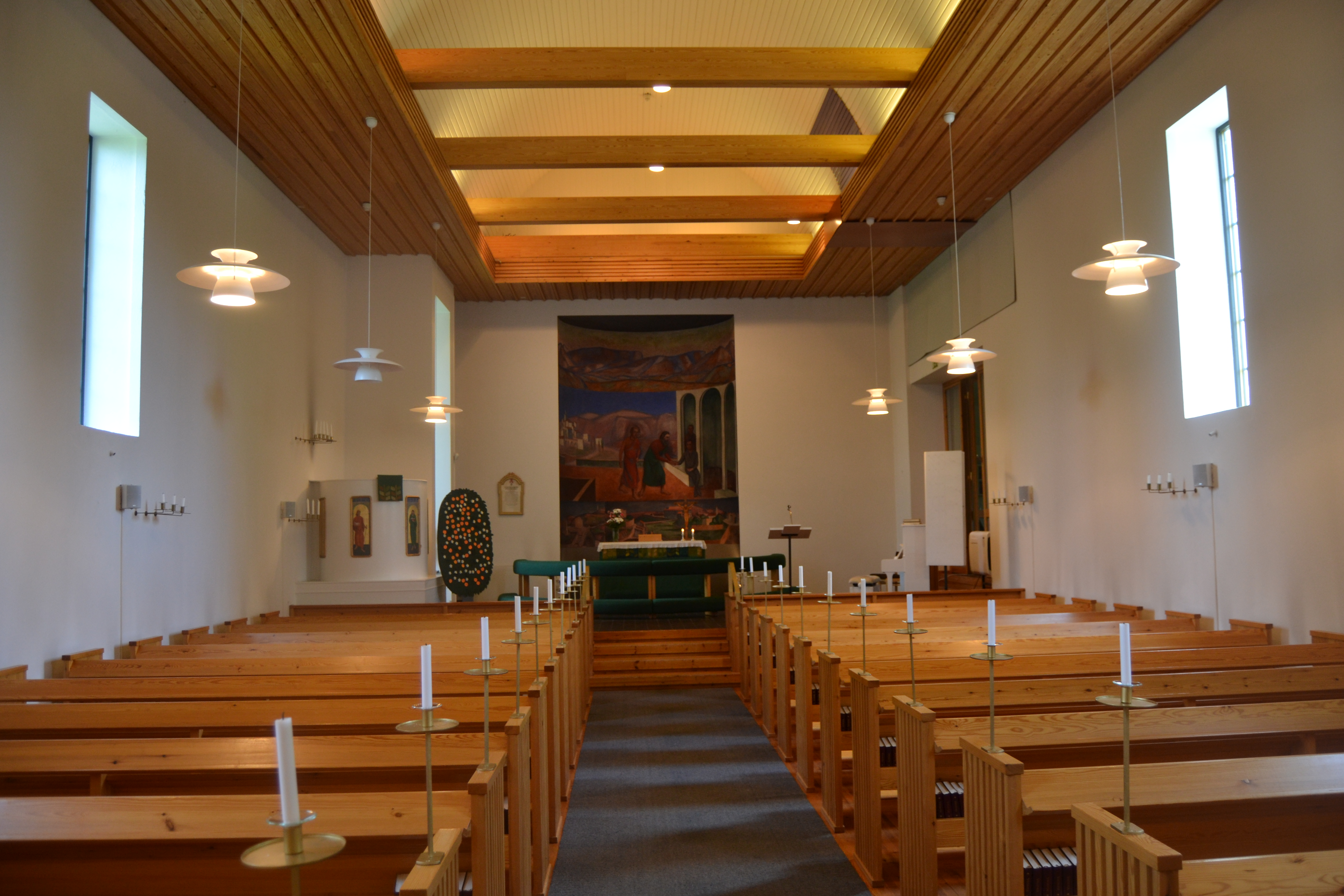
Interior of Muurame Church in 2013

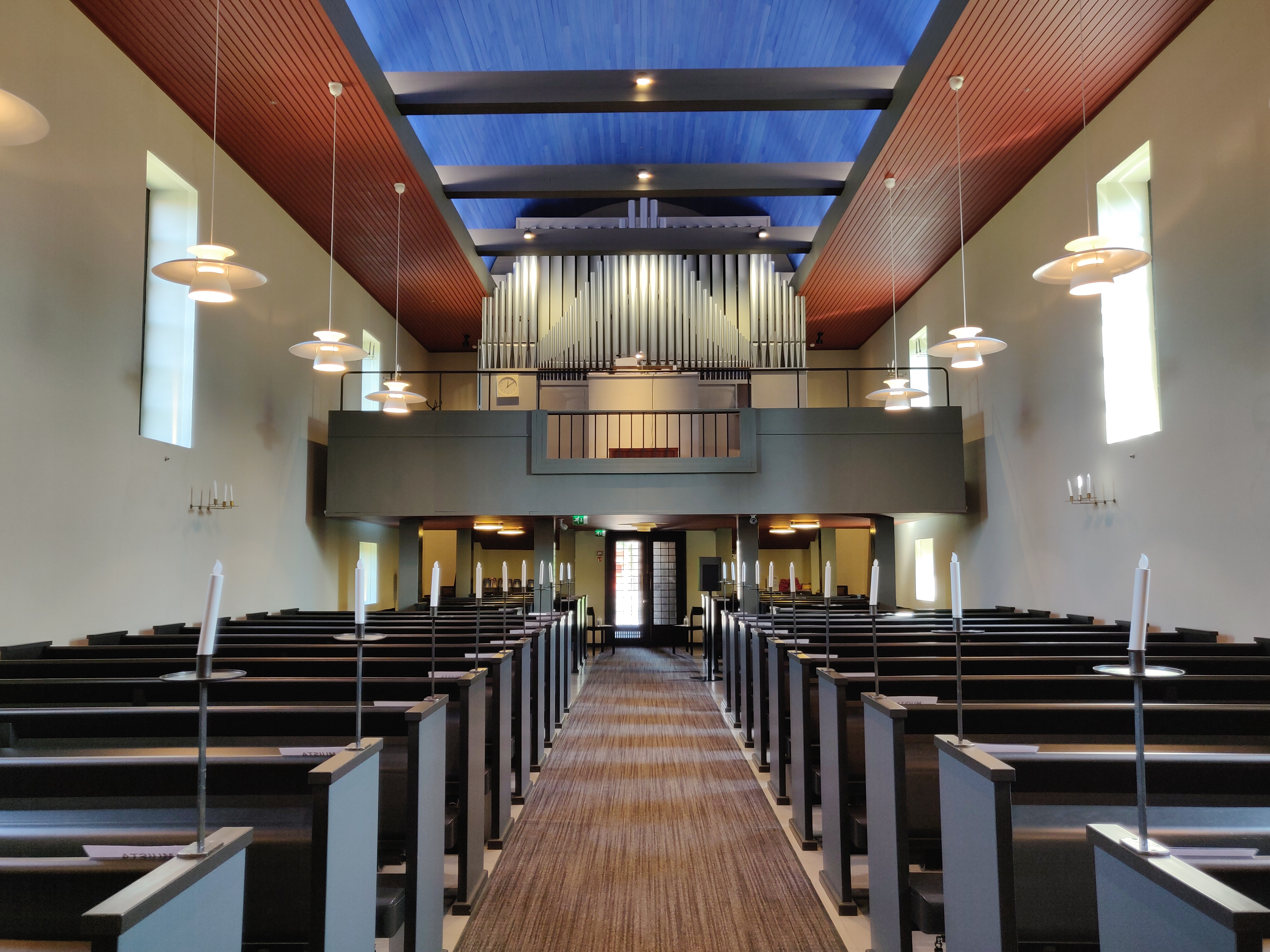
Interior of Muurame Church in 2020

Muurame church interior before (left, viewed towards the chancel) and after (right, viewed towards the entrance, with the organ above) the 2016 renovation which restored the original colour scheme.
