= Koveroinen (Jyväskylä) =

Lake in Jyväskylä

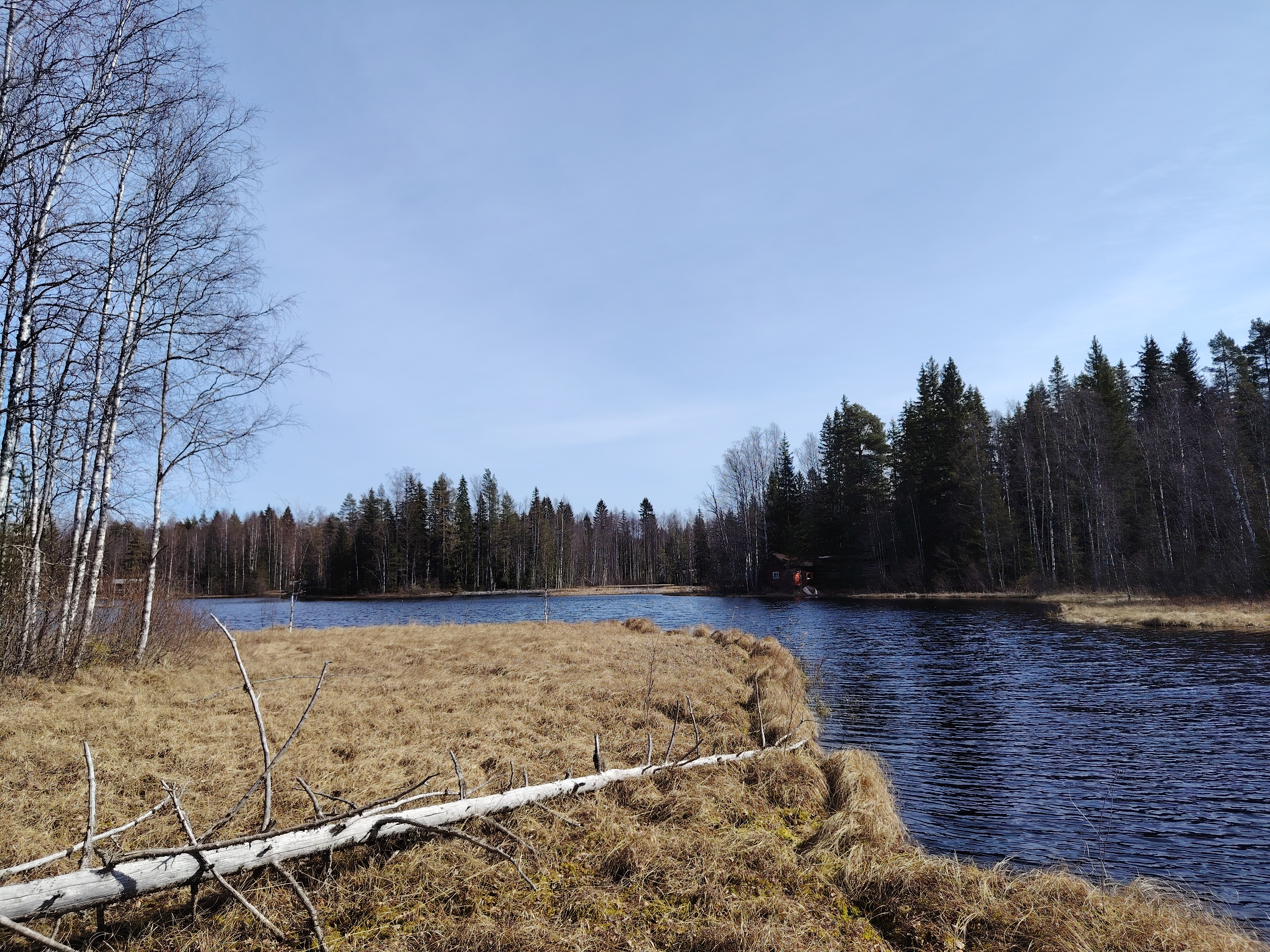
- Koveroinen in April 2026
- Interactive map of Koveroinen
- Location: Jyväskylä
- Coordinates: 62.296°N 25.543°E
- Primary inflows: Suolijoki, Turvakkojoki
- Primary outflows: Kaivantojoki
- Catchment area: 30.61 km^{2} (11.82 sq mi)
- Basin countries: Finland
- Surface area: 15.211 ha (37.59 acres)
- Average depth: 1.72 m (5.6 ft)
- Max. depth: 4.1 m (13 ft)
- Water volume: 261,400 cubic meters (341,900 cu yd)
- Shore length^{1}: 5.038 km (3.130 mi)
- Surface elevation: 148.5 m (487 ft)
- Islands: 6
- ^{1} Shore length is not a well-defined measure.

Koveroinen is a lake in Jyväskylä, Finland, located in the northern part of the village of Vesanka. It has an area of about 15 hectares (37 acres) and its waters flow into Vesankajärvi to its south.

== Geography ==
Koveroinen has an area of 15.211 hectares (37.59 acres) and a volume of 261,400 cubic meters (341,900 cu yd). It comprises two basins: the main basin and the smaller Pieni-Koveroinen, which are connected by a narrow strait. The former consists of multiple narrow bays, while the latter has a more even shape. Despite its fairly small size, the lake has six islands, four of which are located in the main section and two in Pieni-Koveroinen. The lake's average depth is 1.72 meters (5.6 ft), while the maximum depth is 5.5 meters (18 ft). The deepest point is located in the middle of Pieni-Koveroinen.

The lake is located north of the village center of Vesanka, west of the road 16683 between Vesanka and Nyrölä. Buildings by the lake are concentrated on its eastern shore.

Koveroinen has a catchment area of 30.61 square kilometers (11.82 sq mi). It is fed by two rivers: Suolijoki starting from Kolujärvi to the north, and Turvakkojoki from Kinnaslampi to the west. Suolijoki drains an area of 17.68 km^{2} (6.83 sq mi), including multiple lakes further north between the villages of Nyrölä and Vertaala, such as Vasarainen and Iso-Musta. Turvakkojoki drains an area of 12.06 km^{2} (4.66 sq mi), including much of the Valkeissuo bog at the border with Petäjävesi. Koveroinen itself discharges into Vesankajärvi via a short stream (named Kaivantojoki) beginning from the western part of Pieni-Koveroinen. The surface level of Koveroinen is about 148.5 meters (487 ft), which is 2.5 meters higher than that of Vesankajärvi.

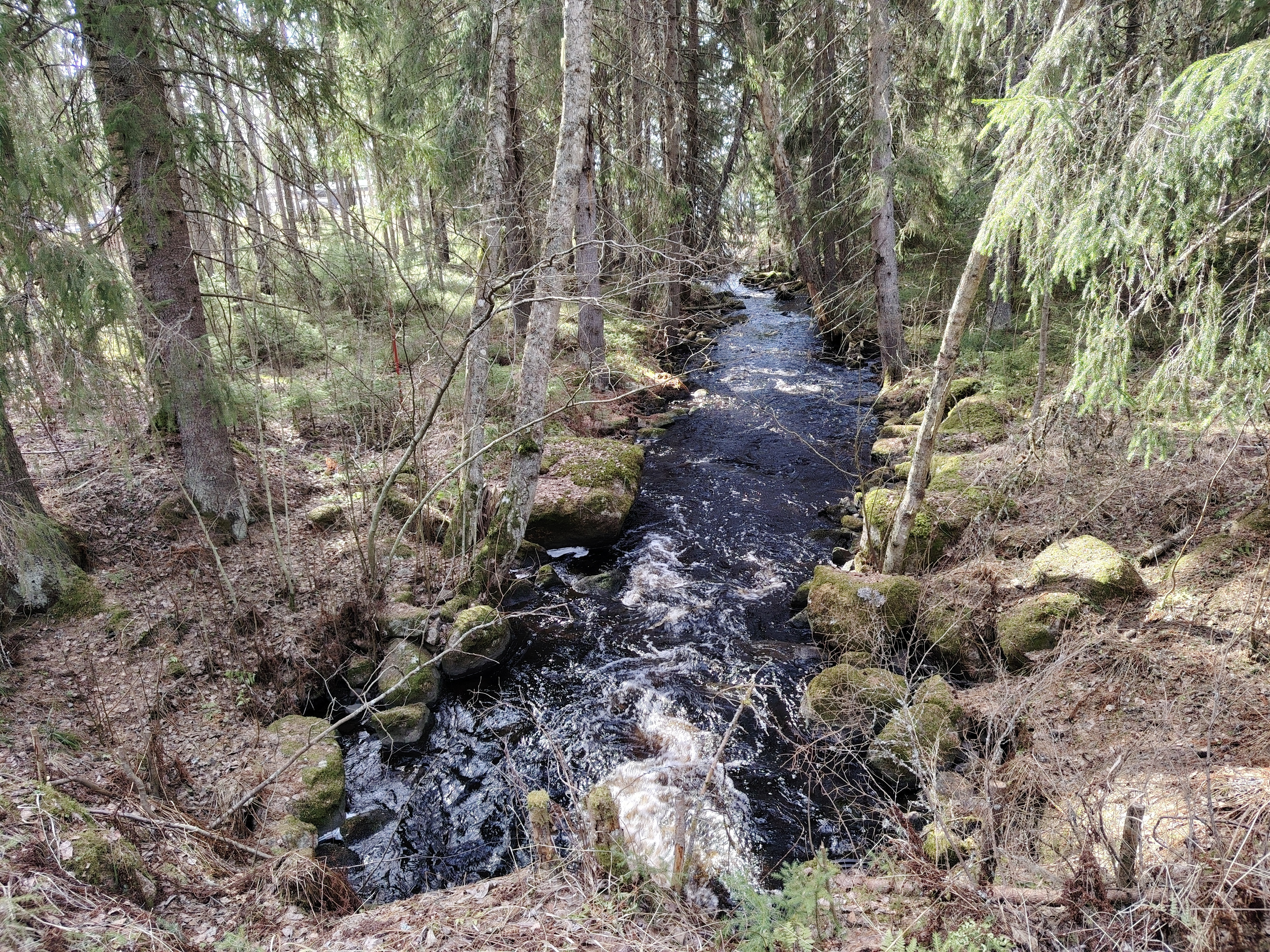
Kaivantojoki flowing into Vesankajärvi

== Water quality ==
Peat extraction at the Valkeissuo bog farther up the catchment area causes nutrient loading in Koveroinen. Based on data collected between 1971 and 2015, the average ammoniacal nitrogen level of the lake is 47 μg/l (2.7×10^{−8} oz/cu in), while its phosphorus level is 21 μg/l (1.2×10^{−8} oz/cu in) in the winter and 26 μg/l (1.5×10^{−8} oz/cu in) in the summer. During average flow conditions, the total nitrogen content increases by 92 μg/l (5.3×10^{−8} oz/cu in), while the phosphorus content increases by 2.5 μg/l (1.4×10^{−9} oz/cu in).

== History ==
During the Finnish famine of 1866–1868, the levels of Koveroinen and Vasarainen were lowered by about four meters to create more horsetail and sedge meadows, for feeding livestock, on their shores. Until then, most water from Koveroinen flowed into Saarijärvi and only then into Vesankajärvi, though a small secondary outlet flowing directly into Vesankajärvi also existed. The level of Koveroinen was lowered by widening the latter stream, thenceforth known as Kaivantojoki, causing the former to dry up soon after. As a result, a watermill that was located on Saarijärvi's own outlet became unusable.
