= Muurame =

- Municipality
- Muuramen kunta Muurame kommun
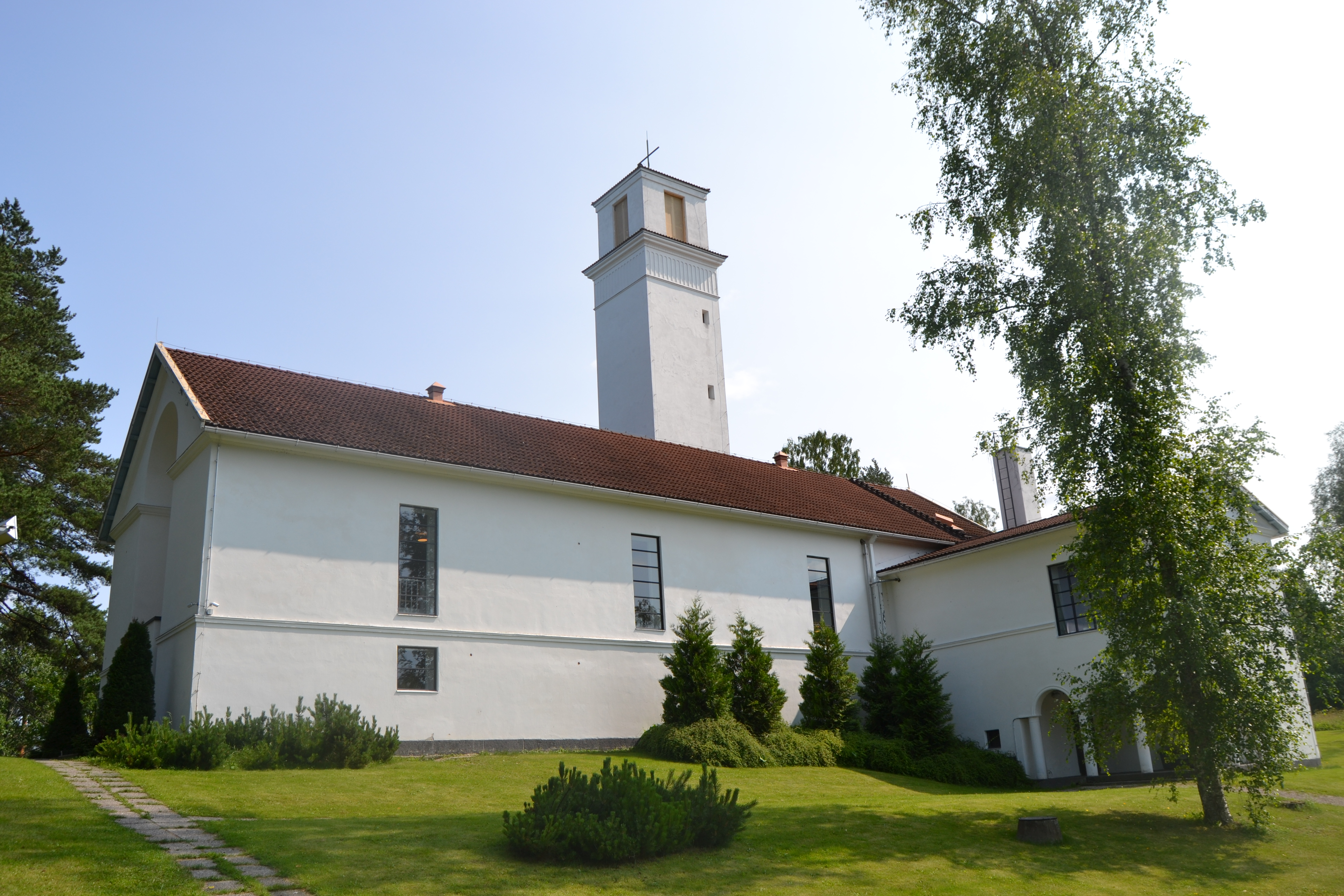
- Muurame church, designed by Alvar Aalto

- Flag Coat of arms

- Location of Muurame in Finland
- Interactive map of Muurame
- Coordinates: 62°08′N 025°40.5′E
- Country: Finland
- Region: Central Finland
- Sub-region: Jyväskylä
- Charter: 1921

Government
  - Municipal manager: Jarkko Määttänen

Area (2018-01-01)
  - Total: 194.05 km^{2} (74.92 sq mi)
  - Land: 144.06 km^{2} (55.62 sq mi)
  - Water: 49.99 km^{2} (19.30 sq mi)
  - Rank: 280th largest in Finland

Population (2025-12-31)
  - Total: 10,646
  - Rank: 91st largest in Finland
  - Density: 73.9/km^{2} (191/sq mi)

Population by native language
  - Finnish: 97.5% (official)
  - Swedish: 0.2%
  - Others: 2.3%

Population by age
  - 0 to 14: 21.5%
  - 15 to 64: 59.7%
  - 65 or older: 18.8%
- Time zone: UTC+02:00 (EET)
  - Summer (DST): UTC+03:00 (EEST)
- Website: www.muurame.fi

Muurame is a municipality of Finland, located 16 kilometres (10 mi) south-west of Jyväskylä, the regional capital of Central Finland. Muurame itself is located between two lakes, Lake Päijänne and Lake Muuratjärvi. These two lakes are connected to each other via River Muurame. Altogether there are 37 lakes in Muurame. The biggest lakes beside Päijänne are Muuratjärvi and Lake Kuusjärvi. River Muurame streams through the population center of Muurame, which was founded in 1921.

Today Muurame shares a land border only with Jyväskylä. Before 2009, its neighboring municipalities were, in addition to Jyväskylä, the Rural Municipality of Jyväskylä and Korpilahti, and before 1993 also Säynätsalo. Säynätsalo was consolidated with the city of Jyväskylä in 1993, and the Rural Municipality of Jyväskylä and Korpilahti in 2009. Muurame still shares a water boundary not only with Jyväskylä but also with Toivakka.

The Muurame church is of Alvar Aalto's design, being his first church design to be completed in 1929. It was comprehensively restored in 2016 to its original design.

== Name ==
Muurame is a dialectal word referring to the cloudberry, which also can be seen in the municipal coat of arms. Similar toponyms nearby include Muuratsalo, Muuratjärvi, Muuramenlampi and Muuratharju.

== Geography ==
=== Statistical areas ===
Muurame is divided into 17 statistical areas: Hautalanmäki, Isolahti, Jaakkola, Keskusta, Kinkomaa, Kotiranta-Paavalinvuori, Muuramenharju, Muuratsalo, Niittyaho, Pitkälä-Riihiniemi, Rajala-Sulunsalmi, Rannankylä, Saarenkylä, Teollisuuskylä, Velkapohja, Verkkoniemi and Vihtalahti-Härköpohja.

== History ==
Muurame was originally a part of Jämsä. There were also external hunting grounds of Pälkäne in the area. In 1539, there were four farms in Muurame: two of the estates paid taxes to Jämsä, while the other two were taxed from Pälkäne.

Korpilahti, including Muurame, was separated from Jämsä in 1861. Muurame was in turn separated from Korpilahti in 1921. Säynätsalo was separated from Muurame ecclesiastically in 1922 and administratively in 1924.

== Notable people ==
=== Athletes ===
- Emilia Nyström, Finnish beach volleyball
- Erika Nyström, Finnish beach volleyball
- Jussi Pesonen, ice hockey player
- Harri Pesonen, ice hockey player
- Mikko Ronkainen, Freestyle skier

== Twinnings ==
- Alatskivi Parish, Estonia
- Vinje Municipality, Norway

== See also ==
- Muuratsalo
