= Muuratjärvi =

Lake in Central Finland

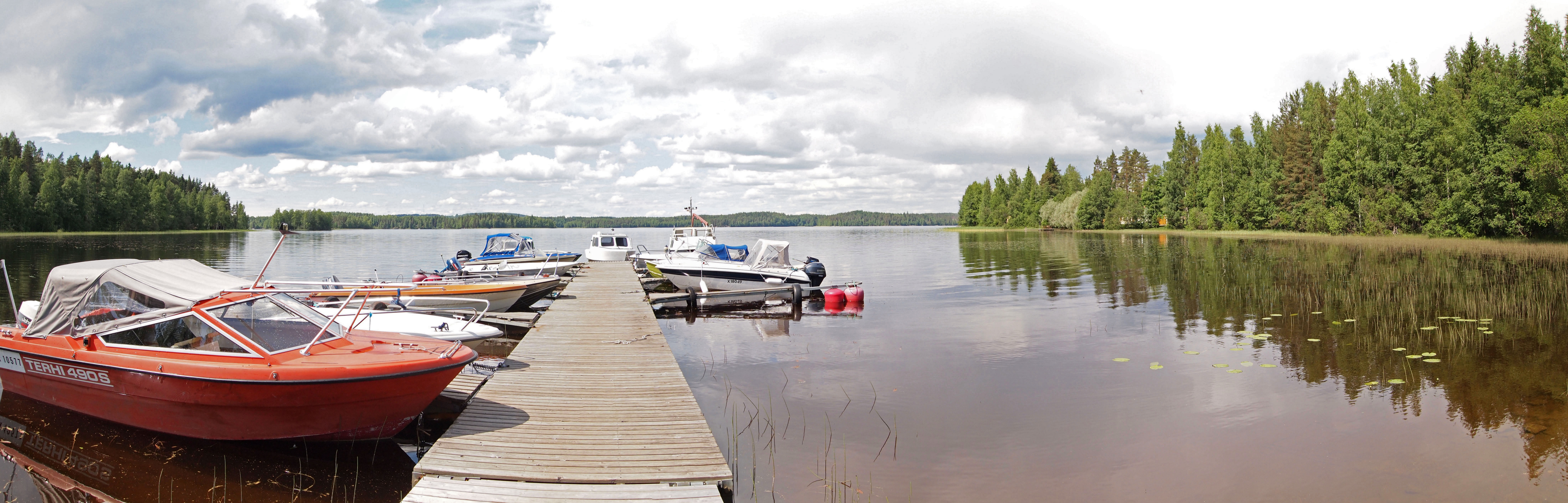
- Muuratjärvi in Muurame

- Location within Central Finland
- Location: Muurame, Jyväskylä
- Coordinates: 62°08′N 025°33′E
- Primary inflows: Myllyjoki, Mattilanjoki
- Primary outflows: Muuratjoki
- Catchment area: Kymijoki
- Basin countries: Finland
- Surface area: 32 km^{2} (12 sq mi)
- Average depth: 13.47 m (44.2 ft)
- Max. depth: 42.6 m (140 ft)
- Water volume: 0.425 km^{3} (345,000 acre⋅ft)
- Shore length^{1}: 112.2 km (69.7 mi)
- Surface elevation: 90.1 m (296 ft)
- Frozen: December–April
- Settlements: Muurame, Tikkala, Saukkola
- ^{1} Shore length is not a well-defined measure.

Muuratjärvi is a lake of Finland in Muurame and Korpilahti, the latter being part of Jyväskylä since 2009. The lake has a surface area of 32 km^{2}. The lake drains into the Päijänne via the ~1 kilometre (0.6 mi) long Muuratjoki river, which flows through the center of Muurame. The lake has multiple islands, including Vuohensalo, Siikasaari, Konttisaari, Jahko and Raita. Vuohensalo is connected to the mainland via a road.

== See also ==
- List of lakes in Finland
