= Isojärvi =

Isojärvi may refer to:

- Isojärvi (Kuhmoinen), a lake in Finland
- Isojärvi (Satakunta), a lake in Finland
- Isojärvi National Park
