= Padasjoki =

Municipality in Päijät-Häme, Finland

- Municipality
- Padasjoen kunta Padasjoki kommun
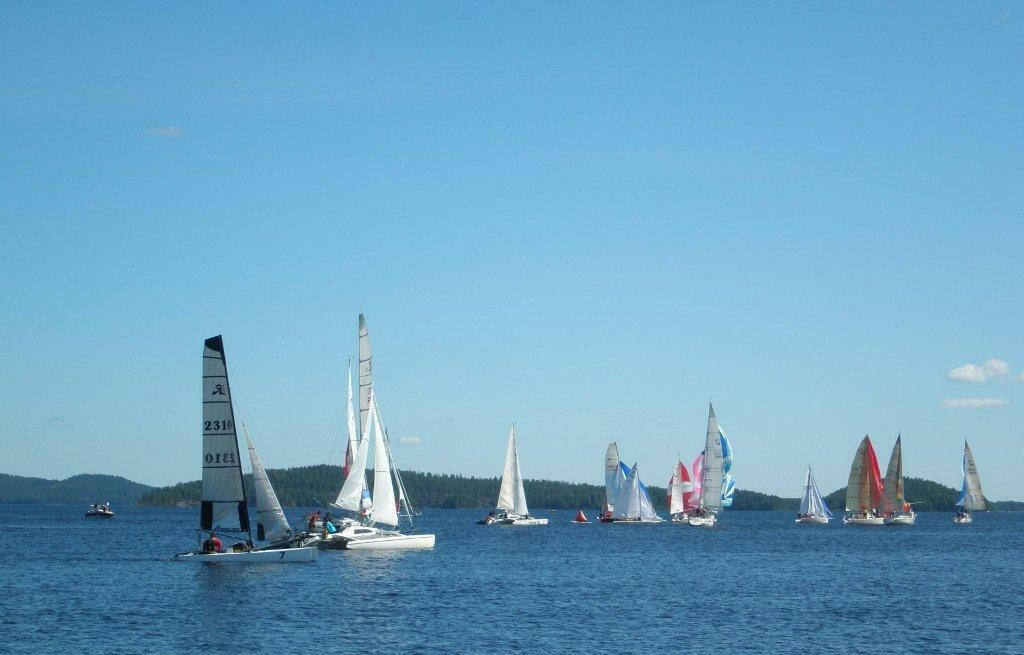

- Coat of arms

- Location of Padasjoki in Finland
- Interactive map of Padasjoki
- Coordinates: 61°21′N 025°16.5′E
- Country: Finland
- Region: Päijät-Häme
- Sub-region: Lahti
- Charter: 1442
- Municipality: 1865

Government
  - Municipal manager: Juha Rehula

Area (2018-01-01)
  - Total: 729.85 km^{2} (281.80 sq mi)
  - Land: 523.09 km^{2} (201.97 sq mi)
  - Water: 206.68 km^{2} (79.80 sq mi)
  - Rank: 167th largest in Finland

Population (2025-12-31)
  - Total: 2,656
  - Rank: 226th largest in Finland
  - Density: 5.08/km^{2} (13.2/sq mi)

Population by native language
  - Finnish: 96.5% (official)
  - Others: 3.5%

Population by age
  - 0 to 14: 10%
  - 15 to 64: 48.7%
  - 65 or older: 41.3%
- Time zone: UTC+02:00 (EET)
  - Summer (DST): UTC+03:00 (EEST)
- Website: www.padasjoki.fi

Padasjoki (Finnish pronunciation: [ˈpɑdɑsˌjoki]) is a municipality of Finland. It is located in the province of Southern Finland and is part of the Päijät-Häme region. It is 53 kilometres (33 mi) from Padasjoki to Lahti and 65 kilometres (40 mi) to Heinola. The municipality has a population of 2,656 (31 December 2025) and covers an area of 729.85 square kilometres (281.80 sq mi) of which 206.68 km^{2} (79.80 sq mi) is water. The population density is 5.08 inhabitants per square kilometre (13.2/sq mi).

The municipality is unilingually Finnish.

Padasjoki is known as a summer cottage municipality. By number, it has more holiday homes than permanent residents.

== History ==
The earliest information on the administrative parish of Padasjoki is from 1442. Most of the villages of Padasjoki were established during the Middle Ages, being mentioned in sources from the 15th century.

In 2020, Padasjoki was the setting of a video and choral tribute by the YL Male Voice Choir to the song "Pohjois-Karjala", by Leevi and the Leavings and Gösta Sundqvist. The video, seen over 100,000 times in a single day, credits the city of Padasjoki as well as some local businesses and features several rural views including a farm, swamps, a wooden bus stop, a barber shop and a Matkahuolto station with a visible "Padasjoki" sign.

== Sights and events ==
In February, Padasjoki hosts 7.5 km long annual full moon skiing event and competition on the frozen Lake Päijänne. In March there is another skiing event on Lake Päijänne called Postihiihto. Week before midsummer it is time for annual nude run event Nakukymppi held in Vesijako village. During the first weekend of July Sahtimarkkinat a home-brewed beer market is held in Padasjoki village centre. The Padasjoki Marina also loans itself every second year as the starting point for a sailing competition (Päijännepurjehdus).

=== Museums ===
- Enni Ids Cabin
- The Granary Museum
- The Palsa Mill Museum
- The Torittu Village Smithy Museum

=== Art ===
- Gallery Pikantti
- Ala-Savi’s Art
- Ars Arrakoski
- Ars Auttoinen

=== Nature ===
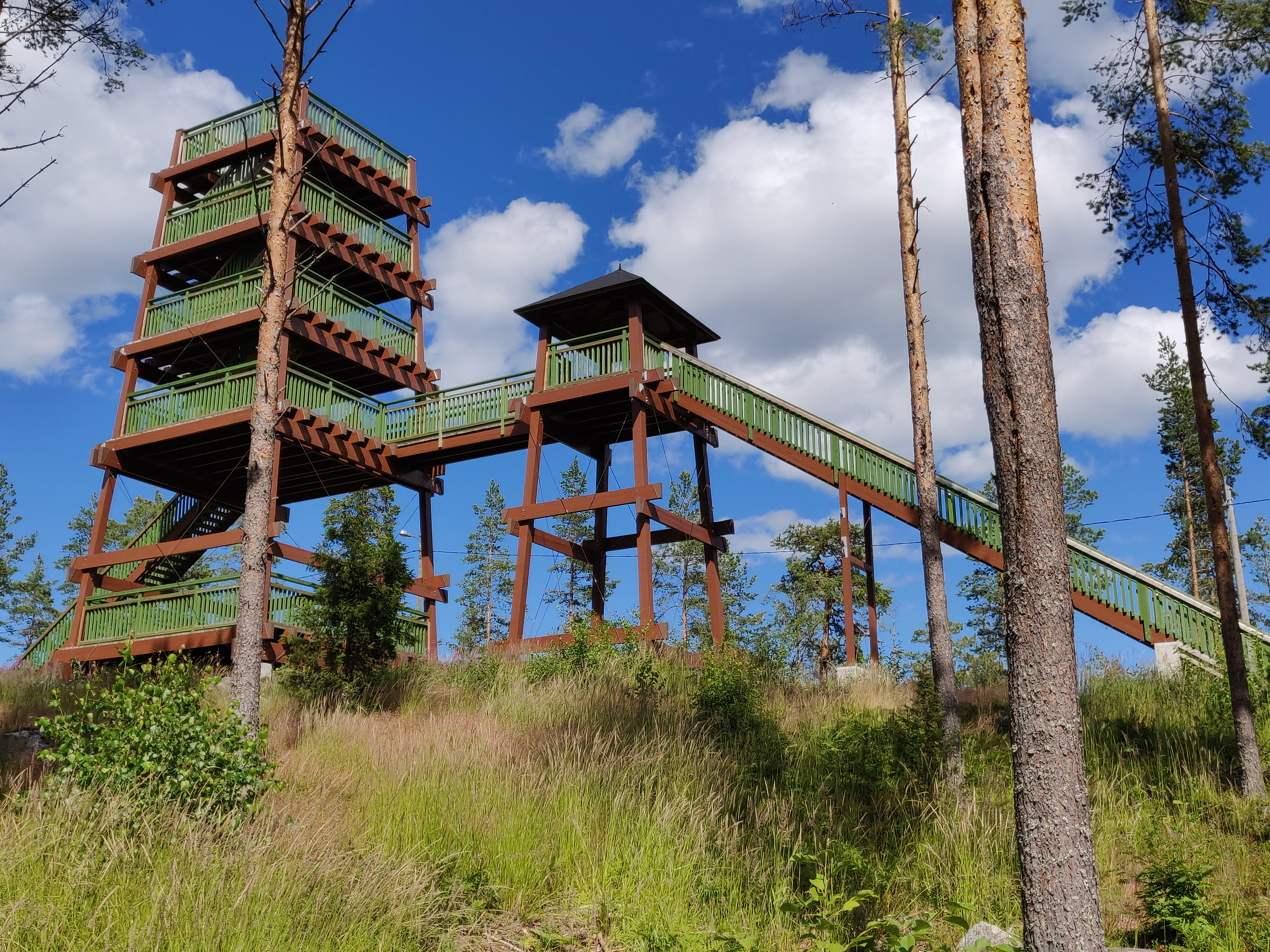
Tuomastornit observation towers

- Päijänne National Park
- Evo Hiking Area
- Tuomastornit observation towers
