= Kuhmoinen =

Kuhmoinen Kuhmois
- Municipality
- Kuhmoisten kunta Kuhmois kommun
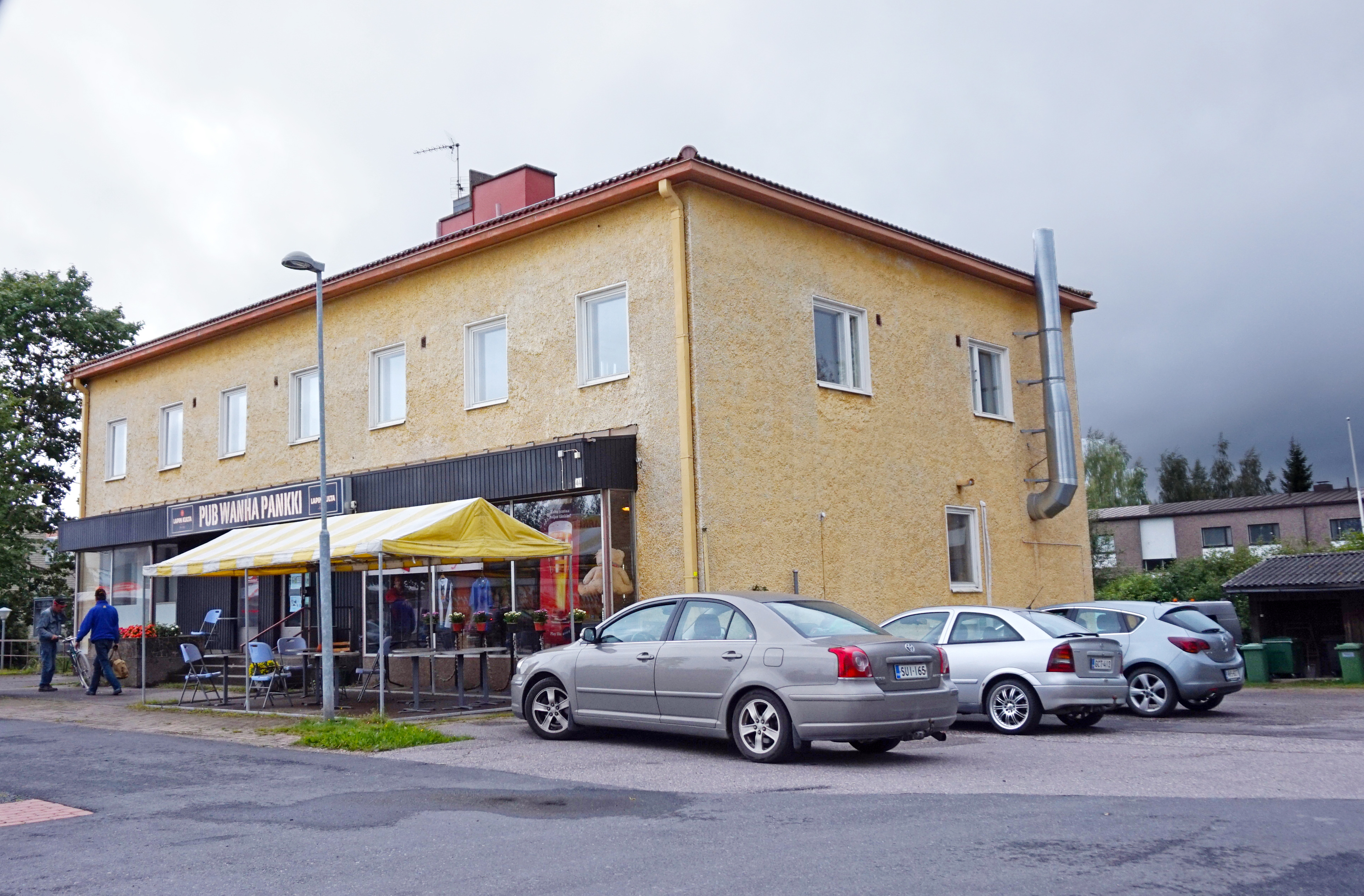
- Restaurant Pub Wanha Pankki in Kuhmoinen

- Coat of arms

- Location of Kuhmoinen in Finland
- Interactive map of Kuhmoinen
- Coordinates: 61°34′N 025°11′E
- Country: Finland
- Region: Pirkanmaa
- Sub-region: Tampere

Government
  - Municipal manager: Anne Heusala

Area (2018-01-01)
  - Total: 936.68 km^{2} (361.65 sq mi)
  - Land: 660.93 km^{2} (255.19 sq mi)
  - Water: 275.74 km^{2} (106.46 sq mi)
  - Rank: 129th largest in Finland

Population (2025-12-31)
  - Total: 1,979
  - Rank: 254th largest in Finland
  - Density: 2.99/km^{2} (7.7/sq mi)

Population by native language
  - Finnish: 97.5% (official)
  - Others: 2.5%

Population by age
  - 0 to 14: 8.1%
  - 15 to 64: 48%
  - 65 or older: 43.9%
- Time zone: UTC+02:00 (EET)
  - Summer (DST): UTC+03:00 (EEST)
- Website: www.kuhmoinen.fi

Kuhmoinen (Swedish: Kuhmois) is a municipality of Finland, in Pirkanmaa region, but until 2021, it was part of the Central Finland region. The municipality is home to 1,979 inhabitants.

Neighbouring municipalities are Jämsä, Kangasala, Luhanka, Orivesi, Padasjoki and Sysmä. The municipality is unilingually Finnish.

Kuhmoinen is a municipality very much preferred by summer residents, and the municipality's population increases fivefold during the summer months.

== Nature ==
There are 316 lakes in Kuhmoinen. Kuhmoinen lies on the west coast of Lake Päijänne. The largest lakes after Päijänne are Vehkajärvi and Isojärvi.

Isojärvi National Park is situated in Kuhmoinen on the south side of Lake Isojärvi.

== History ==
Kuhmoinen was established in the medieval times. It was first mentioned in 1483 as Kuchmois. At the time, it was a part of the Padasjoki parish and a center of a fourth (neljänneskunta) within the parish.

== Twinnings ==
- Puhja Parish, Estonia

== People born in Kuhmoinen ==
- Robert Ruohtula (1853 – 1914)
- Joel Naaralainen (1867 – 1915)

== Gallery ==
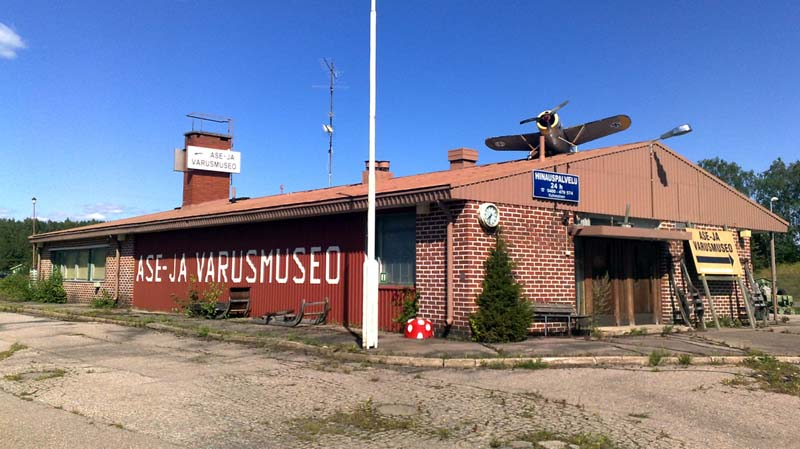
A military museum in Kuhmoinen

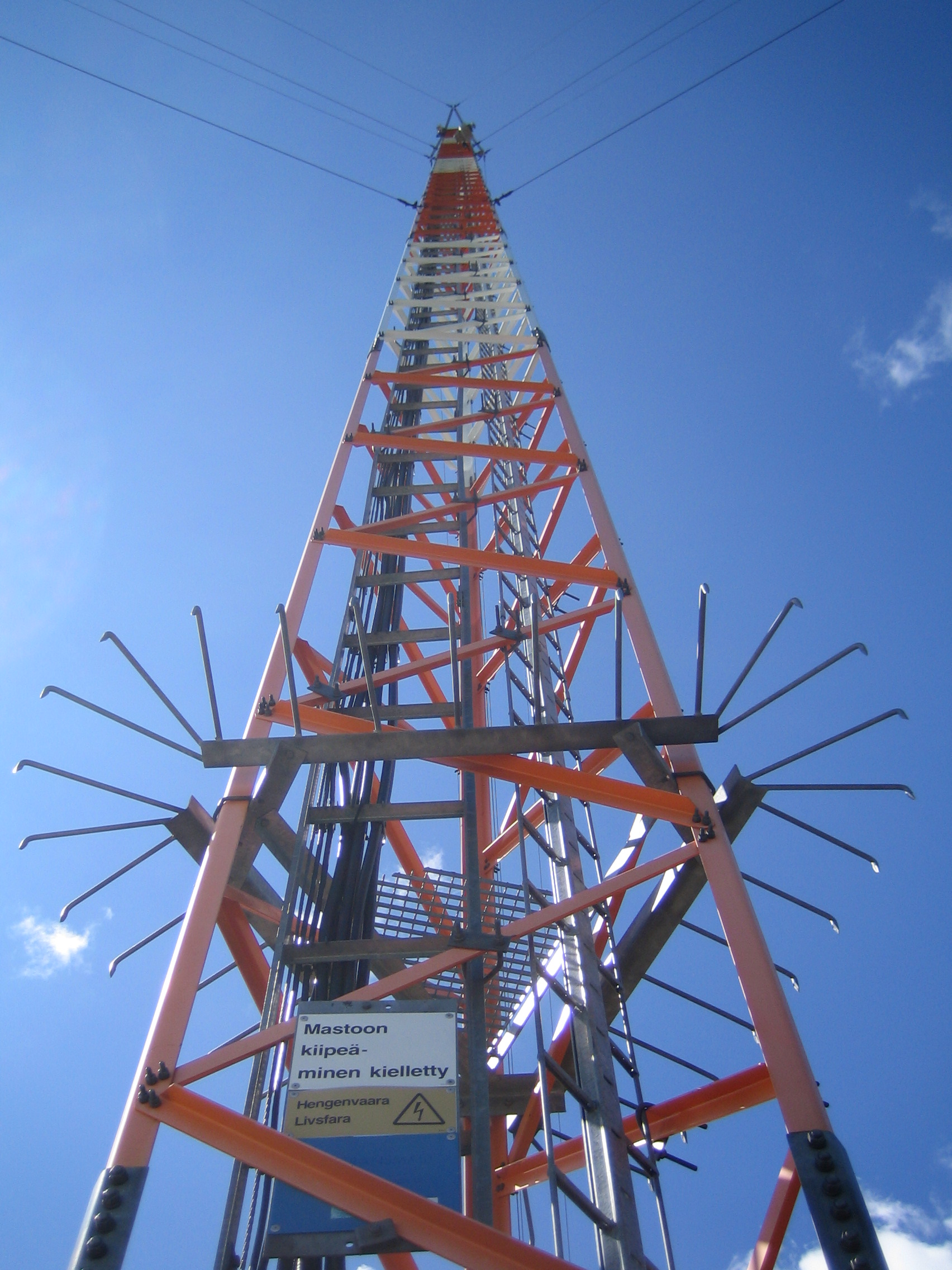
A mast in Kuhmoinen

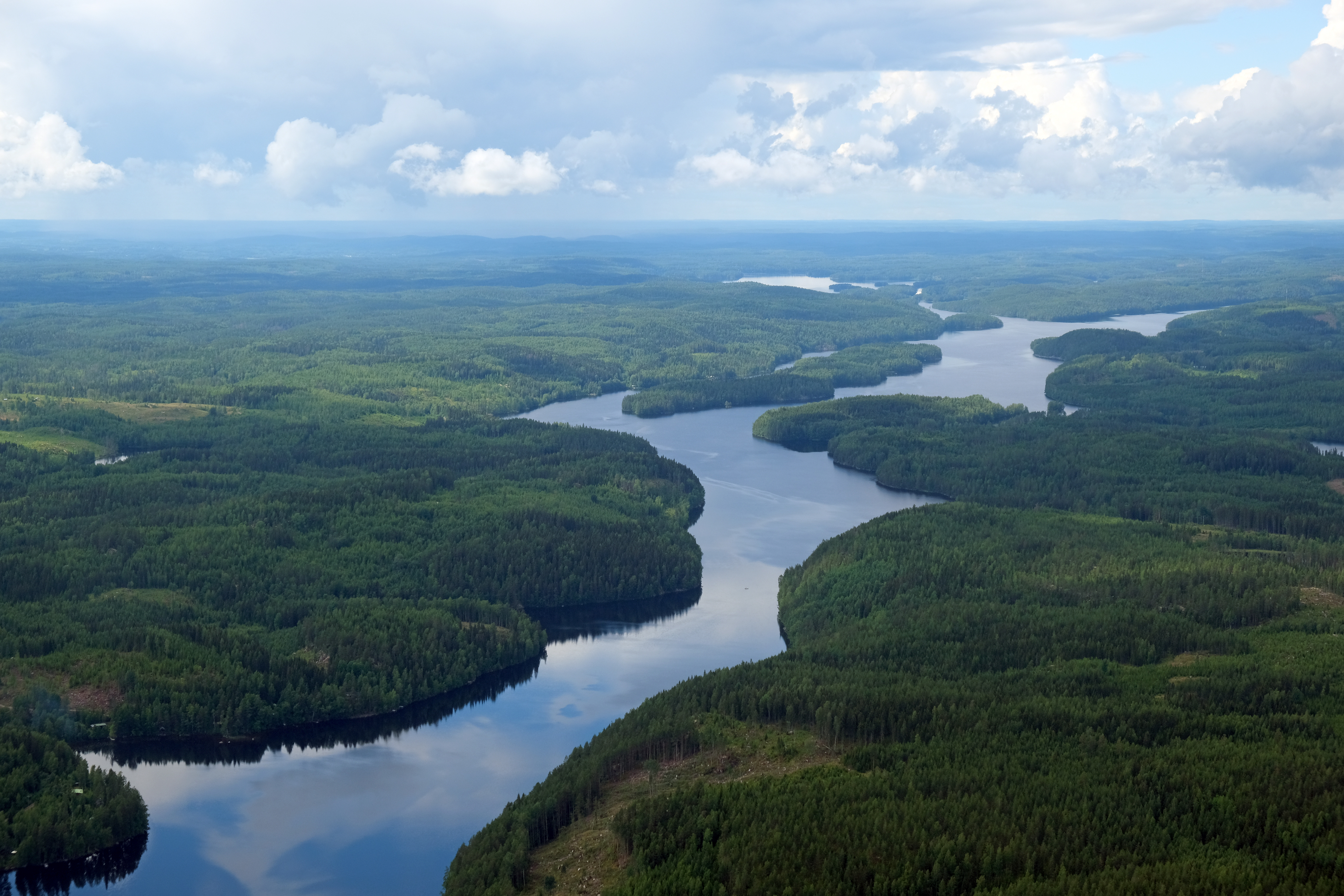
Isojärvi National Park
