= Enni (name) =

Enni was a Japanese Buddhist monk.

Other notable people named Enni include:

- Brandur Enni, Faroese singer
- Enni Id, Finnish painter
- Enni Mustonen, a pen name of Finnish writer Kirsti Manninen
- Enni Mälkönen, Finnish rally driver
- Enni Rekola, Finnish actress
- Enni Rukajärvi, Finnish snowboarder
