= Haukkasalo =

Island in Lake Päijänne, Finland

Coordinates: 61°43′N 25°26′E

Haukkasalo is the third largest island in lake Päijänne, located in the municipality of Kuhmoinen, Finland. It has an area of 12 square kilometers (4.6 sq mi). The island has no road access, but is accessible via cable ferry. As of 2009, Haukkasalo had 12 permanent inhabitants and 80 seasonal homes.

Haukkasalo had its own school from 1919 until 1967, after which it was assigned to the Pihlajakoski school district.
