= Iso-Urtti =

Peninsula in Jyväskylä, Finland

- Western shore of Iso-Urtti seen across the Urtinpohja bay
- Interactive map of Iso-Urtti

Geography
- Location: Päijänne
- Coordinates: 62.182°N 25.767°E
- Highest point: Urtinvuori

Administration
- Finland
- Region: Central Finland
- Municipality: Jyväskylä

Iso-Urtti is a peninsula in the northern part of lake Päijänne in the Keljonkangas district of Jyväskylä, Finland. It is connected to the mainland by a narrow isthmus named Urtinkanta. The peninsula is forested, and only inhabited seasonally.

== Geography ==
=== Location ===
Iso-Urtti is located in the northern part of Päijänne, between the Keljonlahti bay to its west and Poronselkä to its east. The section of Keljonlahti between the peninsula and the mainland is known as Urtinpohja, which terminates at the narrow Urtinkanta isthmus connecting Iso-Urtti to the mainland. The municipal border between Jyväskylä and Muurame passes through the isthmus, but the peninsula itself is entirely within Jyväskylä. It is part of the Keljonkangas district, along with the similarly named island of Vähä-Urtti to the northeast closer to Nenäinniemi. The highest point of the peninsula is the hill Urtinvuori, rising about 50 meters (160 ft) above the surface of Päijänne (78.8 m [259 ft]).

Iso-Urtti is accessible on foot or via boat; the only motor road to the peninsula is private. There are seasonal homes on the peninsula, but no houses inhabited year-round.

Southeastern side of Urtinvuori

=== Nature ===
Iso-Urtti is rocky and forested, with the most common tree being the pine, but spruce forest and mixed forest grow especially in the peninsula's western part. Small numbers of littleleaf lindens are also found in more fertile parts.

There are three locally valuable natural sites on the peninsula. Urtinvuori in the center of the peninsula is dry and rocky, and its southern side features steep cliffs. The hill is covered by old pine forest. A more fertile section of mixed birch-spruce forest is found north of the hill; notable plants growing there include Viburnum opulus and Platanthera bifolia. On the northwestern shore, a 2.2-hectare (5.4-acre) patch of downy birch and alder forest whose shrub layer is dominated by various ferns, is found. On the southeastern shore, there is a shallow, overgrown section providing habitat for waterbirds.

== History ==
A stone structure resembling a type of prehistoric burial cairn known as lapinraunio near the Urtti farmhouse in the southern part of Iso-Urtti was described by Timo Jussila and Timo Sepänmaa in 2012. The archaeologists did not conclusively identify the structure as a burial cairn, as it is not near the shore or on a viewpoint where such cairns are usually found, and no excavations were carried out at that time.

The Urtinkanta isthmus has been part of a winter road from Jämsä to Jyväskylä across the ice of Päijänne, which first appears on a map from 1752. The road was still in use at least in the 1830s.

Seasonal homes were built on the peninsula and the opposite shore of Keljonlahti especially in the 1930s. In 1988, the savings bank of Central Finland (Keski-Suomen Säästöpankki) bought 53 hectares (130 acres) of land on Iso-Urtti and made plans to build a new residential area there; however, the city did not agree to zone the area for this purpose, noting that installing municipal infrastructure on the peninsula would be too costly. Similar plans were made again in 2015 by an investor group who had bought the estate from the bank, but were again rejected by the city.
