= Robert Ruohtula =

Finnish politician

Robert Ruohtula (15 November 1853, in Kuhmoinen – 8 May 1914) was a Finnish farmer and politician. He was a member of the Parliament of Finland from 1911 to 1913, representing the Finnish Party.
