= Tuomastornit observation towers =

Observation towers in Padasjoki, Finland

Tuomastornit
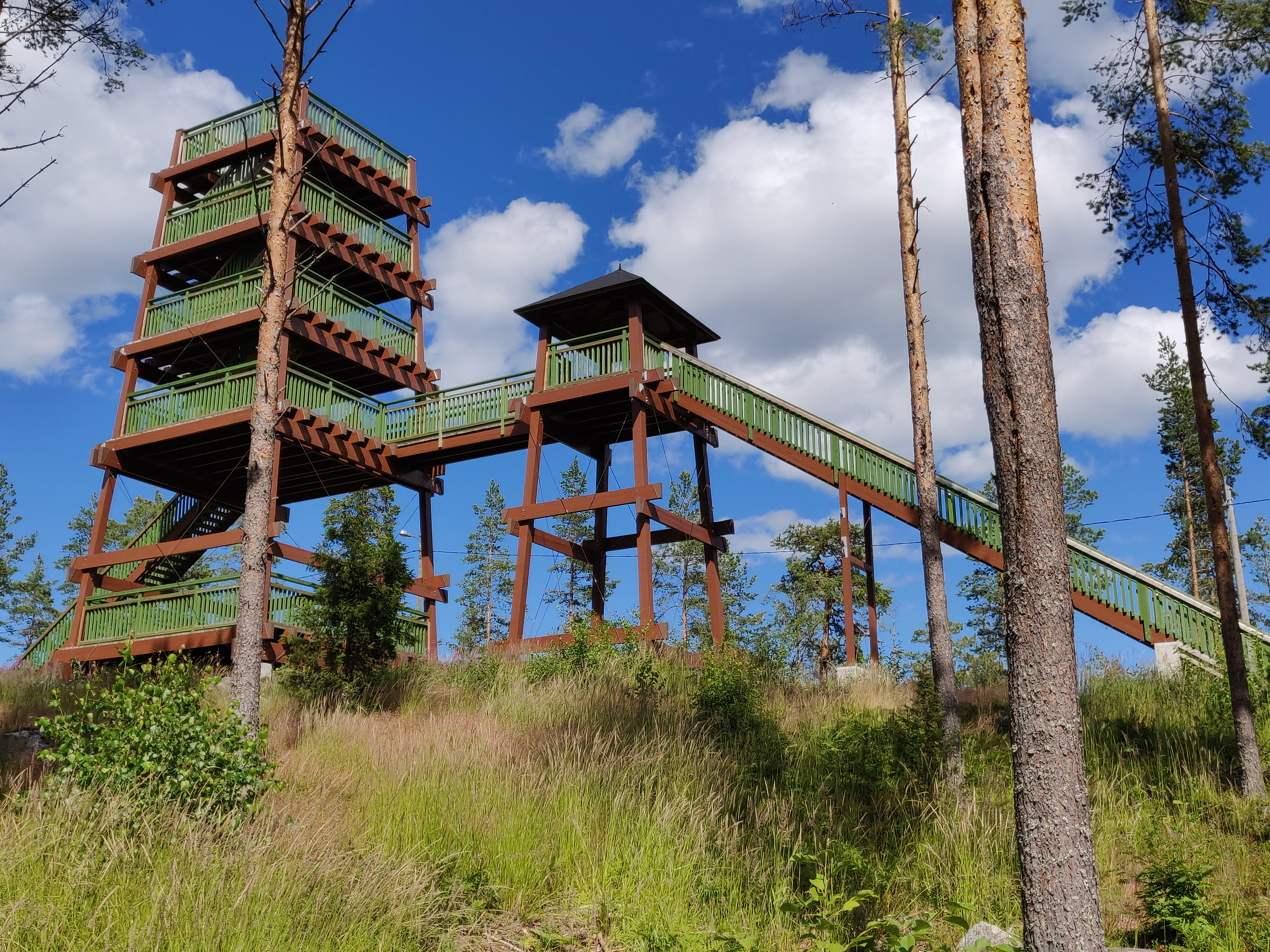
- Tuomastornit photographed in 2020
- Interactive map of the Tuomastornit area

General information
- Status: Completed
- Type: Observation tower
- Location: Padasjoki, Finland
- Coordinates: 61.36337°N 25.28671°E
- Completed: 2013

Tuomastornit is an observation tower located in Padasjoki, Finland. The observation is about 14 meters tall and it was completed in 2013. The tower is built mainly of glued laminated timber which ensures it can endure large number of visitors.

The observation tower has two parts: lower Pikku-Tuomas (little Tuomas) and taller Iso-Tuomas (Big Tuomas). Tuomas is a male given name common in Finland. It is the Finnish version of the name Thomas.

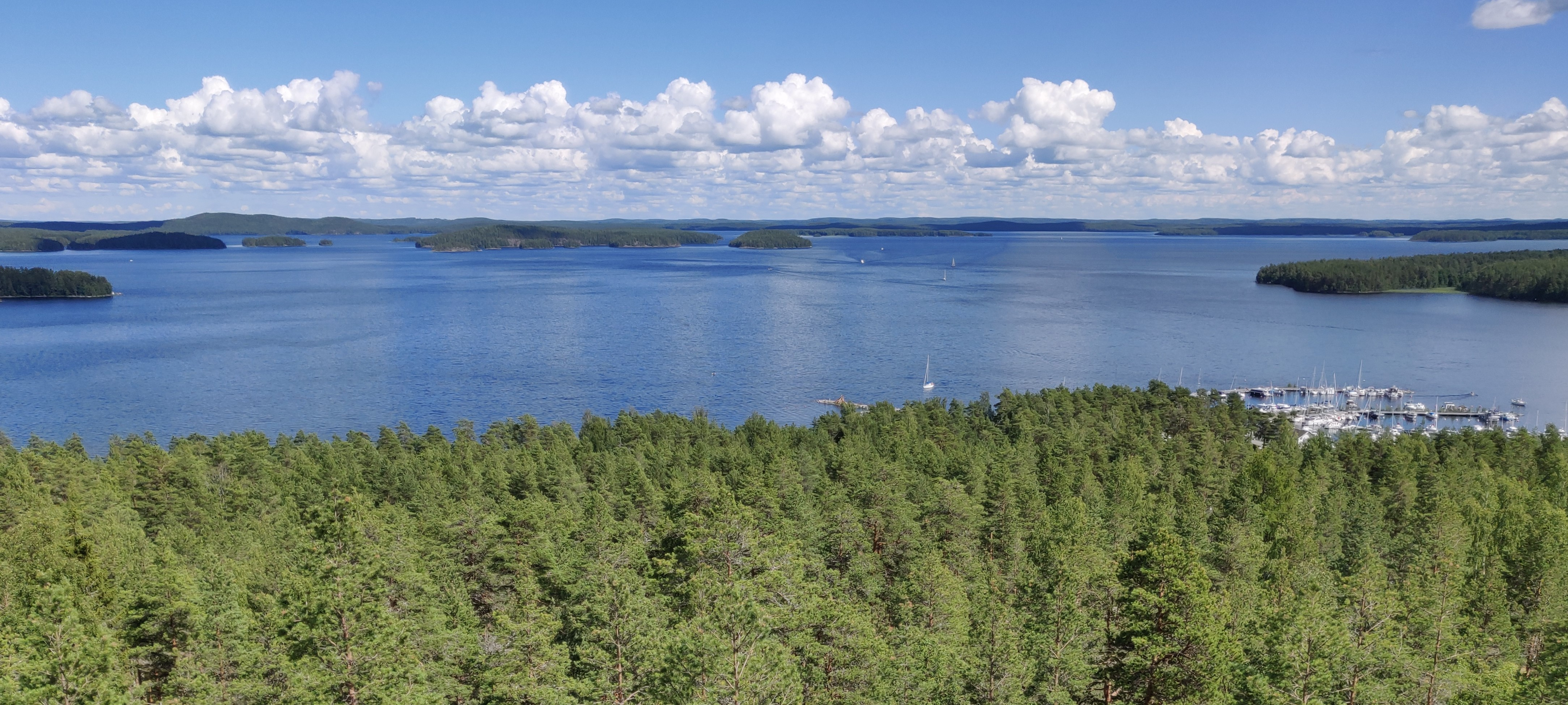
A view which opens from top of Tuomastornit observation tower in Padasjoki, Finland. The lake in the photo is Päijänne.
