= Isojärvi (Kuhmoinen) =

Lake in Kuhmoinen, Finland

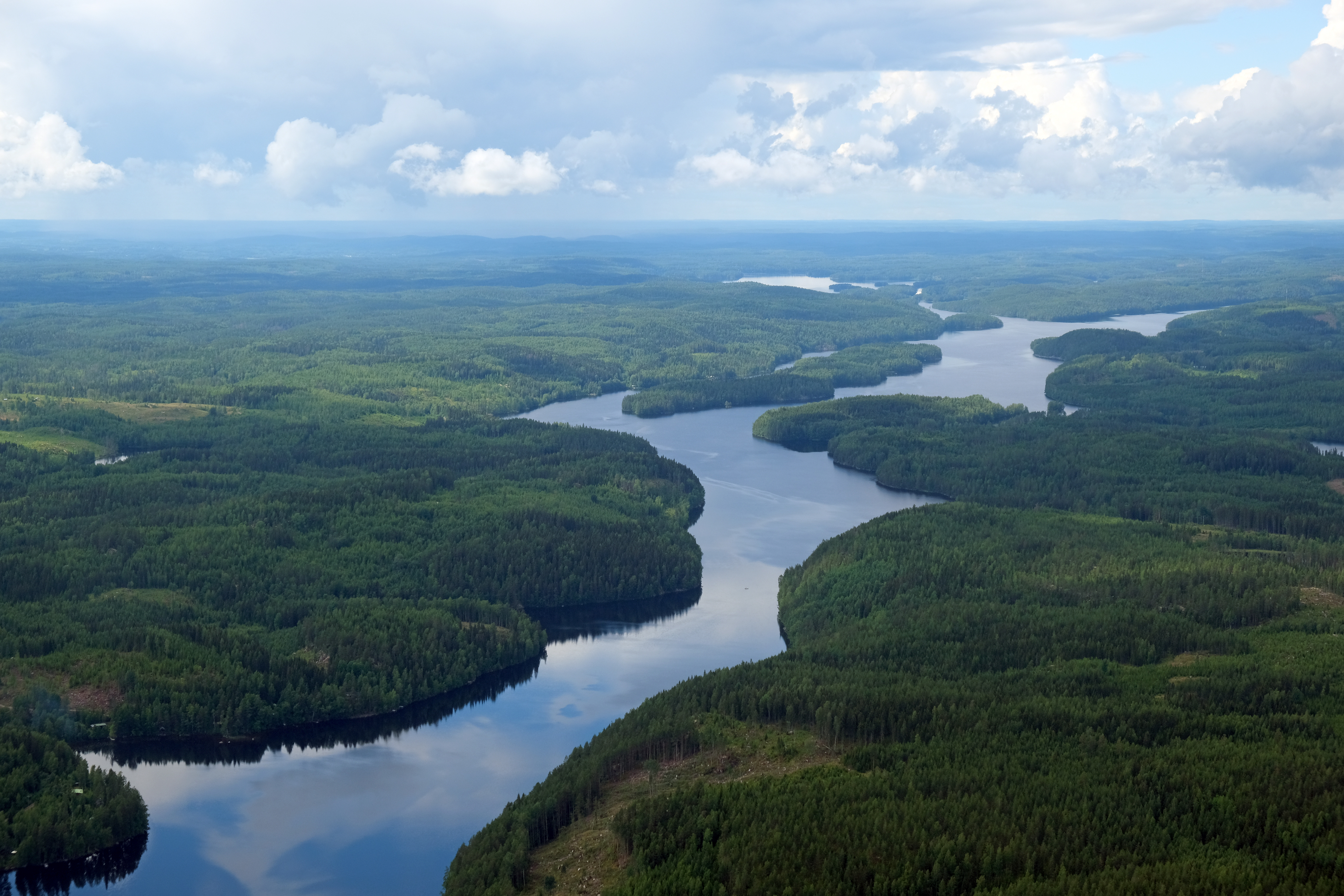

- Location within Finland
- Location: Kuhmoinen, Jämsä
- Coordinates: 61°42′00″N 25°02′30″E
- Basin countries: Finland
- Surface elevation: 118.9 m (390 ft)

Isojärvi is a lake in Finland. It is situated in the municipality of Kuhmoinen and for a lesser part in the municipality of Jämsä in the Central Finland region. The lake is a part of the Kymijoki basin and drains into the lake Päijänne. The Isojärvi National Park is located by the lake.
