= Vuoritsalo =

Island in Jyväskylä, Finland

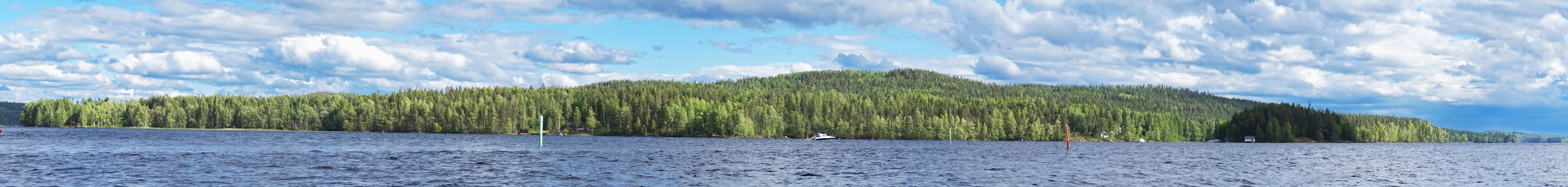
- Vuoritsalo seen from the west.
- Interactive map of Vuoritsalo

Geography
- Coordinates: 62.2°N 25.83°E
- Area: 4.8 km^{2} (1.9 sq mi)

Administration
- Finland
- Lake: Päijänne
- Municipalities: Jyväskylä

Vuoritsalo is a 4.8-square-kilometre (1.9 sq mi) island in the northern part of lake Päijänne in Jyväskylä, Finland. There are many seasonal homes on the island's coasts, while the interior is uninhabited forest. The terrain of the island is rocky and uneven, with forests ranging from barren types to more fertile ones.

== Geography ==
=== Location ===
Vuoritsalo is located in the northernmost part of the Päijänne, north of the Murtoselkä fjard (an open area in a lake). It is surrounded by smaller islands such as Siikasaari, Lehtinen, Kalasaari, Iso-Holsti, Pieni-Holsti, Pieni Vuoritsalo and Pieni-Lehtinen. The closest urban areas are Haapaniemi in the northeast and Hämeenlahti in the northwest. Vuoritsalo is administratively part of the Laajaranta district and the official village of Haapaniemi.

=== Environment ===
The highest point on Vuoritsalo reaches a height of 170.8 metres (560 ft) from sea level. (Note: 92.5 m (303 ft) above the Päijänne, whose surface is located 78.3 m (257 ft) above sea level.) The former shores of the Yoldia Sea, a post-glacial predecessor of the Baltic Sea, at 145 m (476 ft) are visible on the island as wide areas of bare rocky ground. The Yoldia Sea was followed by the Ancylus Lake, whose shores are located 120–130 m (390–430 ft) above modern sea level; while also rocky, these areas are not as bare or prominent.

The most common surface material on the island is rock, while till and silt are found in the northern parts. The most common rock types on the island are tonalite and granodiorite.

Most of Vuoritsalo is forested. Due to differences in elevation across the island, the vegetation is fairly diverse, ranging from pine-dominated, lichen-covered barren types to fertile littleleaf linden groves with various uncommon plants, such as Actaea spicata and Lathyrus vernus. There are also small wetlands that have formed into depressions in the ground. Spruces have been planted on the island and are occasionally felled in order to preserve the linden groves.

== History ==
The northernmost tip of the island, Muuttokanta, (Note: muuttaa "to change" + kanta "heel") is so named because rowboats (kirkkovene) from Oravasaari and Toivakka coming to the church of Jyväskylä switched their rowers there. After steamships were introduced, Muuttokanta acted as a stop for ships traveling between the town of Jyväskylä and Vaajakoski.

Vuoritsalo was connected to the municipal electrical network in 2023.

== Recreational values ==
There is a series of hiking paths around Vuoritsalo, made by the Forest Centre of Central Finland (Keski-Suomen metsäkeskus) to be used as an educational route for forest owners as well as for maintenance. The island is also accessible during winter via a ski track network over the Päijänne.

Vesiurheiluklubi, a water skiing and motorboating club established in 1961 had their base in Vuoritsalo since 1969, which was soon accompanied by a cabin. As the club became more focused on water skiing and relocated to the lake Muuratjärvi, a separate motorboating club, Jyväskylän Veneurheilijat, split off from it in 1971, holding the base until 1981.
