= Pohjois-Karjala (song) =

Single by Leevi and the Leavings

from the album Perjantai 14. päivä
- A-side: "Kerro terveiset lapsille"
- Released: 1986
- Genre: Rock, pop
- Length: 4:58
- Producer: Johanna Kustannus

Leevi and the Leavings singles chronology
"Poika nimeltä Päivi" (1985)	"Pohjois-Karjala" (1986)	"Rin Tin Tin" (1988)

Music video
- "Pohjois-Karjala" on YouTube

"Pohjois-Karjala" (North Karelia) is a popular song released in 1986 by the Finnish rock band Leevi and the Leavings. It is part of the album Perjantai 14. päivä ("Friday the 14th") produced by Johanna Kustannus, and is generally considered the most popular song on the album.

The song is about a city man who longs to return to his birthplace in North Karelia. Like other songs, the song was composed, written and arranged by Gösta Sundqvist, and because of this, Sundqvist was often mistakenly thought to be from North Karelia, although in reality Sundqvist spent his whole life in Espoo and Helsinki. Since Markku Mattila, who had been the drummer since 1982, had left the band, bassist Risto Paananen had to play drums on the song as well.

According to journalist Janne Toivonen from Helsingin Sanomat, the main character of the song, "a gentle-hearted loser who has lost the melody of life", is an example of the "characters that fall into the melancholic Finnish consciousness" that Gösta Sundqvist creates in his songs. In 2014, readers of Helsingin Sanomat voted the song the best "car song". North Karelians consider the song a kind of "unofficial regional anthem".

== Composition of the band ==
Its original version is played by:

- Gösta Sundqvist (vocals/guitar)
- Juha Karastie (guitar)
- Risto Paananen (bass/guitar/drums)

== See also ==
- Rock music in Finland

== Sources ==
=== Further reading ===
- Ketvel, Roo (1989). Sanoista (in Finnish). Helsinki: Zappa Oy. ISBN 951-8966-00-1.
- Luoto, Santtu (2004). Raparperitaivas (in Finnish). Helsinki: Johnny Kniga. ISBN 951-0-29667-8.
