= Joel Naaralainen =

Finnish politician

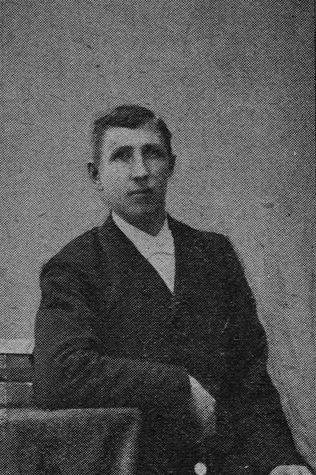
Image of J. F. Naaralainen

Joel Fridolf Naaralainen (13 December 1867 - 30 December 1915) was a Finnish farmer and politician. He was a member of the Parliament of Finland from 1907 to 1908, representing the Social Democratic Party of Finland (SDP). He was born in Kuhmoinen.
