= Päijänne =

Lake in central Finland

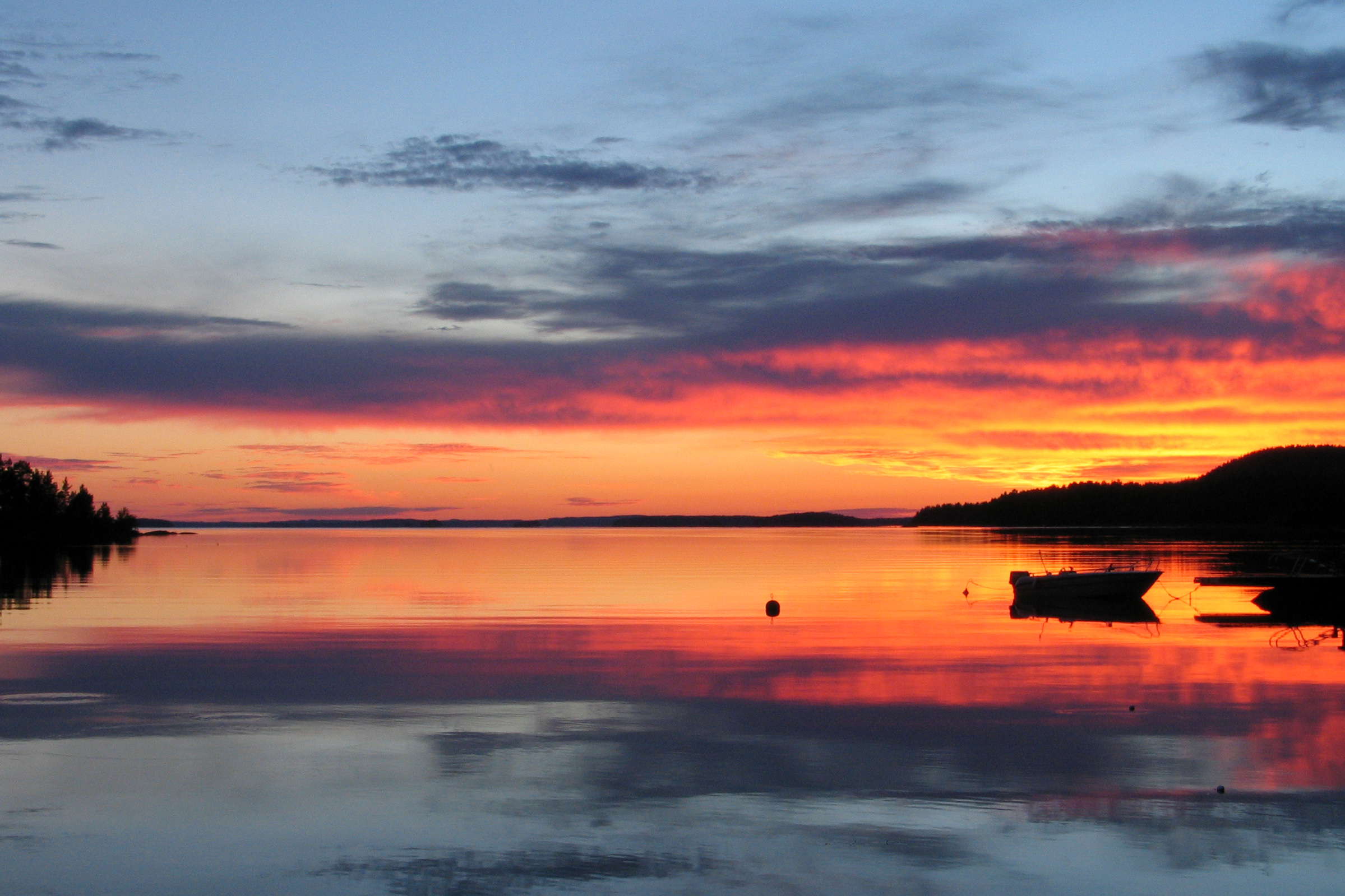
- Päijänne and Päijätsalo

- Location within Finland

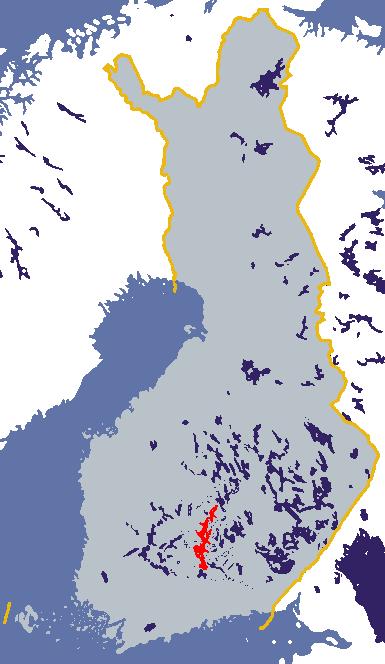
- Coordinates: 61°35′N 025°30′E
- Primary outflows: Kymi River
- Basin countries: Finland
- Max. length: 120 km (75 mi)
- Surface area: 1,070–1,082.89 km^{2} (413.13–418.11 sq mi)
- Average depth: 16.2–18 m (53–59 ft)
- Max. depth: 95.3 m (313 ft)
- Water volume: 18.1 km^{3} (4.3 cu mi)
- Residence time: 2.5 years
- Surface elevation: 78.3 m (257 ft)
- Islands: 1886 (Virmailansaari, Salonsaari, Judinsalo, Onkisalo, Paatsalo, Muuratsalo, Haukkasalo, Vuoritsalo, Mustassalo, Edessalo, Taivassalo)
- Settlements: Asikkala, Jyväskylä, Korpilahti, Kuhmoinen, Luhanka, Muurame, Padasjoki, Sysmä

Päijänne (Finnish pronunciation: [ˈpæi̯jænːe]) is the second largest lake in Finland (1,080 km^{2} (266,874 acres)). The lake drains into the Gulf of Finland via the Kymi River. The major islands are from north to south Vuoritsalo, Muuratsalo, Onkisalo, Judinsalo, Edessalo, Taivassalo, Haukkasalo, Vehkasalo, Mustassalo, Virmailansaari and Salonsaari. The largest island is Virmailansaari. The word saari means an island. Salo once meant a great island, nowadays it means a great forest area.

The largest city on the shores of Päijänne is Jyväskylä in the North. The city of Lahti is connected to Päijänne through Lake Vesijärvi and Vääksy canal.

An underground aqueduct, Päijänne Water Tunnel, connects the lake to Vantaa, providing the Greater Helsinki area with water. The deepest point in any lake in Finland is in Päijänne (95.3 m or 313 ft).

The name of Lake Päijänne comes possibly from a Pre-Finno-Ugric substrate language.

== Transportation ==
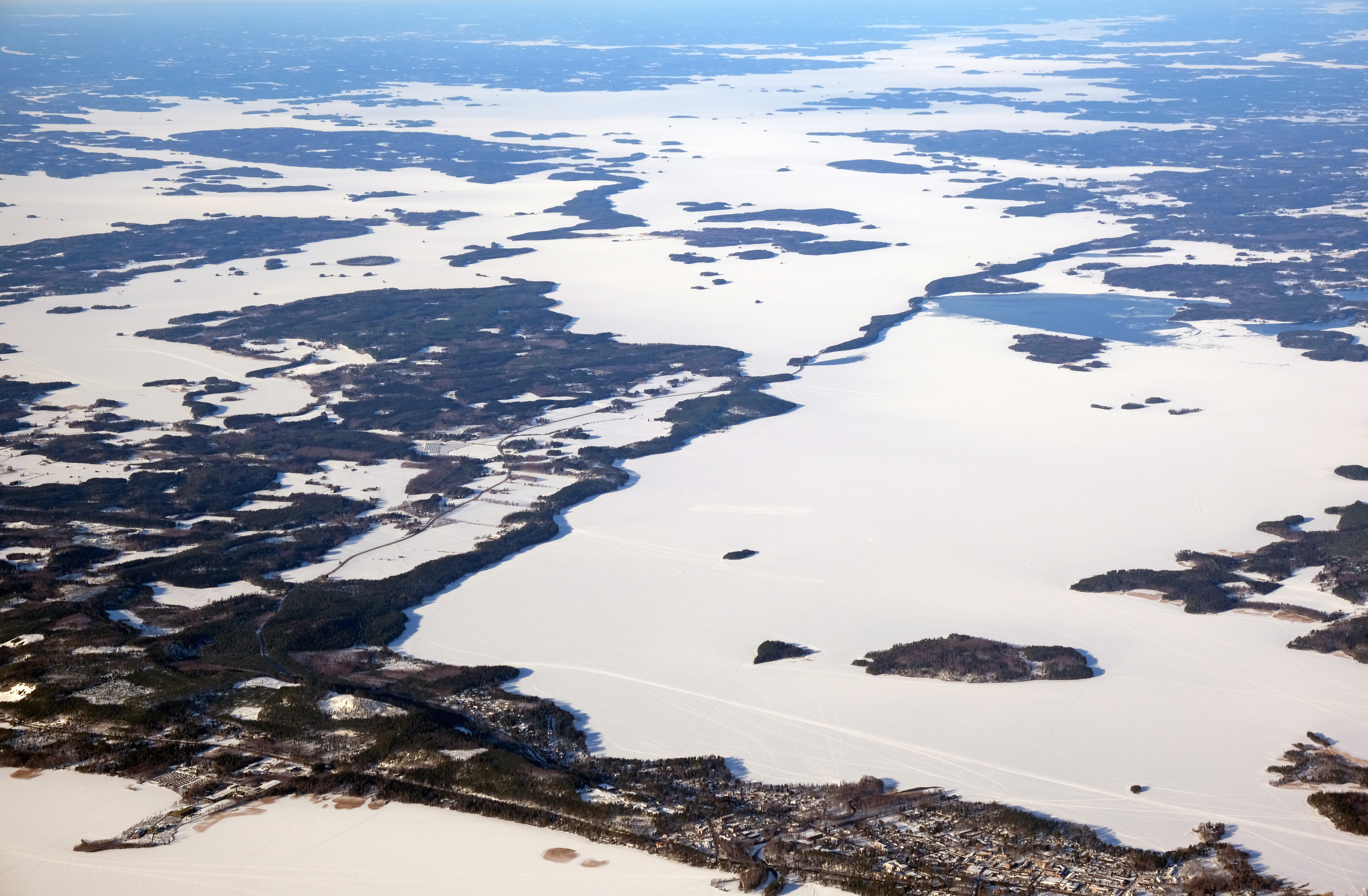
Aerial view of frozen Lake Päijänne

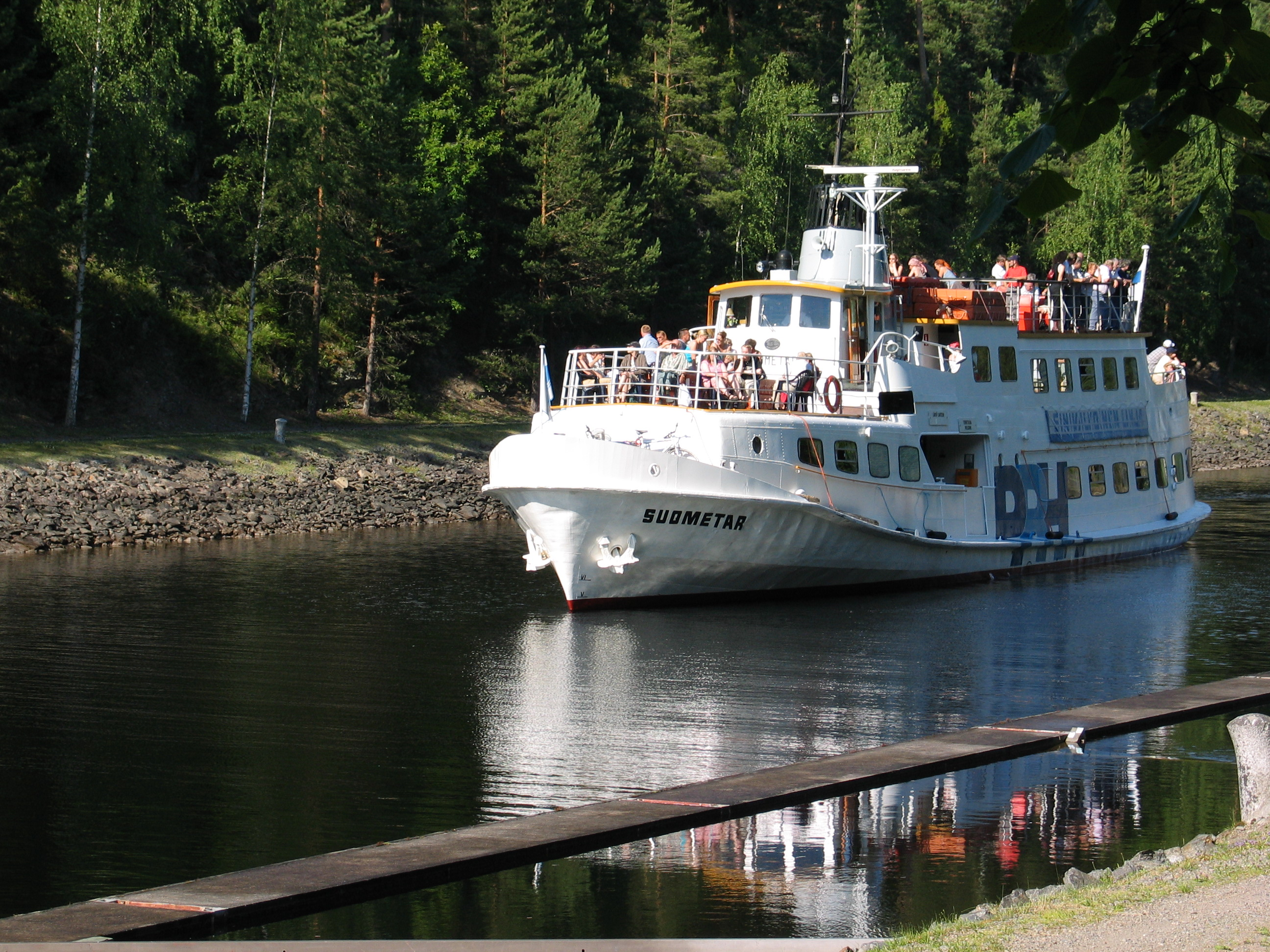
MS Suometar in the Kalkkinen canal between Päijänne and Kalkkinen

Päijänne is a famous boating, canoeing and sailing attraction. The 119 kilometres (74 mi) long lake is connected by canals to Lake Keitele, Lake Vesijärvi and Lake Ruotsalainen. Length of the open waterway for ships is 380 kilometres (240 mi). Construction of canals connecting Päijänne to the Baltic Sea has been discussed for decades. Nevertheless, the plan is still to be materialized.

Until the 1940s Lake Päijänne was a major transportation channel in the Central Finland. Numerous ships transported passengers and freight between the villages and cities on the shores of Päijänne. Nowadays, passenger transportation is rather a tourist attraction on the lakelands than the fastest way connecting the cities and villages. One of the most popular passenger transportation routes in summertime is between the cities of Lahti and Jyväskylä.

Present day passenger ships on Päijänne
Name	Built	Passengers	Length	Width	Speed	Home harbour
M/S Aino	1922	90	17,20 m	4,10 m	11 knots	Lahti
M/S Elbatar	1984	90	16,08 m	4,78 m	11 knots	Padasjoki
M/S Charlotte						Padasjoki
M/S Happy Days						Lahti
M/S Hilja	1902	60				Jyväskylä, charter ferry
M/S Jenni-Maria II	1970	30	15,30 m	3,80 m	15 knots	Sysmä
M/S Katrilli		80				Jyväskylä, charter ferry
M/S Kymppi		77				Jyväskylä, charter ferry
S/S Laitiala	1903	130	26,7 m	6,64 m		Lahti, charter ferry
M/S Meininki	1970	30				Jyväskylä, charter ferry
M/S Minni						Jyväskylä
M/S Päijänne		50	20 m	5 m		Jyväskylä, charter ferry
M/S Rhea			43 m	8,2 m		Jyväskylä
M/S Rosetta						Lahti, charter ferry
M/S Ruotsalainen			22,10 m	5,32 m		Asikkala
M/S Salome			18,90 m	4,35 m		Lahti, charter ferry
M/S Suometar		199				Jyväskylä
M/S Suomen Neito		199				Jyväskylä
M/S Suomen Suvi	1993	199				Jyväskylä
S/S Suomi	1906	199	31,60 m	2,13 m		Jyväskylä
M/S Terhi		199				Heinola
M/S Tuulikki II		170				Jämsä
M/S Tuulikki III		80				Jämsä
M/S Wellamo	1990	190				Lahti

== Tourism ==
There are 16,000 cottages on the shores of Päijänne. Most of the cottages are private owned and have a separate sauna cottage.

In addition to cottage tourism Päijänne attracts fishing, sailing, canoeing, rowing, paddling, trekking, ice-skating, snow mobile and nature tourists. The National Parks of Päijänne and Leivonmäki alone has tens of thousands of visitors every year.

The Clear and Drinkable Lake Päijänne South Association won a Tourism and Environment award presented by the European Union Commission in 1995.

== National Parks ==
Päijänne National Park (Finnish: Päijänteen kansallispuisto) is a national park in the southern parts of Lake Päijänne. It consists of 50 unbuilt islands and parts of inhabited islands. The national park has been established in 1993 and has an area of 14 square kilometres (5.4 sq mi).

Leivonmäki National Park is situated few kilometres North East from the Northern part of Lake Päijänne. It is one of the youngest national parks in Finland.

== Cities and towns upon Lake Päijänne ==
From North to South

- Jyväskylä (at 62°14.5′N 025°44.5′E)
- Säynätsalo (at 62°08.3′N 025°46.9′E)
- Muurame (at 62°08′N 025°40.5′E)
- Toivakka (at 62°06′N 026°05′E)
- Korpilahti (at 62°01′00″N 025°33′40″E)
- Jämsä (at 61°52′N 025°11′E)
- Luhanka (at 61°48′N 025°42′E)
- Joutsa (at 61°44.5′N 026°07′E)
- Kuhmoinen (at 61°34′N 025°11′E)
- Sysmä (at 61°30′N 025°41′E)
- Padasjoki (at 61°21′N 025°16.5′E)
- Asikkala (at 61°10′20″N 025°32′50″E)

== Gallery ==
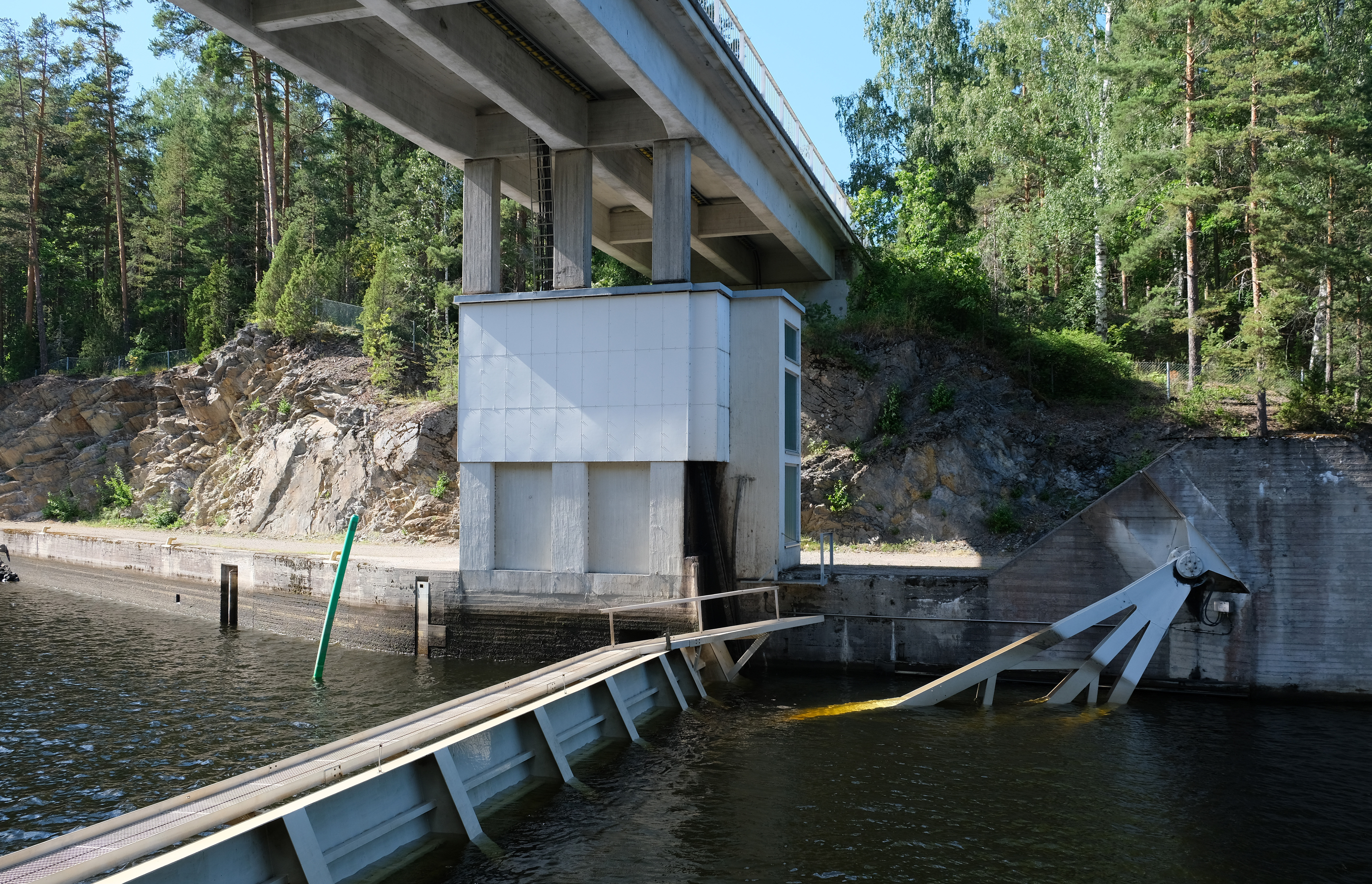
Kalkkinen canal

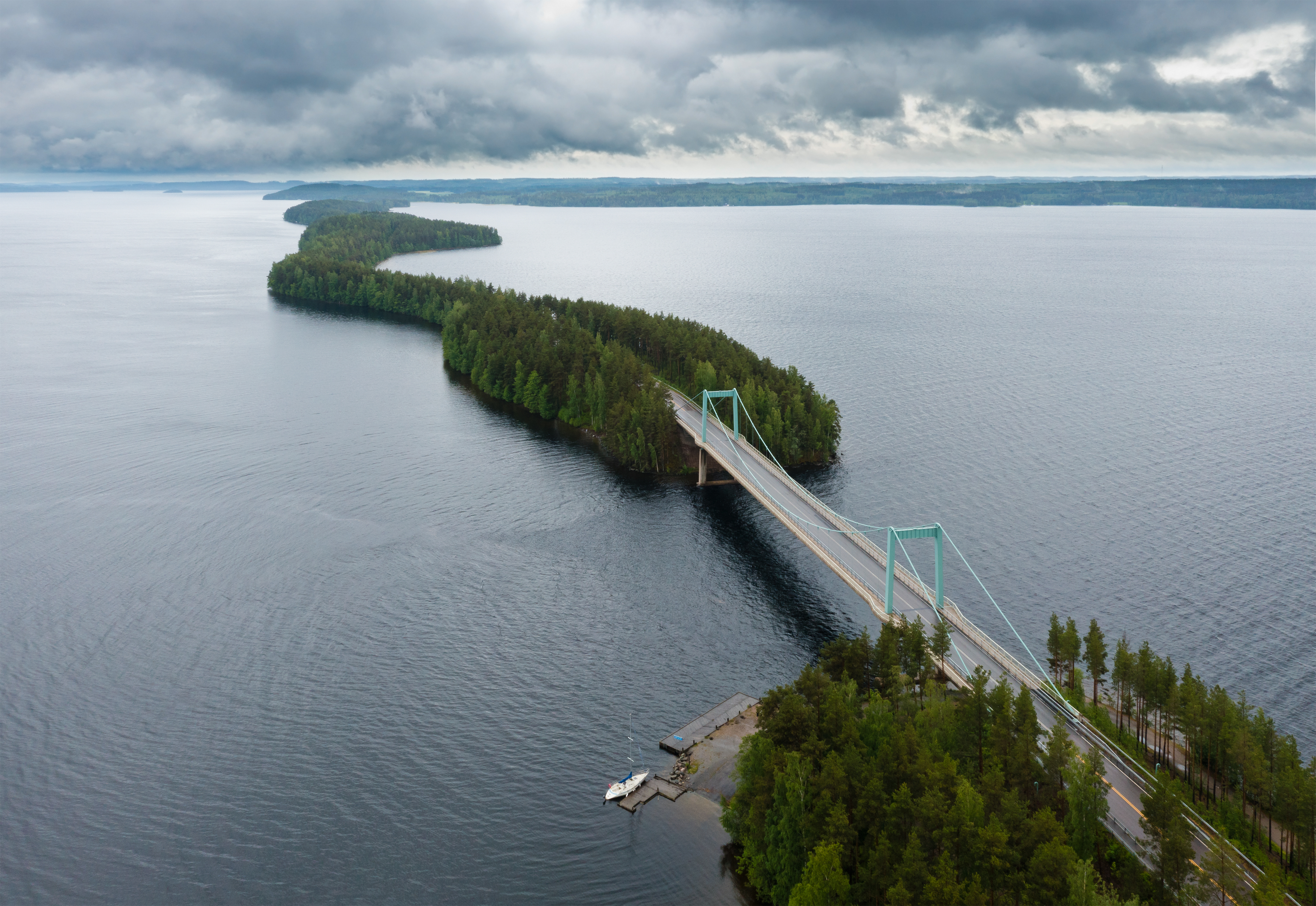
Pulkkilanharju and Karisalmi Bridge in Asikkala

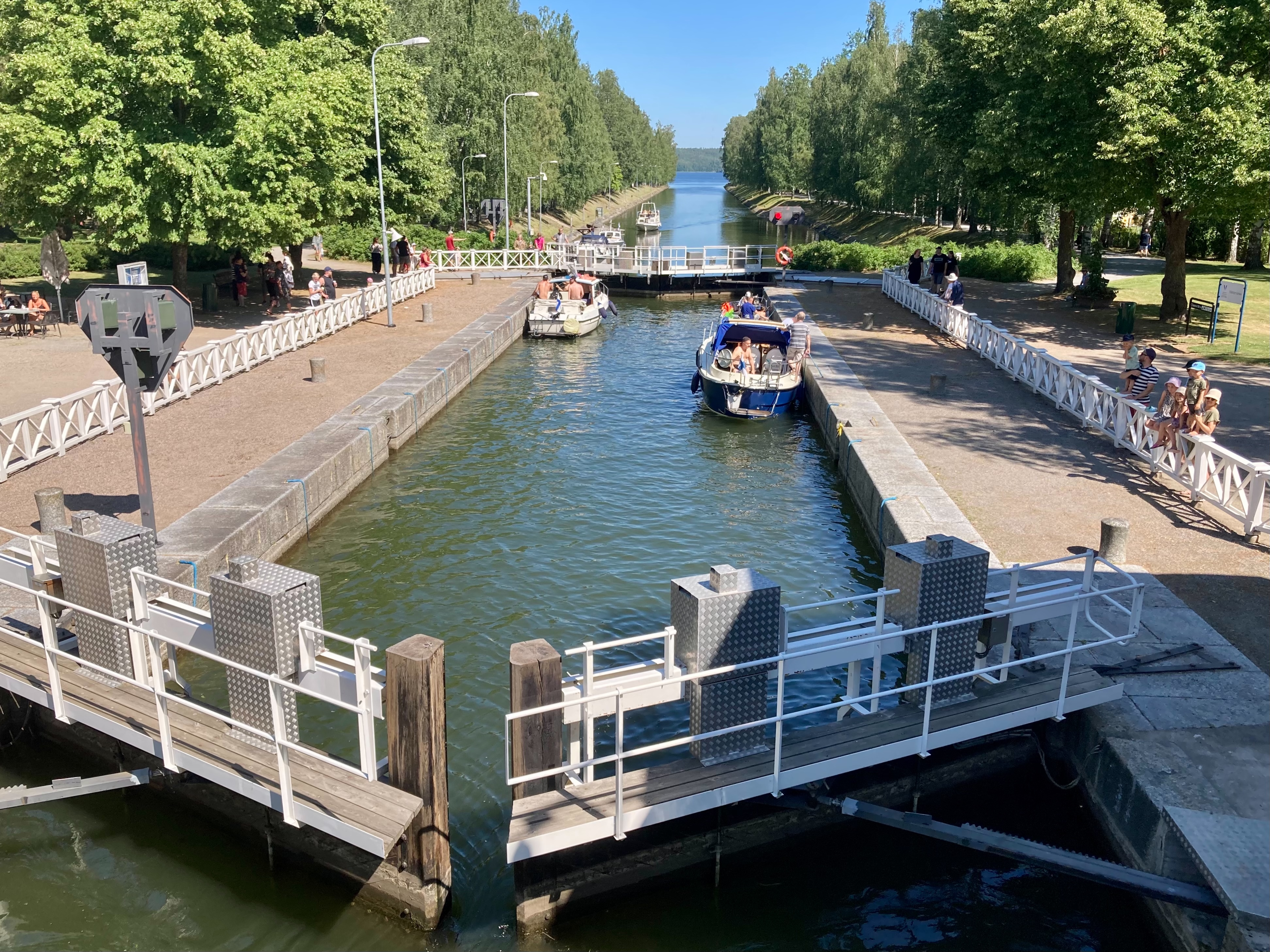
Vääksy canal between Päijänne and Lake Vesijärvi

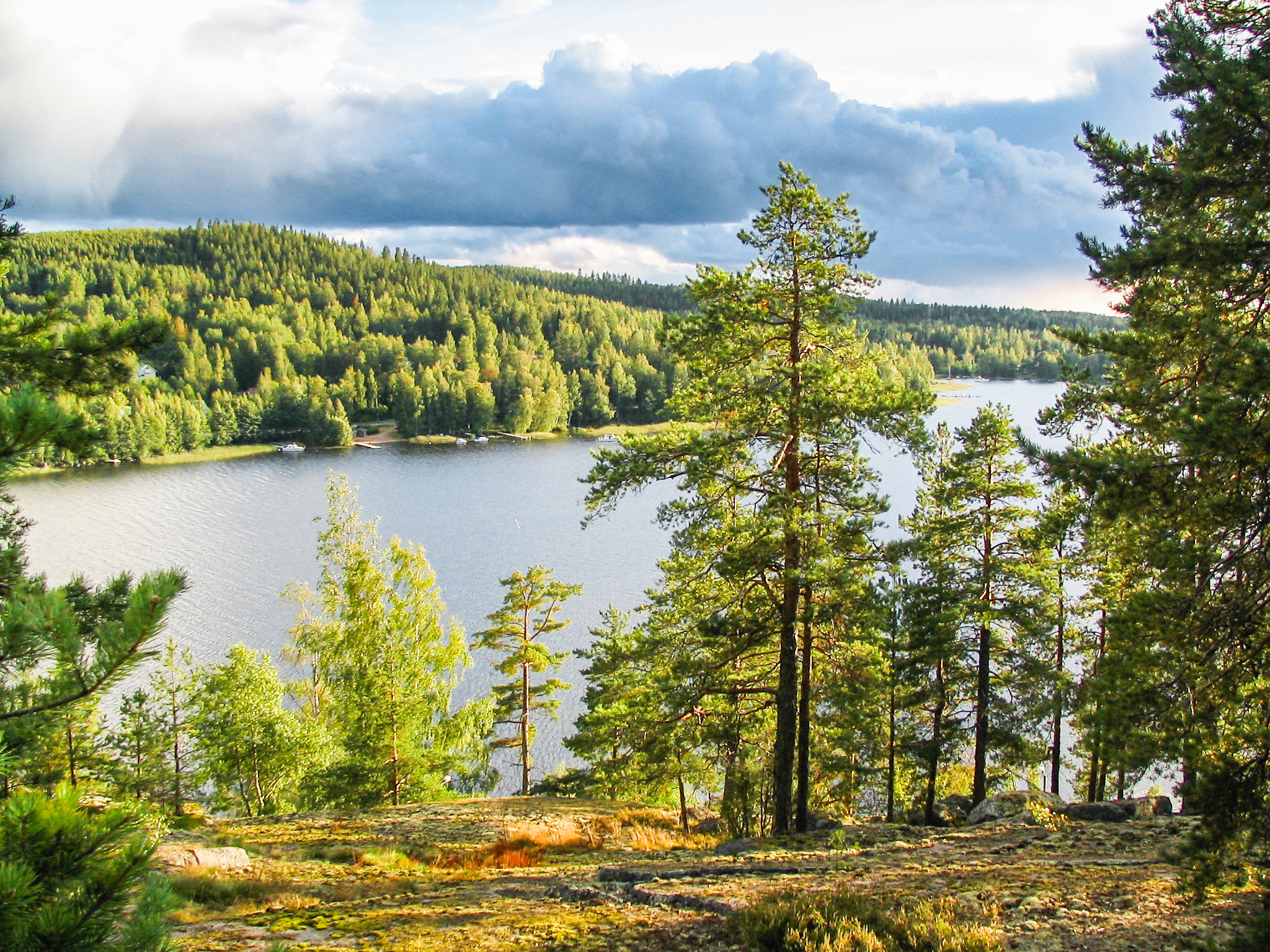
View from Hill Satasarvinen in Muuratsalo, Jyväskylä

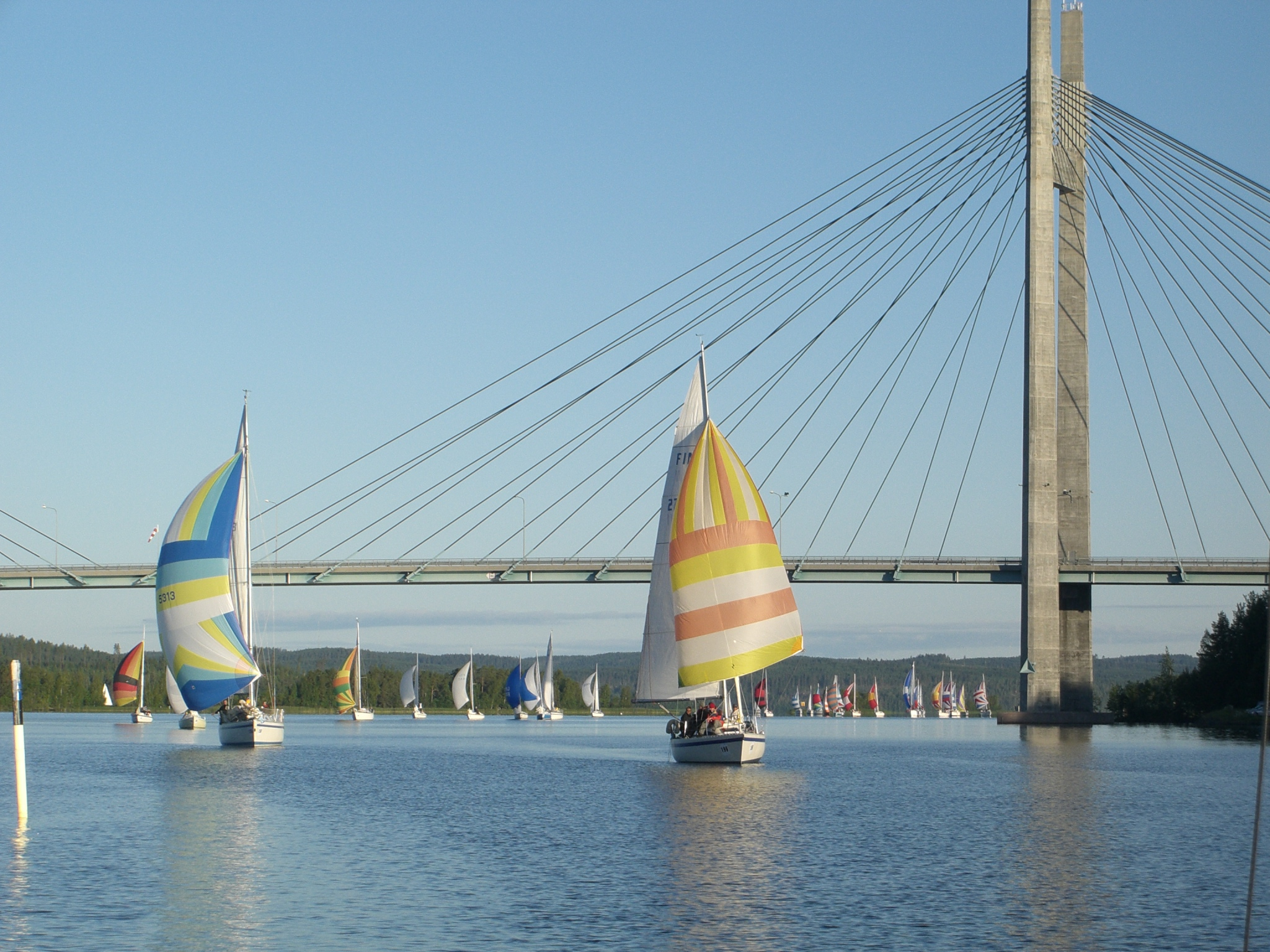
Kärkinen bridge in Korpilahti, Jyväskylä during the Päijännepurjehdus sailing competition

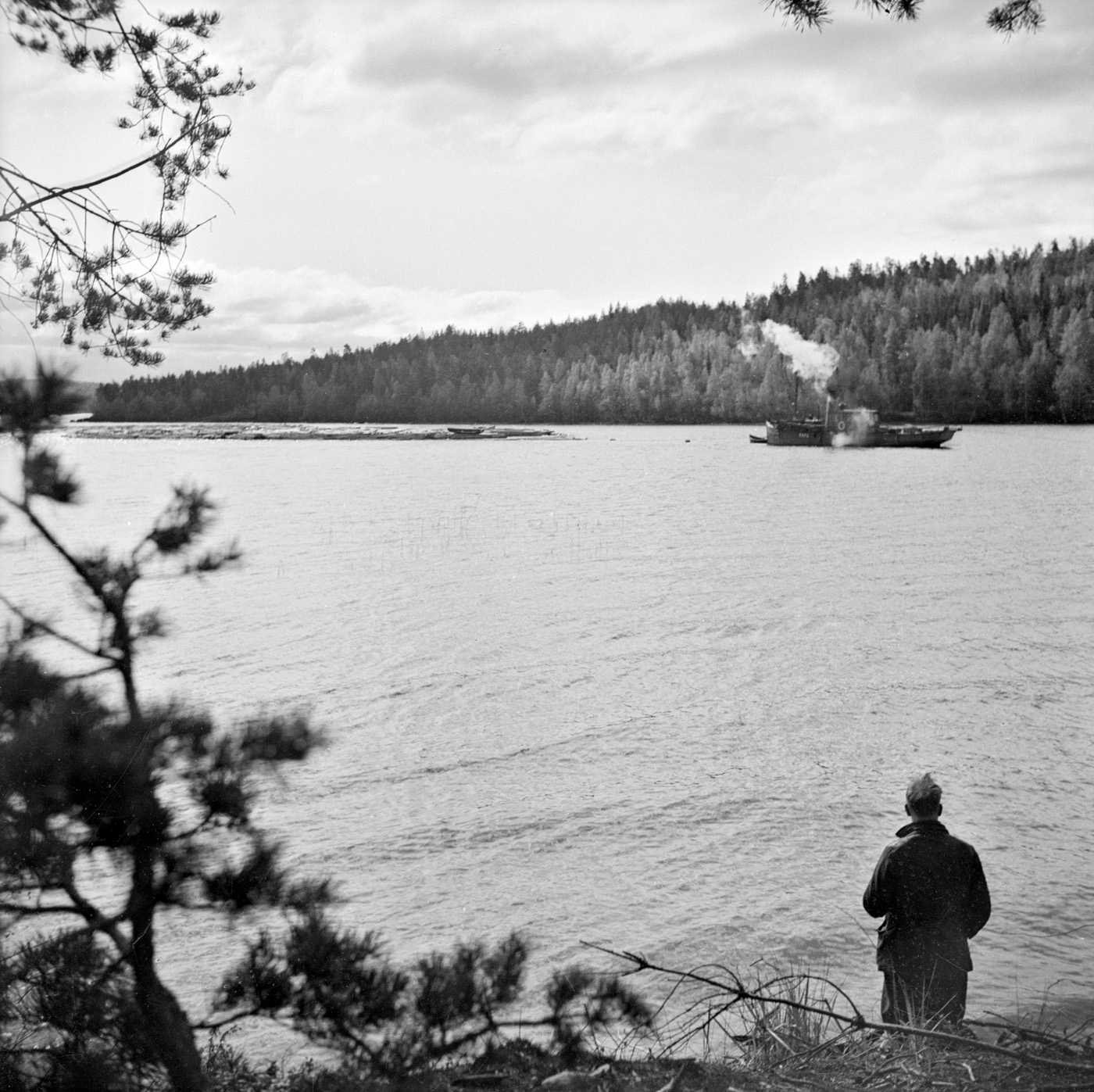
Tugboat pulling logs in Päijänne in 1930s

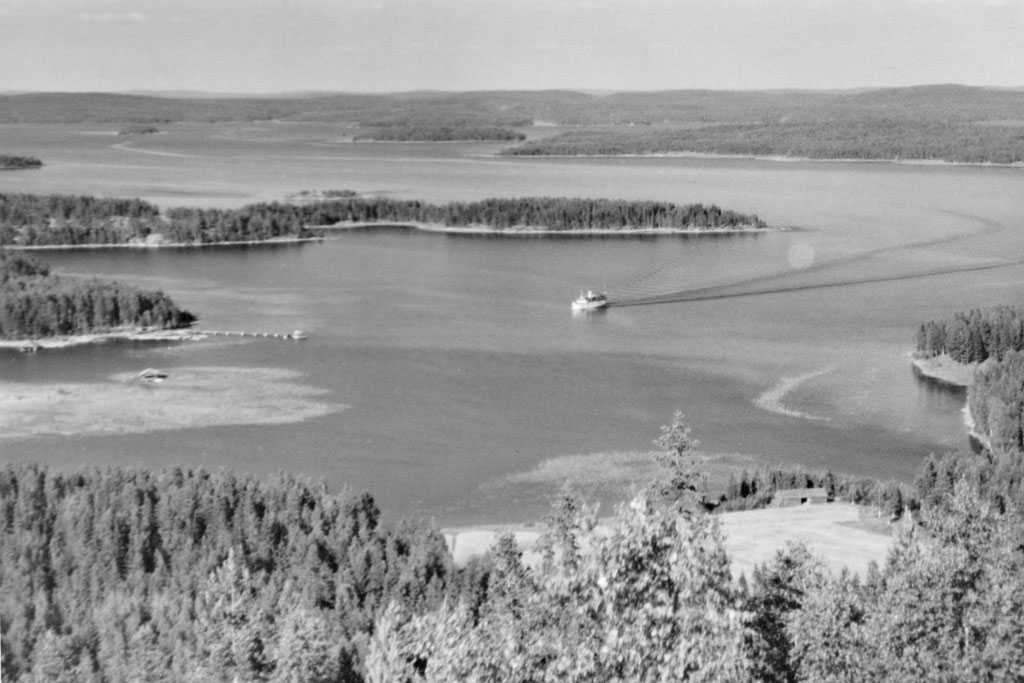
Päijänne from the Puolakanvuori hill in 1948

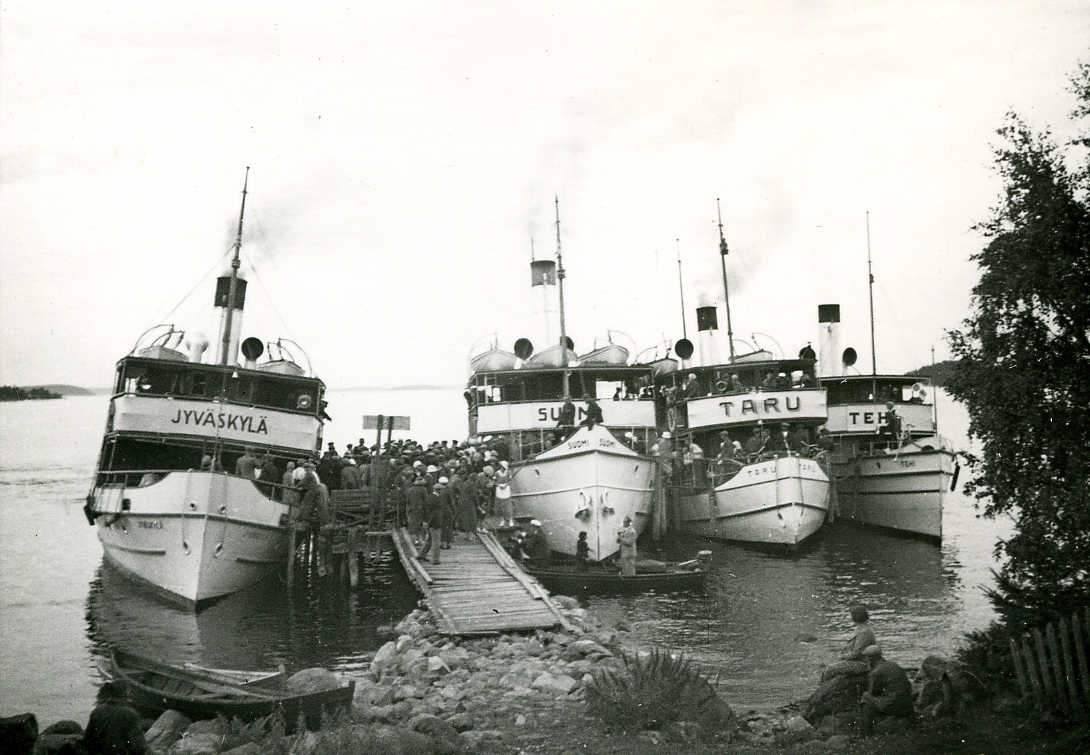
Passenger steam ships S/S Jyväskylä, S/S Suomi, S/S Taru and S/S Tehi in Pihlajakoski harbour, Kuhmoinen in 1938

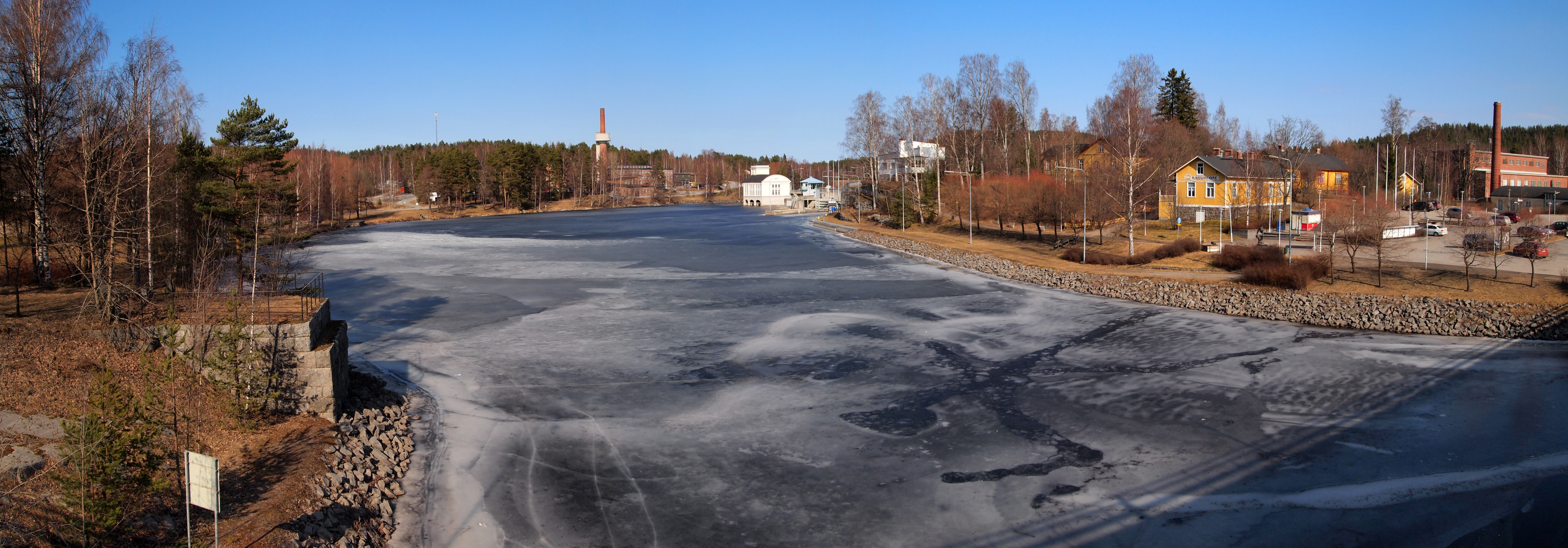
Vaajakoski canal in the Northern end of Lake Päijänne

== See also ==
- Päijänne National Park
