= Päijänne National Park =

National park in Finland

- IUCN category II (national park)
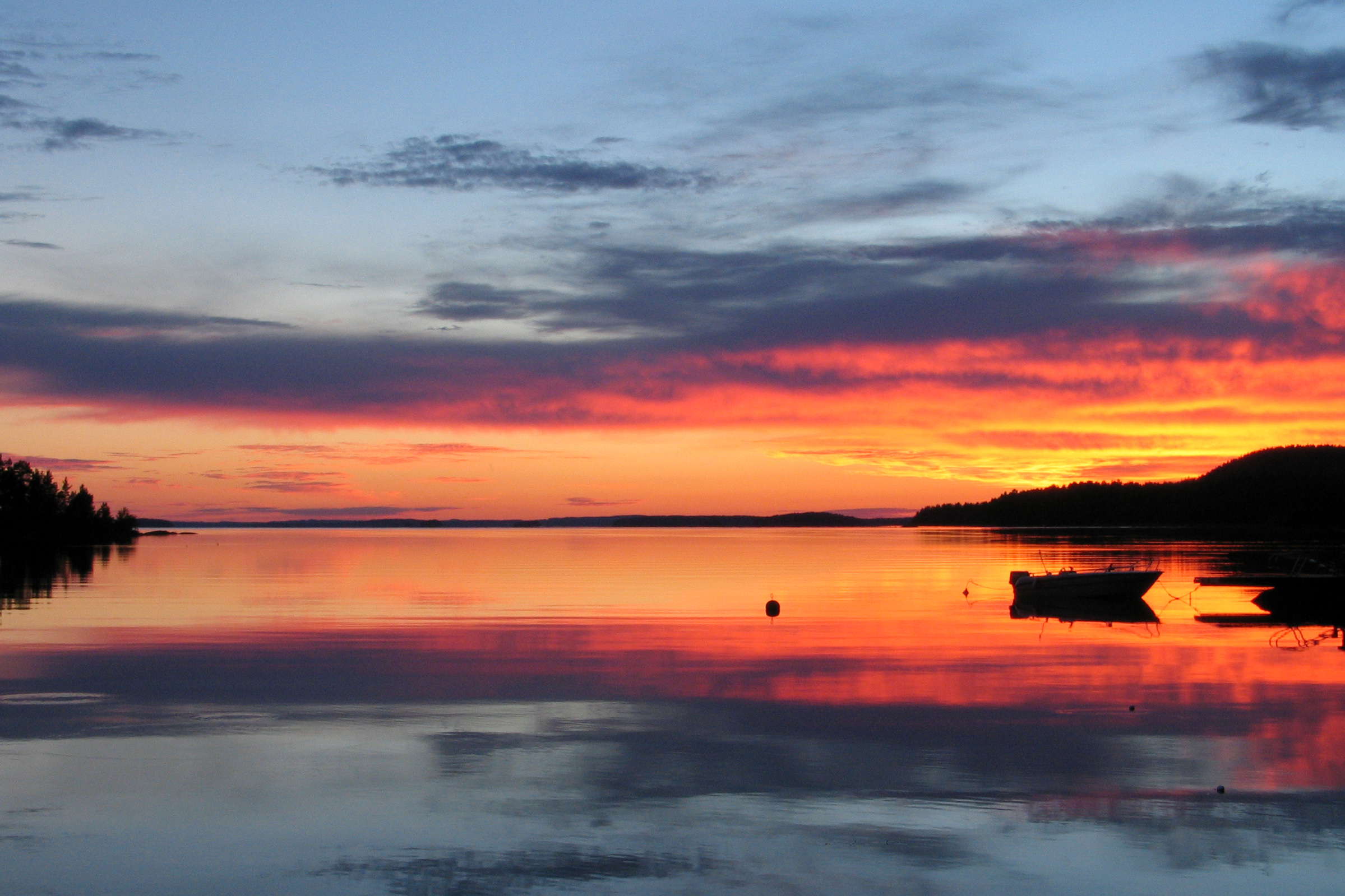
- Päijätsalo island on the right belongs to the national park

- Location within Finland
- Location: Päijät-Häme, Finland
- Coordinates: 61°23′12″N 25°23′36″E
- Area: 14 km^{2} (5.4 sq mi)
- Established: 1993
- Visitors: 67,000 (in 2024)
- Governing body: Metsähallitus
- Website: https://www.luontoon.fi/en/destinations/paijanne-national-park

Päijänne National Park (Finnish: Päijänteen kansallispuisto) is a national park in Finland, in the southern parts of Lake Päijänne. It consists of 50 unbuilt islands and parts of inhabited islands. The national park was established in 1993 and has an area of 14 square kilometres (5.4 sq mi).

== See also ==
- List of national parks of Finland
- Protected areas of Finland
