= Enni Id =

Finnish artist

Enni Id (30 January 1904 – 4 April 1992) was a Finnish self-taught painter. Her art is defined as naïve art.

Id only began painting at an older age after the death of her husband Edvard Id in 1966. Enni Id painted with oil paints, mostly on the hardboard base. In her paintings, she depicted traditional rural life, cat themes, and floral arrangements. She also painted the interior walls and furniture of her home cottage in Seitniemi, Padasjoki. These painting feature cats peeking out in the middle of floral patterns and leaf ornaments.

Her cabin is preserved and maintained by Kellosalmi-Seitniemi-Virmaila village association. The cabin is open for visitors during summertime.

== Art exhibitions ==
Id's works were first exhibited at the 1973 Helsinki Art Hall's exhibition of naive art. Thanks to the exhibition, she became more widely known and gained visibility. Later she participated in group and solo exhibitions in Finland, and also the Nordic Naive Exhibition in Aalborg, Denmark, in 1974. She was selected this exhibition with 11 other Finnish artists.

Id organized solo exhibitions at the Brahe Gallery in Turku (1973) and at the Helsinki Art Point (1975).

Her works have been featured in several ITE art exhibitions. Oulu Museum of Art and Kiasma have her paintings in their museum collections.

== Biography ==
Enni Id was born in 1904 in Padasjoki. Her parents, who were tenants of a manor, were not married. Id had several siblings and her parents exercised severe discipline when raising children. As a child, Enni Id worked as a shepherd. Painting was not allowed at the time.

At the age of twenty she fled from her home to the capital Helsinki, where she studied and worked in her aunt's sewing shop.

Id first married to mechanic Kaarlo Hiekkarinne in 1929. The couple lived in Kallio, Helsinki, but Hiekkarinne died a few years later. After this, Enni Id moved back to Padasjoki in 1936.

She remarried in 1939, to mason Edvard Id. Enni Id had no children from either of these marriages.

Id only started to paint full-time after the second husband Edvard passed away. She was over 60 years at that point. The husband had not tolerated painting. Enni Id originally received her painting equipment as a gift from a family of teachers who spent summers in Padasjoki.

Enni Id lived her last years in the municipal nursing home. Even there she continued to paint. Id died of pneumonia on April 4, 1992, in Padasjoki.

Id was a colorful and eye-catching personality, almost a local celebrity. Some people resented her and considered her lewd personality.

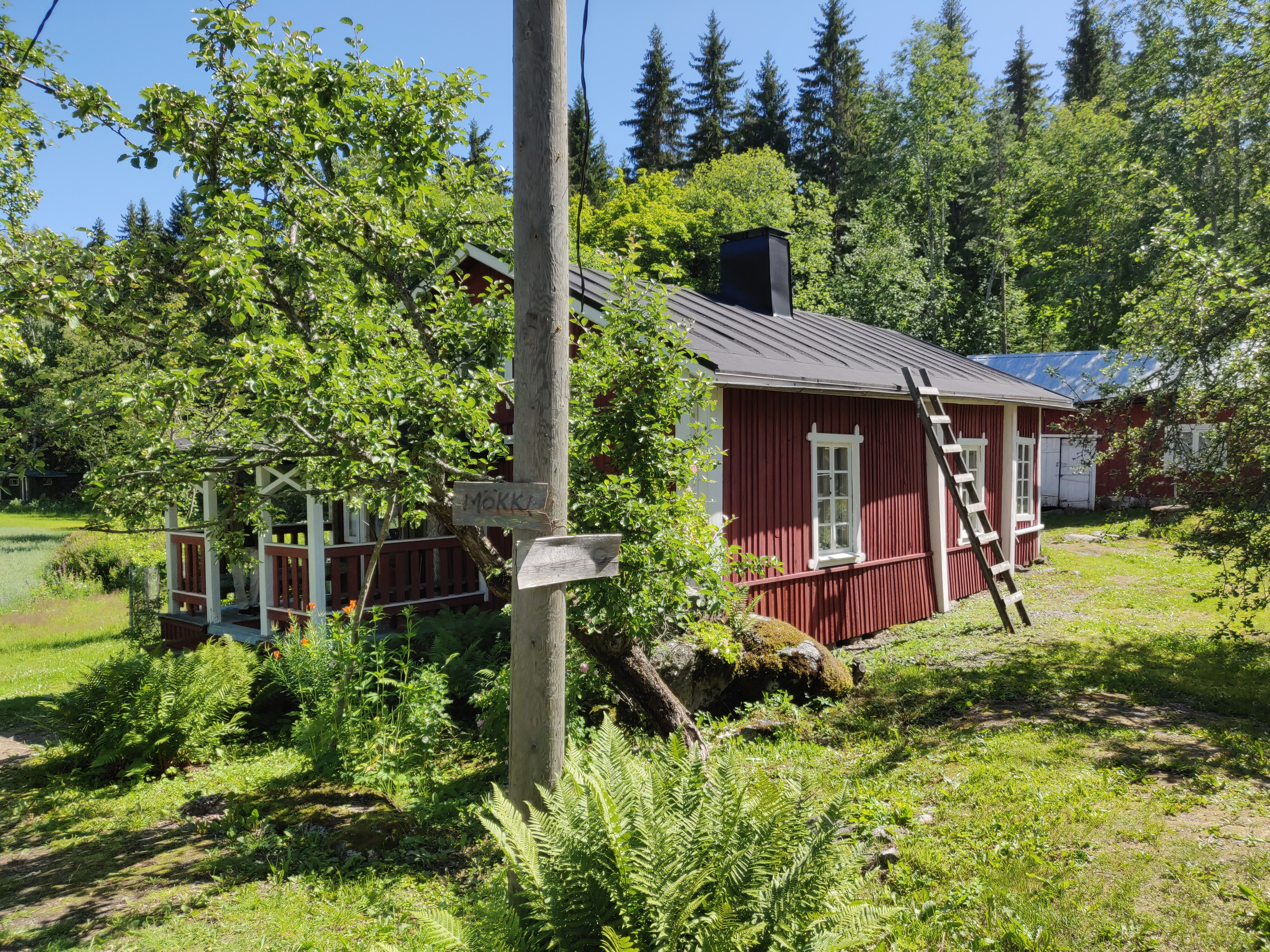
The cottage of Enni In Padasjoki, Finland. The cabin is held open for visitors during summer time.
