= Leevi and the Leavings =

Finnish rock band

- Origin: Finland
- Genres: Pop rock; Finnish rock
- Years active: 1978–2003
- Labels: Love (1978–1979); Johanna Kustannus (1979–2003)
- Past members: Gösta Sundqvist; Risto Paananen; Juha Karastie; Niklas Nylund

Leevi and the Leavings was a Finnish pop rock band, active from 1978 to 2003.

The band consisted of Gösta Sundqvist, Risto Paananen, Juha Karastie and Niklas Nylund. Sundqvist was the leader of the band, he composed and wrote all the band's songs as well as being the vocalist. Sundqvist was a very private person who rarely gave interviews or appeared on television, but for several years he wrote and hosted radio comedy programs for YLE in which he appeared as himself together with fictitious characters.

The band's music had a distinctive sound of smooth multilayered synth-pop arrangements often featuring acoustic guitar, with an occasional lead guitar. It was based around Sundqvist's tragicomic lyrics and catchy choruses. Sundqvist's lyrics often deal with the humiliated aspirations and crushed hopes of average people, as in the song "Teuvo, maanteiden kuningas" ("Teuvo, king of the highways"), which tells the story of a reckless boy with dreams of becoming a rally champion, or "Pimeä Tie, Mukavaa Matkaa" ("Dark Road, Farewell") which describes the final moments of a family preparing to commit vehicular suicide after they were unable to afford a place to live. Another recurring theme is bittersweet memories of lost romance, as in the songs "Rin Tin Tin" and "Mitä kuuluu Marja-Leena" ("How Are You Doing, Marja-Leena?").

Sexual themes, considered from somewhat unconventional points of view, feature in many Leevi hits such as "Sopivasti lihava" ("Suitably Fat"), "Kyllikki" and "Unelmia ja toimistohommia" ("Dreams and office work"). Sundqvist sympathized with sexual minorities in the song "Poika nimeltä Päivi" (Boy called Päivi) which is written from the point of view of a character of ambiguous gender and sexuality trying to escape an oppressive small town atmosphere.

Other hits include "Pohjois-Karjala" ("North Karelia"), and "Vasara ja nauloja" ("Hammer and Nails"). The instrumental "Tuhannen markan seteli" ("Thousand Mark Note") from the album "Suuteleminen kielletty" was for many years the theme song of "Urheiluruutu", a major sporting news program, on Finnish television.

Many people rate Sundqvist's work among the best rock lyrics written in Finnish. A television play based on the characters in his songs was produced and broadcast by Finnish TV.

The band was extremely popular, and many of their songs are sung by Finns in karaoke bars. The band was also known for never performing live. On August 15, 2003, Sundqvist died of a sudden heart attack at the age of 46, and the band decided to break up. Surviving band members later formed a band named Leavings-Orkesteri (Leavings-Orchestra), releasing their first album "Arpapeliä" in 2011.

== Albums ==
Leevi and the Leavings have released 16 albums:

- Suuteleminen kielletty (Kissing Forbidden) (1980)
- Mies, joka toi rock 'n' rollin Suomeen (The Man who Brought Rock 'n' Roll into Finland) (1981)
- Kadonnut laakso (The Lost Valley) (1982)
- Raha ja rakkaus (Money and Love) (1985)
- Perjantai, 14. päivä (Friday the 14th) (1986)
- Häntä koipien välissä (Tail Between Legs) (1988)
- Musiikkiluokka (Music Class) (1989)
- Varasteleva joulupukki (Thieving Santa Claus) (1990)
- Raparperitaivas (Rhubarb Heaven) (1991)
- Turkmenialainen tyttöystävä (Turkmenian Girlfriend) (1993)
- Rakkauden planeetta (Planet of Love) (1995)
- Käärmenäyttely (Snake Exhibition) (1996)
- Kerran elämässä (Once in a Lifetime) (1998)
- Bulebule (2000)
- Onnen avaimet (Keys To Happiness) (2002)
- Hopeahääpäivä (Silver Wedding Anniversary) (2003)

== Compilations ==
12 Compilation albums:

- Leevi And The Leavings (1983)
- Salaiset numerot (Secret Numbers) (1986)
- Unelmia ja toiveita (Dreams and Wishes) (1989)
- Menestyksen salaisuus (The Secret to Success) (1992)
- Leevi and the Leavings (Suomen parhaat) (Best Of Finland) (1994)
- Lauluja rakastamisen vaikeudesta (Songs About the Difficulty of Loving) (1994)
- Itkisitkö onnesta / 20 suosikkia (Would You Cry of Happiness / 20 Favorites) (1997)
- Keskiviikko... 40 ensimmäistä hittiä (Wednesday... 40 First Hits) (1997) - peaked at number 2 in the Finnish charts and was in the charts for 134 weeks
- Torstai... 40 seuraavaa hittiä (Thursday... 40 Next Hits) (2001)
- Stereogramofoni (Stereo Gramophone) (2001)
- Keskeneräinen Sinfonia (Unfinished Symphony) (2004)
- Matkamuistoja – kaikki singlet 1978–2003 (Travel Memories - All the Singles 1978-2003) (2008)

== See also ==
- List of best-selling music artists in Finland
- Rock music in Finland
