= Isojärvi National Park =

National park in Finland

- IUCN category II (national park)
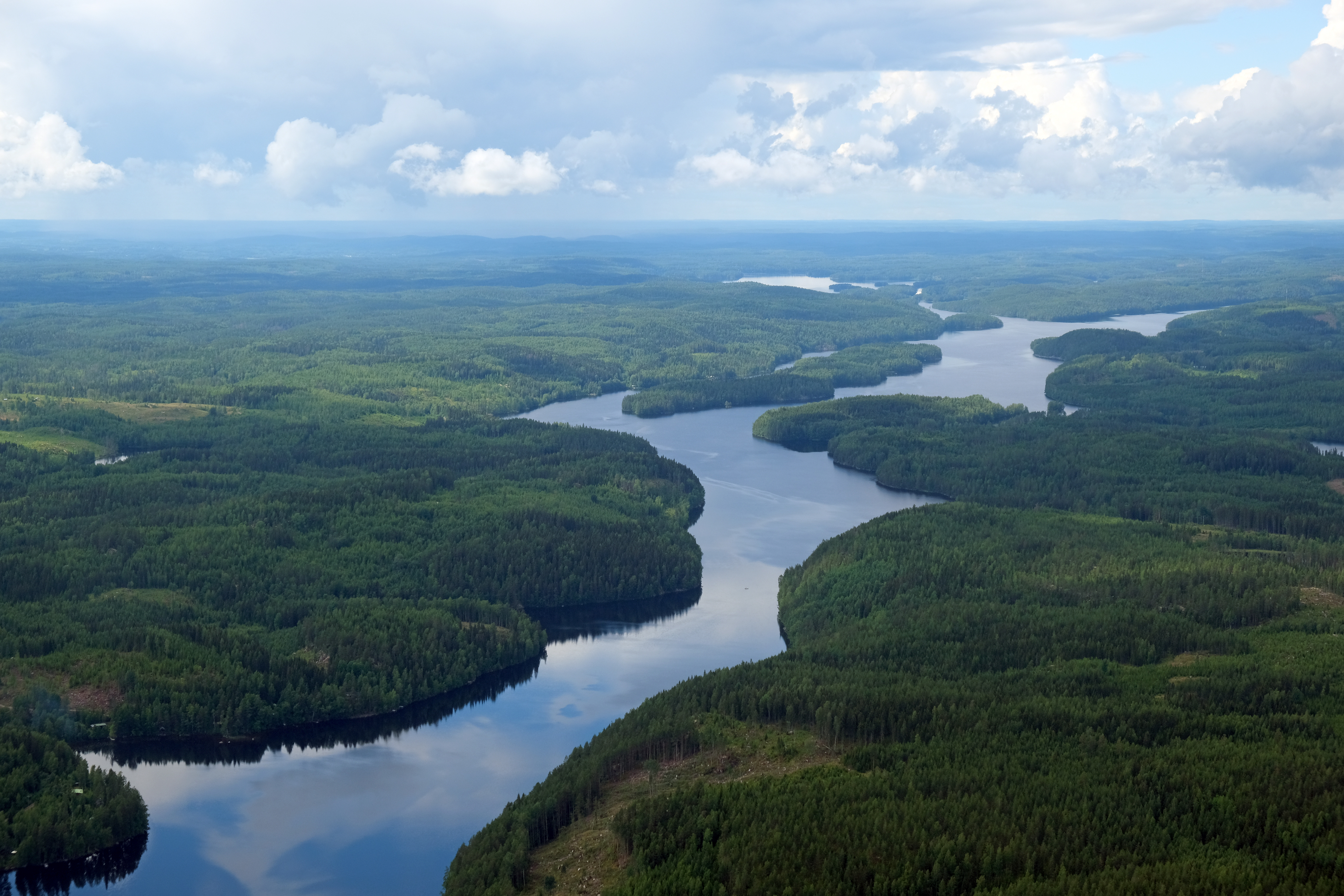
- The lake Isojärvi

- Location within Finland
- Location: Central Finland, Finland
- Coordinates: 61°41′54″N 25°00′39″E
- Area: 19 km^{2} (7.3 sq mi)
- Established: 1982
- Visitors: 24,400 (in 2024)
- Governing body: Metsähallitus
- Website: https://www.luontoon.fi/en/destinations/isojarvi-national-park

Isojärvi National Park (Finnish: Isojärven kansallispuisto) is a national park in Central Finland. It covers 19 square kilometres (7.3 sq mi) and was established in 1982. Its scenery is fluctuating by its level and the vegetation is dominated by Scots pine and Norway spruce forests and bogs. Imprints of early human settlement and cultivation have been found in the area. The national park is located by the lake Isojärvi after which it has got its name.

There are two nature trails (marked with red paint) and several other ring trails (marked with blue paint). Most trails depart from Heretty or Kalalahti parking area. The trails vary in length and difficulty, being between 3.5 km and 20 km long. It is one of the largest parks in the region with over 30 kilometers of trails.

== See also ==
- List of national parks of Finland
- Protected areas of Finland
