= Gösta Sundqvist =

Finnish musician (1957–2003)

Gösta Erik Sundqvist
- Born: 17 May 1957; Espoo, Finland
- Died: 16 August 2003 (aged 46); Espoo, Finland
- Occupations: Musician, radio comedian, record producer
- Years active: 1978–2003
- Known for: Lead singer, songwriter and producer of Leevi and the Leavings

Gösta Erik Sundqvist (17 May 1957 – 16 August 2003) was a Finnish musician, radio comedian and record producer. He was the lead singer of Leevi and the Leavings from the band's formation in the late 1970s until his death, and composed, wrote the lyrics for, and arranged every song the band released. In 1996 he received the prestigious Juha Vainio Award for lyric writing. Sundqvist systematically avoided publicity: Leevi and the Leavings never toured and gave only a single public performance under their own name, at the 1981 Finnish Eurovision preselection. From 1996 onwards he stopped giving interviews altogether and largely withdrew from public life.

Alongside Leevi and the Leavings, Sundqvist wrote all the songs recorded by the fictional crooner Aarne Tenkanen (performed by radio journalist Kai Järvinen), using a series of pseudonyms. He also created several long-running radio comedy series for Yleisradio (Yle), including Tietokoneenkorjauskurssi ("Computer Repair Course"), Belgialaisia kirjauutuuksia ("Belgian Book Novelties") and, most famously, Koe-eläinpuisto ("Laboratory Animal Park").

== Early life ==
Sundqvist was born in Espoo on 17 May 1957 and spent his earliest years in Helsinki. In 1964 his family moved to the Espoo suburb of Westend. He attended Olari elementary school and later Etelä-Espoon yhteiskoulu. In the early 1970s he was known as a talented footballer, playing for Tapiolan Honka in age groups older than his own. Through his schoolmate and neighbour Jogi Ojamo – who lived on the same street and whose sister brought home records for the two boys to listen to – Sundqvist discovered Jethro Tull around the age of 12 or 13. Jethro Tull, along with the MC5 album Kick Out the Jams, sparked his interest in music; he began to grow his hair long and gave up organised football.

With Ojamo, Sundqvist also produced a homemade magazine called Virtaset, which the pair posted on the school noticeboard. He began playing in a rehearsal band with Reijo Inna and, occasionally, classmate Jari Malinen, initially covering Black Sabbath. In 1971 Ojamo introduced Sundqvist to Juha Partanen, who would later write a memoir about the singer's youth. Shortly afterwards Sundqvist's parents divorced and he moved with his mother and sisters to the Helsinki district of Meilahti. At some point during his final year of middle school he stopped attending classes altogether; according to Inna he had been a top student who coasted without effort, but Partanen recalled that Sundqvist was simply convinced he did not need formal schooling for what he wanted to do.

In a 1984 Soundi interview Sundqvist described his school years as isolated and marked by his deliberately provocative appearance – backcombed hair, makeup and women's skirts – which, he said, left PE teachers convinced he needed to be committed. Partanen has cautioned that his own recollections of the early 1970s contain no memory of Sundqvist wearing makeup, apart from one occasion when the friends experimented with it together.

=== First bands and influences ===
In 1972 Sundqvist travelled with Inna and Partanen to the Inna family farm in Iittala for a summer of rehearsing in a group then called "Funeral Procession". Inna's taste for dance music and humppa would be a decisive influence on the later Leavings sound, pushing Sundqvist toward melodic, iskelmä-like material. In photos of the session Sundqvist posed with his face hidden behind his hair, in the manner of Cyrano de Bergerac, a character he openly identified with.

Partanen regarded the various short-lived bands of this period as "finger exercises" – Sundqvist had no interest in performing live and instead recorded large numbers of his own compositions on tape. The early lyrics were in English and drew on myth and chivalric romance, punctuated by flute riffs in the style of Jethro Tull's Ian Anderson. Sundqvist dressed the part, with curled hair, a long Mediterranean-blue velvet coat and light-brown Robin Hood-style moccasin boots, and adopted as his personal motto a line from the Jethro Tull song "Life Is a Long Song": "life is a long song, but the tune ends too soon for us all…" After Jethro Tull, his greatest musical love was the British folk-revival group Amazing Blondel and especially their album England; the group's next name, "Troubadour", reflected this new interest in British lute-accompanied song. He was also drawn to Italian progressive rock, particularly La Bottega dell'Arte and Premiata Forneria Marconi. The group's only public appearance in this era was on the roof of the Inna family house on Mansikkatie in Westend in March 1973; a production company, Strawb Production, was named after the street and would continue to be credited on Leevi and the Leavings releases. When Inna left for an exchange year in the United States in August 1974, the friends' band activities were put on hold.

In the mid-1970s Sundqvist briefly took up ballet but abandoned it after reportedly experiencing a skipped heartbeat mid-jump; heart symptoms would also curtail his football playing. He went through periods of withdrawal during which he claimed to have no friends and to want none. By 1976 he had overcome an earlier distaste for books and was reading widely, including Martin Luther, and was writing mostly poetry. Toward the end of the decade he moved into central Helsinki, to Ratakatu, working for his father's renovation firm and as the caretaker of his own apartment building.

== Music career ==
=== Leevi and the Leavings ===
In a 1978 interview with Partanen, Sundqvist dated the actual formation of Leevi and the Leavings to the autumn of 1977. Inna and Risto Paananen had met while doing their military service at the Häme Jaeger Battalion in Hämeenlinna; a few months later Inna invited Paananen to the Iittala cottage to play bass. Sundqvist and his friends had already been making Stereogramofoni cassettes on which they parodied real radio shows and bands; among the fictitious acts appearing on the tapes were The Babyboys, the Kyösti Salmenoksa Quintet, and Leevi and the Leavings. About ten of these cassettes were produced and circulated privately, with Sundqvist writing most of the sketches; he wanted the material to remain within a close circle of roughly twenty friends, feeling he had nothing to prove to anyone. In 1978 the band made an appearance at the Äimä-Rock festival in Iittala under the pseudonyms "Tarmo Dynamo" and "Rife Paananen ja kyytipojat".

Inna was determined that the group should release a proper record. He secretly sent two cassette songs – "Mitä kuuluu, Marja-Leena?" and "Rakas Annika…" – to Atte Blom at Love Records; Sundqvist himself would not have offered the songs for release. The label agreed to fund a single, which appeared in 1978. Sundqvist initially resisted recording a full album and wanted to release double singles instead, two of which appeared in 1979. That same year guitarist Juha Karastie joined. Inna, who felt the group did not yet have enough material for an LP and who wanted it to remain an anonymous singles-only project, left soon after; his place on drums was taken by Paananen's old schoolmate Jarmo Leivo.

From the beginning Sundqvist was firmly in creative control, and the public identified the band primarily with him. The classic line-up was completed in 1987 when Niklas Nylund took over on drums, and remained intact to the end. Haije Sundqvist's backing vocals were a defining feature of the Leevi and the Leavings sound from the beginning. Under their own name the group made only one public appearance, at the Finnish Eurovision preselection in 1981, performing "Sinisilmä, mansikkasuu"; they were eliminated in the heats. Sundqvist treated album sleeves as equal in importance to the songs themselves; in a 1989 interview with Roo Ketvel he said the covers mattered as much as the music. The cover art, based on Sundqvist's ideas and executed under his close supervision, was the work primarily of Mikko Kurenniemi and Timo Puranen.

=== Other projects ===
At the turn of the 1970s and 1980s Sundqvist also worked as a producer for other acts, including The Crinolettes, in which both of his sisters sang. Another of his production projects was The Silver, whose two singles were released on Johanna Records' Black Label imprint; the identities of the avant-garde noise project's members remained a mystery until Yle identified its leader in 2015.

In 1989 the actress Tanja-Lotta Räikkä performed Sundqvist's composition "Huominen Eurooppa" in the Finnish Eurovision preselection. Sundqvist appeared as a guest vocalist on Liisa Akimof's single "Viiden pennin paskiainen" (1993) and on Sipe Santapukki's "Häiriintynyt kuu" (2002).

Sundqvist's radio work introduced the wider Finnish public to Aarne Tenkanen, a recurring fictional character in his radio series played (and still played) by journalist Kai Järvinen. Sundqvist wrote and composed Tenkanen's songs under pseudonyms including "L. Samarialainen", "Erkki Salpola" and "Pentti Jormanainen". The recording career began in 1995 with the single "Hemaisevan seksikäs pörröpää", which became a major hit and led to a sequence of albums: Iso pitkä (1996), Tenkasen tyttökalenteri (1998), Tenho (2001) and, posthumously, Ajan platinaa (2010).

== Radio comedy career ==
Sundqvist had a parallel career of more than a decade as a radio comedian. It began no later than the end of 1988 with Gösta Sundqvist esittää ("Gösta Sundqvist Presents") on Rockradio. His next series, Tietokoneenkorjauskurssi, launched in 1990 shortly after the start of Radiomafia. In 1992 the show was renamed Belgialaisia kirjauutuuksia, and from the beginning of 1993 Belgialaisia kirjaharvinaisuuksia. Many of the formal conventions that would later define Koe-eläinpuisto were already in place. Koe-eläinpuisto itself began in September 1993 and ran until 2003. His final series, Teinitalo ("Teen House"), aired its last episode on the evening of Friday, 15 August 2003 – a few hours before his death. In all, some 700 episodes of Sundqvist's radio comedies were broadcast between 1988 and 2003.

In the radio plays Sundqvist blended fact and fiction, and occasionally used real people as characters. He typically played a radio reporter who – alone or with a "colleague" – broadcast "live" from some unusual location. Short sketches alternated with musical interludes thematically linked to the preceding sketch. Some episodes formed larger arcs, such as trilogies set in Africa, Russia and South America; in each, familiar characters turned up "by coincidence". One Finnish setting was a sewer swimming pool dug under Helsinki's Market Square.

The shows remained popular to the end, as evidenced by their weekend prime-time slots in the final years. Reruns of Koe-eläinpuisto began in 2004 and continued as recently as 2015 on Yle Radio Suomi. The most popular character to emerge from Koe-eläinpuisto was the fictional tram driver Aarne Tenkanen, through whom Sundqvist could channel his inner Junnu Vainio in the spirit of the older crooner's "big boys' songs".

== Final years ==
During the last seven years of his life Sundqvist refused all interviews, including from Soundi, which had previously published extensive pieces about him; he promised editor-in-chief Timo Kanerva that he would agree to an interview when he turned 50. Ilta-Sanomat did publish an interview a week after his death, based on a conversation conducted shortly before, although it had not originally been intended for publication. According to Partanen, Sundqvist also kept his distance from people generally during these years. In the late 1990s he wrote occasionally as a columnist for the free newspaper Alueuutiset.

Sundqvist drank very little alcohol but had smoked heavily since his teens. In his last years he began paying closer attention to his health: he had put on considerable weight over the years, so after moving out of Helsinki he bought a bicycle and began exercising regularly. On his doctor's advice he also gave up smoking.

Sundqvist died of a myocardial infarction at his home in Espoo on 16 August 2003, aged 46. Paananen had spoken with him by phone a few days before; their plan had been to make the next album "happy pop". On his final evening they went into the studio and recorded a new version of a song from the previous album, which remained officially unreleased. After Sundqvist's death Paananen, Karastie and Nylund jointly decided to end the band, feeling that Leevi and the Leavings without Sundqvist was unthinkable. In 2011 they announced a return under the name Leavings-Orkesteri, playing both new material and Leavings songs live.

Four memorial concerts, Malja Göstalle ("A Toast to Gösta"), were held in autumn 2004, with Finnish artists such as Ismo Alanko, Ilkka Alanko, Tuomari Nurmio, Maarit Hurmerinta, Timo Rautiainen, Samuli Putro, Marjo Leinonen and Pauli Hanhiniemi performing Leevi and the Leavings songs. A broadcast edit was televised in November 2004 under the title Isälle Göstalta ("From Gösta to Dad"). Two of the concerts took place at the Huvilateltta marquee during the Helsinki Festival on 30 and 31 August 2004, a third at the main hall of Tampere Hall on 11 September 2004, and a fourth at Sibelius Hall in Lahti.

Sundqvist is buried at Kellonummi cemetery in Espoo.

== Personal life ==
Sundqvist lived for most of his life in the Helsinki district of Punavuori, first on Ratakatu and later on Kapteeninkatu, before moving back to his native Espoo in his final years. He married relatively young and was the father of two daughters. His father was a Finland-Swedish speaker and his mother a Karelian evacuee from Heinjoki. He had two sisters, Hanni (born 1954) and Haije (born 1962). Haije sang on all Leevi and the Leavings records, while Hanni appeared in her brother's radio shows and on the cover of the double-single Nuoret miljonäärit.

An enthusiastic hunter, Sundqvist often expressed forthright views on private motoring and consumerism, wearing tracksuits and wind suits almost exclusively as a form of statement. He was deeply concerned about the environment and raised ecological themes in interviews, even while mocking apocalyptic soothsayers. He held no driving licence, reasoning that cars ought only to be driven when carrying at least three people – though he was happy to be driven by others. In the 1980s and 1990s he enjoyed walking the streets of central Helsinki observing people and particularly liked the atmosphere of small ground-floor shops. In his youth he worked in his father's construction firm and in the 1980s as a building caretaker, but had given up both jobs by 1989.

According to Nylund, Sundqvist was shy and not easy to get close to. Uncompromising and self-directed, he preferred to abandon a project rather than relinquish control of it. Although he spent most of his life in central Helsinki, he rejected the "Stadi" (Helsinki-urban) identity, describing the people he found most foolish as exactly those who cultivated it.

=== Avoidance of publicity ===
Sundqvist actively cultivated a mysterious public image; even his bandmates found his personality hard to describe. Throughout the Leavings' career he played with the band's media persona – originally the intention had been to conceal the members' names altogether. Although that plan was unsuccessful, he pursued the same game by refusing to tour and by writing ambiguous lyrics. His fellow band members have said that he extended the game to journalists, and that his idiosyncratic interview answers could be as fictional as his lyrics. He nonetheless followed press coverage of the band closely and was pleased by positive responses, especially to the music itself.

Band members and Sundqvist himself attributed the scarcity of public appearances chiefly to the fact that music-making was a hobby among others for the group, and that they did not make music for money. Sundqvist also admitted to being relatively home-loving and uninterested in the life of a touring musician; he preferred to spend time with his family, which touring would have curtailed. He disliked gold and platinum record award ceremonies, which he called "awful occasions" but attended for the sake of the record company. He did not move in music-industry circles and chose his friends carefully. From 1996 onward, Partanen recounts, Sundqvist kept his distance not only from the press but from people in general.

=== Football and other interests ===
Sundqvist was a passionate follower of football. By the late 1970s he had assembled a large archive of videotaped matches at his Ratakatu flat, with a particular interest in team structures and tactics. From the 1980s onward he ran the Helsinki football club Johanneksen Dynamo, which he had founded in 1985; under his leadership it rose as high as the Finnish second division before merging with FC Norssi in 1995. Sundqvist coined the new name Atlantis FC but stepped back from club activities after the merger. Football had by then consumed much of the income from his other work.

Sundqvist said he took football far more seriously than music-making – not as a hobby but as a way of life. He exaggerated the contrast in interviews, however, routinely claiming that football was the most important thing in his life and music merely a hobby alongside it, whereas in reality it was the other way around. Several Dynamo players have said that Sundqvist was not a particularly gifted coach, but had a clear vision for the team and gave his players very good practical conditions in which to play.

He was also a passionate record collector, building up and selling off a collection of several thousand albums more than once. Beyond music, he loved films and collected model cars.

== Artistic profile ==
Sundqvist was sometimes known by the nickname "Göde". Before Leevi and the Leavings he typically adopted pseudonyms taken from legendary characters, such as "Cyrano" or "Erich". Later he used names including "L. Samarialainen", "Pentti Jormanainen", "Erkki Salpola" and "Erik Kääriäinen", under which, for example, he was credited on Aarne Tenkanen's albums.

=== Musician ===
Sundqvist composed and wrote the lyrics for every Leevi and the Leavings song. The band's style has been described as Finnish rock that blurs the lines between rock and iskelmä. The iskelmä flavour of the early material was at least partly intentional, Sundqvist wanting to mock "self-important cockerels who think they are some kind of damn rock-and-roll stars". From the outset he also experimented with other styles: disco on the second album, rockabilly and synth-pop on the third. Critic Tero Lietteen has described Sundqvist's output as defined by melodicism and an acoustic sensibility borrowed from British folk music, and Sundqvist himself said that melody was what mattered most to him. His greatest inspirations were Jethro Tull, Ian Anderson and Amazing Blondel; in a 1984 Soundi interview he named U2 as his favourite band. Besides progressive rock he also loved classical music – particularly Sergei Rachmaninoff – and Italian schlager, whose ingenious arrangements made a lasting impression on him. Sundqvist compared himself as a composer to the early Finnish iskelmä songwriter Veikko Samuli.

As a teenager he had opened up compact cassettes and reversed the tape to listen to music backwards, picking up studio ideas in the process. Nylund has said the group's music contains no rests, which made it difficult for him to follow the internal structure of the songs; the pieces could be illogical yet were not technically demanding to play.

Despite all of this, Sundqvist did not regard himself as a musician.

=== Lyricist ===
Sundqvist's lyric-writing drew on the Finnish schlager tradition, and he cited Reino Helismaa and Sauvo Puhtila as influences; in 1996 he named Juha Vainio as his single most important model. His favourite author was Anton Chekhov, whose tragicomedy he found inspirational. As a storyteller he likened himself to the pulp novelist Mauri Sariola and the director-screenwriter Aarne Tarkas. He rarely came into the studio with finished lyrics; instead, he tended to complete them once the rest of the song was done, sometimes sending the others out for coffee in order to write in peace. According to Paananen, he also kept the stories to himself to prevent the band from inadvertently giving away the ending in the arrangement.

Sundqvist was uncomfortable with the "voice of Finnishness" label that was sometimes applied to him, saying that he felt more Belgian than Finnish in outlook. Nylund has suggested that Sundqvist deliberately played with these images: "This loser-man story can be found just as well in Iznogoud or Donald Duck; it is universal." In the history Jee jee jee: suomalaisen rockin historia, the Leavings' lyrical style is characterised as "tragicomic", a blend of irony and empathy, tragedy and comedy; although Sundqvist viewed his characters through comedy, he dealt with fundamental questions of life more deeply than many who tried in earnest. Kolmas nainen's Sakari Pesola called the style "nationalist-romantic and parodic". Tero Valkonen has observed that the lyrics are characterised by absurd narratives and a singer who refrains from judging his characters' actions.

Reviewing the album Onnen avaimet in Soundi, Jarkko Fräntilä wrote that "some of Gösta Sundqvist's creations have become part of Finnish identity" and described the most famous songs as "mini-novels in song form". Reviewing the compilation Torstai... 40 seuraavaa hittiä, Pertti Ojala praised Sundqvist's sharp eye for "Finnish everyday life, machismo and extreme hickishness", and commended the double-entendre lyrics. In its citation for the Juha Vainio Award, the jury noted that the lyrics painted a "Finnish soulscape" as seen by a "wise caretaker", and that the songs "help us Finns understand each other and perhaps ourselves a little as well". Anssi Mehtälä of Länsi-Savo called Sundqvist "a great Finnish storyteller" and "the distiller of the Finnish national character".

The singer-songwriter Olavi Uusivirta has written of Sundqvist:

Wherever there is a taboo or a politically incorrect subject, Sundqvist is there, poking with his quill. Through the songs of Leevi and the Leavings speak the lonely, the marginalised, village madmen, criminals, whores, transvestites, single mothers, children of divorce – the hushed-over underside of carefully guarded Nordic welfare. Gösta Sundqvist's artistic ethos was a project on the scale of a human life: to make the ugly and the hidden honestly beautiful and visible.

Sundqvist resisted readings that took his lyrics to refer to his own life, and declined to interpret them even for his own bandmates. His environmental concerns came through strongly on the album Raparperitaivas, whose title track contains the line "Man has done nothing but bring pain and destroy his planet". The follow-up Turkmenialainen tyttöystävä was lighter in tone, while Rakkauden planeetta was overtly socially engaged; Sundqvist wanted to release it in cardboard sleeves, but these would not have fitted supermarket anti-theft systems.

== Legacy ==
The 2006 PMMP album Leskiäidin tyttäret contains a song, "Henkilökohtaisesti", explicitly dedicated to Leevi and the Leavings. Paula Vesala has called Sundqvist "a kind of demigod" to her and his work "the most beloved of national treasures". Music journalist Ilkka Mattila has argued that "Sundqvist-style stories and melodies have been the public's point of entry into PMMP's songs". Jarkko Martikainen of YUP has said that he has tried to adopt from Sundqvist "that attitude that a song need not make strong claims", describing him as a near-genius and "an extremely demanding lyricist who requires real concentration". Apulanta's drummer Sipe Santapukki has said he cannot find "fine enough words" for the band that changed his life and represents perfection to him. The actress Mari Rantasila has named Sundqvist as her greatest influence as a lyricist. Antti Heikki Pesonen has cited the Leavings as a major influence on his 2014 film Päin seinää: "Sundqvist never moralised. The film has the same thing: there are no goodies or baddies, the characters move in a grey area, but each has a heart." The film's soundtrack also includes Leevi and the Leavings songs.

=== Honours ===
Sundqvist received the Juha Vainio Award for lyric writing in 1996; he did not collect it at the ceremony held during the Kotka Maritime Festival but only later. Leevi and the Leavings were named Band of the Year at the 1995 Emma Gaala. In 2005 the Espoo city council considered a proposal to erect a memorial to Sundqvist, but the cultural board decided not to take the matter further.

=== Works about Sundqvist ===
Timo Kalevi Forss's biography Gösta Sundqvist – Leevi and the Leavingsin dynamo was published by Into in 2017. In July 2018 Yle Radio Suomi broadcast a 20-part radio play, Itkisitkö onnesta? Tarina Gösta Sundqvistista ("Would You Weep for Joy? The Story of Gösta Sundqvist"), written and directed by Peter Lindholm. Lindholm has announced plans for a feature film about Sundqvist, originally scheduled to begin shooting in autumn 2021, though as of the end of 2024 no further news about the project had been reported.

== See also ==
- List of songs by Leevi and the Leavings
- Leevi and the Leavings discography

== Bibliography ==
- Alanko, Tero et al. (2008). Leevi and the Leavings – Matkamuistoja -kansivihko. Johanna Kustannus.
- Bruun, Seppo et al. (1998). Jee jee jee: Suomalaisen rockin historia. Helsinki: WSOY. ISBN 951-0-22503-7.
- Forss, Timo Kalevi (2017). Gösta Sundqvist – Leevi and the Leavingsin dynamo. Helsinki: Into. ISBN 978-952-264-796-2.
- Ketvel, Roo (1989). Sanoista. Helsinki: Zappa. ISBN 951-8966-00-1.
- Luoto, Santtu (2004). Raparperitaivas. Helsinki: Johnny Kniga. ISBN 951-0-29667-8.
- Partanen, Juha (2006). Cyrano ja hullu koira: Nuoruusvuosia Leevi and the Leavingsin Gösta Sundqvistin kanssa: Muistelma. Espoo: Mediakasvo. ISBN 952-92-0973-8.
