= Kinkomaa =

- Urban area
- View from the road Ahvenlammentie towards Kinkoriutta

- Location in Central Finland
- Country: Finland
- Region: Central Finland
- Sub-region: Jyväskylä sub-region
- Municipality: Muurame

Population (2023)
  - Total: 1,848
- Time zone: UTC+2 (EET)
  - Summer (DST): UTC+3 (EEST)
- Postal code: 40930 KINKOMAA

Kinkomaa is a settlement in Muurame, Finland, on the western shore of lake Päijänne. It borders the Keljonkangas district of Jyväskylä in the north and the former municipality of Säynätsalo in the south. Kinkomaa is not a separate statistical urban area, but may still be referred to as taajama. As of 31 December 2023, the statistical area of Kinkomaa had a population of 1,848.

The first farms in the area, Kinkomaa and Ahvenlampi, were established in the latter half of the 18th century. The settlement began to grow in the early 20th century around a tuberculosis hospital established in 1930 and the nearby factories of Säynätsalo.

== Etymology ==
The name Kinkomaa originally referred to a farm in the area. The element kinko is a dialectal word meaning 'chunk, block', in this context probably referring to boulders. The word appears in the names of nearby Kinkoriutta and Kinkovuori, which are rocky hills.

== Geography ==
Rocky pine forest near Kinkoriutta

=== Location ===
Kinkomaa is located in the northeastern part of Muurame, on the western shore of lake Päijänne and along the highway 6110 (Kinkomaantie), between the Keljonkangas district of Jyväskylä to the north and the former municipality of Säynätsalo to the south. Residential areas of Kinkomaa include Ahvenlampi, Juurakko, Olympiakylä and Pössypohja.

Kinkomaa is one of two urbanized areas in Muurame, along with the municipal center Muuramen kirkonkylä. According to the definition used by Statistics Finland, Kinkomaa is not its own statistical urban area, but instead part of the Jyväskylä urban area, which also covers Säynätsalo. However, it is still referred to as taajama in other sources.

=== Nature ===
In addition to Päijänne, there are smaller lakes or ponds in Kinkomaa, such as Ahvenlampi, Hinkanlampi and Kangaslampi, as well as Sääksjärvi on the border with Jyväskylä. There are two nationally valuable outcrops nearby: Kinkovuori-Raudanriutta in the south and Sarvivuori-Haapavuori in the north. The Kinkoriutta hill is a significant recreational area for residents of Kinkomaa and Keljonkangas.

== History ==
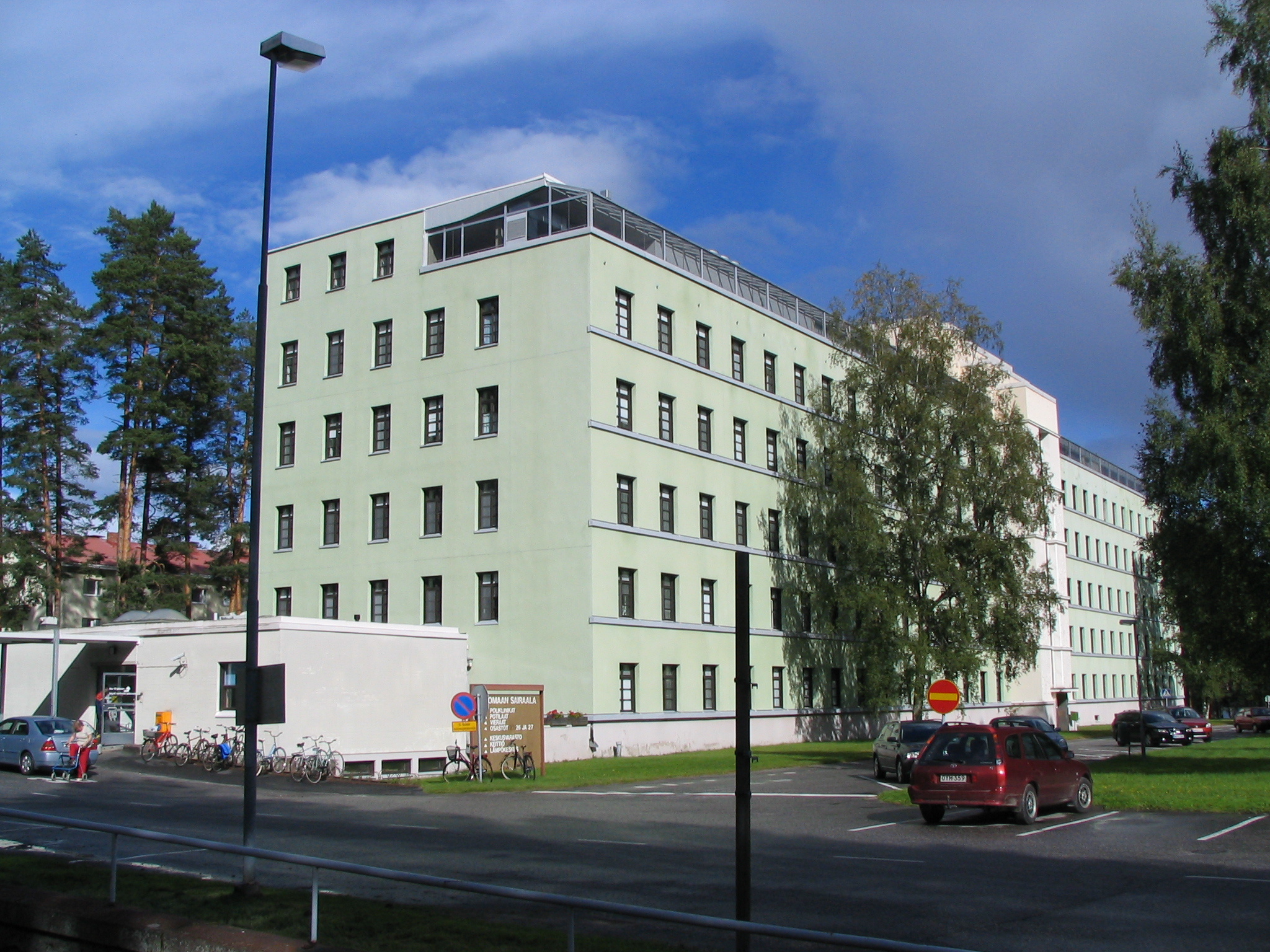
Main building of the hospital in 2007

Since the 16th century, the area of modern Kinkomaa had belonged to Kauppila and Mikkola, the oldest farms in the village of Iso-Muurame. Kauppila was originally located near Mikkola and the river Muuramenjoki, on a small hillock near modern Tervala. The Great Partition in Iso-Muurame began to be carried out in 1791; around that time, Kauppila was split into two farms, of which one was relocated to the site of the Rauvanlahti tenant farm in 1795 and the other to the Ahvenlampi tenant farm in 1797. The name Kauppila was thenceforth used as an alternative name for Ahvenlampi. The Kinkomaa farm was separated from Mikkola in 1762. A tenant farm under it, named Kinkopohja, was established by the owner's brother around 1800. Kinkopohja was later known as Rantala or Ranta.

In 1927, the medical association of Central Finland decided to establish a tuberculosis hospital in the region. Kinkomaa was chosen over the Tiehuhta estate on the shore of lake Peurunka in Laukaa, as the owner of the Kinkomaa farm had agreed to sell the required 25 hectares (62 acres) for a lower price. The hospital was opened in 1930. What had until then been a small, peripheral village began to grow quickly; nearly 400 people moved to Kinkomaa in the 1930s, and services including a school, stores and banks were established.

Growth continued after World War II; in addition to employees of the hospital, many workers of the Säynätsalo factories settled in Kinkomaa, as there was little room for new houses in Säynätsalo. In the 1950s, more new buildings were being built in Kinkomaa than in any other part of Muurame, and many of the houses found today in central Kinkomaa and the Juurakko and Pössypohja residential areas were built during that decade. Olympiakylä (lit. 'Olympic village') is so named because its first houses were built during the 1952 Summer Olympics held in Helsinki. There was also some industry in Kinkomaa, including the wood workshop Kinkomaan Puutyö established in 1955 that later specialized in the production of hockey sticks as Kinko-Puu (relocated to Teollisuuskylä in central Muurame in the 1960s), a tar factory between the 1940s and 1950s, and a concrete product manufacturer founded in 1949. Electricity had been introduced in the 1920s from Korpilahti and Jyväskylä, and by the 1960s, almost every house in Kinkomaa had access to electricity.

After a municipal reform was passed in 1967, a proposal to abolish the municipality of Muurame was made, in which Kinkomaa and southern Muuratsalo would have been transferred to Säynätsalo. Such plans were dropped in 1974, when the municipality's population had passed the threshold of 4,000.

A zoning plan for Kinkomaa was made in 1965 as the first zoning plan made for any part of Muurame; the first area in Muuramen kirkonkylä, Verkkoniemi, was not zoned until 1974. Later expansions include the area between Kinkomaantie and the hospital built in the 1980s, the road Kinkoriutantie in the 1990s and Ahvenlampi in the beginning of the 21st century. The zoning of Olympiakylä did not begin until 2023, when the municipality made a plan to build 144 to 146 new houses in the area. The plan also covers Juurakko, which was part of the area zoned in 1965. Plans for another new residential area between Päijänne and Kinkoriutta, comprising 23 houses, were made in 2026.

== Services ==
=== Modern services ===
There is a school in Kinkomaa for grades 1–6 of peruskoulu, with about 200 students as of 2020. The school was established in 1935; until then, children from Kinkomaa attended the Säynätsalo school, which had been opened in 1922. The first main building was completed in 1936. It was expanded in 1959 and again in 1998. The building, except for the part built in 1998, was deemed unusable in 2011 due to poor indoor air quality, and a temporary building was installed nearby. Renovations were completed in 2016 and an expansion wing was added in 2021. In 2022, a self-service library was opened at the school.

A K-Market grocery store was opened in 2016.

=== Former services ===
The tuberculosis hospital established in 1930 was expanded to include a children's hospital in 1938, which had its own school from 1939 until 1965. After tuberculosis had become less of a threat in the 1960s, patients with other lung diseases, as well as those with skin conditions, began to be treated at the hospital as well. After it was subordinated to the central hospital of Central Finland in 1972, it became a more general hospital. The main building was used for this purpose until 2013. Due to high maintenance costs, the municipality of Muurame sought to demolish the protected building, which was allowed by the Supreme Administrative Court in 2023; at that time, only a small part of the building was in use by a daycare center. The demolition was completed in March 2025.

== Notable buildings ==
The area around the Kinkomaa hospital has been designated as a nationally important built cultural environment (valtakunnallisesti merkittävä rakennettu kulttuuriympäristö) by the Finnish Heritage Agency. The buildings were designed by architects Jussi Paatela and Toivo Paatela, and the architectural style shows a transition from classicism to functionalism. While the main building of the hospital was demolished in 2025, buildings such as the chief physician's house from 1930 and two residential buildings from 1939 and 1956 are still standing.

A collection of buildings are also deemed locally valuable by the Museum of Central Finland, including the Kinkomaa and Ahvenlampi farmyards, the Rantala tenant farm, and various other houses. Both farmyards include 19th-century buildings, but the main buildings are newer. Rantala is owned by the municipality, but is in use by the adult education center of Jyväskylä (Jyväskylän kansalaisopisto). It was renovated in August 2025.

== Notable people ==
- Aleksi Salonen (born 1993), ice hockey player
