= Moksi =

Moksi may refer to:

- Mõksi, a village in the Võru County of Estonia
- Moksi (Korpilahti), since 2009 part of Jyväskylä, Finland
