= Lehtisaari, Säynätsalo =

District of Finland

Coordinates: 62.131°N 25.757°E

Lehtisaari (sometimes spelled Lehtissaari) is a district in Jyväskylä, Finland, in the former municipality of Säynätsalo on an island on Lake Päijänne. Its district number is 32 and has been named after the island of Lehtissaari. The area of the district is 0.7 square kilometres. The district is connected to the island of Säynätsalo by the Louhunsalmi bridge and to Muuratsalo by the Lemmensilta bridge. The terrain of Lehtisaari resembles that of the island of Säynätsalo but the surface varies more.

== History ==
Lehtisaari or Lehtissaari was a part of Jämsä until 1861, when Korpilahti became its own parish. In 1921, the island was transferred to the new Muurame municipality. While Säynätsalo was separated from Muurame in 1924, Lehtisaari only became a part of it in 1935. Lehtisaari became a district of Jyväskylä in 1993 when the Säynätsalo municipality was merged into Jyväskylä.
