= Kolepi =

Village in Estonia

- Location within Estonia
- Coordinates: 57°46′35″N 27°03′43″E
- Country: Estonia
- County: Võru County
- Municipality: Võru Parish
- Postal code: 65520

Kolepi is a village in Estonia, in Võru Parish, which belongs to Võru County It has an estimated population of 105 residents. The village is situated north of Ala-Tilga and to the east of Mõksi.
