= Sääksjärvi (Jyväskylä) =

Lake in Jyväskylä and Muurame

- Sääksjärvi beach in June 2017
- Interactive map of Sääksjärvi
- Location: Jyväskylä, Muurame
- Coordinates: 62.174°N 25.734°E
- Primary outflows: stream into Hinkanlampi
- Catchment area: 5.85 km^{2} (2.26 sq mi)
- Basin countries: Finland
- Surface area: 59.974 ha (148.20 acres)
- Average depth: 5.59 m (18.3 ft)
- Max. depth: 16.1 m (53 ft)
- Water volume: 3,352,970 cubic meters (4,385,520 cu yd)
- Shore length^{1}: 3.619 km (2.249 mi)
- Surface elevation: 121.4 m (398 ft)
- ^{1} Shore length is not a well-defined measure.

Sääksjärvi is a lake in the Finnish region of Central Finland, mostly within Jyväskylä but also extending into Muurame. It covers an area of about 60 hectares (150 acres) and its waters flow into Hinkanlampi. The lake's outflow is a locally valuable natural site.

== Geography ==
Sääksjärvi has an area of 59.974 hectares (148.20 acres) and a volume of 3.35 million cubic meters (4,380,000 cu yd). Most of the lake belongs to Jyväskylä, where the residential area of Sarvivuori (part of Keljonkangas) extends to its northern shore, while the Sääksvuori residential area to the west is separated from it by the Orivesi–Jyväskylä railway. The southeastern part of the lake lies in the settlement of Kinkomaa in Muurame. The lake's average depth is 5.59 meters (18.3 ft), while the maximum depth is 16.1 meters (53 ft). The deepest point is found in its southwestern part.

Sääksjärvi has a catchment area of 5.85 square kilometers (2.26 sq mi), covering much of southern Keljonkangas between the Sääksvuori and Sarvivuori hills. The lake's outflow is a 610-meter (2,000 ft) stream that begins from its southeastern part and flows south into Hinkanlampi in Kinkomaa. The surface elevation of Sääksjärvi is 121.4 meters (398 ft) above sea level, while that of Hinkanlampi is 103.8 meters (341 ft), giving the stream a drop of 17.6 meters (58 ft). From Hinkanlampi, the watercourse continues down to Ahvenlampi, whose outlet in turn flows into Päijänne near Säynätsalo.

== Water quality ==
Based on samples taken in November 2020 from a depth of one meter, the water of Sääksjärvi had a pH of 7, a total nitrogen content of 330 μg/l (1.9×10^{−7} oz/cu in), a total phosphorus content of 9.5 μg/l (5.5×10^{−9} oz/cu in), a turbidity of 4.1 FNU and a Secchi depth of 2.5 m (8 ft 2 in).

There is a beach maintained by the city of Jyväskylä on the northern shore of the lake, and the residential association of Keljonkangas maintains the beach for ice swimming during winter. Cyanobacteria blooms are occasionally a problem in the summer, as the lake is somewhat eutrophic and its retention time is quite long.

== Nature ==
The upper course of the lake's outlet into Hinkanlampi, from its source to the road leading to the Olympiakylä neighborhood of Kinkomaa, is classified as a valuable small body of water. The stream first flows through a boulder field for about a hundred meters, which then transitions into fertile mixed forest, in which uncommon plants such as Moehringia trinervia, Geranium robertianum and Impatiens noli-tangere are found, in addition to various more common plants of fertile forests. Plants typical of rocky areas (e.g. Polypodium vulgare), as well as those of wetlands (e.g. Calla palustris), also grow along the stream. After a slow-flowing section, the course becomes steep and rocky before reaching the road. Perch, roach, brook lamprey and European crayfish inhabit the stream.

== History ==
The hydronym Sääksjärvi is found throughout Finland, and is generally a reference to ospreys (sääksi) nesting by the lakes. Seppo Suvanto (1954) suggests that the names of Sääksjärvi and the nearby Sääksvuori hill on the border between Jyväskylä and Muurame may be named after the parish of Sääksmäki, as the border was originally between hunting grounds of Sääksmäki and Pälkäne before the area was settled permanently. In the first land register of the Hämeenlinna slottslän from 1539, Päijänteenpohja (later Keljo) was counted as part of Sääksmäki, while Muurame was counted as part of Pälkäne.
