= Sarvenperä =

- Village
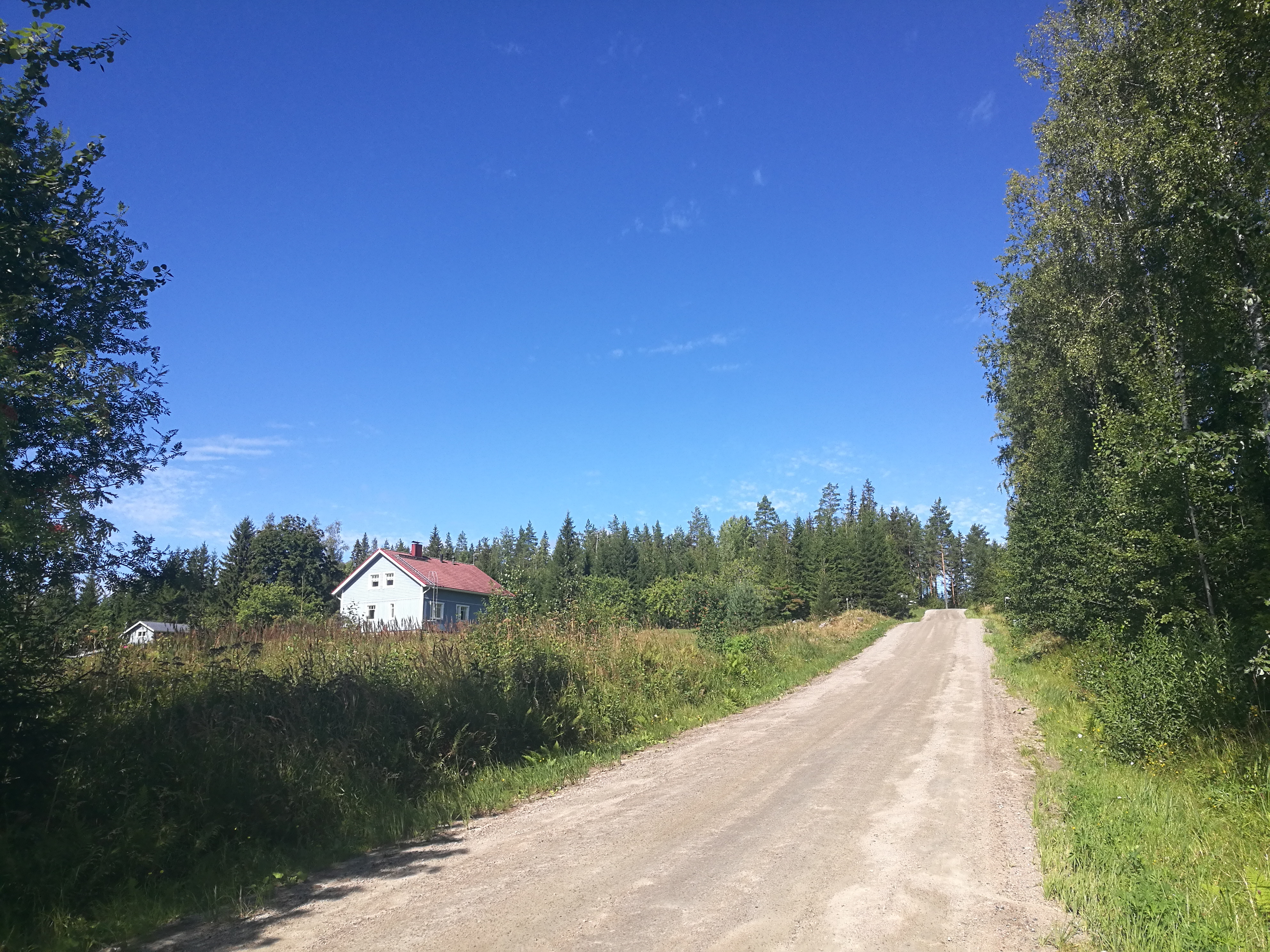
- House near the border with Petäjävesi

- Location in Central Finland Sarvenperä (Finland)
- Coordinates: 62.225°N 25.400°E
- Country: Finland
- Region: Central Finland
- Sub-region: Jyväskylä sub-region
- City: Jyväskylä
- Ward: Korpilahti

Population (2016)
  - Total: 103
- Time zone: UTC+2 (EET)
  - Summer (DST): UTC+3 (EEST)

Sarvenperä is a village in Korpilahti, Jyväskylä, Finland. It is the northernmost village of the former municipality, which was consolidated with the city of Jyväskylä in 2009. As of 2016, Sarvenperä had a population of 103.

The village of Sarvenperä began to develop on state-owned lands in the 18th and 19th centuries, with the first farm in the area being established in 1785.

== Geography ==
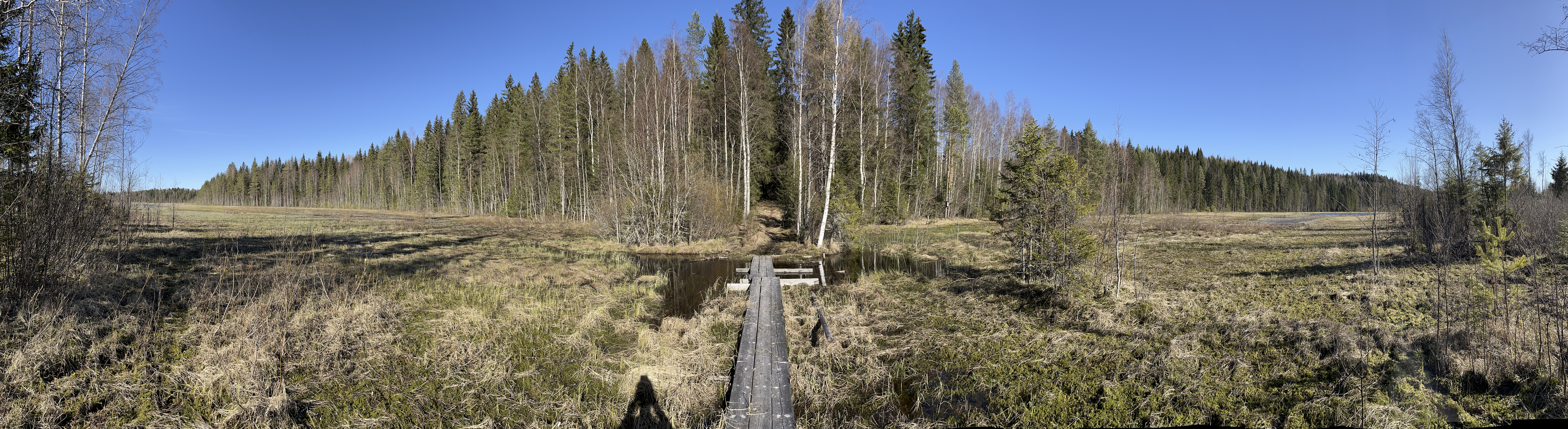
Saukkojärvet, a group of small overgrown lakes.

Sarvenperä is the northernmost village of Korpilahti, located near the border with Petäjävesi and the former Jyväskylän maalaiskunta. The terrain is hilly with small lakes and ponds. Sarvenperä is closely connected to the bigger village of Kuohu to the north, with most traffic between the village and central Jyväskylä going through Kuohu, in contrast to Saukkola and Kalliokylä to the south, where most traffic to the center passes through Isolahti in Muurame instead. The distance to downtown Jyväskylä is roughly 25 kilometers (16 mi).

Most houses in Sarvenperä are concentrated along roads leading to Kuohu, especially around the road Sarvenperäntie.

Sarvenperä is part of the 87th official district of Jyväskylä, named Tikkala after the village of Tikkala. The district also includes Saukkola, Ylä-Muuratjärvi and Moksi.

== History ==
The area of modern Sarvenperä, Saukkola and Tikkala was originally known as Ylä-Muurame and later as Muuratjärvi. The lands were hunting grounds of the Pennanen family from the village of Kuuliala in Pälkäne until the 16th century, when they were sold to the Tikkanen, Saukkonen and Pekkanen families of Savonian origin, who settled in the area. However, Sarvenperä remained uninhabited and was used for hunting and slash-and-burn agriculture by the villagers of Tikkala and Saukkola for the next centuries. The border between Ylä-Muurame and the villages of Kintaus and Vesanka remained in dispute until 1788, when the disputed territory, including much of modern Sarvenperä, was confirmed as part of Ylä-Muurame.

After the Great Partition was finished in Muuratjärvi by 1788, most of the common lands of Muuratjärvi (Tikkala and Saukkola) not divided between farms had become property of the (Swedish, later grand ducal) crown. Landless people were allowed to live on crown lands as tenant farmers. The oldest known farm in what is now Sarvenperä is Hallamäki, established in 1785. More farms were established in the early 19th century, including Heinämäki, Kaistinmäki, Lepomäki, Pössylä and Välilä. By the mid-19th century, there were 20 tenant farms in Sarvenperä as well as some smaller houses without farmland (mäkitupa), inhabited by craftsmen such as shoemakers and tailors.

In the 19th century, people in Sarvenperä sustained themselves mainly through slash-and-burn agriculture supplemented with fishing and hunting. Only small amounts of livestock were kept, as bears and wolves were common in the area.

The previously remote Sarvenperä began developing in the early 20th century. In 1908, a road connecting Sarvenperä to Saukkola and Kuohu was finished. Soon after Finland declared independence from Russia in 1917, it became possible for tenant farmers to redeem their farms for themselves. With the establishment of a school in 1922, Sarvenperä came to be seen as a village in its own right, instead of being part of Saukkola. The village grew significantly between the 1920s and 1930s. Forestry became a significant source of income in Sarvenperä around the mid-20th century, with wood being felled for the sawmill in Kuohu.

The municipalities of Korpilahti and Jyväskylän maalaiskunta were consolidated with the city of Jyväskylä in 2009.

== Services ==
=== School ===
The Sarvenperä school was established in 1922, operating at the Kylmälä farm until a school building was finished in 1930. The building was accompanied by a teacher's residence, which was later converted into an extension of the main building. As the number of students began declining in the 1960s, the school districts of Sarvenperä and Saukkola were united in 1974, with years 1–2 of peruskoulu held in Sarvenperä and 3–6 in Saukkola. All classes were moved to Sarvenperä in 1978 after the Saukkola school was closed.

The Sarvenperä school was closed in 2009. The closest active schools to Sarvenperä are located in Kuohu and Tikkala.

=== Other ===
A municipal bookmobile stops in Sarvenperä.
