= Vespuoli =

- District of Jyväskylä
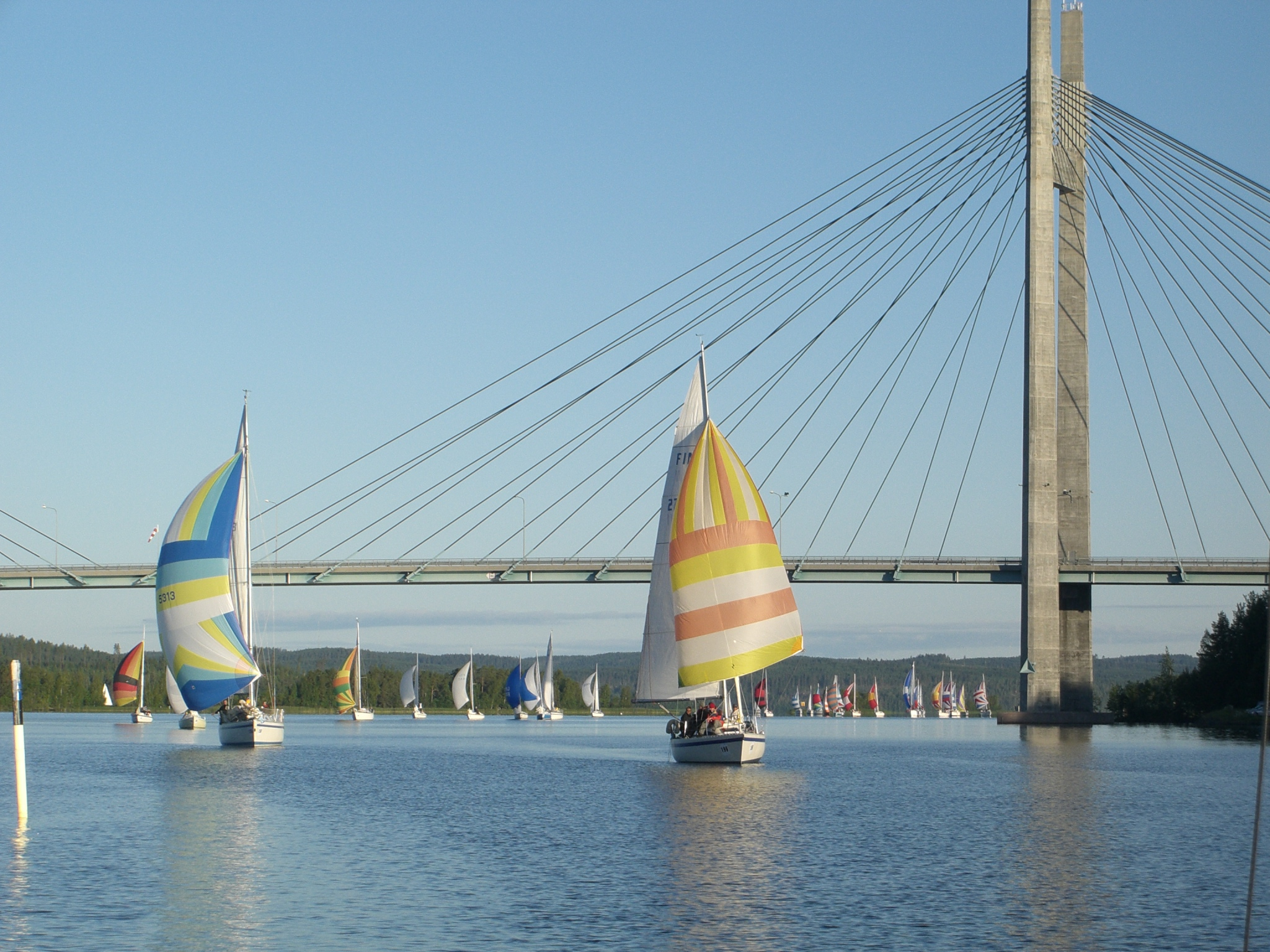
- Kärkinen Bridge during Päijännepurjehdus
- Country: Finland
- Province: Western Finland
- Region: Central Finland
- Sub-region: Jyväskylä sub-region
- City: Jyväskylä
- Ward: Korpilahti

Population (2021-12-31)
  - Total: 448
- Time zone: UTC+2 (EET)
  - Summer (DST): UTC+3 (EEST)
- Postal code: 41880 OITTILA

Vespuoli is a district in Jyväskylä, Finland. It is a part of Korpilahti, which became a part of Jyväskylä in 2009. The area is located on the eastern shores of lake Päijänne, while the rest of Korpilahti is located on the western side.

It is located 35 kilometres (22 mi) from Jyväskylä city centre. The area is connected to Jyväskylä by the large Kärkistensalmi bridge acrossing the lake Päijänne. The villages of Putkilahti and Oittila are located in Vespuoli, and are the official subdivisions of the district. There were 532 permanent inhabitants and 797 summer cottages in Vespuoli as of 2009. At summer time the population of the area more than doubles.

== Geography ==
Vespuoli is separated from the rest of Korpilahti by the lake Päijänne and is connected by the Kärkistensalmi bridge. The district borders the municipalities of Toivakka, Joutsa (Leivonmäki before 2008) and Luhanka. Rutalahti in Leivonmäki partially extends into the Oittila sub-district.

The name Vespuoli (Vesipuoli) means "water half" or "water side", which refers to its location on the eastern side of Päijänne. This is in contrast to Maapuoli ("land half/side"), the western side of Korpilahti.

== History ==
The villages of Oittila and Putkilahti have their origins in the 16th century, when the area was a part of Jämsä.

=== Putkilahti ===
Putkilahti is slightly older, as a farm by that name (later known as Peuha) was established between 1539 and 1543 by Mikko Niilonpoika on lands belonging to the village of Hahkala in Jämsä proper. This was followed by the farm of Könnö in 1578, established by Esko Heikinpoika from Yijälä as well as Nikkilä established by Erkki Juhonpoika on the lands of the Patajoki farm in 1628.

=== Oittila ===
The farm of Oittila was established in 1561 by Erkki Oittinen, a Savonian who settled on former hunting grounds of Sääksmäki by the Synsiänlahti bay. The farm was divided between Erkki's sons in 1603, becoming the farms of Tihtari and Vilppula. In 1708, a new farm called Mäkelä was created out of Tihtari for the owner's nephew.

=== Under Korpilahti ===
Korpilahti gained chapel rights under Jämsä in 1691. The chapel community included not only modern Korpilahti, but also Muurame as well as some smaller surrounding areas. Vespuoli also had its own chapel in Mutanen (near Oittila) since 1701. Plans to fully separate Korpilahti from Jämsä appeared in the 19th century, which led to Korpilahti becoming a separate parish and municipality in 1861.

At the time, the different levels of administrative divisions did not always match each other, which could be seen in Korpilahti: Maapuoli officially belonged to the Häme Province while Vespuoli was under the Mikkeli Province. This issue was fixed in 1870, with the transfer of Vespuoli to the Häme Province. Still, Vespuoli was not connected to the rest of Korpilahti, and in 1889, the landowner Mikko Ilmola from Raidanlahti proposed that Vespuoli should become a municipality and be transferred back to the Mikkeli Province. The proposal was discussed again in 1891 and finally in 1921, after which the plan was abandoned.

In 1922, Haukanmaa, Nisula and Vihijärvi were transferred from Korpilahti to Toivakka, as the areas are significantly closer to Toivakka than to Korpilahti proper. Rutalahti was transferred to Leivonmäki in 1936.

After Korpilahti became a part of Jyväskylä in 2009, Vespuoli became one of its districts.

== Vaarunvuoret ==
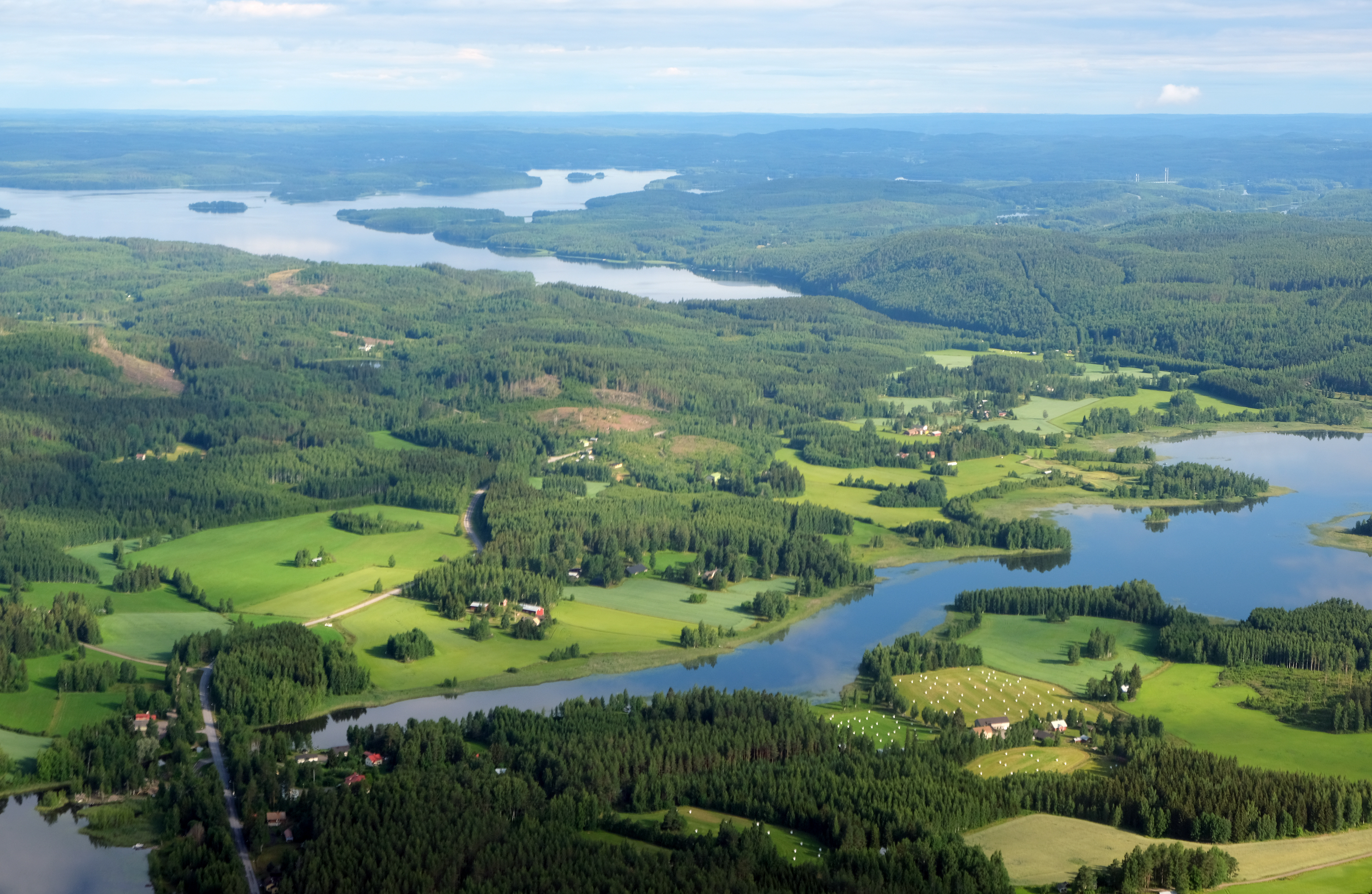
Narrow gulfs of Lake Päijänne in Putkilahti village

The Vaarunvuoret nature reserve is located in Vespuoli. It is known for the Vaarunjyrkkä cliff that descends sharply into Korospohjanlahti Bay. The nature reserve is a home for roughly 60 endangered species. The northernmost European hazel (Corylus avellana) in Finland grow in the Oittila elm grove and the bordering Vaarunniitty meadow. The wych elm (Ulmus glabra) also grows at the very limit of its distribution here. Sheep's-bit (Jasione montana) is a southern species that can be seen on the Vaarunjyrkkä cliff, along with plants native to the fell area, including glaucous meadow-grass (Poa glauca) and alpine saxifrage (Micranthes nivalis).

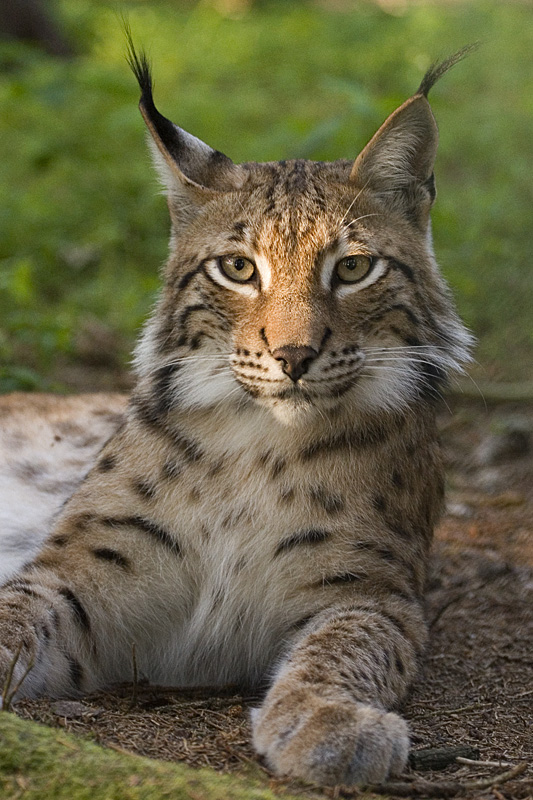
Eurasian lynx is a mammal living in Vespuoli

Notable animals in the area include Siberian flying squirrels, Eurasian three-toed woodpeckers, hazel grouse, bank voles, Eurasian lynx and brown bears.
