= Herman Niittynen =

Finnish farmer and politician (1870–1942)

Herman Niittynen (20 September 1870 – 31 August 1942) was a Finnish farmer and politician, born in Korpilahti. Niittynen was a member of the Parliament of Finland from 24 February to 31 March 1919, representing the National Progressive Party.
