= Muuratsalo =

Island in Central Finland region, Finland

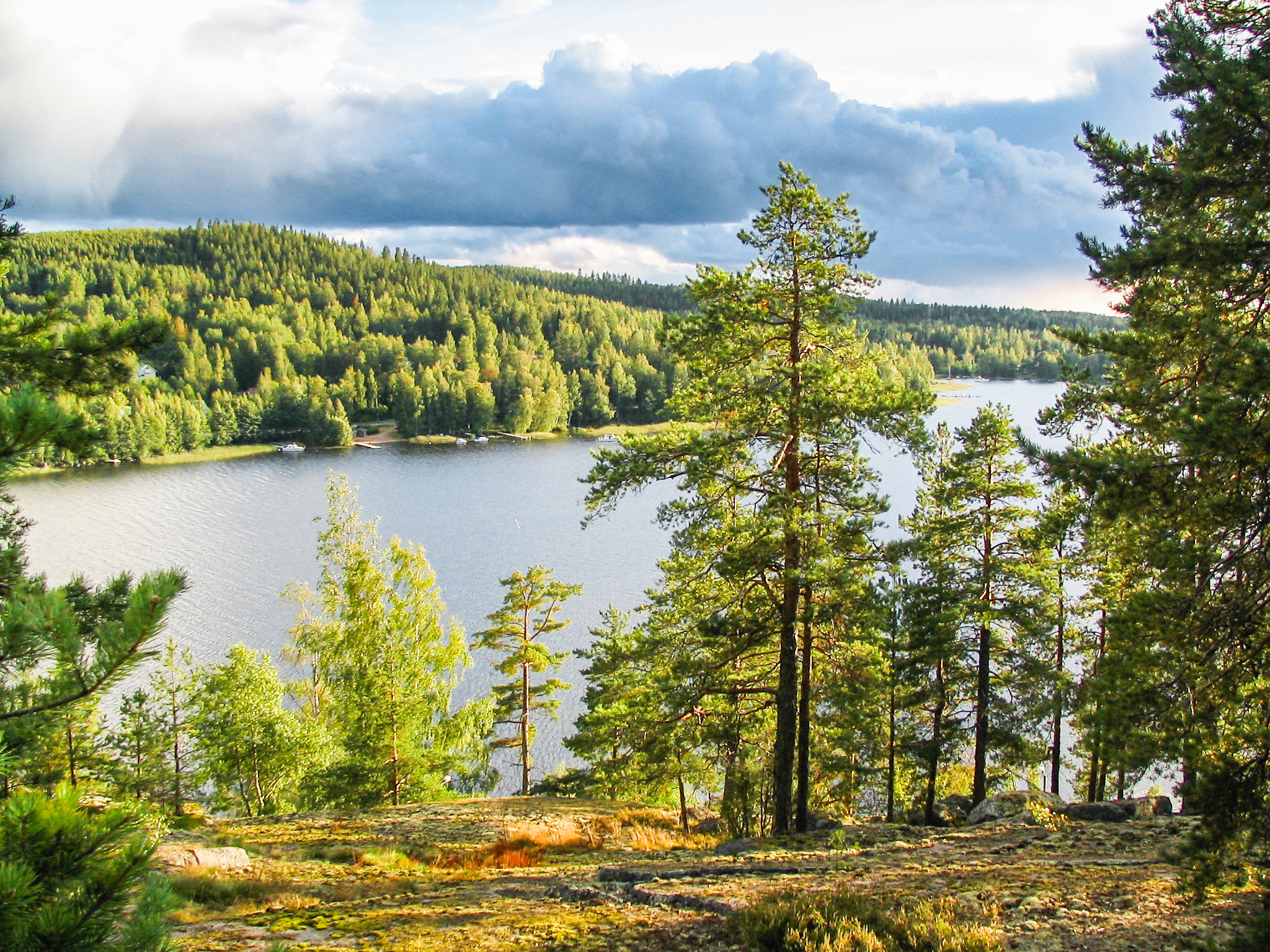
- Muuratsalo and Lake Päijänne seen from Satasarvinen hill in Muuratsalo
- Interactive map of Muuratsalo

Geography
- Coordinates: 62.10°N 25.76°E
- Area: 11 km^{2} (4.2 sq mi)

Administration
- Finland
- Lake: Päijänne
- Municipalities: Jyväskylä, Muurame

Demographics
- Population: 800
- Pop. density: 73/km^{2} (189/sq mi)
- Languages: Finnish

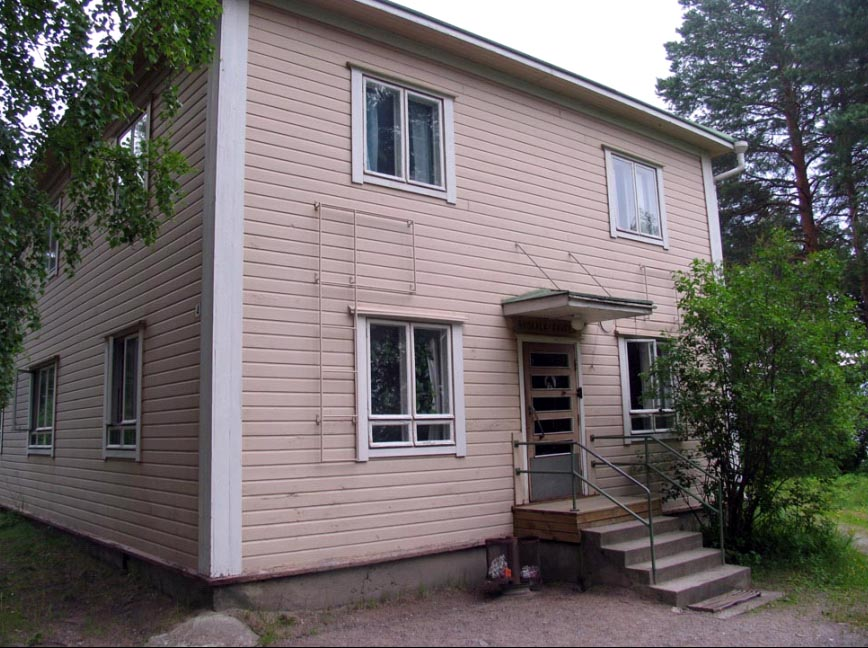
An old cafe house, Ruokala

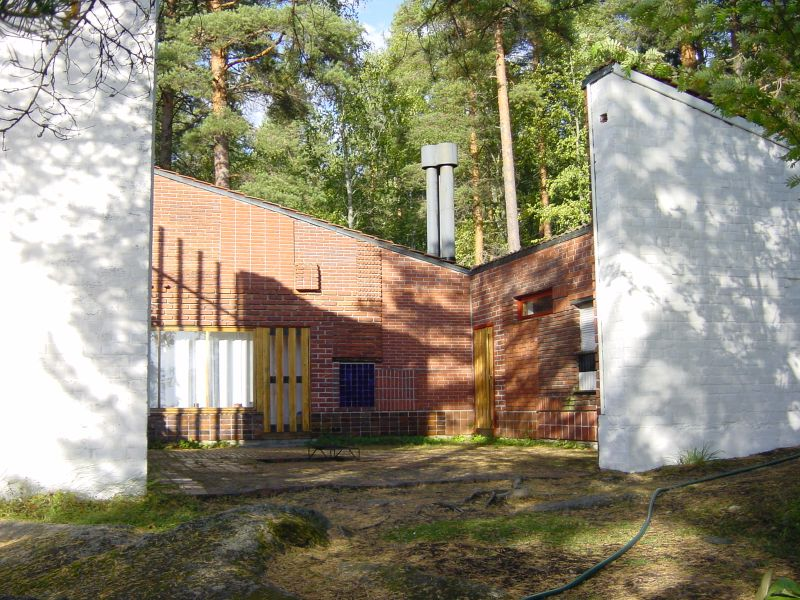
The experimental house by Alvar Aalto

Muuratsalo is an island in lake Päijänne, Finland. The northern part of the island belongs to Jyväskylä and the southern part to Muurame. It is located 14 kilometres (8.7 mi) south from the Jyväskylä city centre and 5 kilometres (3.1 mi) east from Muurame. There are 800 inhabitants in Muuratsalo. The Muuratsalo Experimental House by Alvar Aalto is located on the island. Elissa and Alvar Aalto discovered the place for this jewel of architecture while Säynätsalo Town Hall was under construction on the neighbouring island.

== History ==
Muuratsalo was mentioned in 1782 as Murame Salo. It was originally a part of the Jämsä parish, from 1861 a part of Korpilahti and from 1921 a part of Muurame. Säynätsalo became a separate municipality from Muurame in 1924, but Muuratsalo belonged entirely to Muurame until 1935, when the northern part was given to Säynätsalo. The northern part of Muuratsalo has belonged to Jyväskylä since 1993 as the Säynätsalo municipality was consolidated with Jyväskylä.
