= Rutalahti =

Village in Joutsa, Finland

Coordinates: 61°59′44″N 25°58′23″E

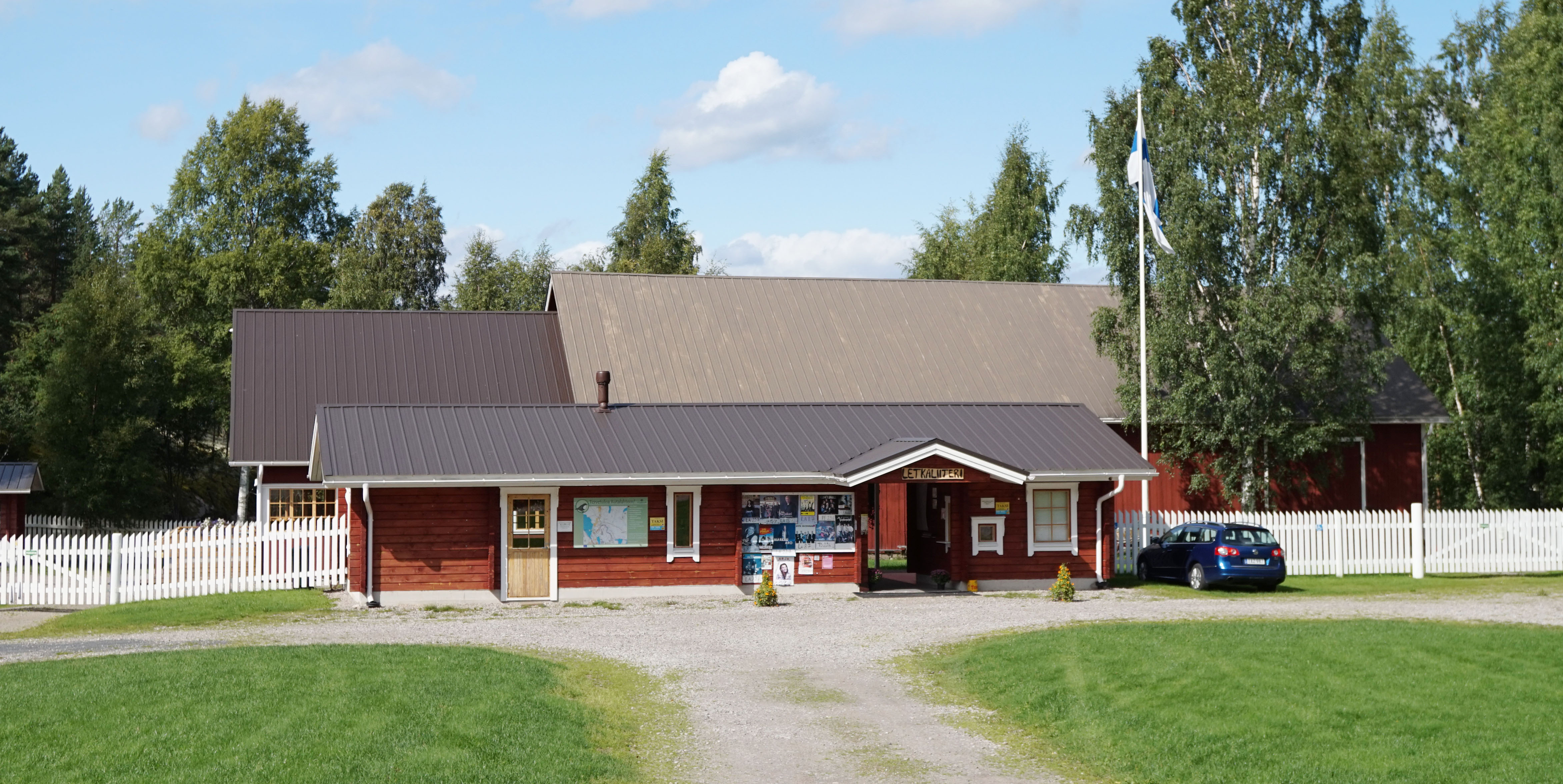
Letkaliiteri

Rutalahti is a village in Leivonmäki, since 2008 a part of the municipality of Joutsa in Central Finland. The distance to Jyväskylä is 40 km. The countryside festival Suo Anteeks has been organized two times, 2005 and 2009.

== Geography ==
Rutalahti is located in the far western part of the old Leivonmäki municipality, close to the borders with Toivakka and Korpilahti (since 2009 part of Jyväskylä). The village is located by the Päijänne and one of its bays, also called Rutalahti, however the bay is mostly within the territory of Toivakka and Korpilahti.

== History ==
Rutalahti is named after the Rutalahti bay of Päijänne, originally held by the people of Sääksmäki as hunting grounds. As a village, Rutalahti was first mentioned in the 1540s. It was originally one of the villages of Vespuoli in Korpilahti, but was transferred to Leivonmäki in 1936. The village became a part of Joutsa with the rest of Leivonmäki in 2008.
