= Moksi (Korpilahti) =

- Village
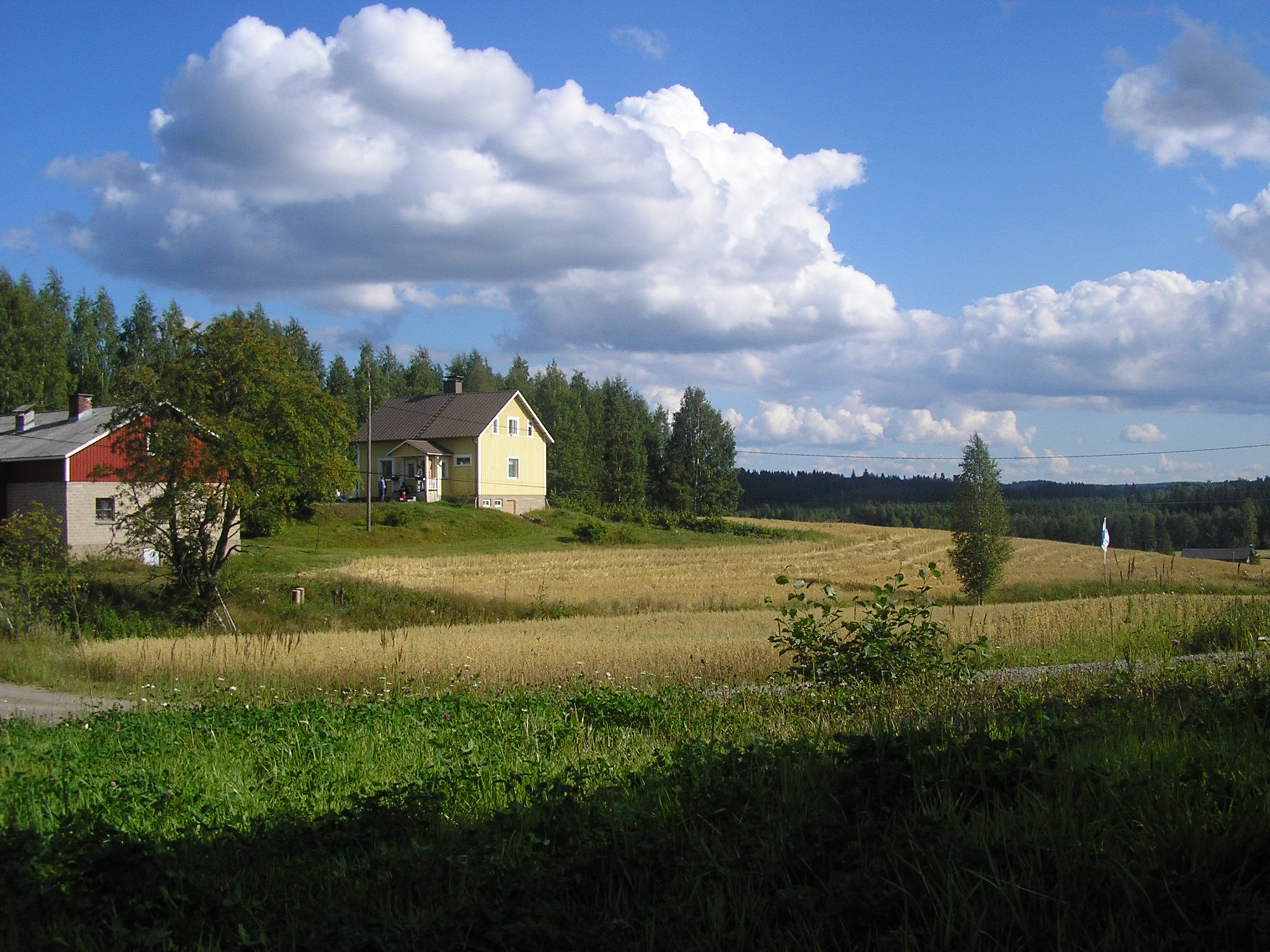
- Interactive map of Moksi
- Coordinates: 62°05′53″N 25°25′27″E
- Country: Finland
- Region: Central Finland
- Sub-region: Jyväskylä sub-region
- City: Jyväskylä
- Ward: Korpilahti

Population (2021-12-31)
  - Total: 141
- Time zone: UTC+2 (EET)
  - Summer (DST): UTC+3 (EEST)
- Postal code: 41840

Moksi is a small village in Korpilahti, since 2009 a part of Jyväskylä. It is located in the Pohjois-Korpilahti statistical area along with Tikkala and Sarvenperä-Saukkola.

The population of the statistical Moksi sub-district (pienalue) in 2021 was 141. Aside from Moksi proper, the statistical area also includes the villages/hamlets of Varrasperä, Humma, Hoikanpohja, Nakkerinpohja, Römminpohja and Hankapohja.

== Geography ==
Moksi is located near a lake named Moksinjärvi, connected to Päijänne by the Vuojoki.

The highest point of Korpilahti (and Jyväskylä since 2009) is Uutelanmäki in the southern part of Moksi, at 257,80 m from sea level.

== History ==
Moksi is named after a local farm, established in 1582. According to Terho Itkonen, the name is of Sámi origin and related to the Inari Sámi word mokseđ meaning "to cross over water". The village name Moksi in Vihti likely has the same origin. As a village, Moksi was first mentioned in 1773 as Moxi. It was a part of Jämsä until 1861 when Korpilahti became an independent municipality. After Korpilahti's consolidation with Jyväskylä in 2009, Moksi became one of its sub-districts.

The village has also been known as Riihijärvi, which may suggest that this name has been used for the Moksinjärvi as well.

== Events ==
A special stage of Rally Finland has often been driven in Moksi. In 2021 and 2022, the route was called Sahloinen-Moksi, Sahloinen being a nearby village further west in Koskenpää.

== Services ==
Moksi does not have a functioning school. The former school building is now used as a meeting hall.
