= Säynätsalo Town Hall =

Building in Finland

Coordinates: 62°8′25″N 25°46′9″E

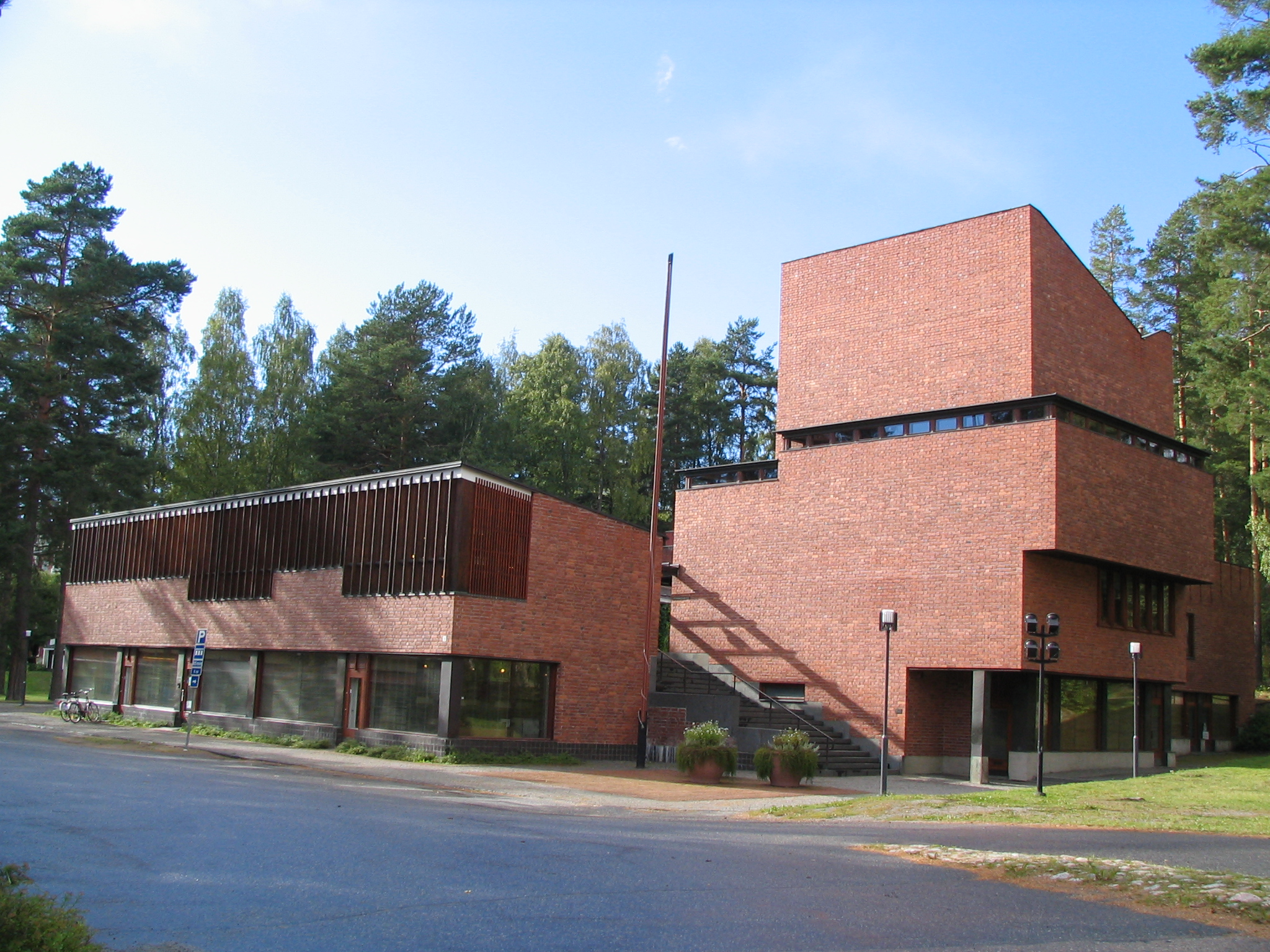
- Säynätsalo Town Hall exterior

UNESCO World Heritage Site
- Official name: Säynätsalo Town Hall, Jyväskylä
- Part of: Aalto Works
- Criteria: Cultural: ii
- Reference: 1752
- Inscription: 2026 (48th Session)

The Säynätsalo Town Hall (Finnish: Säynätsalon kunnantalo) was designed by Finnish architect Alvar Aalto for the municipality of Säynätsalo (merged with the municipality of Jyväskylä in 1993) in Central Finland. It is a multifunction building complex, consisting of two main buildings organised around a central courtyard: a U-shaped council chamber and town hall with administrative offices, and a community library with flats. Aalto received the commission after a design contest in 1949. Completed in December 1951 the building was opened in 1952.

The town hall is considered one of the most important buildings Aalto designed in his career. In July 2026, the Säynätsalo Town Hall, together with 12 other Aalto Works, was designated by UNESCO as a World Heritage Site.

== Site ==
In 1944 Aalto was commissioned to design and implement a town plan for Säynätsalo, a small factory town founded around Johan Parviaisen Tehtaat wood-processing mills, since 1946 operated by Enso-Gutzeit (now part of Stora Enso), whose headquarters in Helsinki Aalto also designed. The town hall would be built at a later date after Aalto won a government-mandated competition for its design. His plan embedded the building into the wooded hillside of Säynätsalo creating a three-story multi-purpose building surrounding an elevated courtyard.

== Design ==
The design of the Town Hall was influenced by both Finnish vernacular architecture and the humanist Italian Renaissance. From the latter Aalto drew inspiration for the courtyard arrangement which informed the name of his original competition entry entitled "Curia" (see curia).

Essential to Aalto's design was the idea of democracy, the representation of the people and their relationship with the government which is why he included a large public space, along with further sections dedicated to the public. While the main program of the building is housed within a heavy envelope of red brick, the courtyard is bordered by a glass-enclosed circulation space which can be linked to the model of an arcade-bordered piazza.

The town hall is crowned by the council chamber, a double-height space which is capped by the Aalto-designed "butterfly" trusses. The trusses support both the roof and the ceiling, creating airflow to manage condensation in the winter and heat in the summer. The butterfly truss eliminates the need for multiple intermediate trusses. It also gives call to medieval and traditional styles. The council chamber is approached from the main entrance hall a floor below via a ramp which wraps around the main tower structure under a row of clerestory ribbon windows.

Aalto constrained his material palette to one dominated by brick and accented by timber and copper. Though Aalto practiced at the same time as Modernist architects Le Corbusier and others, he rejected the machine aesthetic for the majority of his architecture. Instead, he saw his buildings as organisms made of up of individual cells. This principle informed Aalto's use of traditional building materials such as brick which is, by nature, cellular.

The massive brick envelope is punctuated by periods of vertical striation in the form of timber columns which evoke Säynätsalo's setting in a heavily forested area. Winfried Nerdinger argues that, Aalto "avoided a too perfect mechanical appearance. To this end, he insisted that the bricks should not be laid precisely to the plane. The result is a lively, natural-looking surface that acquires a sculptural quality in the light."

Another distinctive feature at Säynätsalo are the grass stairs which complement a conventional set of stairs adjacent to the tower council chambers. Stairs also evoke notions of Ancient Greek and Roman architecture resembling an amphitheater.

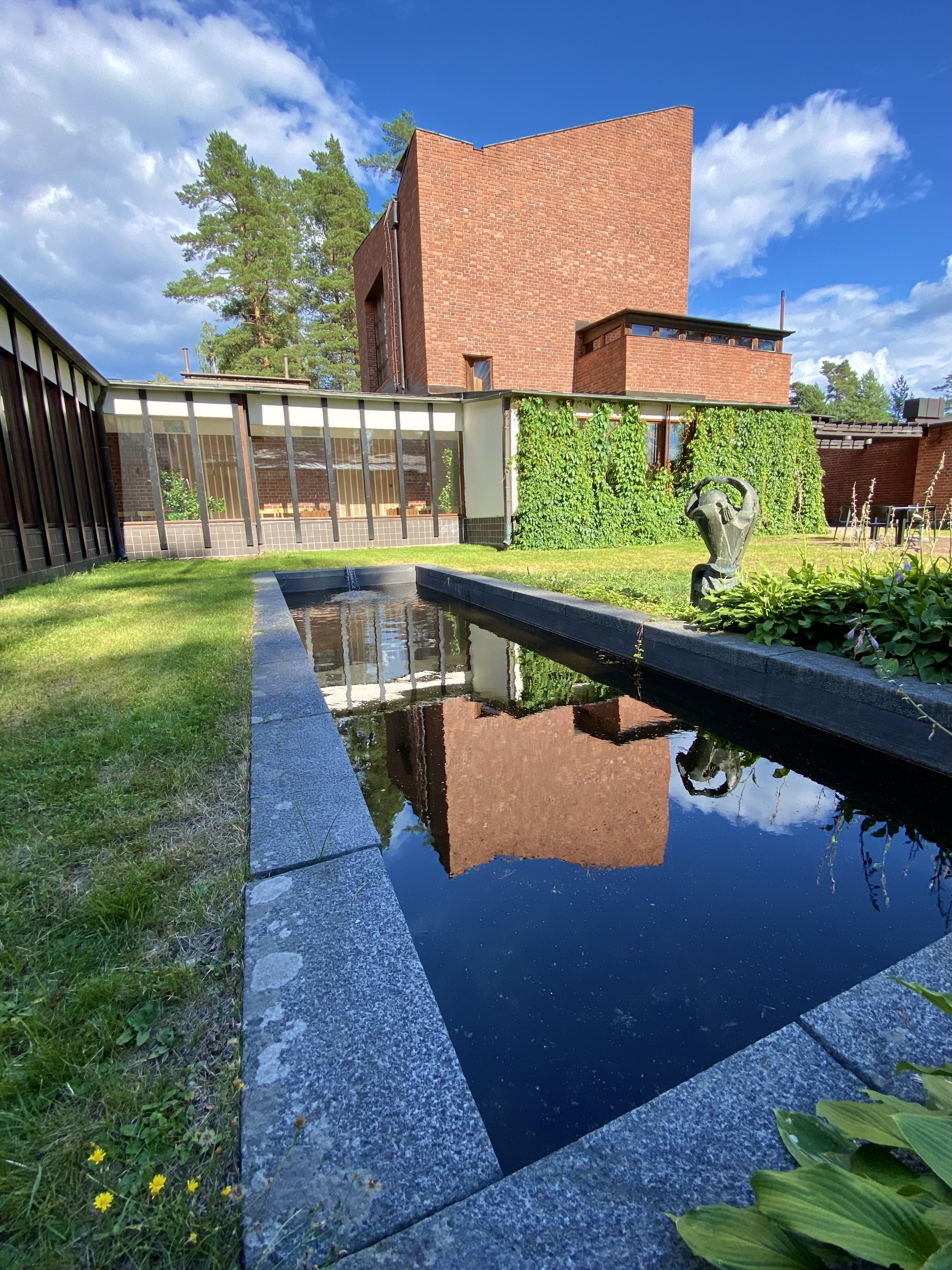
The courtyard with a fountain and a sculpture

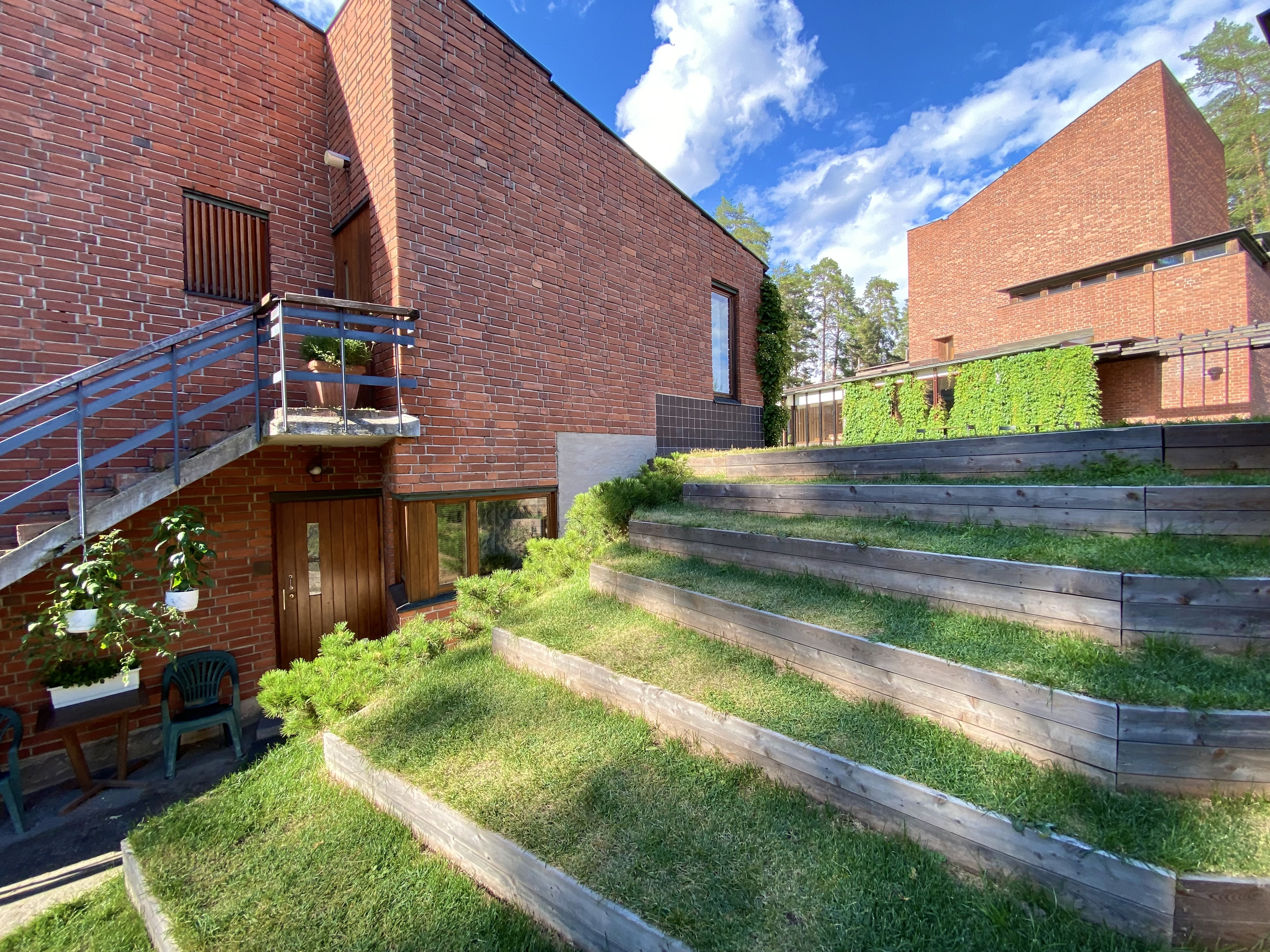
The grass stairs

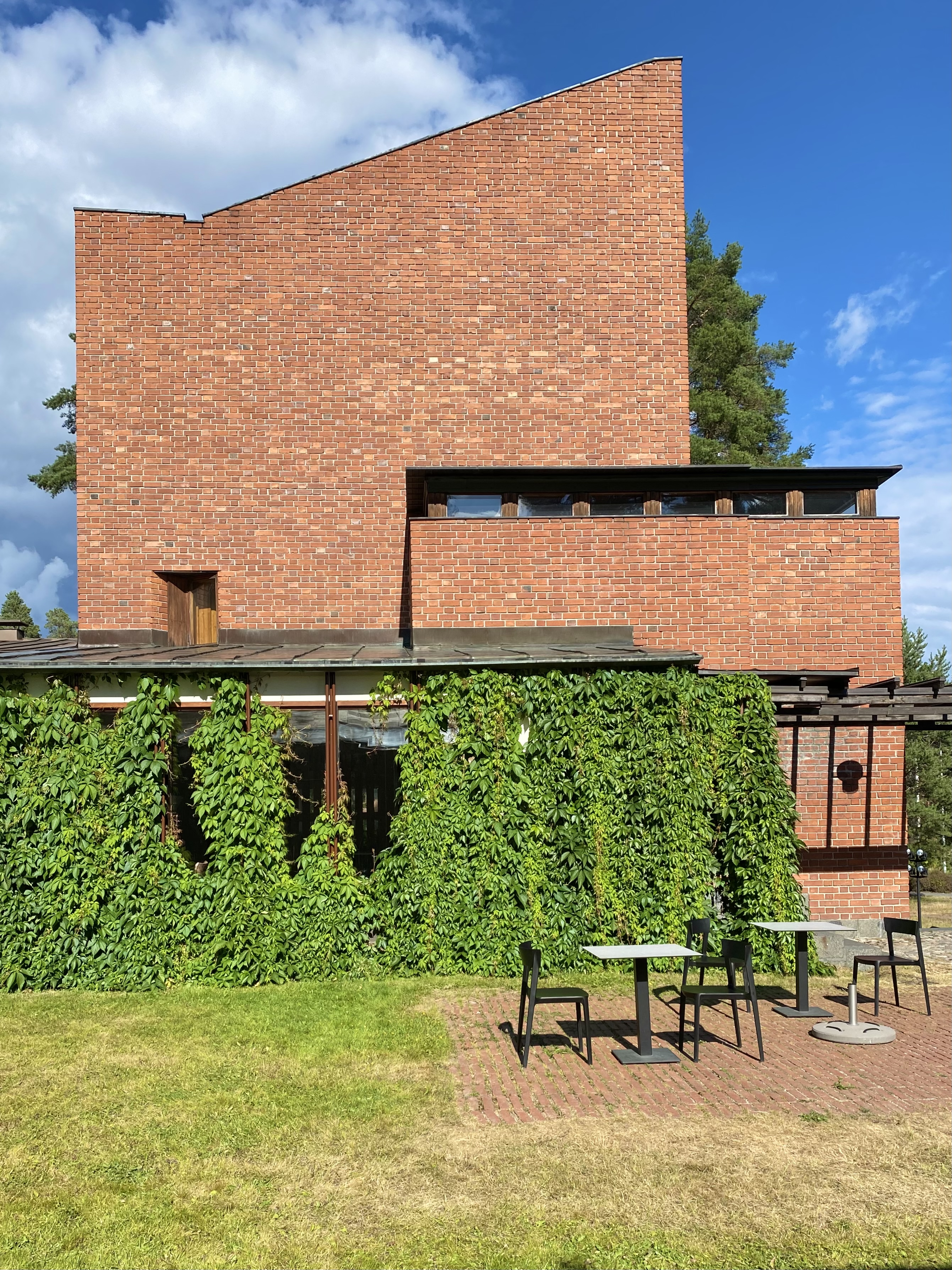
The courtyard

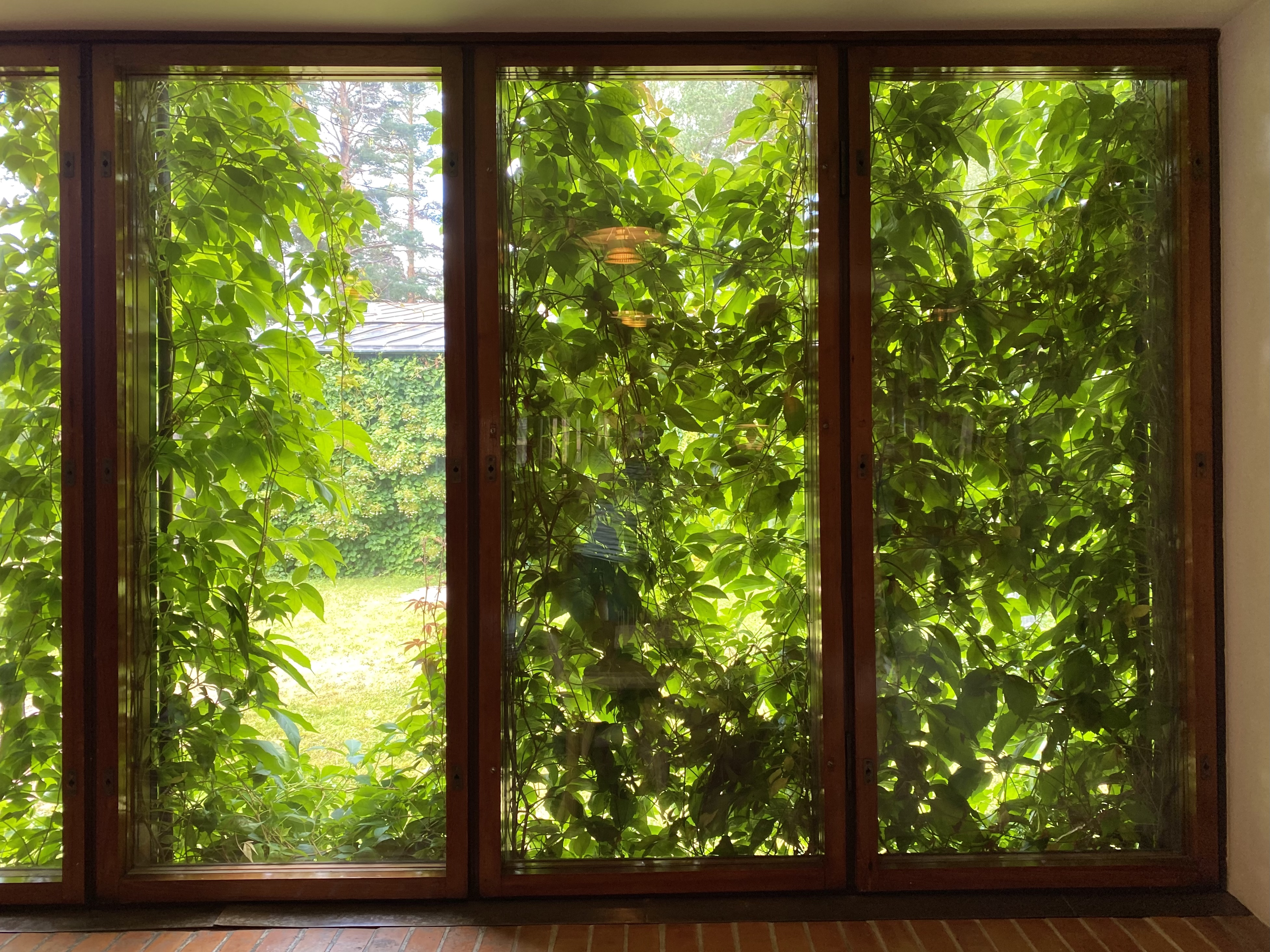
Wall of green covering window

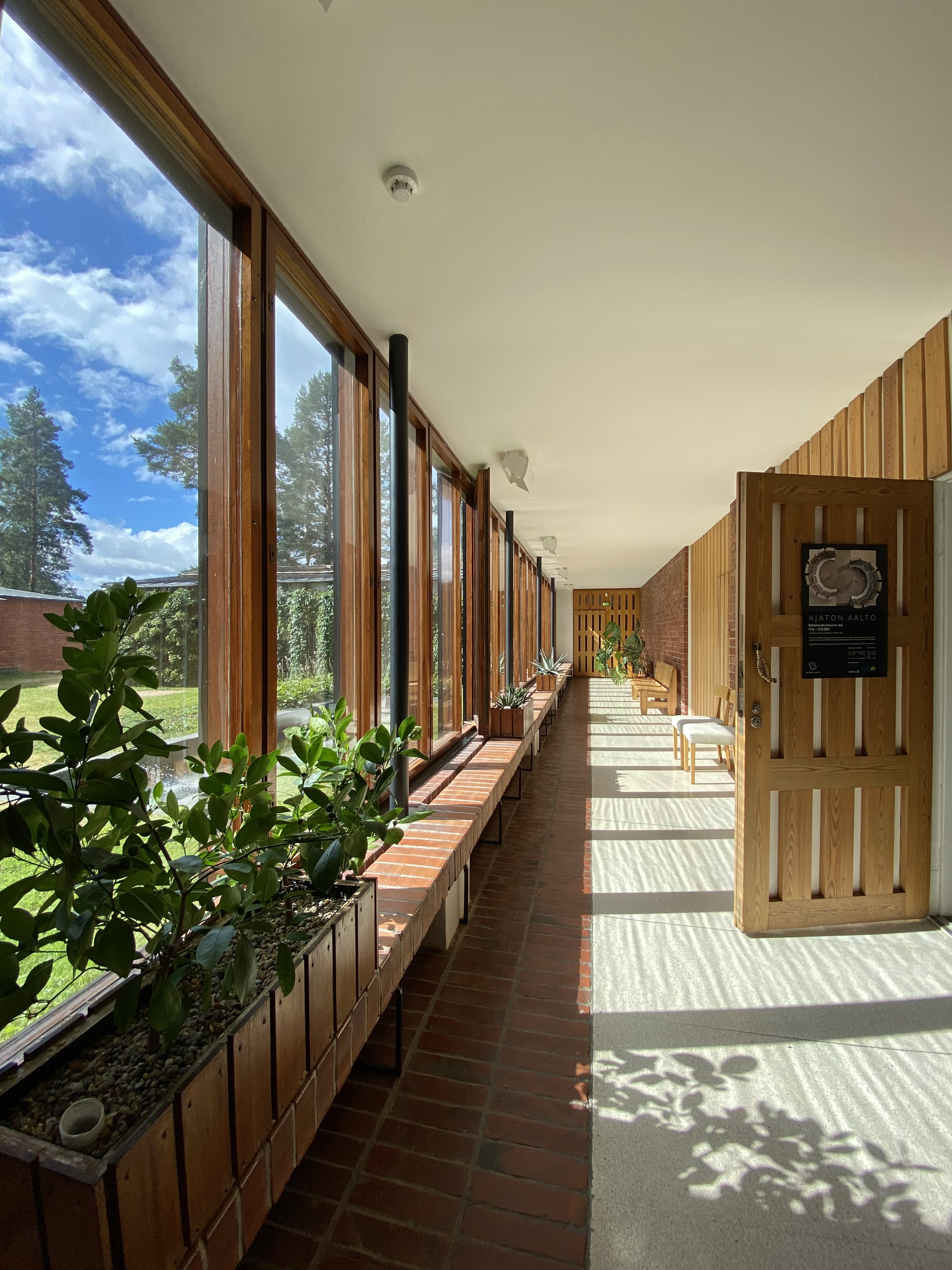
Interior

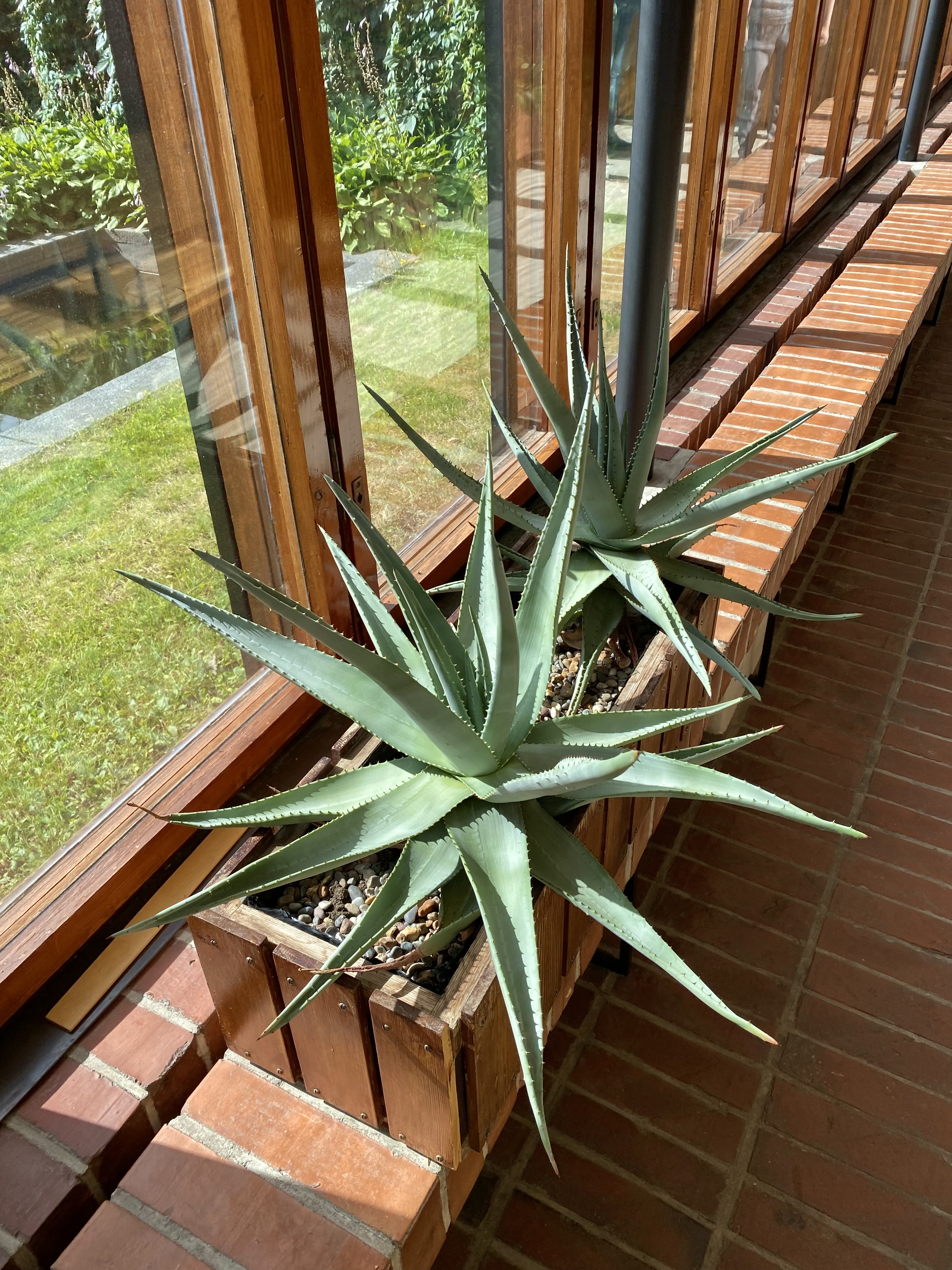
Aalto selected exact species and locations of indoor plants

== Plan ==
Originally, the building was planned as a multifunctional complex which included civic offices and meeting spaces, a library, a bank, shops and private apartments. The civic spaces are concentrated on the second floor on the west side of the building, surrounding the courtyard and leading to the council chamber. The apartment spaces occupied both the first and second stories on the east end.

Since the original construction, much of the multifunctionality has been abandoned and converted to allow for expanding office needs.
