= Museum of Central Finland =

Museum in Jyväskylä, Finland

The Museum of Central Finland
- Keski-Suomen museo
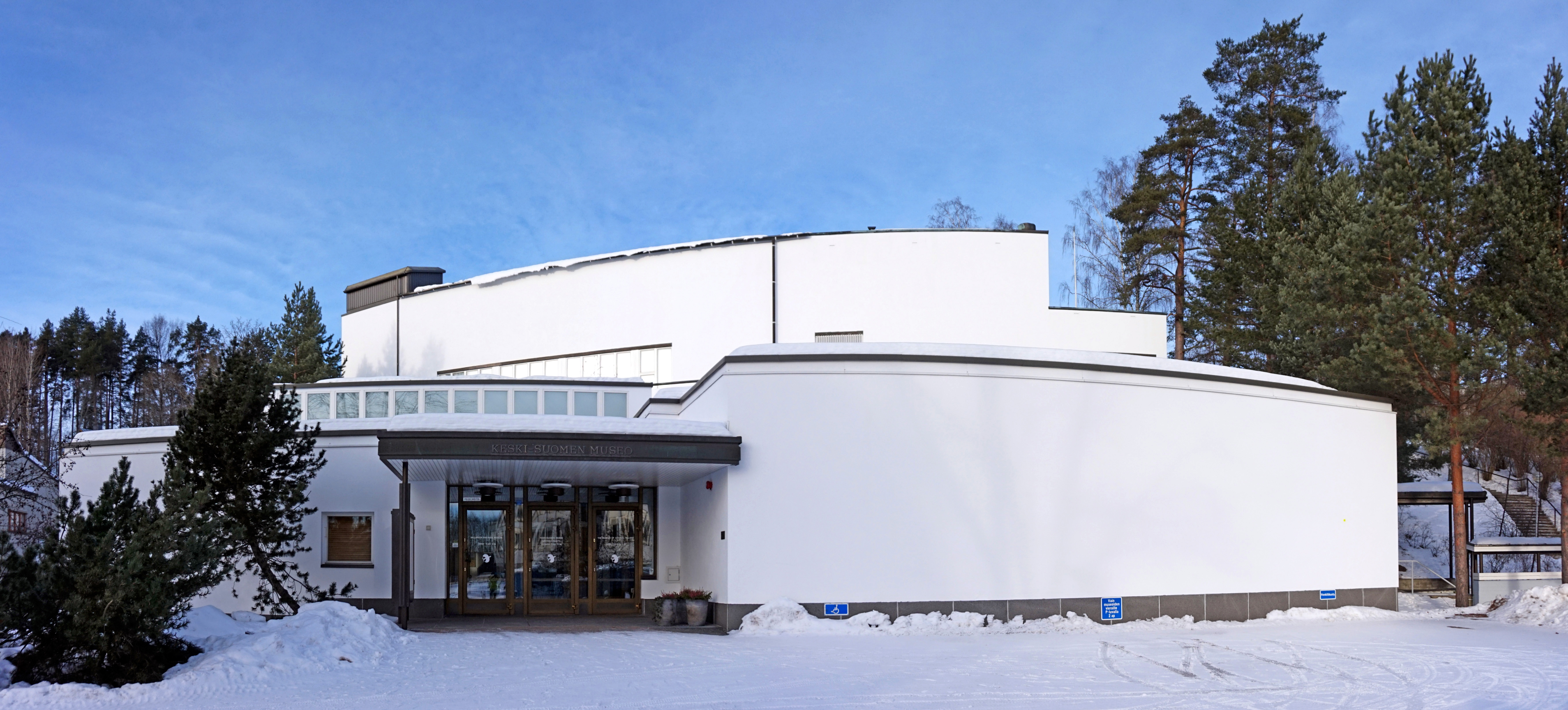
- The Museum of Central Finland, in February 2015
- Established: 1932; current building 1960
- Location: Jyväskylä, Finland
- Coordinates: 62.24°N 25.7475°E
- Visitors: c. 11,700 (2019)
- Architect: Alvar Aalto
- Owner: City of Jyväskylä
- Website: www.jyvaskyla.fi/en/museum-central-finland

The Museum of Central Finland (Finnish: Keski-Suomen museo, abbreviated as KeMu) is a museum of cultural history located in Jyväskylä, the capital of the Central Finland region. It serves as the regional museum for Central Finland, as well as the municipal museum of the City of Jyväskylä.

== Architecture ==
The present building, notable for having been designed by the Finnish architect Alvar Aalto, was completed in 1960. In 2017–2020, the museum was extensively renovated, including the addition of 80 digital information displays and numerous interactive audiovisual exhibits.

The Museum of Central Finland is located adjacent to the Alvar Aalto Museum. Plans are underway to connect the two museums with a new wing, estimated to open in late 2023.

== Statistics ==
The museum was established in 1932.

It has 1,328 square metres (14,290 sq ft) of exhibition space.

In 2019, the museum received over 11,700 visitors.
