= Säynätsalo =

- Former Municipality
- Säynätsalon kunta Säynätsalo kommun
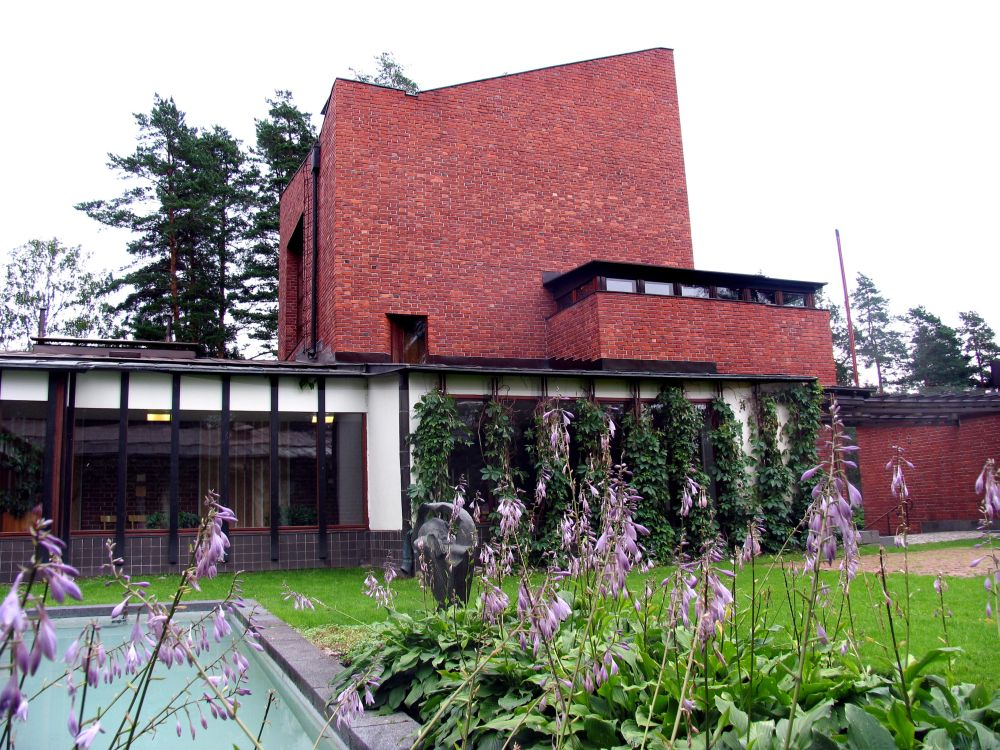
- Säynätsalo Town Hall by architect Alvar Aalto

- Coat of arms

- Location of Säynätsalo in Finland
- Coordinates: 62°08.3′N 025°46.9′E
- Country: Finland
- Region: Central Finland
- Sub-region: Jyväskylä sub-region
- Founded: 1924
- Consolidated: 1993

Area
  - Total: 9.0 km^{2} (3.5 sq mi)

Population (November 2010)
  - Total: 3,340
  - Density: 370/km^{2} (960/sq mi)
  - Metro density: 371/km^{2} (960/sq mi)
- Time zone: UTC+2 (EET)
  - Summer (DST): UTC+3 (EEST)

Säynätsalo is a former municipality in Finland and a part of Jyväskylä. As of November 2010 its population was 3,340. Säynätsalo municipality consisted of islands of Säynätsalo and Lehtisaari and also a part of Muuratsalo island. All of the islands are located on the Lake Päijänne. Also a small slice of land on the continent was part of the municipality.

Säynätsalo is famous for Säynätsalo Town Hall.

== Name ==
The name Säynätsalo originally referred to the main island, which gets its name from säynäs meaning "ide" and salo meaning "island". Another municipality named after the ide was Säyneinen in North Savo.

== History ==
The island of Säynätsalo was first mentioned in 1782 as Säynet Salo. At this time, it was an uninhabited island within the parish of Jämsä. The Korpilahti parish, including Säynätsalo, was split off from Jämsä in 1861.

The businessman Johan Parviainen bought the island in 1897 and built a sawmill there in the next year. Later in 1914, he built a plywood factory.

The municipality of Muurame split off from Korpilahti in 1921. The idea of a separate Säynätsalo municipality appeared in 1922 and the island became its own municipality in 1924. Lehtisaari and the northern part of Muuratsalo were added to it in 1935. More land on Muuratsalo was transferred from Muurame to Säynätsalo in 1960 and later in 1980.

Säynätsalo became a part of the town of Jyväskylä in 1993.

== Gallery ==
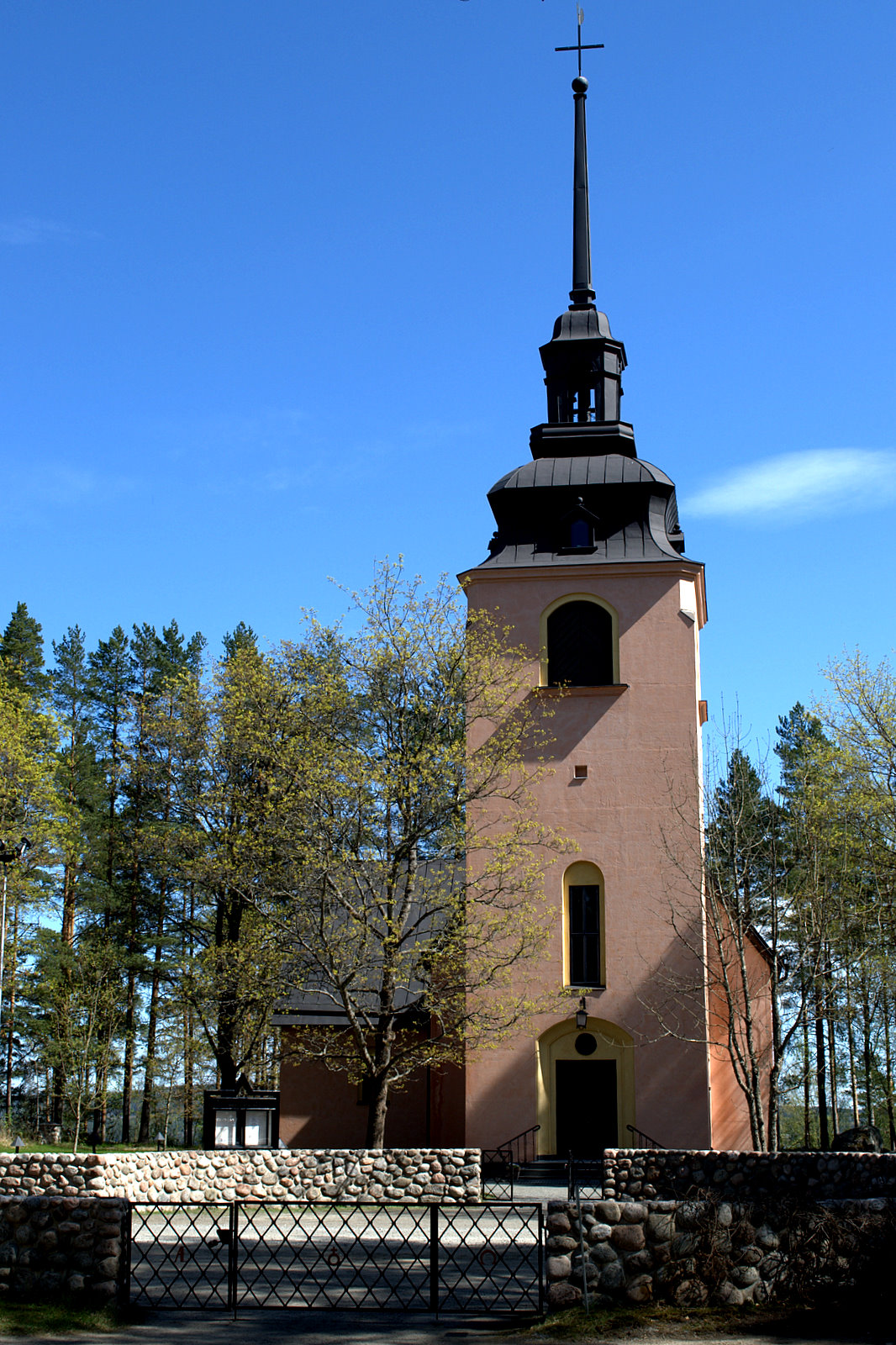
Säynätsalo Church

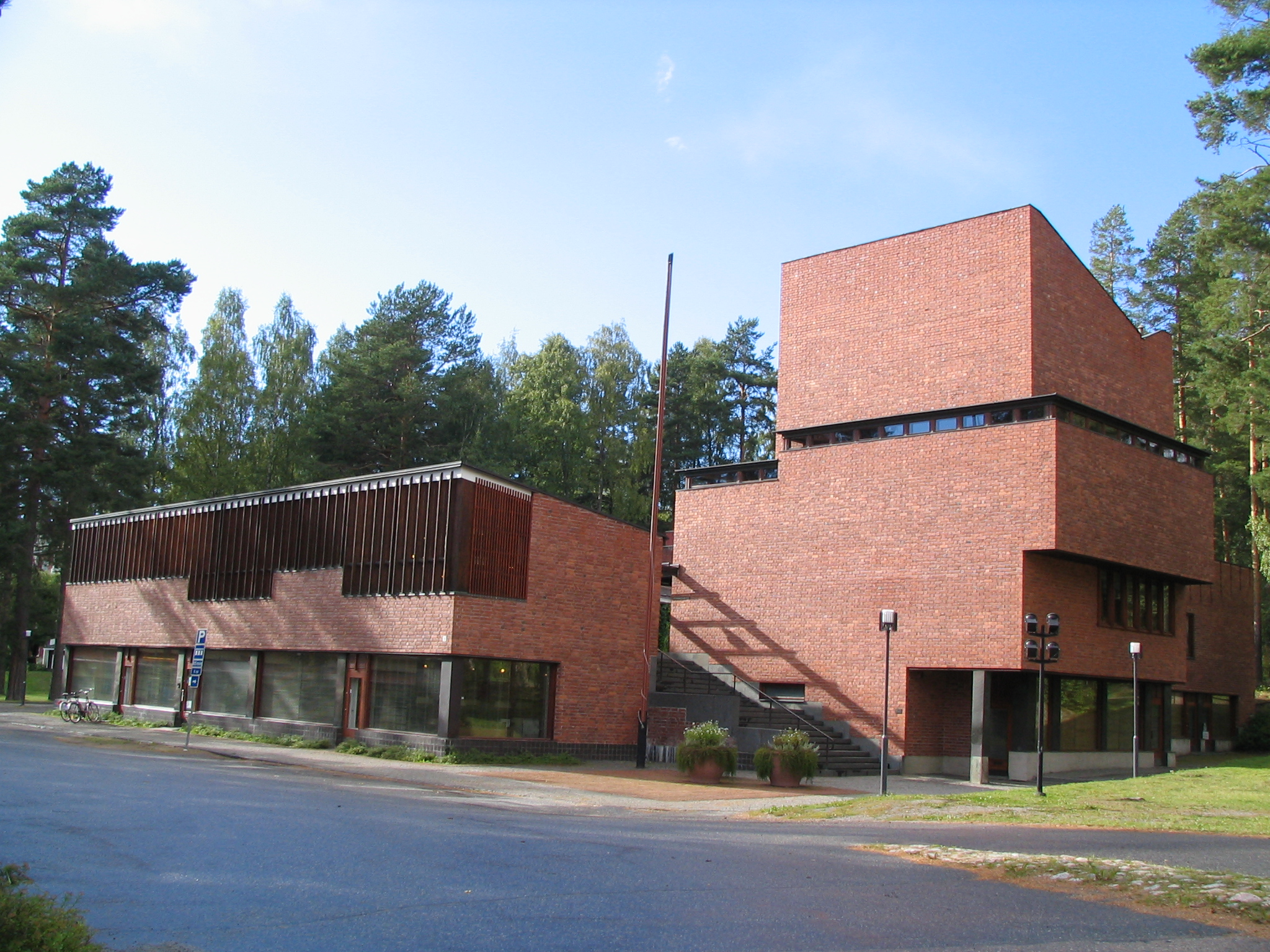
Säynätsalo Town Hall

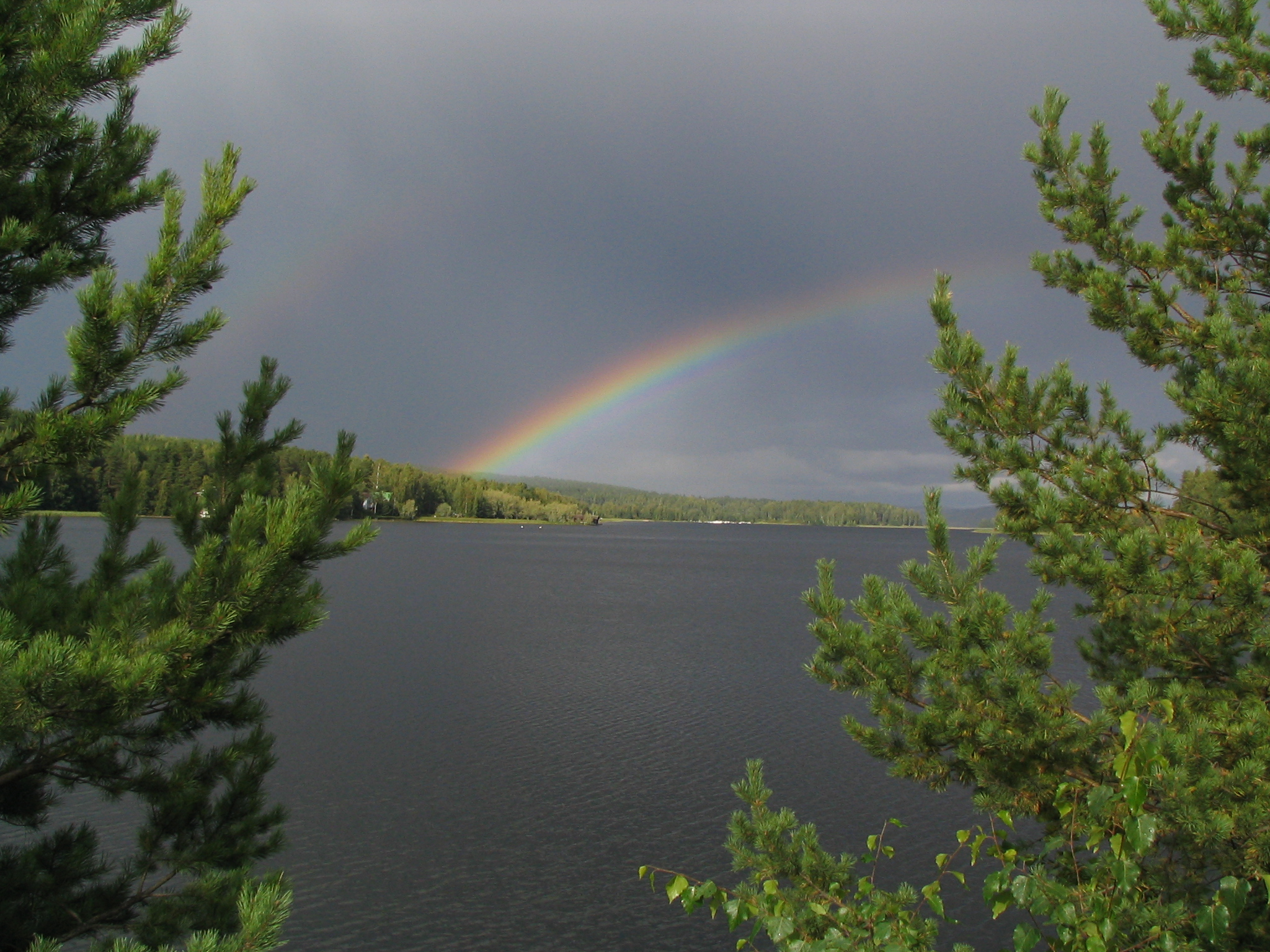
A view from Säynätsalo Bridge towards Kinkomaa

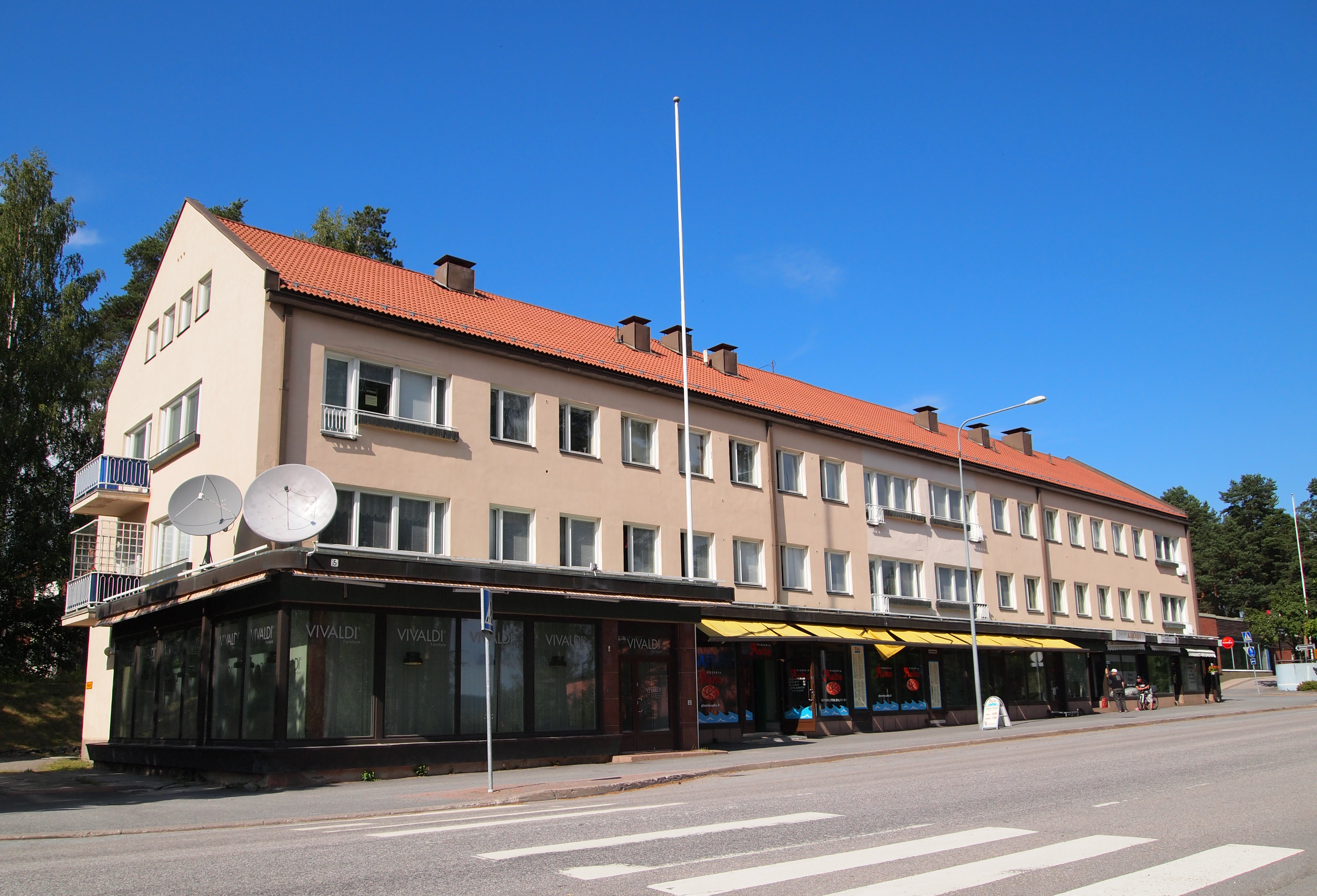
A house in Säynätsalo

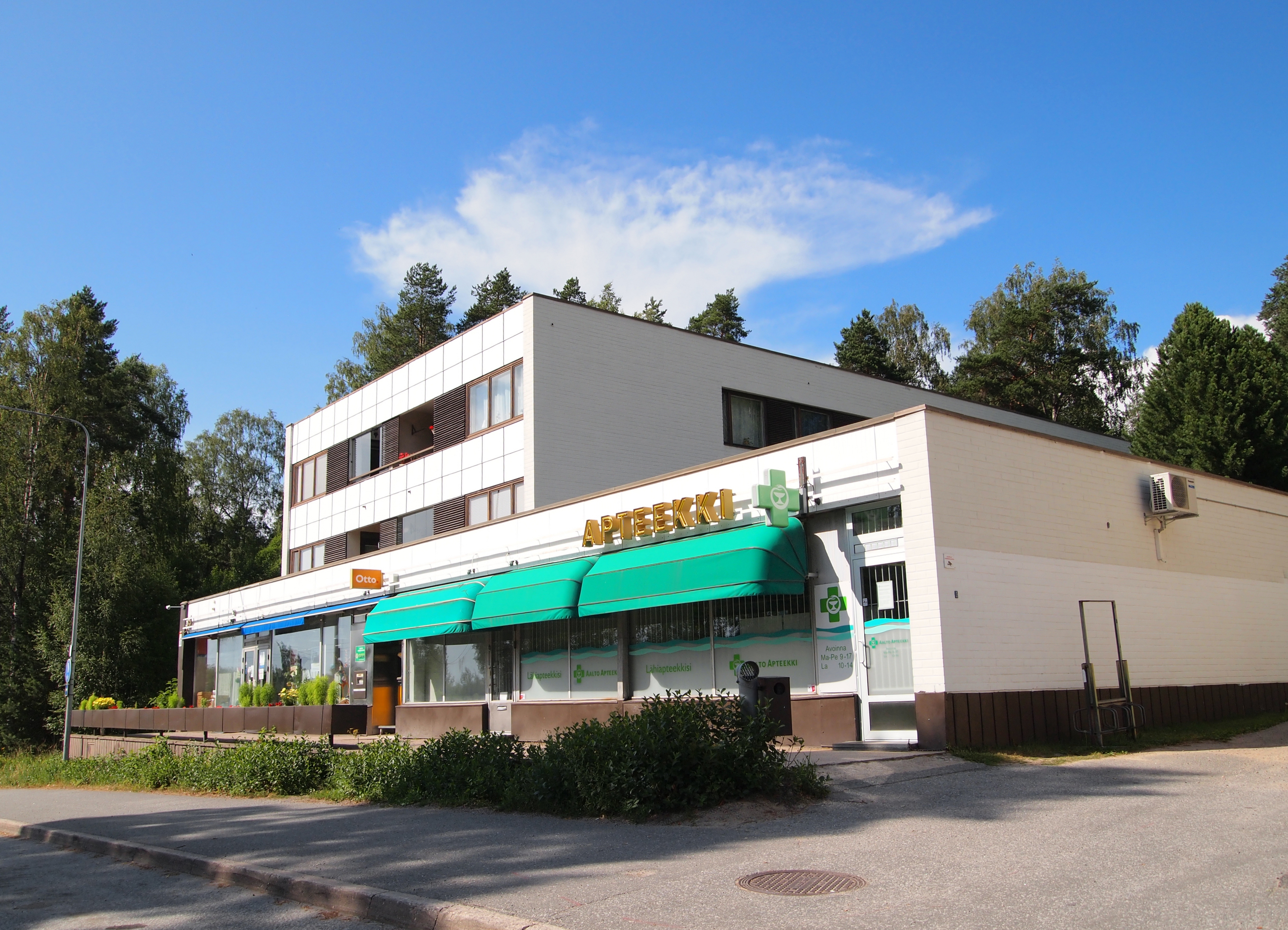
Säynätsalo Centre

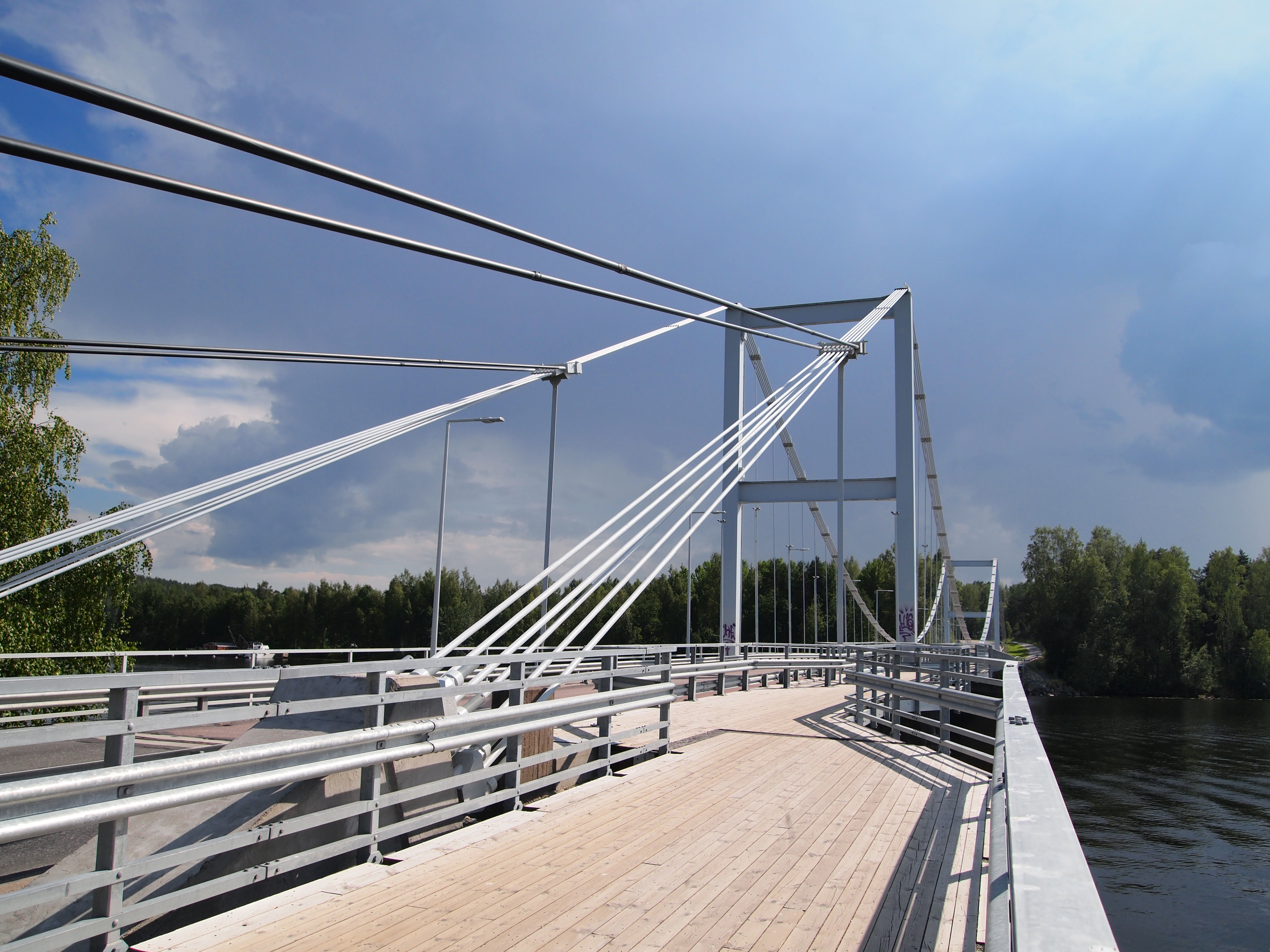
Louhunsalmi Suspension Bridge

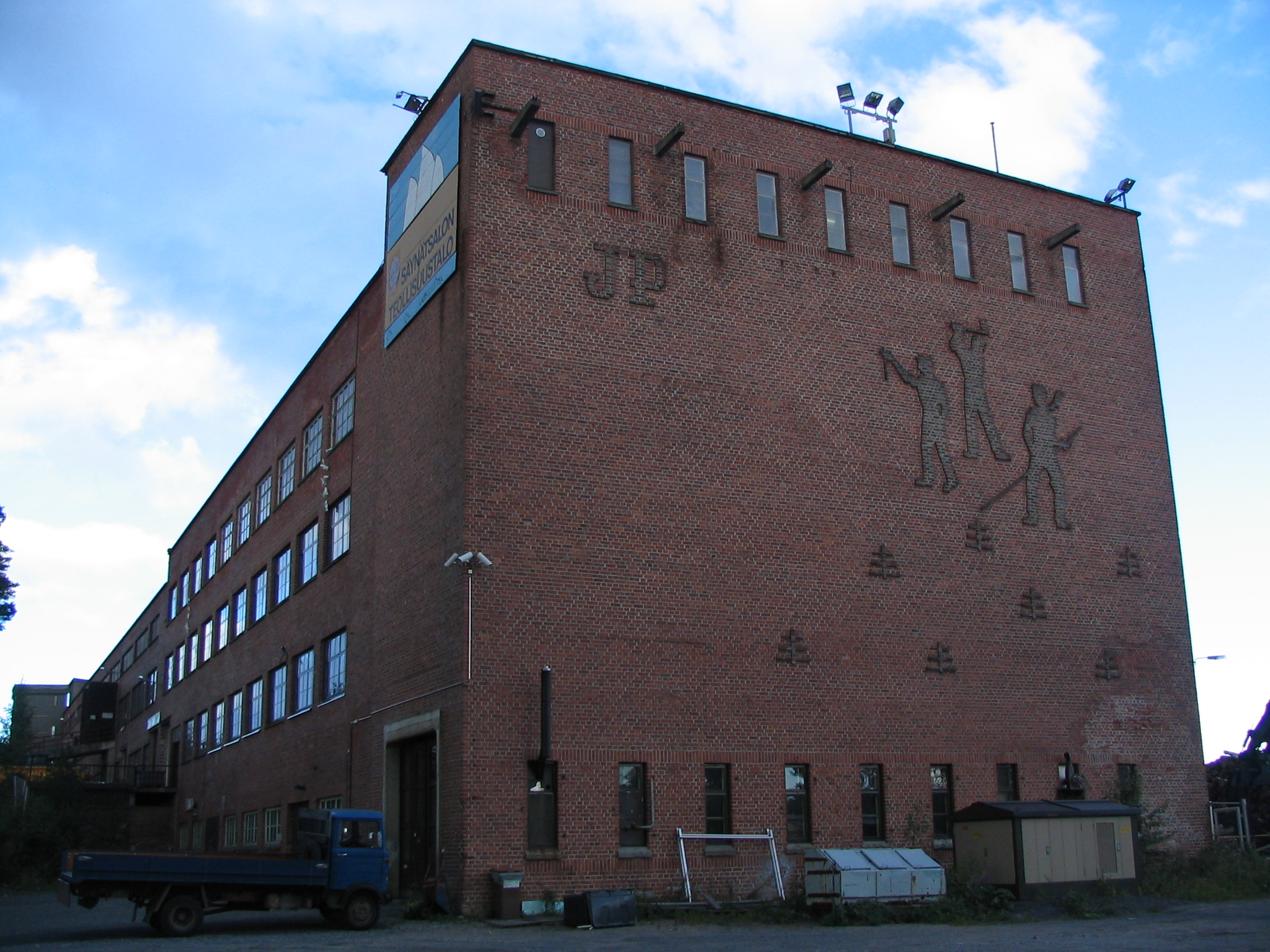
Teollisuustalo

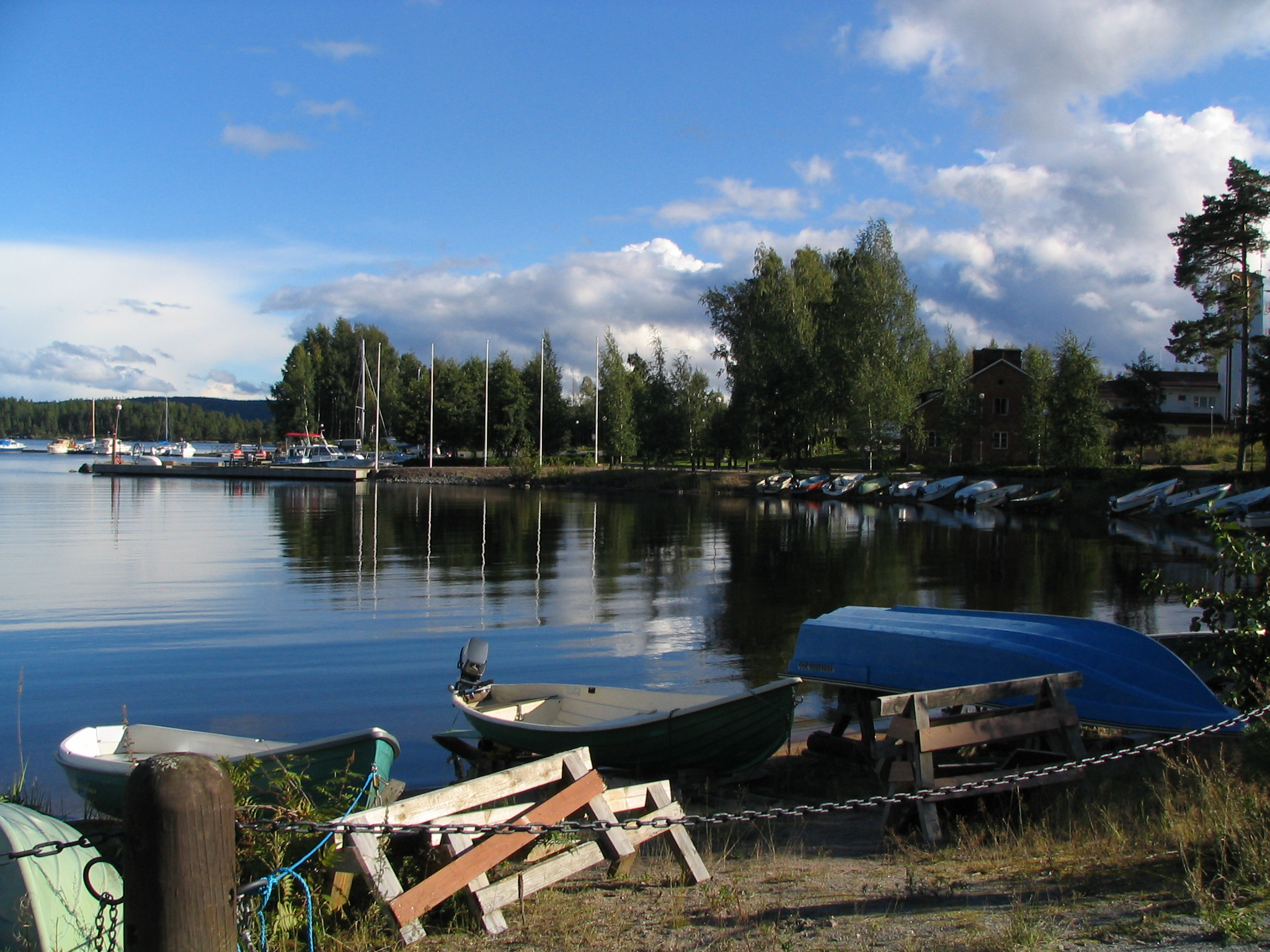
Säynätsalo harbor

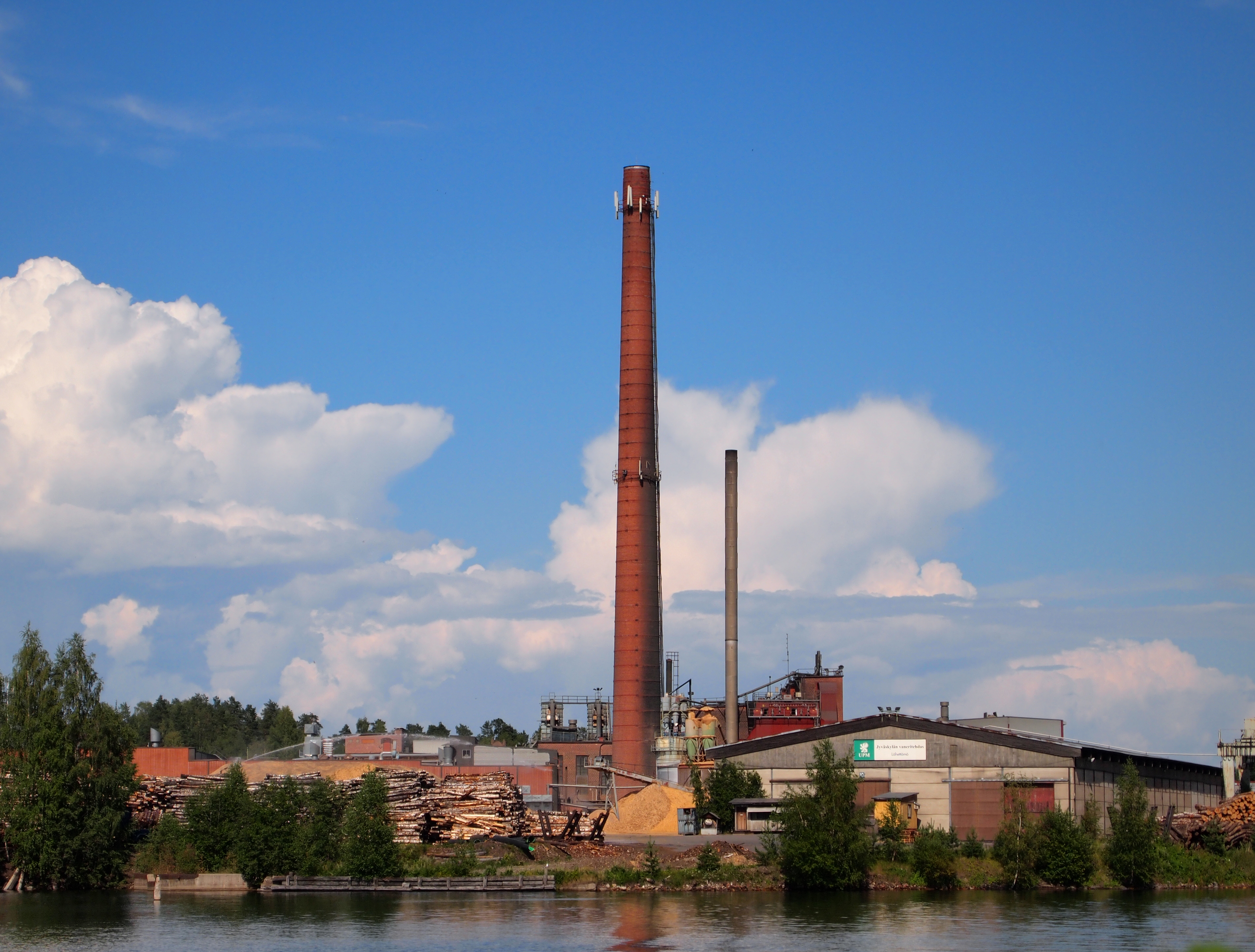
Plywood Factory
