= Korpilahti =

- Former municipality
- Korpilahden kunta
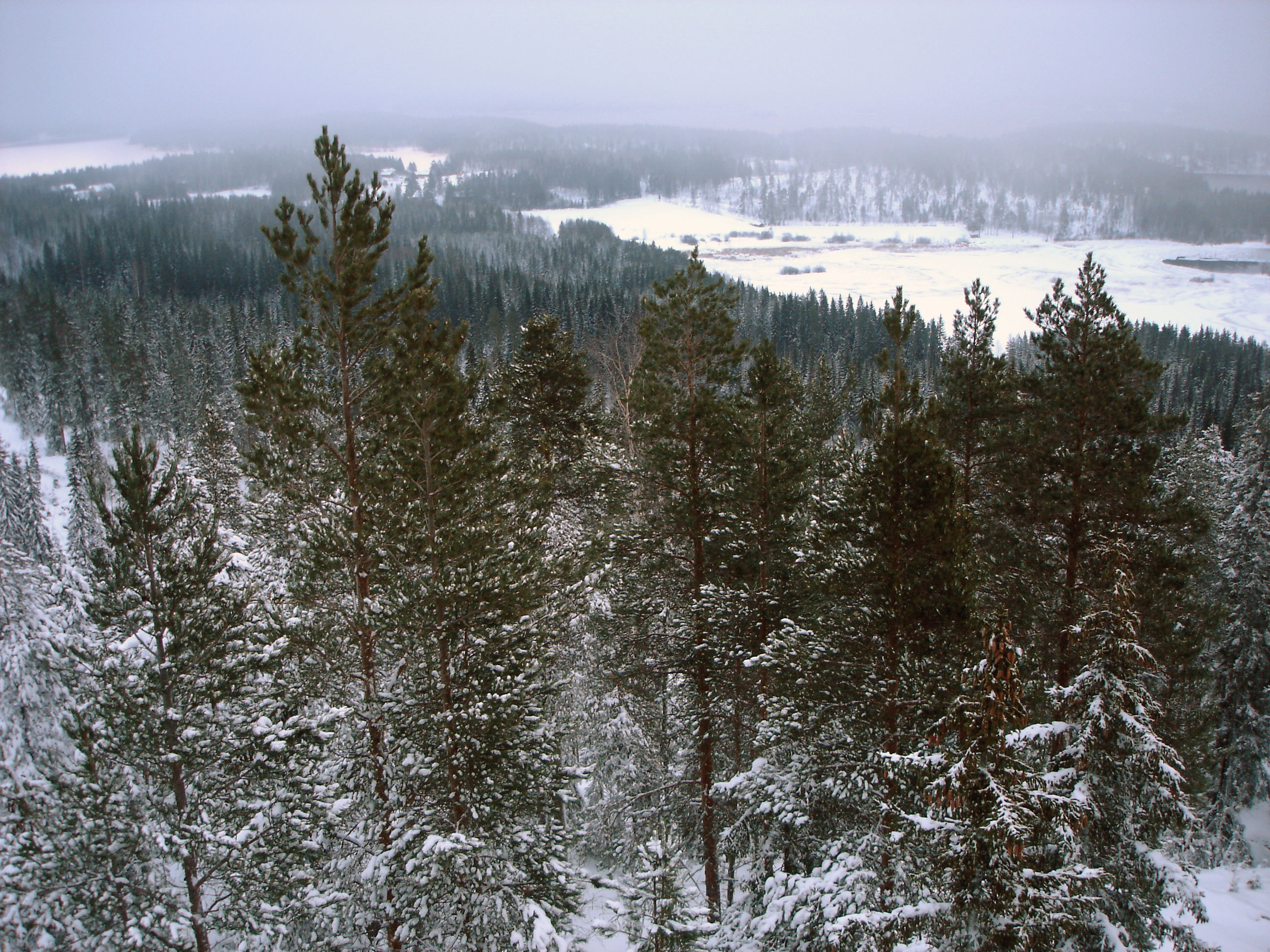
- Landscape of Korpilahti seen from the top of mount Oravivuori

- Coat of arms

- Location of Korpilahti in Finland
- Coordinates: 62°01′00″N 025°33′40″E
- Country: Finland
- Province: Western Finland Province
- Region: Central Finland
- Established: 1861
- Merged into Jyväskylä: 2009
- Seat: Korpilahden kirkonkylä

Area 794.62
  - Land: 614.58 km^{2} (237.29 sq mi)
  - Water: 177.44 km^{2} (68.51 sq mi)

Population (2008-12-31)
  - Total: 5,061
  - Density: 8.23/km^{2} (21.3/sq mi)

Korpilahti is a former municipality of Finland. Together with Jyväskylän maalaiskunta, Korpilahti was consolidated with Jyväskylä on January 1, 2009.

It is located in the former province of Western Finland and is part of the Central Finland region. There are about 4,500 summer-time inhabitants visiting the 2,000 summer cottages.

The municipality is unilingually Finnish. The municipality was also known as "Korpilax" in Swedish. The Swedish name is now considered outdated, according to the Institute for the Languages of Finland. Politically, Centre Party is dominant. Korpilahti was one of the poorest municipalities in Finland with an unemployment rate of 14.4% (2002).

Korpilahti is relatively well known for its nature, with large hills and about 200 lakes. Lake Päijänne, the second largest lake in Finland, is partially in the area of Korpilahti.

== Geography ==
=== Neighboring municipalities ===
The municipality of Korpilahti bordered Jyväskylän mlk, Muurame, Toivakka, Joutsa, Luhanka, Jämsä, Jämsänkoski and Petäjävesi. It bordered Koskenpää instead of Jämsänkoski until 1969 and Leivonmäki instead of Joutsa until 31 December 2008.

=== Villages ===
==== Register villages ====
Note that some of the actual settlements with these names may be in other municipalities, while some may not be settlement names at all.

- Honkala
- Juokslahti
- Kähö
- Korpilahti
- Moiskala
- Muurame
- Muuratjärvi
- Nuorlahti
- Oittila
- Pajulahti
- Putkilahti
- Raidanlahti
- Riihijärvi (Moksi)
- Ruotsula
- Rutalahti
- Sammallahti
- Särkijoki
- Säyrylä
- Tervala
- Veijo
- Vitikkala
- Yijälä

== History ==
Korpilahti was first mentioned in 1596 as Kårpilaxiby, when it was a part of the parish of Jämsä. It became a separate parish in 1861.

The municipality of Muurame was split off from Korpilahti in 1921, while Säynätsalo was split off from Muurame in 1924. The municipality of Korpilahti became a part of Jyväskylä in 2009.

== Vaaruvuori ==
A pumped-storage hydroelectricity plant was planned on Vaaruvuori near lake Päijänne but environmentalist opposition has killed the project.
