= Kuikka, Jyväskylä =

Kuikka
- District of Jyväskylä
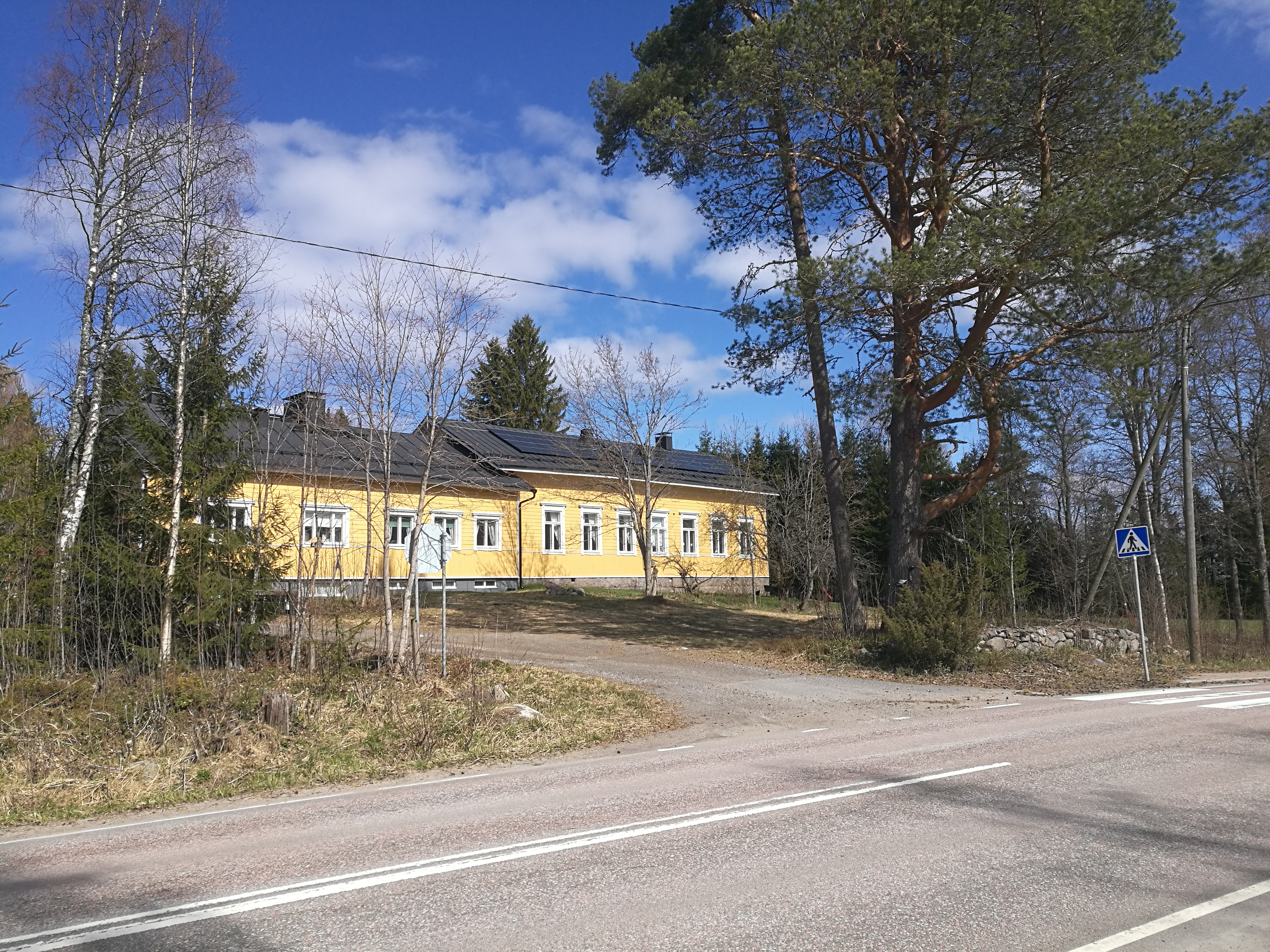
- Former school of Kuikka.

- Location in Central Finland Kuikka (Finland)
- Coordinates: 62.382°N 25.588°E
- Country: Finland
- Region: Central Finland
- Sub-region: Jyväskylä sub-region
- City: Jyväskylä

Population (2010)
  - Total: 270
- Time zone: UTC+2 (EET)
  - Summer (DST): UTC+3 (EEST)
- Postal code: 41140

Kuikka is a village and district of Jyväskylä, Finland, located in the northern part of the city between the border with Uurainen in the west and the urban area of Tikkakoski in the east. Before 2009, it was part of Jyväskylän maalaiskunta. As of December 2010, Kuikka had a population of 270.

== Geography ==
=== Location and boundaries ===
Kuikka is located in the northern part of Jyväskylä west of the urban area of Tikkakoski, with its center lying at the crossroads of the road 630 (Kuikantie) leading to Uurainen and the road 6300 (Tikkakoskentie) to Tikkakoski. The distance from the center is about 20 kilometers (12 mi) to downtown Jyväskylä, 4 kilometers (2.5 mi) to Tikkakoski and 15 kilometers (9.3 mi) to central Palokka.

Kuikka was not a land register village, but part of Korttajärvi, which also covered modern Puuppola and much of Hiekkapohja.

Kuikka is also the name of Jyväskylä's 60th official district, covering most of the village as well as the Sikomäki area to its west between Kuikka and Nyrölä. The district borders Tikkakoski in the north, Tikka-Mannila in the east, Puuppola in the southeast, Vertaala in the south, Nyrölä in the west and Uurainen in the northwest. The biggest lake in the district is Heinonen, located southeast of the village's center.

=== Nature ===
Most forests in Kuikka are extensively managed and most peatlands have been ditched. Notable animals found in the area include Siberian flying squirrels, Eurasian wrynecks and boreal owls.

The Natura 2000 site of Syväojanmäki is located in Kuikka, covering an area of 18.6 hectares (46 acres). The site consists of two sections: an upper section comprising old spruce-dominated forest with a natural spring, and a lower section comprising wetlands around the Riuttalampi pond and its outlet. The wetland around the pond is mainly open bog, while that around its outlet is coniferous swamp. Various uncommon mosses are found in the area, including Scorpidium revolvens, Paludella squarrosa and Sphagnum warnstorfii.

== History ==
The area of Korttajärvi was uninhabited until about 1566, when Pekka Puupponen, likely from Hauho, established the Puuppola farm on the shore of lake Korttajärvi. In 1589, Pekka's son Eerik Puupponen established a new farm on the northern shore of lake Heinonen. The farm was held by the Puupponen family until the 1640s, when it was abandoned and resettled by the Savonian Kuikka family, whose surname (lit. 'loon/diver') became the name of the farm. The Kuikka family no longer held the farm after the late 1660s, but the name remained in use. The farm was divided into two for the first time in 1740.

More farms were established over time, and the modern center of Kuikka mainly developed around the Pellonpää, Pirttimäki, Ränssi and Sipilä farms. Ränssi is a former rural inn (kestikievari) whose main building dates to the 1820s. The village center has been designated as a regionally important built cultural environment.

Kuikka became part of the city of Jyväskylä after the municipality of Jyväskylän maalaiskunta was consolidated with it in 2009.

== Economy and services ==
Most residents of Kuikka work in other parts of Jyväskylä or in Uurainen. Agriculture is no longer widely practiced; as of 2016, there was only one commercial farm in the village.

Services in Kuikka include the dance hall Kuikan lava, as well as Ränssin kievari at the old Ränssi farm, which functions as a summer theater and a venue for other events. Former services include a school, whose main building has been repurposed into a village hall. Other services are found mainly in Tikkakoski.

The Kuikka school was established in 1904 under the kansakoulu system, initially only comprising its upper grades until 1936, when education for the lower grades began. The school building was expanded in 1954. The municipality of Jyväskylän maalaiskunta adopted the modern peruskoulu system in 1973, and the Kuikka school remained in operation until 2004, when its students were transferred to the Luonetjärvi (in Tikkakoski) and Nyrölä schools.
