= Lehesjärvi–Vähäjärvi =

Lake in Jyväskylä

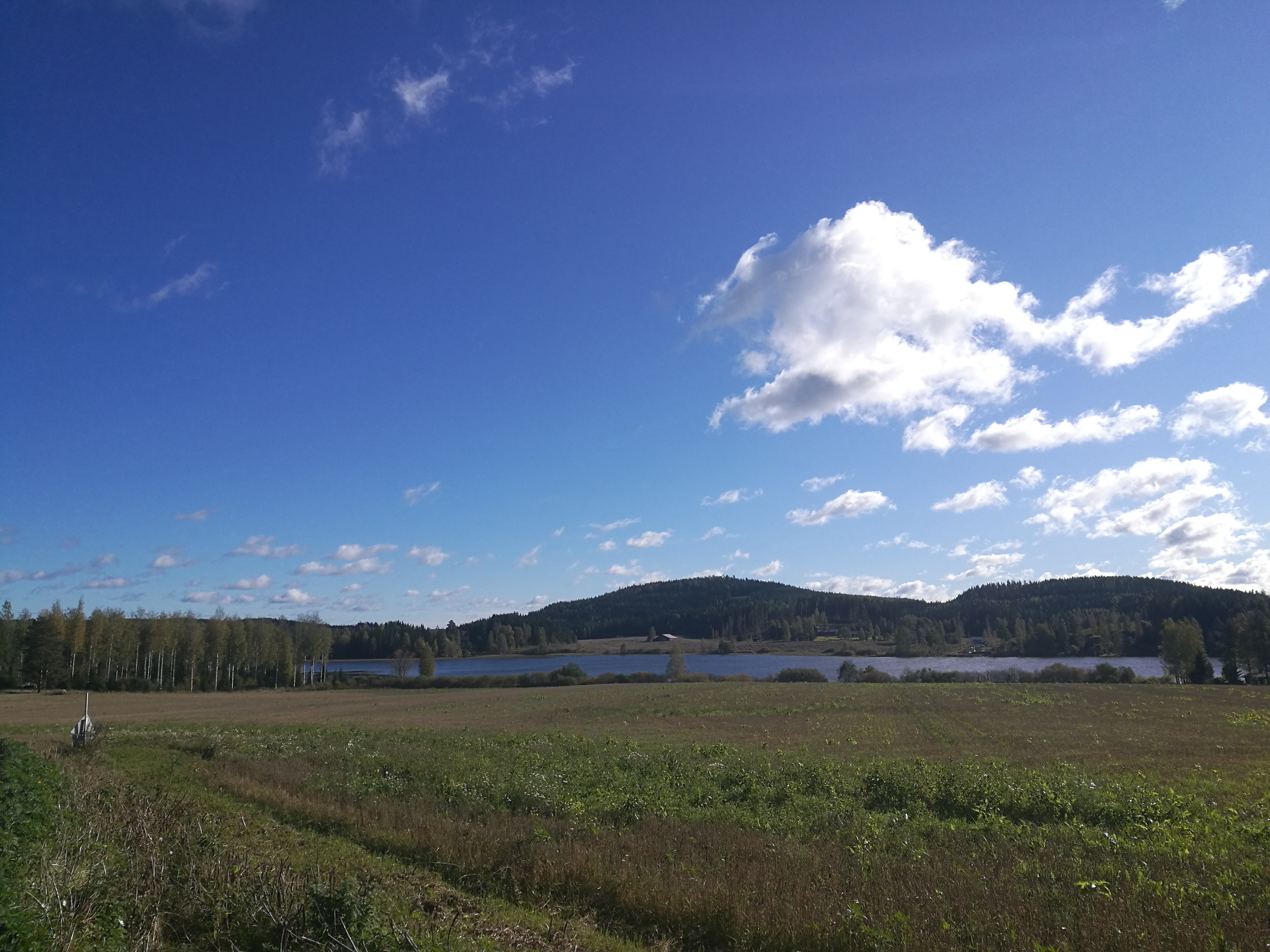
- Lehesjärvi seen from the north, with Lehesvuori (left) and Punavuori in the background
- Interactive map of Lehesjärvi–Vähäjärvi
- Location: Jyväskylä
- Coordinates: 62.350°N 25.741°E
- Primary inflows: Tervajoki, Lapiojoki, Majapuro
- Primary outflows: Makkarajoki
- Catchment area: 99.56 km^{2} (38.44 sq mi)
- Basin countries: Finland
- Surface area: 86.036 ha (212.60 acres)
- Average depth: 3.24 m (10.6 ft)
- Max. depth: 10 m (33 ft)
- Water volume: 2,783,710 cubic meters (3,640,960 cu yd)
- Residence time: 31 days
- Shore length^{1}: 8.032 km (4.991 mi)
- Surface elevation: 95.6 m (314 ft)
- ^{1} Shore length is not a well-defined measure.

Lehesjärvi–Vähäjärvi is a lake in Jyväskylä, Finland, located in the eastern part of the village of Puuppola. It consists of two basins, named Lehesjärvi and Vähäjärvi, and covers an area of 86 hectares (210 acres). The lake flows into Korttajärvi via the river Makkarajoki.

== Geography ==
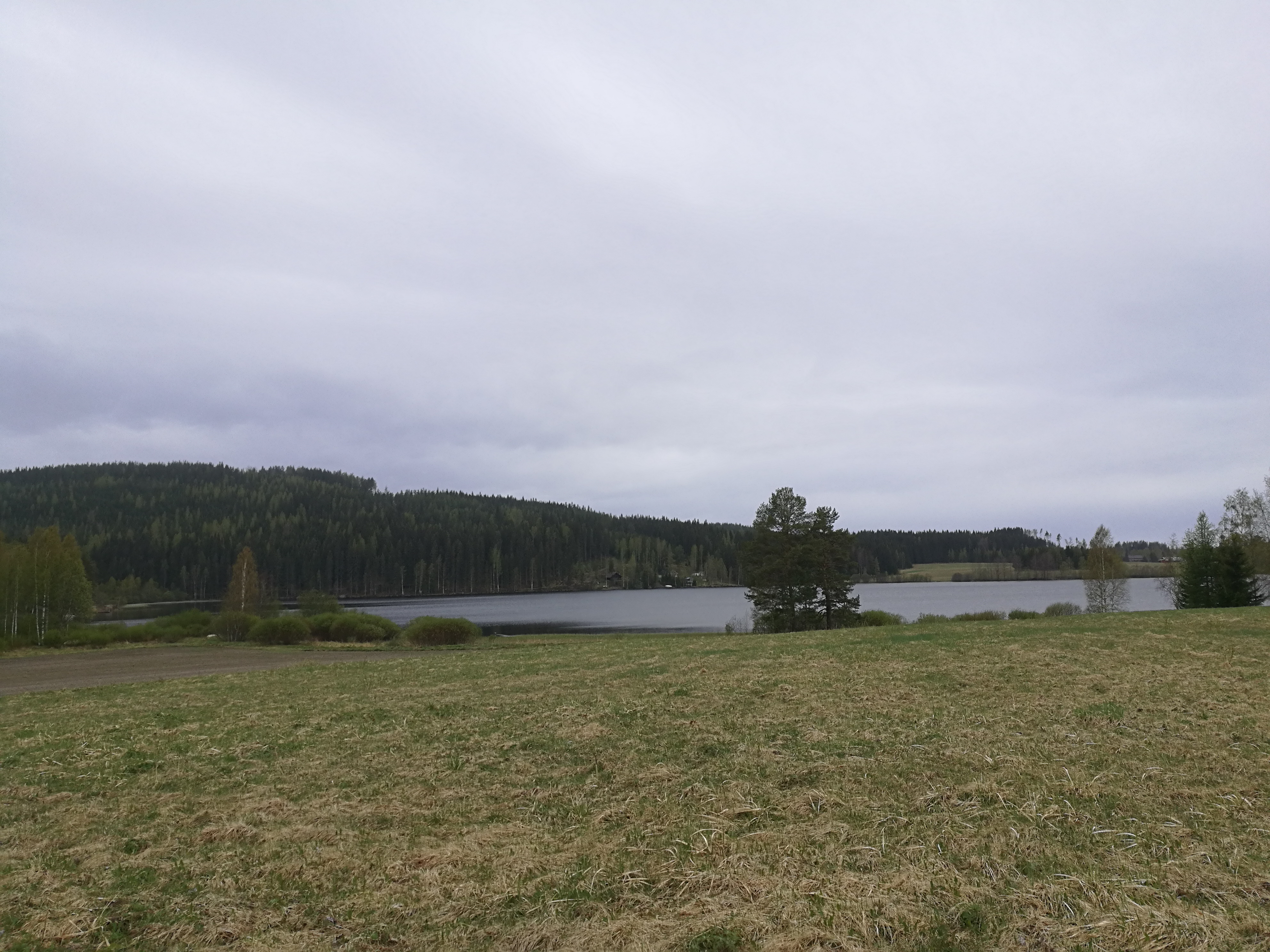
Vähäjärvi and Lehesvuori

Lehesjärvi–Vähäjärvi has an area of 86.036 hectares (212.60 acres) and a volume of 2.78 million cubic meters (3,640,000 cu yd). It consists of two basins, Lehesjärvi in the west and Vähäjärvi in the east, which are connected by a strait. The lake's surroundings are mostly farmland; the most densely populated area by it is Matinmäki to the southwest, between Lehesjärvi and Alvajärvi. The lake is separated from the center of Puuppola by the Finnish national road 4 to its west. Its average depth is 3.24 meters (10.6 ft), while the maximum depth is 10 meters (33 ft). The deepest point is found in the center of Vähäjärvi.

The lake and its surroundings are part of a nationally valuable landscape area named Kuukanpää, a lakeside agricultural environment surrounded by forested hills. Most fields in the area were cleared in the early 20th century. It includes two prominent hills named Lehesvuori and Punavuori, reaching an elevation of about 215 meters (705 ft) and 175 meters (574 ft) above sea level, respectively. The latter has a prominent cliff, providing an unobstructed view of the surroundings. Punavuori is also classified as a nationally valuable outcrop.

Lehesjärvi–Vähäjärvi has a catchment area of 99.56 square kilometers (38.44 sq mi). The inflow with the largest drainage basin is the Tervajoki (Kuokanjoki, Isojoki), which begins from lake Alanen in Vehniä and flows into Lehesjärvi, draining an area of 61 km^{2} (24 sq mi). Two streams flow into Vähäjärvi: Lapiojoki beginning from Iso-Kuukkanen and draining an area of 20 km^{2} (7.7 sq mi), and Majapuro beginning from Majajärvi and draining an area of 11.4 km^{2} (4.4 sq mi). The lake's own outflow is the 1-kilometer (0.62 mi) long Makkarajoki, which begins from the western part of Lehesjärvi, is crossed by the national road 4, and flows into Korttajärvi. The surface elevation of Lehesjärvi–Vähäjärvi is 95.6 m (314 ft) above sea level, while that of Korttajärvi is 94.9 m (311 ft), giving Makkarajoki a total drop of only 0.7 meters (2.3 ft). The lake retention time of Lehesjärvi–Vähäjärvi is 31 days.

== Environmental values ==
=== Water quality ===
The nutrient and chlorophyll levels of Lehesjärvi–Vähäjärvi have been monitored since 1976. In 2007, the water of the lake was determined to have a total nitrogen content of 800 μg/l, a total phosphorus content of 44 μg/l, and a chlorophyll content of 31.3 μg/l. Agricultural runoff is the main source of nutrient loading in the lake and the entire Makkarajoki basin. The ecological status of Lehesjärvi–Vähäjärvi, using WFD criteria, is classified as poor due to eutrophication. The average mercury content of perch (a predatory fish) in the lake, based on 25 specimens, is 0.31 mg/kg (5.0×10^{−6} oz/lb), exceeding the quality standard maximum of 0.22 mg/kg (3.5×10^{−6} oz/lb).

=== Fishing ===
Based on fish surveys done in 2007, 2010 and 2013 using nets, fish found in the lake include perch, ruffe, zander, pike, bleak, roach, common rudd, white bream, common bream and hybrid bream-roach (Abramis brama × Rutilus rutilus). Small numbers of European crayfish might also be found. A total of 3,000 zander were stocked into the lake by the local fishing cooperative between 2014 and 2015.

=== Recreation ===
Both the lake and its outflow Makkarajoki are suitable for paddling, and the strait between Lehesjärvi and Vähäjärvi has been dredged for that purpose. However, a weir in the strait blocks access between the two during low water.
