= Haapaniemi, Jyväskylä =

Haapaniemi
- District of Jyväskylä
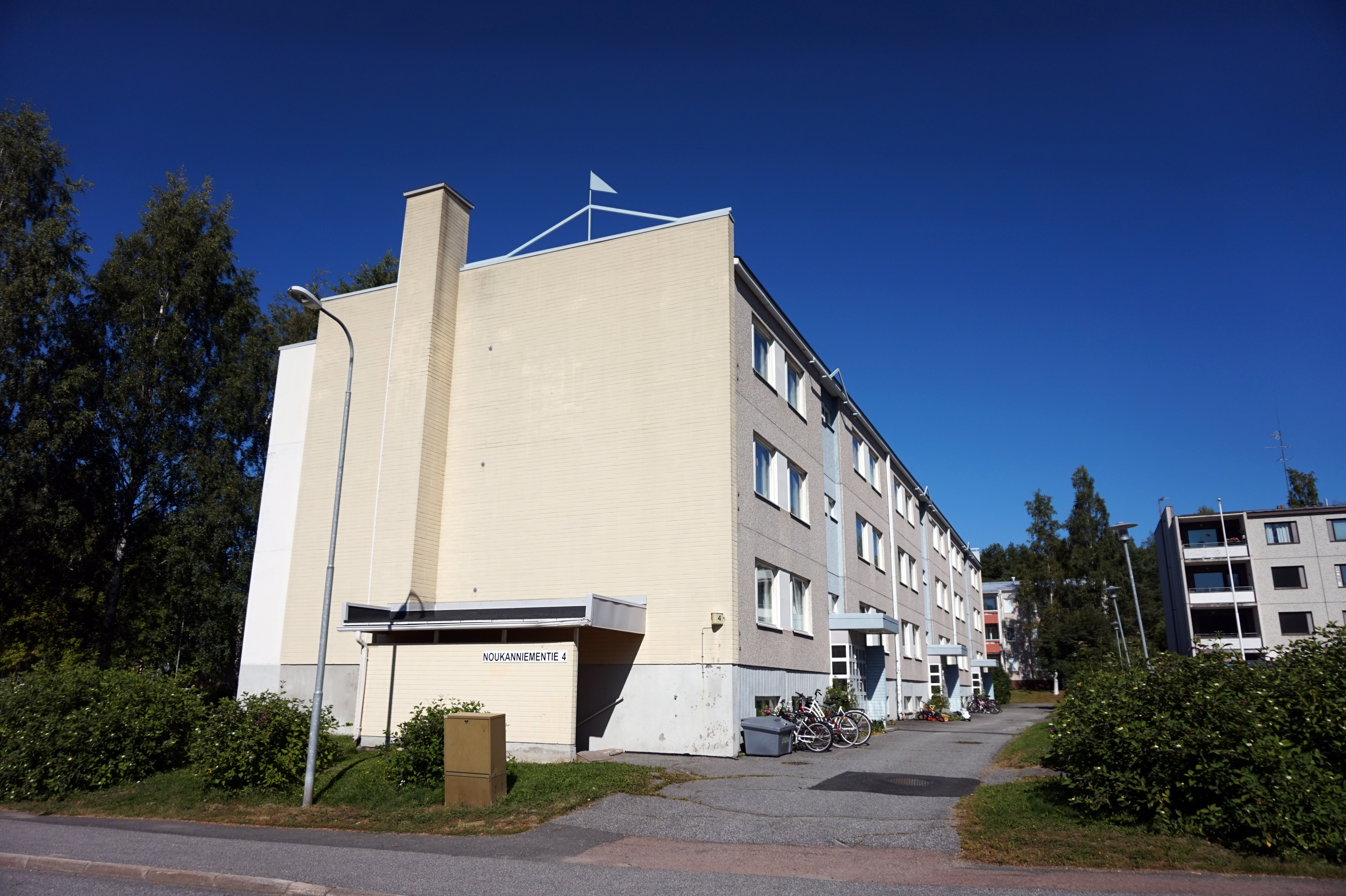
- Apartments on the Noukanniementie

- Location in Central Finland
- Coordinates: 62.2289802°N 25.8569584°E
- Country: Finland
- Region: Central Finland
- Sub-region: Jyväskylä sub-region
- City: Jyväskylä
- Ward: Vaajakoski-Jyskä

Population (2021-12-31)
  - Total: 1,372
  - without Sammallahti: 1,029
- Time zone: UTC+2 (EET)
  - Summer (DST): UTC+3 (EEST)

Haapaniemi is a district of Jyväskylä in Central Finland, located to the south of Vaajakoski. Before 2009, it was a part of Jyväskylän maalaiskunta and was one of its register villages. The distance to central Jyväskylä is roughly 6 km.

== Geography ==
The name of Haapaniemi refers to its location on a peninsula (Finnish: niemi) surrounded by the lake Päijänne. The bay to its west is known as Haapalahti.

The district of Haapaniemi also includes the Sammallahti/Varaslahti area, which is defined as a separate statistical area. Islands within the district include Iso Haapasaari, Pikku Haapasaari and Varassaari.

The register village of Haapaniemi also included central Vaajakoski in the north as well as the island of Vuoritsalo in the south. In the north, it extended to the border with Laukaa, however the area of Kaunisharju was part of the village of Leppävesi.

=== Roads ===
The main road of Haapaniemi is called Haapaniementie, a branch of the national road 4.

== History ==
During the Middle Ages, the territories of modern Haapaniemi and nearby Oravasaari were hunting grounds of Hauho. In the 15th century, Haapaniemi was property of the Hyvikkälä manor in Hauho. The farm of Haapaniemi was established around 1564 as a leased estate (Finnish: lampuotitila) for Heikki Matinpoika, who paid taxes to the vicarage of Jämsä. By 1570, a new leaseholder had been assigned to the farm: Olavi Rajalainen from Tavinsalmi (modern Kuopio). The Haapaniemi farm was the only estate on the peninsula until 1606, when the Oksala farm was separated from it.

Like the other villages of the area, it was a part of either the Jämsä parish or the Rautalampi parish and its chapel community of Laukaa. Laukaa became a separate parish in 1628 and the transfer of Jyväskylä and other nearby villages started and was finalized in 1646. Jyväskylä later became a chapel community under Laukaa in 1693.

The Oksala farm was divided into two parts in 1771. The Haapaniemi farm was divided twice in the 19th century; the Haapalahti farm was established around 1805, followed by Pellonpää in 1848. The newer Oksala farm was located near the Haapakoski rapids. It was sold in 1819 when a sawmill was established by the rapids.

The chapel community of Jyväskylä, including Haapaniemi, became a separate parish in 1856 and Jyväskylän maalaiskunta was established in 1868.

The area of Haapakoski started to develop into a distinct area in the 19th century around the sawmill industry. This led to the growth of the village; in 1880 there were only 267 people in the village, which by 1910 had increased to 1,044. Further industrialization came after 1916, when SOK purchased lands in the area. In 1919, Haapakoski was given the status of taajaväkinen yhdyskunta, a densely populated area with a special status within a municipality. In 1920, Haapakoski was renamed to Vaajakoski, as there is another Haapakoski in Pieksämäki, which caused problems with postal services.

Haapaniemi still remained rural until the 1960s, as the municipality had acquired land from the Pellonpää farm in 1964 in order to construct a suburban area. Three years later, Puolimatka Oy was permitted to build the first apartments in the area. The quick expansion of the area gave Haapaniemi a negative reputation, due to which detached houses were soon built in the area.

Haapaniemi became a district of Jyväskylä after the disestablishment of Jyväskylän maalaiskunta in 2009.

== Services ==
=== School ===
There is a united daycare-school in Haapaniemi. The school only educates grades 1 and 2 (ages around 7–8). Further grades attend the Vaajakumpu school.

=== Other ===
There is a restaurant with rentable spaces in Noukanniemi, the southeastern part of the district. There is also a boat dock and a boater guidance center next to it.
