= Tikkakoski =

- Urban area and district of Jyväskylä
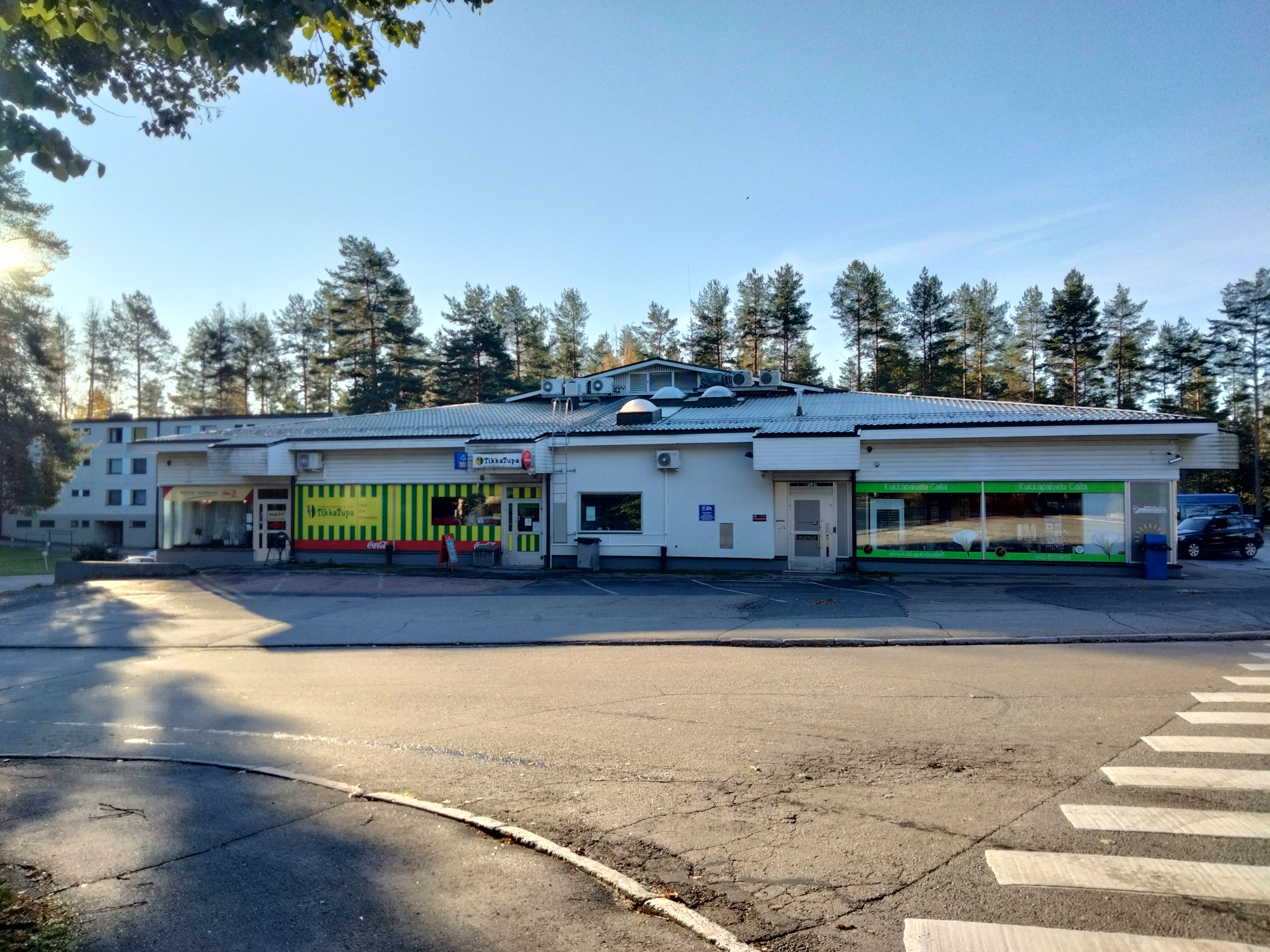
- View along the Myllylammenkatu street

- Location in Central Finland
- Coordinates: 62.3883°N 25.6458°E
- Country: Finland
- Region: Central Finland
- Sub-region: Jyväskylä sub-region
- City: Jyväskylä
- Ward: Tikkakoski-Nyrölä

Population (2023), urban area
  - Total: 4,094
  - Density: 684.6/km^{2} (1,773/sq mi)
- Time zone: UTC+2 (EET)
  - Summer (DST): UTC+3 (EEST)
- Postal code: 41160 TIKKAKOSKI

Tikkakoski is an urban area (a taajama) and a district of Jyväskylä, Finland, about 20 kilometers (12 mi) north of the city center. Before 2009, Tikkakoski was part of Jyväskylän maalaiskunta.

Having originally been part of Tikka-Mannila, Tikkakoski began to develop into a distinct industrial community around the 1890s. During the next century, the settlement continued to grow around industry and an air force garrison, which remained the largest employers in Tikkakoski until the early 1990s depression in Finland. After a decline in population due to the loss of jobs during the 1990s, Tikkakoski began to recover around the 2010s.

The urban area, as defined by Statistics Finland, had a population of 4,094 on 31 December 2023. The official district of the city does not correspond to this definition.

The Jyväskylä Airport, the Finnish Air Force Museum, and a Finnish Air Force base, with the FAF Headquarters, the Finnish Air Force Academy, Air Force Band, and the C4I Materiel Command, are all located in Tikkakoski.

== Etymology ==
The settlement of Tikkakoski is named after the Tikkakoski rapids of the river Autiojoki. The hydronym Tikkakoski (lit. 'woodpecker rapids') is not unique and appears elsewhere in Finland, being derived either directly from the word tikka meaning 'woodpecker' or the surname Tikka ~ Tikkanen. In this case, the name is likely derived from the surname, as it was found early on in the older nearby village of Tikka-Mannila.

== Geography ==
=== General ===
Tikkakoski is located in the far northern part of Jyväskylä near its borders with Laukaa and Uurainen, approximately 20 kilometers (12 mi) north of the city center. The biggest lake in the area is Luonetjärvi, which discharges into lake Korttajärvi via the river Autiojoki, while smaller ponds include Myllylampi, Koivulampi, Likolampi and Liinalampi. Hietajärvi is not a separate lake, but a section of Luonetjärvi.

=== Boundaries ===
On 31 December 2023, the urban area of Tikkakoski had a population of 4,094, a surface area of 5.98 square kilometers (2.31 sq mi) and a population density of 684.6 inhabitants per square kilometer (1,773/sq mi). The urban area is divided into Tikkakoski proper in the west and Liinalampi in the east. Other residential areas include Kummunmäki, Tunnelinmäki, Länsiranta and Itäranta. Tikkakoski is also the official name of Jyväskylä's 62nd district, while the 61st district is named Tikkamannila. The district named Tikkakoski only includes the northern part of the urban area, while its southern part belongs to the Tikkamannila district.

== History ==
Tikkakoski developed on lands of the village of Tikka-Mannila and, to a lesser extent, Korttajärvi (modern Puuppola and Kuikka).

The entirety of Tikka-Mannila was property of the Vehniä manor in Laukaa until the early 19th century, when 2,200 hectares (5,400 acres) of its land was used to form the Tikkamannila manor. This included the site of modern Tikkakoski, which was still mostly uninhabited in the latter half of the century, with the exception of one tenant farm (torppa) and a miller's house. The development of Tikkakoski into an industrial community began in 1890, when engineer Martin Stenij bought the area around the rapids, where a watermill and sawmill were already located. Stenij established a wool processing plant, a forging plant and a foundry by the rapids. Around the same time, a tar factory was established further southeast in the Liinalampi area, around which worker homes were built.

Stenij sold the factories of Tikkakoski to businessmen from the city of Jyväskylä in 1910, after which the watermill and sawmill were decommissioned. In 1912, the limited company (osakeyhtiö) Tikkakosken Rauta- ja Puuteollisuus was established and began producing motors and machine parts at the factories. Soon after Finland became independent from Russia in 1917, firearms became the company's main product. The company, which was renamed Oy Tikkakoski Ab in 1929, was one of Finland's earliest arms producers. The Liinalampi tar factory was closed in the 1920s.

Tikkakoski grew rapidly during the 1930s and 1940s as Oy Tikkakoski Ab expanded. In 1925, the factory employed 26 people, which had grown to 300 by 1937. In 1938, a Finnish Air Force unit was relocated to Tikkakoski and the construction of an airfield that later developed into the Jyväskylä Airport began. By 1944, the amount of employees had increased to around 1,000, though the production of firearms ended after the Continuation War. The factory was under Soviet ownership from 1944 to 1957, during which sewing machines were its main product. After the Soviet Union stopped importing sewing machines in 1964, the factory started producing studs for winter tires while also resuming firearm production at the end of the decade.

Between the 1930s and 1950s, the population of Tikkakoski had grown tenfold and the settlement was considered to be an urban area instead of a village. A zoning plan for Tikkakoski was made by the municipality (Jyväskylän maalaiskunta) in 1950. Buildings built according to the plan include a church built in 1957 and municipal healthcare buildings between 1961–1964. A new zoning plan was made in 1973, which allowed Tikkakoski to be expanded towards Liinalampi, filling the gap that had existed between the two. A new commercial center was also built along the street Kirkkokatu, replacing an earlier commercial area in Liinalampi. Apartment buildings were also built during the 1970s. In the 1950s, residential buildings were also built in the Länsiranta and Itäranta areas near the garrison.

A plan to abolish Jyväskylän maalaiskunta was made in 1967. According to the plan, most of the municipality's territory would have been transferred to the city with the exception of Tikkakoski, which was to become its own municipality including the village of Vehniä as well as the entire municipality of Uurainen. The plan was not considered after 1970.

Most people living in Tikkakoski were employed by either the factory or the Luonetjärvi garrison until the early 1990s depression in Finland. The population of the urban area began to decline during this time. New urban plans for Tikkakoski were made around this time, and the Tunnelinmäki area consisting of detached houses was built during the 2000s as the first residential area of Tikkakoski not established for factory workers.

Tikkakoski became part of the city of Jyväskylä in 2009, when the municipalities of Jyväskylän maalaiskunta and Korpilahti were consolidated with it. As one of modern Jyväskylä's areal centers, the population of Tikkakoski has begun to grow again in the 2010s.

== Services ==
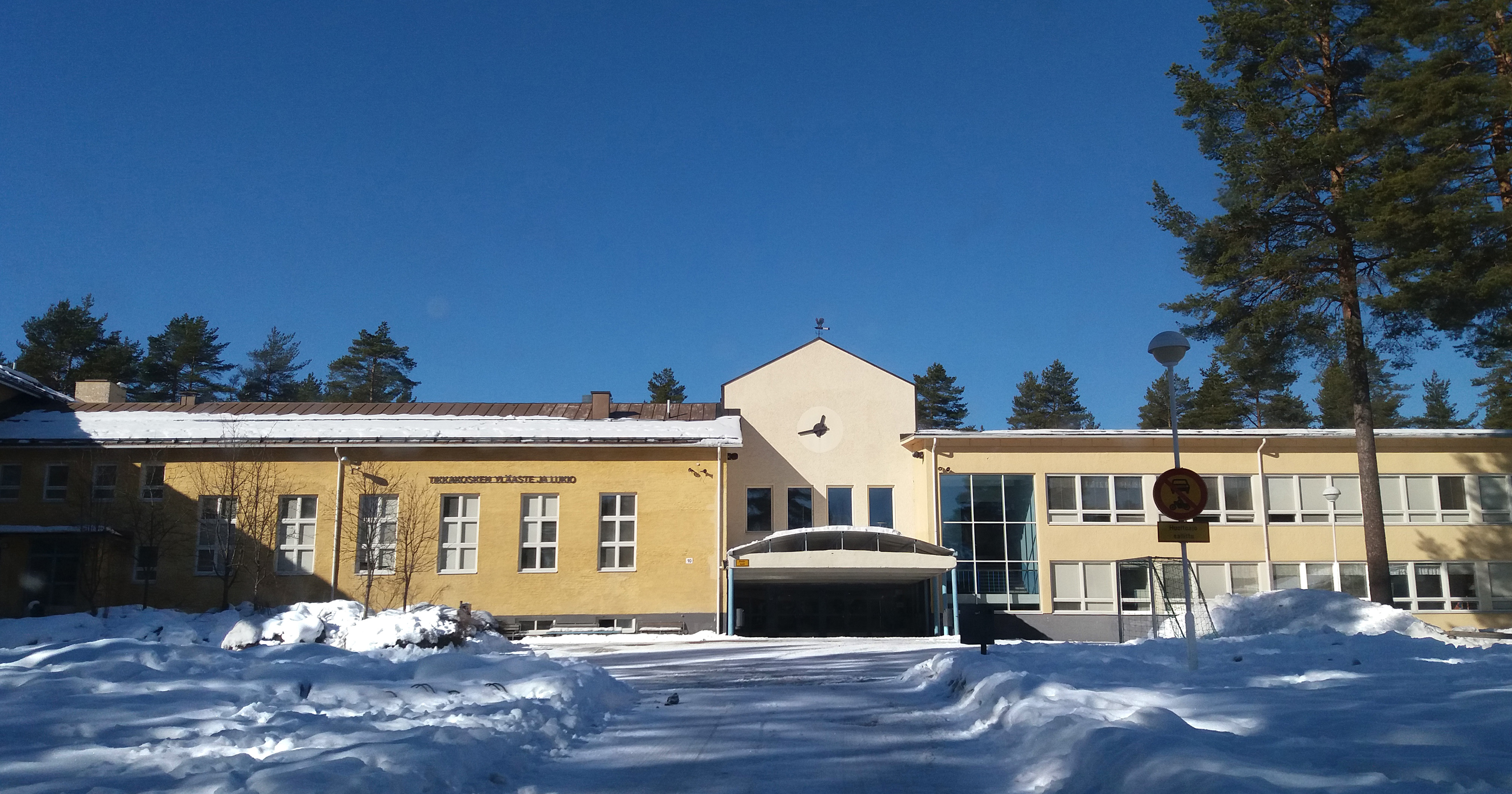
Tikkakoski secondary school

Services in Tikkakoski include two schools (Tikkakosken yhtenäiskoulu for grades 1–9 and Liinalammin päiväkotikoulu for grades 1–4), a library and two grocery stores.

=== Education ===
The first school in Tikkakoski (under the kansakoulu system) was established in 1936. The school was initially located in Liinalampi, but was moved to central Tikkakoski in 1943. A separate school for Liinalampi was established soon after in 1945. After the end of the Continuation War in 1944, Suojärvi was ceded to the Soviet Union and a private grammar school (oppikoulu) from the municipality was relocated to Tikkakoski. Classes were held in rented spaces until it acquired its own building in 1952. A new building for the Tikkakoski school was built in 1963, with the old building (Jyväsjoen koulu) being used for special education afterwards.

All three schools in Tikkakoski were transferred to the peruskoulu system in 1973, as was every other school in the municipality. Education for the lower grades of the new system was held at the Tikkakoski (later Luonetjärvi) and Liinalampi schools, while the upper grades shared the former grammar school building with a gymnasium (lukio). The upper school and Luonetjärvi school, as well as the school of Nyrölä, were merged in August 2015. The gymnasium was also disestablished at the same time.

== Church ==
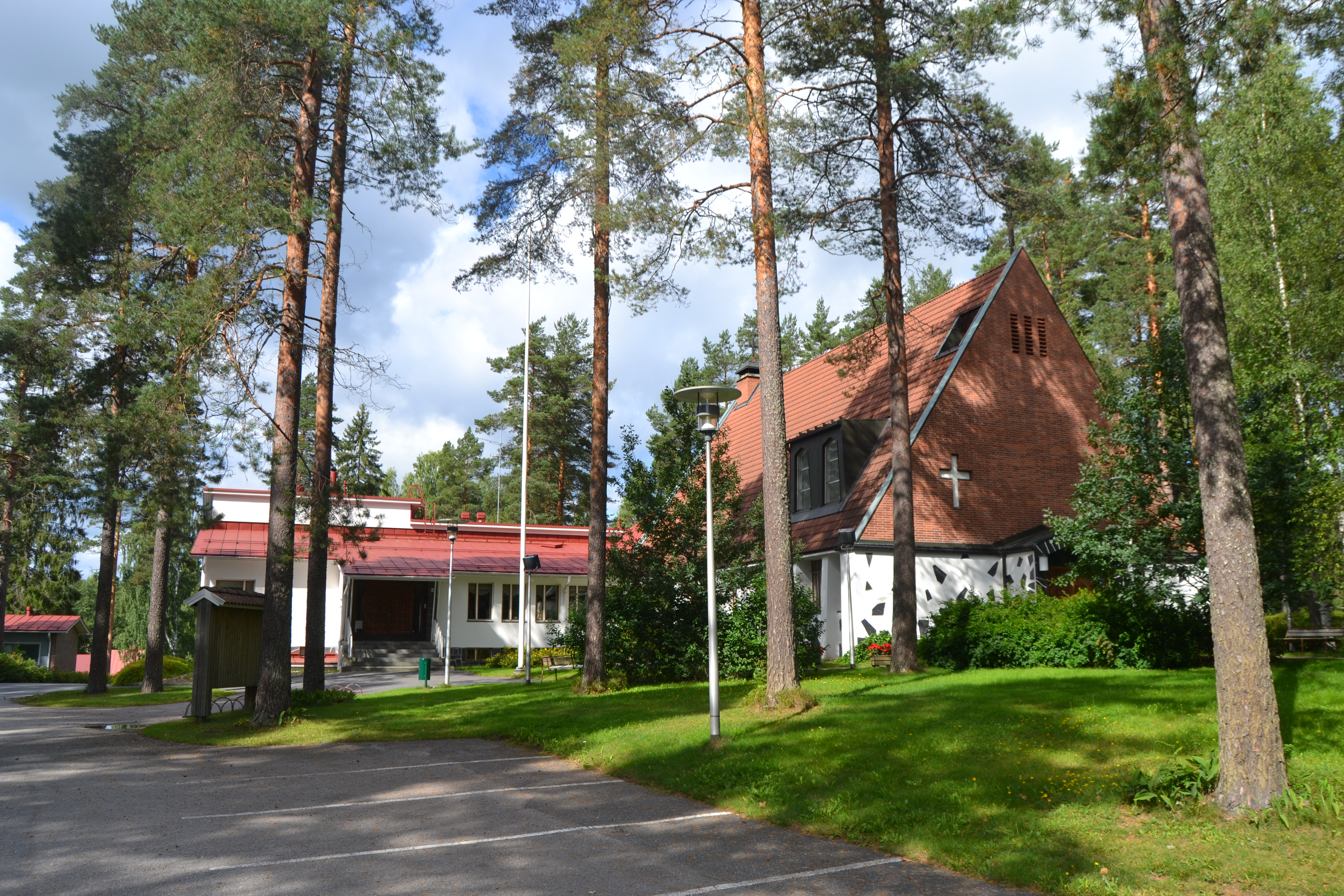
The church of Tikkakoski in 2013.

The Evangelical Lutheran church of Tikkakoski was designed by architect Olavi Kivimaa and opened in 1957. It has seats for 180 attendants and a meeting hall for parishioners. The church is rectangular in shape and steep-roofed, with a gable end made of brick and slate meant to resemble the wall of a medieval stone church.

The cemetery of Tikkakoski, established in 1976, is located in the Autiokangas residential area 6 kilometers (3.7 mi) south of central Tikkakoski and covers an area of about 10 hectares (25 acres).

== Gallery ==
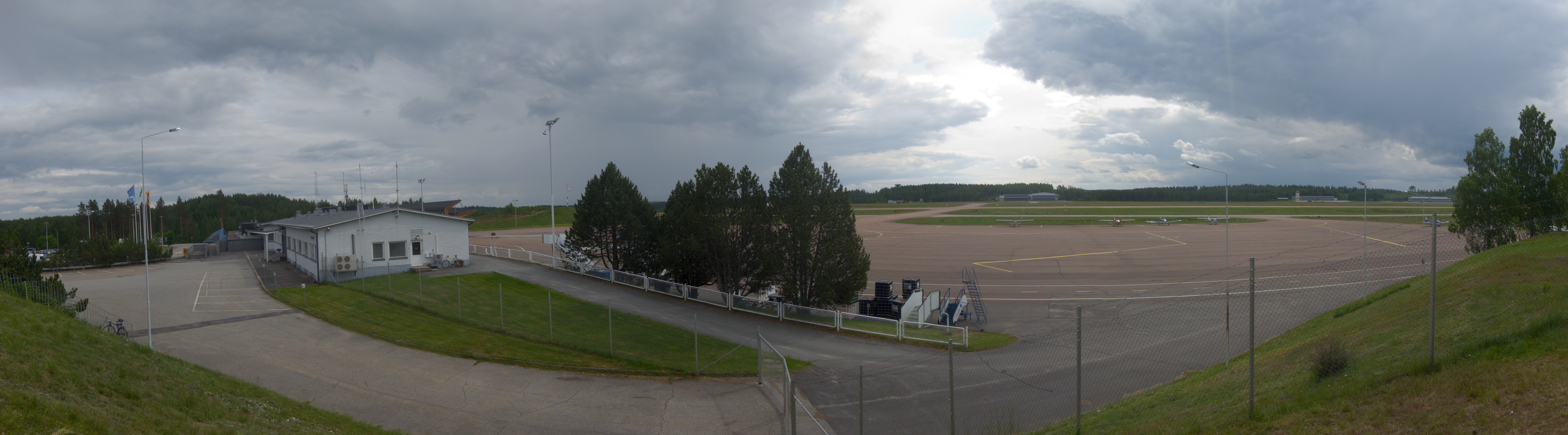
A view of the Jyväskylä Airport

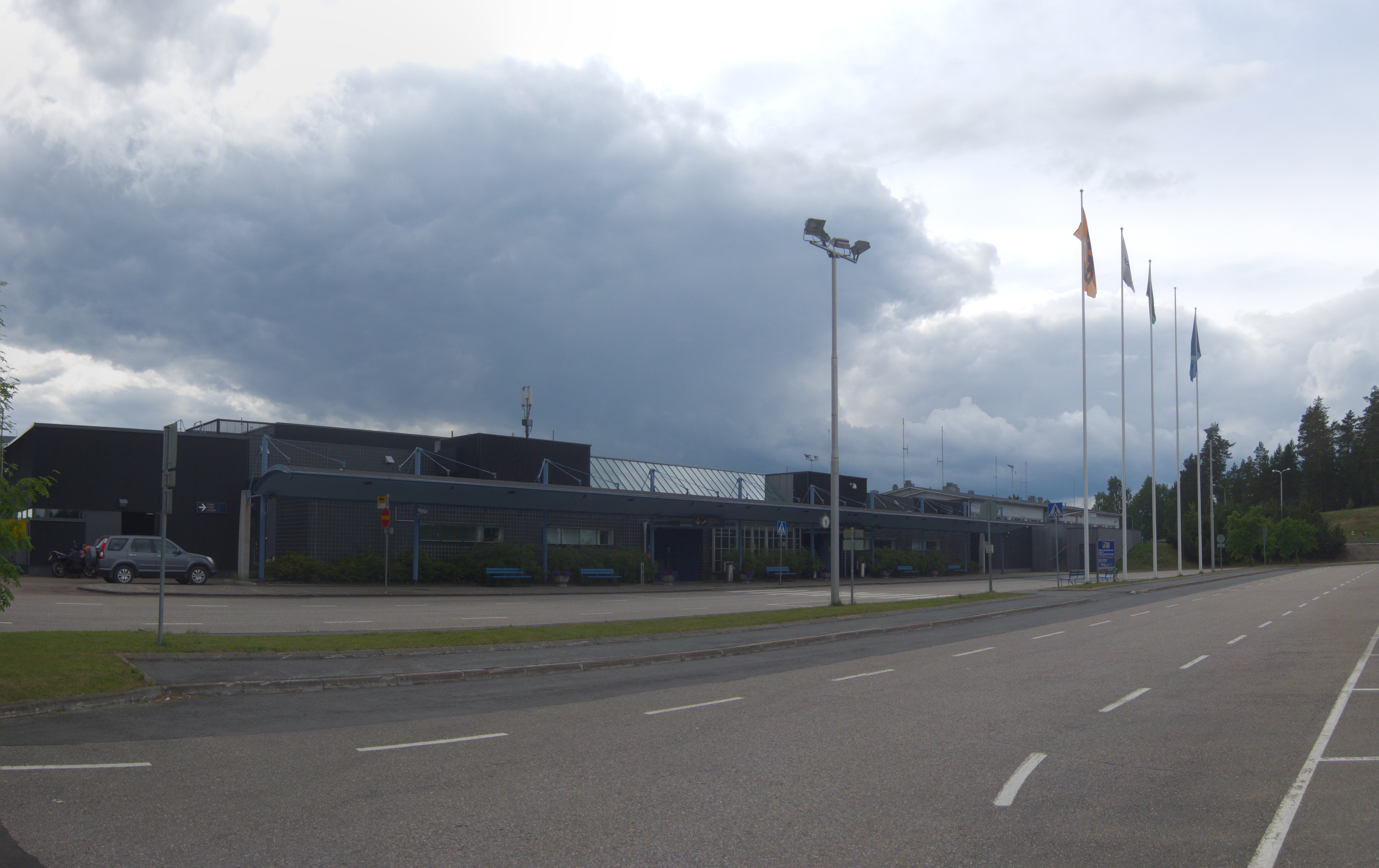
Jyväskylä Airport Terminal in Tikkakoski

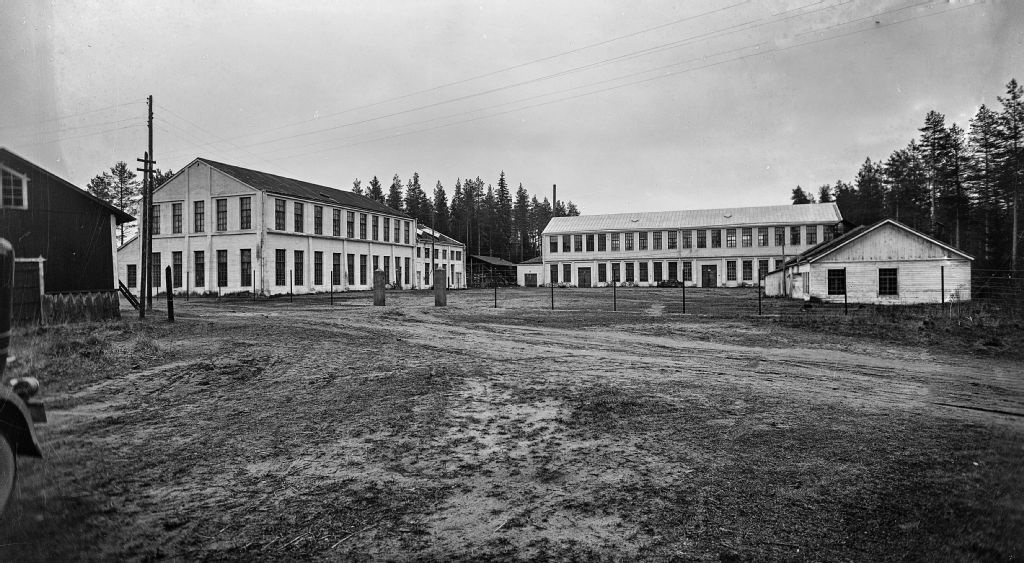
Oy Tikkakoski Ab gun factory in the 1930s

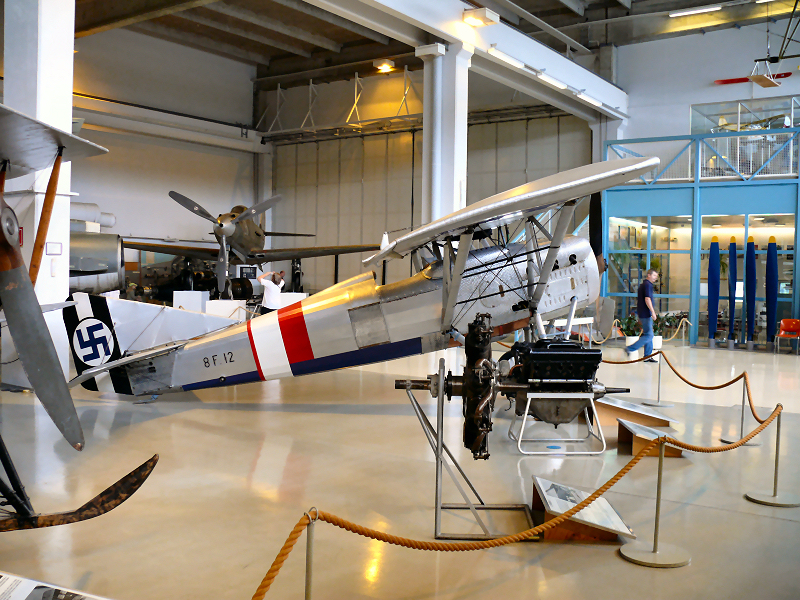
Gourdou-Leseurre fighter aircraft in the Aviation Museum of Central Finland
