= Tikka-Mannila =

Tikka-Mannila Tikkamannila
- District of Jyväskylä
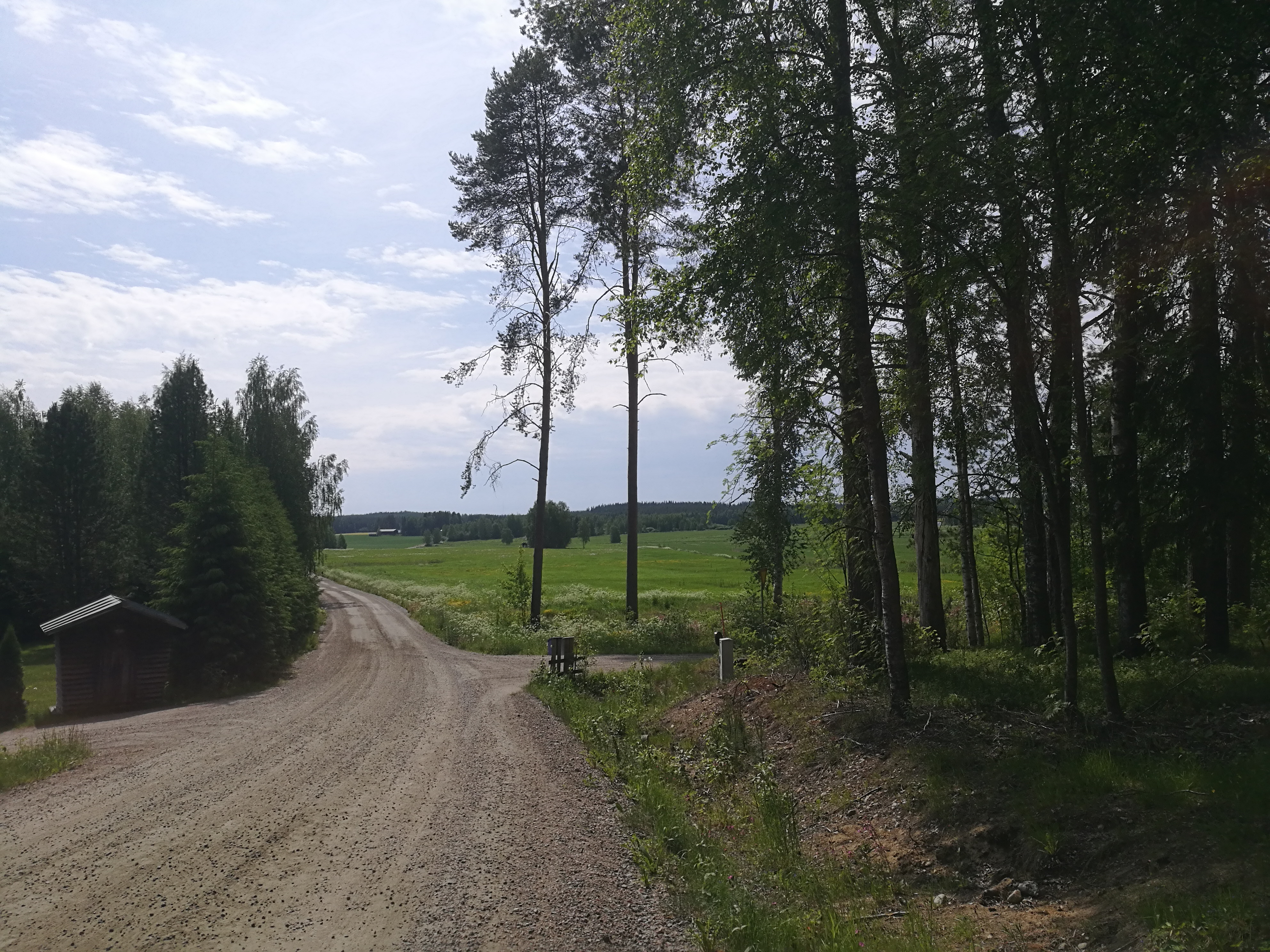
- View from the road Tikkamannilantie

- Location in Central Finland
- Coordinates: 62.3801°N 25.6938°E
- Country: Finland
- Region: Central Finland
- Sub-region: Jyväskylä sub-region
- City: Jyväskylä
- Ward: Tikkakoski-Nyrölä
- Time zone: UTC+2 (EET)
  - Summer (DST): UTC+3 (EEST)
- Postal code: 41160

Tikka-Mannila or Tikkamannila is a village and a district of Jyväskylä in Finland, located east of the Tikkakoski urban area. It was part of Jyväskylän maalaiskunta until its disestablishment in 2009. The national road 4 passes through Tikka-Mannila.

Tikka-Mannila was settled in the late 16th century, originally being part of the village of Vehniä in modern Laukaa. Tikka-Mannila consisted of a single farm until the mid-18th century. Starting in 1890, Tikkakoski began developing into a distinct industrial settlement, with Tikka-Mannila remaining a rural village.

== Names and etymology ==
The name of Tikka-Mannila originally referred to a farm. Its original name may have been *Mannila after the Savonian surname Manninen, first attested there c. 1585. The Tikka (or Tikkanen) family lived on the farm after them, with the current name coming into use soon after. The earliest written mention of the name is from 1782 as Ticka mannila.

The name may be spelled with or without a hyphen, Tikka-Mannila or Tikkamannila. For example, the National Land Survey of Finland and the Institute for the Languages of Finland use the hyphenated form, while the form used by the city of Jyväskylä for the official district is spelled without one.

== Geography ==
Tikka-Mannila is located in the northern part of Jyväskylä near its border with Laukaa. It is located to the east of Tikkakoski, while the village of Puuppola lies to its south. The Finnish national road 4 (nelostie) passes through Tikka-Mannila. Tikkamannila is also the official name of Jyväskylä's 61st district, which extends further west than the actual village, also comprising southern Tikkakoski and part of Kuikka.

A notable feature in the terrain of Tikka-Mannila, Puuppola and Jylhänperä are their wide open fields, large by Central Finnish standards. The fields are an important resting place for migratory birds as well as a nesting place for field birds such as the ortolan bunting, which is critically endangered in Finland. The drained lake Tervajärvi, part of the Natura 2000 network, is also located in Tikka-Mannila. The 20-hectare (49-acre) lake was drained between the 1940s and 1950s and its lakebed is now covered by meadows and flooded forest.

== History ==
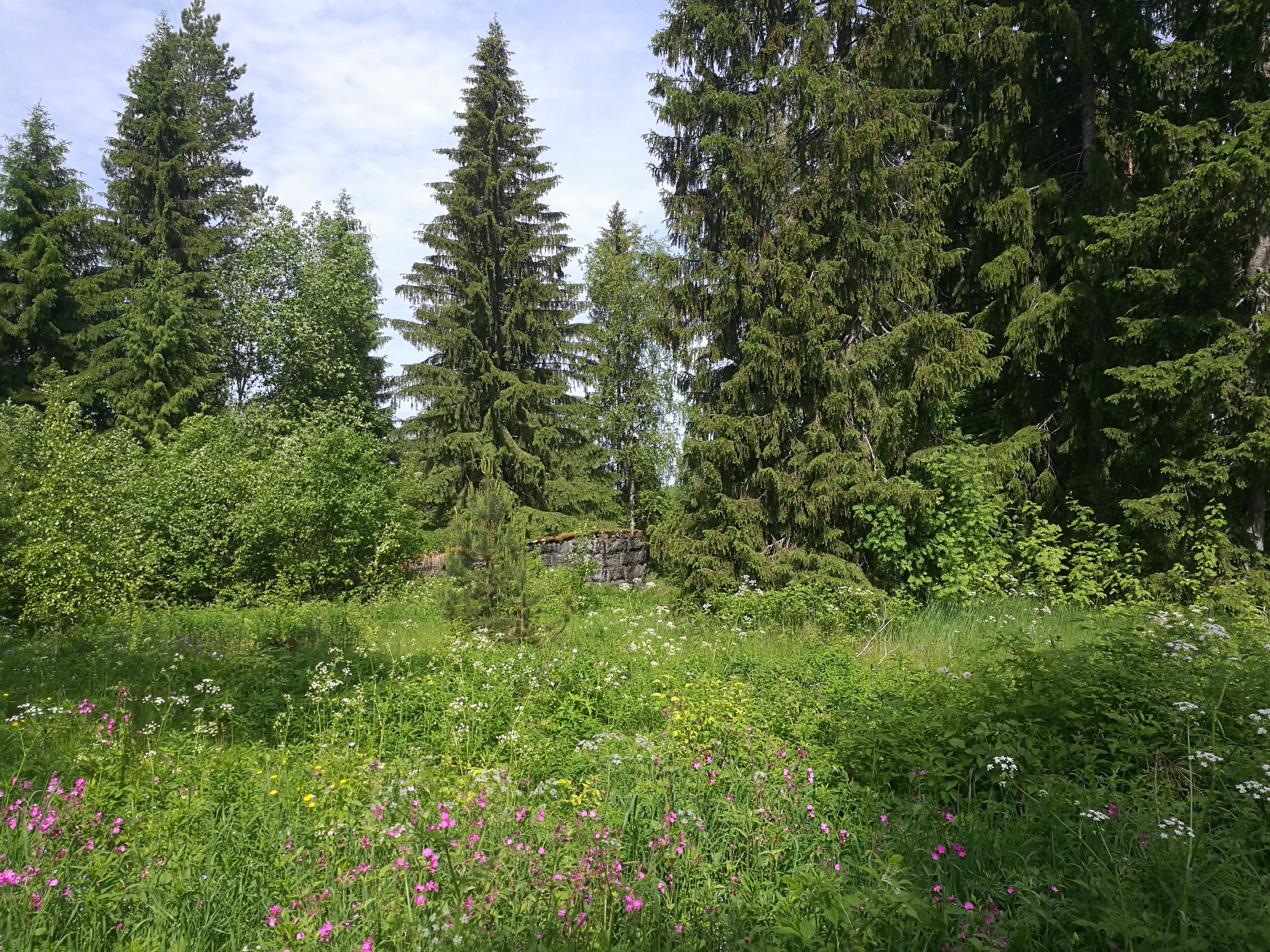
Ruins of the Tikka farm

Until the late 16th century, the area of Tikka-Mannila was uninhabited hunting grounds of Saarioinen (approximately modern Akaa and southern Sääksmäki). In 1562, Saarioinen was given as a fief to Klas Horn for his role in the Swedish conquest of Estonia. Horn began to buy former hunting grounds of Saarioinen in modern Central Finland, including Vesanka in 1564, which had already been settled by then. Horn died in 1566, after which the fief was held by his widow Kristina Krumme. The first mention of a settler in Tikka-Mannila is from 1586, when a leasehold estate (lampuotitila) under Krumme was rented to Eerik Manninen, of Savonian origin. The farm was counted as a part of Vehniä, which had been settled slightly earlier in 1579. The village of Vehniä only comprised two farms at the end of the century, nowadays known as Vehniä and Tikkamannila.

The area of Jyväskylä as well as Vehniä were part of the Jämsä parish until 1646, when they were transferred to Laukaa. After a church was built in the village of Jyväskylä c. 1676, a new parish subordinate to Laukaa was established around it. Tikka-Mannila became part of the Jyväskylä parish, while Vehniä did not.

As a holding of the Horn family, Tikka-Mannila was legally part of Saarijärvi, the central village of the parish of the same name during the 17th century. (Note: At the time, the legal definition of a village in the region was often based on land ownership and not actual settlement, with "villages" comprising holdings of the nobility being particularly discontinuous (see also Lievestuore).) Tikka-Mannila was no longer held by the Horn family after 1674 and later became a "crown farm" (kruununtila, paying taxes directly to the crown) in 1685. The Manninen family continued to hold the farm until the end of the century, when Mikko Tikkanen became its new owner. The farm was divided into two in 1753. The original farm was acquired by Henrik Limatius in 1756, while the newer remained under the Tikkanen family. In 1762, Limatius also acquired half of the Vehniä farm, which he had demanded from his nephew Antti.

Around the turn of the century, Henrik Limatius' son Karl Henrik Limatius had acquired both farms in Tikka-Mannila as well as the Vehniä farm, which was also referred to as a manor (kartano). After his death in 1816, the estates were inherited by his sister Maria Elisabet Limatius and after her death in 1829 by her son Bror Karl Johan Schöneman. The Tikkamannila estate was again separated from the Vehniä manor for Johan Larick, M. E. Limatius' widower, sometime before 1844.

The new 2,200-hectare (5,400-acre) Tikkamannila estate was also called a manor. In 1890, engineer Martin Stenij bought land from the estate around the Tikkakoski rapids of the river Autiojoki and established various factories in the area, starting the development of Tikkakoski into its own settlement.

In the early 20th century, the Tikkamannila manor was owned by the Swiss-born Constantin Bernhard, who had multiple tenant families on his lands. In 1909, Bernhard evicted 20 families, whose meadows prevented him from expanding the manor's own fields. As the judicial status of landless people was uncertain before Finland gained independence in 1917, the event seems to have had an effect on relations between landowners and tenants across Central Finland, with landowners becoming more tolerant of tenants on their lands.

After Constantin and Suoma Bernhard divorced in 1929, the manor was split into two estates, respectively called Tikka and Tikkamannila. New farms were established with state funding on the lands of the latter beginning in the 1930s. Later in the century, parts of Tikka-Mannila were used to expand the growing urban area of Tikkakoski, with the Kummunmäki and Ruunalampi residential areas being established on the village's lands.

The municipality of Jyväskylän maalaiskunta was consolidated with the city of Jyväskylä in 2009. On 8 October 2009, Tikka-Mannila became one of Jyväskylä's official districts.

== Services ==
Services in Tikka-Mannila include a daycare center and a riding hall. Most other services, such as schools and grocery stores, are located in Tikkakoski. The Jyväskylä Airport is also close to Tikka-Mannila.
