= Luonetjärvi =

Lake in Jyväskylä

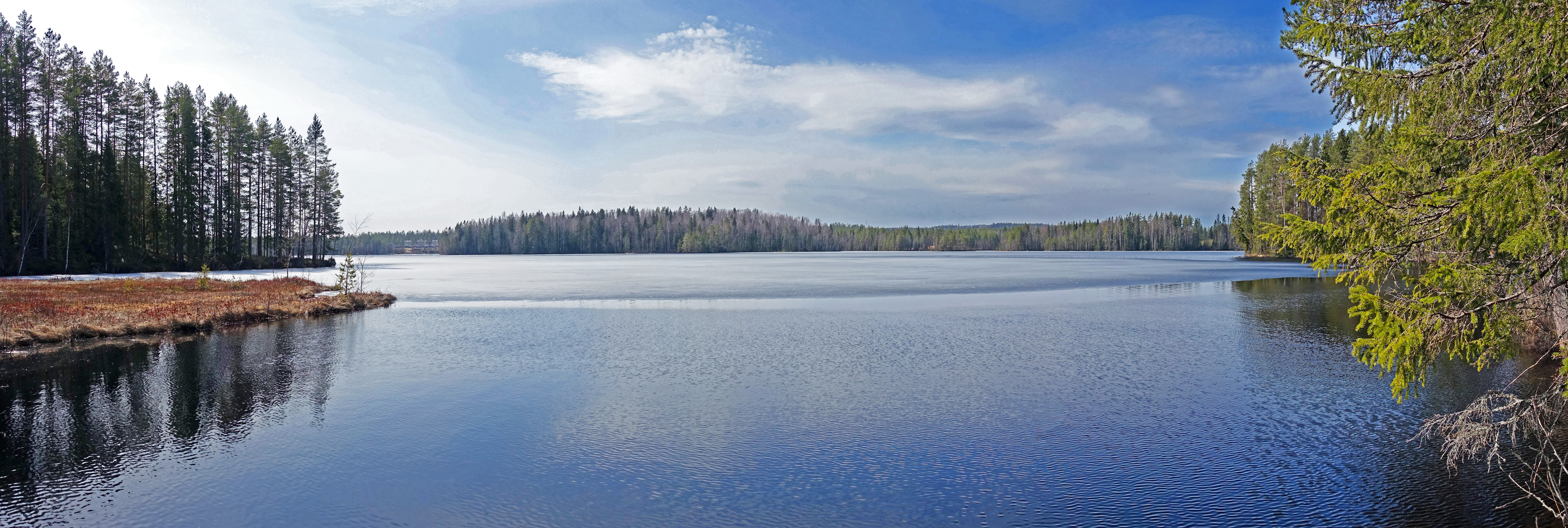
- Luonetjärvi seen from its eastern shore
- Interactive map of Luonetjärvi
- Location: Jyväskylä
- Coordinates: 62.407°N 25.610°E
- Primary outflows: Autiojoki
- Catchment area: 66 km^{2} (25 sq mi)
- Basin countries: Finland
- Max. length: 5 km (3.1 mi)
- Max. width: 450 m (1,480 ft)
- Surface area: 2.17 km^{2} (0.84 sq mi)
- Average depth: 4.7 m (15 ft)
- Max. depth: 20 m (66 ft)
- Water volume: 10,274,510 cubic meters (362,841,000 cu ft)
- Residence time: 8 months
- Shore length^{1}: 26.7 km (16.6 mi)
- Surface elevation: 135.3 m (444 ft)
- Islands: 45
- ^{1} Shore length is not a well-defined measure.

Luonetjärvi is a lake in Jyväskylä, Finland, covering an area of 2.17 square kilometers (0.84 sq mi). It is located northwest of the urban area of Tikkakoski in the far northern part of the municipality near its borders with Laukaa and Uurainen. The lake flows into Korttajärvi via the river Autiojoki.

== Etymology ==
The element Luon(n)et- is most likely derived from the verb luoda, which in this context may refer to flooding, to the melting of ice or to the setting of a fishing net. Historically, two other hydronyms containing Luonet- were found nearby: the river name Luonetjoki referring to Autiojoki, as well as Luonetkoski, the name of some rapids, either the Tikkakoski rapids of Autiojoki or some rapids in the outflow of lake Keskinen flowing into Luonetjärvi. The latter was mentioned as early as 1544 as Lonnekoskens Koskij. The name of Luonteri, a section of Saimaa, may have a similar origin.

== Geography ==
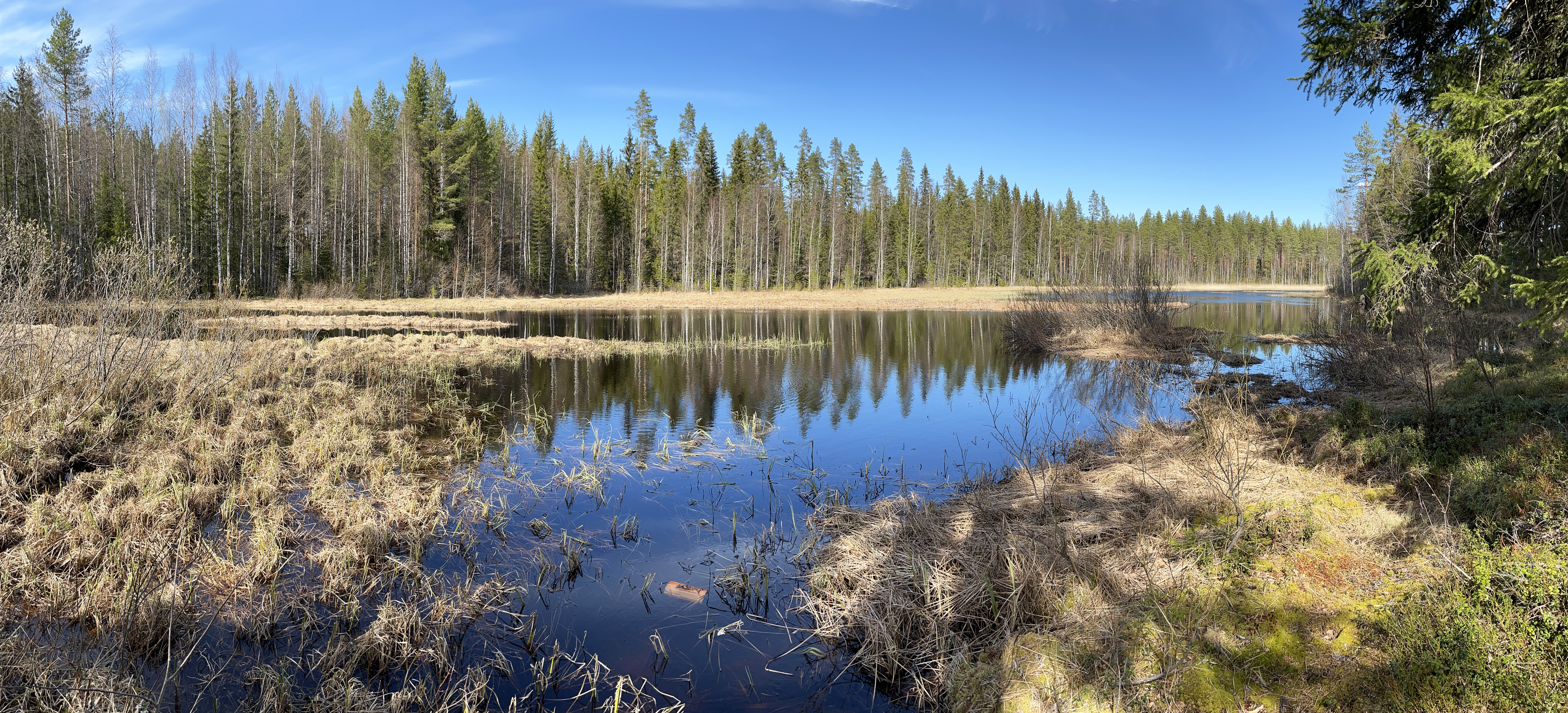
Northwestern end of Luonetjärvi

Luonetjärvi has an area of 2.17 square kilometers (0.84 sq mi) and a volume of 10.28 million cubic meters (363×10^{6} cu ft). It is long and fairly narrow in shape, with a length of 5 kilometers (3.1 mi) and an average width of 450 meters (1,480 ft). The lake is oriented northwest to southeast; its southeasternmost section, Hietajärvi, is connected to the main basin via the narrow Hietasalmi strait, which is crossed by a bridge. The urban area of Tikkakoski extends to the southern shores of the lake. The lake has 45 islands in total, most of which are very small and located near the shores, with the exception of the biggest islands Pukkisaari and Lammassaari. The average depth of the lake is 4.73 meters (15.5 ft), while the maximum depth is 20 meters (66 ft). Its deepest point is located in its mid-northern part, between the Peuraniemi and Sulkuniemi capes.

Luonetjärvi has a catchment area of 66 square kilometers (25 sq mi), extending into Laukaa and Uurainen. The lake is fed by a stream flowing into its northwesternmost part, carrying waters from the lakes Keskinen and Vääräjärvi. The outlet of the former (before the confluence of the two) has a catchment area of 34.6 km^{2} (13.4 sq mi), while the latter has one covering 16.6 km^{2} (6.4 sq mi). Some smaller streams also feed the lake, including one from Kaletonlampi and Särkilampi to the north, as well as one from Kaakkolampi flowing into Hietajärvi.

The outflow of Luonetjärvi itself is the river Autiojoki, which begins at the eastern end of Hietajärvi and flows south into lake Korttajärvi in the village of Puuppola, and has a length of 10.9 kilometers (6.8 mi). The surface elevation of Luonetjärvi is 135.3 meters (444 ft) from sea level, while that of Korttajärvi is 94.9 meters (311 ft), giving Autiojoki a total drop of 40.4 meters (133 ft).

The level of Luonetjärvi is regulated by a dam at the source of the Autiojoki. A dam has existed there since the late 19th century, while the modern dam was built in the 1950s. The source has an average discharge of 0.58 m^{3}/s (20 cu ft/s), a maximum of 7.03 m^{3}/s (248 cu ft/s) and a minimum of 0.013 m^{3}/s (0.46 cu ft/s). The lake retention time is estimated to be eight months. Plans to replace the dam with a weir that would allow fish to migrate between Luonetjärvi and Päijänne were made in 2018.

== Environmental values ==
=== Fishing ===
The most common fish in the lake are perch, roach, common bream and silver bream. Other species reported include pike, zander, common rudd, smelt, burbot, common whitefish, brown trout and grayling. The European crayfish is also found. Zander, brown trout, whitefish and rainbow trout have been stocked into the lake in the 21st century.

=== Recreation ===
The city of Jyväskylä maintains a 13-kilometer (8.1 mi) paddling route around Luonetjärvi, including two lean-to shelters. The Evangelical Lutheran parish of Jyväskylä also owns a campground at the northern end of the lake.
