= Jyväskylän maalaiskunta =

- Former municipality
- Jyväskylän maalaiskunta Jyväskylä landskommun
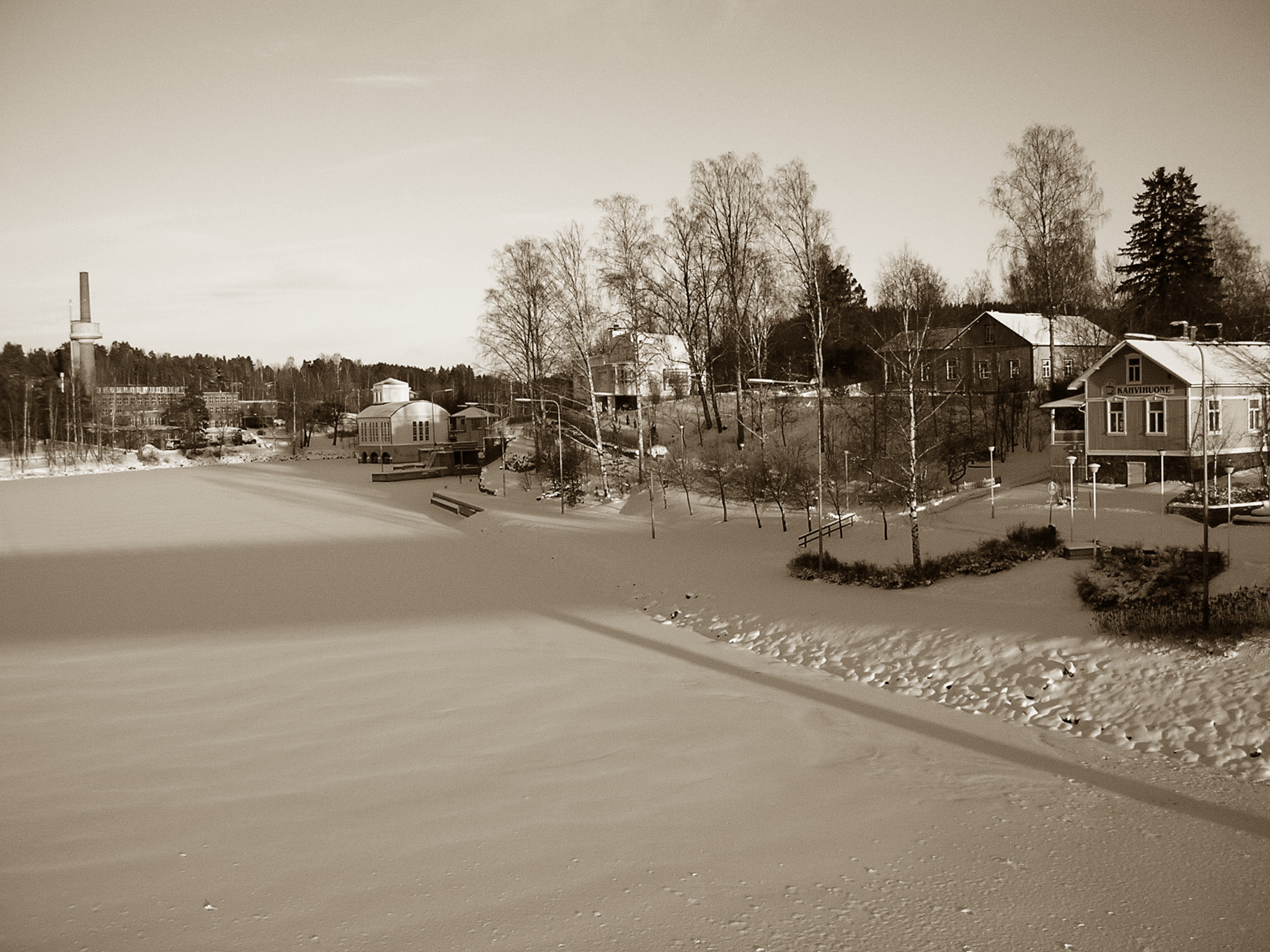
- Vaajakoski in the winter.

- Coat of arms

- Location of Jyväskylän mlk in Finland
- Coordinates: 62°17′20″N 025°44′30″E
- Country: Finland
- Province: Western Finland Province
- Region: Central Finland
- Established: 1868
- Merged into Jyväskylä: 2009
- Seat: Taulumäki

Area
  - Land: 450.76 km^{2} (174.04 sq mi)

Population (2008-12-31)
  - Total: 36,465

Jyväskylän maalaiskunta (Swedish: Jyväskylä landskommun), 'The Rural Municipality of Jyväskylä' is a former municipality of Finland. Together with Korpilahti, Jyväskylän maalaiskunta was consolidated with Jyväskylä on 1 January 2009. It was the last municipality to carry the name maalaiskunta.

Jyväskylän maalaiskunta had three population centres: Vaajakoski, Tikkakoski and Palokka. Jyväskylä Airport in Tikkakoski used to be one of the busiest in Finland. Jyväskylän maalaiskunta was the second biggest municipality without the name kaupunki (city, town) in Finland (the largest being Nurmijärvi). It was the last municipality with the name maalaiskunta, "rural municipality", one of the four types of municipality in Finland in 1865–1976.

The last municipality mayor of Jyväskylän maalaiskunta was Arto Lepistö.

== Geography ==
=== Distances ===
- Helsinki 270 km
- Kuopio 140 km
- Lahti 170 km
- Tampere 150 km

=== Villages ===
Prior to its consolidation into Jyväskylä in 2009, Jyväskylän maalaiskunta consisted of the following villages:

- Haapaniemi, Humalamäki, Ilmoniemi, Jylhänperä, Kaunisharju, Puuppola, Kuohu, Leppälahti, Mehtoniemi, Nyrölä, Oravasaari, Palokka, Perälä, Tikkakoski, Tikka-Mannila, Jyskä, Vaajakoski, Vesanka and Väinölä

== History ==
Areas transferred from Jyväskylän mlk to Jyväskylä before 2009

The original center of the area was the village of Jyväskylä. It was a part of either the Rautalampi parish or the Jämsä parish. Administratively Jyväskylä and Palokka were parts of the Saarioinen division (hallintopitäjä) while Keljo was a part of the Sääksmäki division. It became a part of the Laukaa chapel community in 1593, which became a separate parish in 1627/1628. The villages that would later form Jyväskylän maalaiskunta had been permanently transferred to the Laukaa parish by 1646.

Jyväskylä acquired its first chapel in 1676 and a church in 1693. The chapel community included the villages of Jyväskylä, Palokka, Keljo, Haapaniemi, Puuppola, Vesanka, Tikkamannila, Nyrölä as well as four farms from Leppävesi (and a fifth farm in the 1740s) that would later become Oravasaari and Toivakka. Vehniä, despite its transfer to Laukaa together with the other villages, remained a part of Laukaa proper.

The modern town of Jyväskylä was established in 1837. It became its own parish in the 1850s, which also included the territories that would become Jyväskylän maalaiskunta in 1868. The town and the municipality shared a parish until 1880. Toivakka was transferred from Laukaa to Jyväskylän mlk in 1871, remaining a part of it until 1910.

Vaajakoski and Palokka started growing in the 20th century, eventually merging into the built-up area of Jyväskylä in the 1980s while still remaining parts of Jyväskylän mlk. While the municipality gradually lost territory to the growing town, Jyväskylän mlk also acquired some territories from neighboring Laukaa, specifically from the register villages of Savio, Leppävesi and Vehniä. Small parts of Haukanmaa were also transferred from Toivakka to Jyväskylän mlk in 1975.

In 2009, Jyväskylän maalaiskunta and Korpilahti were merged into the town of Jyväskylä.

=== List of areal transfers ===
==== Areal transfers to the town ====
- 1860 (effectively 1888): Ramoinen, 0,2 km^{2} of land near the river Tourujoki formerly owned by the Taavettila farm
- 1914: Mäki-Matti, Savela, northern Valkeamäki and a strip of land near Lutakko
- 1941: Nisula (incl. Viitaniemi), Kortesuo, Tourula, Halssila, Lohikoski, Tarhamäki
- 1948: Lahjaharju and the site of later Huhtasuo and Kangasvuori
- 1965: Ruoke, Mannila, Seppälänkangas, Kuokkala, Haukkala, most of the village of Keljo (including Keljonkangas) and smaller areas
- 1968: a small triangle of land near Palokangas
- 1978: a part of what is now the Heinälampi suburb
- 1990: a strip of land between Äijälä and Väinölä for the road Kuokkalantie

==== Areas transferred from Laukaa ====
- 1947: the Sahamäki and Keskikoski farms near Vaajakoski
- 1953: Koskenvuori and Kotaniemi (the later Kaunisharju residential area)
- 1973: a small part of Vehniä for the Tikkakoski airport
- 1974: southern parts of Savio (including Mehtovuori) and smaller territories from Leppävesi

== Transportation ==
The geographically lowest of the six locks on the Keitele-Päijänne canal is located in Vaajakoski. The European routes E63 and E75 run through Jyväskylän maalaiskunta east and north of Jyväskylä, respectively. Likewise, the east- and westbound railway lines that leave Jyväskylä have been laid on the rural municipality's soil.

== Services and economy ==
Business life in Jyväskylän maalaiskunta is diversified. In addition to its conventional agriculture and forestry output, the municipality is home to companies such as Komas Oy, a system supplier of mechanical subassemblies, and Tikka Group, a manufacturer of studs for car winter tires (the situation as of 2006). Historically, Vaajakoski hosted a wide range of conventional industries up until the 1980s when structural changes in Finland's economy resulted in a shutdown of many long-standing factories and mills also in Jyväskylä's rural sibling. However, still actively operating in Vaajakoski's industrial area is the Panda chocolate and sweets factory, whose products are marketed the world over.

Palokankeskus in Palokka is a significant commercial area by the national road 4.
