= Oravasaari =

- District of Jyväskylä
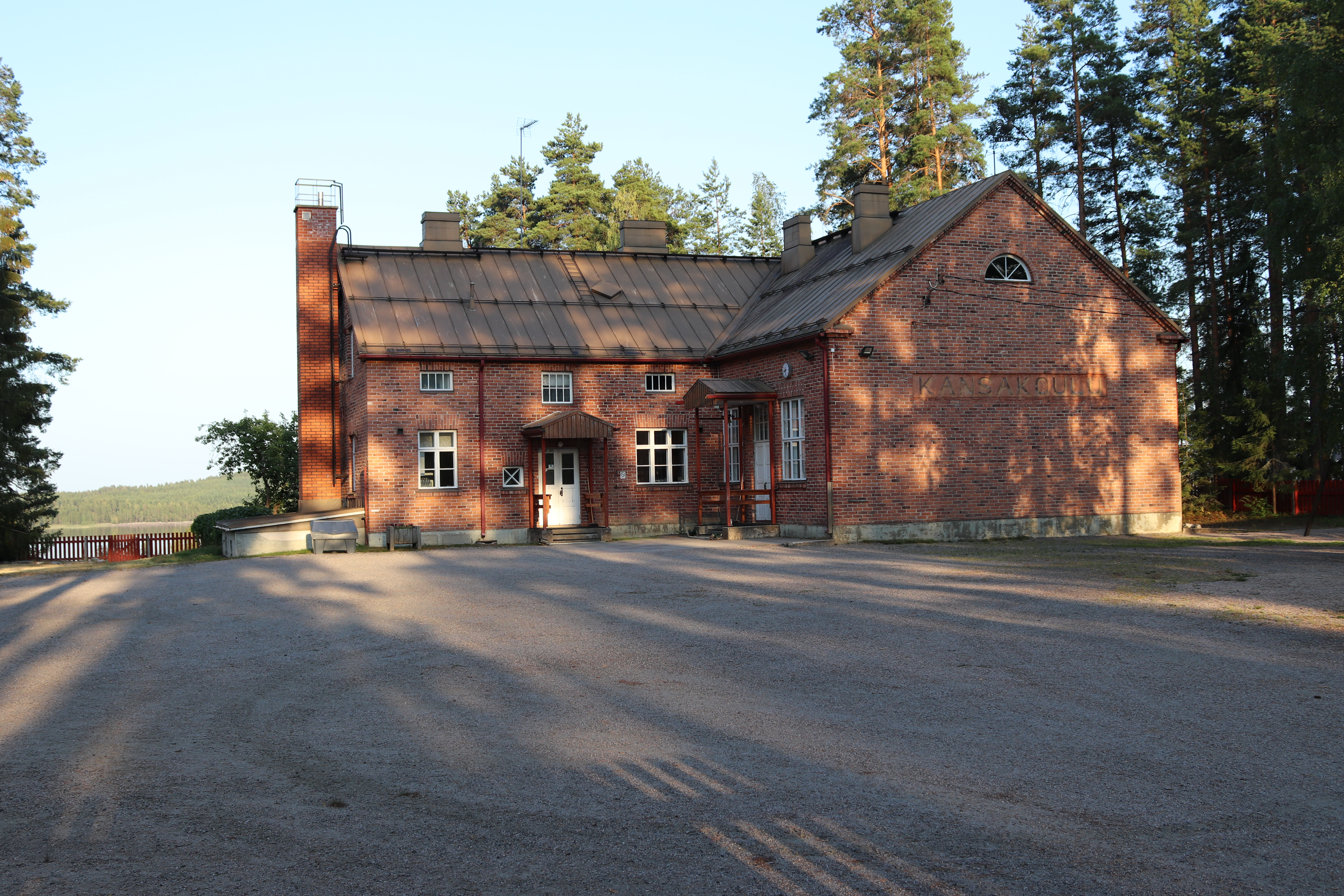
- Oravasaari school

- Location in Central Finland
- Coordinates: 62.1678175°N 25.9164513°E
- Country: Finland
- Region: Central Finland
- Sub-region: Jyväskylä sub-region
- City: Jyväskylä
- Ward: Vaajakoski-Jyskä

Population (2021-12-31)
  - Total: 342
- Time zone: UTC+2 (EET)
  - Summer (DST): UTC+3 (EEST)

Oravasaari is a district of Jyväskylä and a village in Central Finland. Before consolidation in 2009, it was a part of Jyväskylän maalaiskunta. It is located in the southeastern part of Jyväskylä near Toivakka and between the major lakes Päijänne and Leppävesi. The direct distance to central Jyväskylä is about 12 km, while the distance to Vaajakoski is about 10 km.

== Geography ==
Oravasaari is located between the lakes Päijänne and Leppävesi. There is also an island called Oravasaari (also called Manunsaari) nearby in the Leppävesi, however it is a part of the Leppälahti district. The statistical area (pienalue) is larger than the district (kaupunginosa, for areal development), as the area of Pohjola further south is a separate district.

== History ==
The name of Oravasaari literally means "squirrel island", referring to trapping of squirrels in the area.

The area was initially owned by the men of Hauho as hunting grounds, which is reflected in nearby place names, as a fjard (part of a lake) of the Päijänne near Oravasaari is called Hauhonselkä, while the names beginning with Ilmo- such as Ilmopohja may refer to the village of Ilmoila in Hauho. The first settler in Oravasaari was a Tavastian man from Hauho named Erkki Erkinpoika, who came to the area in 1552 and established the farm of Oravasalo. He was mentioned as Erich Oraua in 1571. The Oravasalo farm was divided twice, first in 1607 and later in 1621, resulting in the establishment of the farms of Oravasaari (later Sipilä and Knuutila), Rantala, Juusola and Puura.

Oravasaari and Toivakka were originally parts of the village of Leppävesi. The separation of Oravasaari from Leppävesi began after the establishment of the Jyväskylä chapel community under the Laukaa parish around 1693, when four farms from Leppävesi were transferred to the Jyväskylä chapel community. Jyväskylä became a separate parish in 1856 and the municipality of Jyväskylän maalaiskunta was established in 1868.

The Great Partition (Isojako) in the 19th century caused an increase in the population of Oravasaari, as there were only a hundred inhabitants in the beginning of the century, which had increased to over 700 by the mid-19th century. As a result of the Second World War, some 140 displaced Karelians, mostly from Sortavalan maalaiskunta (around Sortavala), were resettled to Oravasaari.

After Jyväskylän maalaiskunta was consolidated with the town of Jyväskylä in 2009, Oravasaari became one of Jyväskylä's districts.

== Services ==
The services available at Oravasaari include services related to agriculture and forestry.

=== School ===
Oravasaari has a school for grades 1–4. The school was established in 1891, however the current main building was built in 1929.

=== Other ===
Villa Jääskelä located in the former Jääskelä farm includes rentable accommodation and meeting spaces.
