= Vehniä =

Village in Laukaa, Finland

- Village
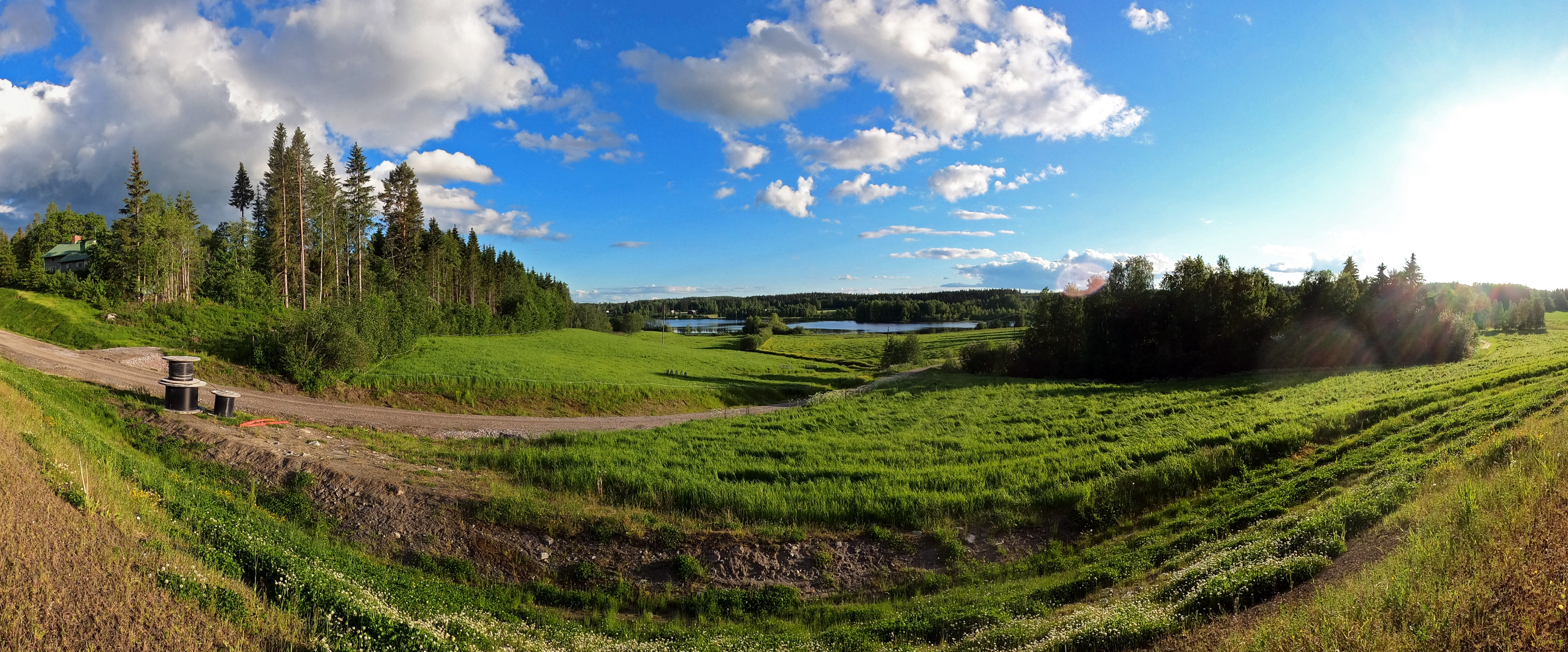
- Fields in Vehniä

- Location in Central Finland
- Coordinates: 62.4381°N 25.6825°E
- Country: Finland
- Region: Central Finland
- Sub-region: Jyväskylä sub-region
- Municipality: Laukaa

Population (2020-12-31)
  - Total: 915
- Time zone: UTC+2 (EET)
  - Summer (DST): UTC+3 (EEST)
- Postal code: 41180
- Website: https://www.vehnia.fi/

Vehniä (Finnish pronunciation: [ˈʋehniæ]) is a village in the municipality of Laukaa in Central Finland, Finland. It is located along Highway 4 (E75), about 25 kilometers (16 mi) north of the city of Jyväskylä near Jyväskylä Airport. As of 31 December 2020, the statistical area of Vehniä had a population of 915.

The historical center of the village is the Vehniä Manor, located on the shores of Lake Alasenjärvi. Gustaf Oskar Schöneman (1839–1894), known as the lyricist of the Christmas carols "Joulupuu on rakennettu" and Finnish translation of "Silent Night", was born in the manor. The village is home to the Vehniä Baptist Church, and one of Finland's three Lidl distribution centers is also located there.

== Etymology ==
The name of Vehniä was first attested in 1551 as part of the place names wächinne maa, wähä wähinene kallio and weheme maa. It is likely derived from the word vehnä 'wheat', with the addition of a toponymic suffix -ia ~ -iä found elsewhere in historical Tavastia. Despite being a rare crop at the time, both pollen samples and contemporary court documents confirm that wheat has been cultivated in Laukaa since the 16th century. The name would therefore refer to "a place where wheat grows".

== Geography ==
Vehniä is the westernmost village in Laukaa, bordering Jyväskylä in the south and Uurainen in the north and west. Neighboring settlements include Rajajärvi in the east, Tikkakoski and Tikka-Mannila in the south and Hirvaskylä in the north. The Jyväskylä Airport is located near Vehniä and separates the village from the urban area of Tikkakoski. Parts of Vehniä with their own names include Alapohja, Hääkoski, Jussilanmutka, Mäkikylä, Nyppösenmutka, Pökköperä and Yläpohja.

As with most other Central Finnish villages, most of Vehniä is forested. The village lies on a drainage divide within the greater Päijänne catchment area, with lakes in its northern part discharging to the north and those in the southern part to the south. The divide is visible along the national road 4 as the Himmanharju esker. Most lakes are fairly small with turbid water, with the exception of the village's biggest lake Iso-Hirvanen, whose water is relatively clear. Other lakes include Alanen, Koululampi and Syväjärvi.

== History ==
The first known settler in Vehniä was Heikki Eerikinpoika, first recorded in 1579. His place of origin is unknown, but he was likely of Tavastian origin due to his lack of a surname (Eerikinpoika is a patronymic). A second farm was established in 1586 by Eerik Manninen, later developing into the village of Tikka-Mannila. During the 16th century, Vehniä was often counted as part of Korttajärvi.

Vehniä was part of the Jämsä parish until 1646, when it was transferred to Laukaa along with the villages of the Jyväskylä area. After a church was built in the village of Jyväskylä c. 1676, a new parish subordinate to Laukaa (kappeliseurakunta) was established around it. While Tikka-Mannila was included into the new parish, Vehniä proper remained part of Laukaa.

The Vehniä farm appears to have been held by Heikki's descendants until 1698, when it passed to Hannu Liimatainen, son-in-law of the previous owner Yrjänä Laurinpoika. Liimatainen came to Vehniä from the village of Liimattala in Saarijärvi (later Konginkangas). Liimatainen became a local representative (nimismies) in Laukaa and Latinized his surname to Limatius. Rural court hearings were held at the Vehniä farm until the early 18th century. In 1755, the farm was divided into two between Hannu's grandsons Antti and Kaarle Limatius, but the former had to give his half to his uncle Henrik in 1766. Henrik had already owned land in Korttajärvi and Tikka-Mannila, and moved from Korttajärvi to Vehniä in 1772.

New farms began to be established in the late 18th century. In 1776, tenant farmer Yrjänä Läsä from Niemisjärvi (in modern Hankasalmi) bought an estate for himself. A new estate called Hovila was established on the northern shore of lake Iso-Hirvanen in 1786, but it was not an independent farm, instead being held by the Limatius family and rented out to leaseholders. The Great Partition was carried out in Vehniä between 1797 and 1800, but no new farms were established during it. Around the same time, the western hinterlands of Petruma (Valkola) that would later be seen as parts of Vehniä were being settled. The Hirvasmäki farm was established around 1766 on the eponymous hill near the lake Iso-Hirvanen, followed by two farms established between the lakes Rajajärvi and Iso-Pitkä around 1784.

By 1804, the entirety of Vehniä and Tikka-Mannila had been acquired by Karl Henrik Limatius. The first complete census of Vehniä's population was made in 1806, according to which there were 145 people living in the village, most of whom were tenant farmers of the Vehniä manor. Most homes were located along or near the road connecting Jyväskylä to Saarijärvi. Vehniä remained an important stop along the road, with the manor functioning as an inn and a post office until a new road was built through Pellosniemi in the 1840s, causing the old road passing through Vehniä to lose its importance. The manor was held by the Limatius family until 1829, then by Bror Karl Johan Schöneman (son of the previous owner Maria Elisabet Limatius) until his death in 1864, after which the Schöneman family went bankrupt and the manor was later acquired by the Hirvinen family in the 1870s. Hovila also became an independent farm in 1870, held by its last leaseholder Juhana Kustaanpoika, who took the surname Hovilainen after the name of the farm.

The population continued to grow; by 1850 there were 350 people living in Vehniä, increasing to around 700 by the end of the century (both including the nearby areas officially part of Petruma). In 1900, the Vehniä manor had 334 tenants in total. Less than a year after Finland declared independence in 1917, a law was passed allowing tenant farmers to redeem their homes for themselves. Tenants of the manor began doing so in 1920, with the last tenant farm becoming independent in 1928. Wholly new farms were also established around the same time, and by 1933, there were 70 new small farms in the village. After World War II, about a hundred Karelian refugees were settled in Vehniä.

A plan to abolish the neighboring municipality of Jyväskylän maalaiskunta was made in 1967, according to which a new Tikkakoski municipality that would have included Vehniä as well as all of Uurainen was to be established. The plan was not considered after 1970. However, a small part of Vehniä was transferred from Laukaa to Jyväskylän maalaiskunta in 1974 to provide room for the airport.

In 1974, a bus carrying Dutch tourists collided with a truck while overtaking, resulting in the deaths of 12 people and the injury of 18 others.

== Economy and services ==
The main sources of income in Vehniä are agriculture and forestry, but small-scale industry is present as well. The biggest individual employer in the village is a Lidl distribution center. Aside from a school and a daycare center, Vehniä does not have many services of its own, with the closest ones being found in Tikkakoski, Laukaan kirkonkylä and Jyväskylä.

=== School ===
There is a school in Vehniä for grades 1–6 (alakoulu), sharing its main building with a daycare center. It was established in 1896, making it the third oldest school in Laukaa. Classes were initially held in the Vehniä manor until a separate school building was finished in 1897. The building was expanded in 1937. Electricity and running water were installed in the early 1950s, but the building was seen as too small and requests to build a new one were made soon. The new school building, about 800 square meters (8,600 sq ft) in size, was finished in 1977 and the original building was demolished.
