= Puuppola =

- District of Jyväskylä
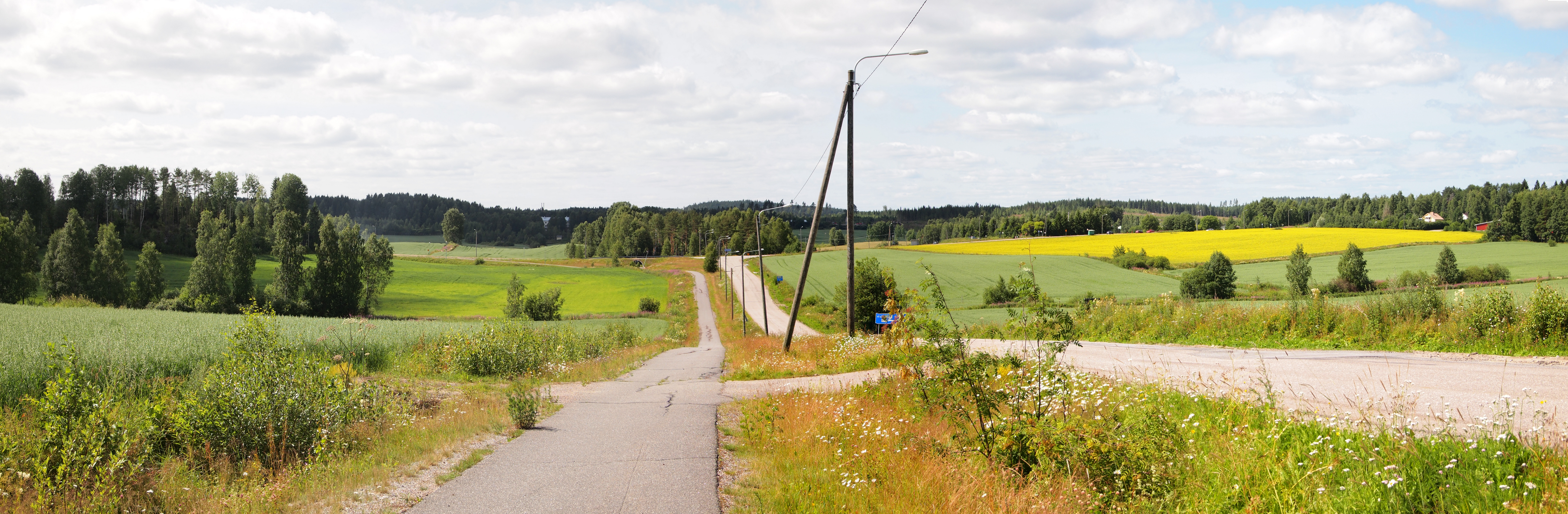
- View from the road Puuppolankoskentie

- Location in Central Finland
- Coordinates: 62.339°N 25.683°E
- Country: Finland
- Region: Central Finland
- Sub-region: Jyväskylä sub-region
- City: Jyväskylä
- Ward: Palokka-Puuppola

Population (2021-12-31), statistical area
  - Total: 2,000
- Time zone: UTC+2 (EET)
  - Summer (DST): UTC+3 (EEST)
- Postal code: 41120

Puuppola is a village and district of Jyväskylä, Finland, located in the northern part of the city between the urban areas of Palokka and Tikkakoski. Before 2009, it was a part of Jyväskylän maalaiskunta. The distance from Puuppola to downtown Jyväskylä is 14 kilometers (8.7 mi), while the distance to both Palokka and Tikkakoski is around 8 kilometers (5.0 mi).

Historically known as Korttajärvi after a nearby lake, the village was settled around 1566. The modern village of Kuikka also developed from this initial settlement. Puuppola began expanding to its current size in the 20th century.

On 31 December 2021, the statistical area of Puuppola had a population of 2,000.

== Etymology ==
The name of Puuppola is derived from a farm name, which in turn refers to a surname Puuppo (Puupponen). The meaning of the surname is unknown.

The name Korttajärvi, which has been used as the official village's name, comes from the name of the nearby lake. As the word kortta has not been attested from the dialects spoken in the region, the element kortta- is likely a corruption of korte ("horsetail").

== Geography ==
=== General ===
The landscape of central Puuppola is characterized by wide fields in valleys between ridges. Most fields and houses in the area are located along larger roads. Due to growth during the 20th and 21st centuries, parts of Puuppola have come to resemble suburban areas. While the terrain is generally hilly, most hills are quite low, with the highest hills in the village center having an elevation of 60 meters (200 ft) above the surface of lake Korttajärvi. The hill Punavuori in the eastern part of Puuppola is more prominent and steep, reaching a height of 80 meters (260 ft) above the lake Lehesjärvi. Other lakes in Puuppola include Alvajärvi, Ykshaukinen, Ahvenlampi and Hylkylampi.

=== Boundaries ===
The 52nd district of Jyväskylä is officially named Puuppola. The district encompasses an area from the Finnish national road 4 in the east to the areas of Saarenmaa and Vertaala in the west, while the areas around lake Lehesjärvi east of the national road are part of the Matinmäki and Kuukanpää districts.

The official land register village of Korttajärvi was an area wider than that of modern Puuppola, also including Kuikka, Hiekkapohja and parts of Tikkakoski. Register villages, which generally did not correspond to local definitions of villages, were officially abolished in 2014.

== History ==
The first mention of a settler in Korttajärvi, Pekka Puupponen, comes from 1566. Puupponen was most likely from Hauho where, in the village of Vitsiälä, the surname Puuppo (Puppoi) had been attested since 1486. Prior to being settled, the area of Korttajärvi was hunting grounds of Eerik Tunkeloinen, who was a local representative (nimismies, comparable to a sheriff) in Längelmäki, at the time part of the Kulsiala administrative division (hallintopitäjä). Tunkeloinen had hidden his ownership of Korttajärvi to prevent it from being taxed until Puupponen settled there, after which he was forced to pay a fine of 40 Swedish marks. Between 1572 and 1573, a short-lived settlement called Jyväspohja also existed near the lakes Korttajärvi and Alvajärvi. Its name may have referred to a settler from (the village of) Jyväskylä, or to the Jyväsjoki watercourse beginning from lake Jyväsjärvi.

In the 16th century, the Puupponen family appears in multiple court records regarding conflicts with the settlers of Palokka and Vesanka. In 1572, Pekka Puupponen was fined for bruising Heikki Pekanpoika from Palokka, and again in 1578 for stealing 15 fathoms of rye from Lauri Pörsöinen of Vesanka. In 1582, Puupponen had claimed that Tuomas Soikkanen and his neighbors from Vesanka had beaten his son to death and burned down his granary. The Puupponen family also claimed to have rights to the lands around lake Alvajärvi supposedly granted to them by King John III of Sweden, even though there were meadows and pastures owned by the villagers of Palokka and Jyväskylä in the area. Due to the dispute, Pekka and his sons raided the village of Palokka. After the king was informed of the dispute in 1583, he confirmed that the disputed lands belong to Palokka and Jyväskylä and had the Puupponen family repay the damages they had caused.

The Puuppola farm was the only estate in the village until 1589, when Pekka's son Eerik Puupponen established a new farm on the shore of lake Heinonen, in the area that would later be known as Kuikka. Vehniä and Tikka-Mannila were also often counted as part of the village of Korttajärvi in the 16th century. Two new farms, later known as Loukiala and Laulainen, were established near the Puuppola farm respectively in 1607 and 1617. The Puuppola farm was divided into two in 1753. The first tenant farms (torppa) in the village were established in the 1760s.

The modern landscape of Puuppola started developing during the 18th century with the clearing of new fields. A road between Jyväskylä and Saarijärvi has passed through Puuppola at least since the 19th century. However, it was not until the 20th century when the village started to grow quickly, especially after the end of World War II and the settlement of Karelian refugees. The modern center of the village has developed around the farms of Puuppola, Mommila, Laulaala, Pyyhkölä, Raitala and Loukiala. Many new homes were established on the lands of the Tanttila farm, which had been bought by the municipality before World War II for that purpose.

In the mid-1980s, there were approximately 1,400 people living in Puuppola. As Puuppola was connected well to the rest of Jyväskylä, new people started moving into the village soon and by the early 1990s, its population had increased to 1,600. As deindustrialization had affected nearby Tikkakoski around the same time, the municipality made new development plans for the area. As there was not enough free land in Tikkakoski, a plan was made to develop Puuppola or Lehesvuori into an urban area for 10,000 inhabitants. This was opposed by the village association of Puuppola, who believed that an urbanization plan similar to the one made for Kuokkala earlier was partially enforced by the town of Jyväskylä onto the rural municipality. The plan was never approved due to heavy opposition by locals; in a poll from the 1990s, 85% of respondents were also against a smaller plan for an urban area with a planned population of 5,000.

A new zoning plan was made in 2005, which would have expanded Palokka towards Lintukangas and closer to Puuppola by constructing 210 houses, intended for 800 new residents.

The municipality of Jyväskylän maalaiskunta was consolidated with the city of Jyväskylä in 2009. On 8 October 2009, Puuppola became one of Jyväskylä's official districts. In the 2010s, new houses in Puuppola have been built especially in the Tanttila and Ykshaukinen areas.

== Services ==
=== School ===
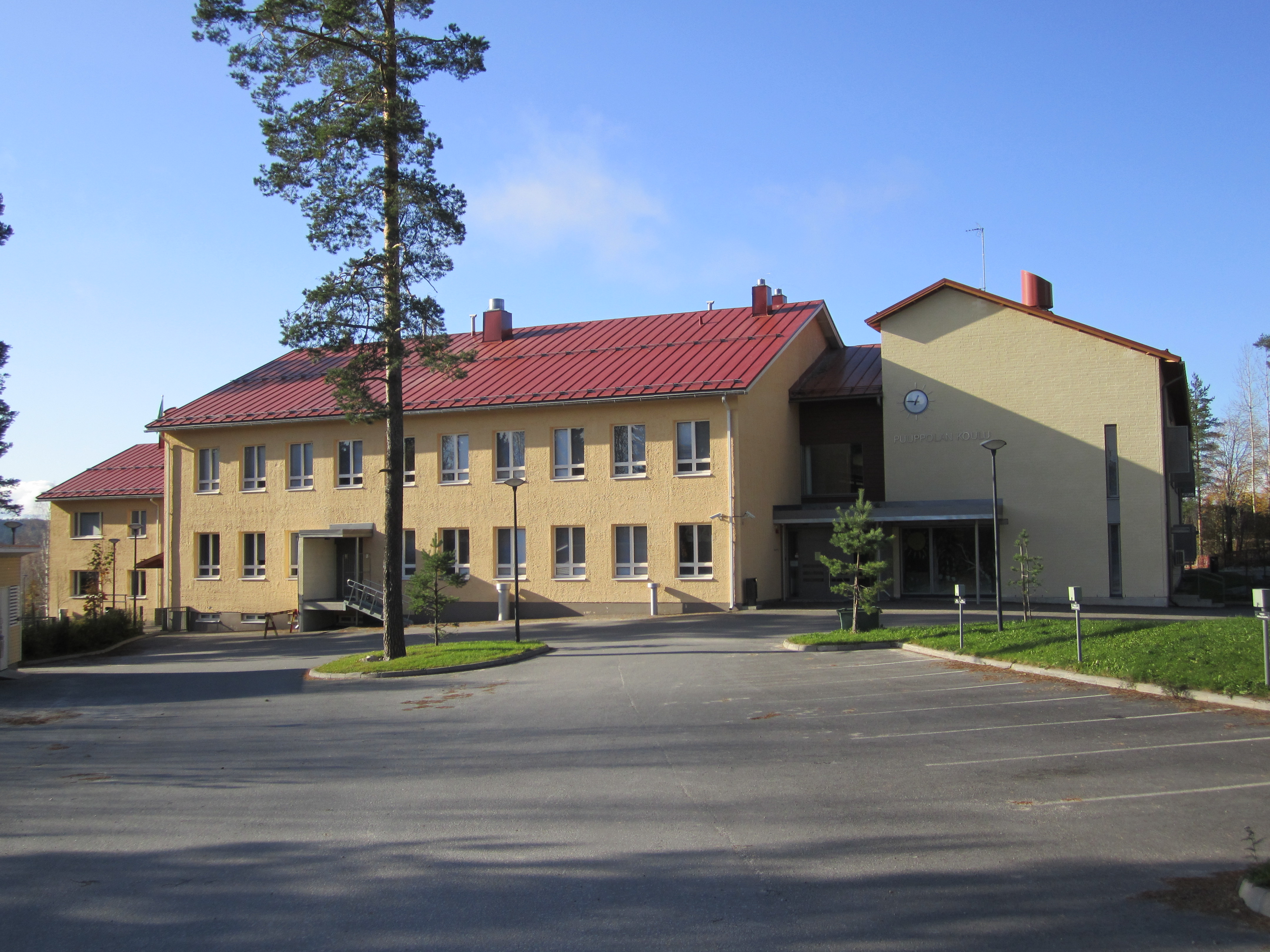
Puuppola school

There is a primary school for grades 1–6 in Puuppola. The school was established in 1890. Its current main building was built in 1957 and expanded between 2006 and 2007.

=== Commercial ===
There are no stores in Puuppola, as the last one, Puuppolan Rita, was closed in 2018. In the 1970s, there were three other stores: a branch of Osuuskauppa Keskimaa and one of Osuuskauppa Mäki-Matti, as well as the privately owned T:mi Manninen.

== Hydroelectric plant ==
There is a small (0.4 MW [540 hp]) hydroelectric plant on the lower Autiojoki river between the lakes Korttajärvi and Luonetjärvi. The river is one of Jyväskylä's longest rivers and has a drainage area of over 100 square kilometers (39 sq mi). It was built in 1964 to produce energy for the village. Since 2018, there have been plans to demolish it in order to restore the river to its natural state, especially to allow brown trout to reproduce in the area. The city of Jyväskylä purchased the plant in 2022.

== Notable people ==
- Tommi Mäkinen, former rally driver
- Eino Oksanen, marathon runner
