= Toivakka =

- Municipality
- Toivakan kunta Toivakka kommun
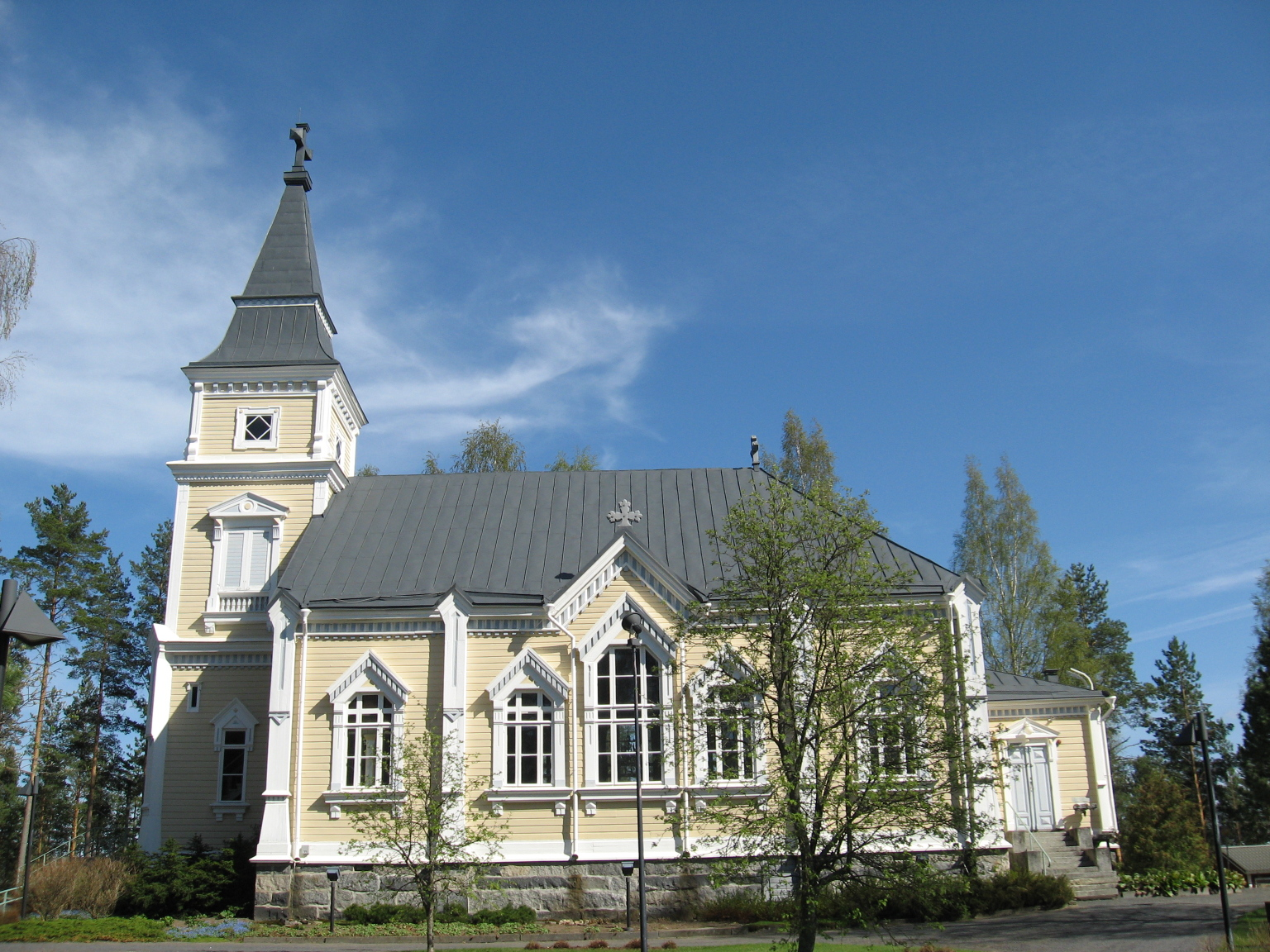
- Toivakka Church

- Coat of arms

- Location of Toivakka in Finland
- Interactive map of Toivakka
- Coordinates: 62°06′N 026°05′E
- Country: Finland
- Region: Central Finland
- Sub-region: Jyväskylä
- Charter: 1910

Government
  - Municipal manager: Touko Aalto

Area (2018-01-01)
  - Total: 413.94 km^{2} (159.82 sq mi)
  - Land: 361.46 km^{2} (139.56 sq mi)
  - Water: 52.44 km^{2} (20.25 sq mi)
  - Rank: 212th largest in Finland

Population (2025-12-31)
  - Total: 2,307
  - Rank: 241st largest in Finland
  - Density: 6.38/km^{2} (16.5/sq mi)

Population by native language
  - Finnish: 97.6% (official)
  - Others: 2.4%

Population by age
  - 0 to 14: 18.7%
  - 15 to 64: 53.1%
  - 65 or older: 28.2%
- Time zone: UTC+02:00 (EET)
  - Summer (DST): UTC+03:00 (EEST)
- Website: www.toivakka.fi/en/

Toivakka (Finnish: [ˈtoi̯vɑkːɑ]) is a municipality of Finland. It is located in the Central Finland region, near Jyväskylä. The municipality has a population of 2,307 (31 December 2025) and covers an area of 413.94 square kilometres (159.82 sq mi) of which 52.44 km^{2} (20.25 sq mi) is water. The population density is 6.38 inhabitants per square kilometre (16.5/sq mi). The municipality is unilingually Finnish.

The sower pictured in the coat of arms of Toivakka refers to agriculture but also to hope for the future. The coat of arms was designed by Gustaf von Numers and was confirmed for use on April 23, 1957.

== Geography ==
Neighbouring municipalities are Hankasalmi, Joutsa, Jyväskylä, Kangasniemi, Laukaa and Muurame.

There are altogether 82 lakes in Toivakka. The biggest lakes are Päijänne, Maunonen and Palosenjärvi.

The largest forest tree and the deepest inland water point in Finland are both located in Toivakka.

== History ==
A farm named Toivakka has existed since 1540. Its name is derived from the Savonian surname Toivakainen. It was a part of the village of Leppävesi in Laukaa, which was included in the Rautalampi parish after its establishment in 1561. Laukaa became an independent parish in 1628 and Toivakka remained a part of it until 1871, when it was transferred to Jyväskylän maalaiskunta, which was split off from Laukaa a few years earlier in 1868. Toivakka became a separate parish in 1909 and a municipality in 1910.

== Twinnings ==
- Kambja Parish, Estonia

== Gallery ==
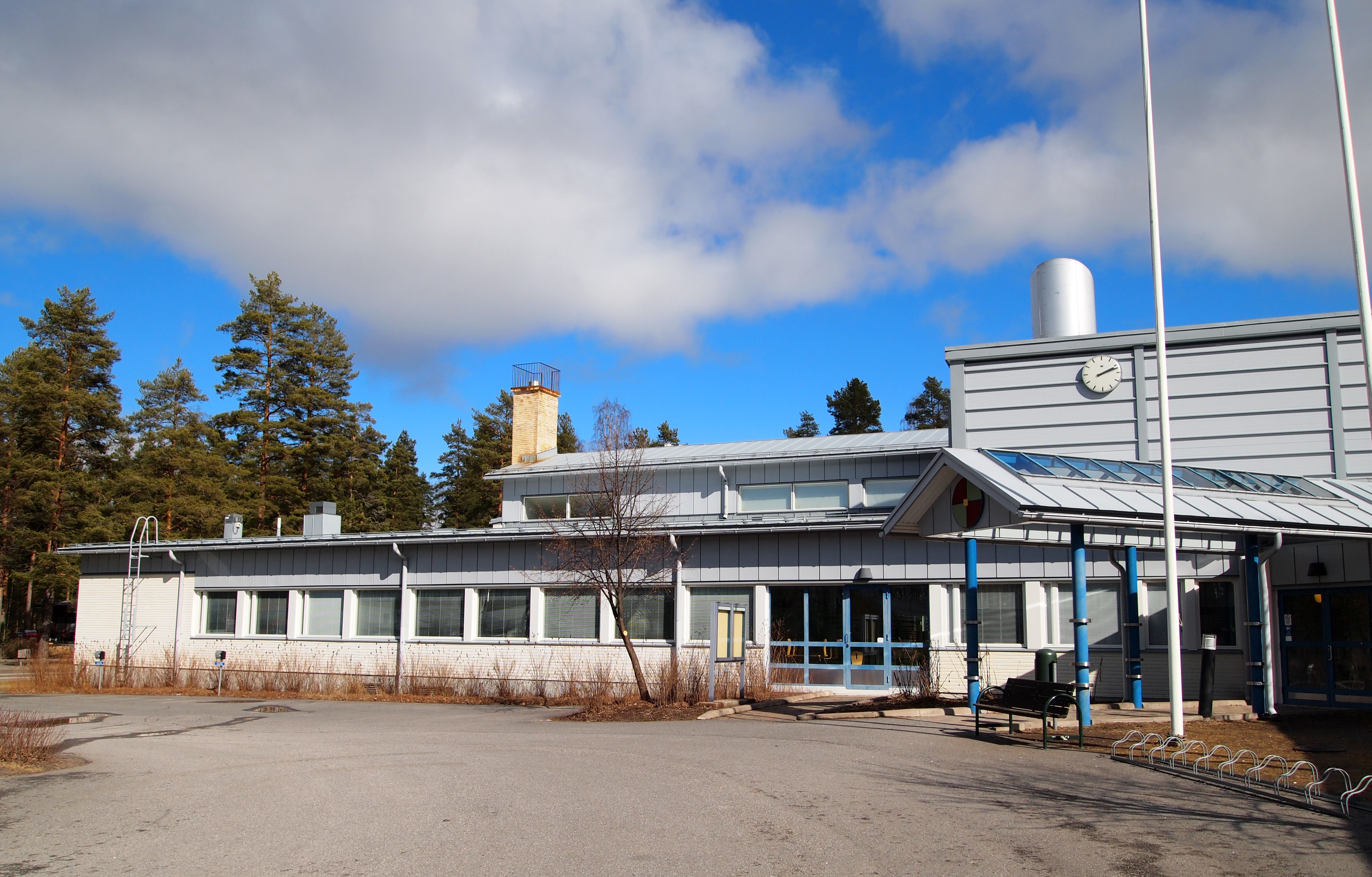
Toivakka school

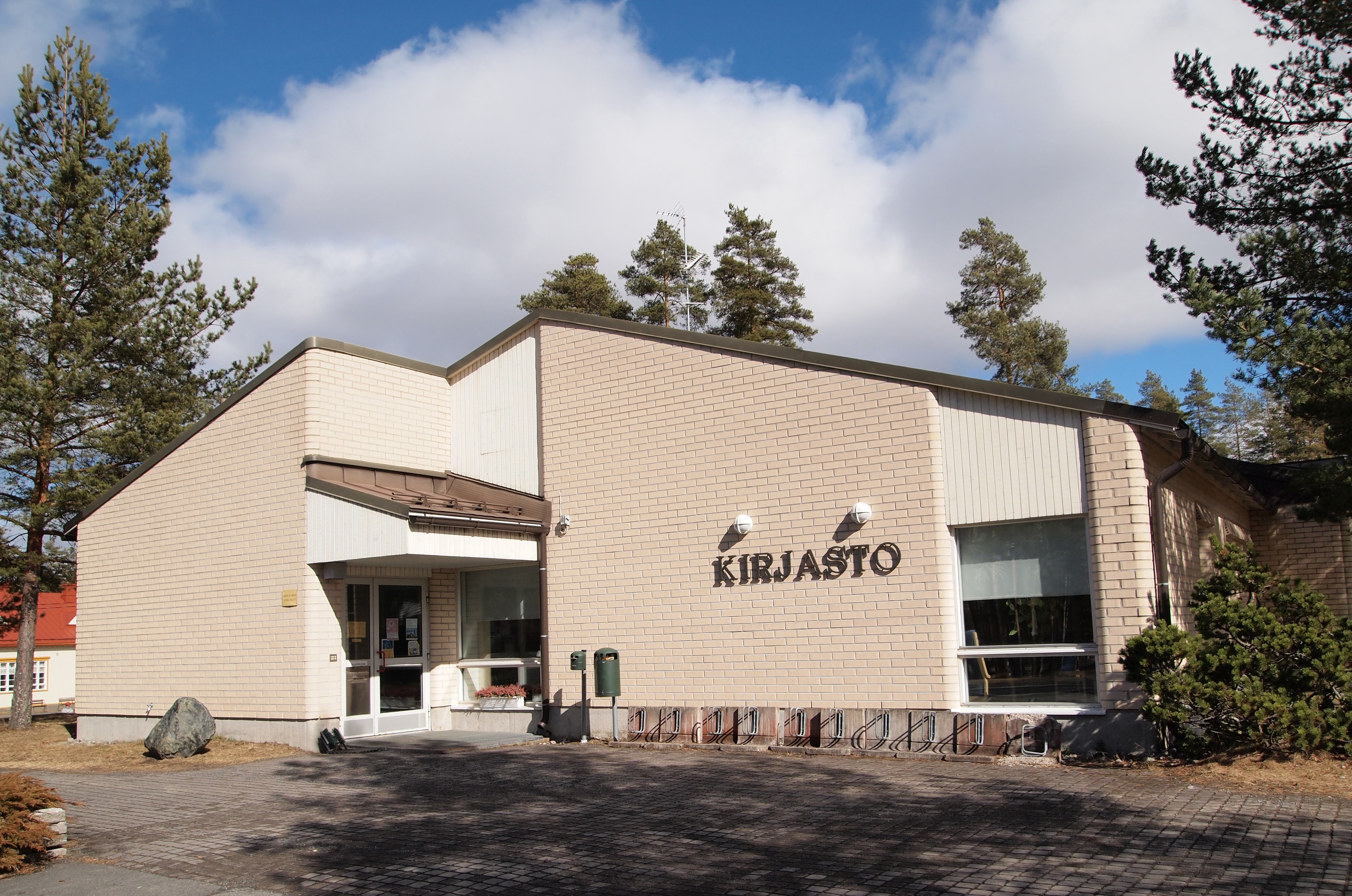
A library in Toivakka

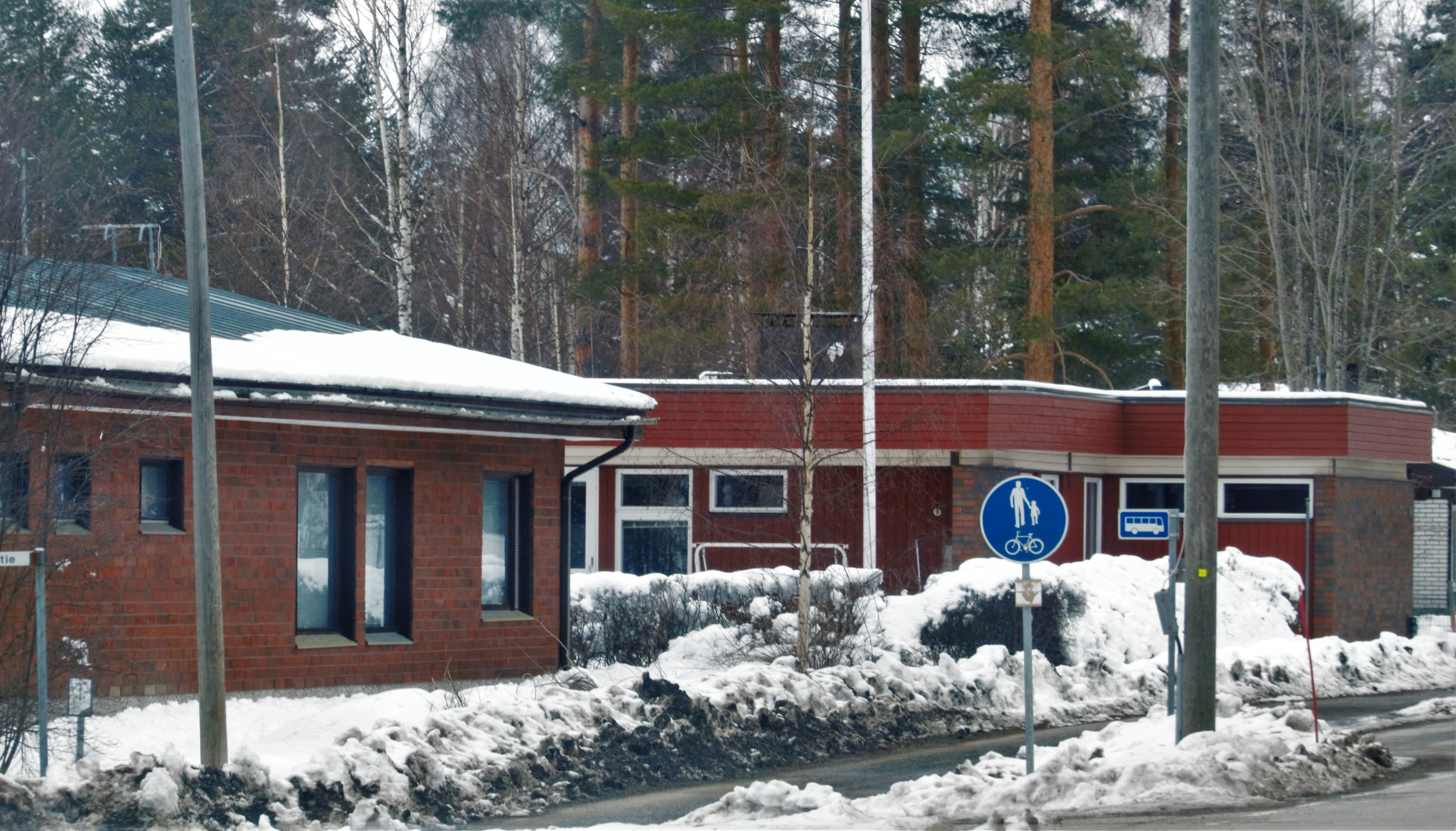
Houses in Toivakka
