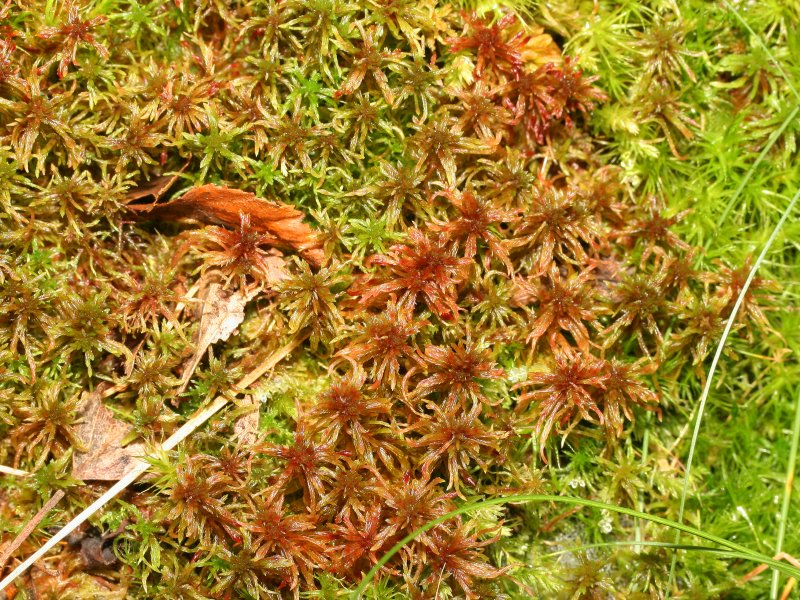

Scientific classification
- Kingdom: Plantae
- Division: Bryophyta
- Class: Sphagnopsida
- Order: Sphagnales
- Family: Sphagnaceae
- Genus: Sphagnum
- Species: S. warnstorfii

Binomial name
- Sphagnum warnstorfii Russow, 1888

= Sphagnum warnstorfii =

Species of moss

Sphagnum warnstorfii is a species of moss belonging to the family Sphagnaceae, named in honour of Carl Warnstorf. It is widely distributed in the north hemisphere.

In a study of the effect of the herbicide Asulam on moss growth, Sphagnum warnstorfii was shown to have intermediate sensitivity to Asulam exposure.

== Characteristics ==
This moss is noted as a medium-sized species, which forms soft carpets. It is most often a deep crimson colour, but can also appear in green, with the lower parts of the shoots showing as a blackish-red. The branch leaves form in straight lines, with straight and narrow tips.

== Habitat ==
Sphagnum warnstorfii appears in base-rich flushes, and is not found on nutrient-poor bogs. Its typically grows alongside Sphagnum teres and less occasionally with Sphagnum contortum.
