= Jyväskylä Airport =

Jyväskylä Airport Jyväskylän lentoasema

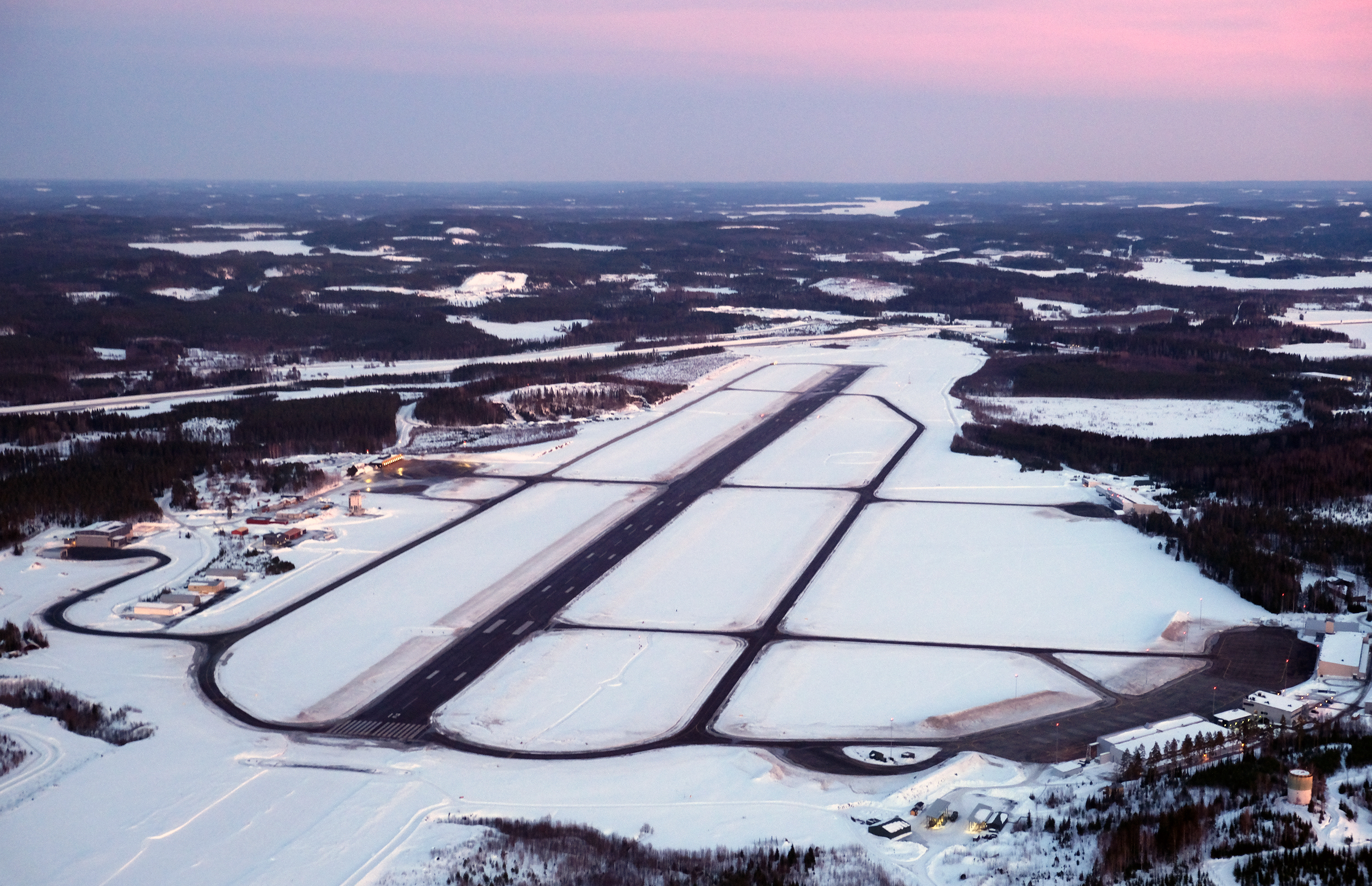
- IATA: JYV; ICAO: EFJY

Summary
- Airport type: Public
- Operator: Finavia
- Serves: Jyväskylä
- Location: Tikkakoski, Jyväskylä, Finland
- Elevation AMSL: 140 m (460 ft)
- Coordinates: 62°24′03″N 025°40′22″E
- Website: www.finavia.fi

Map
- Location within Finland

Runways
Direction	Length		Surface
Direction	m	ft	Surface
12/30	2,601	8,533	Asphalt

Statistics (2017)
- Passengers: 67,966
- Source: AIP Finland; Statistics from Finavia

Jyväskylä Airport (IATA: JYV, ICAO: EFJY; Finnish: Jyväskylän lentoasema) is an airport in Jyväskylä, Finland. It is in the center of the Finnish Lake District, about 20 kilometres (12 mi) north of the center of Jyväskylä. The airport terminal was renovated in the fall of 2004.

The Air Force Academy operations are stationed at the airport. The main campus of the Air Force Academy is about 5 kilometres (3 mi) from the airport. The Aviation Museum of Central Finland is near the airport.

== History ==
The airport was founded as an air-force base in 1939. The first commercial flight left the airport 6 years later in 1945.

On August 2, 2010, Finncomm Airlines announced it will stop its service between Helsinki and Jyväskylä on August 16, 2010. However the break was very short as Finnair and Finncomm reached an agreement in September 2010 that Finncomm will take over several Finnair's domestic routes. As a result of that, Finnair stopped its flights to Jyväskylä in late October 2010 and Finncomm started to operate those flights as co-operation with Finnair. On September 9, 2011, Finnair announced that they will end flights to Jyväskylä, the last flight would be on October 29, 2011. Finnair flights to Jyväskylä had been operated by Finncomm Airlines. Finnair has been responsible for ticket sales on the route, Finncomm being solely the operator. After the joint acquisition of Finncomm Airlines by Finnair and Flybe Nordic, it was announced that the link to Helsinki would be taken over by the new FlyBe Nordic on 30 October. The service between Helsinki and Jyväskylä was then operated by NyxAir until the spring of 2021, when it became non-operational; a new PSO tender re-enabled a twice-daily service which started operating October 31, 2022.

== Airlines and destinations ==
The following airlines operate regular scheduled and charter flights at Jyväskylä Airport:

Airlines	Destinations
Finnair	Helsinki

== Statistics ==
Annual passenger statistics for Jyväskylä Airport
Year	Domestic passengers	International passengers	Total passengers	Change
2005	140,187	9,811	149,998	−1.8% ▼
2006	135,223	14,099	149,322	−0.5% ▼
2007	125,476	13,465	138,941	−7.0% ▼
2008	112,831	15,787	128,618	−7.4% ▼
2009	92,144	12,045	104,189	−19.0% ▼
2010	74,982	13,626	88,608	−15.0% ▼
2011	75,131	13,719	88,850	0.3% ▲
2012	46,139	19,081	65,220	−26.6% ▼
2013	37,237	13,333	50,570	−22.5% ▼
2014	39,387	16,319	55,706	10.2% ▲
2015	51,761	10,083	61,844	11.0% ▲
2016	51,603	10,845	62,448	1.0% ▲
2017	56,814	11,152	67,966	8.8% ▲
2018	59,512	12,567	72,079	6.1% ▲
2019	57,027	9,545	66,572	−7.6% ▼
2020	10,502	88	10,590	−84.1% ▼
2021	2,220	2,372	4,592	−56.6% ▼
2022	3,407	7,573	10,980	139.1% ▲
2023	21,869	1,623	23,492	114.0% ▲
2024	22,799	2,966	25,765	9.7% ▲
2025	25,511	2,810	28,321	9.9% ▲

== Ground transport ==
There are no public transit connection directly to the passenger terminal. A car rental service is available. Taxi is available upon request. Bus-line number 22 goes from a nearby town to downtown Jyväskylä.

== See also ==
- List of the largest airports in the Nordic countries
