= Korttajärvi =

Lake in Jyväskylä, Finland

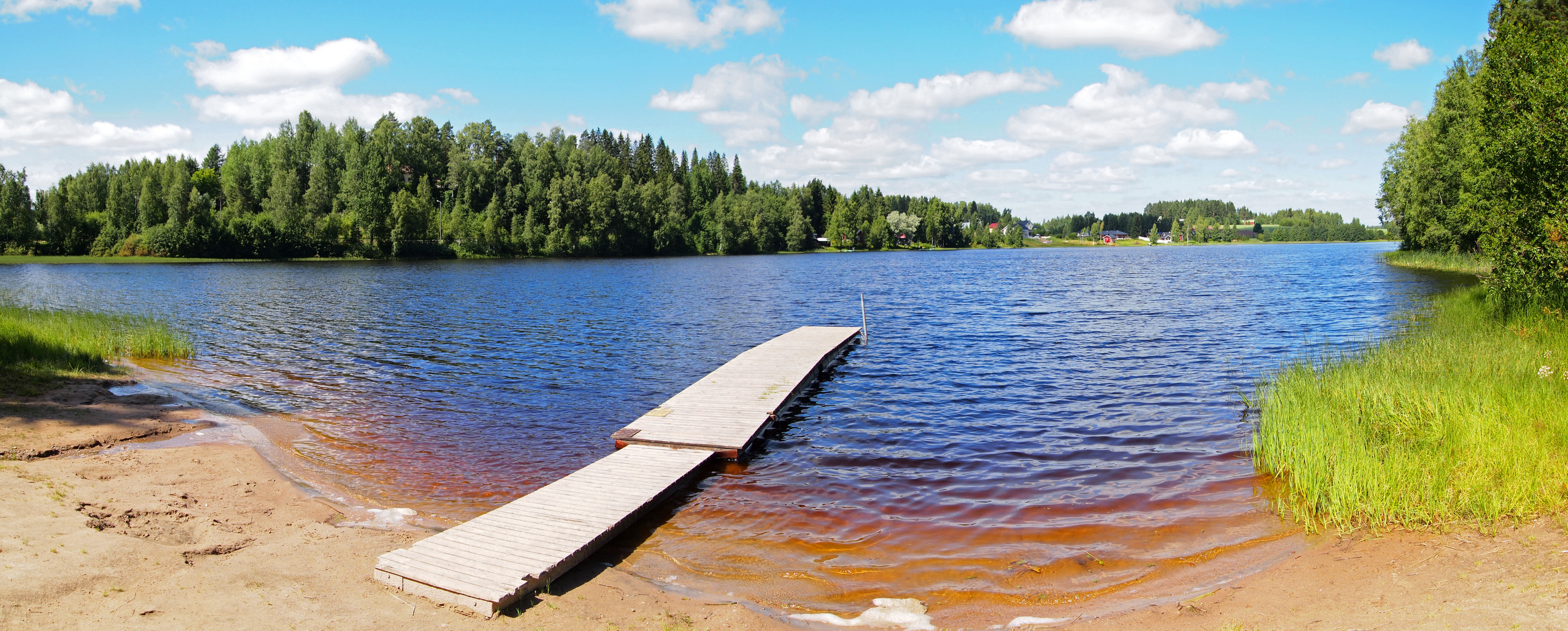

- Location within Finland
- Location: Jyväskylä
- Coordinates: 62°20′10″N 25°41′20″E
- Basin countries: Finland
- Max. length: 1.8 kilometres (1.1 mi)
- Max. width: 650 metres (2,130 ft)
- Surface area: 0.4412 km^{2} (0.1703 sq mi)
- Average depth: 10.2 metres (33 ft)
- Max. depth: 12.5 metres (41 ft)
- Shore length^{1}: 4.5 kilometres (2.8 mi)
- ^{1} Shore length is not a well-defined measure.

Korttajärvi is a lake located in Puuppola, a village in the municipality of Jyväskylä in Central Finland.

== Features of the lake ==
The 0.44 km² lake is 1.8 kilometers long and around 650 meters wide. It has a long narrow shape and only the middle part of the lake is as wide as stated. The slopes of Laahanmäki rise from the southern Coast of the lake. The hill rises to a height of 45 meters. According to the map, there are no islands in the lake. It has been created and the depth maps have been published. It has two depressions where the southern end of the lake is 12.5 meters deep and the central part is 10.2 meters deep. The length of the lake's shoreline is 4.5 kilometers and its shores are partly arable and forest land. The population around the lake is scattered in Puuppola, but there are also denser residential areas in the catchment area. On the east side of the lake, it is passed by highway 4, which branches off from the village roads that go around the lake. They are connecting road 16709 and regional road 630, as well as the village road crossing Sakarinmäki and Laahanmäki in the south. There is a beach at the southern end of the lake.
