= Hanhiperä =

District of Jyväskylä, Finland

- District of Jyväskylä
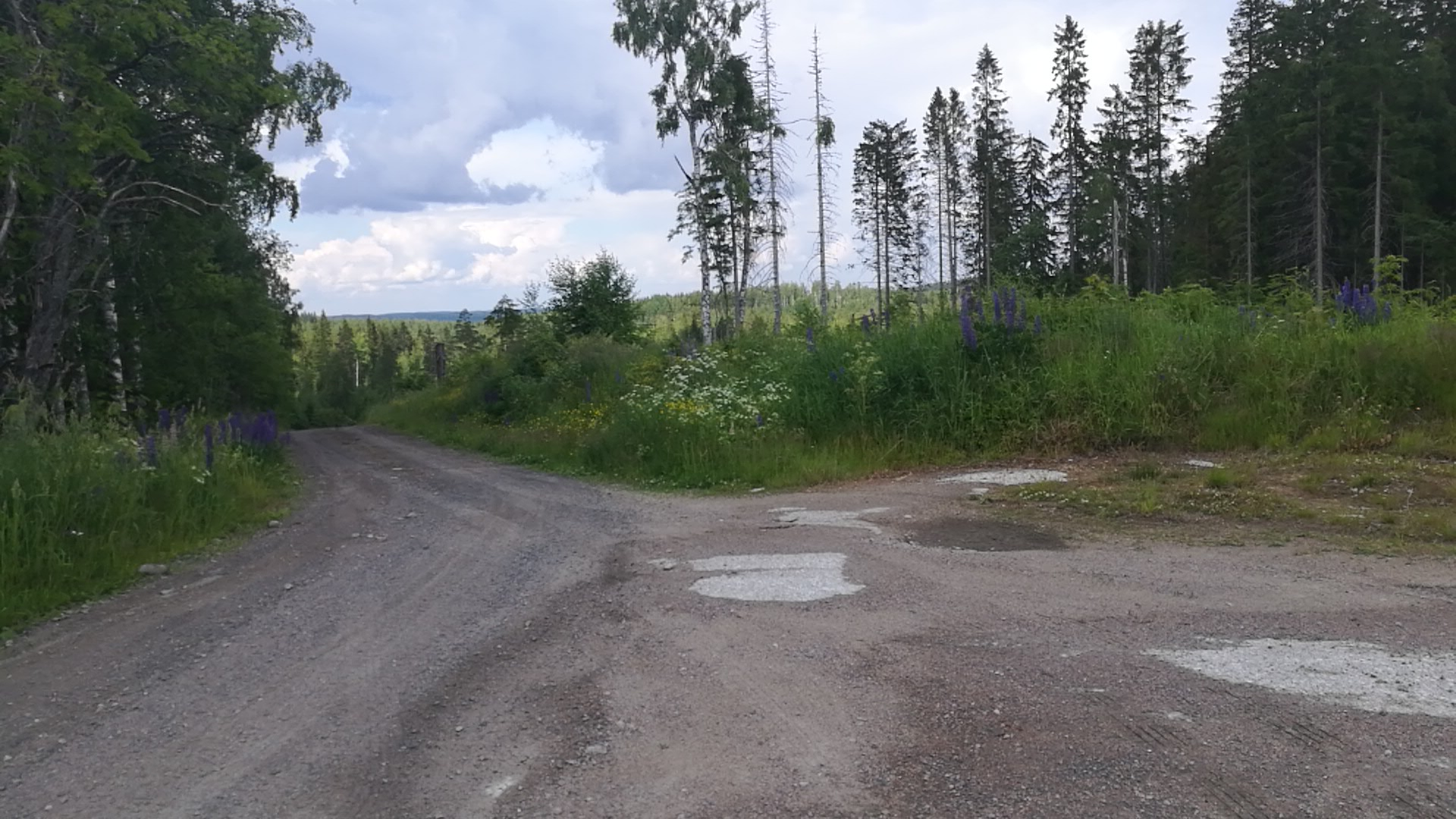
- The road Hanhiperäntie and the start of its branch Hanhinotkontie

- Location in Central Finland
- Coordinates: 62.2298°N 25.6214°E
- Country: Finland
- Region: Central Finland
- Sub-region: Jyväskylä sub-region
- City: Jyväskylä
- Ward: Keltinmäki-Myllyjärvi

Population (2021-12-31)
  - Total: 6
- Time zone: UTC+2 (EET)
  - Summer (DST): UTC+3 (EEST)

Hanhiperä is a district and a statistical area of Jyväskylä, Finland. It is a remote part of Jyväskylä with only a few houses and only 6 permanent inhabitants as of 2021.

The district of Hanhiperä borders Valkeamäki in the north, Keltinmäki in the east, Taka-Keljo in the south and Vesanka in the west. It also has a small border with the municipality of Muurame in the west. The main road of Hanhiperä and Valkeamäki is Hanhiperäntie, which leads to the road 6015 (Vesangantie), in turn connecting Hanhiperä to central Jyväskylä and the national road 18/23.

== Geography ==
Hanhiperä is a relatively high area, with multiple hills reaching 200 m. Pirttimäki, the highest hill (249 m) in Jyväskylä proper (i.e. not including Korpilahti) is mainly within the Taka-Keljo district, though its northern side extends into the Hanhiperä district. A skiing and hiking path maintained by the town of Jyväskylä passes through Hanhiperä.

Hanhiperä is traditionally a part of the village of Keljo, more specifically Taka-Keljo. The term Hanhiperä traditionally referred to the entire northwestern corner of Keljo around the lake Hanhijärvi, including the Perälä settlement. The modern Valkeamäki area was also seen as a part of the area, even though officially it was part of the register village of Jyväskylä.

=== Lakes ===
There are three lakes partially within the official district of Hanhiperä: Hanhijärvi, Soidenlampi and Salmijärvi. The river Hanhioja begins from the Hanhijärvi and discharges into the Ruokepuolinen near Ruoke. The river is located in a valley called Hanhinotko.

== History ==
Hanhiperä was most likely named after the lake Hanhijärvi, which translates to "goose lake". The name may have been given by hunters who exploited the vicinity of the lake.

Hanhiperä was uninhabited hinterland of Keljo until the 19th century, when the first farms in the area were established during the Great Partition. The first farm to be established was Pirttimäki, which was separated from Sysmälä(inen), one of the oldest farms in Keljo, in 1805. This was followed by the establishment of Hanhikangas and Hanhimäki in 1815. Newer farms were established as tenure farms or as divisions of the original farms; for example, Hanhimäki was eventually divided into Lintula, Hanhiaho (Hanhela), Ylä-Hanhimäki, Hanhinotko, Koivula, Ahola and Välilä.

Hanhiperä was transferred from Jyväskylän maalaiskunta to the town of Jyväskylä in 1965 along with most other parts of Keljo. The area of Perälä still remained part of Jyväskylän mlk. The development of Perälä (formerly also Sulkaperä) into a distinct residential area began in the late 1980s. The settlement also extends into Vesanka and Muurame.

Since 2005, there have been plans to build a residential area in nearby Valkeamäki. The plan was accepted by the municipal government of Jyväskylä in 2012. The residential area is planned to provide housing for approximately 8,000 people, which may increase if the construction is extended towards Hanhiperä. The project has been opposed due to its potential effects on the local nature, especially since Siberian flying squirrels, which are endangered in Finland, live in the area.

As of 2023, five houses remain in Hanhiperä, with only one of them still having fields.

== Livelihoods and services ==
Agriculture and livestock were the traditional source of income in Taka-Keljo until the nationwide post-World War economic restructuring. Despite this, the Hanhikangas farm still owned a large cattle herd as late as the 1990s, the farm being one of two milk producers within the town of Jyväskylä at that time, the other one being Sulkula in Keljonkangas.

Hanhiperä also had a minor role in tar production between the 1940s and the 1950s, as resinous wood was felled in Hanhiperä, transported to Ruoke through the Hanhinotko valley and from there taken to the tar factory at Kuohu. Logging operations were also conducted in the area around the same time.

=== Education ===
Hanhiperä never had a school of its own, instead children from the area attended the nearby Taka-Keljo school, which was established in 1931 and closed in 1967. Nowadays the area is part of the Keltinmäki school district.
