= Ruoke =

- District of Jyväskylä
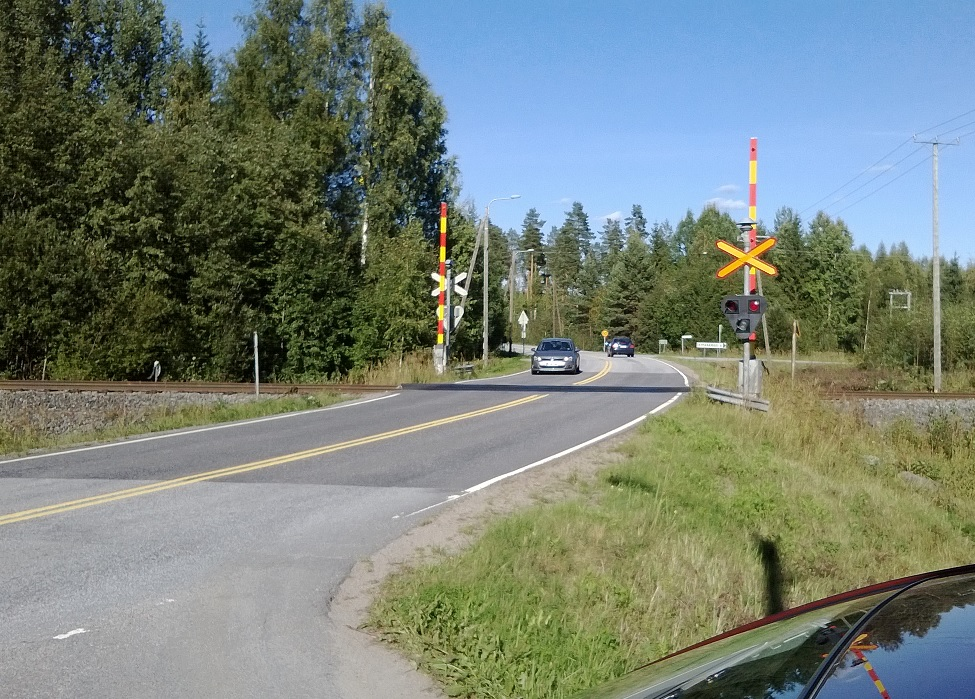

- Location in Central Finland
- Coordinates: 62.2591°N 25.6233°E
- Country: Finland
- Region: Central Finland
- Sub-region: Jyväskylä sub-region
- City: Jyväskylä
- Ward: Kuohu-Vesanka

Population (2021-12-31)
  - Total: 204 (Note: Only including the official statistical area of Ruoke, i.e. the part of Ruoke transferred to the town in 1965.)
- Time zone: UTC+2 (EET)
  - Summer (DST): UTC+3 (EEST)

Ruoke (Note: Finnish pronunciation: [ˈruo̞ke̞ʔ]) is a residential area and a district of Jyväskylä, Finland. It is a settlement and a former stop by the Jyväskylä-Haapamäki railway. The distance to central Jyväskylä is approximately 8 kilometres (5.0 mi).

Ruoke may be seen as a separate village, though it was not a register village (an official village), instead being on the border of three historical register villages: Jyväskylä, Vesanka and Palokka. Register villages were officially abolished in 2014.

== Geography ==
=== Boundaries ===
The official district (kaupunginosa, an area for local development) and statistical area of Ruoke only include the portion within the village of Jyväskylä. The district is bigger than the statistical area, as it also includes the northern part of the Killeri statistical area. The district borders Rippalanmäki in the north, Kortepohja in the east, Kypärämäki in the southeast, Valkeamäki in the south and Vesanka in the west.

=== Lakes ===
Ruoke is located on the northern shore of lake Ruokepuolinen (or Ruoketpuolinen). The settlement of Ruoke is named after this lake, though the origin of the ruoke- element is unclear. It may have been derived from ruoko ("reed"), the verb ruokkia ("to feed") or from the dialectal word ruokkeet ("trousers"). The river flowing from the Ruokepuolinen to the Lummelampi was a natural border of the village of Jyväskylä, as well as a border between the town of Jyväskylä and Jyväskylän maalaiskunta from 1965 to 31 December 2008. Jyväskylän maalaiskunta was consolidated with Jyväskylä on 1 January 2009. The source of the river has been a border since the 16th century, when it acted as one between hunting grounds. A small stream flows from the Lummelampi and merges with the Koskelanoja river in Rippalanmäki, which flows into the Myllyjärvi. The river Syväoja begins from the Myllyjärvi and discharges into the Tuomiojärvi.

== History ==
Modern Ruoke was originally a border area of Jyväskylä, Vesanka and Palokka. In the 19th century, the lands under the village of Jyväskylä were owned by the Nisula and Haukkala farms, the lands under Vesanka by the Yrjölä, Ristola, Halila and Ylä-Siekkilä farms, while the lands under Palokka were owned by the Niemelä and Kankaanpää farms. The smaller farms in the area, such as Siltala, Rinteelä, Papinkorpi and Majamäki, were separated from the older, larger farms. The first farm in the area was Rantala, which was established as a tenure farm of Haukkala in 1861.

The area was originally simply called Siltalan perä after the Siltala farm. The Möykynmäki tunnel was finished in 1926 and the railroad passing through the area was relocated to its current site soon after. The path of the old railroad was repurposed into a highway. The railway stop was named Ruoke after the lake Ruokepuolinen after the name was suggested by Ahti Lahtinen and Aukusti Salo. The name soon spread to the entire settlement. In the 1940s, the railway stop at Ruoke was the second busiest along the railroad, only surpassed by the Keuruu station.

Logging in the area began after the railroad was finished. Wood was transported with horses from the Hanhinotko valley and across the lake Ruokepuolinen to the railway stop. Until the 1950s, resinous wood was felled in Laajavuori and Hanhiperä and transported to the tar factory in Kuohu to the west of Vesanka.

The river between the Ruokepuolinen and Lummelampi became a municipal border in 1965, as the area to its south and east (the modern official Ruoke district) was transferred to the town of Jyväskylä. The parts of Ruoke under Vesanka and Palokka were still part of Jyväskylän maalaiskunta until the municipality was disestablished in 2009. Since the 1970s, there had been plans to build more houses by the roads of Ruoke and Vesanka in order to make the built-up area of Vesanka denser and more akin to Tikkakoski. Ruoke and Vesanka were zoned in the 1990s.

== Residential concentrations ==
The population of Ruoke increased significantly in the late 1940s after electricity and postal services became available. The first detached houses along the Ruokkeentie between Ruoke and Palokka were built in the 1950s. This was followed by the houses along the roads Hiekkaharjuntie and Timolantie in the 1960s. By 2003, there were approximately 40 houses on the town's side of Ruoke. This area is still being expanded today, as the most recent expansion to the urban plan of Ruoke was approved in 2020.

=== Kylmäoja ===
Kylmäoja is a small residential area around the road Kylmäojantie, a branch of the Ruokkeentie near the highway 18. The first house in the area was the Kiertokangas farm, established in the 1920s by Juho and Ida Ketonen from Längelmäki. Most houses in the area were built in the 1950s.

== Services ==
=== Public transport ===
The bus lines 37 and 39 operated by Jyväskylän liikenne stop in Ruoke.

=== Commercial ===
The first shop in Ruoke was established in the 1920s and was operated by the Tyynelä farm. Nowadays there are no stores in Ruoke, the closest ones are in Savela and Keltinmäki.
