= Köhniönjärvi =

Lake in Jyväskylä

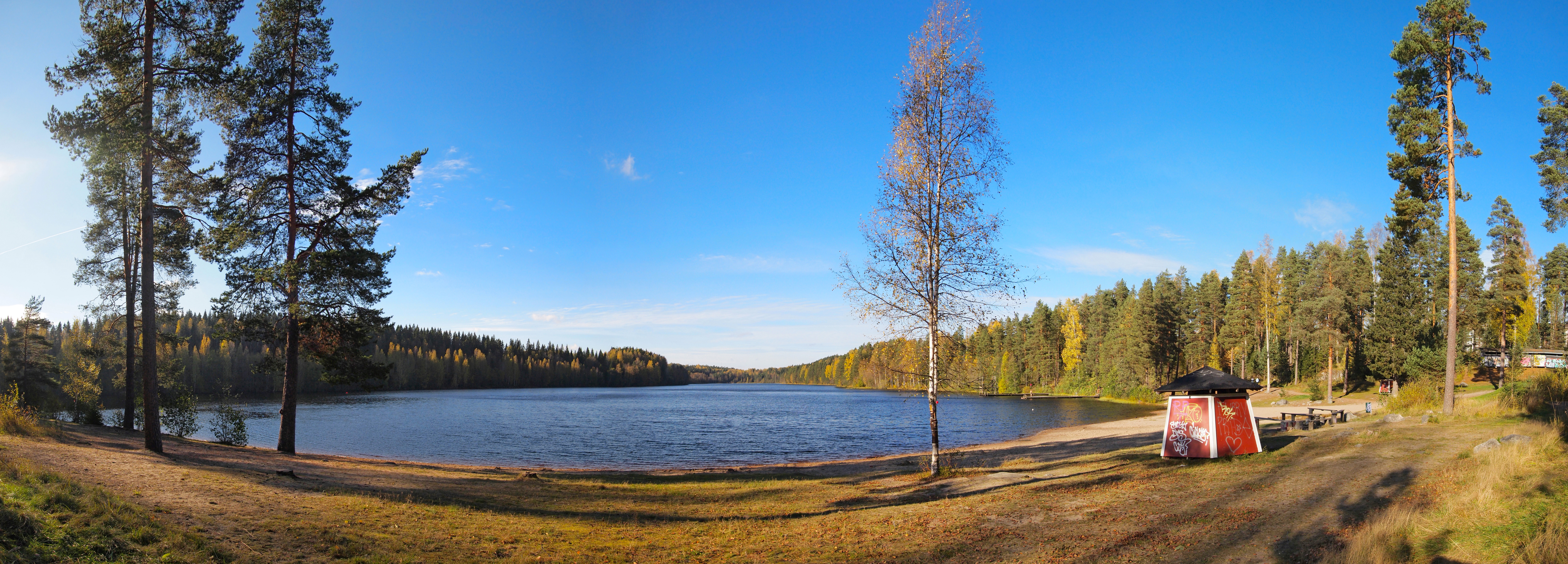
- View from the Köhniö beach
- Interactive map of Köhniönjärvi
- Location: Jyväskylä
- Coordinates: 62.243°N 25.666°E
- Primary outflows: Köyhänoja
- Basin countries: Finland
- Surface area: 28.764 ha (71.08 acres)
- Average depth: 6.7 m (22 ft)
- Max. depth: 18 m (59 ft)
- Shore length^{1}: 3.301 km (2.051 mi)
- Surface elevation: 126.1 m (414 ft)
- Islands: none
- ^{1} Shore length is not a well-defined measure.

Köhniönjärvi (Finnish pronunciation: [ˈkøhniønˌjærʋi]) is a lake in the Kypärämäki district of Jyväskylä, Finland, covering an area of 29 hectares (72 acres). The residential area of Köhniö is located to its east, though it does not extend to its shores. The Haapamäki–Jyväskylä railroad passes by the lake's southern shore.

The lake's average depth is 6.7 metres (22 ft) and its maximum depth is 18 metres (59 ft), the deepest point is located in its southeastern part. The surface level of the lake is 126 metres (413 ft) above sea level.

== Geography ==
Köhniönjärvi is located in the Kymijoki main basin and is part of its second-order Päijänne basin (Suur-Päijänteen alue). The catchment area of Köhniönjärvi itself covers an area of 12.2 square kilometres (4.7 sq mi), of which 66% is dense forest, 9.1% is sparse forest, 3.9% is water and 0.2% is wetland. The rest of the area is residential or industrial. The catchment area extends to the southern slopes of the hill Laajavuori in the north and to the settlement of Taka-Keljo in the south, also covering much of the Kypärämäki and Keltinmäki districts.

There are multiple smaller lakes or ponds within the catchment area, including Soidenlampi, Mustalampi and Kotalampi in the south as well as Rimminlampi, Killervä and Riihilampi in the north. Köhniönjärvi itself discharges into the Jyväsjärvi via the 3.8-kilometre (2.4 mi) long Köyhänoja, which follows the Haapamäki–Jyväskylä railroad for much of its course, also passing through the residential areas of Tarhamäki and Kukkumäki.

== Environmental values ==
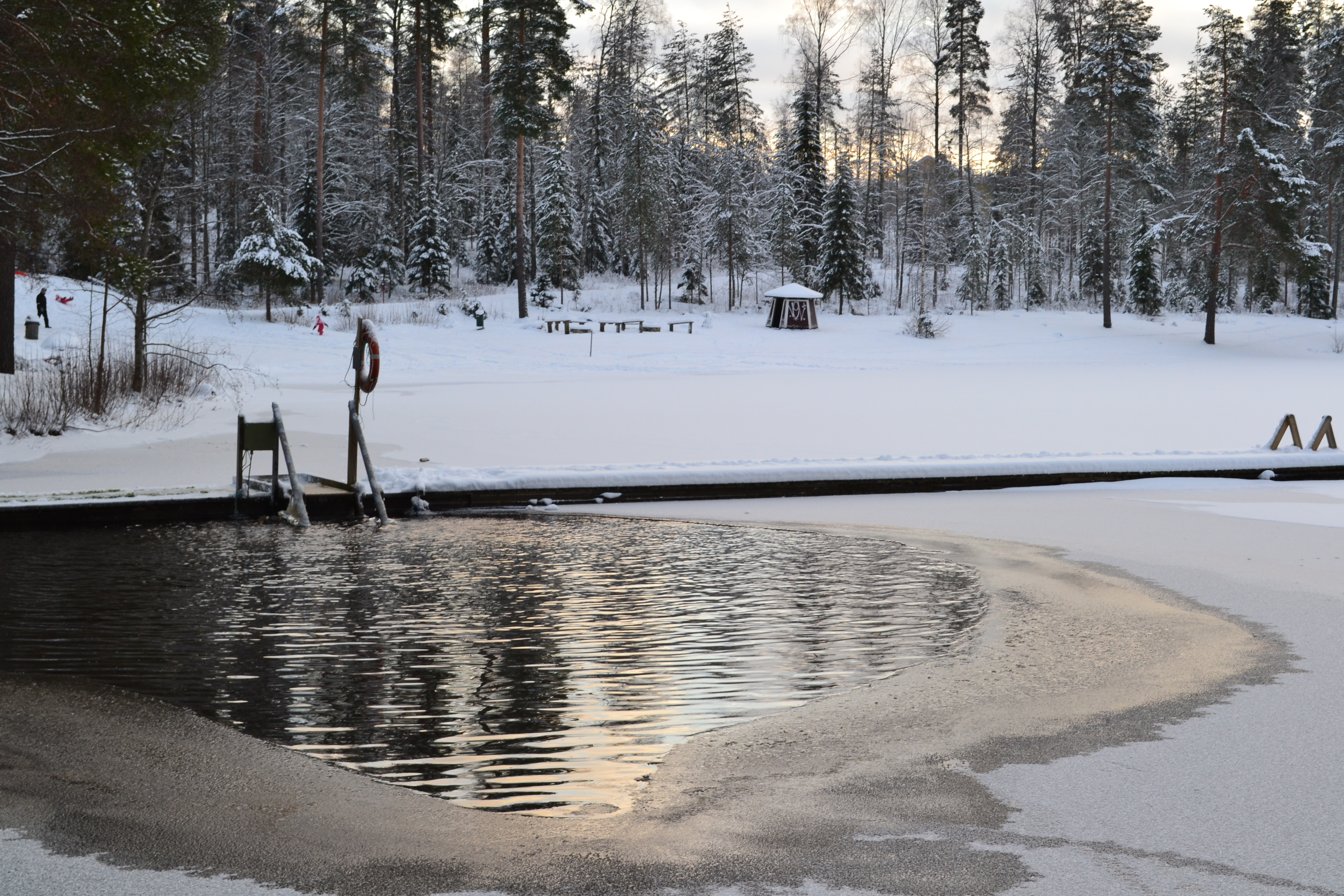
Köhniönjärvi in the winter

=== Water quality ===
There is a public beach maintained by the town on the eastern shore of the lake, making water sampling necessary. The water of the Köhniönjärvi is rich in nutrients; based on samples taken from a metre below surface level in October 2019, the water of the lake had a nitrogen level of 630 μg/l and a phosphorus level of 15 μg/l. Due to high nutrient levels and the small size of the lake causing its water to warm up quickly, cyanobacteria is found almost every summer, however generally not to an extent where swimming would be unsafe. E. coli and Enterococcus bacteria levels have also remained low between 2019 and 2022 and the water has been deemed safe for swimming. There have been some exceptions, such as a norovirus contamination for a brief period in 2022.

=== Shores ===
The southern shores of the lake are covered by relatively old spruce-dominated forest, providing habitat for Siberian flying squirrels, which are endangered in Finland. Notable plants found in the area include Platanthera bifolia and Goodyera repens.
