= Districts of Jyväskylä =

The city of Jyväskylä, Finland is divided into 86 districts (Finnish: kaupunginosat) and 14 statistical wards (Finnish: suuralueet, Swedish: storområden).

== Wards of Jyväskylä ==
This is a list of the 14 wards of Jyväskylä by population as of June 2012

#	Ward	Population
1	Kantakaupunki (city centre)	25.914
2	Kuokkala	17.270
3	Palokka-Puuppola	14.816
4	Vaajakoski-Jyskä	14.796
5	Kypärämäki-Kortepohja	10.839
6	Huhtasuo	8.788
7	Keltinmäki-Myllyjärvi	7.634
8	Keljo	5.752
9	Halssila	5.547
10	Tikkakoski-Nyrölä	5.508
11	Korpilahti	5.042
12	Lohikoski-Seppälänkangas	4.639
13	Säynätsalo	3.340
14	Kuohu-Vesanka	2.177

== Districts of Jyväskylä ==
This is a list of the districts in the official order.

- 1. Keskusta
- 2. Harju
- 3. Puistola
- 4. Lutakko
- 5. Mattilanpelto
- 6. Mäki-Matti
- 7. Kypärämäki
- 8. Savela
- 9. Kukkumäki
- 10. Keljo
- 11. Nisula
- 12. Taulumäki
- 13. Lohikoski
- 14. Tourula
- 15. Kangasvuori
- 16. Halssila
- 17. Kortepohja
- 18. Keltinmäki
- 19. Seppälänkangas
- 20. Huhtasuo
- 21. Keljonkangas
- 22. Ristonmaa
- 23. Kuokkala
- 24. Kuokkalanpelto
- 25. Ristikivi
- 26. Nenäinniemi
- 27. Hämeenlahti
- 28. Sääksvuori
- 29. Mannila
- 30. Etelä-Keljo
- 31. Säynätsalo
- 32. Lehtisaari
- 33. Muuratsalo
- 34. Kinkovuori
- 35. Taka-Keljo
- 36. Hanhiperä
- 37. Valkeamäki
- 38. Ruoke
- 39. Reserved
- 40. Reserved
- 41. Palokka
- 42. Mannisenmäki
- 43. Rippalanmäki
- 44. Haukkamäki
- 45. Kirri
- 46. Heikkilä
- 47. Pappilanvuori
- 48. Tyyppälä
- 49. Hiekkapohja
- 50. Matinmäki
- 51. Jylhänperä
- 52. Puuppola
- 53. Saarenmaa
- 54. Vesanka
- 55. Kuohu
- 56. Varsalanperä
- 57. Vertaala
- 58. Nyrölä
- 59. Reserved
- 60. Kuikka
- 61. Tikkamannila
- 62. Tikkakoski
- 63. Kuukanpää
- 64. Ankeriasjärvi
- 65. Sulunperä
- 66. Jyskä
- 67. Väinölä
- 68. Haapaniemi
- 69. Vaajakoski
- 70. Kaunisharju
- 71. Tölskä
- 72. Kanavuori
- 73. Hupeli
- 74. Laajaranta
- 75. Oravasaari
- 76. Pohjola
- 77. Pitkäjärvi
- 78. Leppälahti
- 79. Mehtovuori
- 80. Kirkonmäki
- 81. Ikolanmäki
- 82. Iloniemi
- 83. Kemppaisenmäki
- 84. Kotamäki
- 85. Tähtiniemi
- 86. Korpiaho-Heinosniemi
- 87. Tikkala
- 88. Hirvimäki-Puolakka
- 89. Vespuoli
