= Kuohu =

- District of Jyväskylä
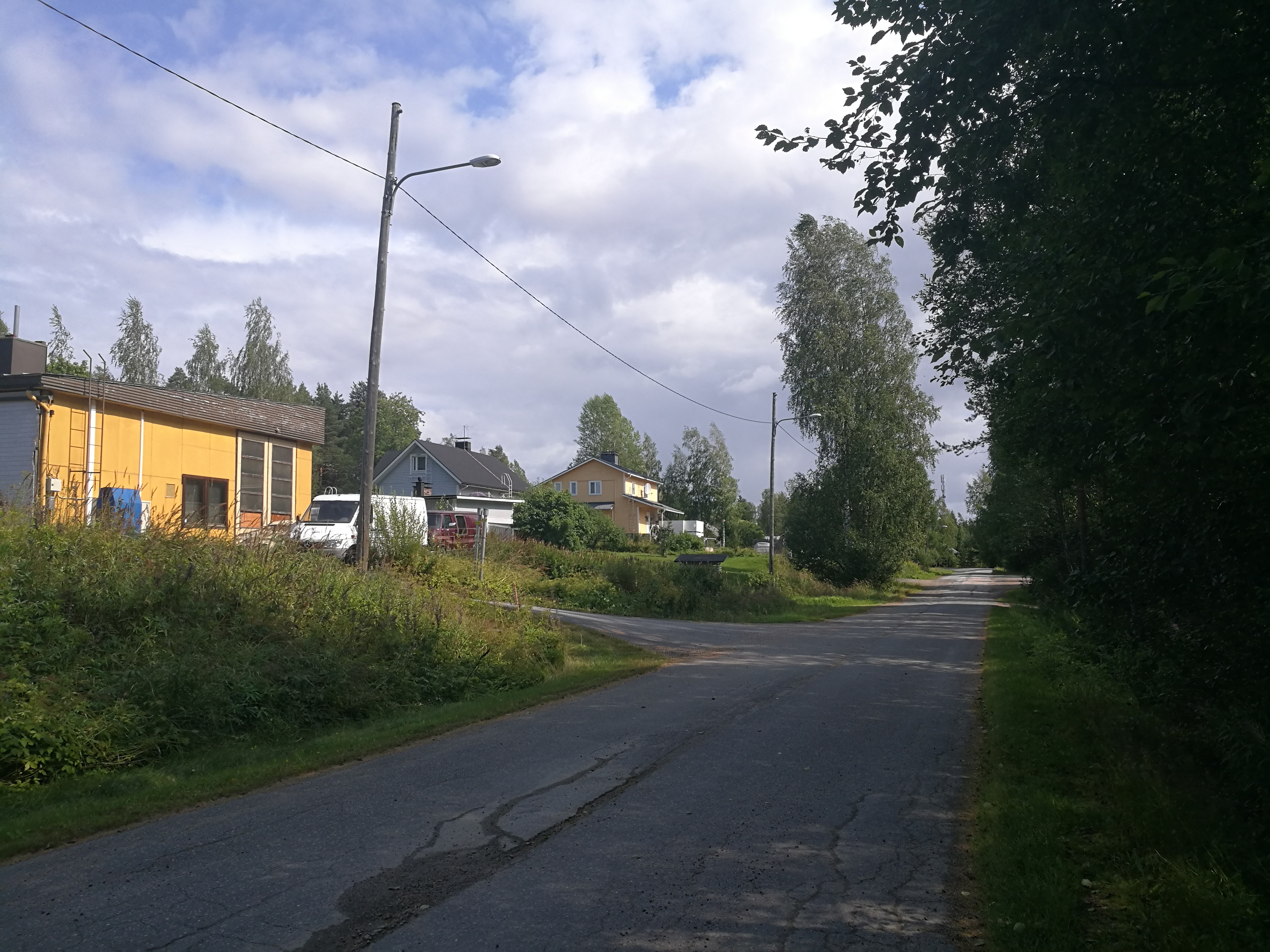
- Houses along the Kuohunraitti street.

- Location in Central Finland Kuohu (Finland)
- Coordinates: 62.265°N 25.450°E
- Country: Finland
- Region: Central Finland
- Sub-region: Jyväskylä sub-region
- City: Jyväskylä
- Ward: Kuohu-Vesanka

Population (2023), urban area
  - Total: 372
  - Density: 184.2/km^{2} (477/sq mi)
- Time zone: UTC+2 (EET)
  - Summer (DST): UTC+3 (EEST)

Kuohu (Finnish pronunciation: [ˈkuo̞ɦu]) is a village, urban area and district of Jyväskylä, Finland, located in the western part of the city near the border with Petäjävesi. Before 2009, it was part of Jyväskylän maalaiskunta. The Finnish national road 18/23 and the Haapamäki–Jyväskylä railway pass through Kuohu.

The urban area, as defined by Statistics Finland, had a population of 372 on 31 December 2023. The official district of the city does not correspond to this definition.

== Geography ==
=== General ===
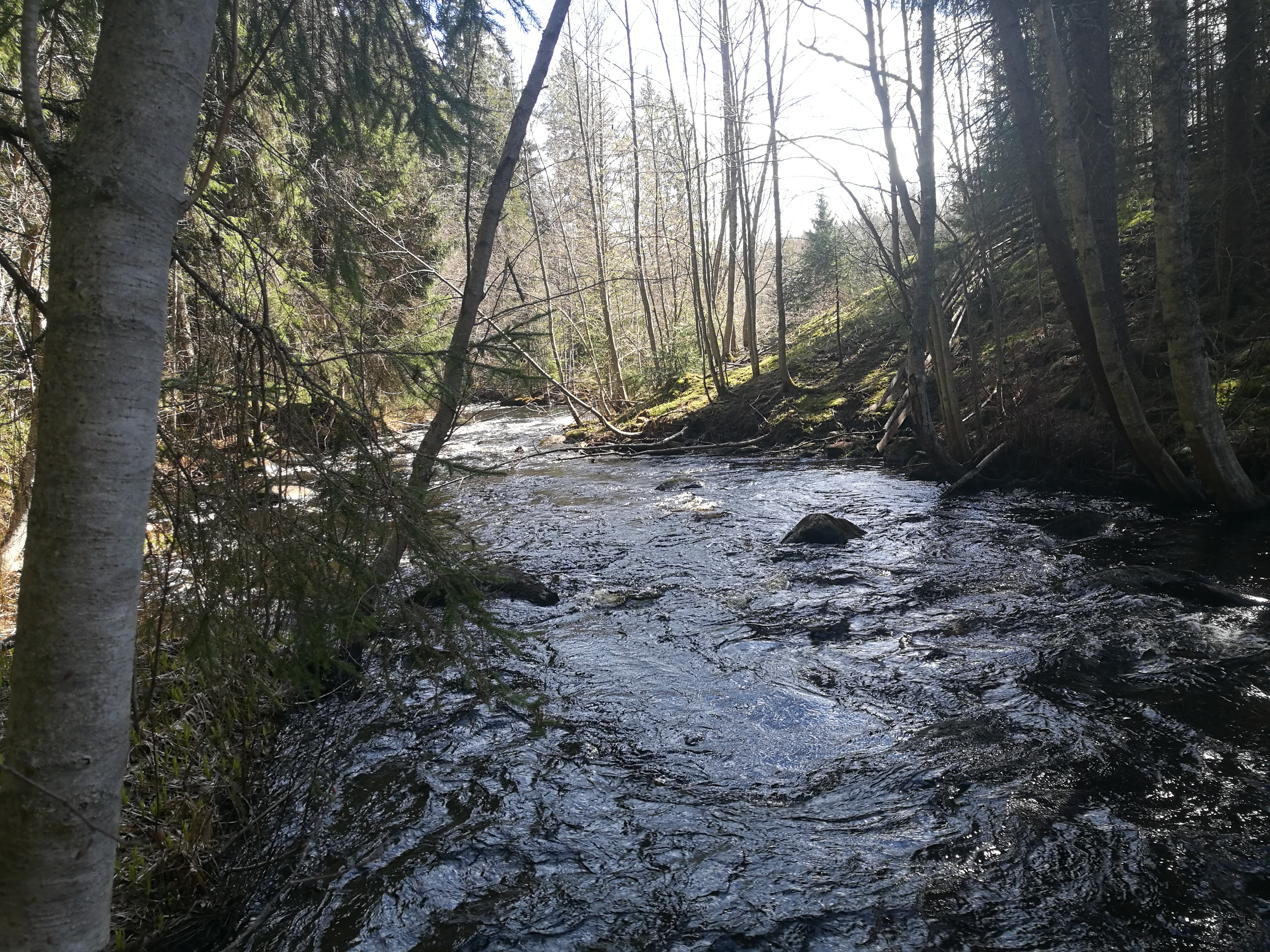
The river Vispiläjoki

Kuohu is located on the border with the municipality of Petäjävesi, some 18 kilometers (11 mi) west of downtown Jyväskylä. The village of Sarvenperä within the former municipality of Korpilahti is located south of Kuohu and is closely connected to it in terms of traffic.

The center of Kuohu is located by four lakes: Iso-Lampsi, Pikku-Lampsi, Neulajärvi and Niemijärvi. Other lakes or ponds include Marjojärvi, Neulalampi, Mustalampi and Lauttalampi. All lakes in the area are part of lake Muuratjärvi's watershed. The terrain around the four central lakes is quite flat, with the exception of the hills Lampsinmäki and Marjovuori, which reach a height of 40 meters (130 ft) above the lakes. Most fields in Kuohu are no longer in use, with the only active farm in Kuohu as of 2019 being Niemi, located on an isthmus between Iso-Lampsi and Pikku-Lampsi.

=== Boundaries ===
On 31 December 2023, the urban area of Kuohu had a population of 372, a surface area of 2.02 square kilometers (0.78 sq mi) and a population density of 184.2 inhabitants per square kilometer (477/sq mi). The urban area comprises the densely populated part of Kuohu around the lake Iso-Lampsi, but also extends north of the national road and railroad. The village of Kuohu is a wider area that had a population of 565 in 2016, of whom 317 lived in the village center, 124 in the surrounding rural areas and 124 in the area north of the railroad.

Kuohu is also the name of Jyväskylä's 55th official district. The district covers all of the urban area, while also extending from the border with Petäjävesi in the west to lake Vähä-Vesanka in the east.

== History ==
In the first half of the 16th century, the lands around Iso-Lampsi were hunting grounds owned by the Pauhari family from Urjala. While privately held hunting grounds in the region were being settled around the time, this possession called Lamsinsalmi was not, and instead became part of the village of Vesanka settled between 1559 and 1564.

New farms were established in the hinterlands of Vesanka during the Great Partition carried out between the 18th and 19th centuries, including the Lampsinmäki and Lampsila farms. The former was established in 1803 and the latter in 1829. The farms began leasing land to tenant farmers soon after; by 1881 Lampsinmäki had seven tenant farms, while Lampsila had two.

Kuohu started developing into a settlement distinct from Vesanka in the late 19th century around industry and the Haapamäki–Jyväskylä railway. In 1878, the Kuohunkoski ironworks were established by Karl Gustaf Strömberg on lands rented from the Lampsinmäki farm, using water power from the Kuohunkoski rapids between Neulajärvi and Iso-Lampsi. However, the ironworks were short-lived, as they were disestablished in 1884.

Kuohu began growing in the 1920s around a sawmill (Kuohu Oy) and a tar factory, with worker homes being built around them on the shores of Iso-Lampsi, Neulajärvi and Neulalampi. The sawmill was bought by Toras Oy in 1940 after the company had to leave Suojärvi, which had been occupied by and later ceded to the Soviet Union following the Winter War. Following World War II, the sawmill itself employed some 70 people while also providing jobs for people transporting wood to the mill, peaking at around 200 during winters. Wood for tar production was felled in Laajavuori and Hanhiperä, first transported via horse to Ruoke and from there to Kuohu via rail.

The main method of travel to and from Kuohu was by rail until the 1960s, when personal cars became more common and the national road 18/23 was built through the village. In the early 1980s, the closure of the sawmill caused the population of Kuohu to decline from around 600 to 400 people.

The municipalities of Jyväskylän maalaiskunta and Korpilahti were consolidated with the city of Jyväskylä in 2009. On 8 October 2009, Kuohu became the name of one of Jyväskylä's official districts.

== Services ==
=== School ===
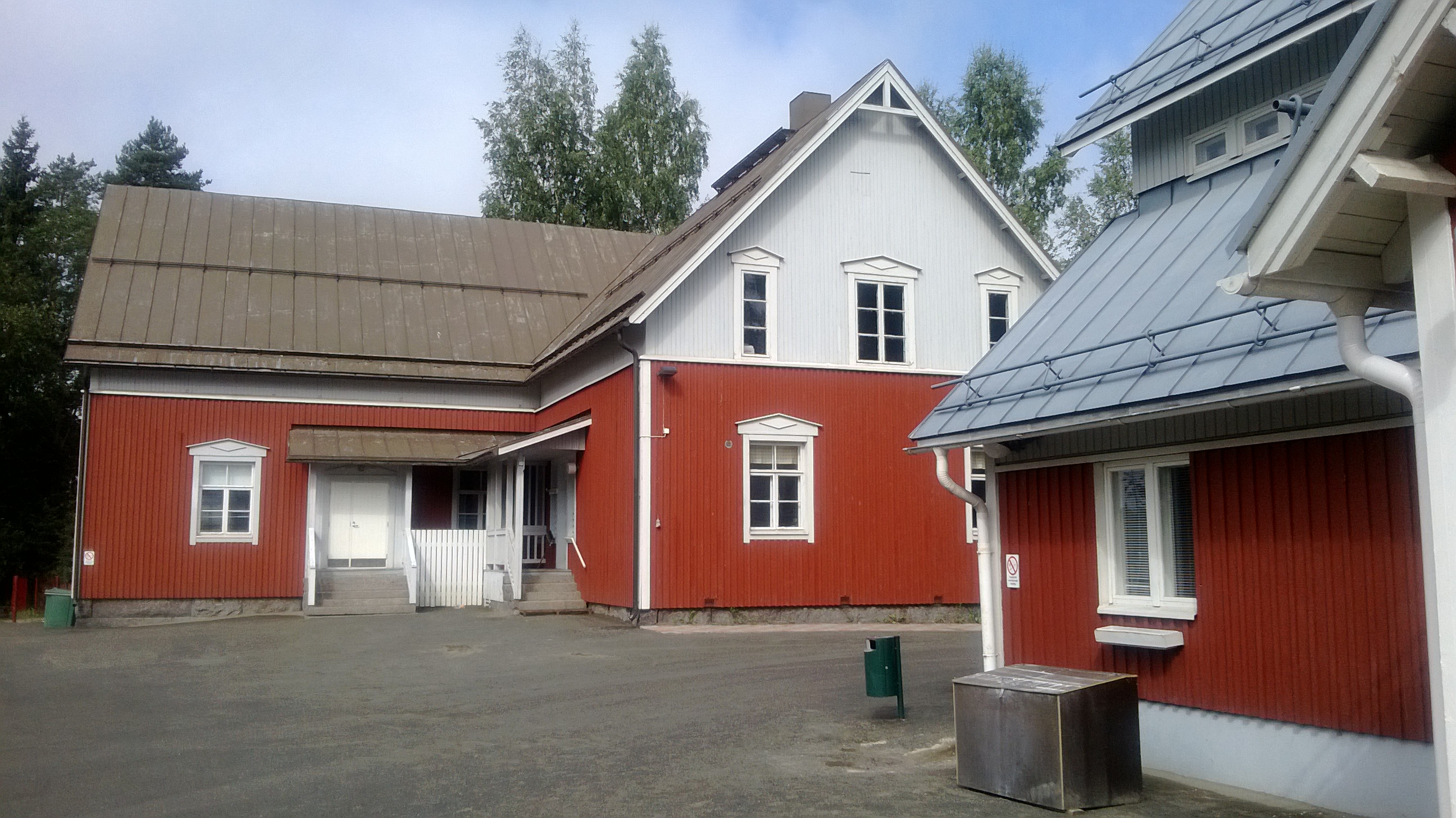
Kuohu school

There is a school for grades 1–4 of peruskoulu in Kuohu, sharing a building with a daycare center. The school was established under an older education system (kansakoulu) in 1914. Currently, the school consists of two buildings, an older one finished in 1929 and a newer finished in 1986.

=== Stores ===
The last store in Kuohu, Kuohun Kauppa, was closed in June 2017. Other stores that have operated in the village include Koivuranta (part of Kesko), a branch of Osuuskauppa Mäki-Matti, and the privately owned T. Virtanen. There was also a bar in Kuohu until 2010.

== Events ==
The youth association hall of Kuohu, built in 1927, is used as a venue for various local events. A special stage of Rally Finland has also been held in Kuohu.

== Notable people ==
- Mikko Hannula (born 1967), sports commentator
- Ismo Leikola (born 1979), comedian
