= Keljo =

- District of Jyväskylä
- Location in Central Finland
- Coordinates: 62.2163611°N 25.7185301°E
- Country: Finland
- Region: Central Finland
- Sub-region: Jyväskylä sub-region
- City: Jyväskylä
- Ward: Keljo

Population (2021-12-31)
  - Total: 1,049
- Time zone: UTC+2 (EET)
  - Summer (DST): UTC+3 (EEST)

Keljo is a district of Jyväskylä, in Central Finland, and a former village of Jyväskylän maalaiskunta. The distance to central Jyväskylä is about 4 kilometres (2.5 mi).

Keljo forms the Keljo ward together with Keljonkangas, Sääksvuori and Etelä-Keljo.

== Geography ==
The district borders Kukkumäki and Mattilanpelto in the north, Ristonmaa and Ristikivi in the east, Keljonkangas in the south, Etelä-Keljo in the southwest and Keltinmäki in the west. Keljo is subdivided into the areas of Keljon keskus, Valkola, Hauskala and Tarhamäki (Tarhamäentie). The larger Keljo ward also borders the municipality of Muurame.

The modern district of Keljo (Etu-Keljo/Tarhamäki) was officially part of the register village of Jyväskylä and not Keljo proper, however the area has unofficially been seen as a part of Keljo at least since the establishment of the town of Jyväskylä. The register village of Keljo consisted of the modern districts of Keljonkangas, Ristikivi (Sippulanniemi), Etelä-Keljo, Sääksvuori, Taka-Keljo and Hanhiperä, as well as the Perälä area in modern Vesanka and the Pohjanlahti suburb in northwestern Nenäinniemi.

=== Lakes ===
Keljo is located near the Päijänne, Finland's second largest lake. Other nearby lakes include Jyväsjärvi and Myllyjärvi.

=== Roads ===
The Finnish national road 9 passes through Keljo and connects to road 6019 (called Keuruuntie) in nearby Ristonmaa.

== History ==
Keljo was first mentioned in 1545 as Kehdio. Its name may be derived from the village of Keljo in Sahalahti or the Tavastian word kelja meaning "group". The area was originally hunting grounds of the people of Sääksmäki, due to which Keljo was administratively a part of Sääksmäki, despite the distance to Sääksmäki proper. Ecclesiastically Keljo was either a part of Jämsä or Rautalampi.

After the Laukaa parish was separated from Rautalampi, Keljo was transferred to it by 1646 along with Jyväskylä and other nearby villages. Jyväskylä was granted chapel rights in 1676, with the chapel community also including Keljo, Palokka, Haapaniemi, Puuppola, Vesanka, Vehniä, Tikkamannila and Nyrölä.

The Jyväskylä parish, established in the 1850s, was separated administratively from Laukaa in 1868 as Jyväskylän maalaiskunta. The northernmost parts of Keljo were transferred to the town of Jyväskylä in 1941 and the rest of Keljo was added to the growing town in 1965. Central Keljo later expanded into a suburban and commercial area, with the old rural Keljo mainly being visible in the former village's outskirts such as Hanhiperä and Taka-Keljo.

The register village of Keljo still officially existed within Jyväskylän mlk until the municipality's dissolution in 2009, though the register village only included tiny parts of the municipality: Perälä south of Vesanka and the islands of Iso-Poro and Vähä-Poro in the Päijänne.

== Services ==
=== Commercial ===
Keljonkeskus is one of Jyväskylä's major commercial areas. It contains the Keljon kauppakeskus, a mall with a K-Citymarket hypermarket and 22 other stores. The mall was originally built as only the hypermarket, being expanded to its current size in 2010.

== Gallery ==
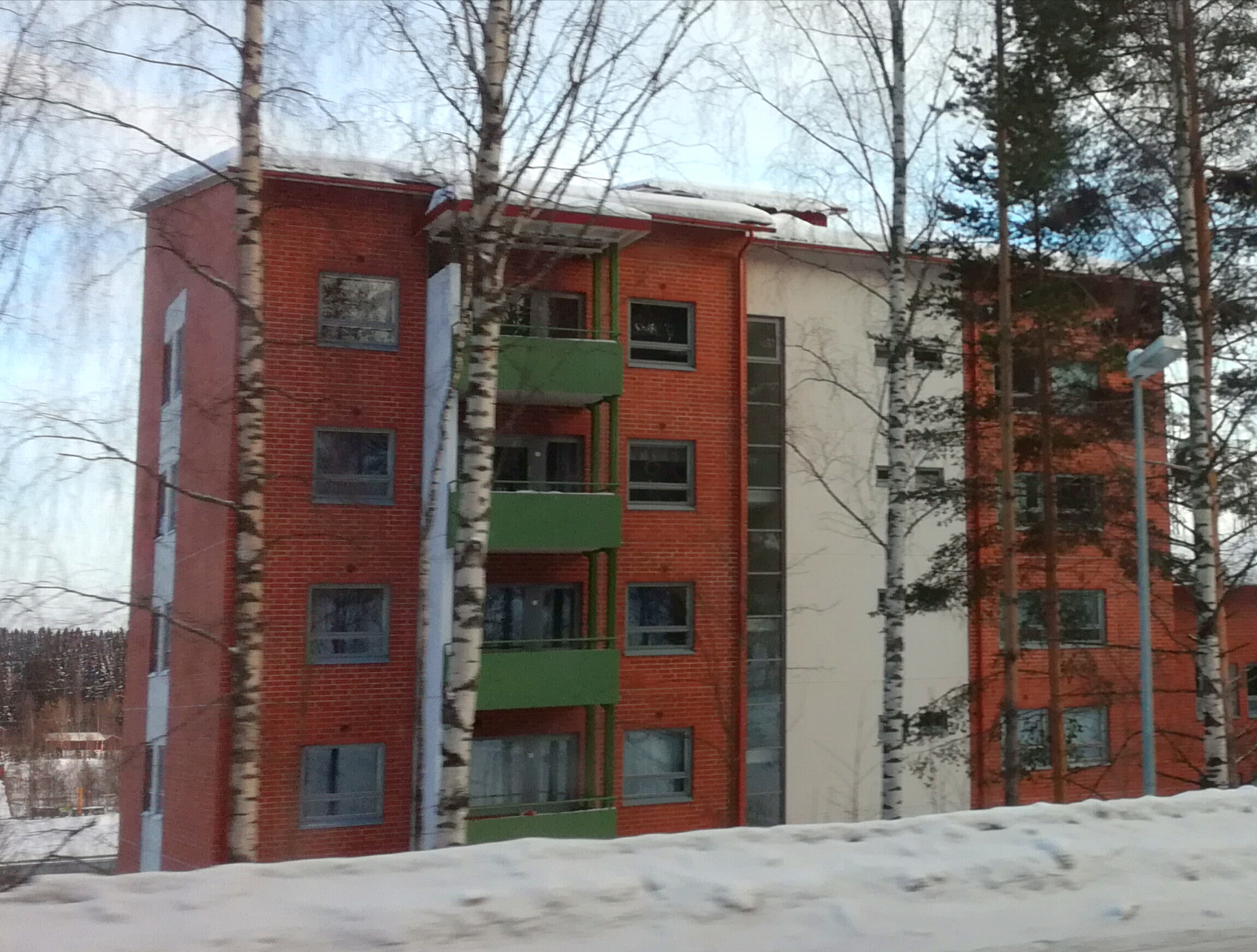
An apartment in central Keljo.

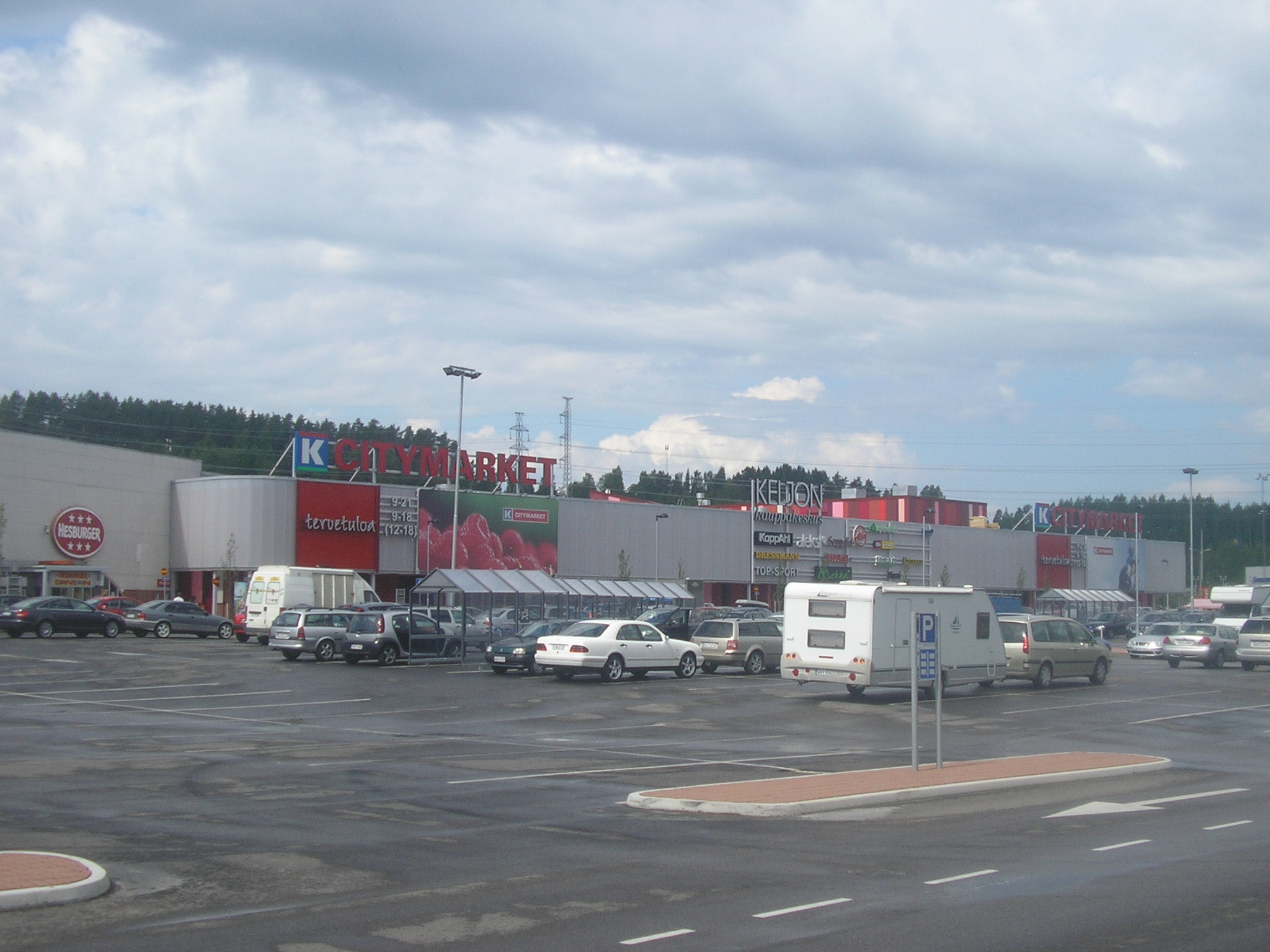
K-Citymarket in Keljonkeskus.

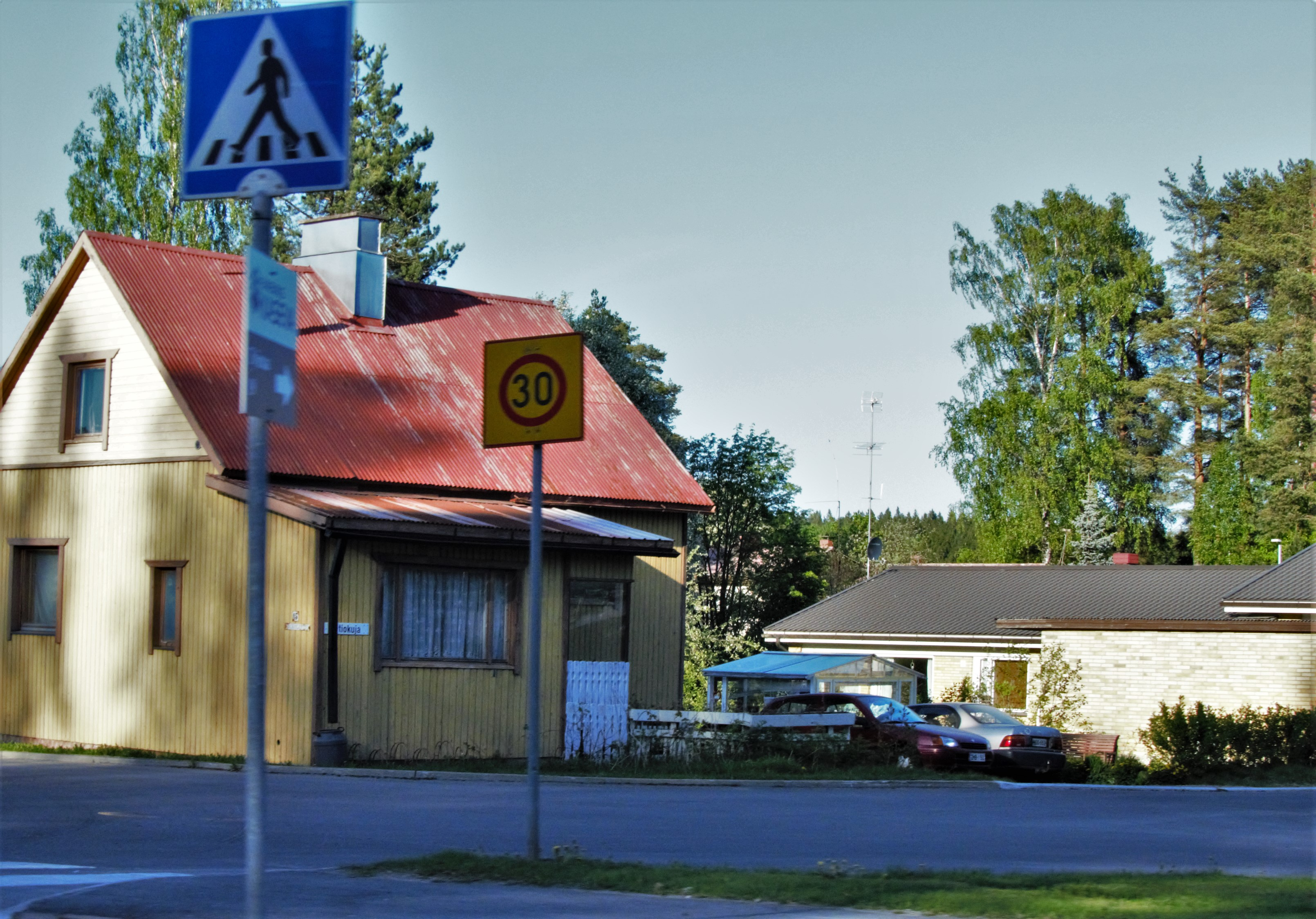
Houses in Valkola.

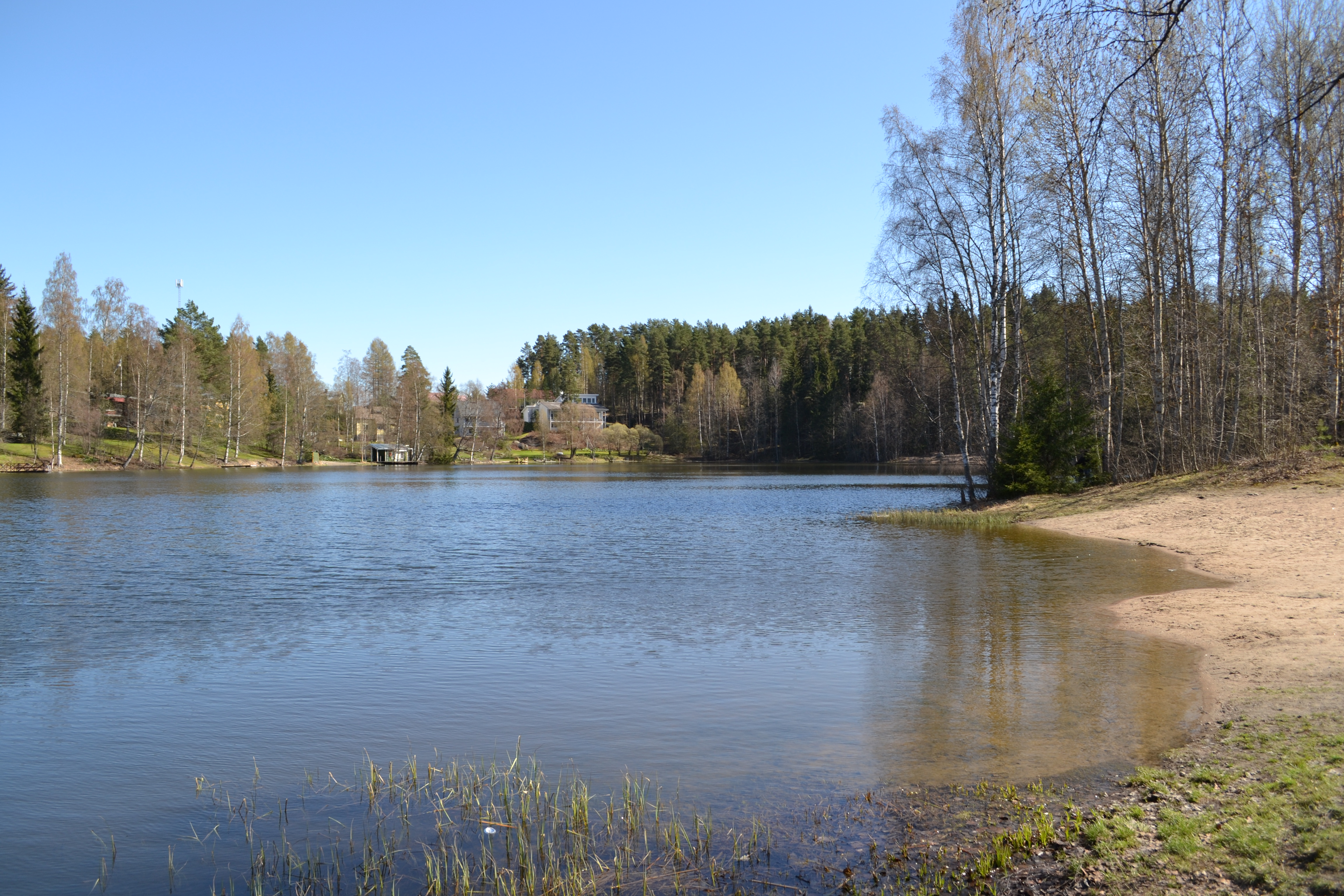
View from the lake Myllyjärvi towards Hauskala.
