= Vesanka =

- District of Jyväskylä
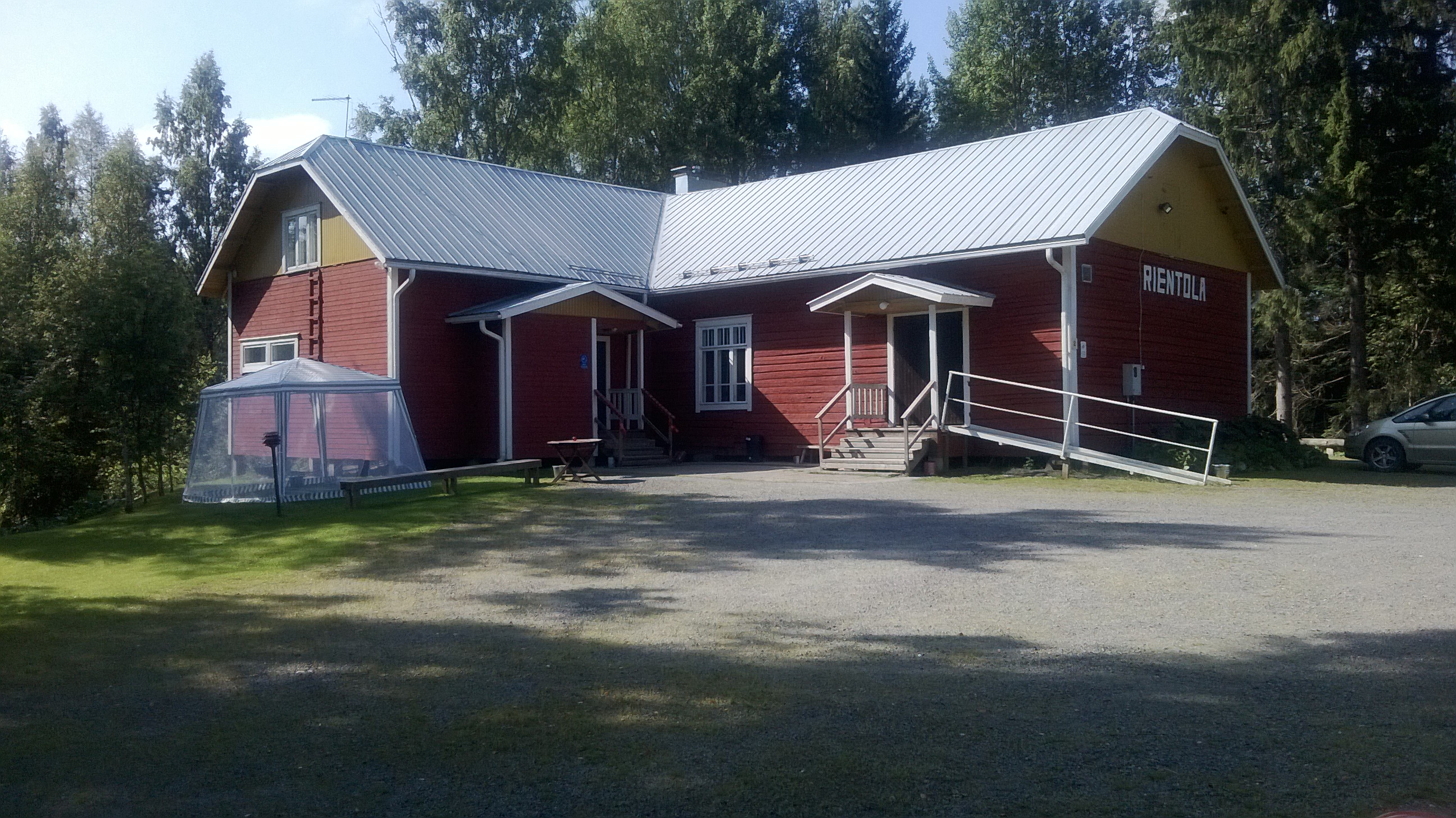
- "Rientola", the community hall of Vesanka.

- Location in Central Finland
- Coordinates: 62.267°N 25.566°E
- Country: Finland
- Region: Central Finland
- Sub-region: Jyväskylä sub-region
- City: Jyväskylä
- Ward: Kuohu-Vesanka

Population (2021-12-31)
  - Total: 1,723
- Time zone: UTC+2 (EET)
  - Summer (DST): UTC+3 (EEST)

Vesanka is a village and a district of the city of Jyväskylä, in Central Finland. Before 1 January 2009, it was one of the villages of Jyväskylän maalaiskunta. It is located in the far western part of Jyväskylä near its borders with Petäjävesi, Muurame and, until 31 December 2008, Korpilahti.

Residential concentrations within the official district include Kettulanmäki, Kylmäoja, Möykynmäki and Perälä. Vesanka forms the Kuohu-Vesanka ward together with Kuohu, Ruoke and Varsalanperä. Vesanka was classified as a separate urban area (taajama) until 2019.

== Geography ==
The district of Vesanka borders Varsalanperä in the north, Rippalanmäki, Ruoke and Valkeamäki in the east, Hanhiperä in the southeast, Isolahti (Muurame) in the south and Kuohu in the west. The village itself is mainly located on the shores of the lake Vesankajärvi, the ninth largest lake in Jyväskylä.

Vesanka was traditionally divided into two sides: Iso-Vesanka and Vähä-Vesanka, based on old church examination areas (kinkeripiirit). The school of Vesanka is located in Iso-Vesanka, while the former train station was in Vähä-Vesanka.

The register village (rekisterikylä, an official village) of Vesanka also included Kuohu, Varsalanperä, Humalamäki, Vertaala and western Saarenmaa, but not Perälä, which was a part of Keljo instead.

== History ==
Before the spread of modern settlement into the area, the lands of Vesanka were hunting grounds of Saarioinen (approximately modern Akaa and southern Sääksmäki). In the early 16th century, the lands surrounding the lake Vesankajärvi were held by Tapani Matinpoika from the village of Saari, while the Lamsinsalmi area around the lake Iso-Lampsi was held by Olavi Pauhari from modern Urjala. The first recorded settler in Vesanka was Antti Soikkanen, who was first mentioned as an inhabitant of the area in 1559. Three other settlers had arrived by 1564: Antti Siekkinen, Heikki Pietiläinen and Lauri Pörsöinen. As a village, Vesanka is first mentioned in 1561 as vesangaerffui (Vesankajärvi).

In 1564, the entirety of the Saarioinen division (hallintopitäjä), including its external territories, was given to Klas Kristersson Horn and his descendants as a fief. This fief included eight leasehold farms (lampuotitila) in Central Finland, four of which were in Vesanka. The Siekkilä and Ristola farms were subtracted from the fief in 1673, followed by the remaining farms around 1706.

Vesanka was a part of either the parish of Jämsä or Rautalampi until Laukaa was separated from Rautalampi, after which the villages of the Jyväskylä area were transferred to it. The transfer was made permanent in 1646. Jyväskylä became an independent parish in 1856. In 1868, Jyväskylän maalaiskunta was established, with Vesanka becoming one of its villages.

The borders of Vesanka were demarcated during the Great Partition. Initially, a pond named Rummakkolampi on the modern border between Jyväskylä and Uurainen was designated as the northernmost point of Vesanka. This changed in the 1830s, as the new settlement at Sikomäki was transferred to the register village of Nyrölä. A metal workshop was established by the Kuohunkoski rapids in 1878 in the area that would later be known as Kuohu. However, the most important industrial enterprise was a sawmill established in the 1920s, purchased by the company Toras Oy from Suojärvi after Suojärvi was occupied by and ceded to the Soviet Union in the 1940s.

There were plans to expand Vesanka in the 1970s into a built-up area comparable to Tikkakoski in the northern part of Jyväskylän mlk. By then, four small suburban areas had developed along the major roads of Vesanka; the plan would have expanded them towards the road leading to Nyrölä. A zoning plan for Vesanka and Ruoke was made in the mid-1990s and was expanded to Kuohu by 2008.

Vesanka became a part of the town of Jyväskylä after Jyväskylän maalaiskunta was consolidated with it on 1 January 2009.

== Services ==
=== Education ===
Vesanka has a united "daycare school", with the school educating grades 1-6 (ala-aste). Grades 7-9 (yläaste) attend the Viitaniemi School closer to central Jyväskylä.

=== Other ===
Vesala in the southern part of the village contains a rentable campground owned by the church of Jyväskylä.

== Gallery ==
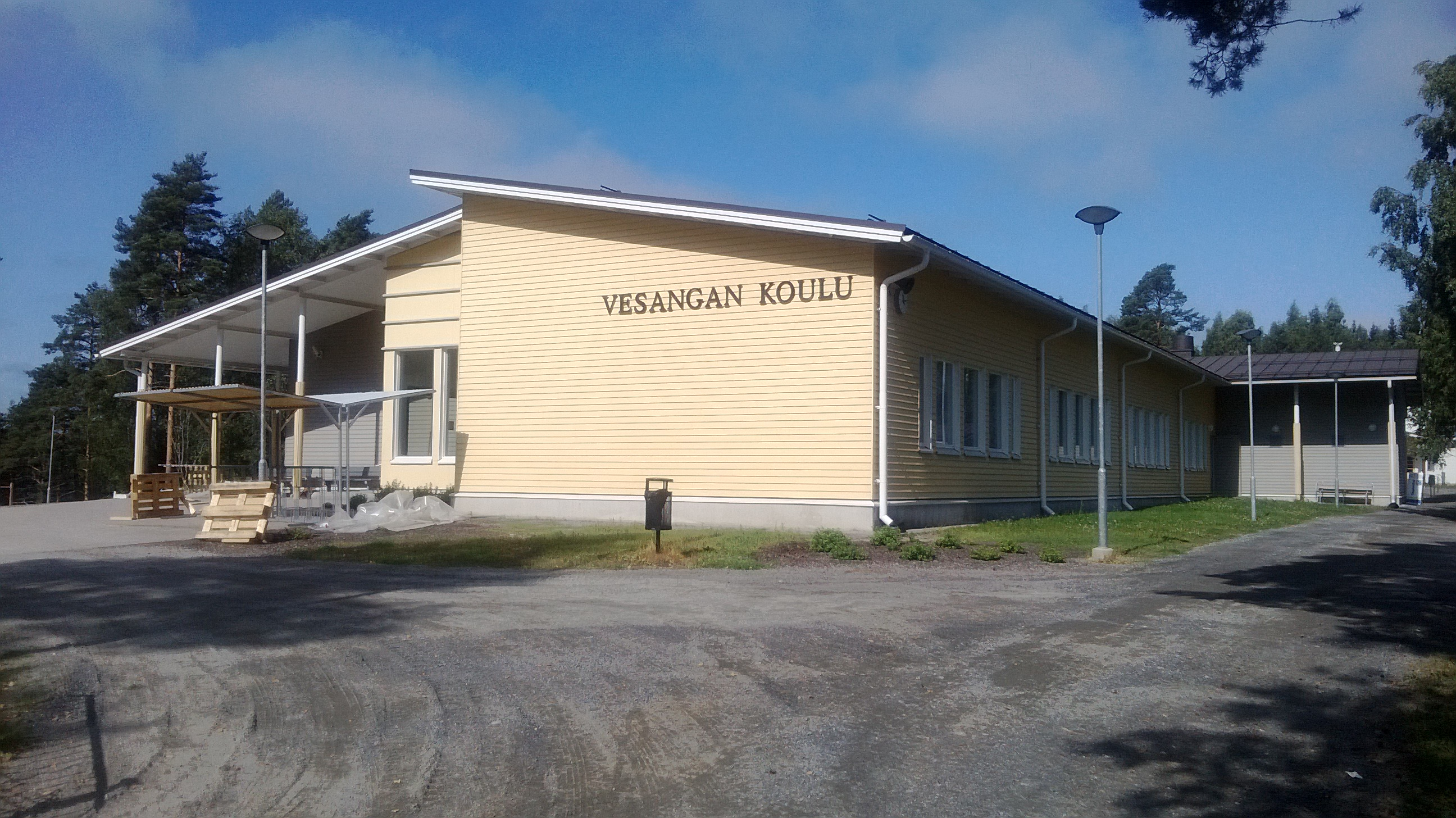
The school of Vesanka in 2013.

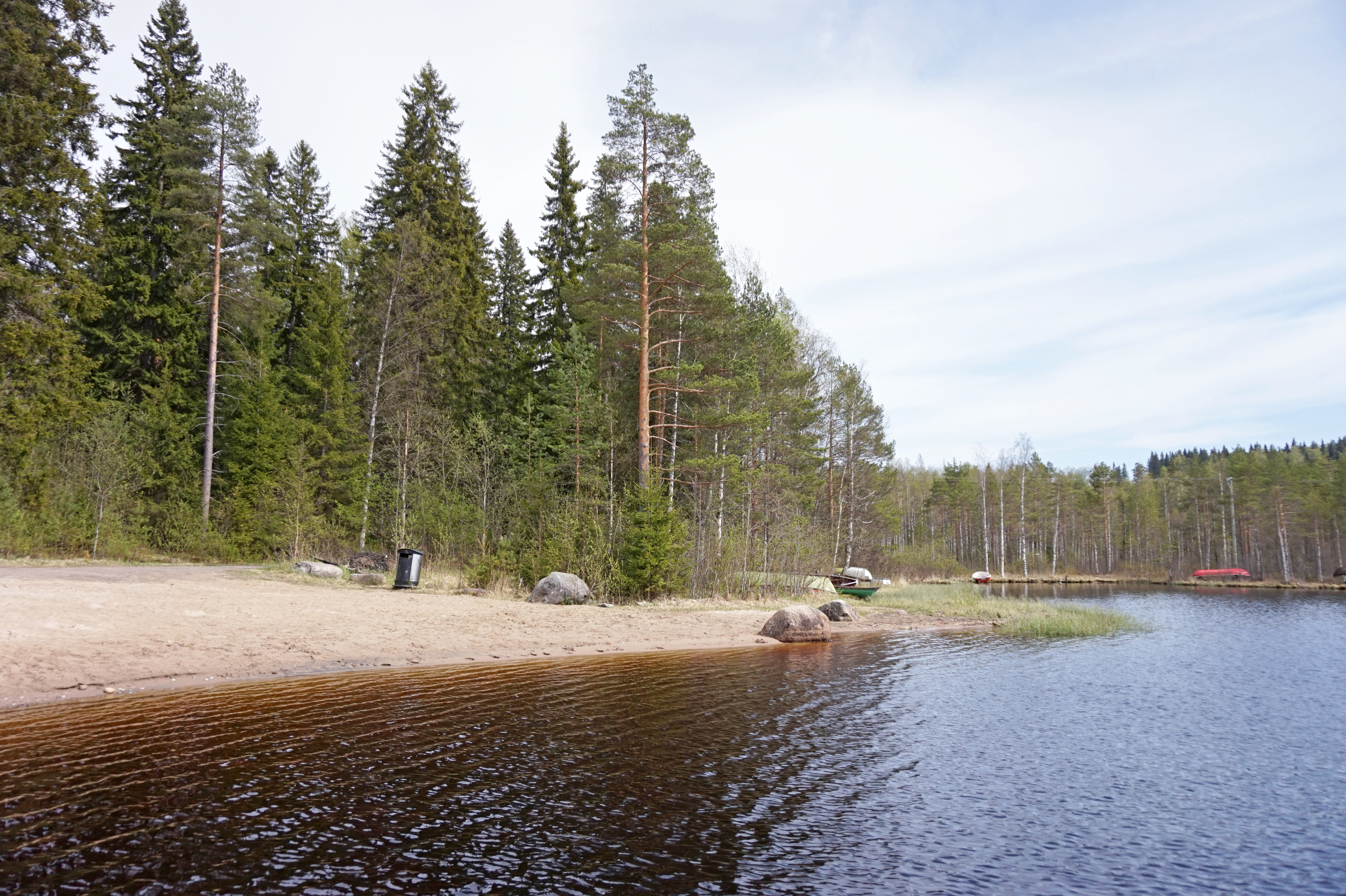
A beach by the lake Vesankajärvi.
