= Kypärämäki =

Coordinates: 62°14′17″N 25°41′33″E

- District of Jyväskylä
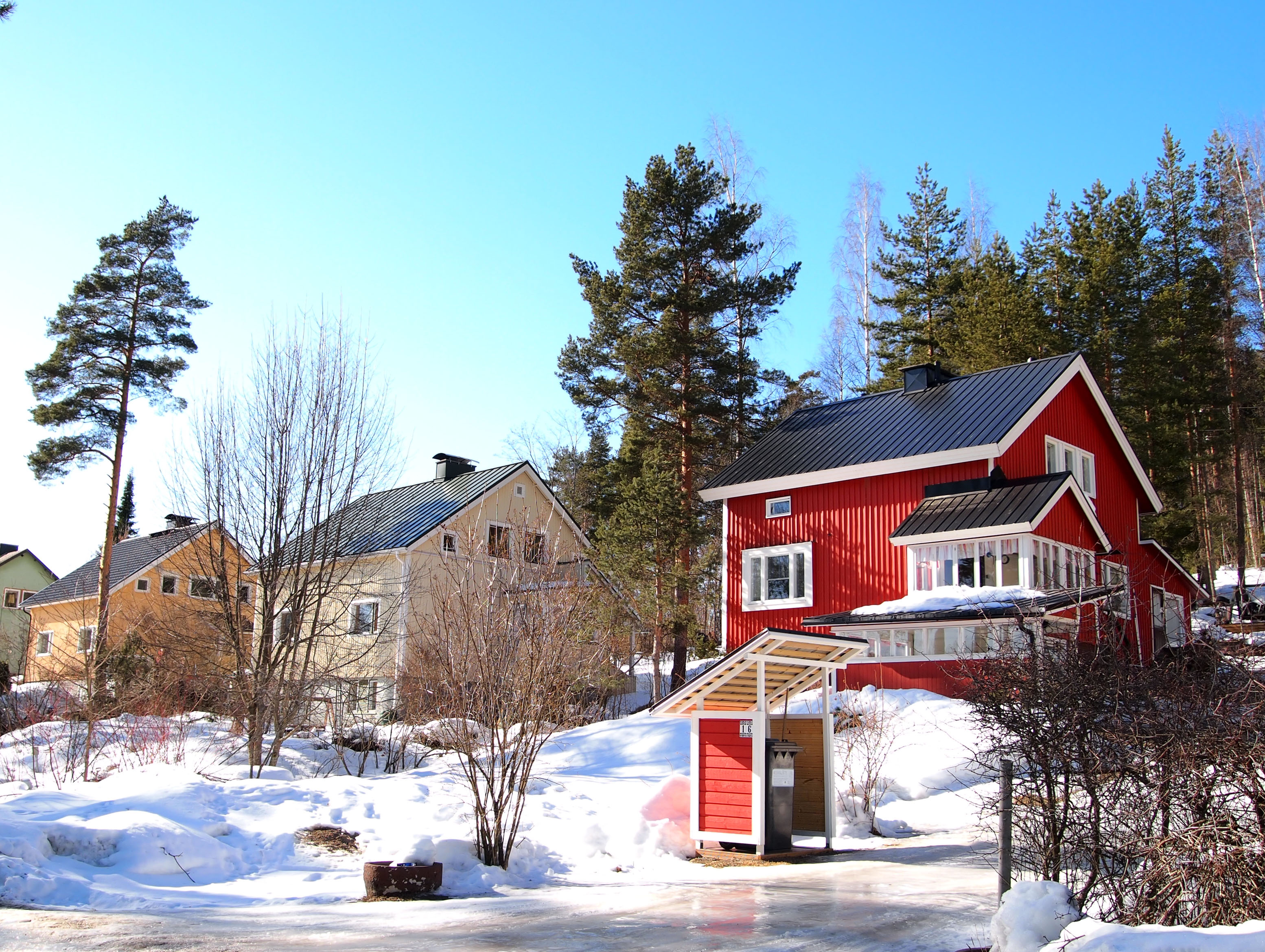
- Houses on the street Vuorikatu
- Country: Finland
- Region: Central Finland
- Sub-region: Jyväskylä sub-region
- City: Jyväskylä
- Ward: Kypärämäki-Kortepohja

Population
  - Total: 3,150
- Time zone: UTC+2 (EET)
  - Summer (DST): UTC+3 (EEST)
- Postal code: 40630

Kypärämäki (literal English translation: helmet hill) is a district of Jyväskylä, Finland. It is located at around 3.5 kilometres (2.2 mi) from the city centre south from the sports and recreational area of Laajavuori and east from the lake Köhniönjärvi. There are 3150 inhabitants in Kypärämäki. The district includes the residential area of Köhniö and the Killeri horse racing venue. Most houses in Kypärämäki were built in the 1940s or the 1950s.

Kypärämäki is also the name of a hill in the area, whose peak reaches a height of 187 metres (614 ft) above sea level. Its eastern slope is visible from afar and its vegetation ranges from rocky pine forest to fertile deciduous forest.

== Gallery ==
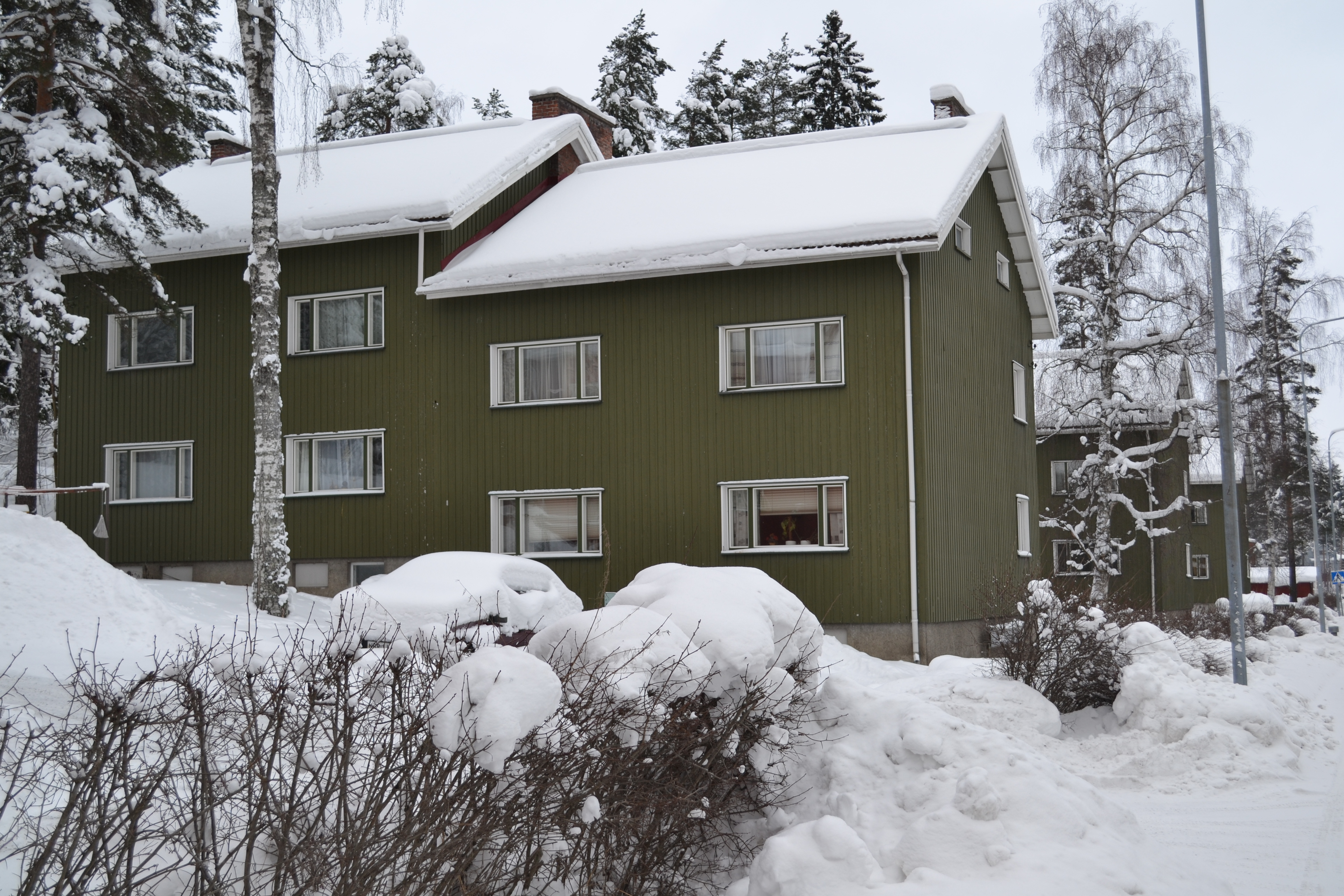
A house in Kypärämäki

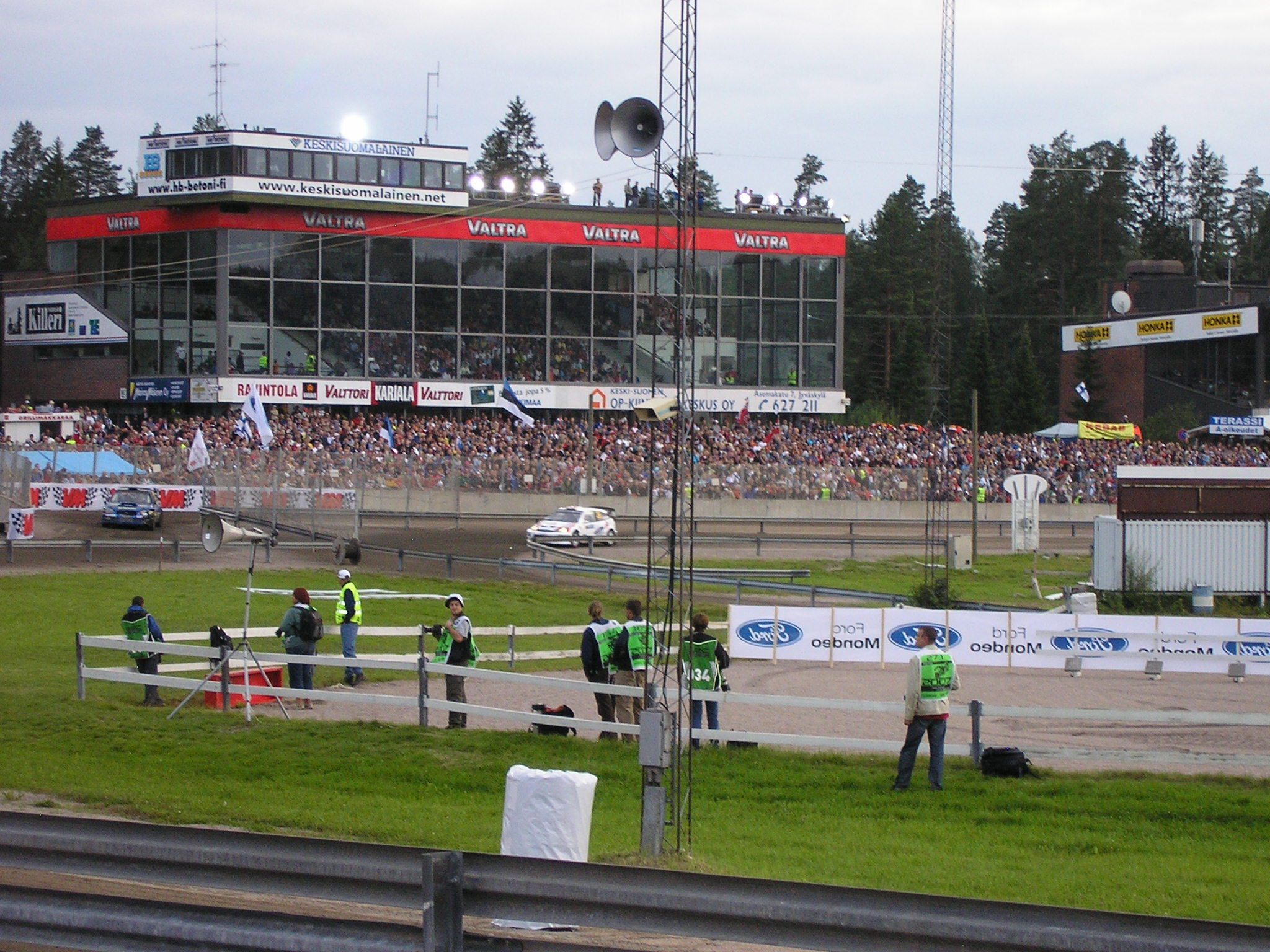
Killeri harness racing track during Rally Finland

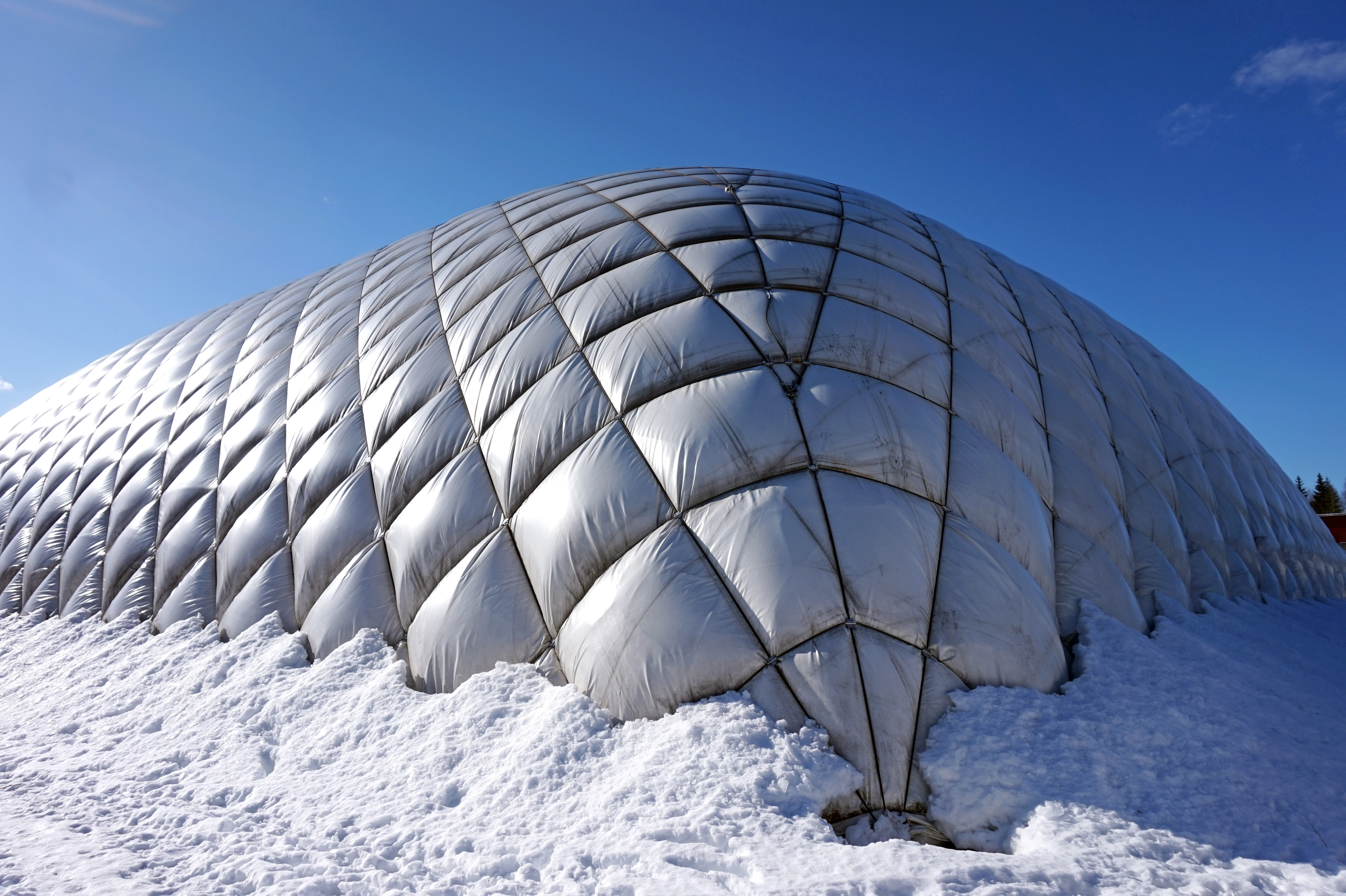
Killeri sports center

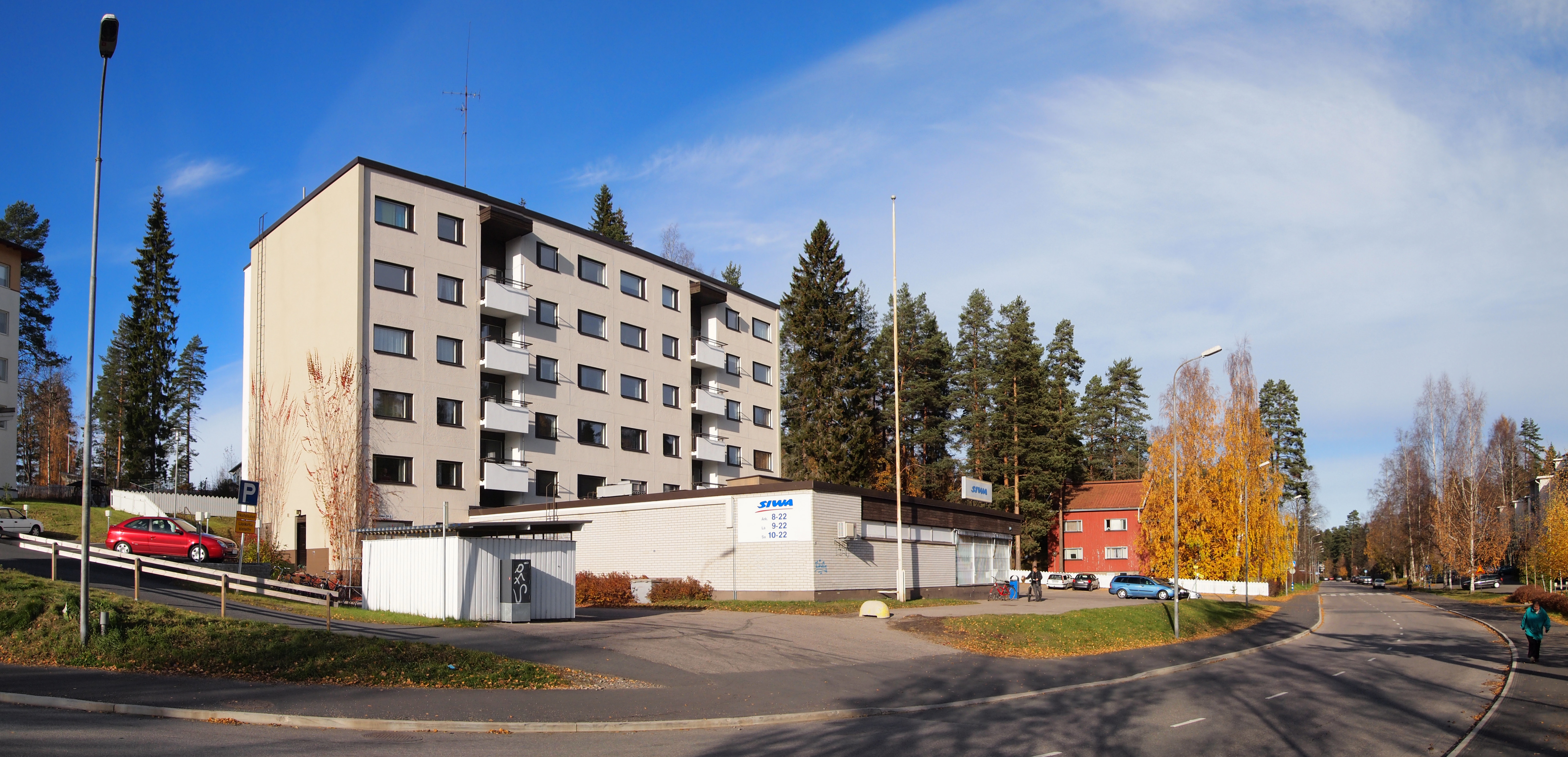
An apartment building in Kypärämäki

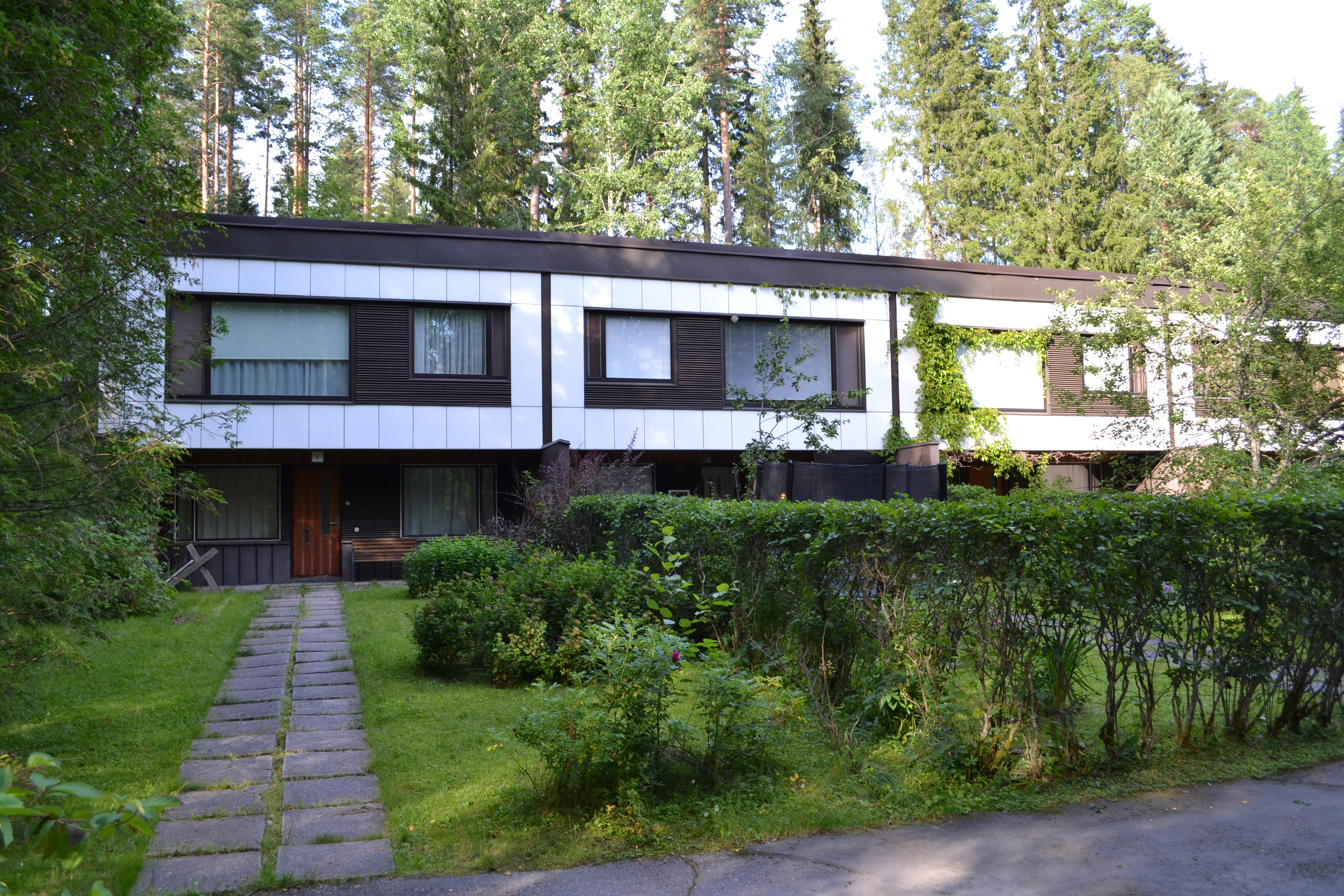
A house in Köhniö
