= Keljonkangas =

- District of Jyväskylä
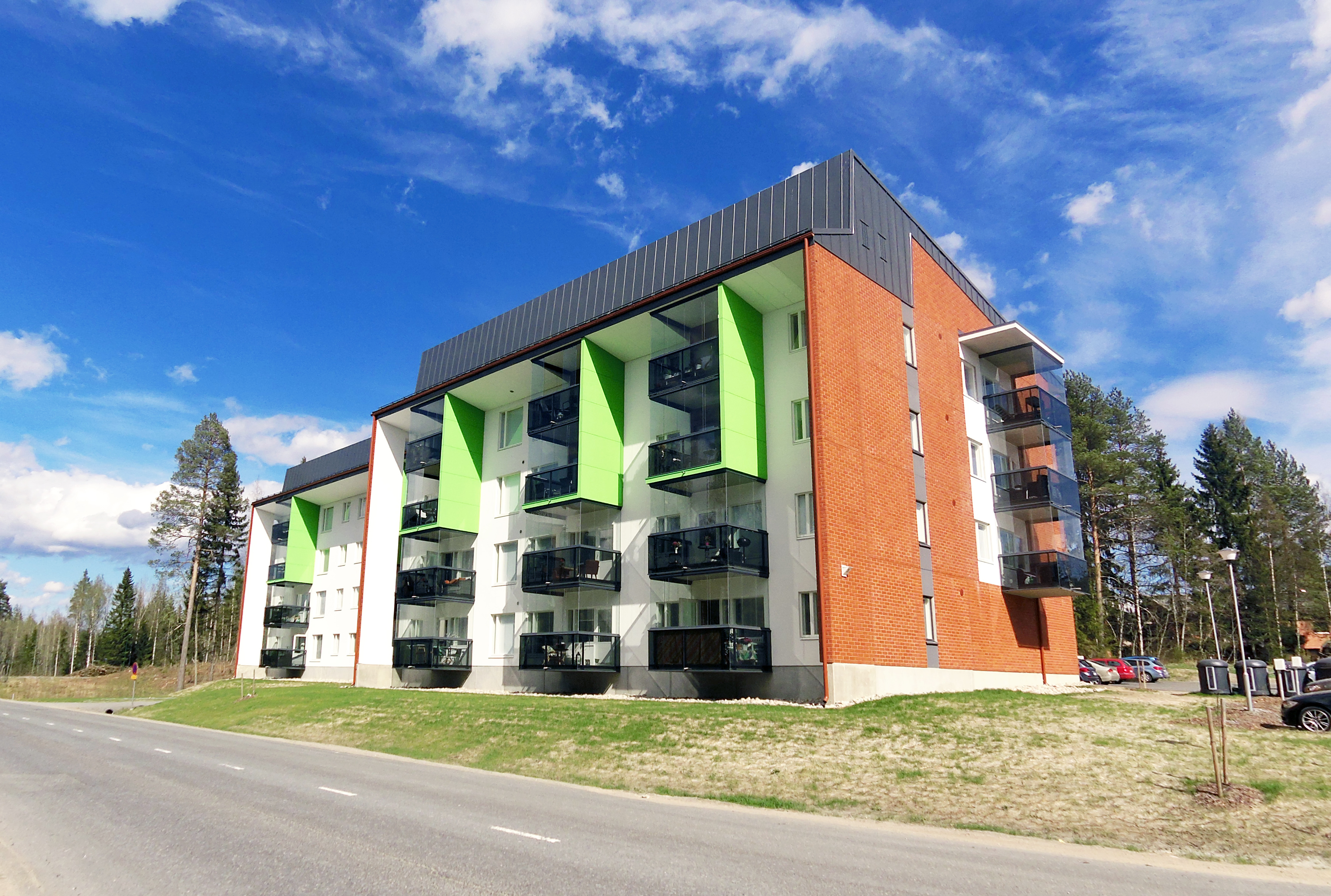
- Newer apartment building in the Kaijanlampi area

- Location in Central Finland
- Coordinates: 62.1888°N 25.7128°E
- Country: Finland
- Region: Central Finland
- Sub-region: Jyväskylä sub-region
- City: Jyväskylä
- Ward: Keljo

Population (2016)
  - Total: 5,507
- Time zone: UTC+2 (EET)
  - Summer (DST): UTC+3 (EEST)

Keljonkangas is a district of Jyväskylä, Finland. It is located in the southern part of the city near the border with Muurame. The district is mainly residential, with the predominant types of housing being terraces and detached houses built between the 1950s and 1980s.

The modern district includes the core of the historical village of Keljo, which was first mentioned in a written source from 1543. The historic center was located near the shore of the Päijänne, the second largest lake in Finland. Keljonkangas proper began developing into a suburban area after the Second World War, eventually surpassing the historical center of Keljo by the Keljonlahti bay. Keljonkangas became part of the town of Jyväskylä in 1965.

Keljonkangas is also a statistical area, which is divided into seven sub-districts: Keljonkankaan keskusta, Keskikangas, Kaijanlampi, Jokipakka, Keljonlahti, Sarvivuori and Urtti.

== Geography ==
Keljonkangas is located near the lake Päijänne. The river Myllyoja flows through the western part of the district and merges with the Kauraoja in the northern part of the district to form the Joppakanjoki, which flows through a canyon-like formation into the Keljonlahti bay of the Päijänne.

The forested valley of a small stream between the hills Sarvivuori and Haapavuori near Muurame has been designated as a conservation site.

=== Administrative boundaries ===
The district of Keljonkangas belongs to the Keljo ward along with Keljo (Tarhamäki or Etu-Keljo), Sääksvuori and Etelä-Keljo. Traditionally Keljonkangas was a smaller area around the modern "Keljonkankaan keskusta" sub-district while the Keljonlahti-Jokipakka area between Keljonkangas proper and Etu-Keljo was seen as a separate area.

== History ==
The area of the modern district of Keljonkangas, specifically its northern divisions Keljonlahti and Jokipakka, was the center of the village of Keljo. Oral tradition suggests that the first permanent inhabitants were hunters from Sysmä who settled by the Keljonlahti bay in the 14th century, however, no records for this have been found. The first confirmed settlers came to the area in the early 16th century from Sääksmäki, establishing the farms of Keljo and Sysmäläinen. The village was initially known as Päijänteenpohja, but was later renamed to Keljo after the farm of Keljo. This was likely done to distinguish it from another Päijänteenpohja, the modern village of Rutalahti in Leivonmäki.

Administratively Keljo was an exclave of the Sääksmäki division. The nearby villages of Jyväskylä and Palokka were in a similar state, although they were parts of the Saarioinen division (modern southern Sääksmäki and Akaa). Ecclesiastically Keljo was a part of the Jämsä parish until 1561, when the Rautalampi parish was established. The transfer was not permanent, as Keljo was soon transferred back to the Jämsä parish in 1575 and back to Rautalampi in 1627. In 1628, the Laukaa parish was separated from Rautalampi, Keljo being a part of it until it was transferred back to Jämsä in 1634. The final transfer was made in 1646, when Keljo became a part of the Laukaa parish. Administratively Keljo was a part of Sääksmäki until 1690.

Until the start of the Great Partition in the 18th century, the only farms in the village of Keljo were the initial two farms, Keljo (Lotila) and Sysmäläinen. These farms were divided in 1805, resulting in the establishment of the Sulkula, Särkkä and Hakala farms, as well as the Vähämäki and Pirttimäki farms in what is now Taka-Keljo.

Industrial and commercial development in Keljo began after the town of Jyväskylä was established in 1837. In January 1852, Jonas Särkkä from Keljo initiated a meeting regarding the potential separation of the Jyväskylä chapel community as an independent parish. The Jyväskylä parish was established on the fourth day of February 1856. The municipality of Jyväskylän maalaiskunta was established on the territories of the Jyväskylä parish that were not part of the town in 1868.

The Jokipakka area developed into a suburban area after the foundry of Keljo was moved to the road Harakkaraitti (now known as Valimontie 23) in 1934, replacing the earlier cluster of small tenure homes. The development of Keljonkangas proper into a more urbanized area began after the Second World War, soon surpassing the older settlement at Keljonlahti, due to which the school of Keljo was moved further south to Keljonkangas in 1951. The seasonal home areas of the southern Keljonlahti bay and the Iso-Urtti peninsula were developed in the 1930s.

Keljonkangas and almost the entire register village of Keljo was transferred from Jyväskylän mlk to the town of Jyväskylä in 1965. Keljonkangas and Sääksvuori were zoned in 1979.

== Economy ==
Agriculture and livestock were important sources of income especially in the Keljonlahti area until the 1960s-1970s, when a railway to Jämsänkoski was built in between the fields, which severely restricted agriculture in the area.

=== Industry ===
The Keljo foundry (Keljon Rauta- ja Metallivalimo) was established in 1920 on the lands of the Sysmälä farm. It was relocated to the Jokipakka area in 1934. The foundry produced various small iron and brass products, such as manhole covers and oven gratings. It was closed in 1953 soon after its manager Eino Sundqvist retired.

Modern enterprises include a factory producing office furniture (Treston Oy, until 2011 Sovella Oy).

=== Power plant ===
The Keljonlahti power plant was finished in 2010. The plant mainly uses wood and peat as fuel, however the use of peat will end by 2026.

== Services ==
=== Education ===
There is a school for grades 1-4 and another school for grades 5–9, the latter also provides education for children from Säynätsalo and Muuratsalo after the 4th grade.

=== Commercial ===
The only grocery store in Keljonkangas is a K-Market in the central area. There is also an ABC (S Group) service station near the national road 9.

== Gallery ==
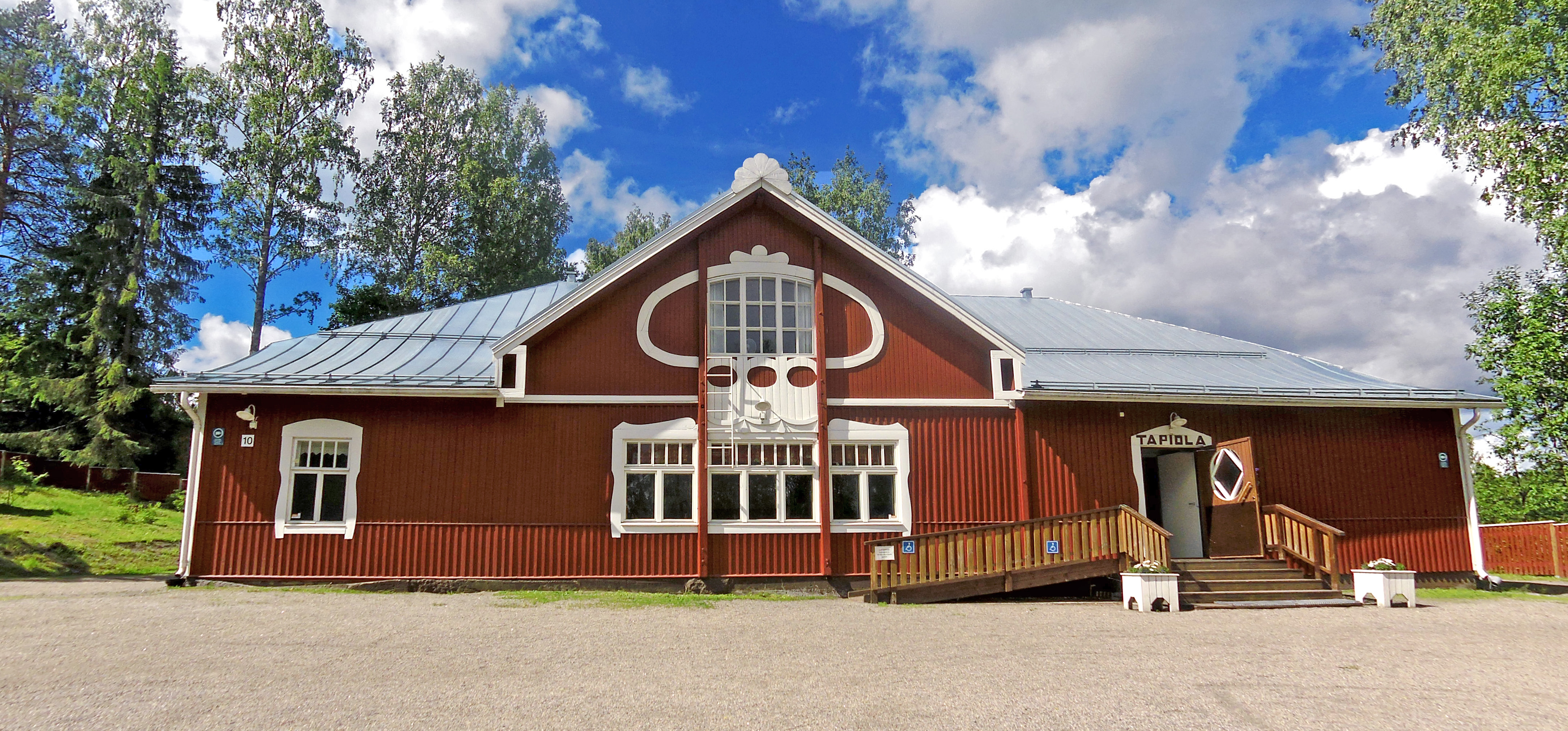
"Tapiola", the meeting hall of the Keljo youth association in Jokipakka.

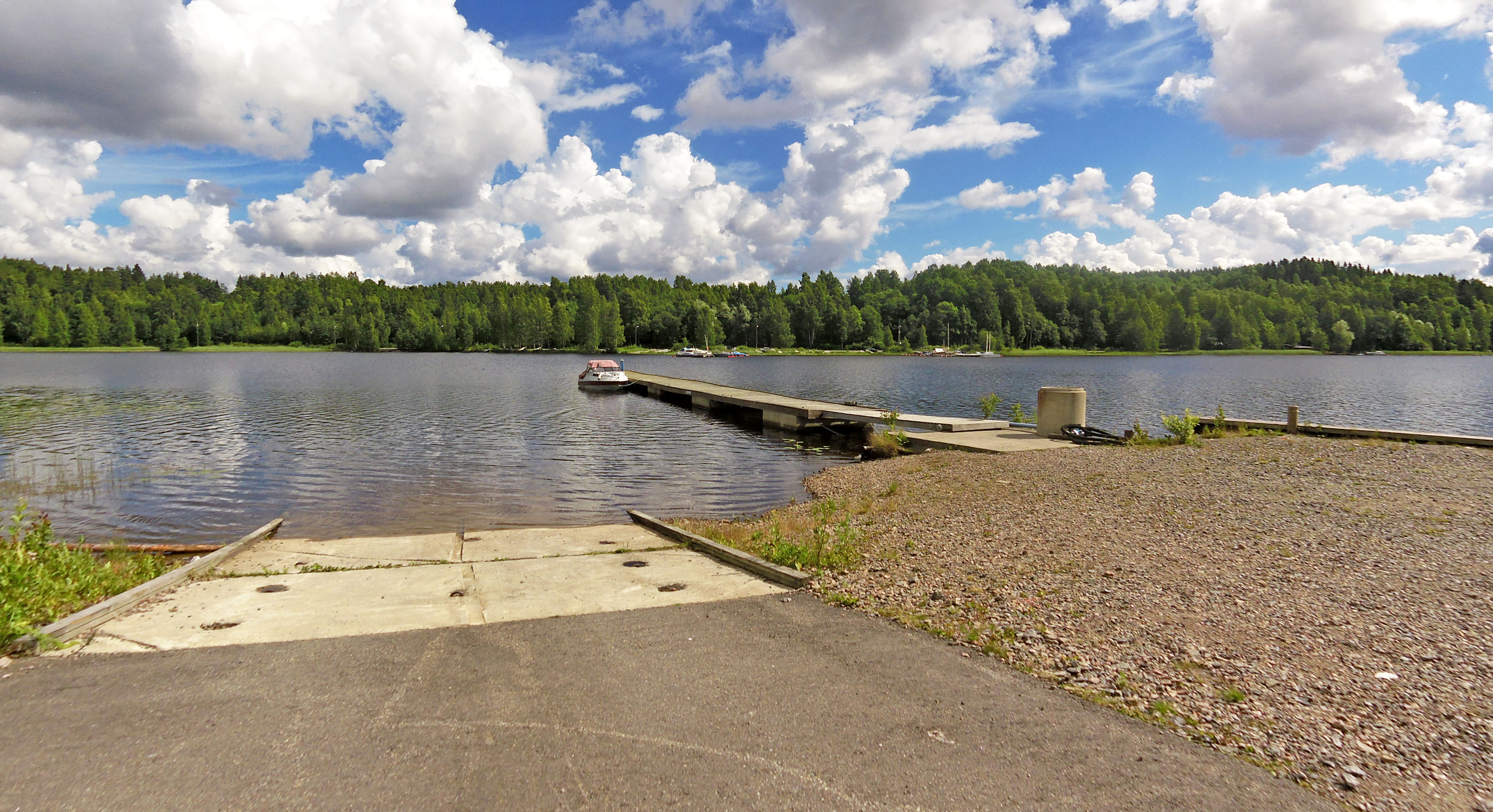
View from the Harakkasaari towards Sippulanniemi (Ristikivi) over the Päijänne.

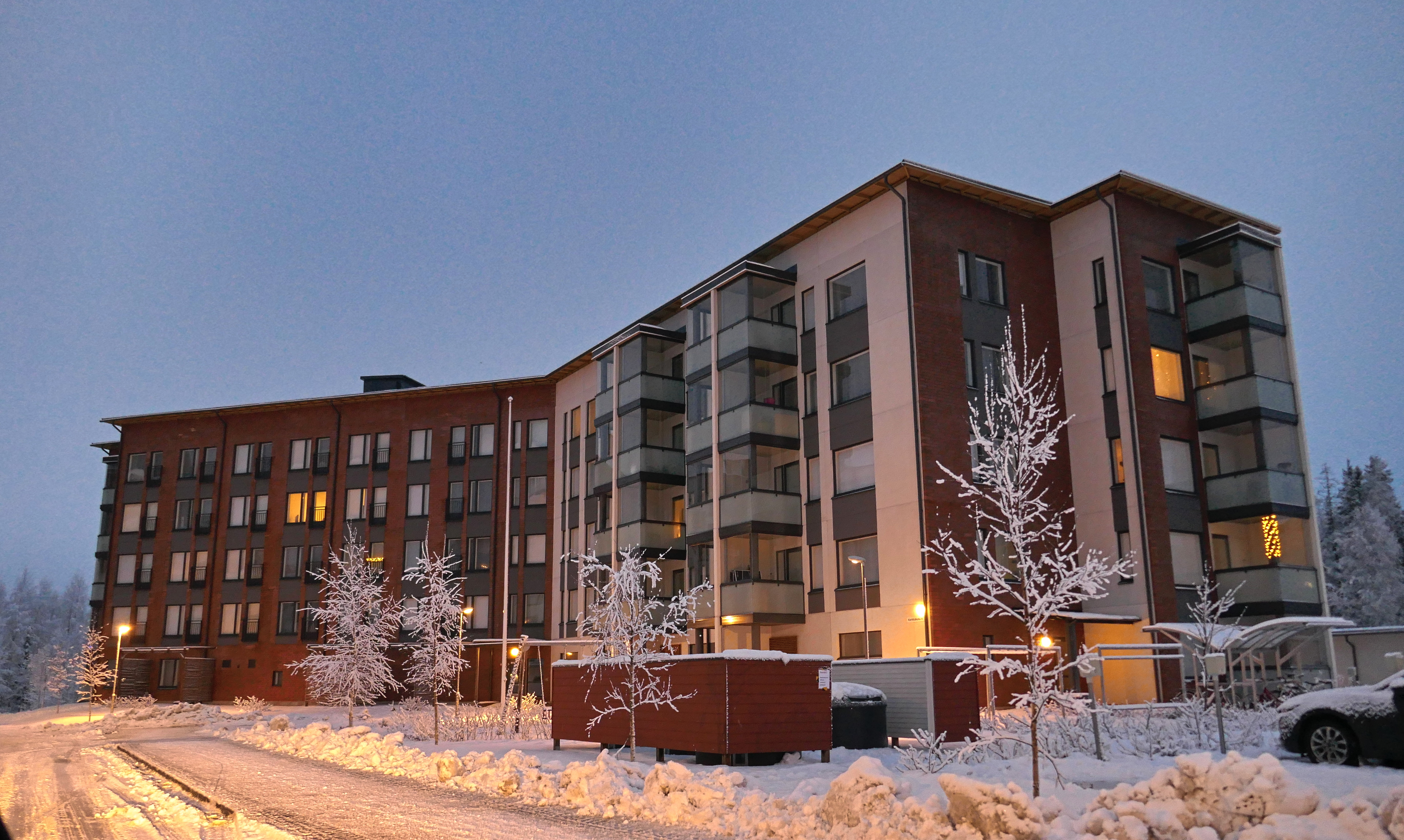
Apartments by the Kerkkäkatu in central Keljonkangas.

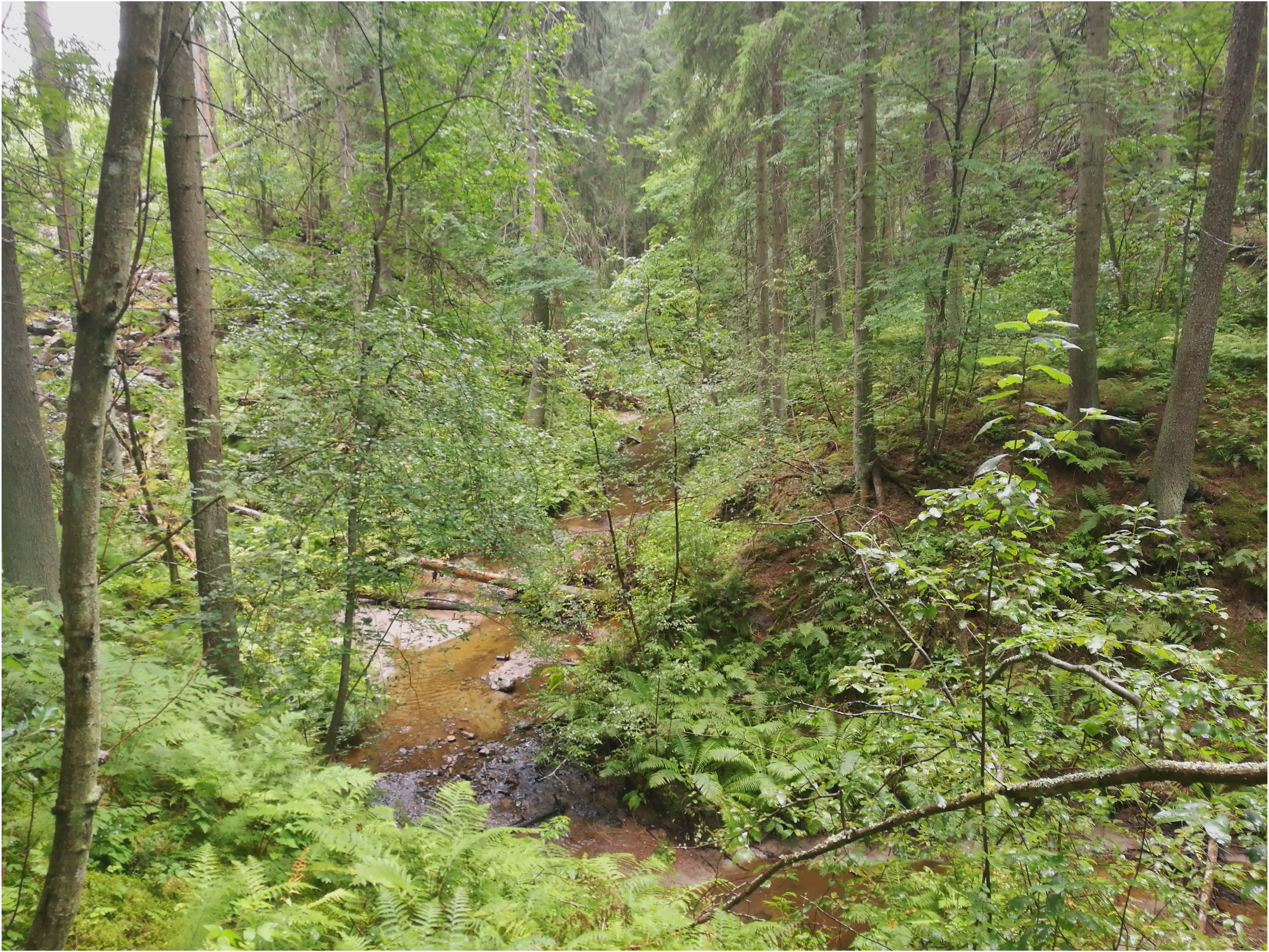
The river Joppakanjoki.
