= Keltinmäki =

- District of Jyväskylä
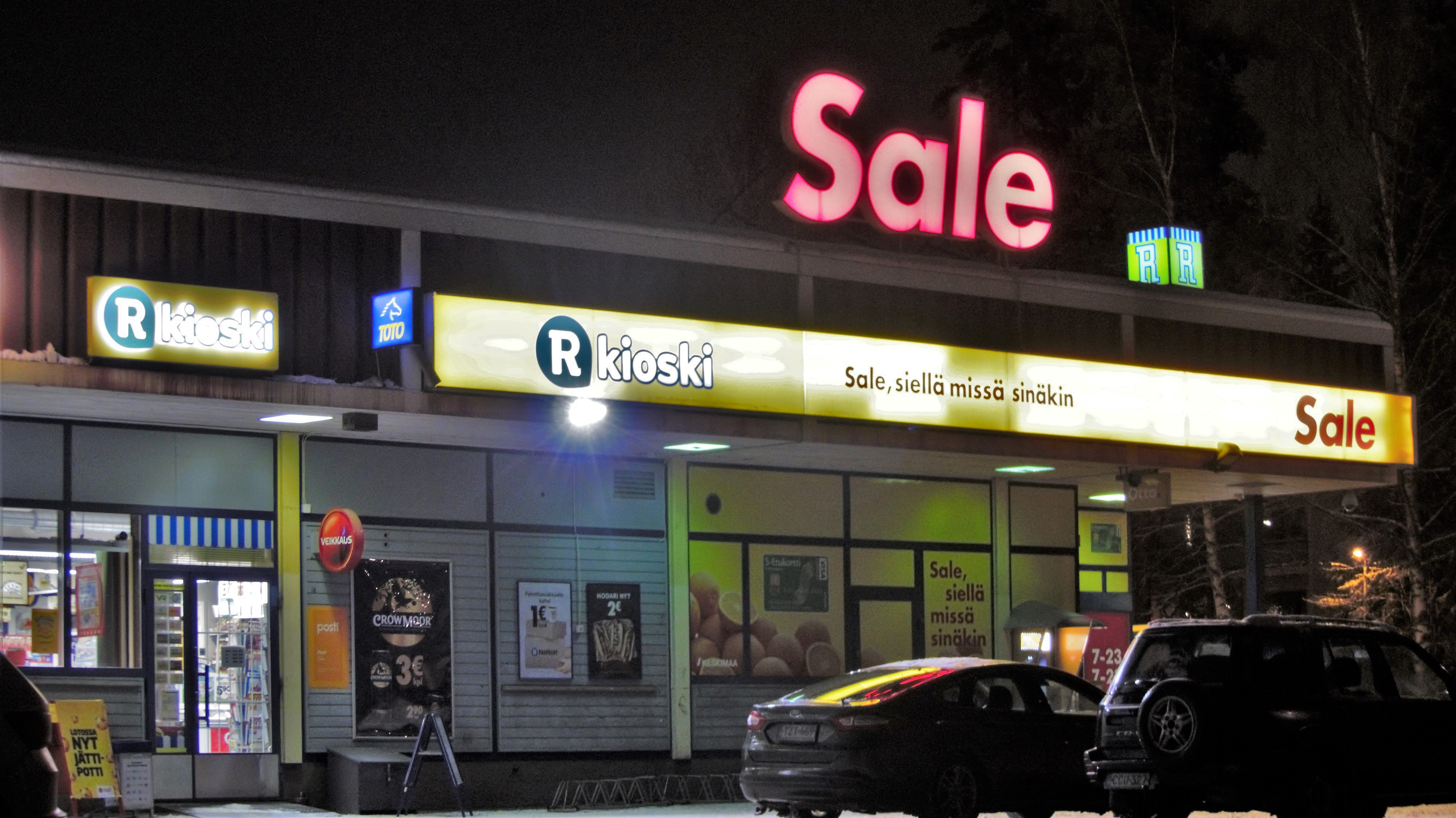
- A shopping mall in the center of Keltinmäki.
- Interactive map of Keltinmäki
- Coordinates: 62°13′45.27″N 25°40′53.07″E
- Country: Finland
- Province: Western Finland
- Region: Central Finland
- Sub-region: Jyväskylä sub-region
- City: Jyväskylä
- Ward: Keltinmäki-Myllyjärvi

Population (2021-12-31)
  - Total: 4,010
  - Keltinkeskus only: 2,402
- Time zone: UTC+2 (EET)
  - Summer (DST): UTC+3 (EEST)
- Postal code: 40640

Keltinmäki is a district of Jyväskylä, Finland. It is located about 5–6 kilometers southwest of the city center. Keltinmäki was built mostly during the 1970s, but some areas in the district were built in the 1980s–2000s. The residential buildings in Keltinmäki are mostly apartment buildings and row houses, but there are also some single-family house neighborhoods in the area.

The official district of Keltinmäki also includes the suburbs of Mäyrämäki, Mustalampi, Ylä-Mäyrämäki, Myllyjärvi and Ylä-Myllyjärvi (Ylämyllyjärvi).

== History ==
As the borders of farms were defined in the Great Partition, the area of modern Keltinmäki was divided between various farms in the village of Jyväskylä such as Ristonmaa and Hovila. The Hanhijoki territory, which included the western part of modern Keltinmäki and most of Valkeamäki, was also defined during the partition. It was eventually acquired by the Nisula farm. The Mäyrämäki farm was established as a tenure farm of Nisula.

In the early 20th century, small residential areas began to emerge on the territory of Jyväskylän maalaiskunta. In the 1950s, the residential area of Pirunkorpi developed near the Mäyrämäki farm and eventually came to be known as Mäyrämäki. The area was transferred to the town of Jyväskylä in 1965.

In the zoning plan of 1968, the areas of Keljo, Keljonkangas and Keltinmäki were designated as the primary direction of urban growth for the town of Jyväskylä. Keltinmäki proper (Keltinkeskus) was largely built in the 1970s, becoming a suburb dominated by apartments. Modern Mäyrämäki was developed in the 1980s, which was followed by the construction of the newer Mustalampi and Ylä-Mäyrämäki suburbs in the 2000s.

== Church ==
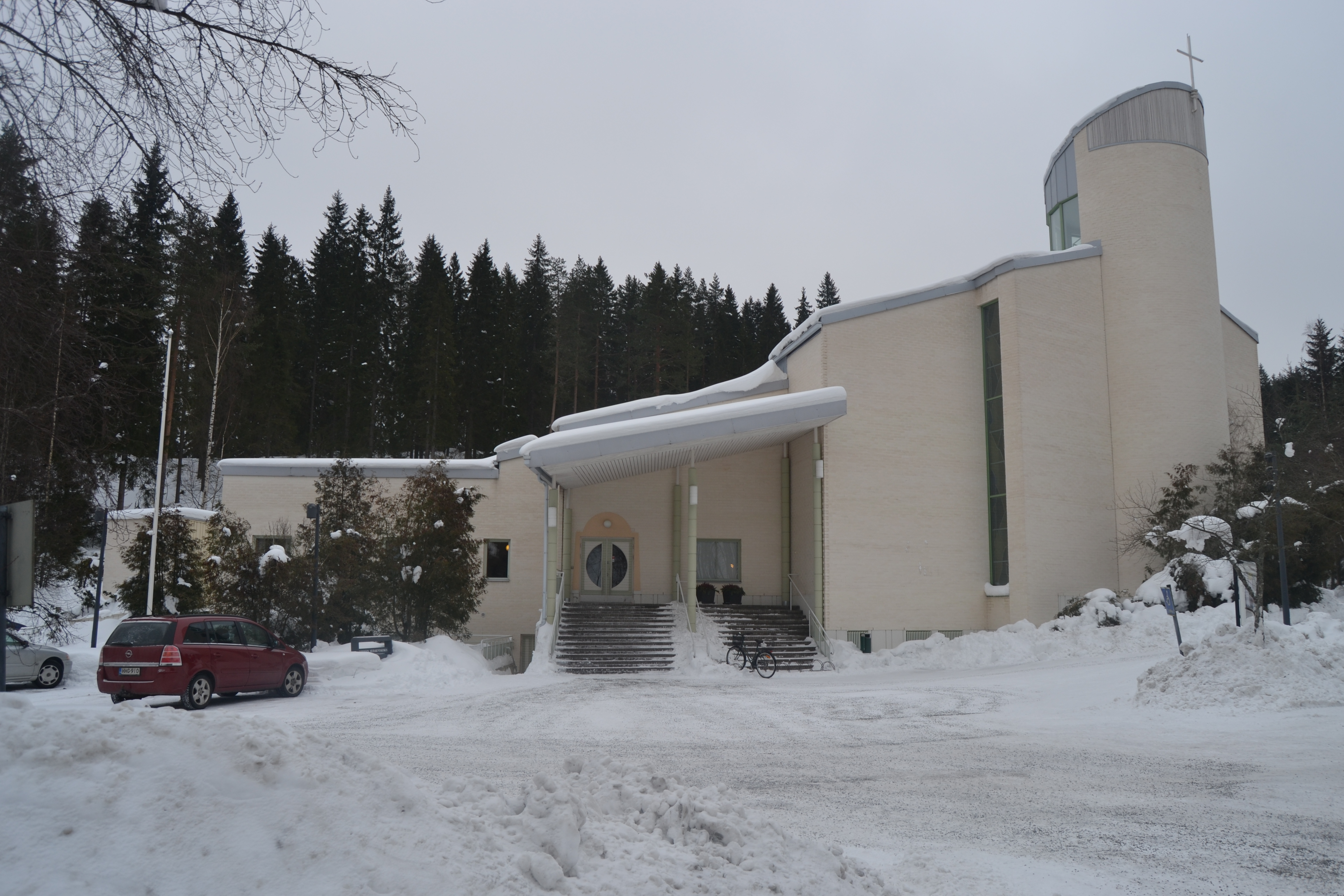

The Keltinmäki Church was built in 1991–1992. It was designed by the architect Olavi Noronen. The altarpiece was made by Penni Rainio.

The church has two bells: one of the bells has the word tulkaa (come) written on it, while the other one reads menkää (go), commanding people to spread the gospel to everyone.

== Gallery ==
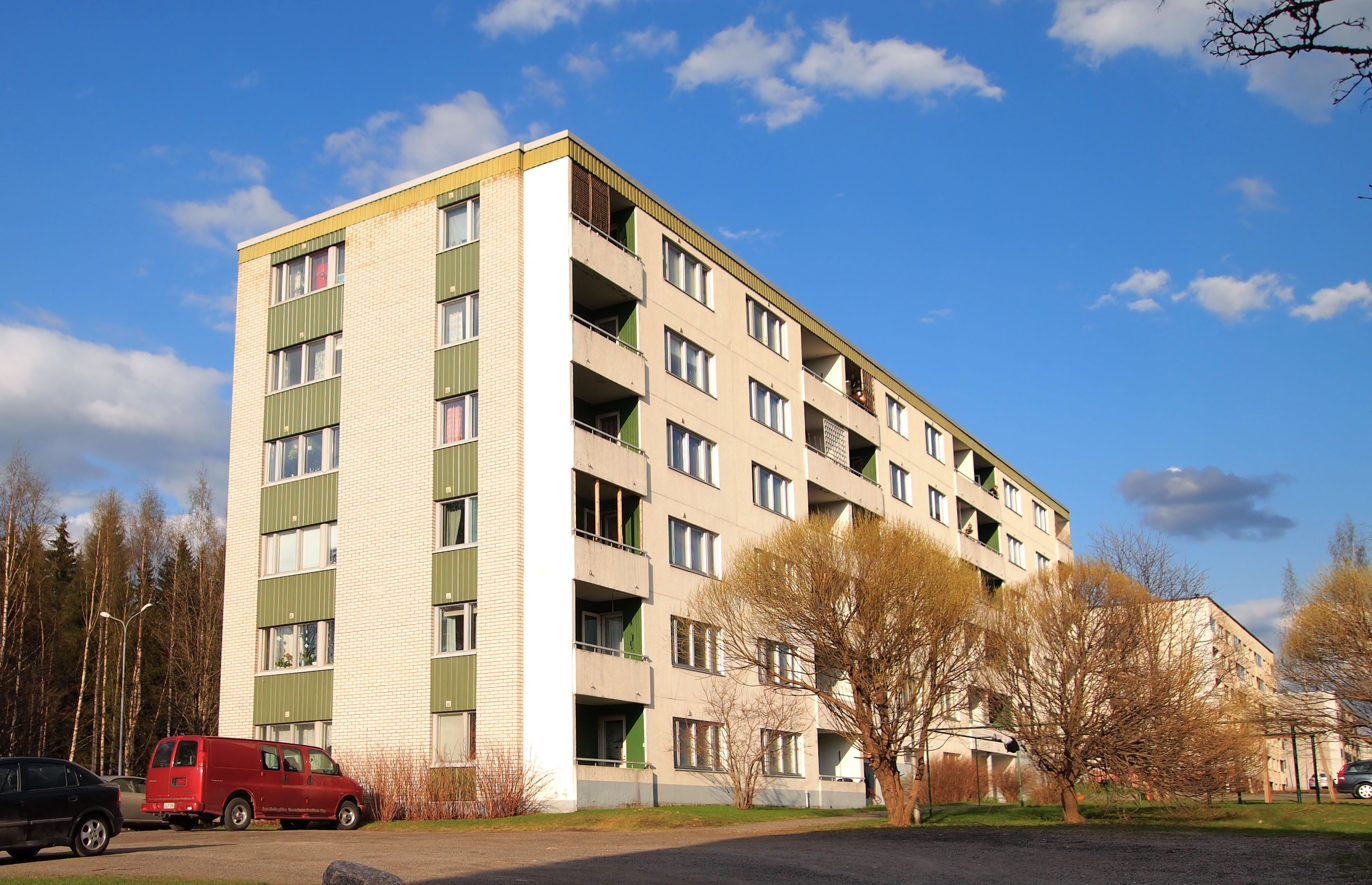
Apartment buildings on street Keltinmäentie.

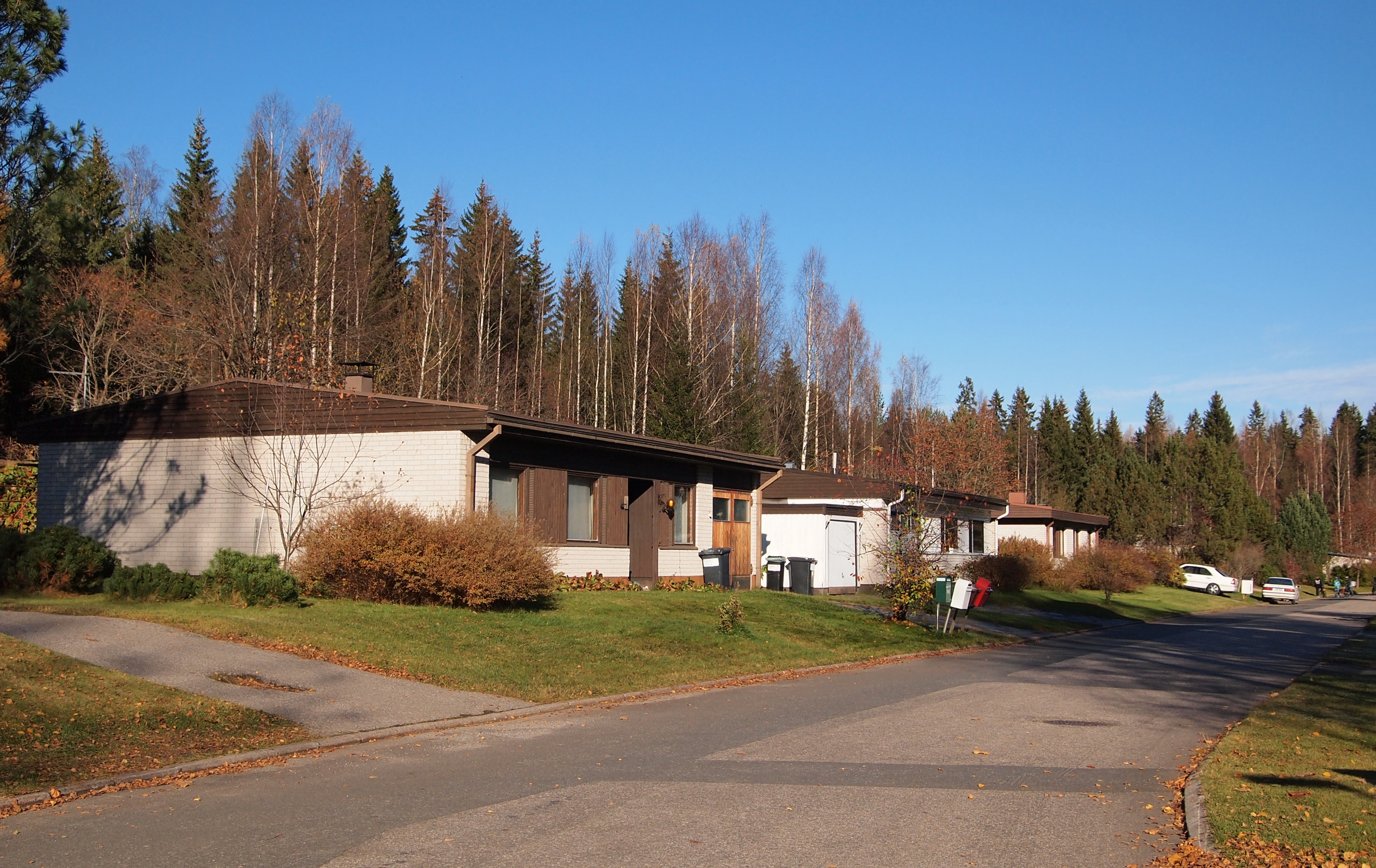
Single-family houses in the Mäyrämäki neighborhood.

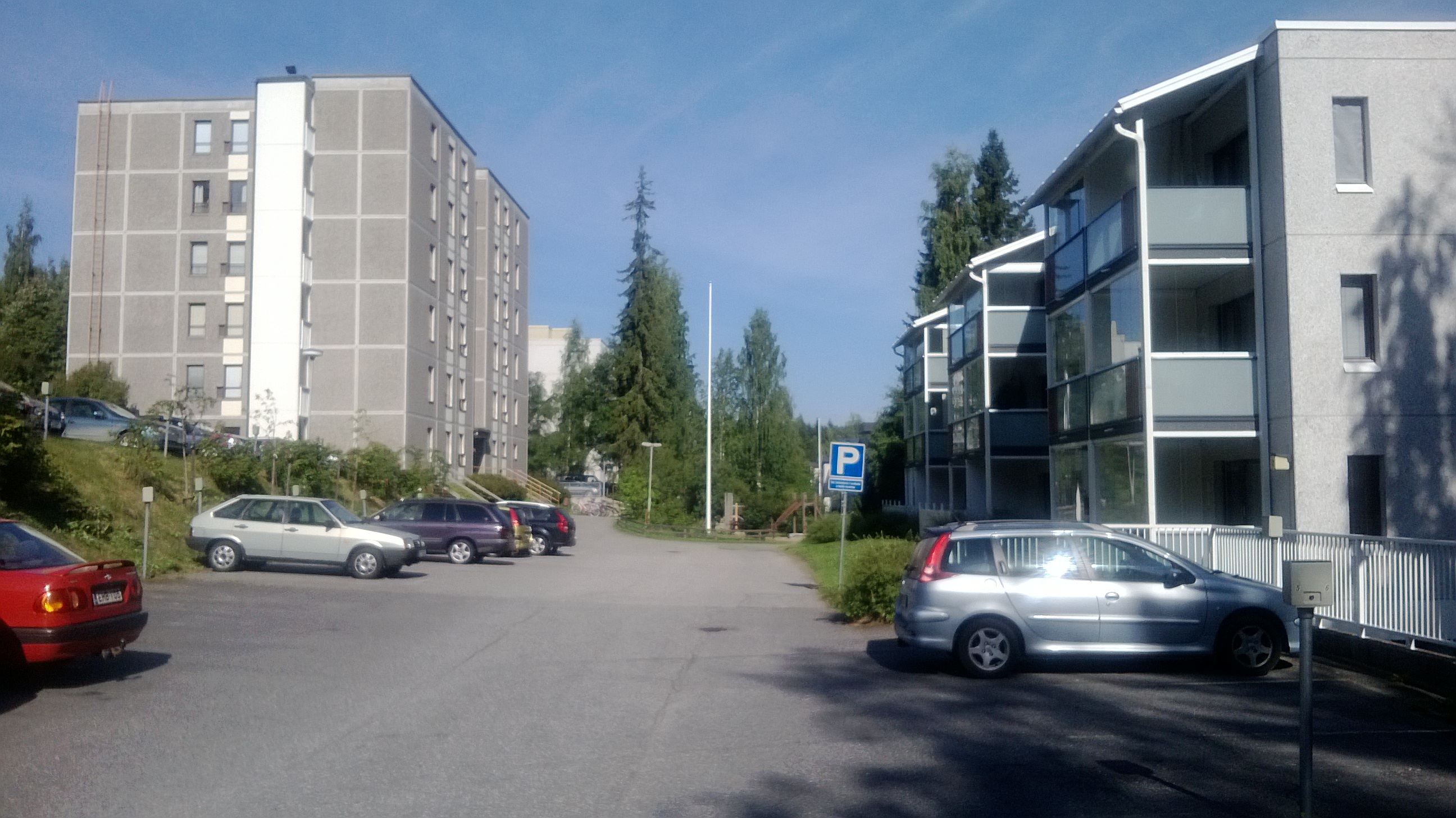
Apartment buildings in the Myllyjärvi neighborhood.

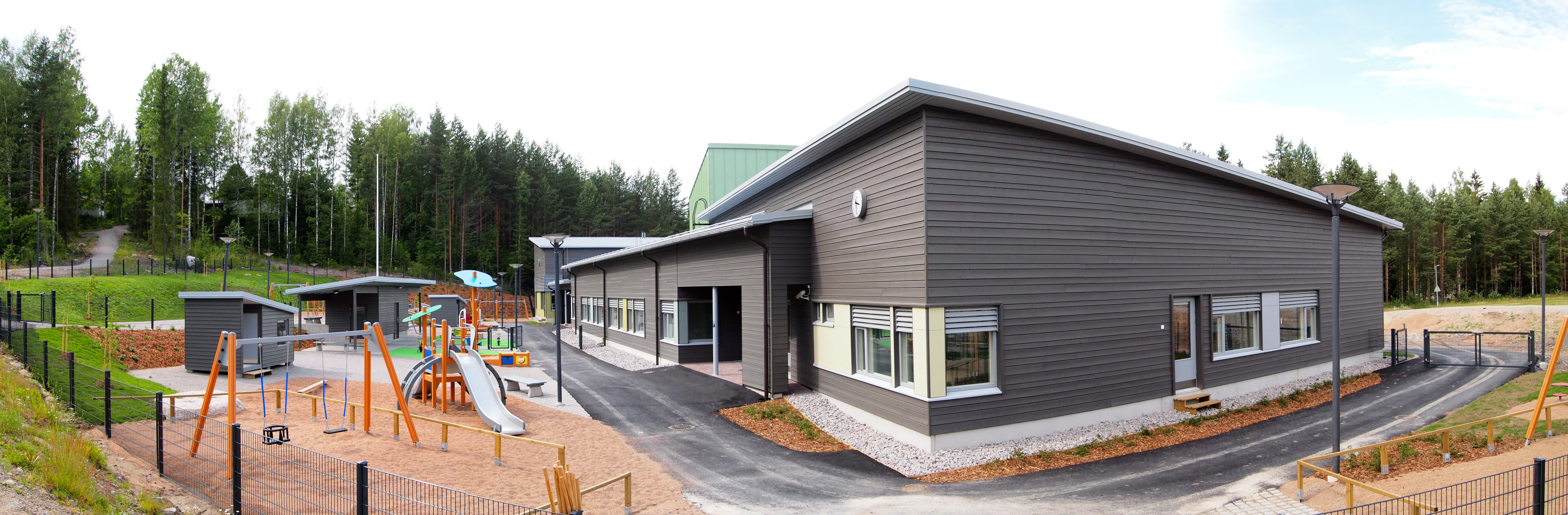
A nursery school in Keltinmäki.
