= Vaajakoski-Jyskä =

Coordinates: 62°14′54″N 25°52′16″E

- Ward of Jyväskylä
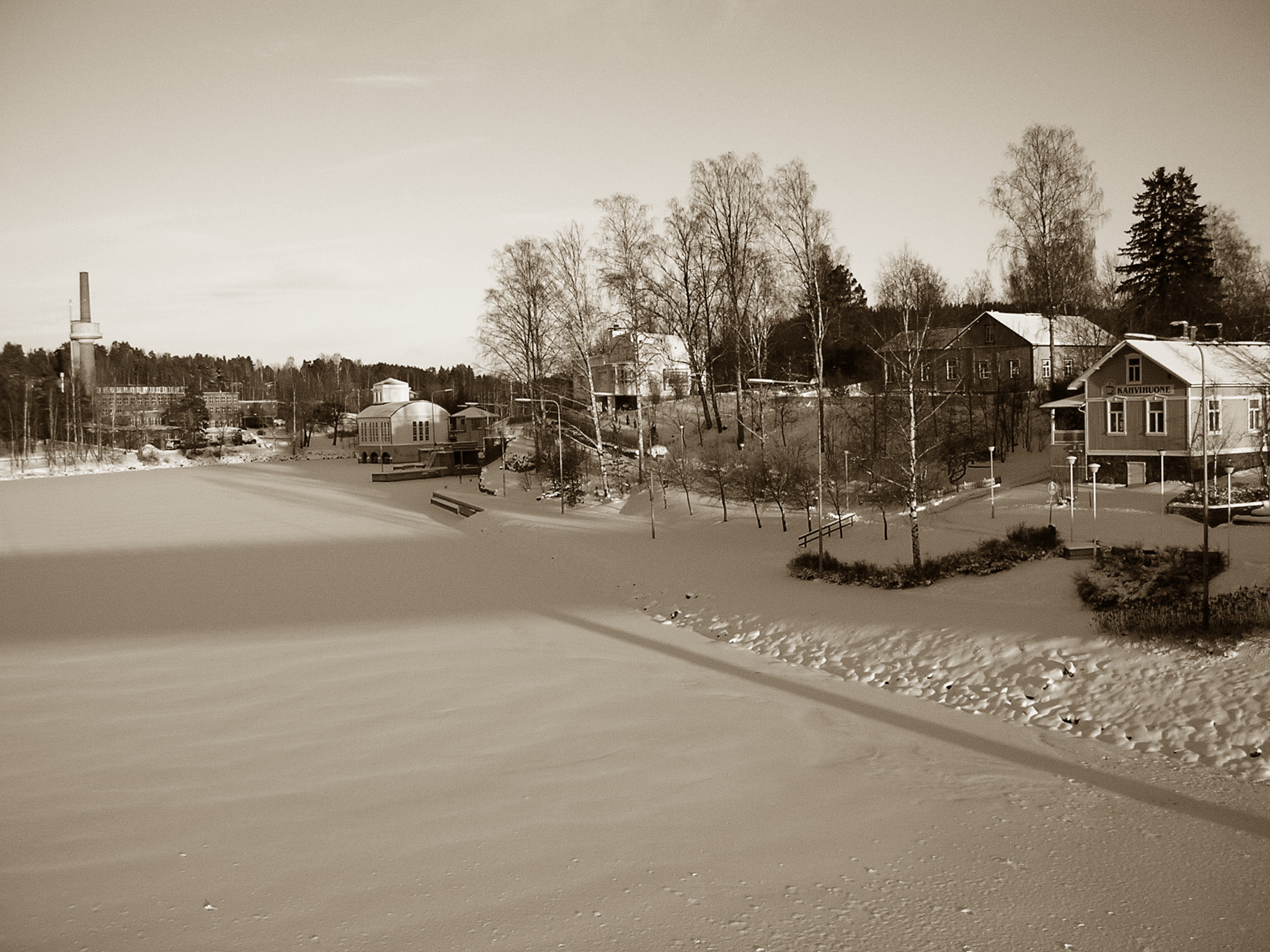
- A view from Naissaari in Vaajakoski
- Country: Finland
- Province: Western Finland
- Region: Central Finland
- Sub-region: Jyväskylä sub-region
- City: Jyväskylä
- Ward: Vaajakoski-Jyskä

Population (2011)
  - Total: 14.588
- Time zone: UTC+2 (EET)
  - Summer (DST): UTC+3 (EEST)
- Postal code: 40800 VAAJAKOSKI

Vaajakoski-Jyskä is a ward of Jyväskylä, Finland. It is located seven kilometres from the city centre on both sides of Vaajavirta river on the Northern end of lake Päijänne and on the Western end of Lake Leppävesi. As of July 2011 the population of Vaajakoski-Jyskä was 14.588. Before 2009 Vaajakoski-Jyskä belonged to Jyväskylän maalaiskunta.

In spoken language the name Vaajakoski is used to describe big parts of Vaajakoski-Jyskä ward.

The Vaajakoski-Jyskä ward is divided into 12 different neighbourhoods.

== Population of neighbourhoods of Vaajakoski-Jyskä in 2007 ==
Vaajakoski, (population 1503); Jyskä (2531); Savonmäki (1339); Tammirinne (2273)	Tölskä (706); Väinölä (1896); Kivilampi (451); Haapaniemi (942)	Kaunisharju (1301); Kanavuori (738); Leppälahti (649); Oravasaari (352)

== Gallery ==
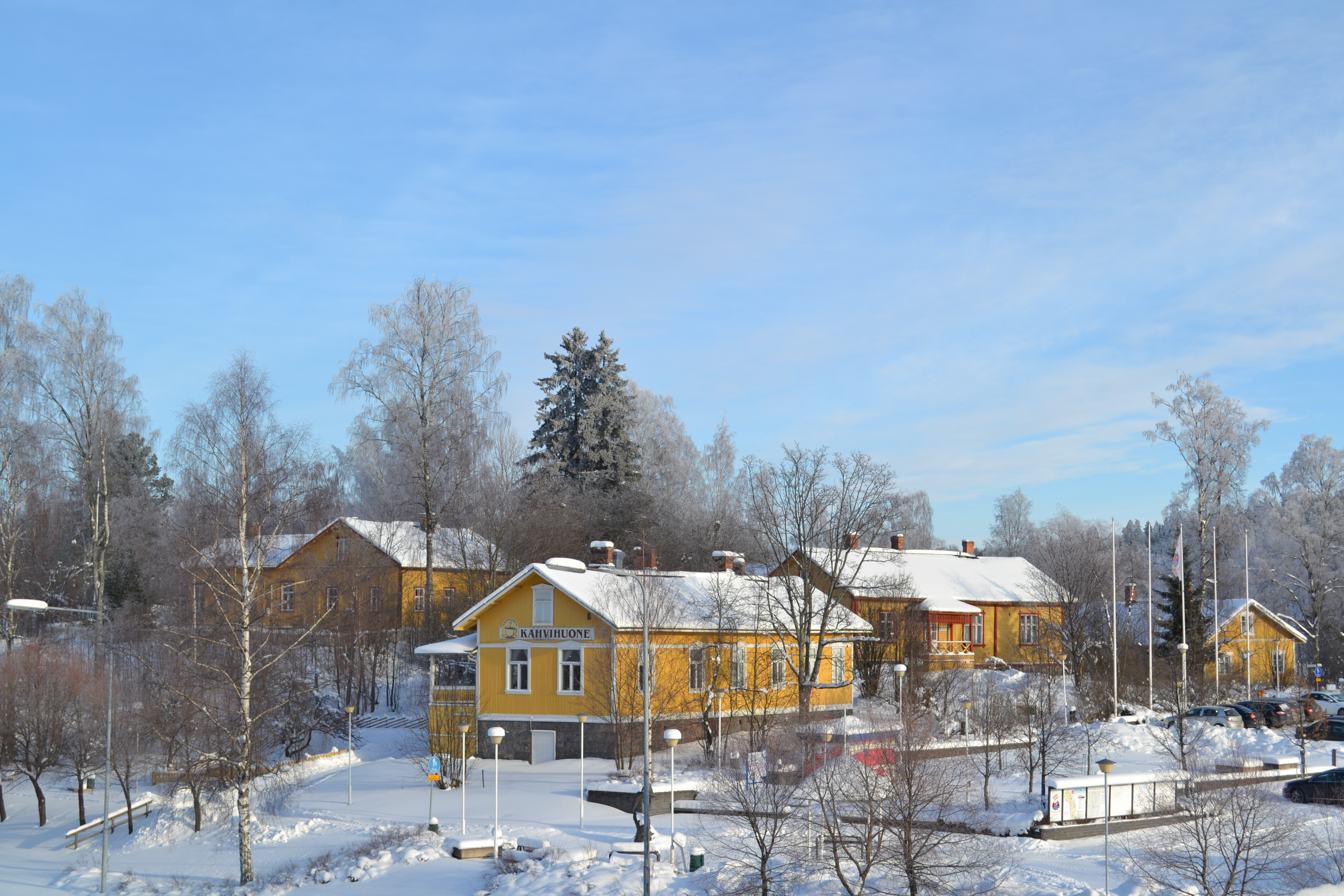
Naissaari, Vaajakoski

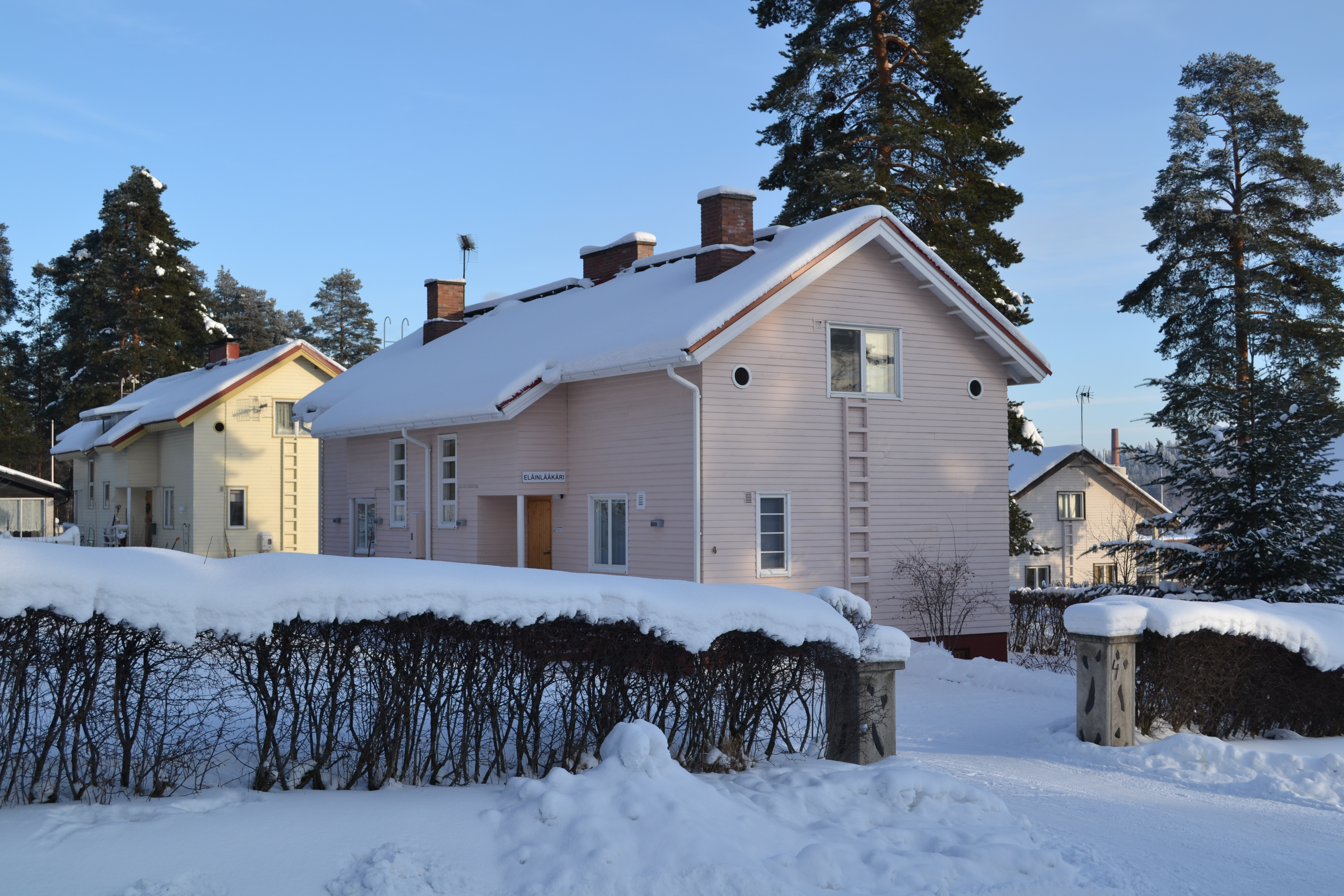
Semi-detached houses of Kakaravaara in Northern Vaajakoski

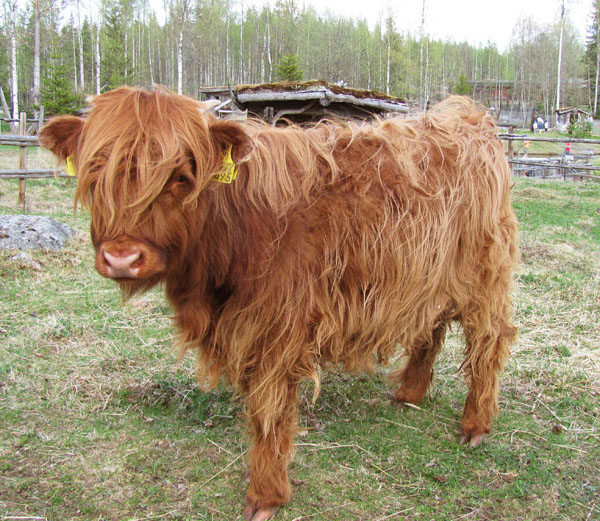
A highland cattle at Ysitien Lemmikki Zoo in Leppälahti

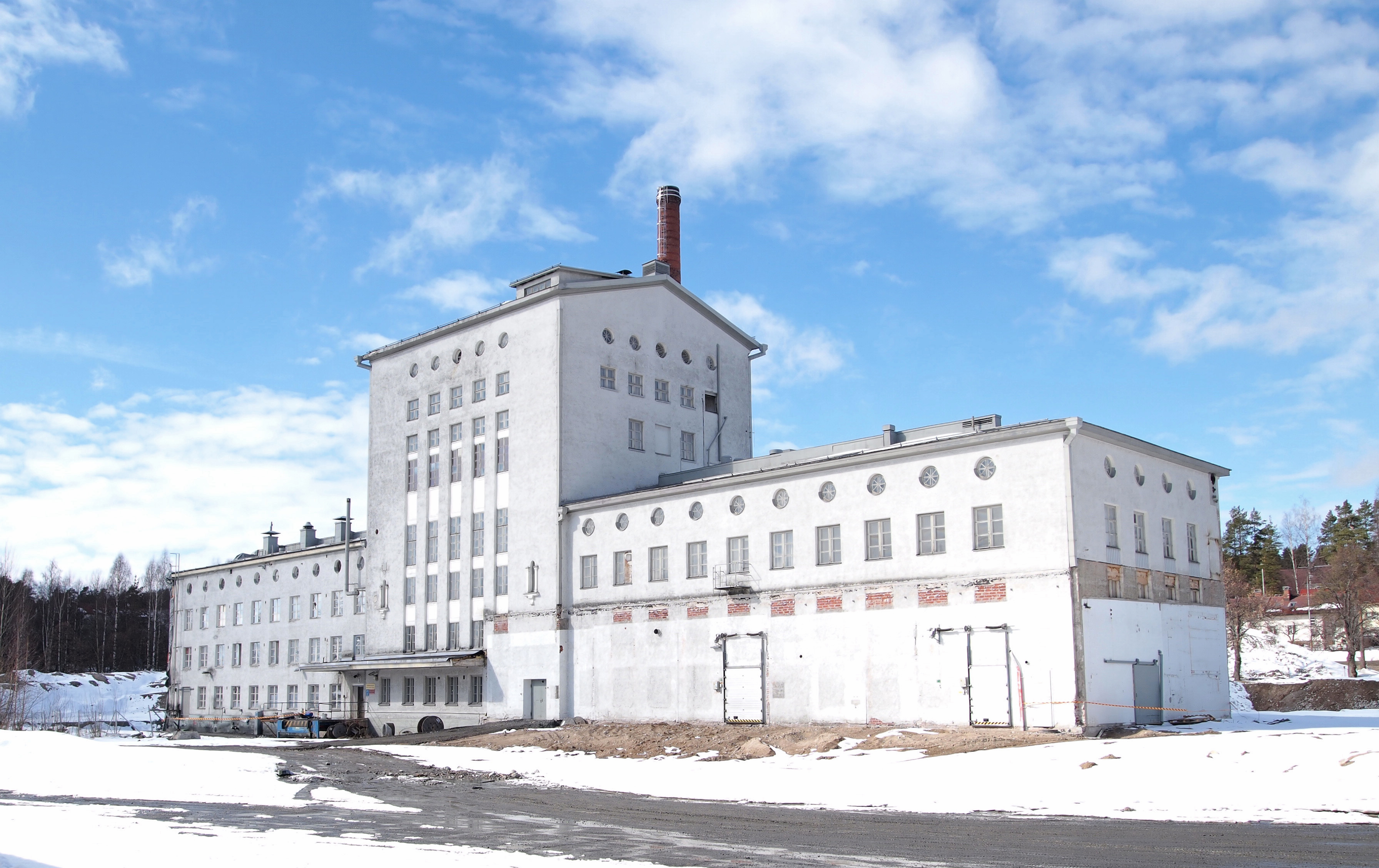
Panda candy factory in Vaajakoski

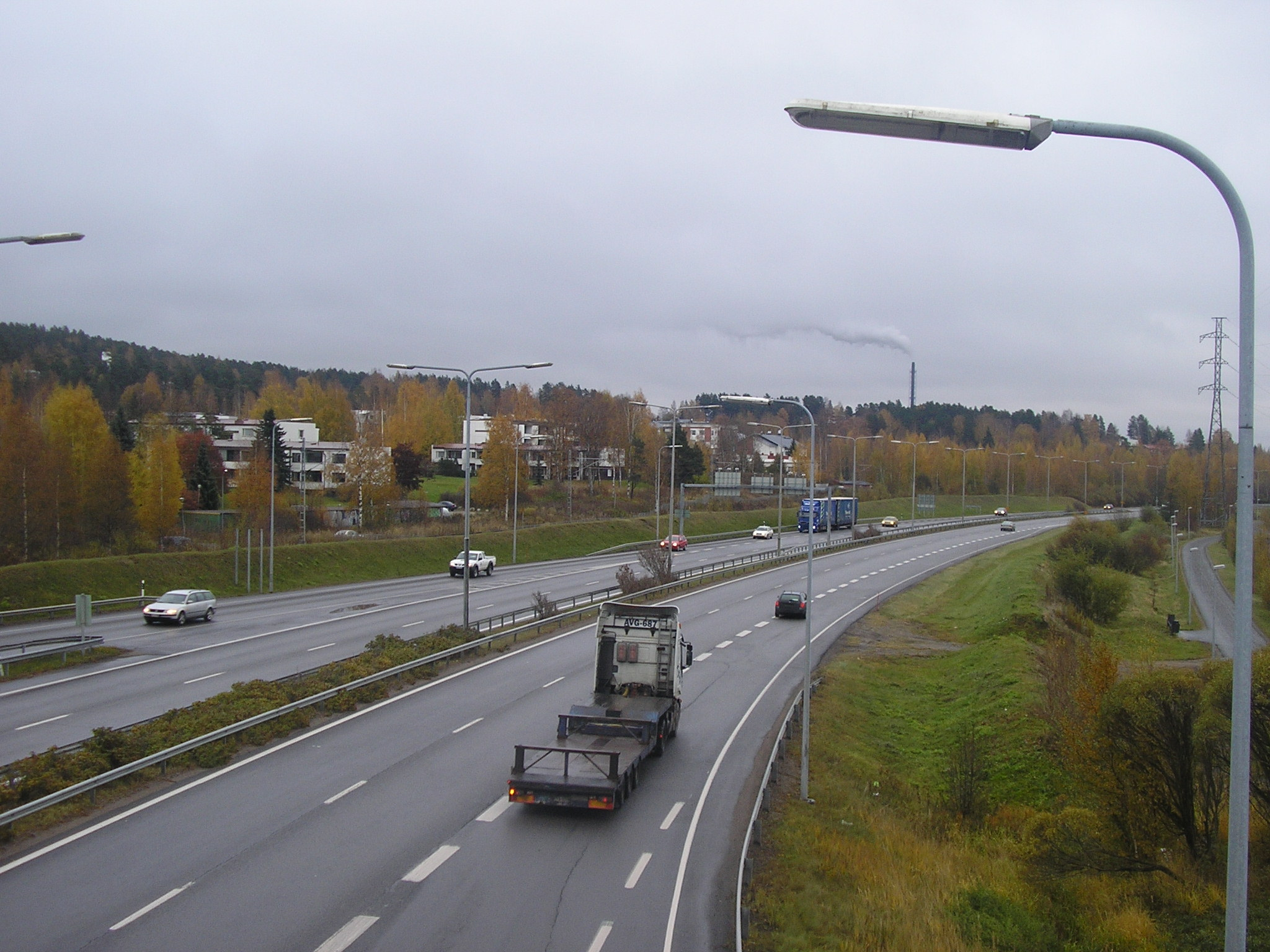
Vaajakoski Motorway

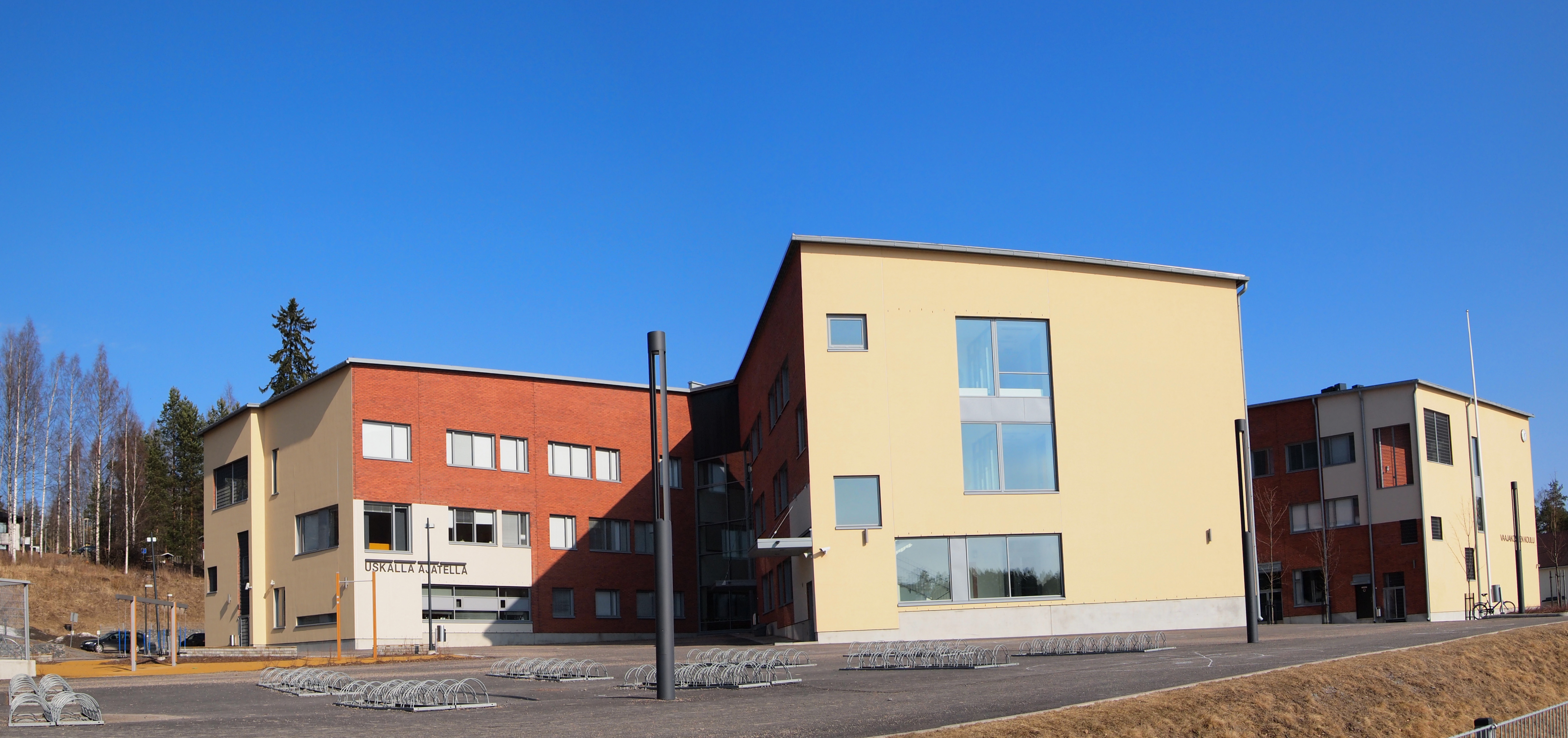
Vaajakoski Junior Highschool

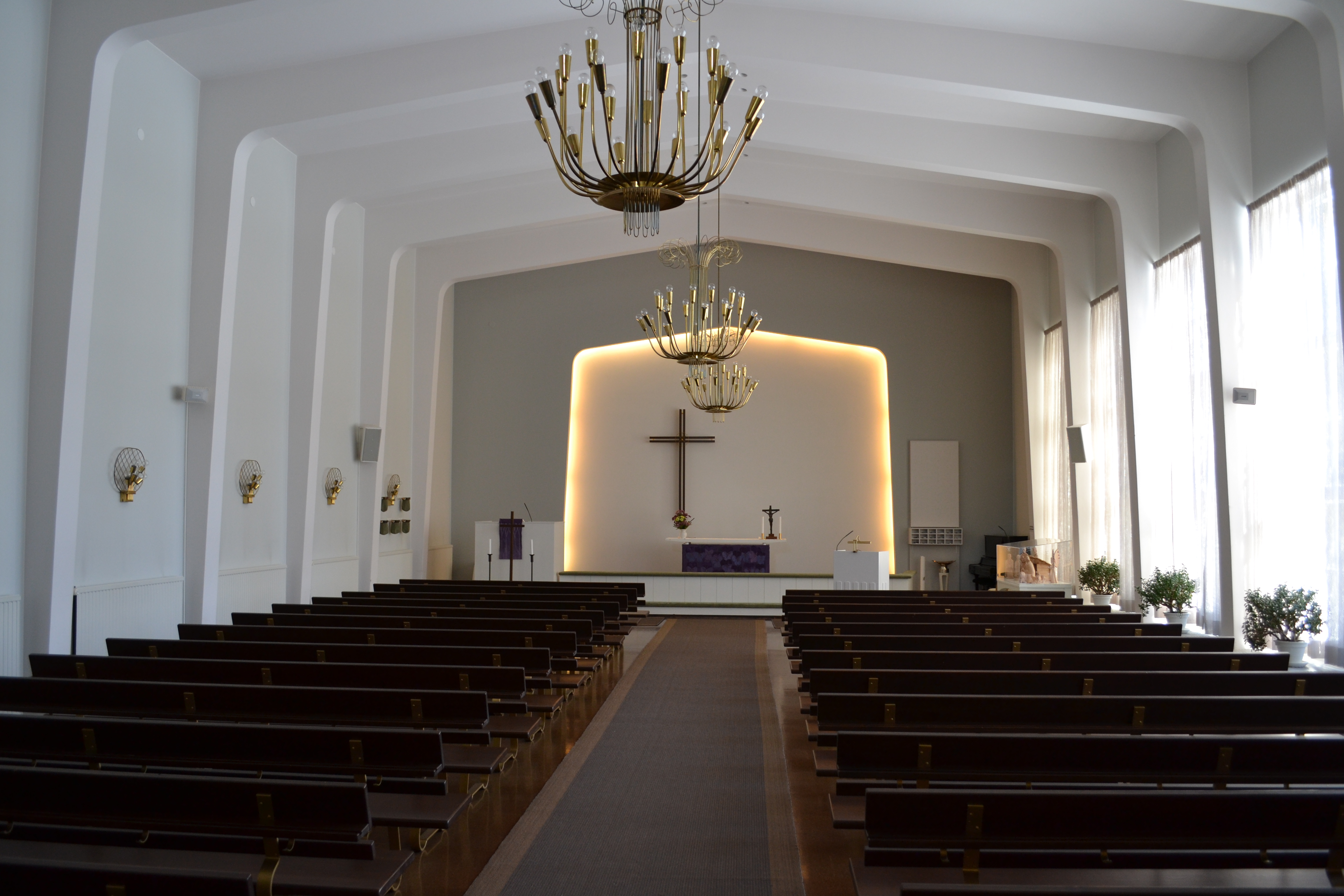
Interior of Vaajakoski Lutheran Church

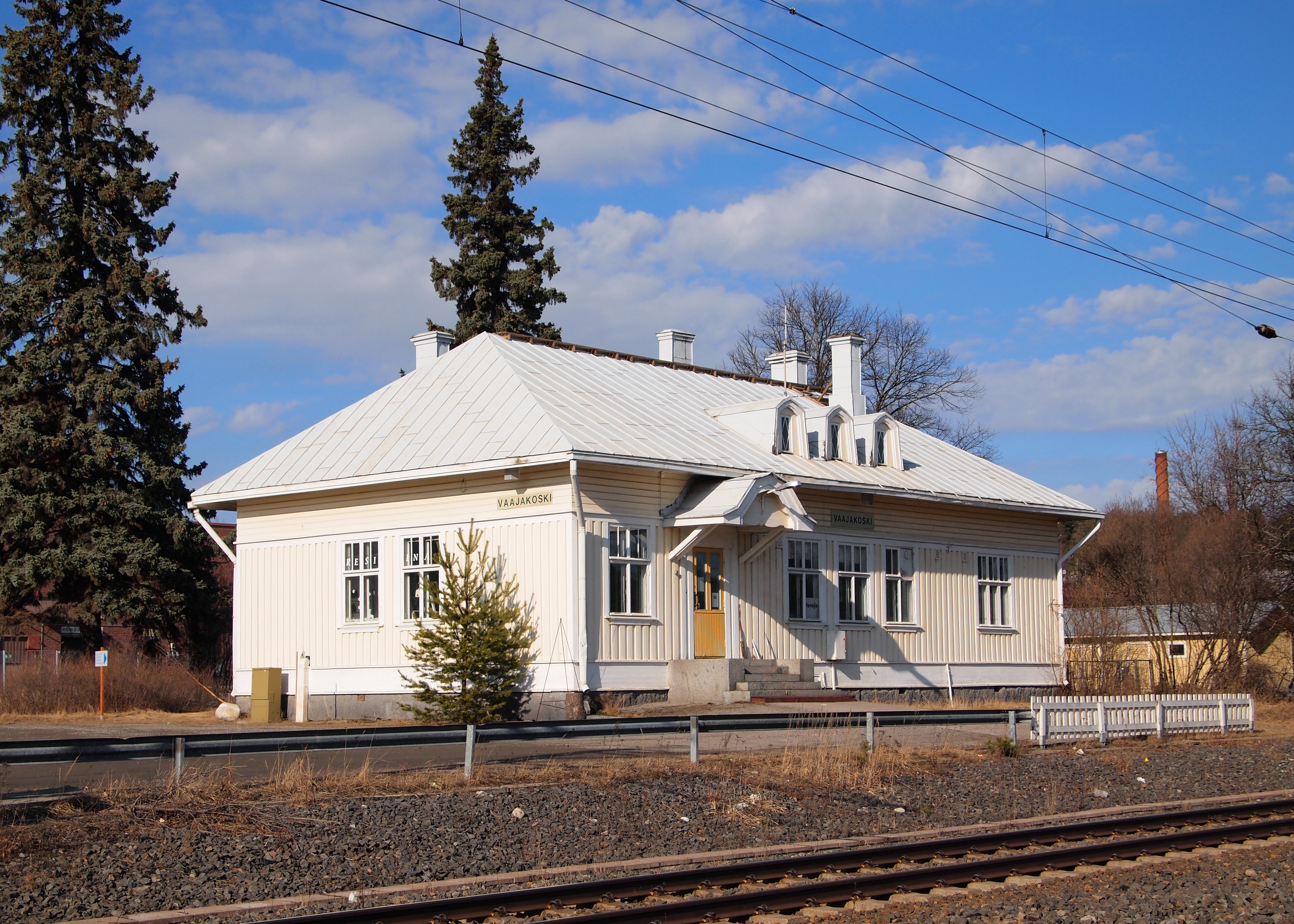
Vaajakoski Railway Station

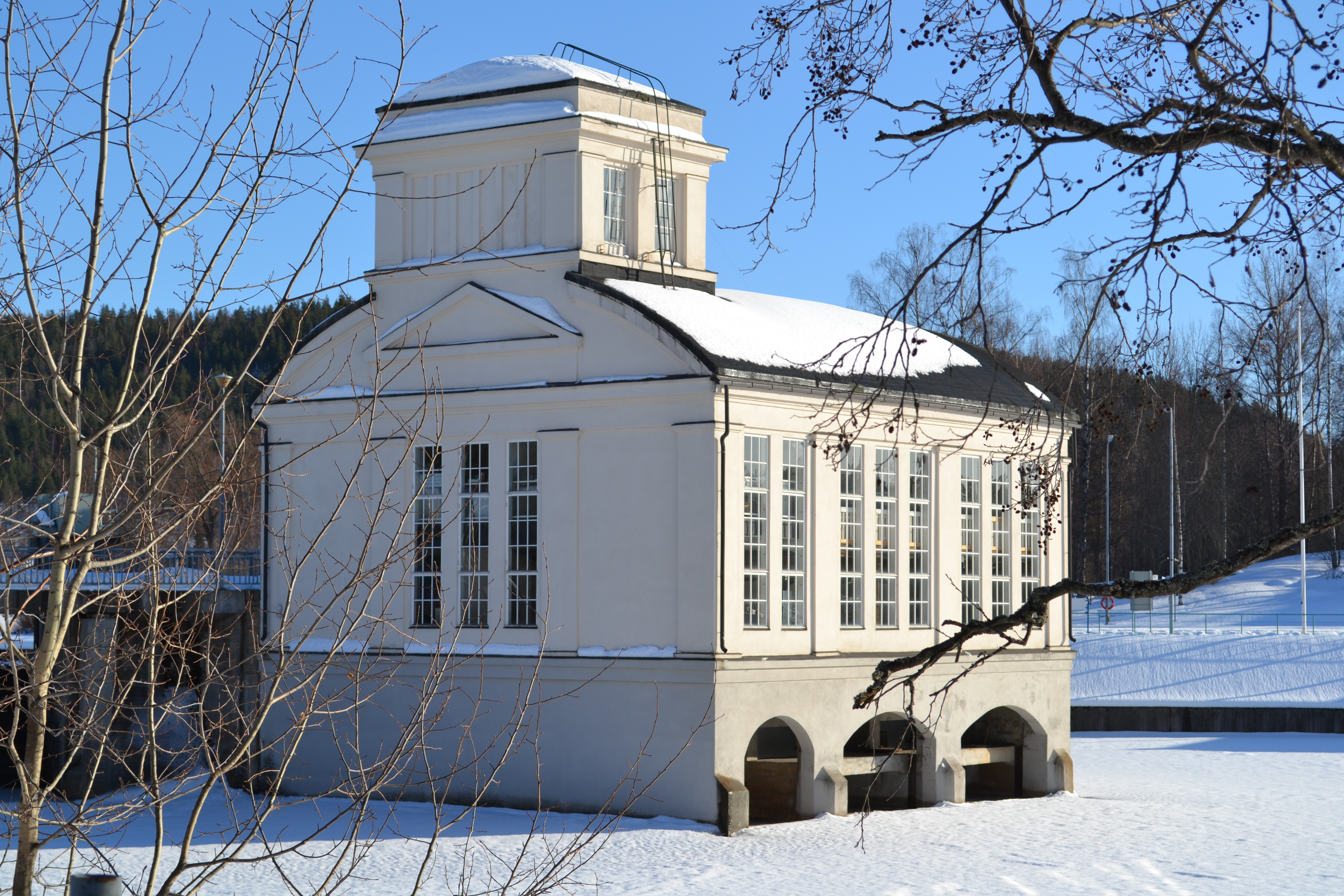
Vaajakoski Old Power Station

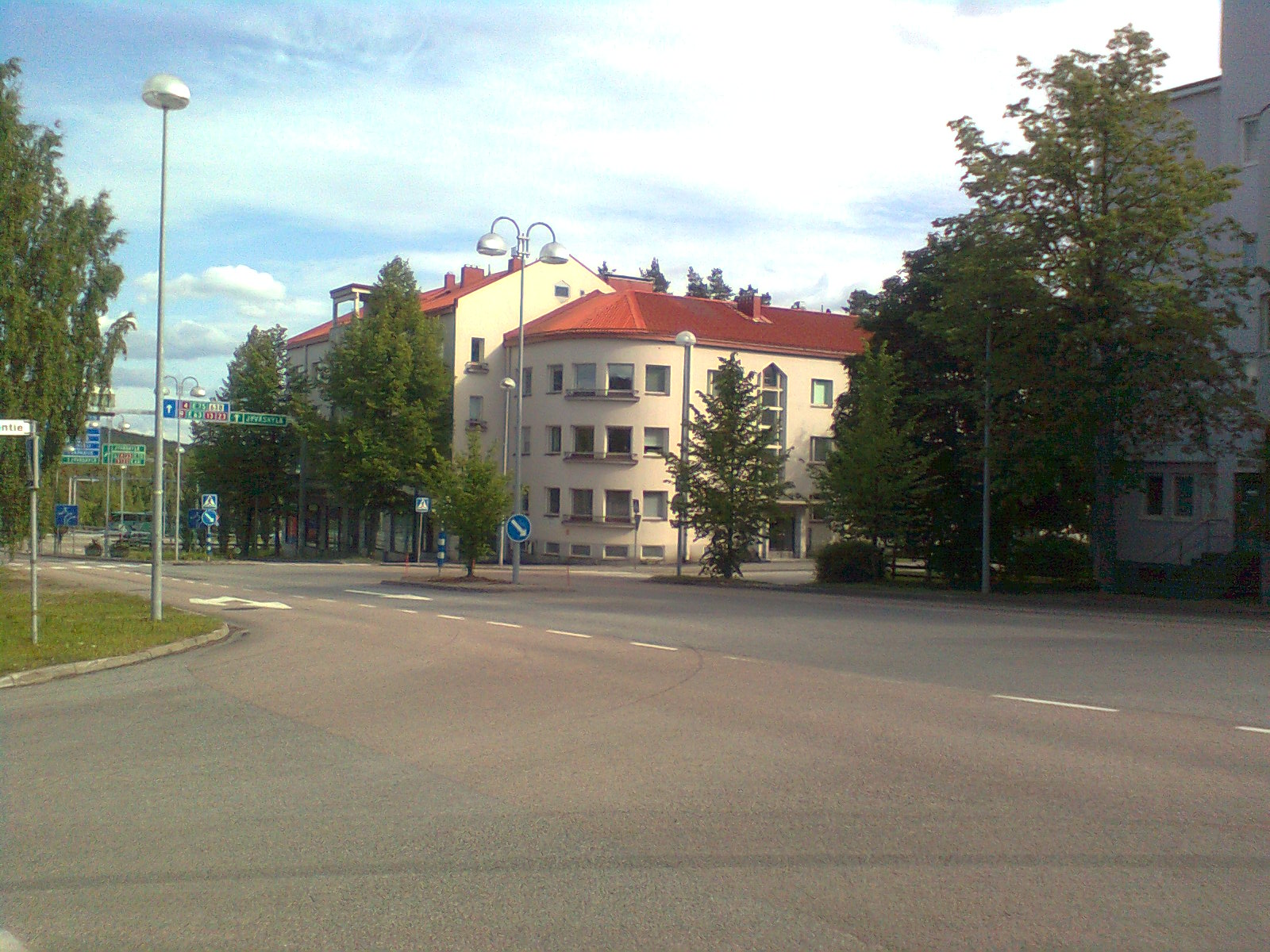
Wesmanninmäki
