= Vaajakoski railway station =

Railway station in Jyväskylä, Finland

Vaajakoski
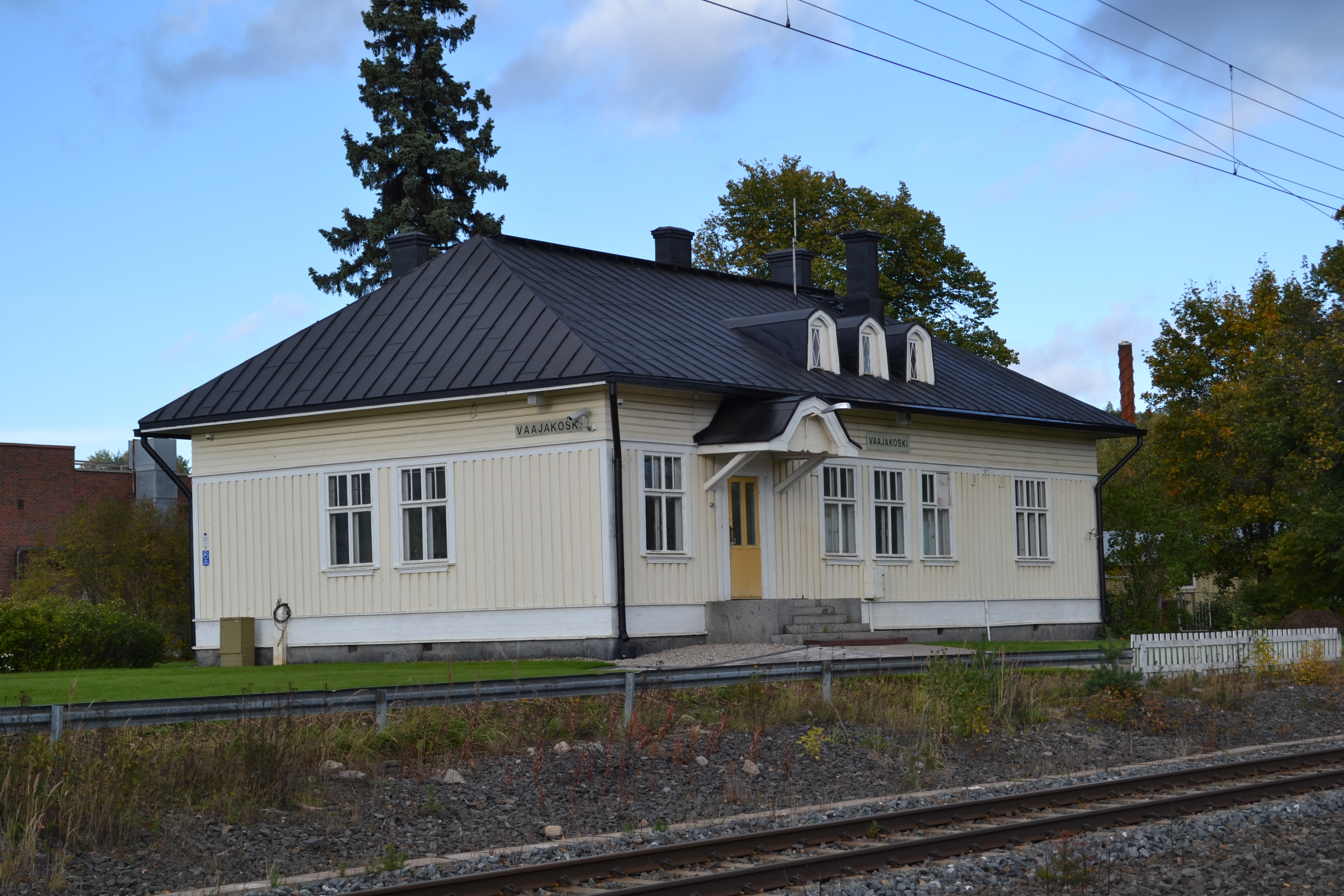
- Vaajakoski in 2015

General information
- Location: Asematie 3, 40800; Vaajakoski, Jyväskylä; Finland
- Coordinates: 62°14′52″N 025°52′45″E
- System: VR freight station
- Owner: Finnish Transport Infrastructure Agency
- Line: Jyväskylä–Pieksämäki
- Train operators: VR Group

Other information
- Station code: Vko
- Classification: Operating point

History
- Opened: 1 June 1918
- Closed: 31 May 1992 (passenger services only)
Location

The Vaajakoski railway station (Finnish: Vaajakosken rautatieasema, Swedish: Vaajakoski järnvägsstation) is a station located in the district of Vaajakoski in the city of Jyväskylä (formerly the rural municipality of Jyväskylä), Finland. It is located along the Jyväskylä–Pieksämäki railway, and has since 1992 only served freight traffic, as well as a passing loop; the nearest station with passenger services is Jyväskylä in the west.

The Finnish Heritage Agency has proclaimed the industrial community of Vaajakoski as a built cultural environment of national significance.

== History ==
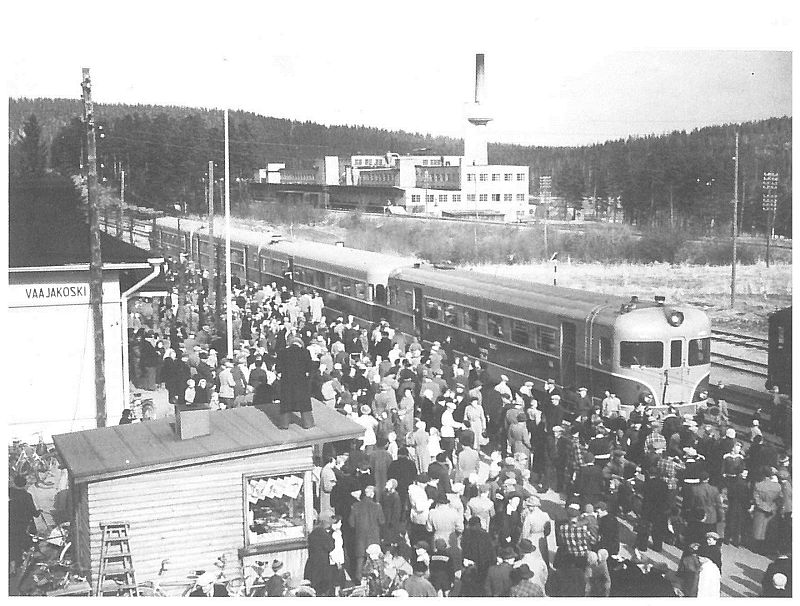
Vaajakoski in 1954

Before the completion of the Jyväskylä–Pieksämäki railway, people travelled from Vaajakoski to Jyväskylä by ferry, horse-drawn carriage and on foot. The Vaajakoski railway station was opened in 1918. Bus services from Vaajakoski to Jyväskylä began in 1925. Ferry services were discontinued in 1928 due to the increasing popularity of trains and buses.

The number of passenger trains stopping at Vaajakoski was twenty a day in 1965, twelve in 1975 and only seven in 1985. The number was reduced to three in the spring of 1988 upon the retirement of the Dm7 railbuses. The station was made unstaffed in May 1990, and the last trains ceased to call in Vaajakoski on 31 May 1992.

Vaajakoski used to be a busy freight station, but due to the closure of SOK's factories and the increase in road transport, the volume of cargo transported has decreased significantly. In 1990, 4,000 tonnes of goods arrived at and 3,000 tonnes left the station. In 1950, the corresponding figures were 24,000 tonnes and 22,000 tonnes.

The security changes at Vaajakoski were completed on 26 April 2007, when the station became remote-controlled from Pieksämäki. The first remote-controlled train encounter at the railyard took place at the turn of the day on 26-27 April, when freight trains 3035 and 4040 met at the operating point.

== Station premises ==
The station building and warehouse were built between 1914 and 1918, and were designed by architect Thure Hellström. The station building was renovated in 1962. In addition to the ticket office and waiting rooms, the station building once housed the stationmaster's apartment. The building has since alternated between being vacant and occupied. It has also served as the premises of the Jyväskylä Rail Club and an antique shop. Since 2008, the station has been home to a ceramics workshop and in the autumn of 2011, six craftspeople opened a shop called Resiina. Today, the station building houses a bathroom furniture shop and renovation company.

Next to the station building is the former VR's dormitory building, which in recent years has been home to a local artist's studio gallery. The buildings were transferred from VR to the rural municipality of Jyväskylä and later on to the city. In 2013, the city of Jyväskylä sold the station and warehouse buildings as well as the plot to Metropolis Oy, which began renovating the buildings, which had fallen into disrepair.

On the other side of the track is the former railway workers' residence, also designed by Hellström. On the other side of the track was a SOK warehouse, which was destroyed in a fire in September 2013. It had previously served as a loading area for trains. The siding leading to the warehouse was built in 1918 around the same time as the railway, as was the one leading to the nearby confectionery and margarine factories. Later, the warehouse siding was extended further to the Vaajakoski nail factory.

== Gallery ==
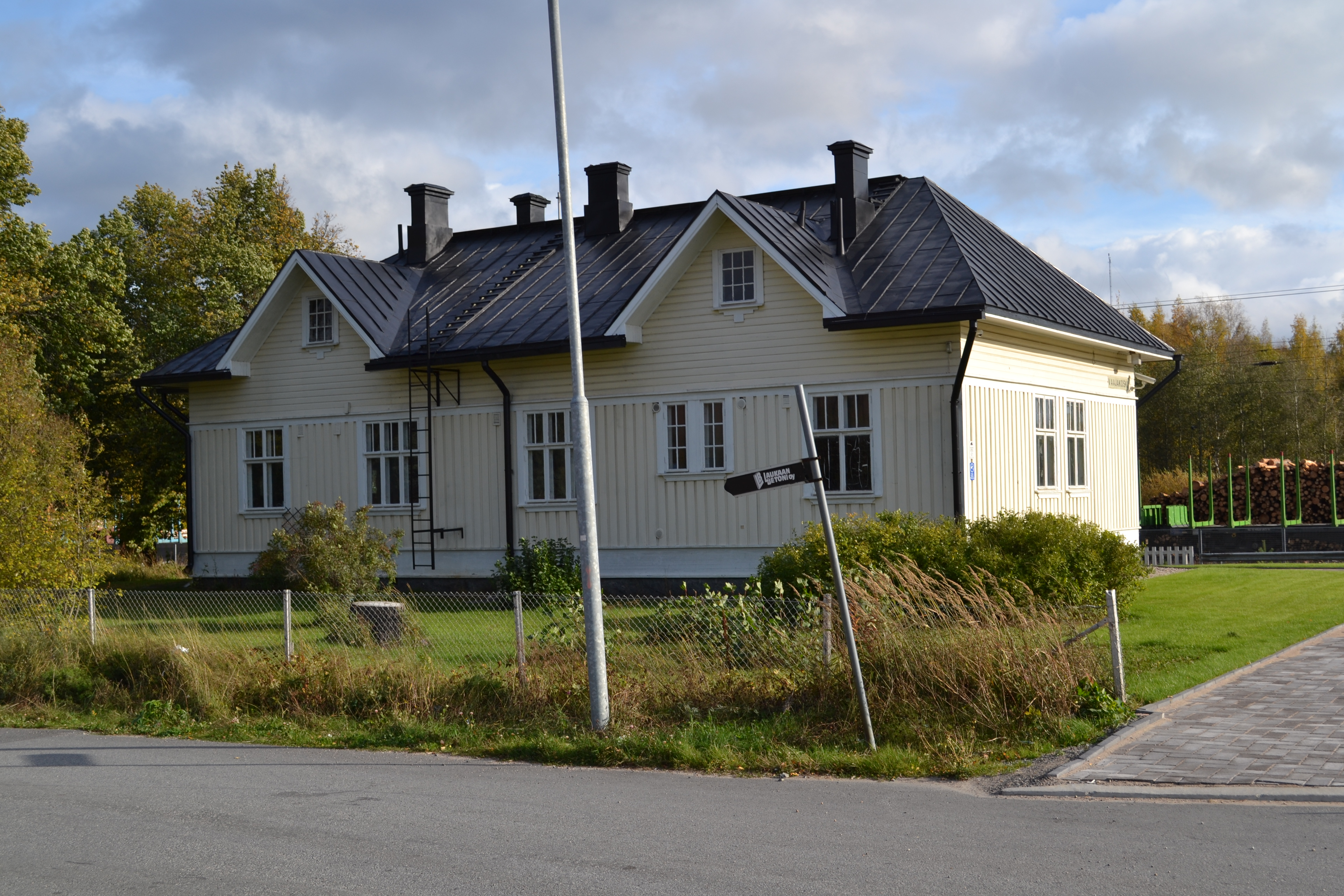
Station building pictured from Asemantie

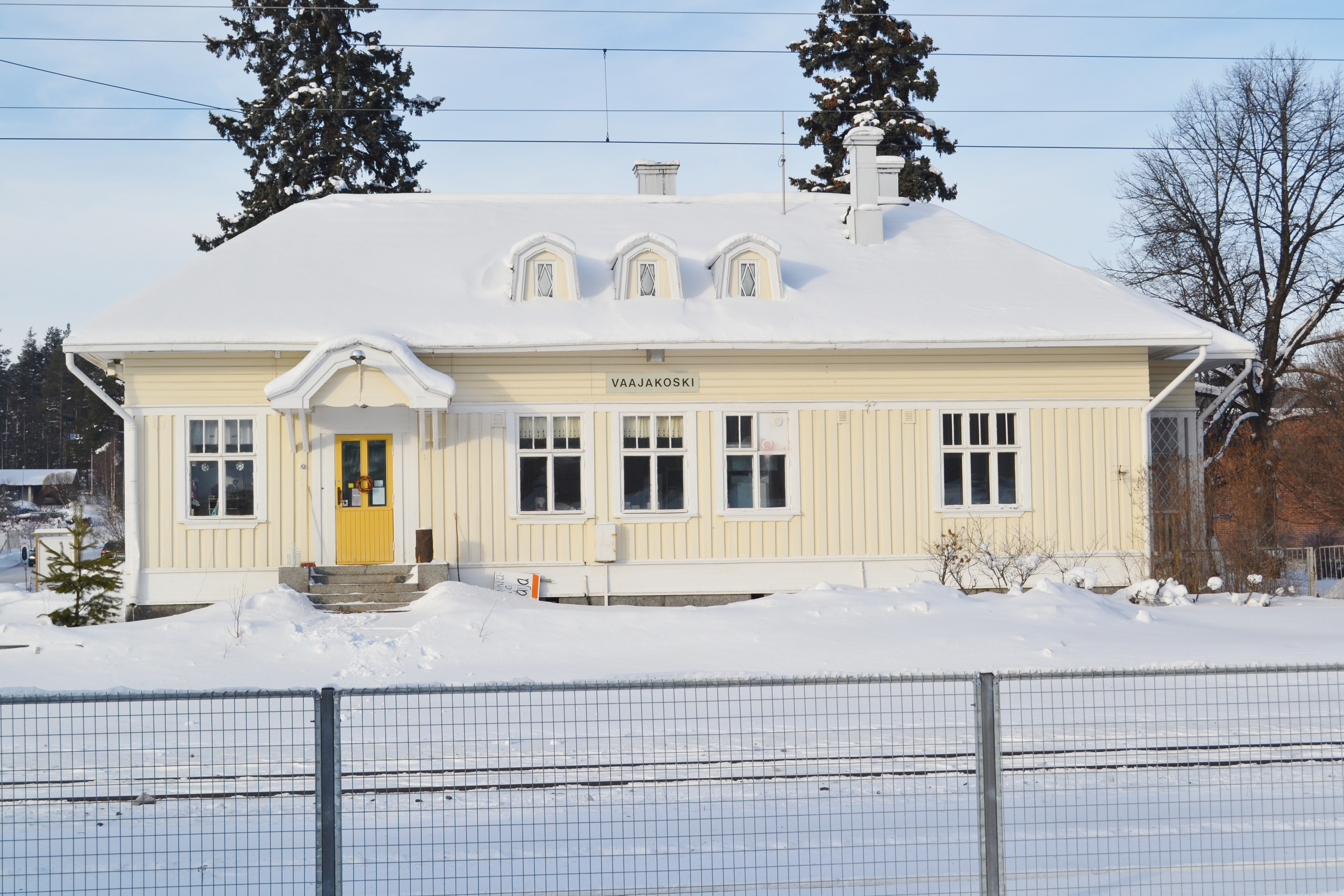
Station building in the winter of 2012

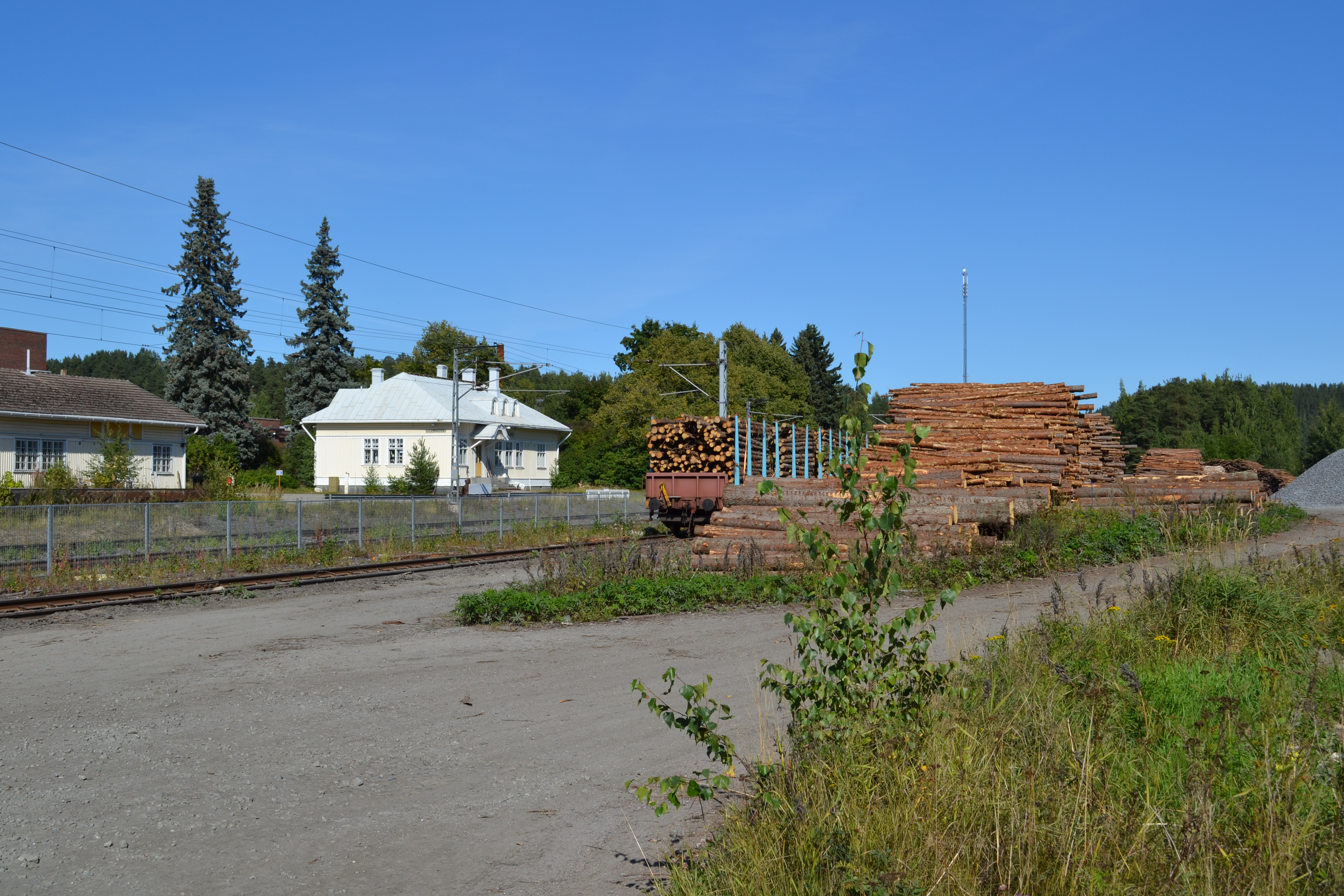
Rail yard in 2013

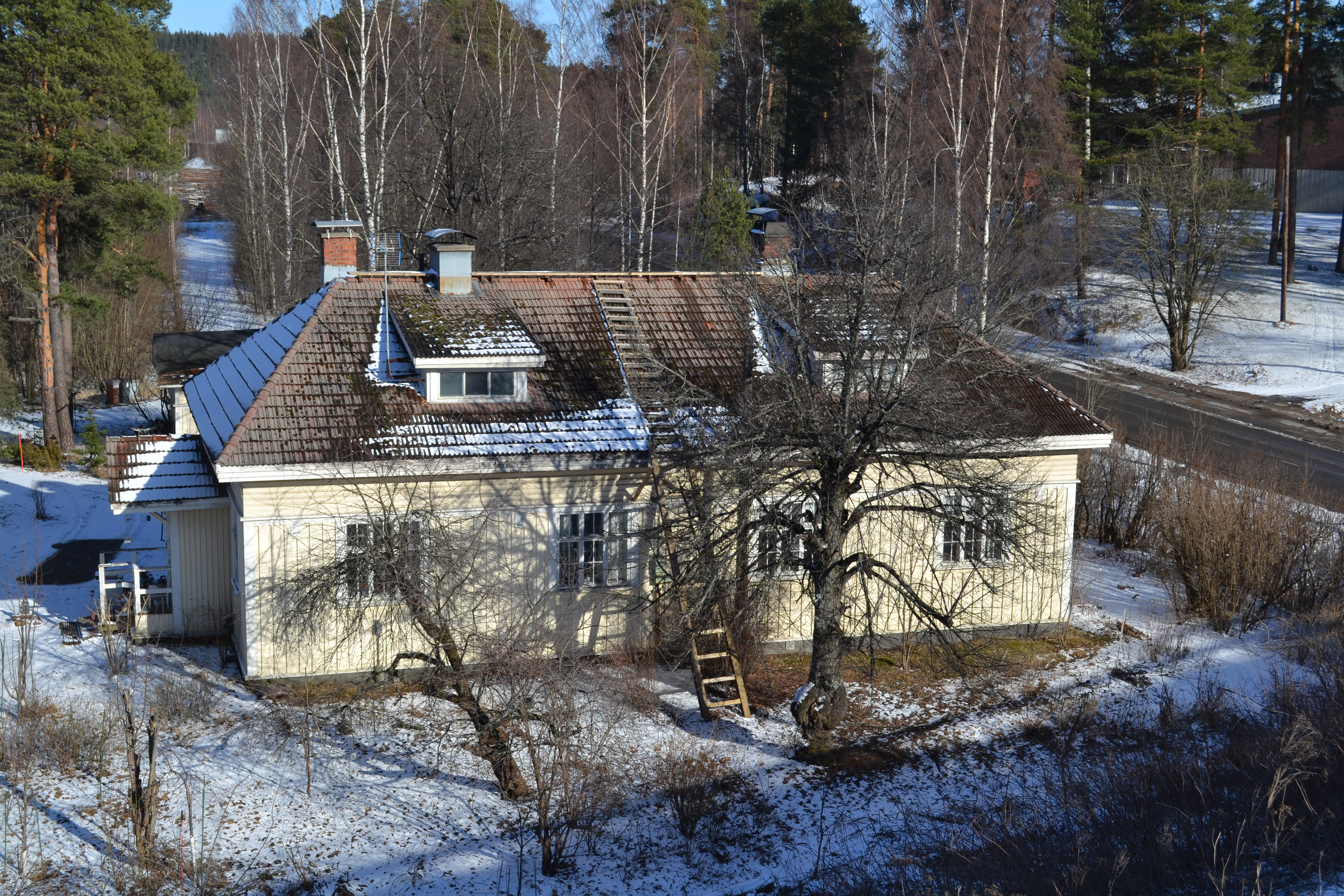
The former railway workers' residence
