= VKO =

VKO may refer to:

- Russian Aerospace Defence Forces, the former branch of the Russian Armed Forces
- Vaajakoski railway station, the station code Vko
- Vnukovo International Airport, the IATA code VKO
- Vnukovo Airlines, the ICAO code VKO
- vko, the ISO 639-3 code for Kodeoha language
