= Kanavuori =

- District of Jyväskylä
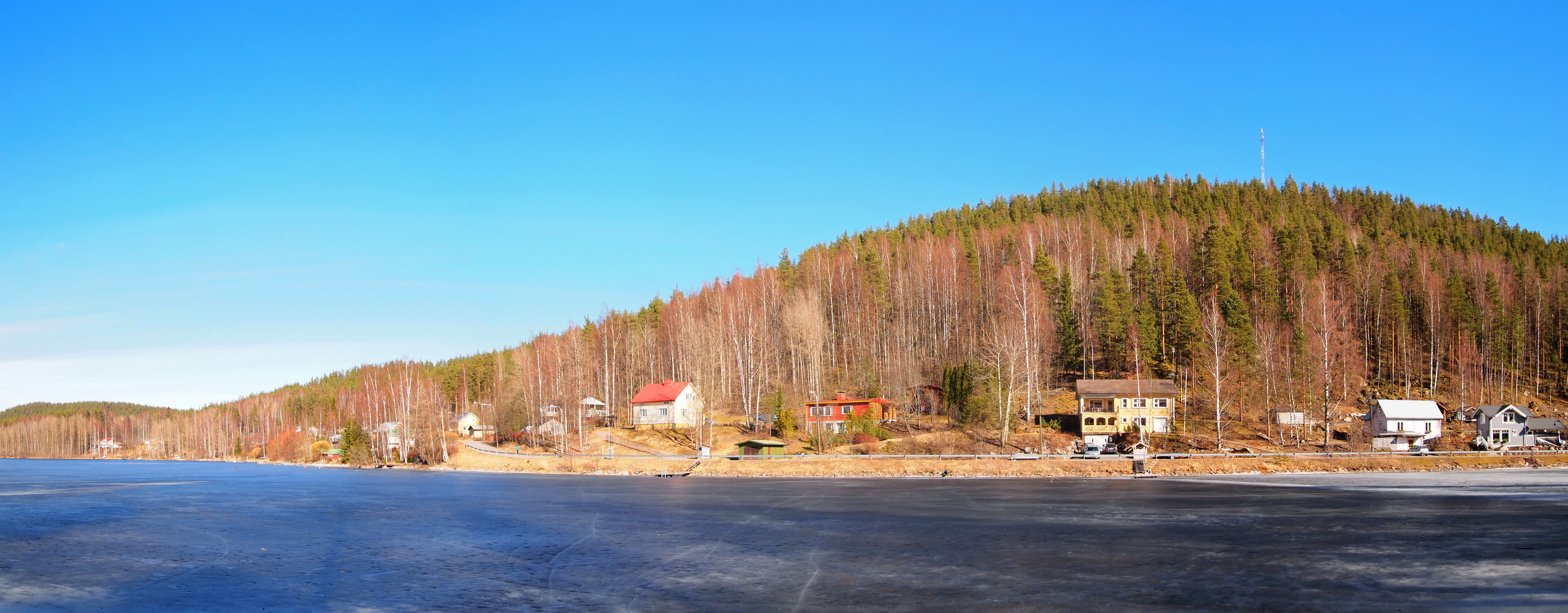
- Kanavuori
- Interactive map of Kanavuori
- Coordinates: 62°13′56″N 025°53′47″E
- Country: Finland
- Region: Central Finland
- Sub-region: Jyväskylä sub-region
- City: Jyväskylä
- Ward: Vaajakoski-Jyskä

Population (31 December 2007)
  - Total: 738
- Time zone: UTC+2 (EET)
  - Summer (DST): UTC+3 (EEST)
- Postal code: 40800 Vaajakoski

Kanavuori is a district, a hill and a nature reserve in Jyväskylä, Finland. It is a part of Vaajakoski-Jyskä ward. It is located at around 10 kilometres (6 mi) from the city centre on the shores of Vaajanvirta river between lake Päijänne and lake Leppävesi.

The residential area of Kanavuori consists mainly of detached housing in the area of Etu-Kanavuori, which is located at the foot of the hill on the shore of Vaajanvirta and along the Jyväskylä-Pieksämäki railway line. Also the residential areas of Ruokosaari and Naissaari belong to the official district. Kanavuori previously had a railway stop, but it was closed in 1983. There were 738 inhabitants on 31 December, 2007.

== Kanavuori Cave System ==
Kanavuori area hosts a network of caves and tunnels that covers approximately 13,000 square metres (140,000 sq ft). Originally constructed in 1940 as a military depot, it has been redeveloped after it was handed over from the military to private owners in 2006 to serve as secure storage, archival, and office space. These caves now house data centers, including a bomb-resistant server hall, and provide tenants with unique high-security facilities for sensitive data and valuable assets.

== Gallery ==
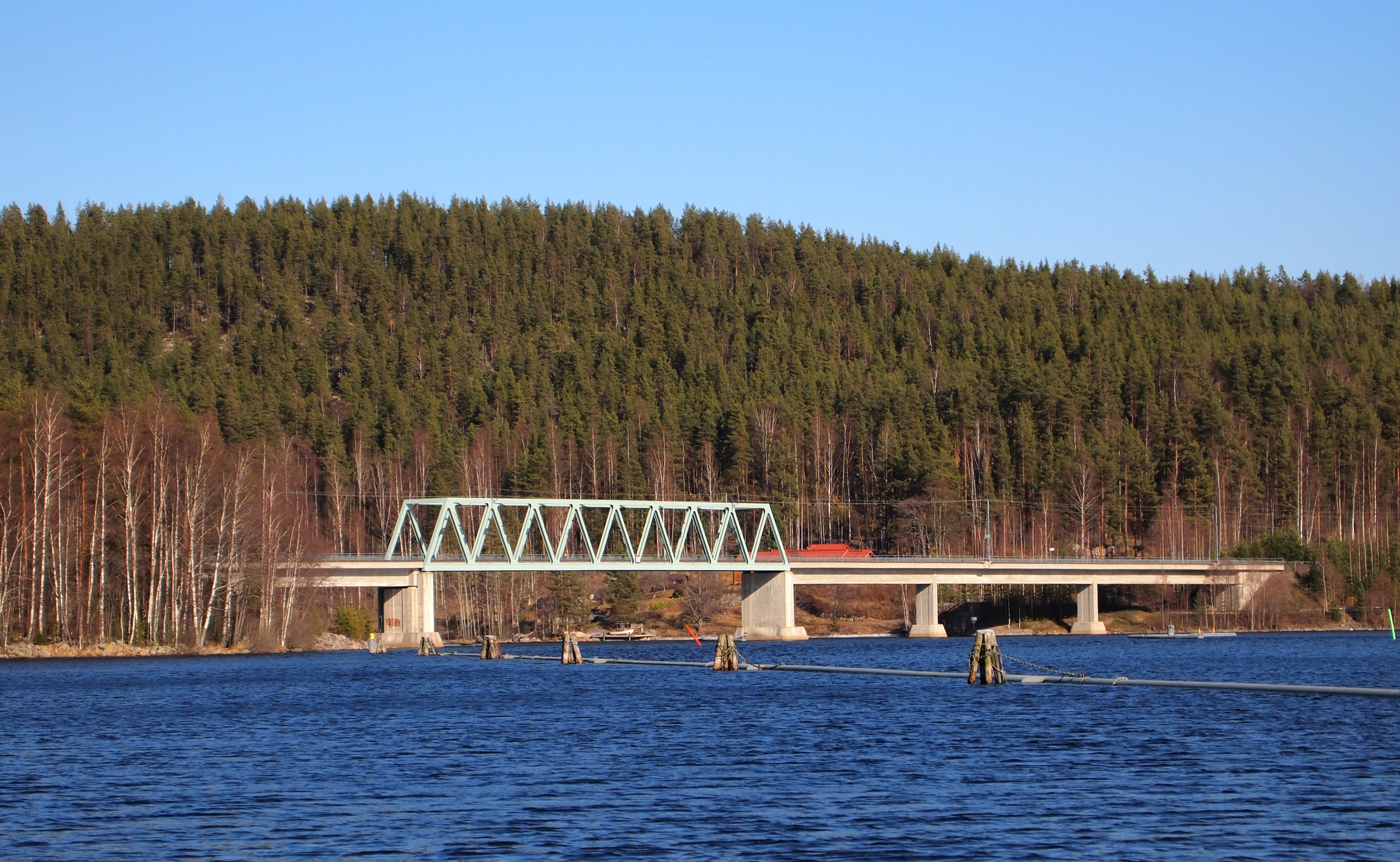
Haapakoski railway bridge

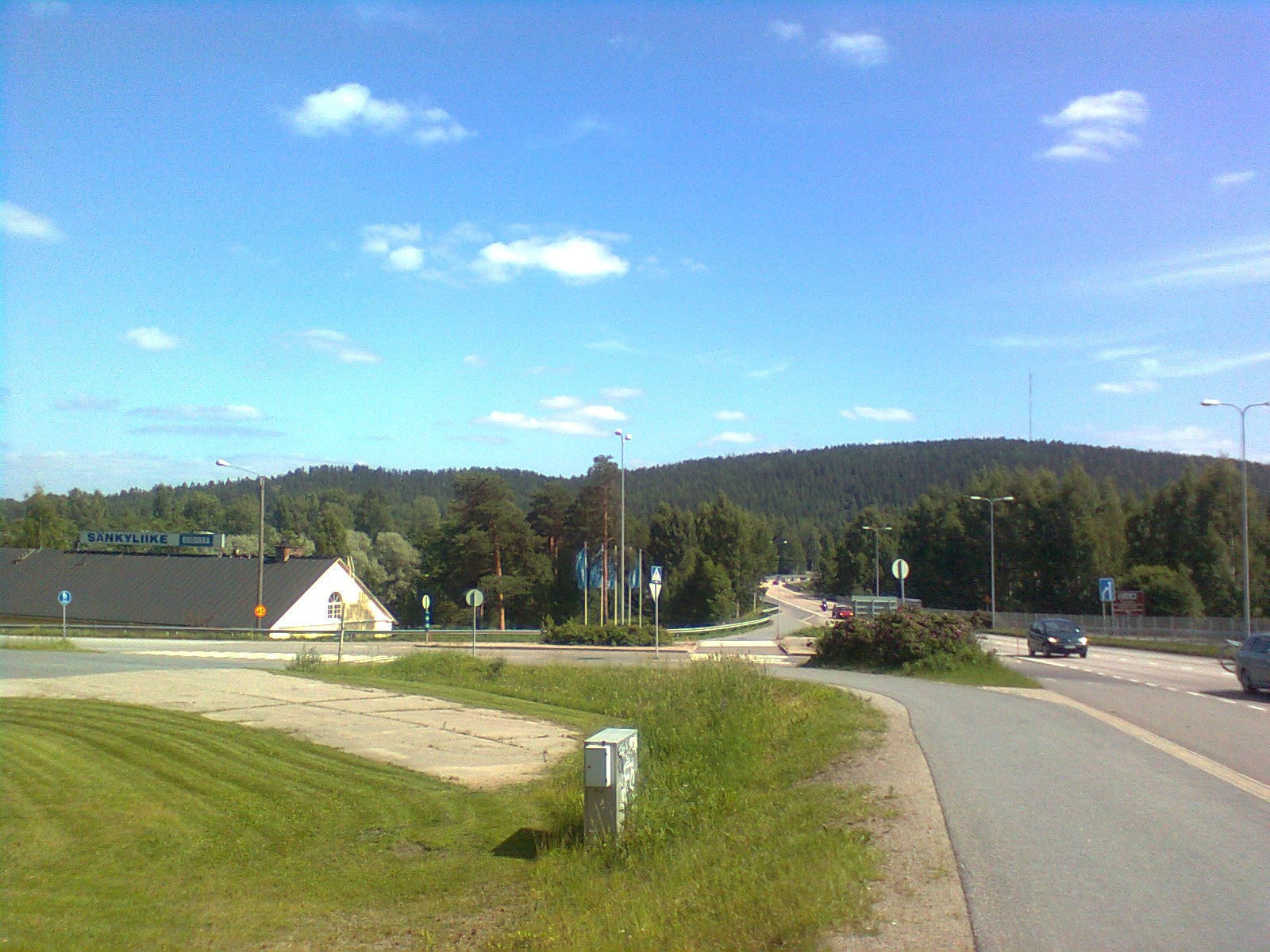
Kanavuori seen from Vaajakoski

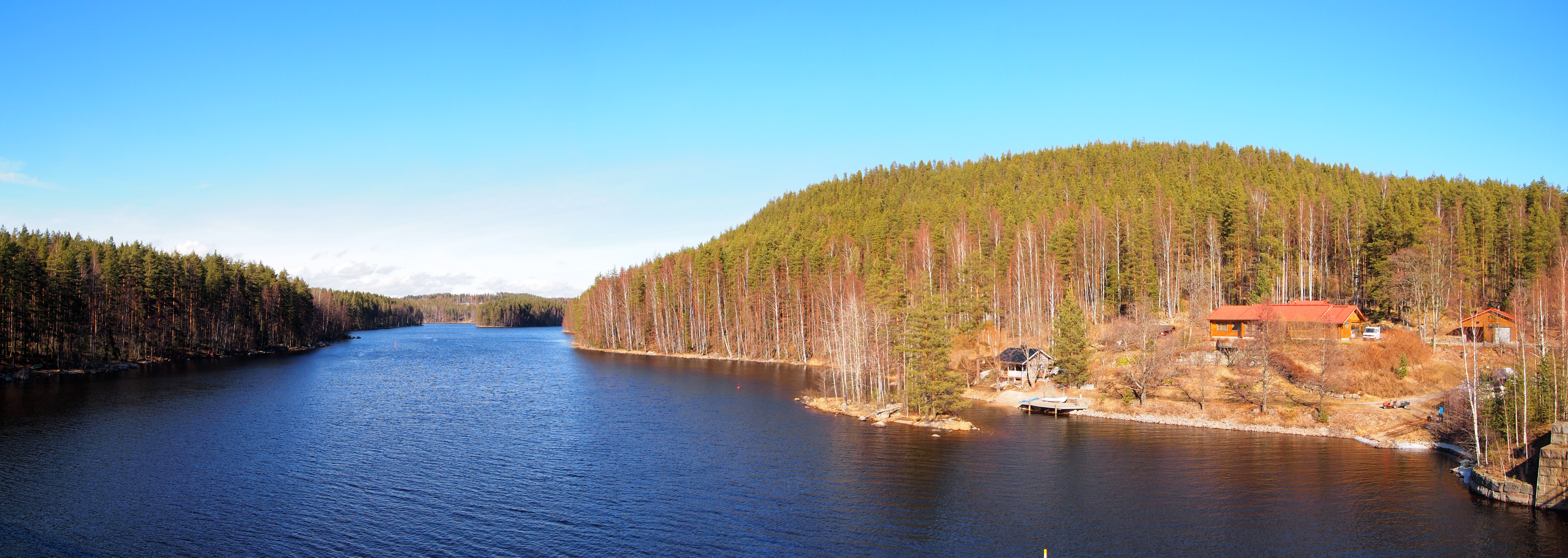
Vaajavirta and Koskenvuori hill
