= Pönttövuori tunnel =

Railway tunnel in Laukaa, Finland

Coordinates: 62°14′17″N 26°04′17″E

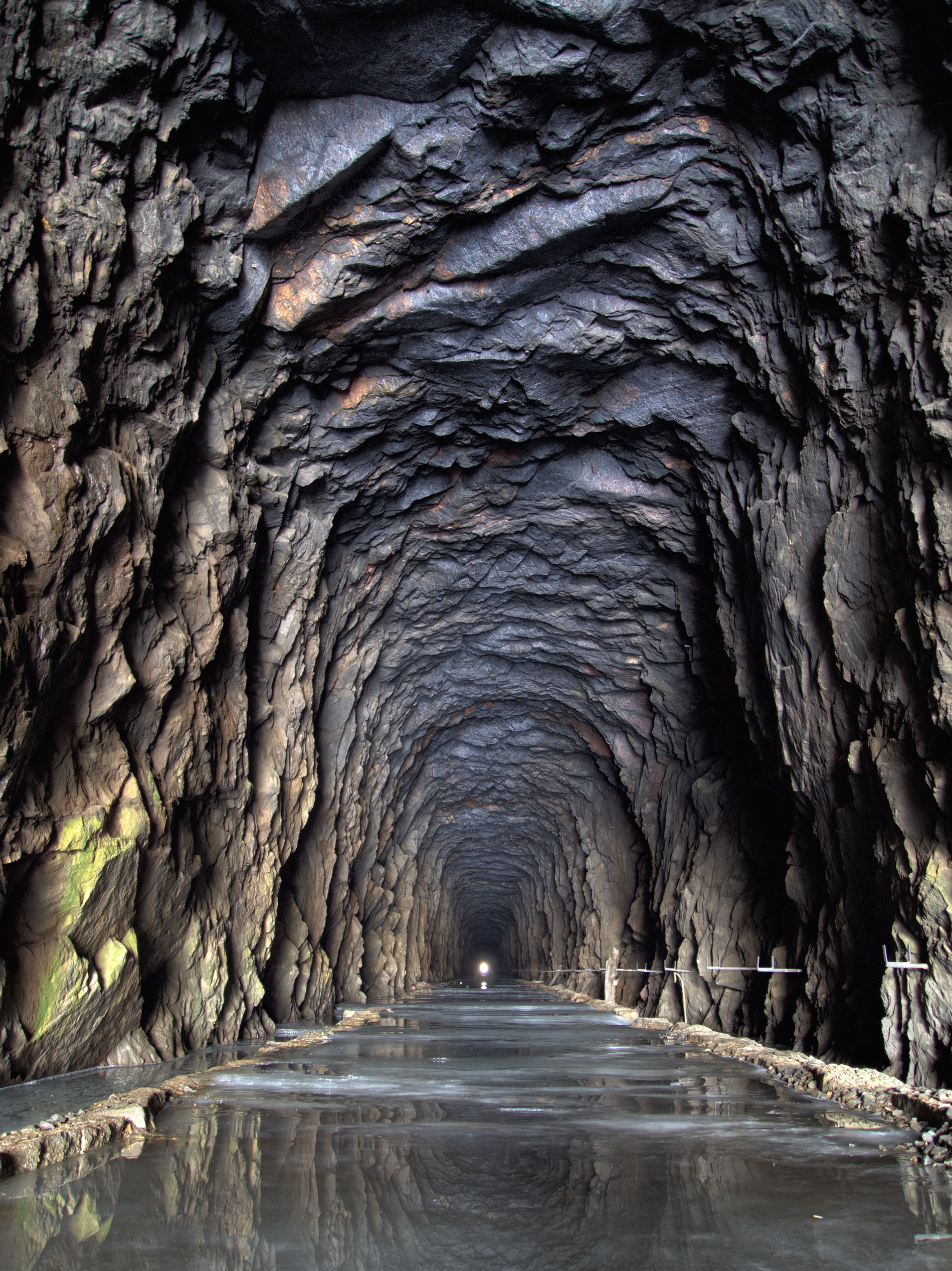
The old Pönttövuori tunnel in 2012. after decommissioning

The Pönttövuori tunnel is a rail tunnel under the Pönttövuori hill, on the Jyväskylä–Pieksämäki railway line, in Laukaa, central Finland, some 17 kilometres (11 mi) east of Jyväskylä.

The original, now disused, tunnel was completed in 1918, and is 1,223 metres (4,012 ft) in length. It cost slightly over 2m Finnish markka to build (c. EUR 3m in 2023 money). For several decades after its completion, it was the longest rail tunnel in Finland.

It was decommissioned in 1995, when a new tunnel opened alongside it, to allow taller, electrified trains to pass through; this tunnel is 1,429 metres (4,688 ft) in length.

Of these, only the newer tunnel is currently in use. The old one was sold by auction in 2024.
