= Vaajanvirta =

Vaajanvirta Vaajavirta
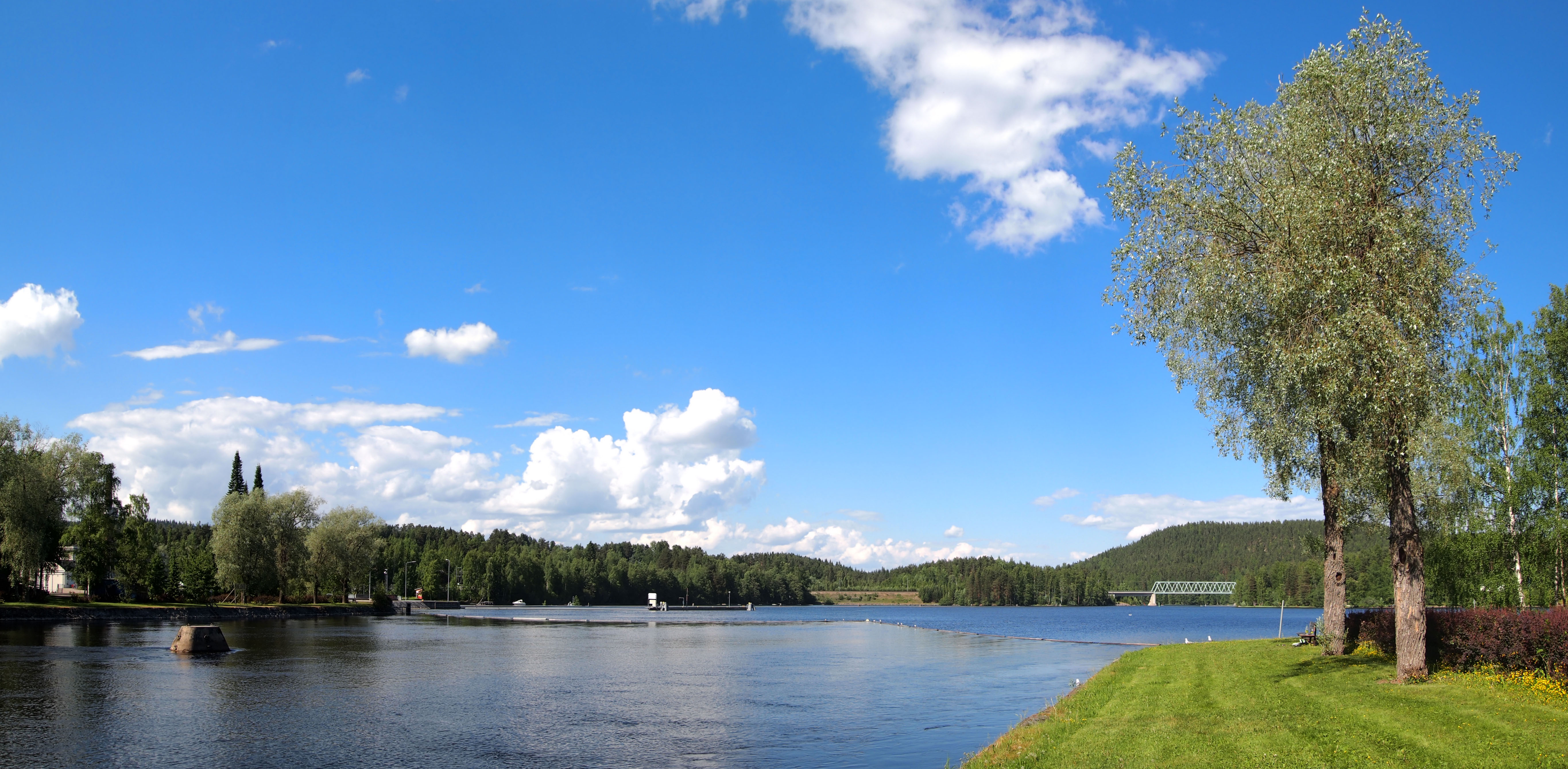
- Vaajanvirta in June 2013

Location
- Country: Finland
- Region: Central Finland
- Municipality: Jyväskylä
- District: Vaajakoski

Physical characteristics
- Source: Leppävesi
  - coordinates: 62.262°N 25.912°E
  - elevation: 81.2 m (266 ft)
- Mouth: Lake Päijänne
  - coordinates: 62.235°N 25.877°E
  - elevation: 78.8 m (259 ft)
- Length: 3.9 km (2.4 mi)
- Basin size: 17,668 km^{2} (6,822 sq mi)
- Depth
  - maximum: 25 m (82 ft)
- Discharge
  - average: 150 m^{3}/s (5,300 cu ft/s)
  - maximum: 471 m^{3}/s (16,600 cu ft/s)

Basin features
- River system: Kymijoki

The Vaajanvirta, also spelled as Vaajavirta, is a 3.9-kilometre (2.4 mi) long river in the Vaajakoski area of Jyväskylä, Finland. It begins from the lake Leppävesi and discharges into Lake Päijänne. The river's basin has a surface area of 17,668 square kilometres (6,822 sq mi), which includes many major Central Finnish lakes, such as Lake Keitele.

The river is part of the Keitele Canal's route, which connects the lakes Päijänne and Keitele. The Finnish national road 4 and the Jyväskylä–Pieksämäki railway also cross the river.

== Geography ==
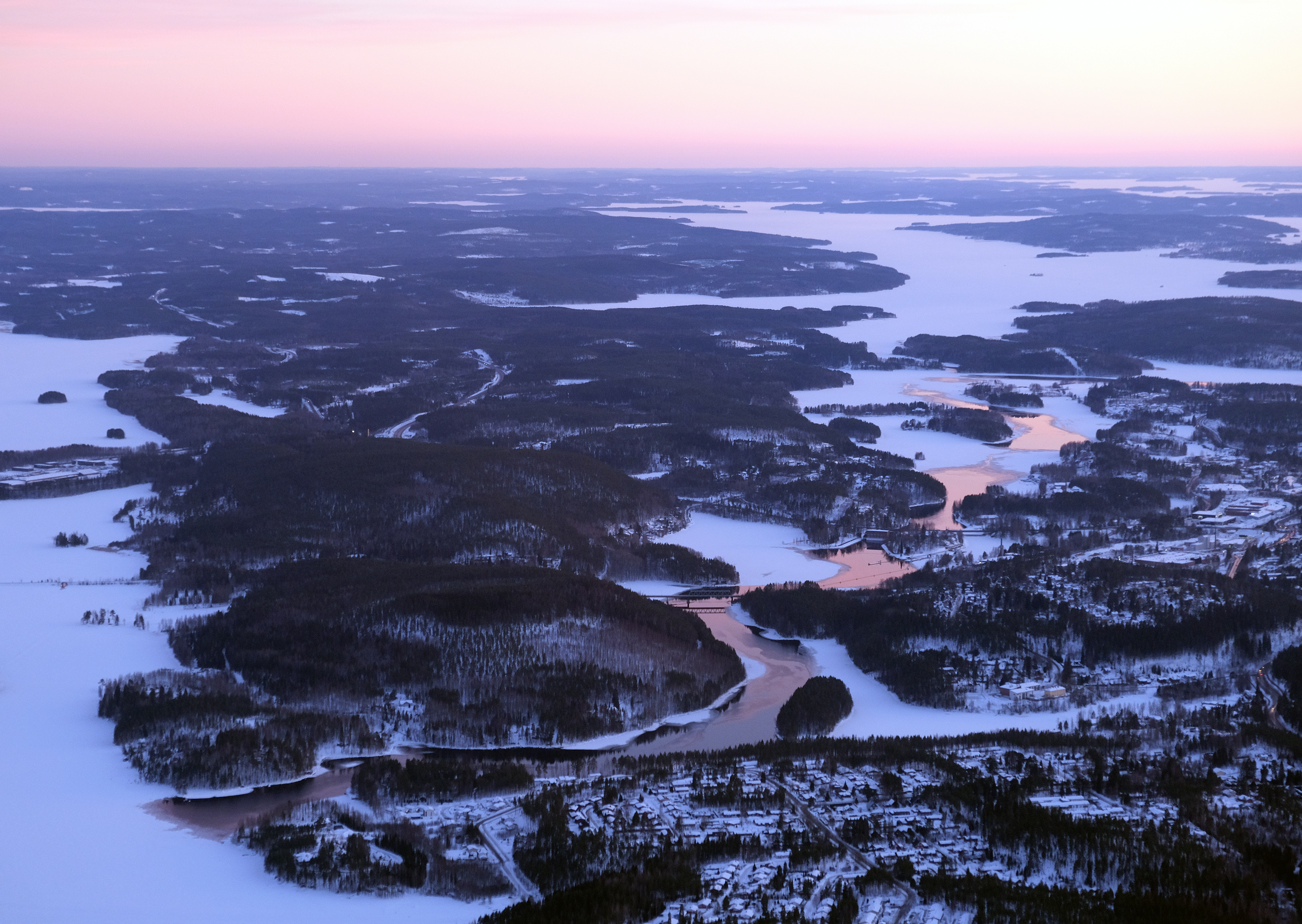
Aerial view over Vaajakoski, showing the entire river.

Vaajanvirta begins from the western part of lake Leppävesi with a surface at 81.2 metres (266 ft) above sea level. Aside from Leppävesi, Vaajanvirta also gets water from Hupelinlampi, a small lake near Kanavuori, whose outlet discharges into the Saltunlahti bay of the river. The river has three islands: Lapinsaari, Naissaari and Varassaari. Lapinsaari is uninhabited, while Naissaari and Varassaari are connected to the mainland via bridges. Vaajanvirta discharges into the Päijänne, whose surface is located 78.8 metres (259 ft) above sea level. It is the main inflow of the lake's northern part and has an average discharge of 150 m^{3}/s (5,300 cu ft/s). The maximum discharge is 471 m^{3}/s (16,600 cu ft/s), recorded in 1988.

The river originally had four rapids: Ylinenkoski, Keskikoski, Haapakoski and Naiskoski. Haapakoski and Naiskoski are parallel rapids, respectively located on the western and eastern side of Naissaari, both of which are dammed. Ylinenkoski and Keskikoski have been dredged. The rapids in the river were first dredged in the early 19th century.

Vaajanvirta has a large basin covering an area of 17,668 square kilometres (6,822 sq mi), of which 16.8% is water. It includes most of northern Central Finland as well as smaller parts of neighboring regions, most notably North Savo. Major lakes within the basin include Keitele, Kivijärvi, Konnevesi and Niinivesi.

== Traffic ==
The Vaajakoski lock on the northern side of Naissaari is the lowest lock of the 45-kilometre (28 mi) long Keitele Canal, which was built between 1990 and 1993. Before that, a smaller boat canal called Kissakanava passed through the island. The lock is 250 metres (820 ft) long and is open to traffic between May and October.

Both the Finnish national road 4 and the Jyväskylä–Pieksämäki railway cross the Vaajanvirta.

== Fishing ==
The Vaajanvirta is an important fishing site that is visited by multiple hundreds of fishers yearly. It is especially valued as a place to catch brown trout, which migrate through the river. Before the river's rapids were dammed in the 1920s and 1940s, trout weighing at least 5 kg (11 lb) were caught fairly often. The size of the fish started declining further in the 1960s, when nylon fishing nets became more common. Despite this, trout longer than 60 cm (24 in) are somewhat more common in the Vaajanvirta than further up the Keitele–Päijänne watercourse. The average length of trout in the river is 45–50 cm (18–20 in).

== Hydroelectricity ==
There are two hydroelectric plants in the Vaajanvirta, of which only the newer one is in use. The Haapakoski plant was built in 1921 and was replaced by the Naiskoski plant in 1941. The new plant was owned by SOK until 1984, when it was acquired by its current owner, Suur-Savon Sähkö Oy. It has a capacity of 3.6 megawatts and contains three Kaplan turbines with a speed of 60 rotations per minute.

The older plant, marketed as Wanha Woimala, has been repurposed into a venue for cultural events.
