= Jyväskylä–Pieksämäki railway =

Railway line in Finland

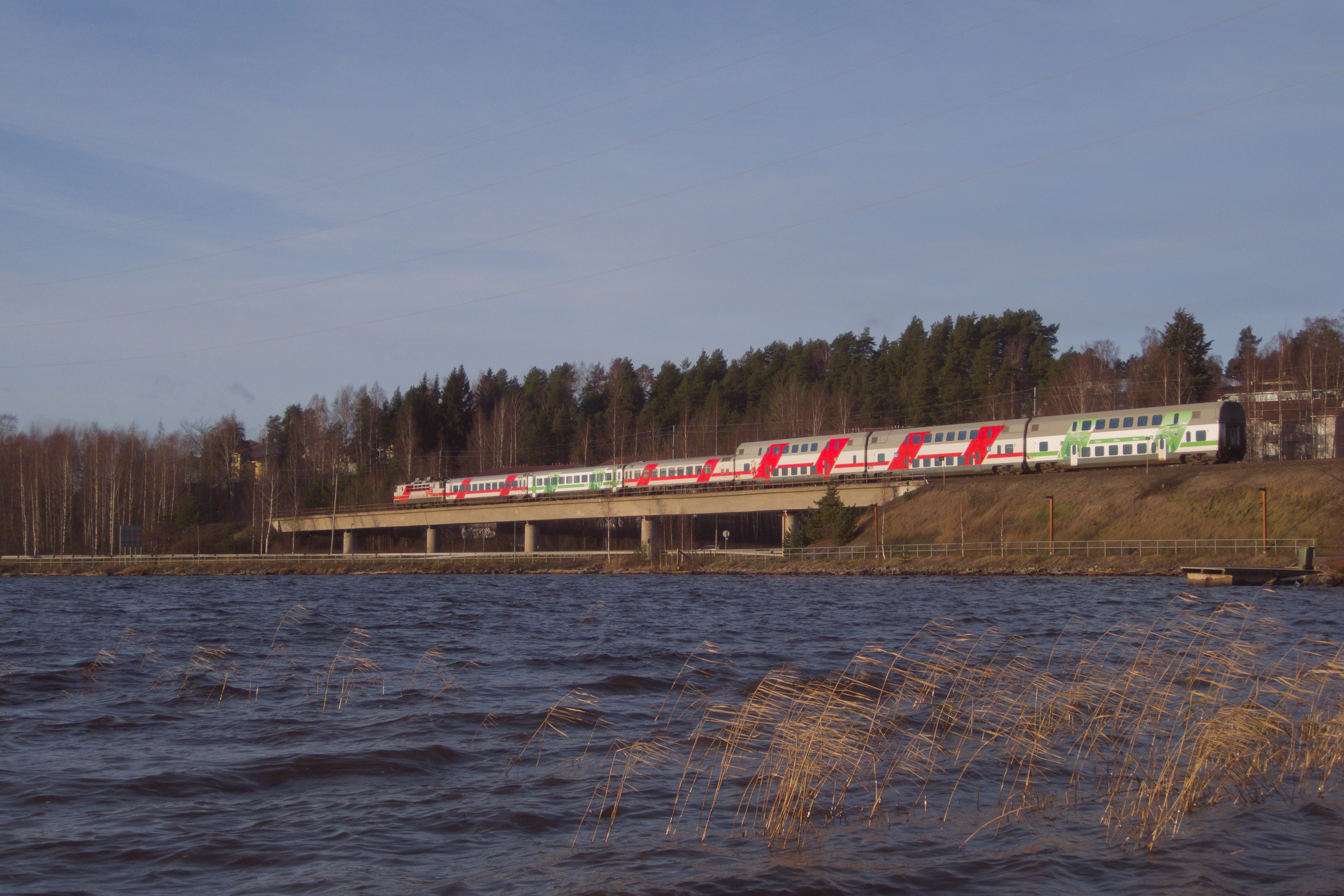
- An InterCity train crossing the Rauhalahti bridge

Overview
- Status: Open
- Owner: Finnish government
- Locale: Central Finland; South Savo
- Termini: Jyväskylä; Pieksämäki

Service
- Operator(s): VR Group

History
- Opened: 1918

Technical
- Line length: 80 km (50 mi)
- Number of tracks: 1
- Track gauge: 1,524 mm (5 ft)
- Electrification: 25 kV @ 50 Hz

The Jyväskylä–Pieksämäki railway (Finnish: Jyväskylä–Pieksämäki-rata, Swedish: Jyväskylä–Pieksämäki-banan) is a 1,524 mm (5 ft) railway in Finland, running between the Jyväskylä and Pieksämäki stations.

== History ==
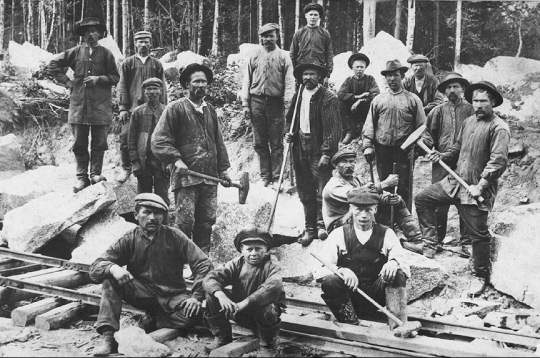
Railway builders in Palvajärvi in 1918

The decision to build the line was made in 1912, and the most difficult and expensive of the route options was chosen. The decision was influenced by the experience gained from the construction of the curved and hilly Haapamäki–Jyväskylä railway, which proved inadequate for the growing train traffic. The line became straightforward - plans to bypass Leppälahti and Pönttövuori were abandoned. In turn, the population centers of Hankasalmi and Kankainen were bypassed, which eventually led to the creation of the station villages of Hankasalmi, Sauvamäki and Venetmäki. The main challenges of the construction process were at the western end of the line - namely, the cliffs between Vaajakoski and Leppälahti, the long lake embankments and the tunnel through the Pönttövuori.

The Jyväskylä-Pieksämäki line was the last part of the railway line from St. Petersburg to Vaasa via inland Finland, which the Russian government considered particularly important for strategic reasons. The old Riihimäki–Saint Petersburg railway was so close to the coast of the Gulf of Finland that it was feared that it might be captured by the enemy in the event of war. When newly completed, the line was indeed of considerable strategic importance, not to the Russians but to the Whites of the Finnish Civil War: the Riihimäki–Saint Petersburg line was in Red territory, while this new line was entirely White-controlled, linking the old north-south lines. The railway was completed a few days before the start of the Civil War.

== Gallery ==
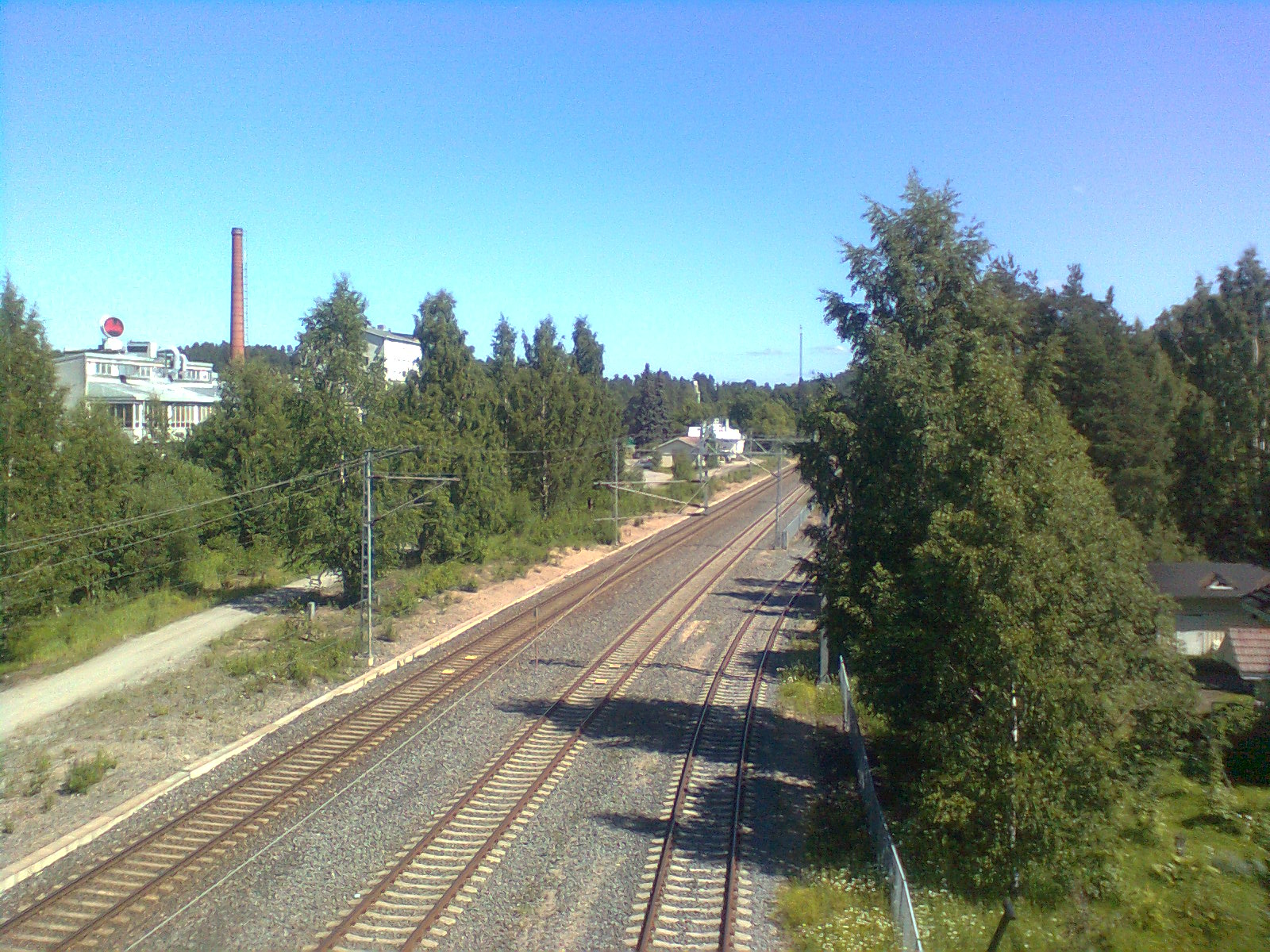
Vaajakoski rail yard

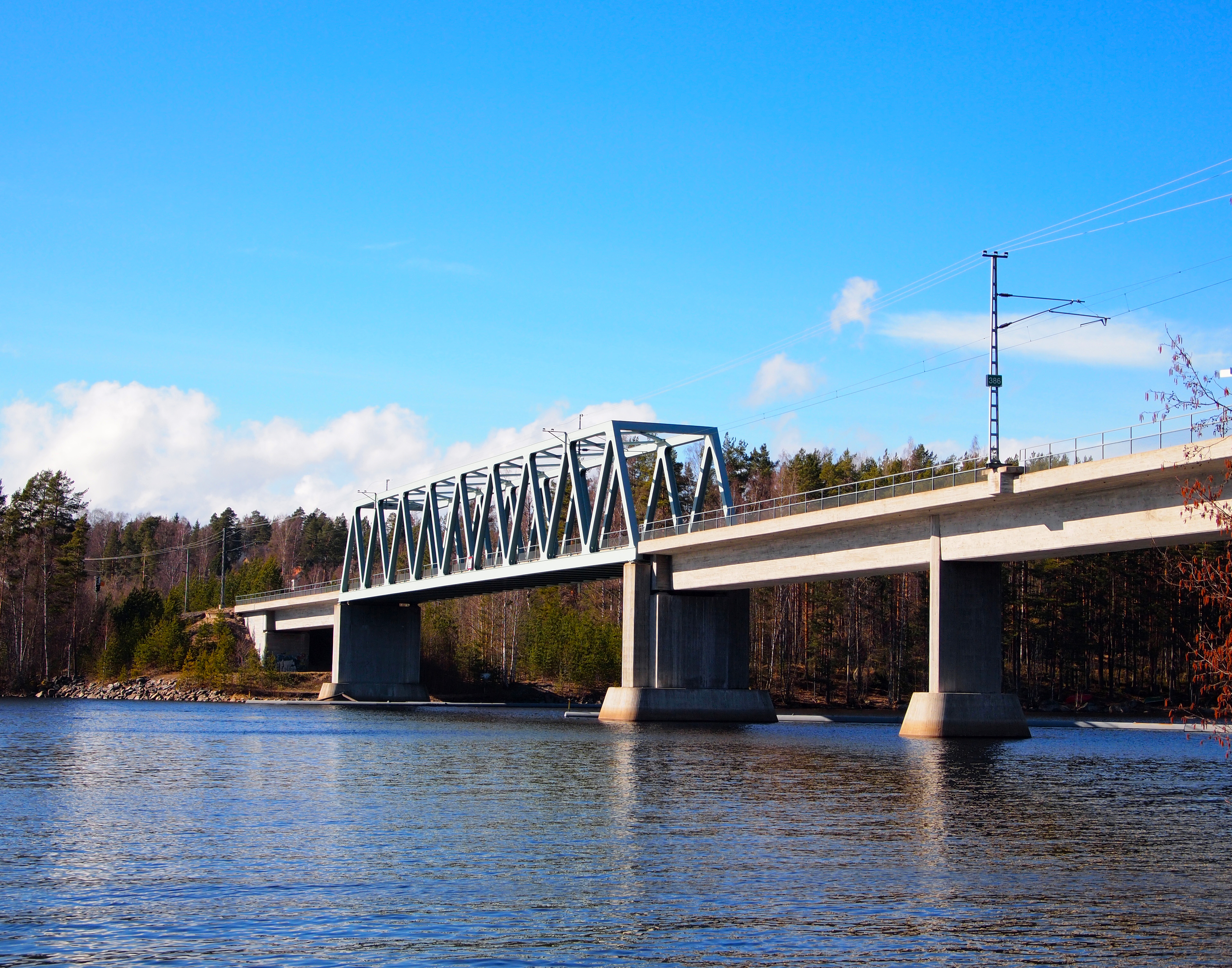
The current Haapakoski bridge, crossing river Vaajanvirta

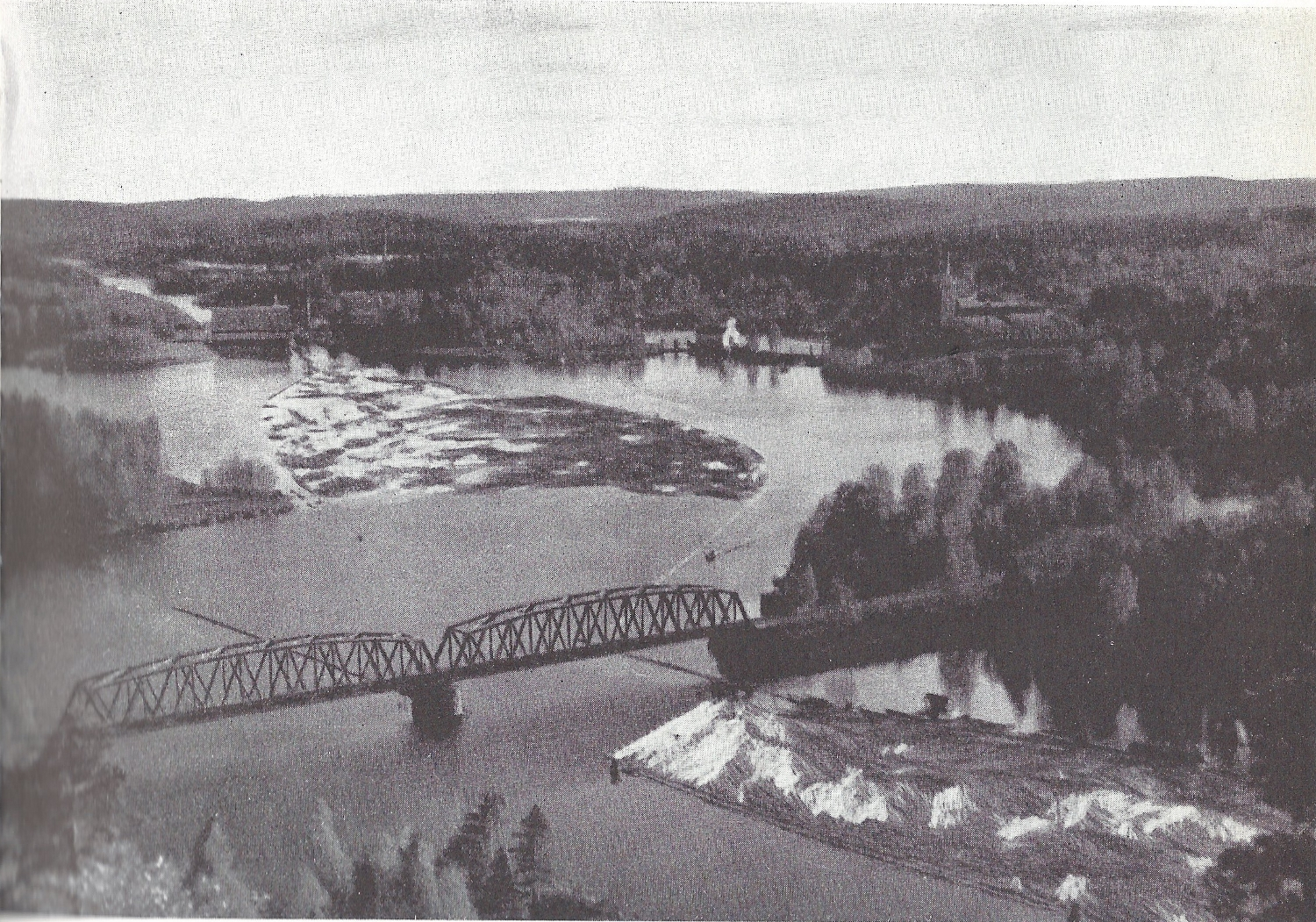
The old Haapakoski bridge
