= Vaajakoski =

Coordinates: 62°14′54″N 25°52′16″E

- District
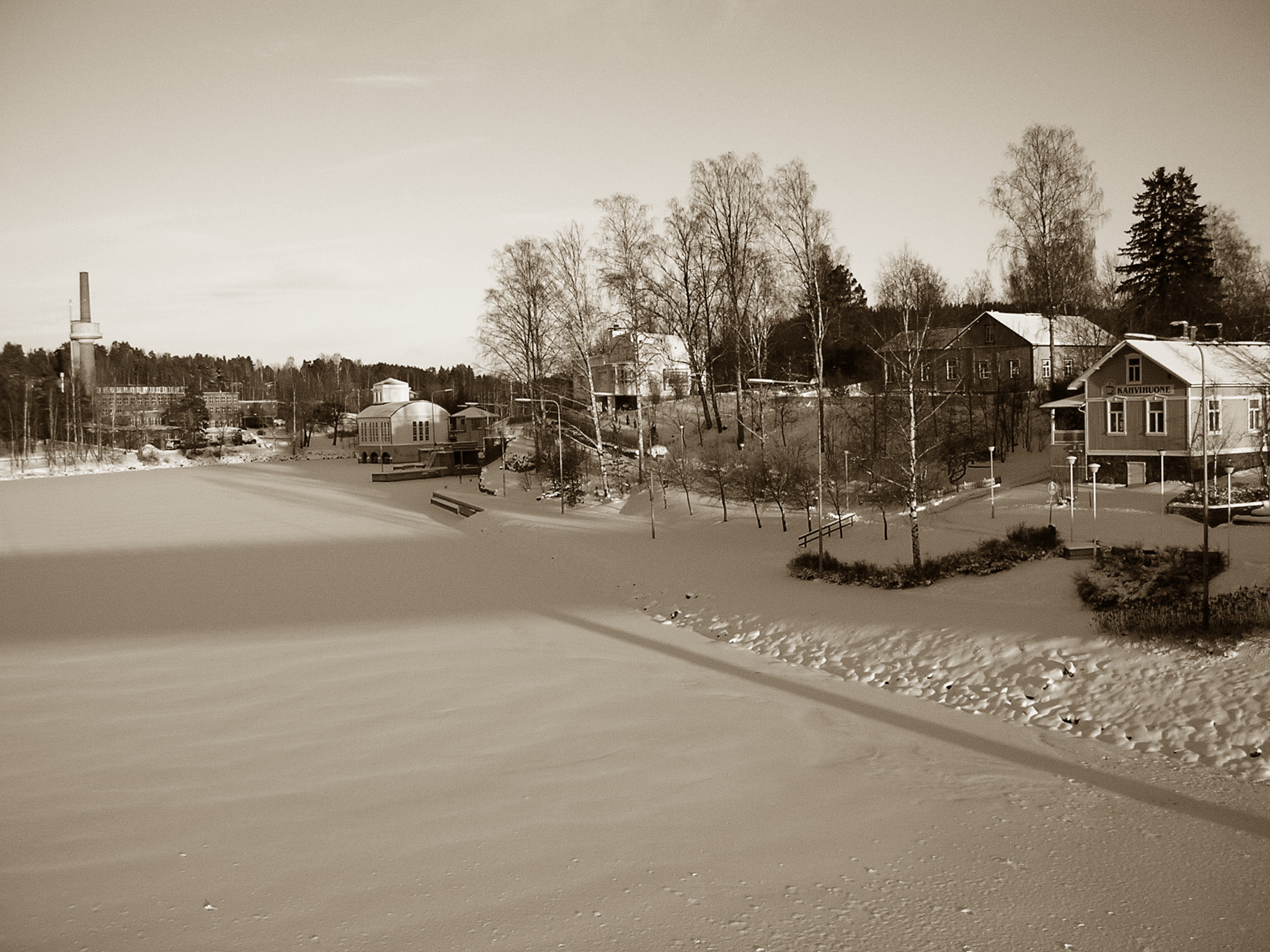
- A view from Naissaari in Vaajakoski
- Country: Finland
- Province: Western Finland
- Region: Central Finland
- Sub-region: Jyväskylä sub-region
- City: Jyväskylä
- Ward: Vaajakoski-Jyskä

Population (2012)
  - Total: 1,503
- Time zone: UTC+2 (EET)
  - Summer (DST): UTC+3 (EEST)
- Postal code: 40800 VAAJAKOSKI

Vaajakoski is a district of Jyväskylä, Finland and the centre of Vaajakoski-Jyskä ward. It is located seven kilometres from the city centre on the Northern end of lake Päijänne, where it is bordered by Jyskä to the west, Sulunperä and Kaunisharju to the north, Tölskä to the west and Haapaniemi to the south. As of January 2012 the population of Vaajakoski district was 1503.

In spoken language the name Vaajakoski is used to describe big parts of Vaajakoski-Jyskä ward.

== Gallery ==
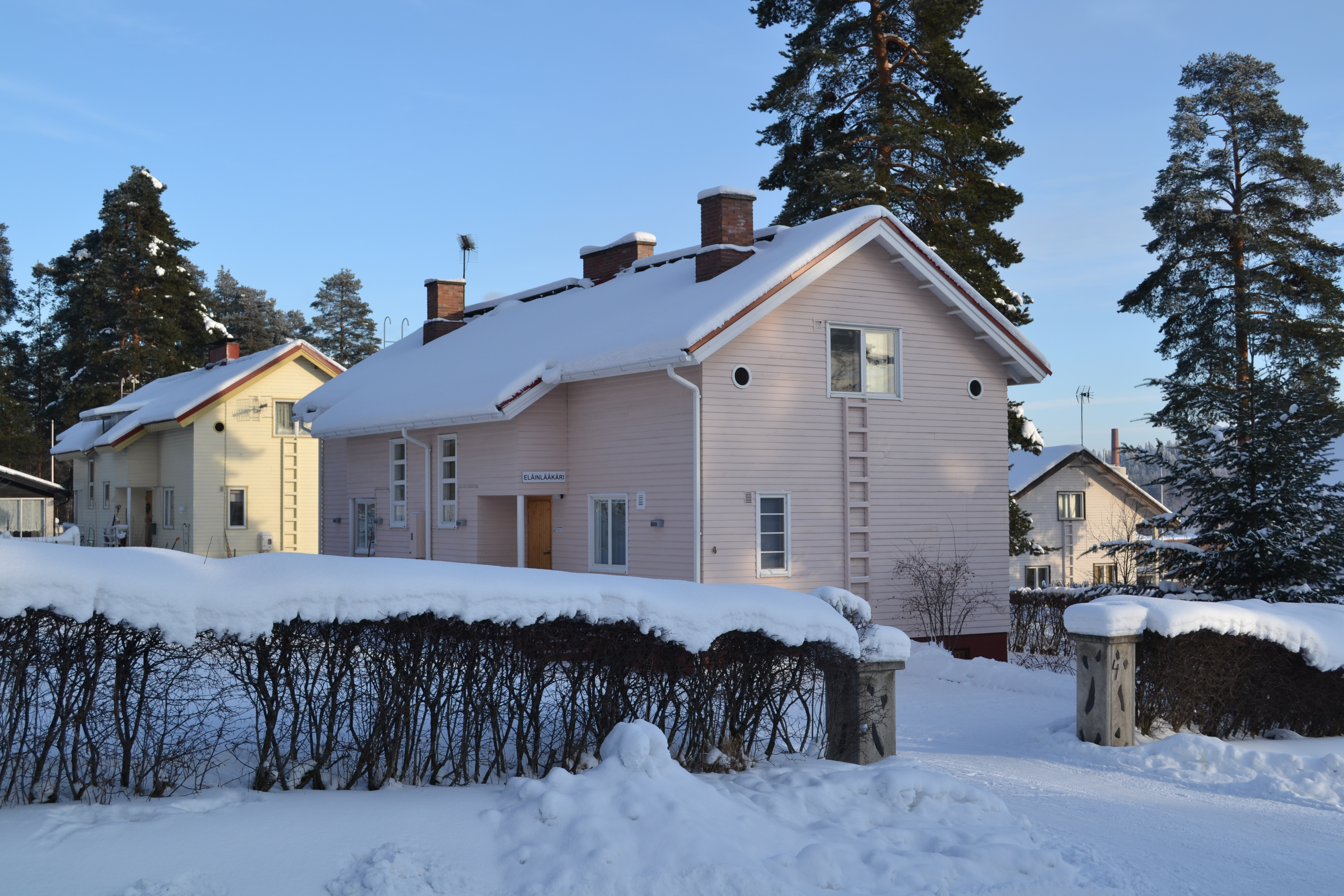
Semi-detached houses of Kakaravaara in Northern Vaajakoski

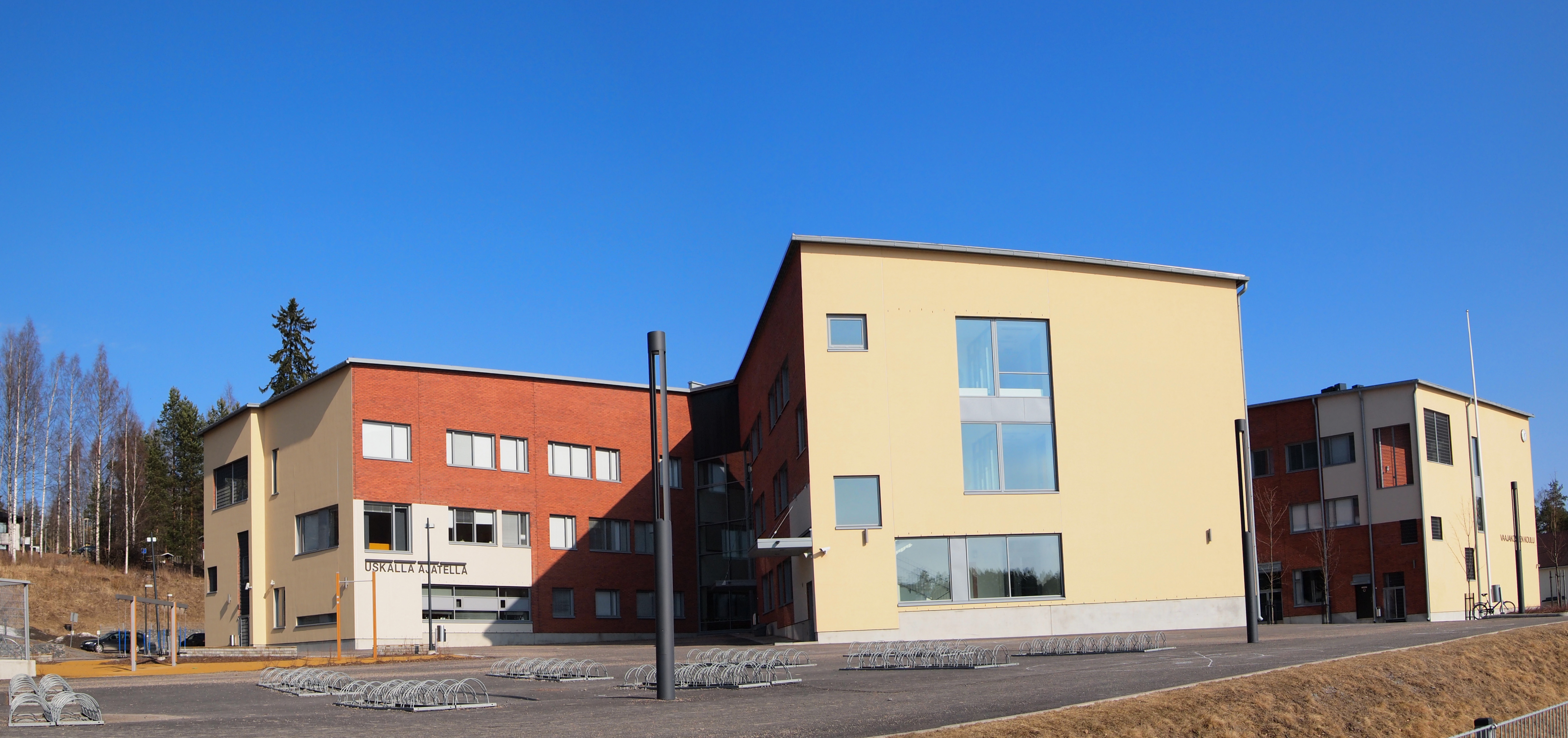
Vaajakoski Junior Highschool

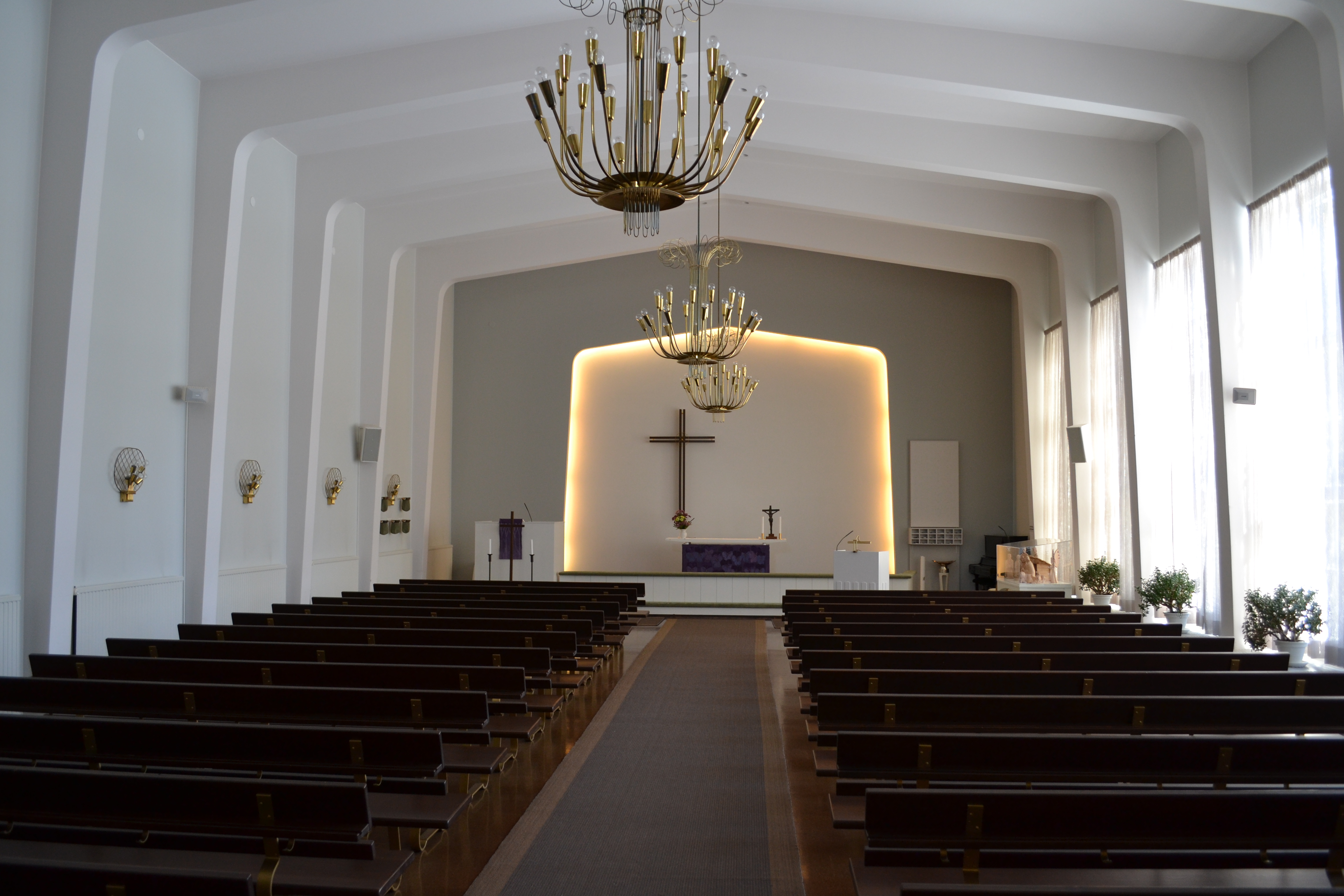
Interior of Vaajakoski Lutheran Church

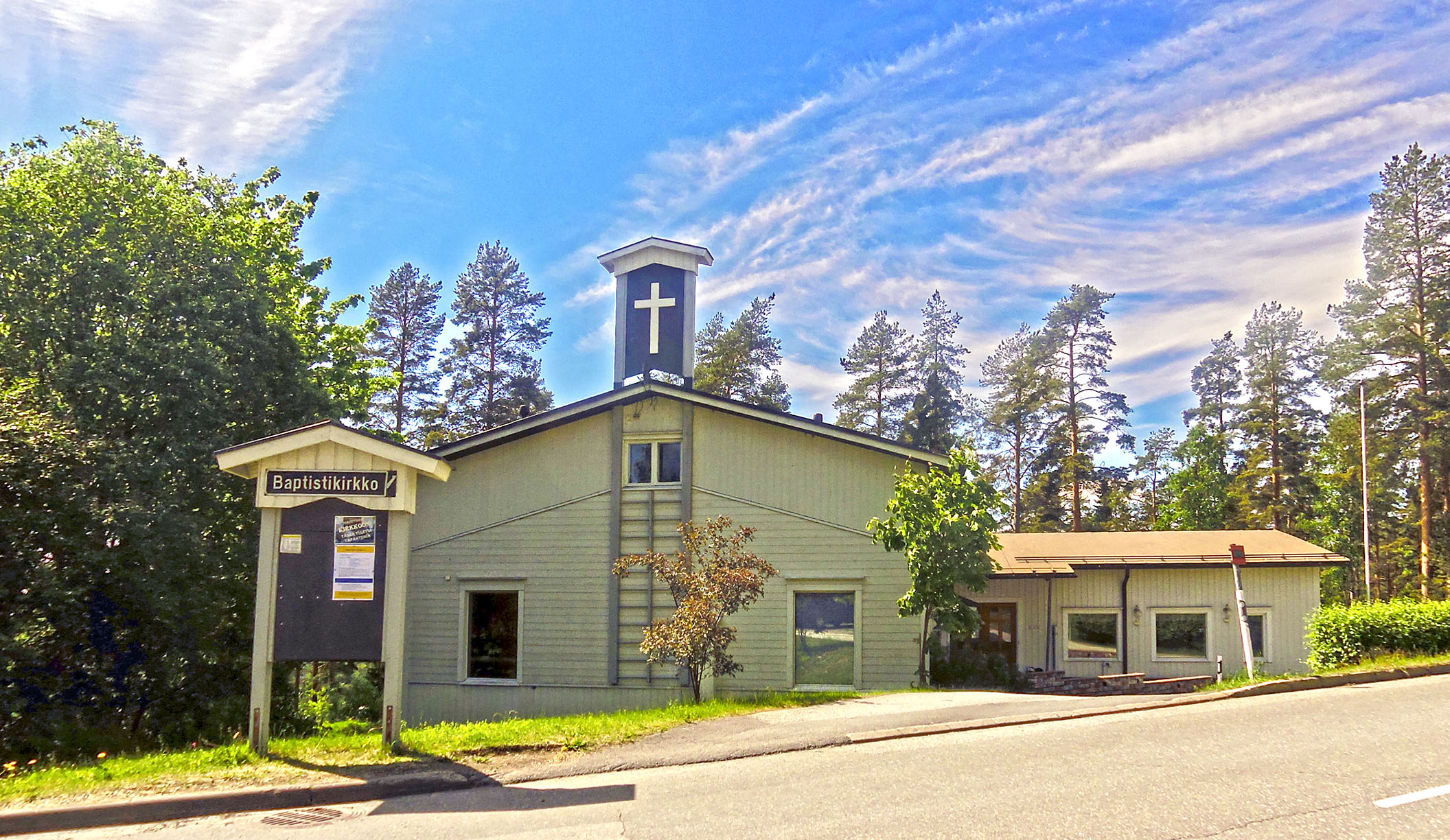
Vaajakoski Baptist Church

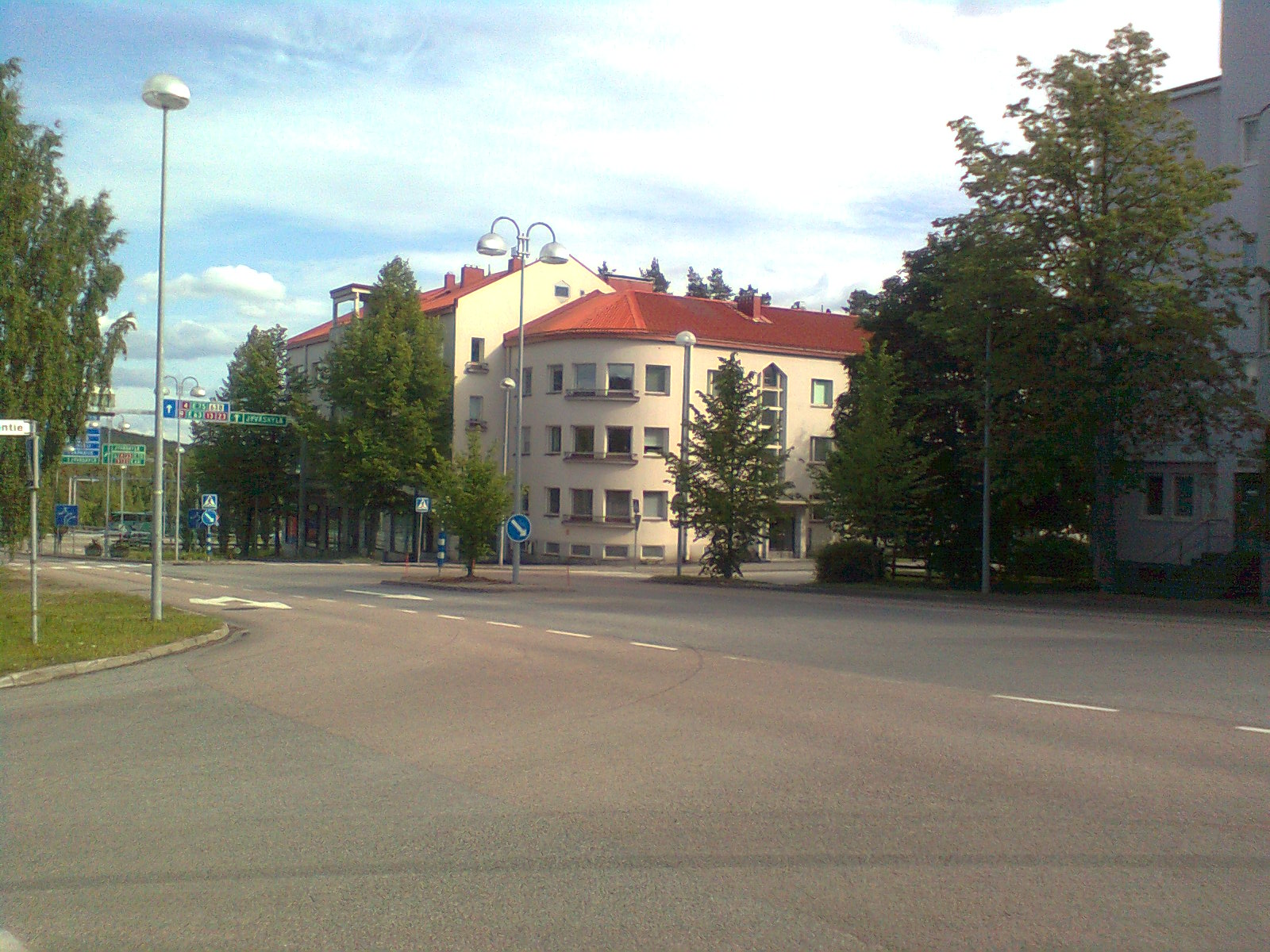
Wesmanninmäki

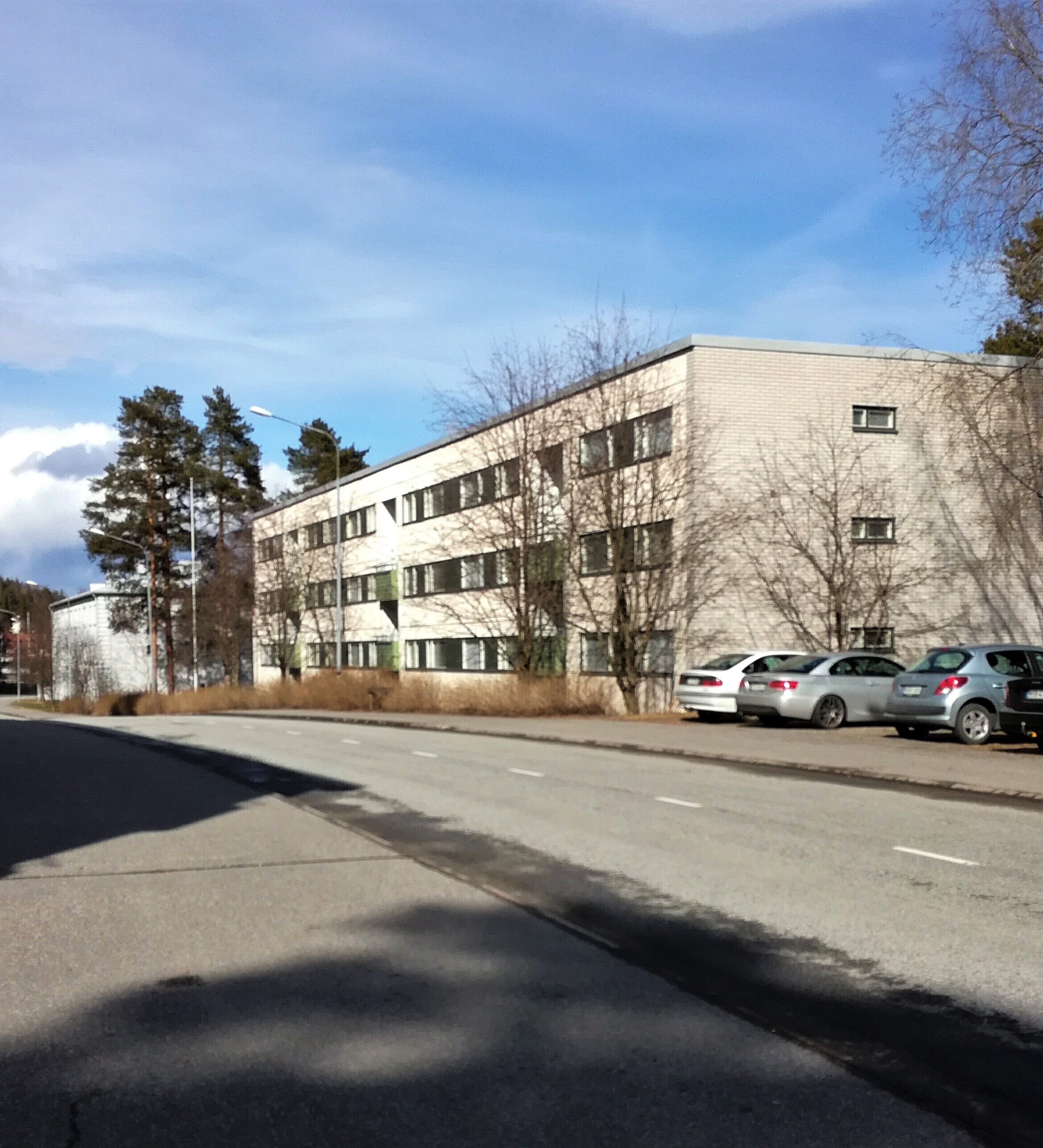
A street view to Haapatie
