= Leppävesi =

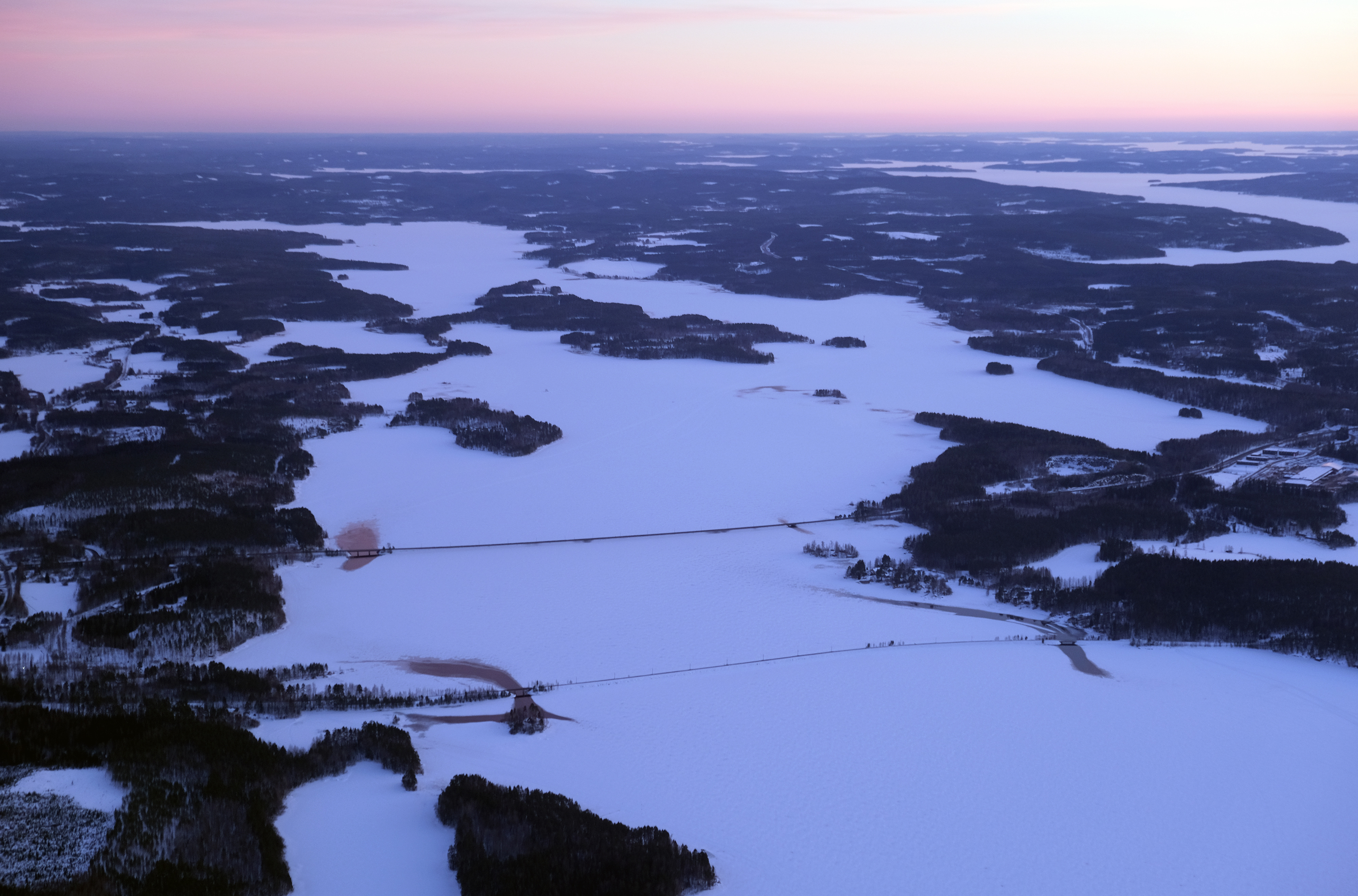
- European route E63 over frozen Lake Leppävesi

- Location within Finland
- Coordinates: 62°15′N 25°57′E
- Lake type: lake
- Primary outflows: Vaajavirta
- Catchment area: Kymijoki
- Basin countries: Finland
- Max. length: 30 km (19 mi)
- Max. width: 2 km (1.2 mi)
- Surface area: 63.59 km^{2} (24.55 sq mi)
- Average depth: 9.43 m (30.9 ft)
- Max. depth: 45 m (148 ft)
- Water volume: 0.6 km^{3} (490,000 acre⋅ft)
- Shore length^{1}: 226.9 km (141.0 mi)
- Surface elevation: 80.8 m (265 ft)
- Frozen: December–April
- Islands: Kuusisaari, Pyhäsaari, Oravasaari
- Settlements: Jyväskylä
- ^{1} Shore length is not a well-defined measure.

Leppävesi (Finnish: [ˈlepːæˌʋesi]) is the 65th (63.59 km^{2}) largest lake of Finland in municipalities Jyväskylä, Laukaa and Toivakka in Central Finland. It is quite a narrow but long lake in the south-north direction with a surface area of 63.59 km². It flows to Päijänne via Vaajavirta. It is part of Keitele Canal, a waterway connecting Lake Keitele and Päijänne. National road 9 and Pieksämäki–Jyväskylä railway cross the lake.

== See also ==
- List of lakes in Finland
- Media related to Leppävesi at Wikimedia Commons
