= Palokka-Puuppola =

- Ward of Jyväskylä
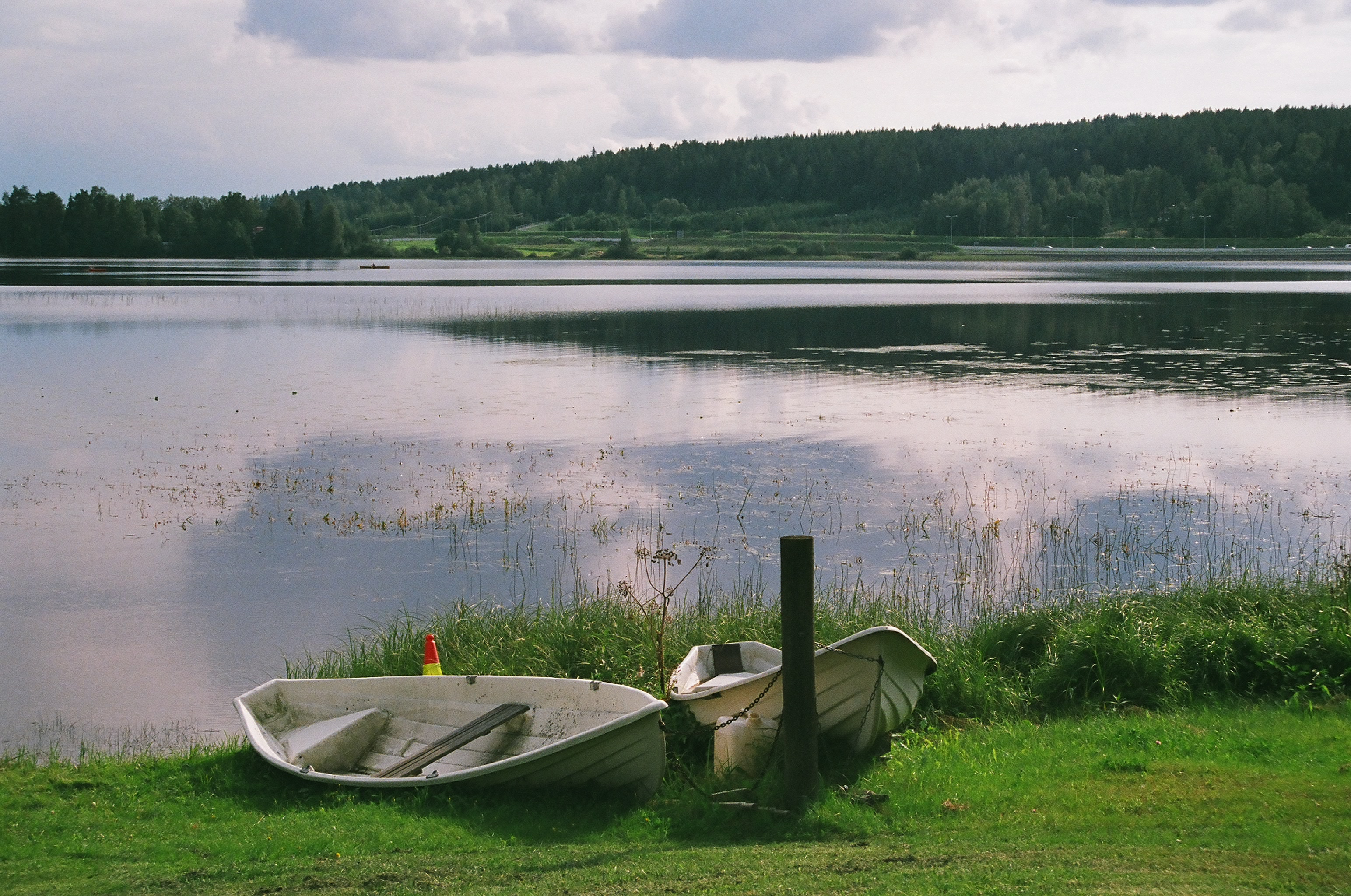
- Lake Palokkajärvi
- Country: Finland
- Province: Western Finland
- Region: Central Finland
- Sub-region: Jyväskylä sub-region
- City: Jyväskylä
- Ward: Palokka-Puuppola

Population (November 2010)
  - Total: 14,395
- Time zone: UTC+2 (EET)
  - Summer (DST): UTC+3 (EEST)

Palokka-Puuppola is a ward of Jyväskylä, Finland. It is located north from the city centre on both sides of European route E75 road. There are many lakes in the area, the biggest of them being Palokkajärvi and Alvajärvi. As of November 2010 the population of Palokka-Puuppola was 14,395.

The Palokka-Puuppola ward is divided into 12 different districts.

== Population of neighbourhoods of Palokka-Puuppola in 2007 ==
- 41. Palokka
- 42. Mannisenmäki
- 43. Rippalanmäki
- 44. Haukkamäki (2,386)
- 45. Kirri, (population 958)
- 46. Heikkilä (2,330)
- 47. Pappilanvuori (2,476)
- 49. Hiekkapohja (200)
- 50. Matinmäki
- 51. Jylhänperä
- 52. Puuppola (1,338)
- 53. Saarenmaa (935)
- 57. Vertaala
