= Tuomiojärvi =

Lake in Jyväskylä, Finland

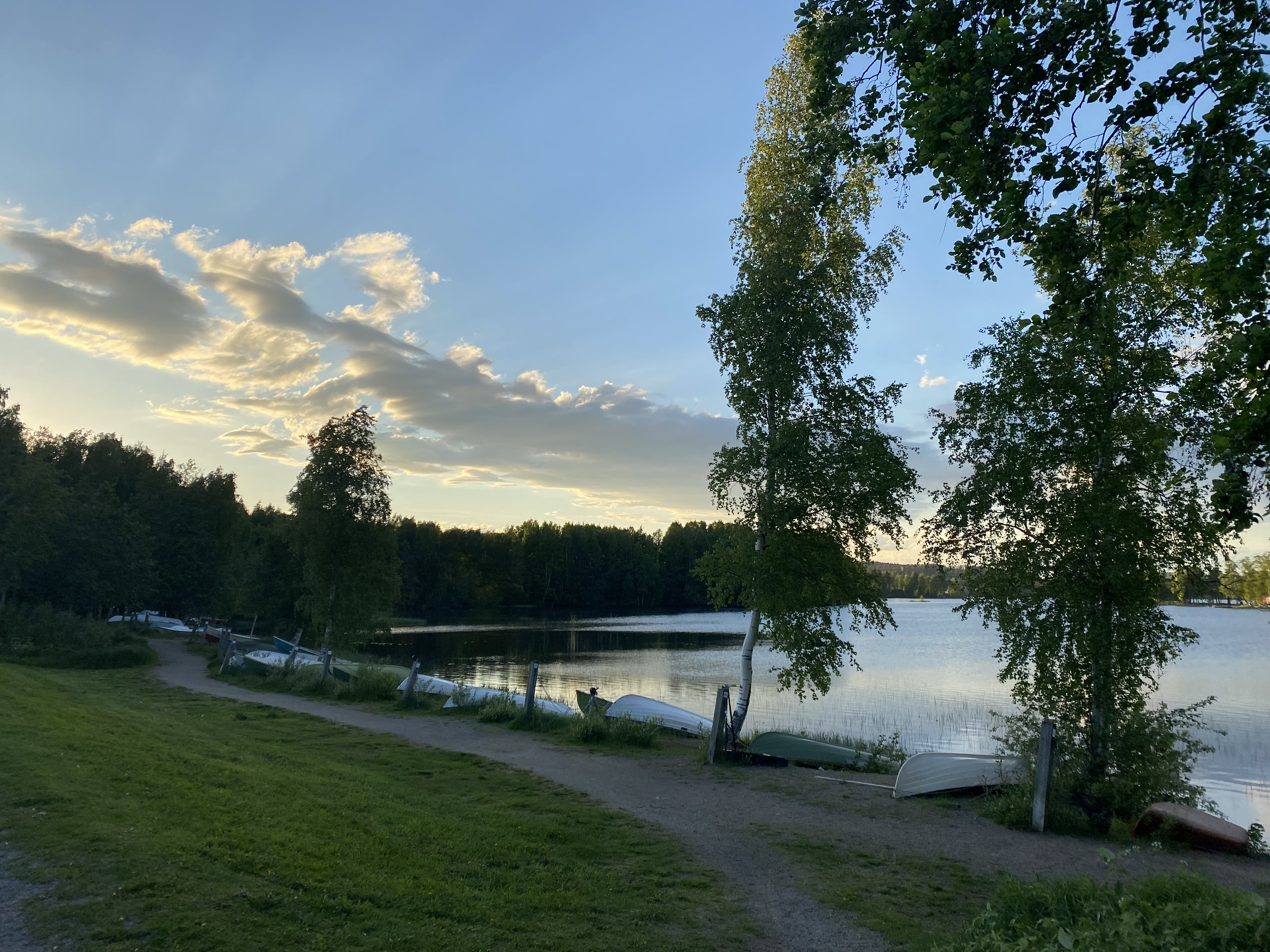
- Interactive map of Tuomiojärvi
- Location: Jyväskylä, Central Finland
- Coordinates: 62.264°N 25.715°E
- Primary inflows: Syväoja, Eerolanpuro
- Primary outflows: Löylyjoki (to Palokkajärvi)
- Catchment area: 55.4 km^{2} (21.4 sq mi)
- Basin countries: Finland
- Max. length: 3.8 km (2.4 mi)
- Max. width: 2.0 km (1.2 mi)
- Surface area: 297.92 ha (736.2 acres)
- Average depth: 3.46 m (11.4 ft)
- Max. depth: 13.1 m (43 ft)
- Water volume: 10,312,100 m^{3} (364,170,000 cu ft)
- Residence time: 9.5 months
- Shore length^{1}: 16.7 km (10.4 mi)
- Surface elevation: 94.4 m (310 ft)
- Islands: 7
- Settlements: Laajavuori, Kortepohja, Viitaniemi, Taulumäki, Mannila, Haukkala
- ^{1} Shore length is not a well-defined measure.

Tuomiojärvi is a lake in the urban area of the city of Jyväskylä in Central Finland. The lake covers 298 hectares, is 3.8 kilometres long and 2.0 kilometres wide, and has seven islands; its average depth is 3.5 metres and its maximum depth 13.1 metres. It belongs to the Kymijoki main catchment area and drains into the neighbouring Palokkajärvi through the short Löylyjoki river. The shores are largely built up: the residential areas of Laajavuori, Kortepohja, Viitaniemi, Taulumäki, Mannila and Haukkala all lie on the lake, which has four public beaches. There are two similarly named lakes within the catchment area of Tuomiojärvi: Ylä-Tuomiojärvi and Vähä Tuomiojärvi, both of which are located near Saarenmaa.

Tuomiojärvi is the raw water source of Jyväskylä's surface water plant at Viitaniemi, and its water quality has been monitored since 1969. Decades of nutrient loading left it with a moderate ecological status, and its southern deep is aerated year-round to limit internal loading; in the 2019 classification of Finnish surface waters its status was upgraded to good. The Eerolanlahti and Rautpohja bays at its southern end form a Natura 2000 urban wetland reserve that hosts the largest black-headed gull colony in Central Finland.

== Etymology ==
The name of Tuomiojärvi appears to contain the word tuomio, meaning 'sentence' or 'judgment'. According to linguist Viljo Nissilä, the name of the lake may refer to local court hearings regarding hunting grounds, as minor conflicts such as theft were often settled by the place where they had happened. The 1977 local history of the former municipality of Jyväskylän maalaiskunta and the city's 2012 restoration plan likewise connect the name to an old court hearing over wilderness hunting rights.

== Geography ==
Tuomiojärvi has a surface area of 298 hectares (3.0 km²) and is 3.8 kilometres long and 2.0 kilometres wide. Its shoreline is otherwise fairly simple in outline, but at the south-western end the 1.1-kilometre-long Haukanniemi peninsula shelters the equally long Rautpohja bay, which is gradually becoming overgrown. The lake has been sounded and depth charts of it have been published: its volume is 10.31 million cubic metres, its mean depth is 3.5 metres and its maximum depth 13.1 metres, the deepest points being off Mannila and in the south-eastern part of the lake. The lake is elongated and fairly shallow, and consists of two basins: a smaller northern basin of about 0.5 km² and a larger southern basin of about 2.6 km², separated by a narrows at Leponiemi where the mean depth is only about 3 metres. The theoretical residence time of its water is 9.5 months. The shoreline is 16.7 kilometres long, and the shores are mostly residential areas or forest. There are mires and wetlands around Haukanniemi, and the Vasaraisensuo mire lies at the northern end of the lake.

The residential areas on the lake are Laajavuori, Kortepohja, Viitaniemi and Taulumäki in the south, Mannila and Rantue on the eastern shore, Haukkala on the western shore and Savulahti in the north; Palokka lies somewhat further from the shore. The Rautpohja industrial area lies at the southern end of the lake and Palokka's commercial centre at the northern end. National road 4 skirts the lake on the narrow isthmus between it and Palokkajärvi, and the lake is otherwise circled by the connecting roads 16685 and 16686 and, in the south, by the city's street network.

=== Islands ===
The number of islands depends on the source: the current base map shows seven, base maps from the 1960s eleven, and the city's 2012 restoration plan eight. Four of the islands lie in the southern part of the lake – Koivusaari, Lehtisaari, Mäntysaari and an unnamed islet – and three in the north: Heinäsaari, Lehtosaari and another unnamed islet. Older base maps and the city's own map service additionally name an island called Hiekkaranta, also known as Muurahaissaari, and give Selkäsaari as an alternative name for Mäntysaari. The largest islands have summer cottages. Lehtisaari is owned by the parish of Jyväskylä (Jyväskylän seurakunta), which operates a public sauna on the island; in summer there are regular boat connections to it.

=== Hydrology ===
Tuomiojärvi is located in the Kymijoki main catchment area (basin number 14) and is part of its second-order Päijänne basin, the Greater Päijänne area (14.2). Within it, the lake belongs to the Tuomiojärvi–Palokkajärvi catchment area (14.29) and its immediate sub-area (14.291), and its identification number in the Finnish lake register is 14.291.1.002. The catchment area of Tuomiojärvi covers an area of 55.4 square kilometres (21.4 sq mi), of which 57.5% is dense forest and 15.9% is sparse forest. The catchment area includes a part of central Jyväskylä from Kortepohja to Mäki-Matti, as well as most of western Palokka. It also extends further west into less urbanized parts of Jyväskylä, such as Ruoke and Saarenmaa.

The largest inflow of Tuomiojärvi is Syväoja, which discharges into the northern part of the lake near Haukkala. It also has the largest basin (14.293) of all of the lake's inflows, whose main path begins from lake Kaitajärvi in Saarenmaa, flowing through Ylä-Tuomiojärvi (76 ha) and Myllyjärvi (16 ha) before discharging into Tuomiojärvi; Syväoja is estimated to carry about two-thirds of the external load reaching the lake from its catchment. Other lakes within the Syväoja basin include Lummelampi (11 ha), Majajärvi (6 ha) and Ruokepuolinen (29 ha) near Ruoke, and Hanhijärvi near Hanhiperä. Several small lakes close to Tuomiojärvi drain into it through their own outlets: Vuorilampi (2 ha) in Laajavuori; Vehkalampi (0.6 ha) in Kortepohja, which in turn receives the outflow of Vasikkalampi (3 ha); and Mustalampi (1 ha) at Rimminmäki, which also drains into the northern end of the lake. Vehkalampi lies on the course of Eerolanpuro, a brook which begins in the industrial area of Rautpohja and discharges into the Eerolanlahti bay in the southern part of the lake.

Tuomiojärvi itself discharges into Palokkajärvi (258 ha) via the Löylyjoki, a river only about 120 metres long which flows under national road 4 in Taulumäki; from Palokkajärvi the water continues through the Tourujoki into Jyväsjärvi and on to Päijänne. Both lakes are on the same level. The mean outflow of the lake is about 0.43 cubic metres per second; a single measurement on the Löylyjoki in late September 2012, used for the city's nutrient budget of the lake, gave 1.05 cubic metres per second.

=== Water level regulation ===
The surface of Tuomiojärvi lies at 94.4 metres above sea level. The lake is regulated; the base map gives its regulation limits as 93.74 and 94.64 metres above sea level. In practice the level of Tuomiojärvi follows that of Palokkajärvi, which is regulated by a dam in the upper part of the Tourujoki, the outflow of Palokkajärvi. According to the city's 2012 restoration plan, which uses the older NN height system, the regulation limits of that dam are 93.50 and 94.40 metres (94.30 metres in July and August), and the level of Palokkajärvi varied between 93.50 and 94.80 metres in 1970–2010; because of this regulation the Löylyjoki has occasionally been observed flowing backwards, from Palokkajärvi into Tuomiojärvi. There is also a dam under the road bridge that can be used to regulate the level of Tuomiojärvi without affecting Palokkajärvi's level, but it is rarely used. On the 1963 base map the water level of the lake was given as 94.0 metres, whereas later maps give 94.4 metres.

== Water quality ==
Tuomiojärvi is classified as a small humic lake. Because it serves as a raw water source, its water quality has been monitored closely since 1969, with sampling concentrated on the southern basin from which the water is drawn. The water is slightly brown and the lake is mildly eutrophic by its nutrient levels: in the 2000s total phosphorus in the surface water has been around 16–19 µg/l, lower than in the 1980s and 1990s, total nitrogen about 500 µg/l and chlorophyll-a about 10 µg/l, on the boundary between mildly eutrophic and eutrophic, while the pH is neutral. Blue-green algae occur in the lake every summer, though the blooms have usually been short-lived.

The external nutrient load on the lake has decreased from the levels of recent decades. The Palokka landfill, which operated in the catchment from 1978 to the end of 1999 and whose leachate drains to the northern end of the lake, has been closed and landscaped, and although loading from agriculture has declined, loading from stormwater and from unsewered scattered settlement has increased. The condition of the lake has long been determined by continuous internal loading left behind by this earlier pollution: the deeps become depleted of oxygen at the end of winter and at the end of summer, releasing nutrients, iron and manganese from the sediment. To curb the internal loading, and to keep manganese out of the raw water, the southern deep has been artificially aerated for decades, and since 2011 the aerators have run all year round.

In the first two classification rounds of Finnish surface waters (published in 2008 and 2013) the ecological status of Tuomiojärvi was moderate, mainly on account of the structure of its benthic invertebrate community, but also because of a fairly high phytoplankton biomass, the annual blue-green algae blooms and the oxygen depletion of the bottom water during stratification. The lake was included in the Central Finland surface and groundwater action programme for 2010–2015, which set the goal of bringing it to good ecological status by 2021, and the city drew up a restoration plan for it in 2012. In the third classification round (2019), which underlies the water management programme for 2022–2027, the status of Tuomiojärvi was upgraded from moderate to good – one of the few changes in Central Finland attributed to a real change in the water body rather than to new monitoring data or methods. The city credited the improvement to the extension of the sewer network in the upstream catchment and to the routing of stormwater through constructed wetlands, the first of which was built on the lakeshore at Kortesuo in 2016. As of 2026, the lake is still listed as being in good status.

== Water supply and recreation ==
Tuomiojärvi is the raw water source of the Viitaniemi surface water plant, operated by the utility Jyväskylän Energia, which draws its water from the lake's southern deep. In 2011 the plant produced about 3 million cubic metres of drinking and process water, 29% of the water supplied in the city; keeping manganese in the raw water below the drinking-water limit has been a recurring problem.

The city maintains four public beaches on the lake: the Tuomiojärvi beach at Taulumäki, which is an EU bathing beach with lifeguards in summer and which a 2012 survey found to be the most popular beach in Jyväskylä, and smaller beaches at Viitaniemi, Haukkala and Rantue in Mannila. There are several boat harbours on the shores, the parish's public sauna on Lehtisaari, and some recreational fishing; together with Köhniönjärvi, the lake is covered by the city's recreational fishing arrangements. Haukanniemi is a popular recreation area, and in winter cross-country ski tracks run around the shores.

== Nature ==
=== Fish ===
The lake has been one of the reference lakes of the University of Jyväskylä's Jyväsjärvi research project since 2000, with annual test fishing in August. Test fishing has shown that the fish species include at least perch, pike, ruffe, rainbow trout (stocked), zander, bream, white bream, crucian carp, bleak, whitefish and roach; stone loach and smelt have also been caught but are rarer. The fish stock is more abundant than in the surrounding lakes and is dominated by cyprinids, roach in particular; the pike population is larger than in the neighbouring Alvajärvi and Palokkajärvi, zander reproduces naturally and has not been stocked since the 1990s, and rainbow trout is stocked by the local fishing association.

== Conservation ==
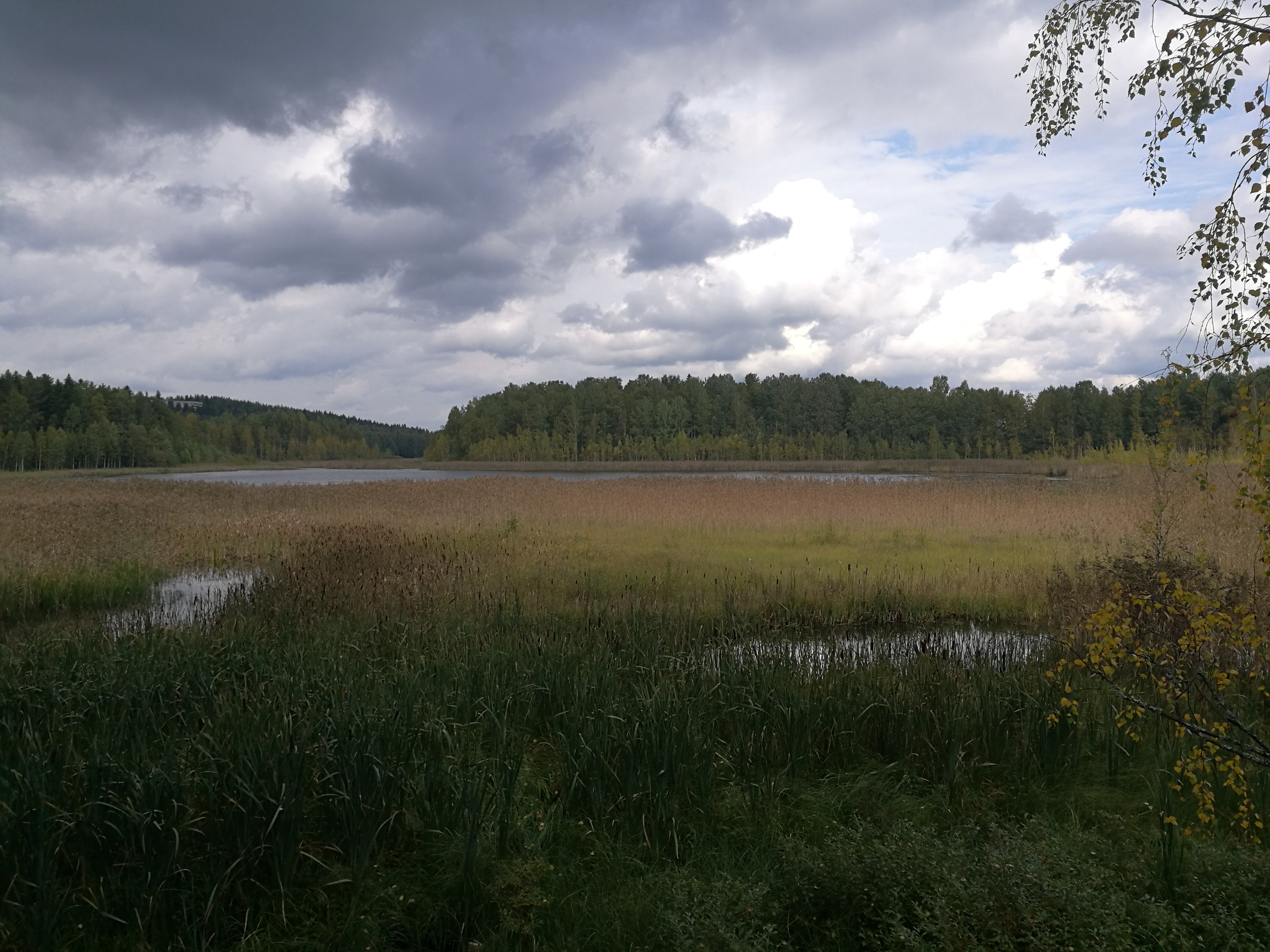
The Rautpohja bay seen from the south, from the bird-watching tower that was demolished in 2024

=== Eerolanlahti and Rautpohja ===
The Rautpohja (also called Rautpohjanlahti) and Eerolanlahti bays in the southern part of the lake form an urban wetland nature reserve, Eerolanlahti–Rautpohjanlahti (FI0900033), which belongs to the Natura 2000 network as both a special area of conservation and a special protection area and includes both bays in their entirety. The reserve covers 43 hectares, of which 5 hectares is land and the rest water. Both bays are also sites of Finland's national waterfowl habitat conservation programme. Rautpohja has largely closed up, with a well-developed marsh fringe around its shores and little open water in the middle, while Eerolanlahti is less overgrown, its marsh consisting of grassy fen and willow thicket. The bays are valued as a nesting site for a fairly diverse community of water and shore birds and as a resting place for migrating birds, although recent construction in the surrounding residential areas, with blocks of flats built on former fields close to the bays, has reduced their value for birdlife. Birds nesting in the bays include whooper swans and black-headed gulls; other notable animals include moor frogs. In the winter of 2011–2012 the marsh fringe of Rautpohja was dredged to create more open water and nesting islets for birds, after which the number of gull pairs nesting on the Rautpohja side increased. A bird-watching tower, completed at the southern end of Rautpohja in August 2007, was found to be dangerously rotten in an inspection in autumn 2024 and was removed at the end of September 2024.

The black-headed gull colony in the area, mostly nesting in the Eerolanlahti, is the largest in the region of Central Finland. Counts of the colony go back to the 1960s: it numbered some 550 pairs in 1978, peaked at about 1,450 pairs in 1988, fell to around 540 pairs in 2002 and had recovered to about 1,000 pairs by 2007. The colony grew further in the early 2010s as the Killervä (also called Killerjärvi), a small lake in the middle of the Killeri harness racing track further west, was dredged to remove gull nests, which had been interfering with the operation of the track. In 2013, there were approximately a thousand pairs nesting in the Eerolanlahti bay, 500 in Rautpohja and only around 40 in Killervä. However, the number of nesting black-headed gulls on Tuomiojärvi has declined in the 2020s, while the Killervä colony has grown again and may now be the largest in Jyväskylä.

=== Vasaraisensuo ===
Vasaraisensuo in October 2024

There is also another wetland in the northern part of the lake in Palokka called Vasaraisensuo, an elongated marsh-type mire which consists of a treeless part in the middle surrounded by swampland dominated by birches and willows. Despite having some drainage ditches dug into it, the wetland has mostly remained in its natural state and the ditches appear to be closing naturally. Vasaraisensuo is not a true conservation area, though its importance for natural diversity has been noted in zoning plans. Stormwater from the commercial area built in Palokka in 2011 is led into a settling basin at the edge of the mire, from which it drains into the mire.
