= Heikkilä =

Heikkilä is a surname originating in Finland. The name is derived from Heikki, the Finnish equivalent of the Scandinavian name Henrik and the Germanic Henry, plus the suffix -lä, a patronymic indicating a child of a household headed by a man named Heikki. Among Finnish immigrants to North America, the name was sometimes Anglicized as Heikkila.

== Geographical distribution ==
As of 2014, 95.2% of all known bearers of the surname Heikkilä were residents of Finland and 3.6% of Sweden.

In Finland, the frequency of the surname was higher than national average (1:378) in the following regions:

1. Lapland (1:208)
2. North Ostrobothnia (1:215)
3. Tavastia Proper (1:239)
4. Kymenlaakso (1:243)
5. Pirkanmaa (1:265)
6. Central Ostrobothnia (1:266)
7. Southwest Finland (1:271)
8. South Ostrobothnia (1:278)
9. Satakunta (1:279)

== Notable people ==
- Aapo Heikkilä (born 1994), Finnish footballer
- Antti Heikkilä (born 1943), Finnish ice hockey player
- Emma Heikkilä (born 1996), Finnish footballer
- Erkki Heikkilä (1924–2000), Finnish field hockey player
- Ilkka Heikkilä (born 1988), Finnish ice hockey centre
- Jukka M. Heikkilä (born 1966), Finnish author
- Jussi Heikkilä (born 1983), Finnish hurdler
- Kari Heikkilä (born 1960), Finnish ice hockey skater
- Kyle Heikkila (born 1971), United States Virgin Islands luger
- Lasse Heikkilä (born 1934), Finnish ice hockey skater
- Lauri Heikkilä (1957–2024), Finnish politician
- Marja Heikkilä (born 1977), Finnish freestyle swimmer
- Miika Heikkilä (born 1992), Finnish ice hockey player
- Mikko Heikkilä (born 1992), Finnish rally driver
- Samu Heikkilä (born 1971), Finnish film editor
- Seth Heikkilä (1863–1938), Finnish journalist, writer and politician
- Simo Heikkilä (born 1943), Finnish designer
- Sisko Heikkilä (1921–1997), Finnish athlete
- Tapio Heikkilä (born 1990), Finnish football player
- Toivo Heikkilä (1906–1976), Finnish diplomat
- Tomi-Pekka Heikkilä (born 1992), Finnish sport shooter
- Tuomas Heikkilä, Finnish orienteering competitor and long-distance runner
- William Heikkila (born 1944), Canadian athlete
