= Kortepohja =

- District of Jyväskylä
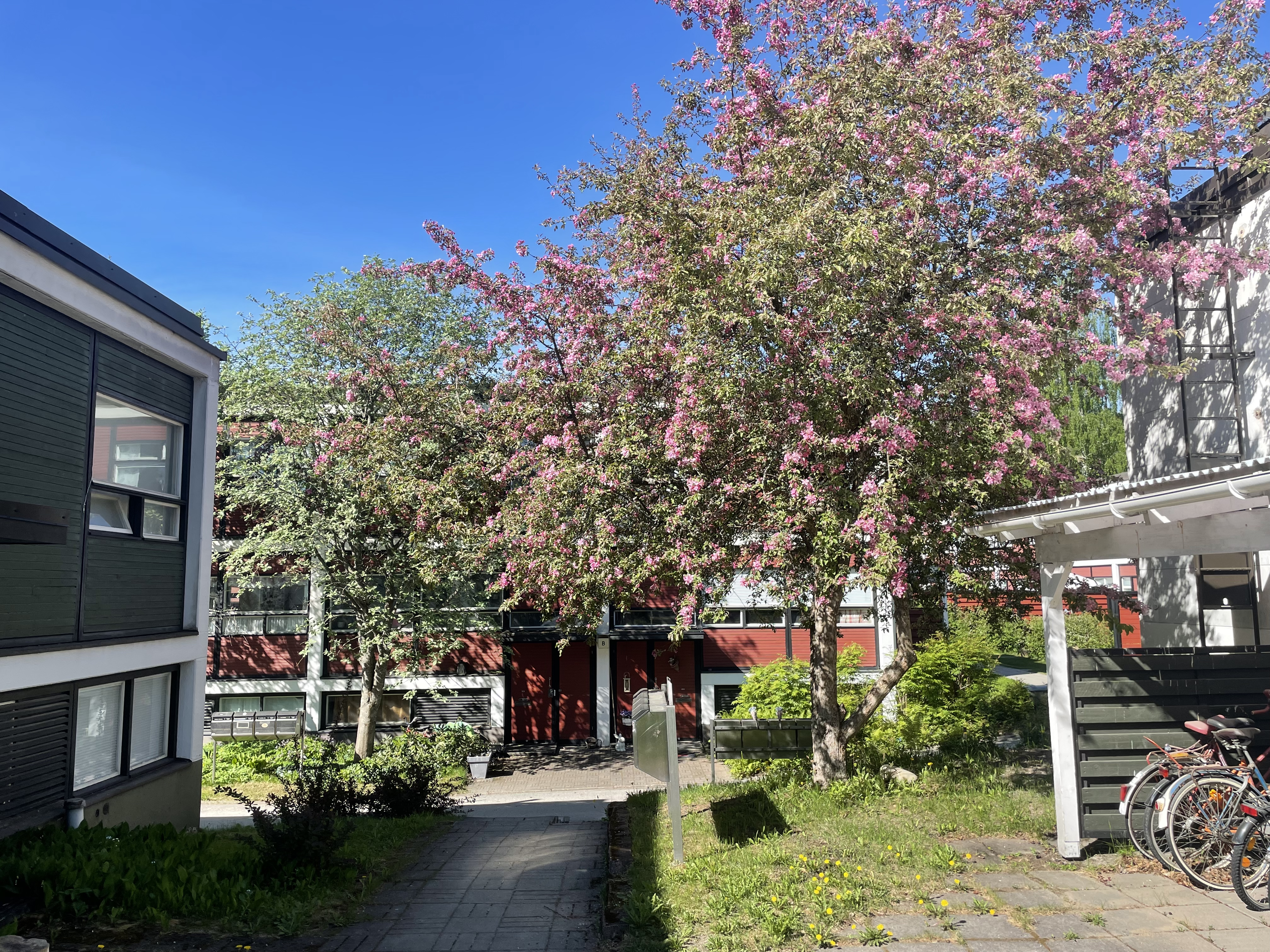
- The Kortepohja residential area, showcasing 1960s architecture
- Coordinates: 62°14′56.92″N 25°42′26.59″E
- Country: Finland
- Province: Western Finland
- Region: Central Finland
- Sub-region: Jyväskylä sub-region
- City: Jyväskylä
- Ward: Kypärämäki-Kortepohja

Population (2020)
  - Total: 8,084
- Time zone: UTC+2 (EET)
  - Summer (DST): UTC+3 (EEST)
- Postal code: 40740 JYVÄSKYLÄ

Kortepohja is a district in Jyväskylä, Finland. It is located approximately 2.5 kilometres (1.6 mi) from the city centre on the western side of Lake Tuomiojärvi. The population of Kortepohja was 8,084 in December 2020.

Neighborhoods of the district include Ylioppilaskylä, Kortesuo, Kortemäki, Korteniitty, Laajavuori and Haukkala. The statistical divisions of Kortepohja are Kortesuo, Ylioppilaskylä, Kortekeskus, Korteranta, Kortemäki and Laajavuori-Haukkala.

The Laajavuori ski resort is located in the district. A child psychiatric institute is located in Haukkala.

== History ==
The area of modern Kortepohja was initially owned by the Nisula farm, which was established in 1607. The farm was eventually acquired by the Schildt family. The Schildts built a new main building in the late 1930s, which became the Kortesuo manor. Its name literally means "horsetail marsh", referring to the nearby environment. The older Nisula manor became the Jyvälä settlement.

The areas around the Kortesuo manor were transferred from Jyväskylän maalaiskunta to the town of Jyväskylä in 1941. The zoning of the area began in 1964. In 1965, professor Ahti Rytkönen invented the name Kortepohja for the upcoming residential area, taking korte- from the name of the Kortesuo manor and -pohja from Rautpohja, the name of a nearby bay in the lake Tuomiojärvi and an industrial area near Mäki-Matti. The residential area was expanded with the construction of the Kortemäki suburb in the 1980s and the Kortesuo suburb in the 1990s.

== Ylioppilaskylä ==
The construction of the "student village" began in the 1960s to solve the issue of finding apartments for students of the Jyväskylä Educational College, the predecessor of the University of Jyväskylä. It is owned by the Student Union of the University of Jyväskylä. Approximately 2 000 students live in the apartments.

== Kortepohja residential area ==
The Kortepohja residential area, built between 1967-1972, is nationally recognized for its architecture and is deemed a representative example of urban planning from the 1960s and new modular construction. This compact residential area with its small-scale buildings is designed in a grid pattern as a tribute to traditional wooden towns. The site is included in the Finnish selection of modern architectural masterpieces approved by the DOCOMOMO organization.

Based on architect Bengt Lundsten's 1964 competition win, the area was significant in many ways in the design of Finnish residential areas during the 1960s. The designer aimed to create an urban, compact living environment with moderately low buildings, arranged in a grid pattern reminiscent of 19th-century urban designs, rather than a residential area placed in a freely forested environment.

== Laajavuori Ski Resort ==
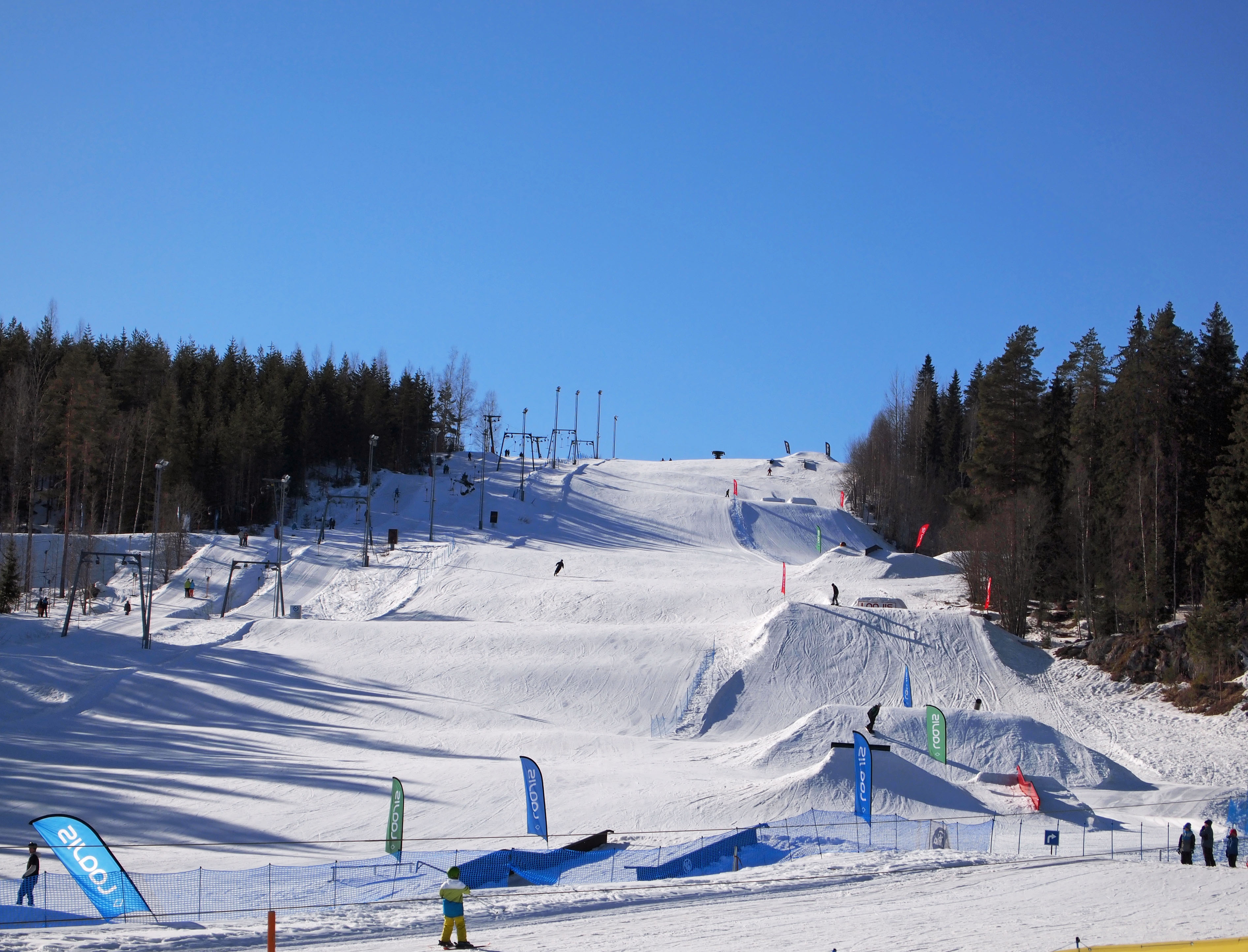
Laajavuori ski run

Laajavuori Ski Resort has 12 slopes and 6 lifts for alpine skiing. The longest slope is 915 meters with 106 meters top vertical. The resort hosts FIS ski slopestyle world cup competitions. Laajavuori forests host 62 kilometres cross country skiing tracks with four lean-tos.

== Gallery ==
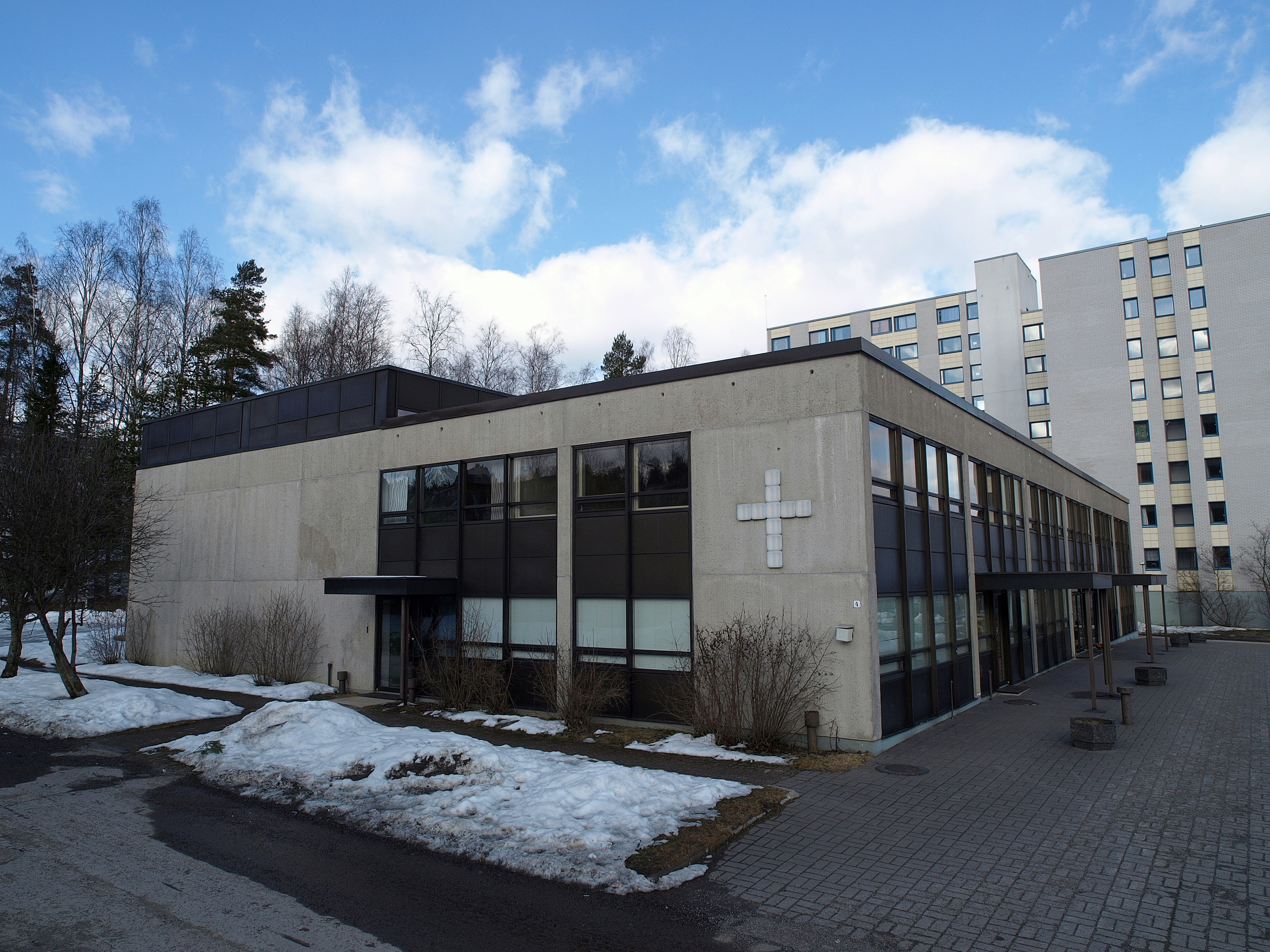
The Kortepohja Church is an example of 1970s architecture

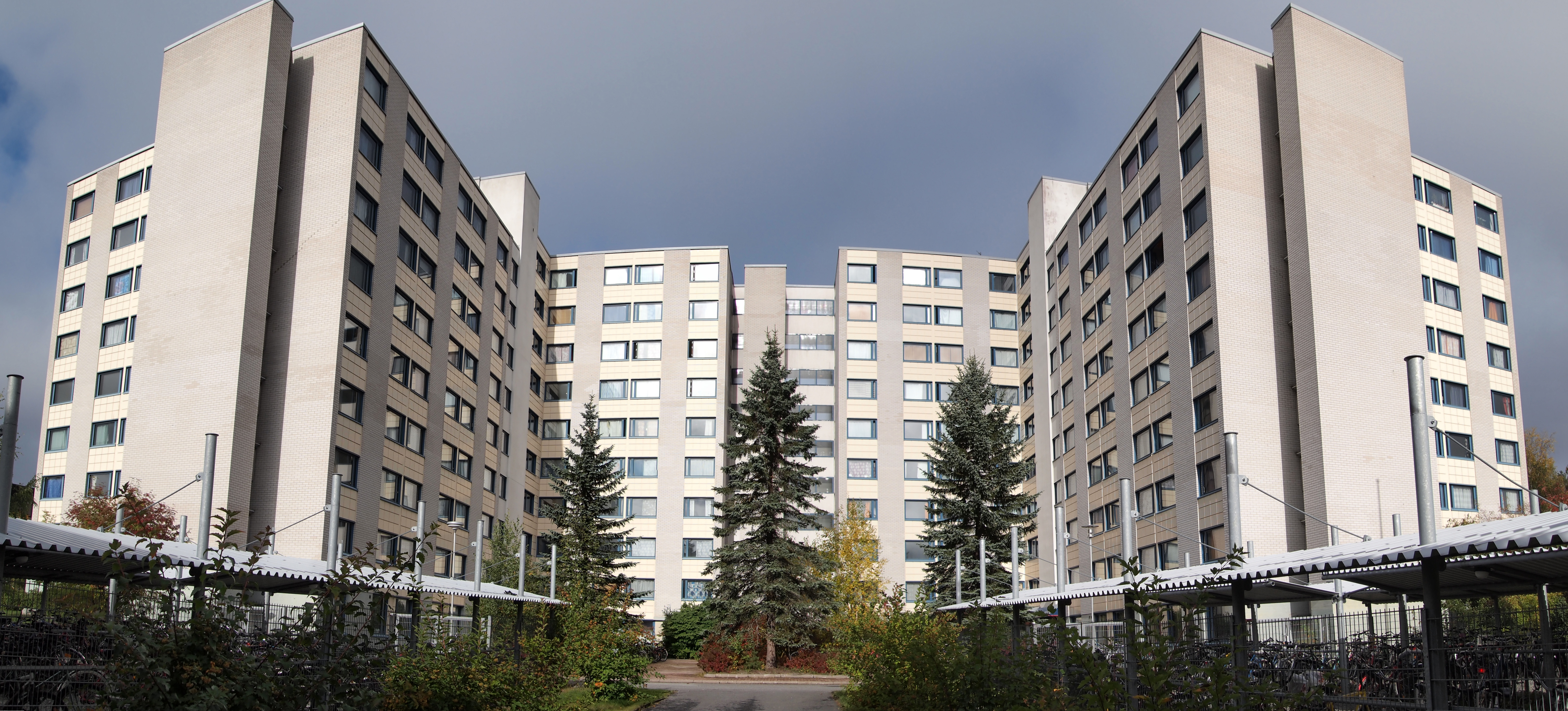
Apartment building on the street Emännäntie

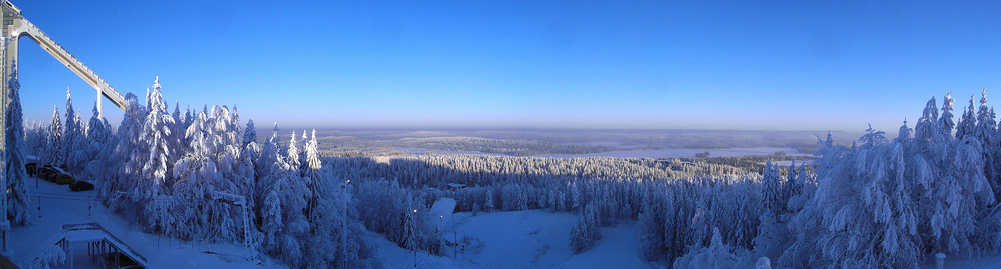
Matti Nykänen ski jump hill in Laajavuori Ski Resort

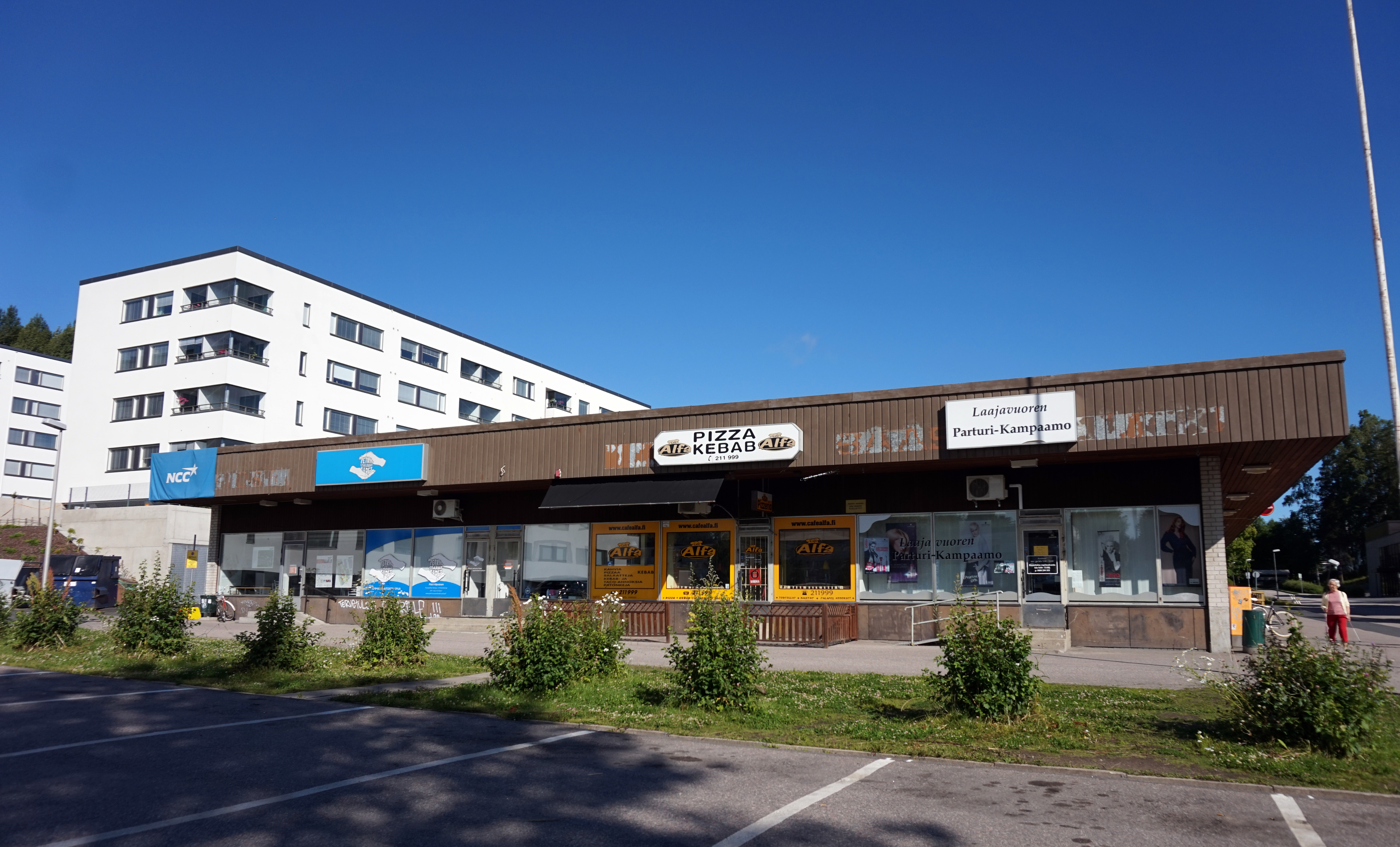
Kortepohja shopping mall

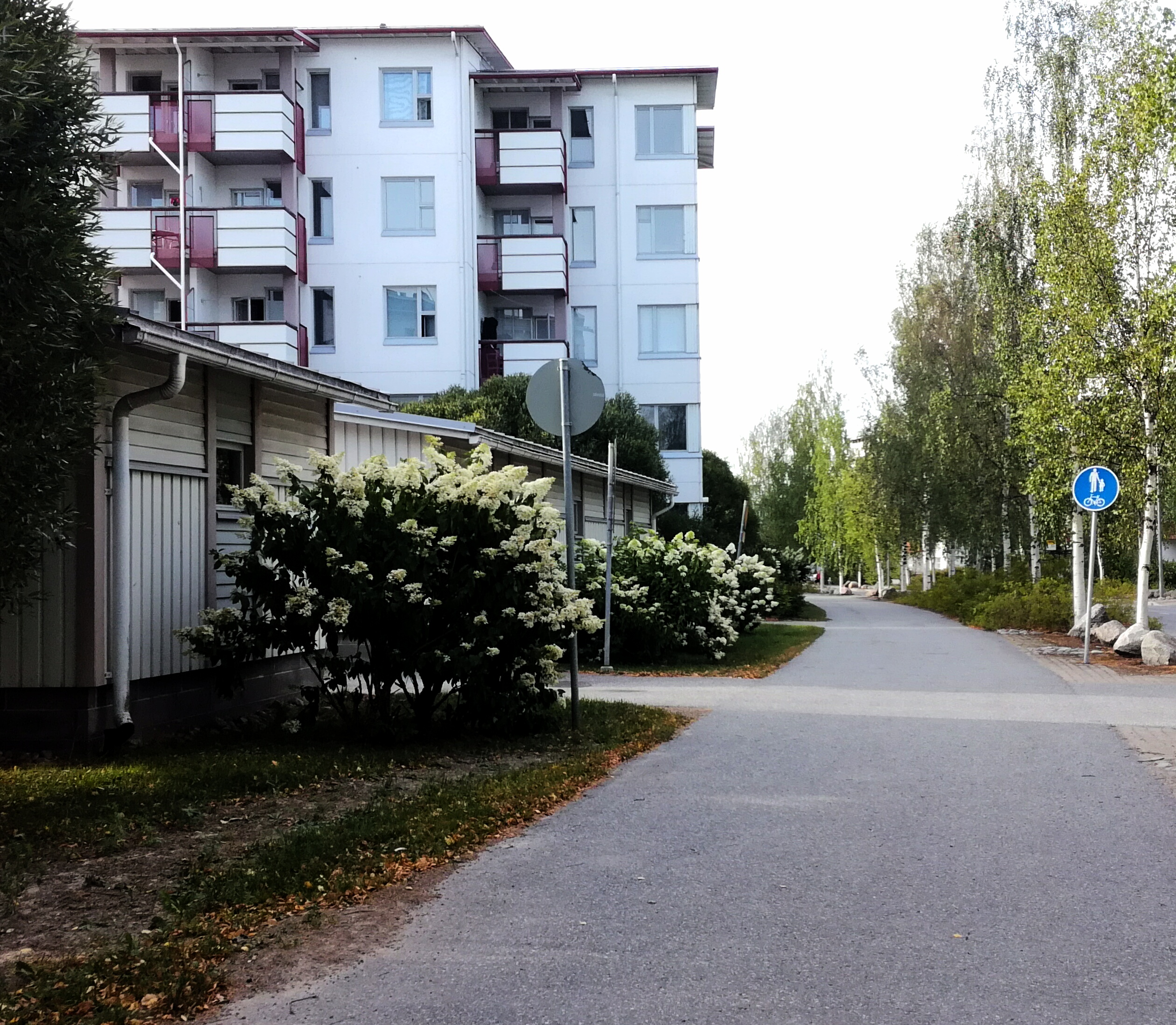
Kortesuo neighborhood

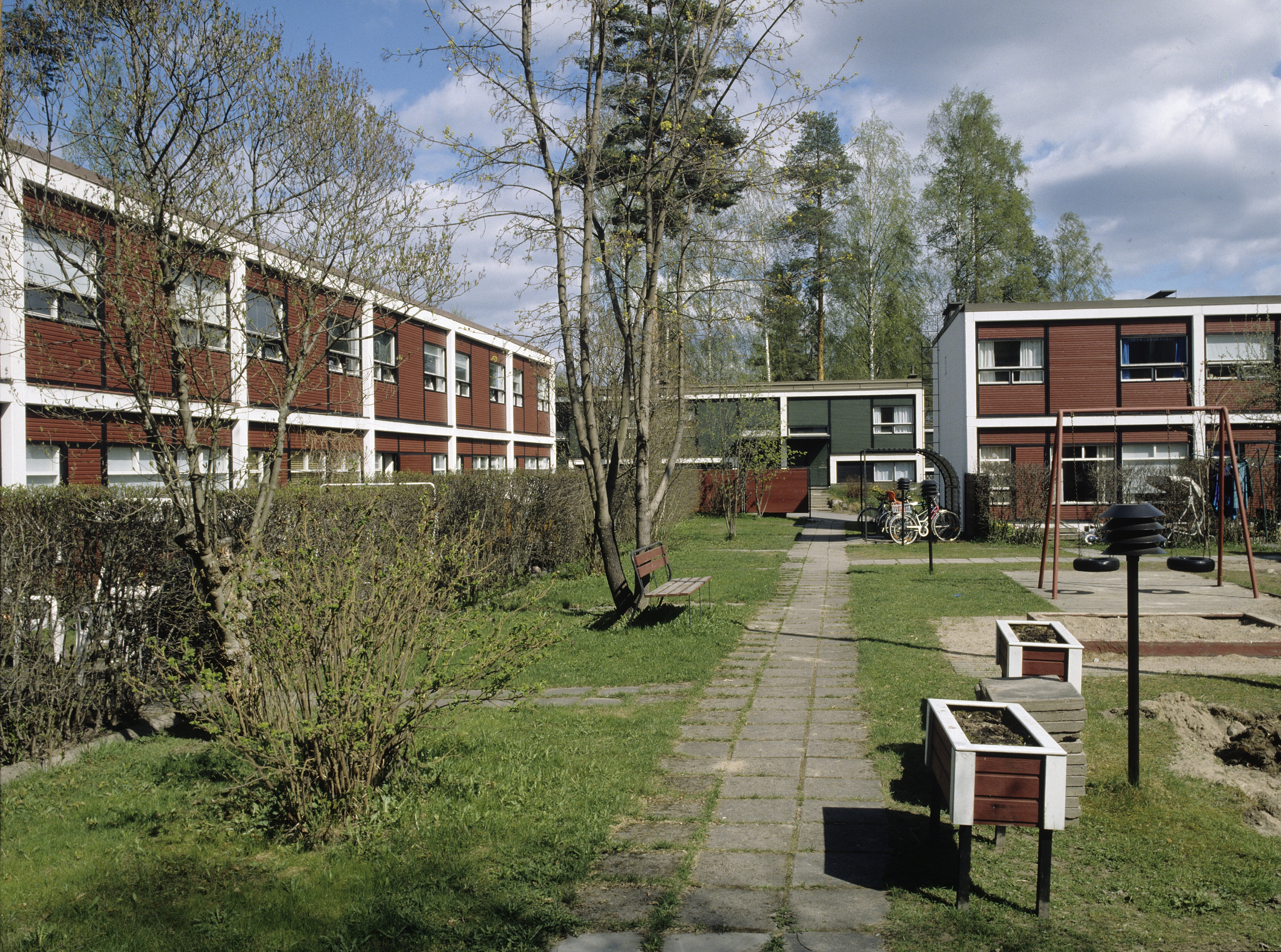
Row houses in Kortepohja

== Notable people ==
- Gettomasa, rapper
- Topi Nättinen, ice hockey player
