= Bengt Lundsten =

Finnish architect and professor (born 1928)

Bengt Harald Lundsten (born 26 February 1928) is a Finnish architect and professor.

== Life and career ==
Bengt Lundsten was born in Turku on 26 February 1928. He started architecture studies after the Second World War. He graduated in 1954 from Helsinki University of Technology in Helsinki. He was active at Viljo Revell's architect bureau 1952–1959 and partner in his agency in Toronto 1959–1961. He started his own architectural practice in Helsinki 1962 and was professor in building theory at the Helsinki University of Technology for 1969–1994. He conducted research on, among other things ecological building materials. He is also known as one of saviors of Puu-Käpylä from massive over-construction in Helsinki.

== Selected works ==
Selected works of Bengt Lundsten
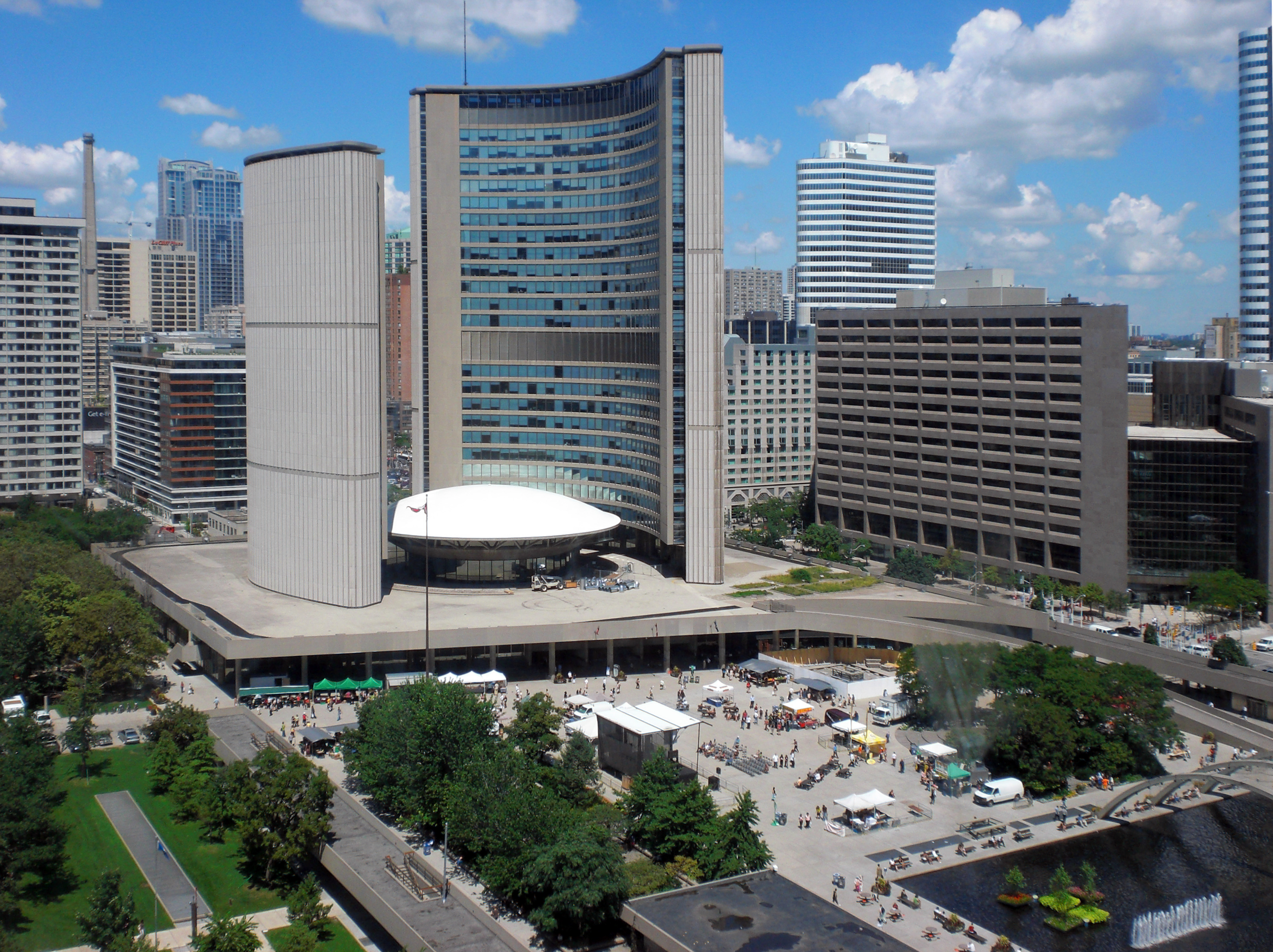
City Hall in Toronto, Canada

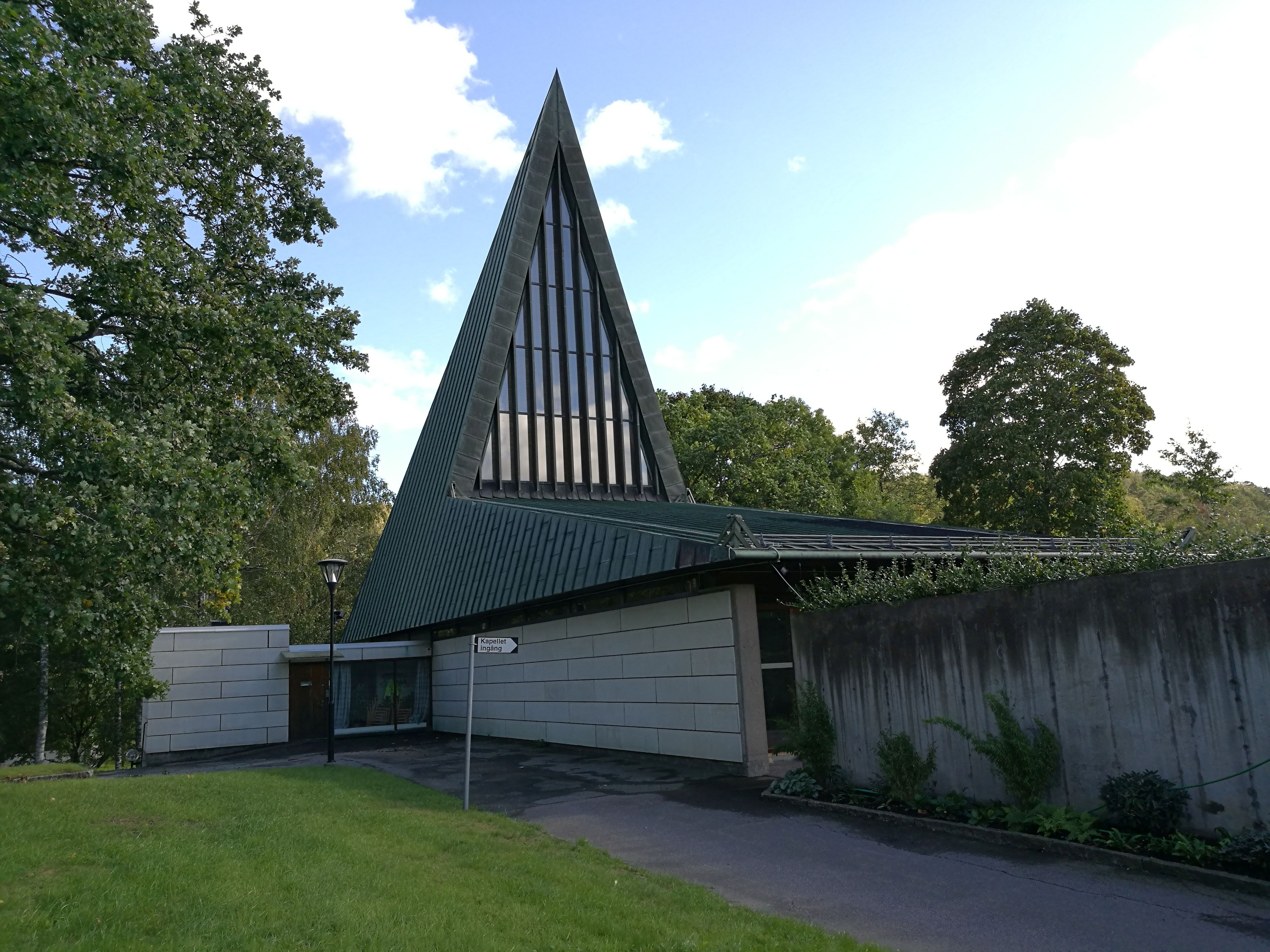
Kvastekulla chapel in Partille, Sweden

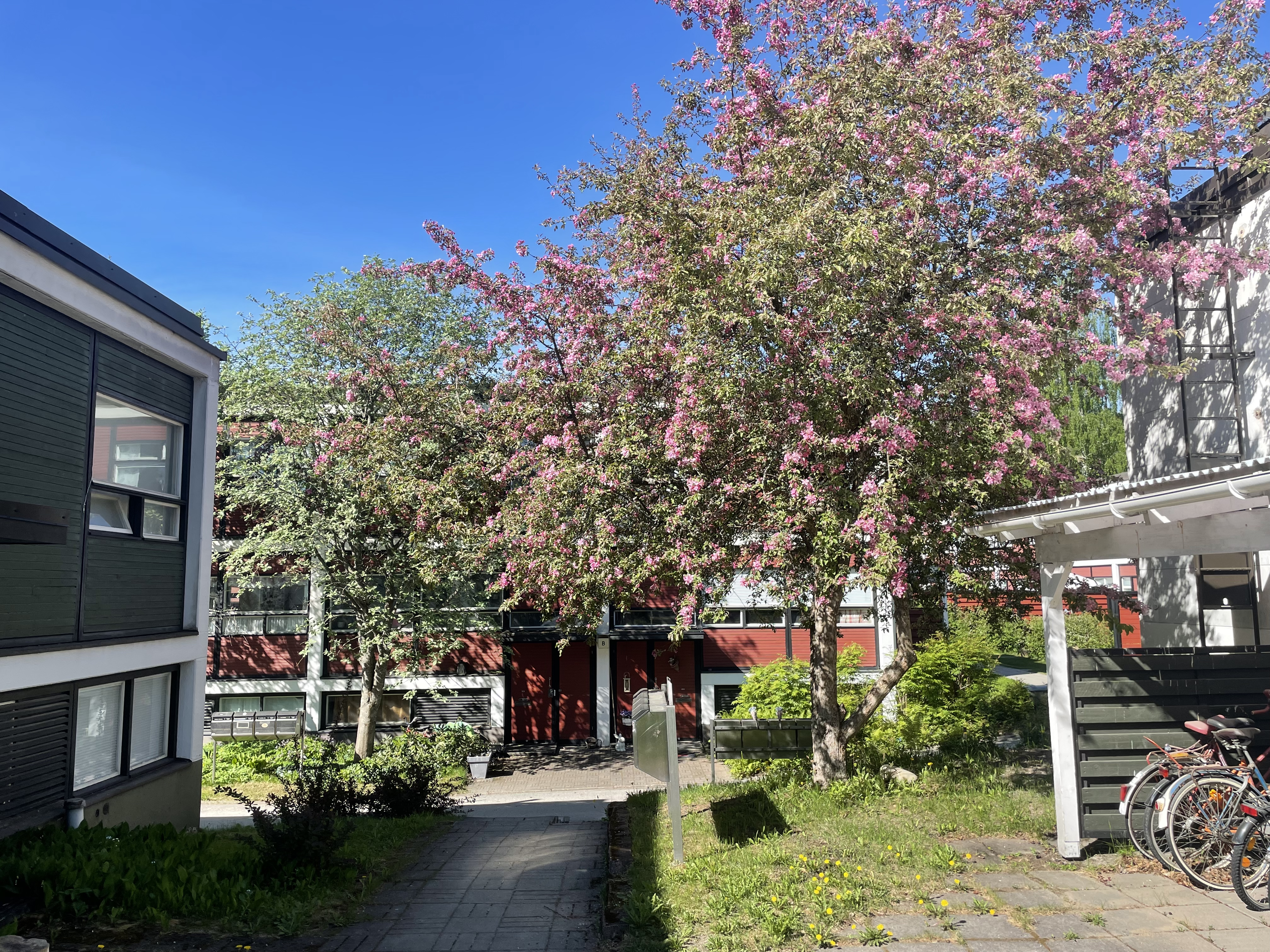
The Kortepohja residential area in Jyväskylä, Finland

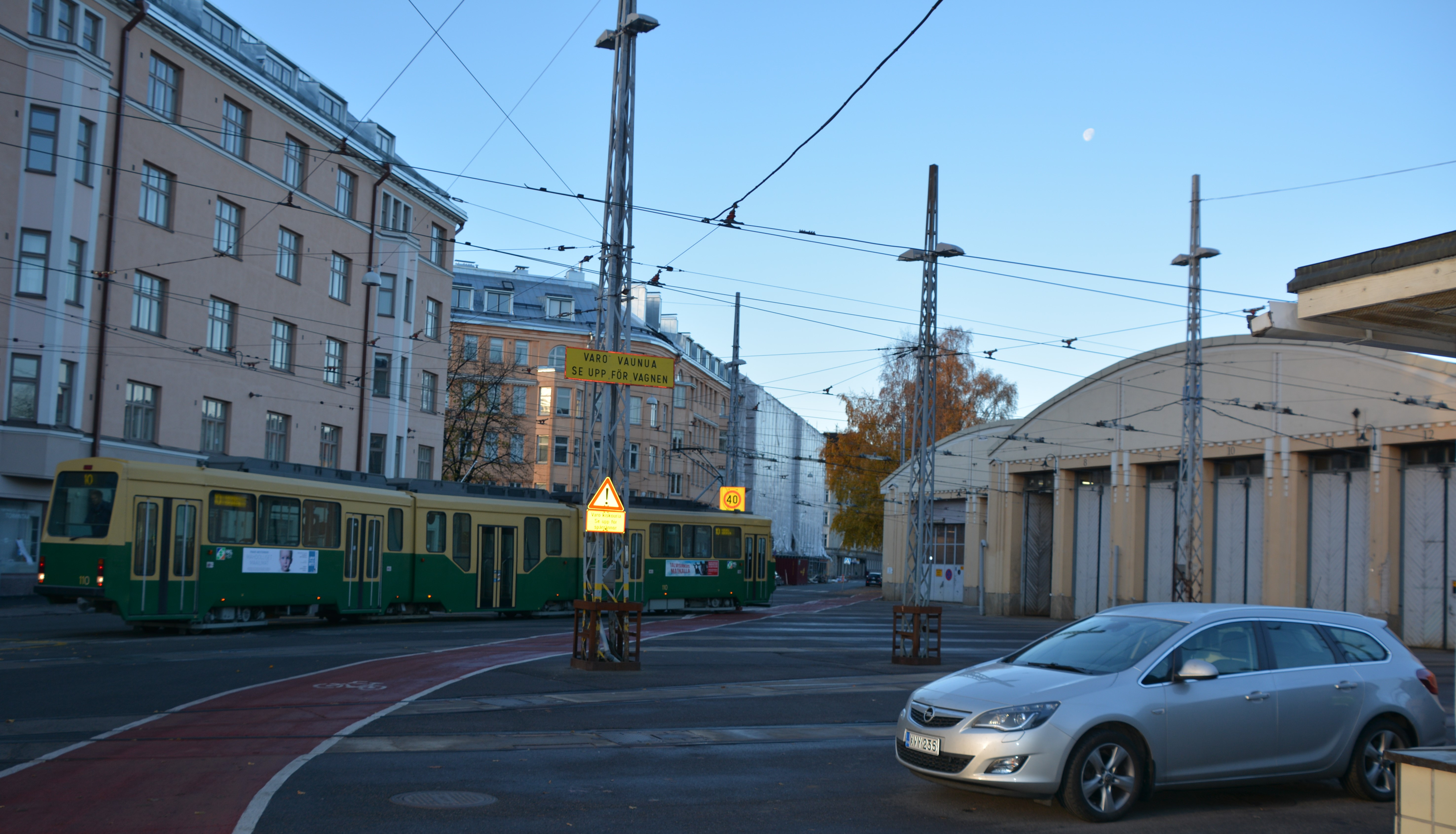
Tram depot in Taka-Töölö, Helsinki, Finland
- co-work on Toronto City Hall architecture in Toronto (1961)
- Kvastekulla cemetery yard with chapel in Swedish Partille (1956–1963)
- The passenger terminal in the ferry port Långnäs at Åland (1965): a glass box, suspended from steel cables in a steel frame (now demolished)
- From 2003 to 2004 he was responsible for the restoration and conversion of the Taka-Töölö (Helsinki) tram depot into a tram and traffic museum, the restoration of the Mauritzberg Castle in Norrköping Municipality (Sweden) and the archipelago center in the village Korpoström (on the Finnish island Korpo).
- A residential area in Kortepohja, Jyväskylä, Finland. The residential area is a representative example of urban planning from the 1960s and new modular construction. This area with its small-scale buildings is designed in a grid pattern as a tribute to traditional wooden towns. The site is included in the Finnish selection of modern architectural masterpieces approved by the DOCOMOMO organization.
