= Toivo Heikkilä =

Finnish diplomat

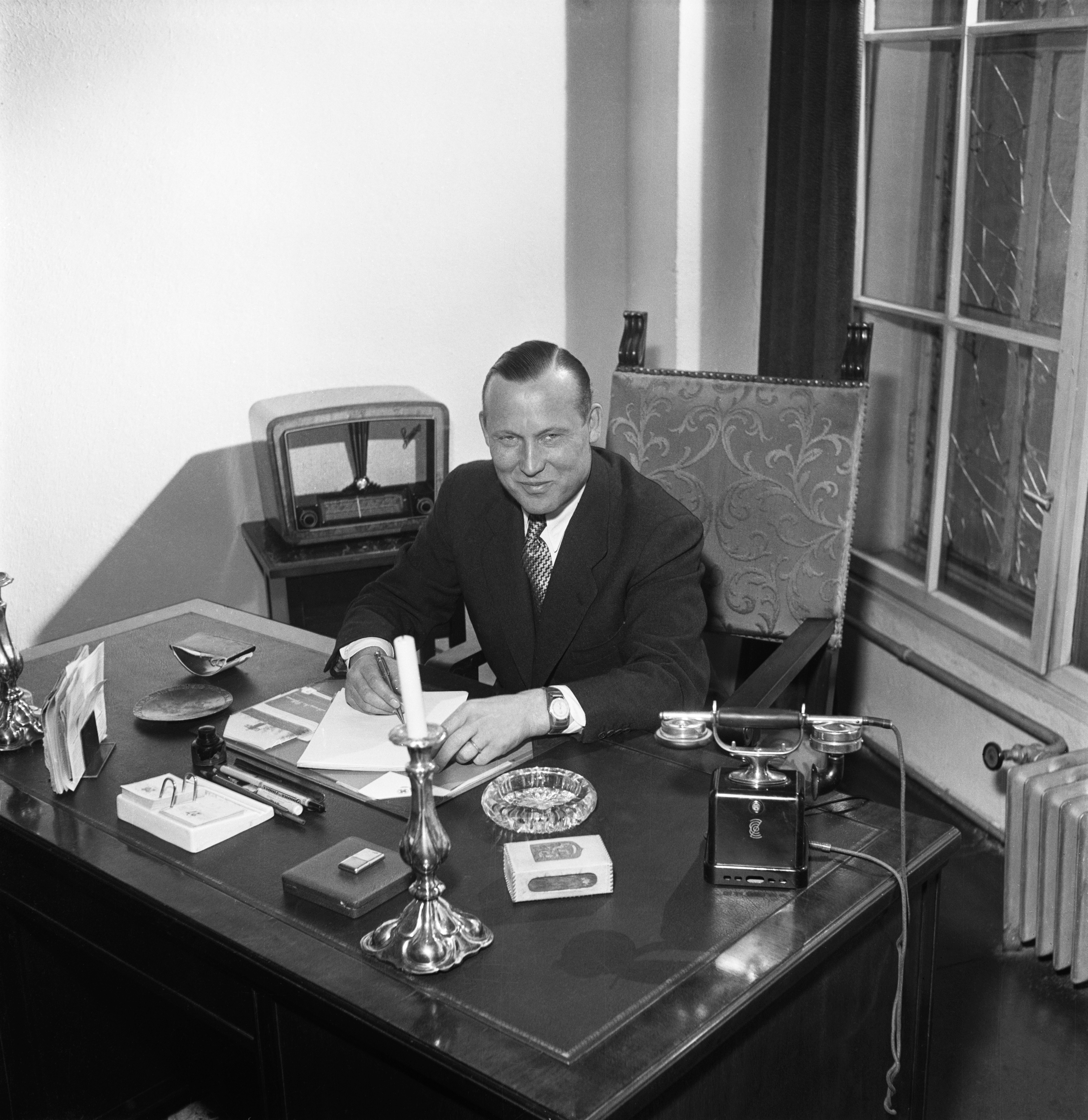
Toivo Heikkilä

Toivo Heikkilä (4 August 1906, in Eräjärvi – 15 May 1976) was a Finnish diplomat. He was a master of philosophy.

Heikkilä worked for the Ministry for Foreign Affairs since 1931. Between 1940 and 1944, he served as secretary general in Berlin and Budapest and between 1948 and 1955 as a commercial representative in Berlin. Between 1944 and 1946, he served as Secretary to Prime Minister J. K. Paasikivi, and between 1946 and 1948 and Mauno Pekkala. From 1954 he was the Consul General, deputy head of the Political Department of the Ministry of Foreign Affairs, 1955–1957, Chargé d'affaires at Budapest 1957–1960 and Ambassador in Budapest since 1960.
