= Palokkajärvi =

Lake in Jyväskylä

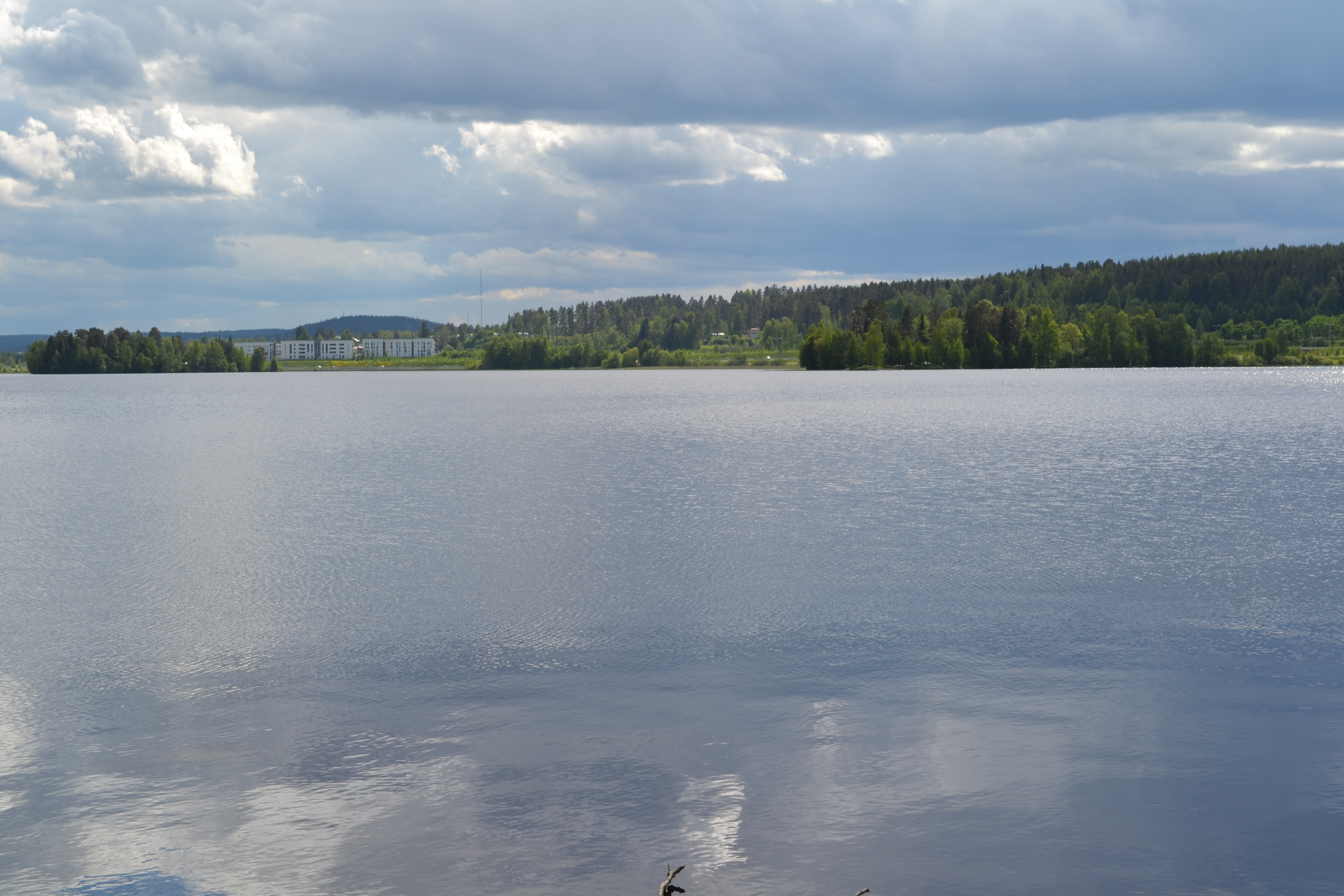
- Palokkajärvi seen from Palokka, with Mannila on the other side
- Interactive map of Palokkajärvi
- Location: Jyväskylä
- Coordinates: 62.275°N 25.740°E
- Primary outflows: Tourujoki
- Basin countries: Finland
- Surface area: 253.68 ha (626.9 acres)
- Average depth: 2.8 m (9.2 ft)
- Max. depth: 10.1 m (33 ft)
- Shore length^{1}: 12.4 km (7.7 mi)
- Surface elevation: 94.4 m (310 ft)
- Islands: 1
- ^{1} Shore length is not a well-defined measure.

Palokkajärvi (Finnish pronunciation: [ˈpɑ̝lo̞kːɑ̝ˌjærʋi]) is a lake in Jyväskylä, Finland, covering an area of 253.68 hectares (626.9 acres). The lake is mostly open in shape, with the exception of the Tyyppälänlahti bay in its eastern part extending towards Seppälänkangas. There is also a single island called Palosaari in its mid-western part.

Palokkajärvi is surrounded by urban area, including the districts of Palokka in the north and Lohikoski in the south. The district of Mannila is located to its west, however, its buildings are separated from the lake by the national road 4, the longest highway in the country.

== Etymology ==
The names of Palokkajärvi and Palokka are clearly connected, but whether the settlement was named after the lake or vice versa is unclear. In either case, the name is taken to refer to slash-and-burn agriculture (cf. palaa "to burn"), and may have been given either by early settlers or hunters preceding permanent settlement in the area. Palokka was first mentioned as a village in 1557, (Note: Spelled as Palocka. The first mention of the place name is from 1554, as paläcka äremarch.) having been separated from the village of Jyväsjoki, later Jyväskylä.

== Geography ==
Palokkajärvi has an average depth of 2.8 metres (9.2 ft) and a maximum depth of 10.1 metres (33 ft). The deepest part of the lake is located in the Tyyppälänlahti bay.

Three rivers discharge into the Palokkajärvi: Pappilanjoki from Alvajärvi in the north, Löylyjoki from Tuomiojärvi in the west and Karjujoki from Tyyppälänjärvi through Heinälampi in the east. The levels of Palokkajärvi, Alvajärvi and Tuomiojärvi are nearly the same at approximately 94.4 m (310 ft), while Tyyppälänjärvi is smaller and located further away from these three, having an elevation of 105.7 m (347 ft).

The outflow of Palokkajärvi is the 2.7-kilometre (1.7 mi) river Tourujoki, which discharges into the Jyväsjärvi. It has an average flow rate of 3.1 m^{3}/s (110 cu ft/s) and an average maximum flow rate of 11 m^{3}/s (390 cu ft/s). Both the flow rate and the lake's level is regulated by a dam at a hydroelectric power plant on the river's upper course. The plant is also allowed to regulate the level of Tuomiojärvi, Alvajärvi and Korttajärvi. Palokkajärvi is the lowest lake of the Tuomiojärvi-Palokkajärvi catchment area, itself part of the Kymijoki main basin and its subordinate Päijänne catchment area.

== Water quality ==
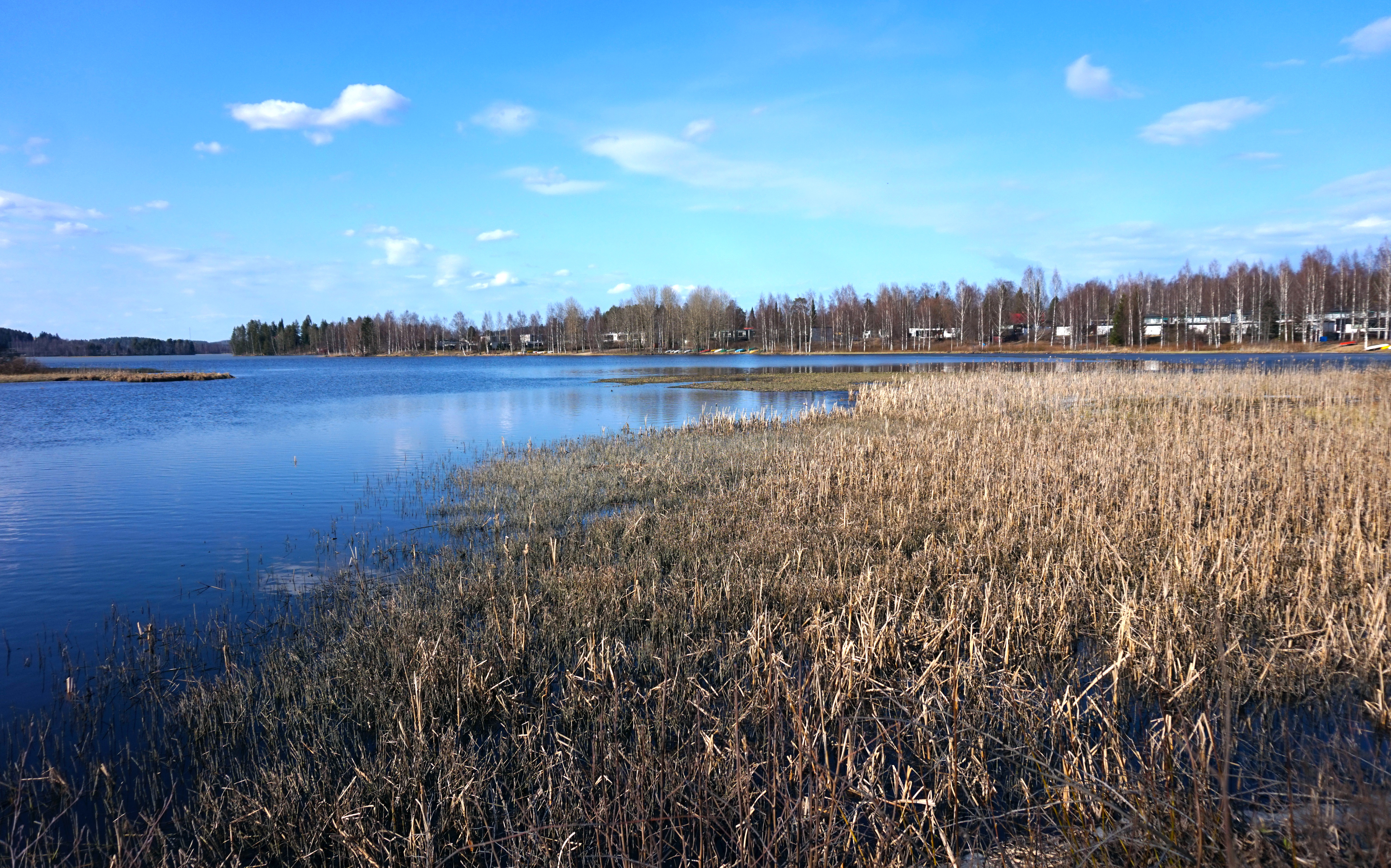
View towards Lohikoski

Until the late 1970s, wastewater from Tikkakoski was directed into the river Autiojoki, causing phosphorus levels to rise further down the watercourse, including Palokkajärvi. After wastewater began to be directed to the water treatment plant in Nenäinniemi, the phosphorus level of the lake began to drop, decreasing from a peak of nearly 90 μg/l in 1977 to slightly above 20 μg/l in 2015. However, Palokkajärvi remains more eutrophic when compared to Tuomiojärvi.

== Fishing ==
Recreational and subsistence fishing are practiced on the lake using rods, nets and traps. Fish found in the lake include pike, zander, perch, common bream, roach, burbot, common whitefish, ruffe and crucian carp. Zander are introduced into Palokkajärvi and Alvajärvi, a total of 13,100 juvenile fish were introduced between 2012 and 2015. The rainbow trout has also been introduced.
