= Jukka M. Heikkilä =

Finnish author (born 1966)

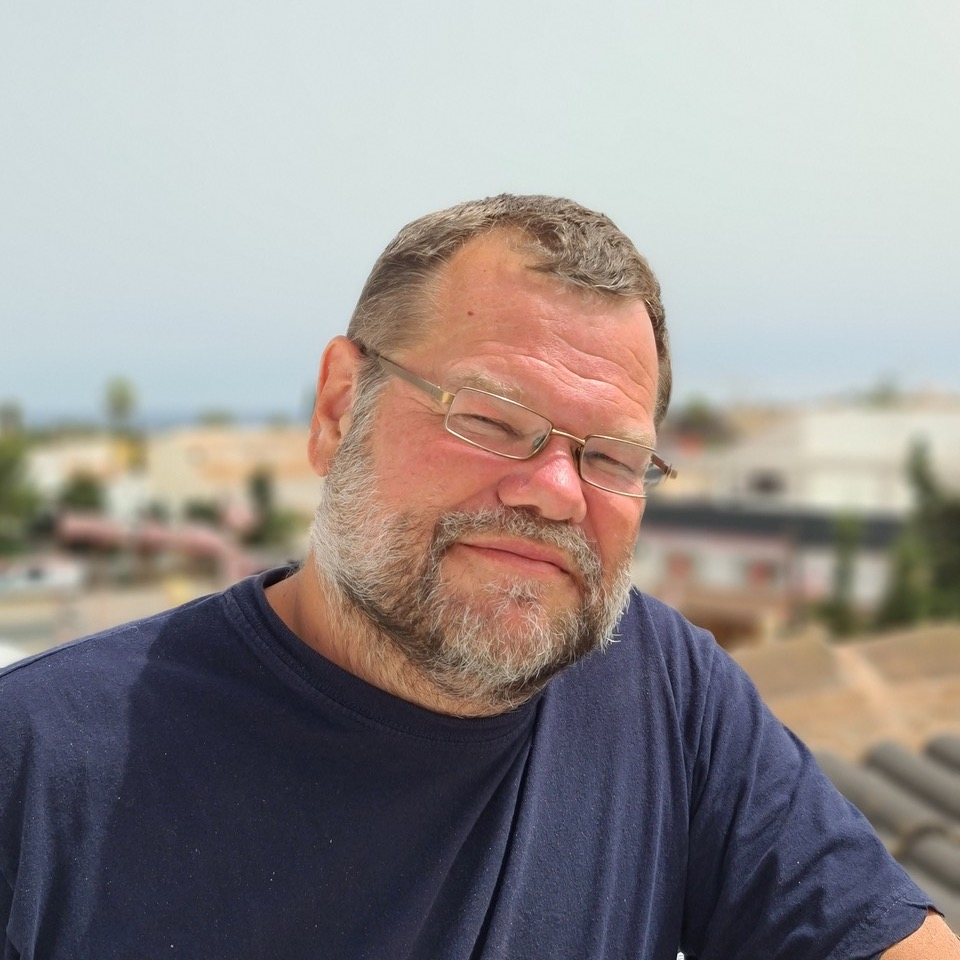
Jukka M. Heikkilä

Jukka M. Heikkilä (born 1966) is a Finnish author. He writes historical fiction set in the ancient world.

== Published works ==
- Sisilian prinsessa - 310–240 BC
- Antigonos, jumalten poika - 302–294 BC
- Arkhimedes syrakusalainen - 270 BC
- Karthago - 256–255 BC
- Merikonsuli - 245–241 BC
- Tyranni - 215–212 BC
- Augustuksen kisat - 2 BC
- Germania - AD 20
- Puumiekka - AD 91–92
- Germaani ja leijona - AD 106–107
- Juppiterin saari - AD 170

== About his works ==
- Merikonsuli (The Marine Consul) tells about the Roman Republic and naval warfare. The main character of the book is Gaius Lutatius Catulus, a Roman novus homo. Important characters include Hiero II of Syracuse, Archimedes, Hamilcar Barca and Hannibal.
- Tyranni tells about the power struggle in Syracuse and the subsequent siege The main character of the book is Epicydes, the city's tyrant. Important characters include Hannibal and Archimedes.
- Antigonos, jumalten poika tells about the Wars of the Diadochi and ethical philosophy. The main character of the book is young Antigonus II Gonatas, who later became the king of Macedon. Important characters include Antigonus I Monophthalmus, Demetrius I of Macedon, Pyrrhus of Epirus, Ptolemy I Soter, Zeno of Citium, Epicurus and Euclid.
- Arkhimedes syrakusalainen tells about mathematics and Egypt in Hellenistic times. The main character of the book is young Archimedes, a Syracusan mathematician. Important characters include Hiero II of Syracuse, Euclid and Ptolemy II Philadelphus.
- Augustuksen kisat tells about the gladiators and early Roman Empire. The key event is the naumachia of 2 BC. The main character is fictitious, but the important characters include Augustus, Livia and Julia.
- Germania is an adventure story set in a historical context. It is a story of a Roman expedition force on the Elbe river. The main character is fictitious, but the important characters include Germanicus, and Tiberius.
- Karthago tells about Carthage in the First Punic War. The main character of the books is Xanthippus of Carthage. Important characters include Hamilcar Barca and Marcus Atilius Regulus.
- Germaani ja leijona tells about venatio, animal fights staged in the arena. The main characters (The German Ramnulf and the lion Leo) are fictitious, but emperor Trajan and heir apparent Hadrian are important side characters.
- Juppiterin saari is an adventure story about a rescue mission to solve the mystery of odd news from the island Mons Jovis (Montecristo).
- Sisilian prinsessa tells about a Hellenistic queen who was worshipped as a god. The main character is Lanassas the daughter of Agathocles and wife of Pyrrhus of Epirus. Important characters include Agathocles, Pyrrhus, Demetrius I of Macedon and Antigonus II Gonatas.
- Puumiekka tells about gladiatrix performances, women in the arena. The main characters are fictitious. Emperor Domitian is a side character. The book describes Emperor Domitian's time of terror and gives a dark picture of absolute power.
