= Palokka =

- District of Jyväskylä
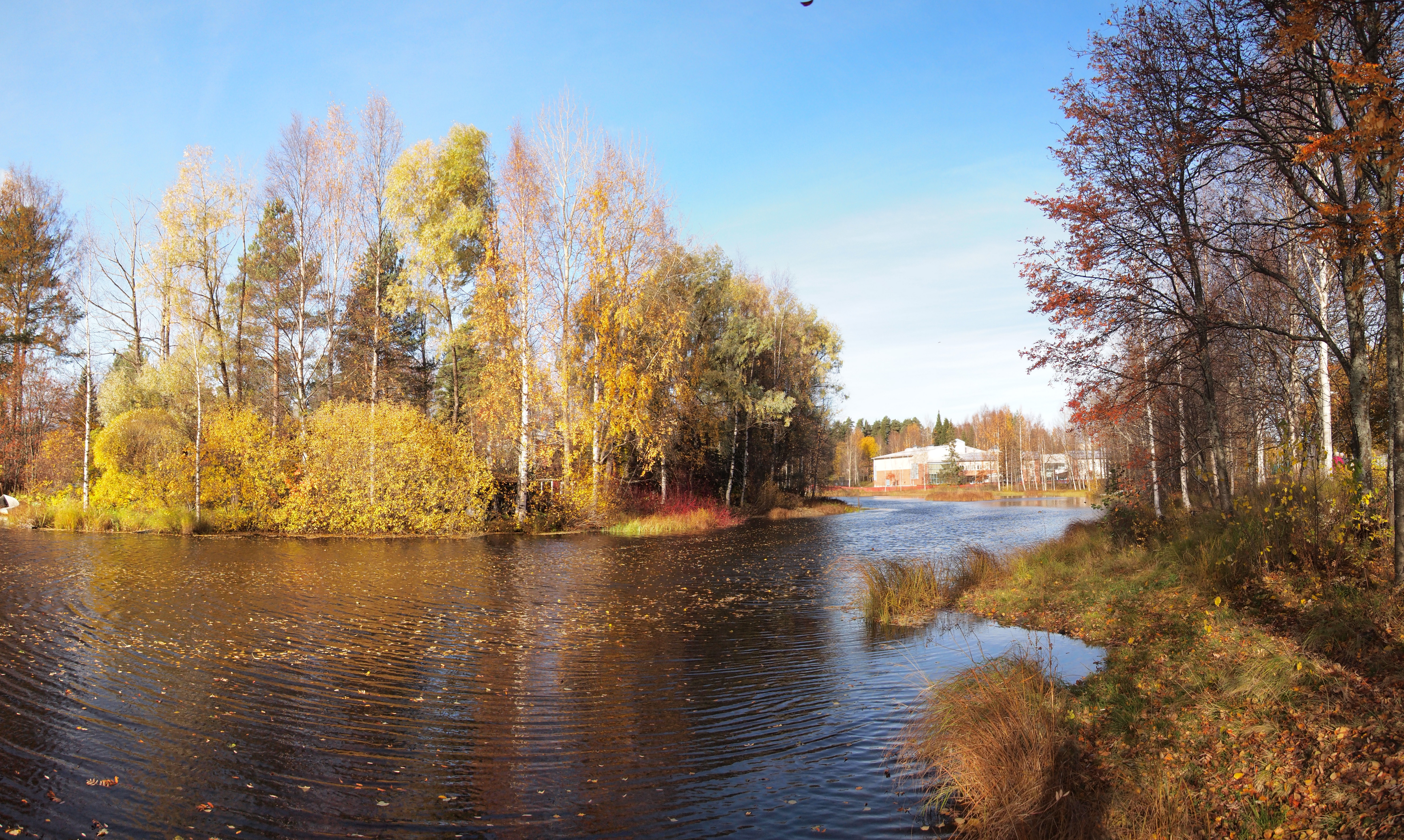
- The river Pappilanjoki. The building in the background is the Jokela school.

- Location in Central Finland
- Coordinates: 62.2894492°N 25.7368016°E
- Country: Finland
- Region: Central Finland
- Sub-region: Jyväskylä sub-region
- City: Jyväskylä
- Ward: Palokka-Puuppola
- Time zone: UTC+2 (EET)
  - Summer (DST): UTC+3 (EEST)
- Website: palokka.fi

Palokka is a district of Jyväskylä and the largest area by population in the Palokka-Puuppola ward. Until 31 December 2008, it was a part of Jyväskylän maalaiskunta. The greater Palokka area has a population of ~14000. Palokka is approximately 5 km to the north of central Jyväskylä.

The national road 4 goes through Palokka. Palokka is one of the fastest-growing parts of Jyväskylä.

== Geography ==
=== Residential areas ===
Officially, Palokka includes the following residential areas:

- Ritoniemi
- Ritopohja
- Ritoniitty
- Heinämäki
- Pappilanrinne
- Pappilanvuori
- Jokela
- Piilola
- Ollila
- Heikkilä
- Hiekkapohja
- Rippalanmäki
- Korppumäki
- Nuutti
- Haukkamäki
- Eerola
- Kirri
- Lintukangas
- Saarenmaa

The exact borders of Palokka are not well-defined. More commonly Palokka refers to the urbanized area and does not include the settlements on its outskirts, such as Saarenmaa.

=== Lakes ===
Palokka is located by the Alvajärvi and Palokkajärvi. The river Pappilanjoki connects the two lakes. The river Karjujoki connects Tyyppälänjärvi to Palokkajärvi.

== History ==
=== Name ===
The name Palokka refers to slash-and-burn agriculture (palaa = to burn). Similar toponyms exist elsewhere in Finland, including Palokka in both Nurmes and Haapavesi, however Palokka in Jyväskylä is the only one which refers to a settlement.

=== Initial settlement ===
The first houses in the area were established somewhere between the late 15th and early 16th centuries. The first permanent settlers of the area were Tavastian people: in 1539, Heikki Juhonpoika from Uittamo (in the parish of Saarioinen) and Perttu Nuutinpoika from Kankaroinen (in the parish of Sääksmäki) were mentioned as owners of hunting grounds in the area, later settling in the area permanently. Later settlers in the area were mostly Savonians.

Palokka was first mentioned in 1554 as Paläcka äremarch. Administratively Palokka and Jyväskylä were parts of Saarioinen, but ecclesiastically altering between Jämsä or, since 1561, Rautalampi and its chapel community of Laukaa.

Another early mention of Palokka is from 1583, as Pietari Puupponen and his sons from the nearby village of Puuppola raided Palokka and forged an ownership document for pieces of land near the Alvajärvi used as pastures by the people of Palokka and Jyväskylä. John III, king of Sweden, gave a sentence to Pietari, who had to give the pastures back to Palokka and Jyväskylä.

As Laukaa became an independent parish in 1627, Palokka and the other villages of the Jyväskylä area were transferred to it, which became permanent in 1646. The Jyväskylä chapel community, established in 1676, included Palokka and most other villages of modern Jyväskylä (Jyväskylä, Keljo, Haapaniemi, Puuppola, Vehniä, Vesanka, Tikkamannila and Nyrölä). Palokka was still officially a part of the Saarioinen division until an administrative reform in 1690.

Palokka was fairly small until the late 18th and early 19th centuries, when new farms were established due to the great partition, among them Hytölä, Ollila and Koskela.

=== Jyväskylä ===
Jyväskylän maalaiskunta was established in 1868. At first, it shared a parish with the town of Jyväskylä, but the two were split in 1880.

After the Continuation War, people from the ceded Sortavalan maalaiskunta (a municipality surrounding the town of Sortavala, now a part of Russia) were relocated to Central Finland, some of them to Palokka. Palokka started developing into an urban-type area because Jyväskylä started growing after the wars. Palokka was zoned in the 1970s. In the 1990s, Palokka became a commercial center as new businesses were opened in Keski-Palokka and Kirri.

Palokka got its own church in 1978, designed by the architect Antti Eskelinen. An expansion in 1999 was designed by Jorma Teppo.

Palokka was still a separate built-up area (taajama) as late as 1980 but later it had been absorbed into the Jyväskylä built-up area. As Jyväskylän maalaiskunta was merged into the town of Jyväskylä on 1 January 2009, Palokka became one of its districts.

== Services ==
=== Commercial ===
The Palokankeskus area by the national road 4 is a commercial center with two large general stores and a shopping center. The Kirri area has businesses such as flea markets.

=== Education ===
Grades 1-6 attend the Jokela school and the Keski-Palokka school while grades 7-9 attend the Palokka school, which also has a public library in the same building.

Saarenmaa used to have its own school until 2020.
