= Alvajärvi (Jyväskylä) =

Lake in Jyväskylä

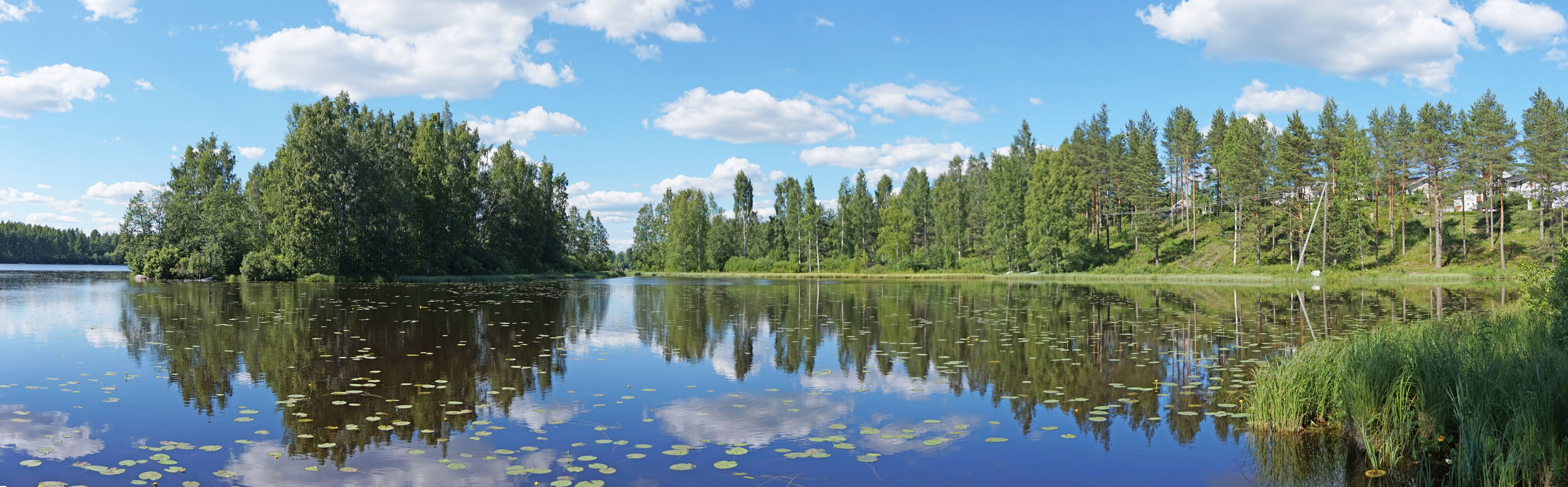
- Southern end of Alvajärvi
- Interactive map of Alvajärvi
- Location: Jyväskylä
- Coordinates: 62.314°N 25.720°E
- Primary outflows: Pappilanjoki
- Basin countries: Finland
- Max. length: 4 km (2.5 mi)
- Surface area: 211 ha (520 acres)
- Average depth: 3.8 m (12 ft)
- Max. depth: 16.5 m (54 ft)
- Water volume: 7.1 million cubic meters (250×10^{6} cu ft)
- Residence time: 30 days
- Shore length^{1}: 13.6 km (8.5 mi)
- Surface elevation: 94.9 m (311 ft)
- Islands: 4
- ^{1} Shore length is not a well-defined measure.

Alvajärvi (Note: Finnish pronunciation: [ˈɑ̝lʋɑ̝ˌjærʋi]) is a lake in Jyväskylä, Finland, covering an area of 211 hectares (520 acres). It lies between the urban area of Palokka in the south and the village of Puuppola in the north. The lake's outflow is the river Pappilanjoki, which flows into lake Palokkajärvi.

== Etymology ==
The name of Alvajärvi was first attested in 1554 as Alueierffuij. Based on older forms beginning with Alve- instead of Alva-, linguist Viljo Nissilä has compared the name to the words alve meaning fish tapeworm and alvejuuri referring to a species of fern (Note: Specifically, Dryopteris and Polypodium sp., of which especially Dryopteris filix-mas, called kivikkoalvejuuri in standard Finnish, has been used in folk medicine.) that has traditionally been used to treat intestinal worms. Alvajärvi shares its name with another lake and a village on its northern shore, located in Pihtipudas in northern Central Finland.

== Geography ==
=== General ===
Alvajärvi is about 4 kilometers (2.5 mi) long and covers an area of 211 hectares (520 acres). It is located in the northern part of Jyväskylä, between the urban area of Palokka and the village of Puuppola. Residential areas by the lake include Kirri, Piilola, Ollila and Heikkilä in the south as well as Matinmäki and Perä-Palokka in the north. The Finnish national road 4 runs near the lake's western shore. There are four islands in the lake, three of which are small islets in its northern part. The biggest island in the lake is called Lammassaari.

Alvajärvi has a volume of 7.1 million cubic meters (250×10^{6} cu ft), its average depth is 3.8 meters (12 ft) and the maximum depth is 16.5 meters (54 ft). The deepest point lies in the middle of the lake, west of the Pilliniemi cape.

=== Basin ===
Alvajärvi is part of the Kymijoki main catchment area and its subordinate Päijänne basin. The lake's own catchment area covers an area of 256 square kilometers (99 sq mi). The main inflow of Alvajärvi is the river Laahajoki, which begins from Korttajärvi, drains a basin of 236 square kilometers (91 sq mi) and discharges into the northern end of the lake. Another inflow, discharging into the lake's eastern part, is the Karhupuro, with a basin covering an area of 9.54 square kilometers (3.68 sq mi). Due to the long and narrow shape of the lake, it retains water for quite long. The lake retention time of Alvajärvi is estimated to be 30 days.

Alvajärvi itself discharges into lake Palokkajärvi via the 947-meter (3,107 ft) river Pappilanjoki. Both lakes have approximately the same surface level at 94.8 meters (311 ft) above sea level. The levels of both Alvajärvi and Palokkajärvi, as well as those of Korttajärvi and Tuomiojärvi, are regulated by a dam in the river Tourujoki, the outflow of Palokkajärvi.

== Environmental values ==
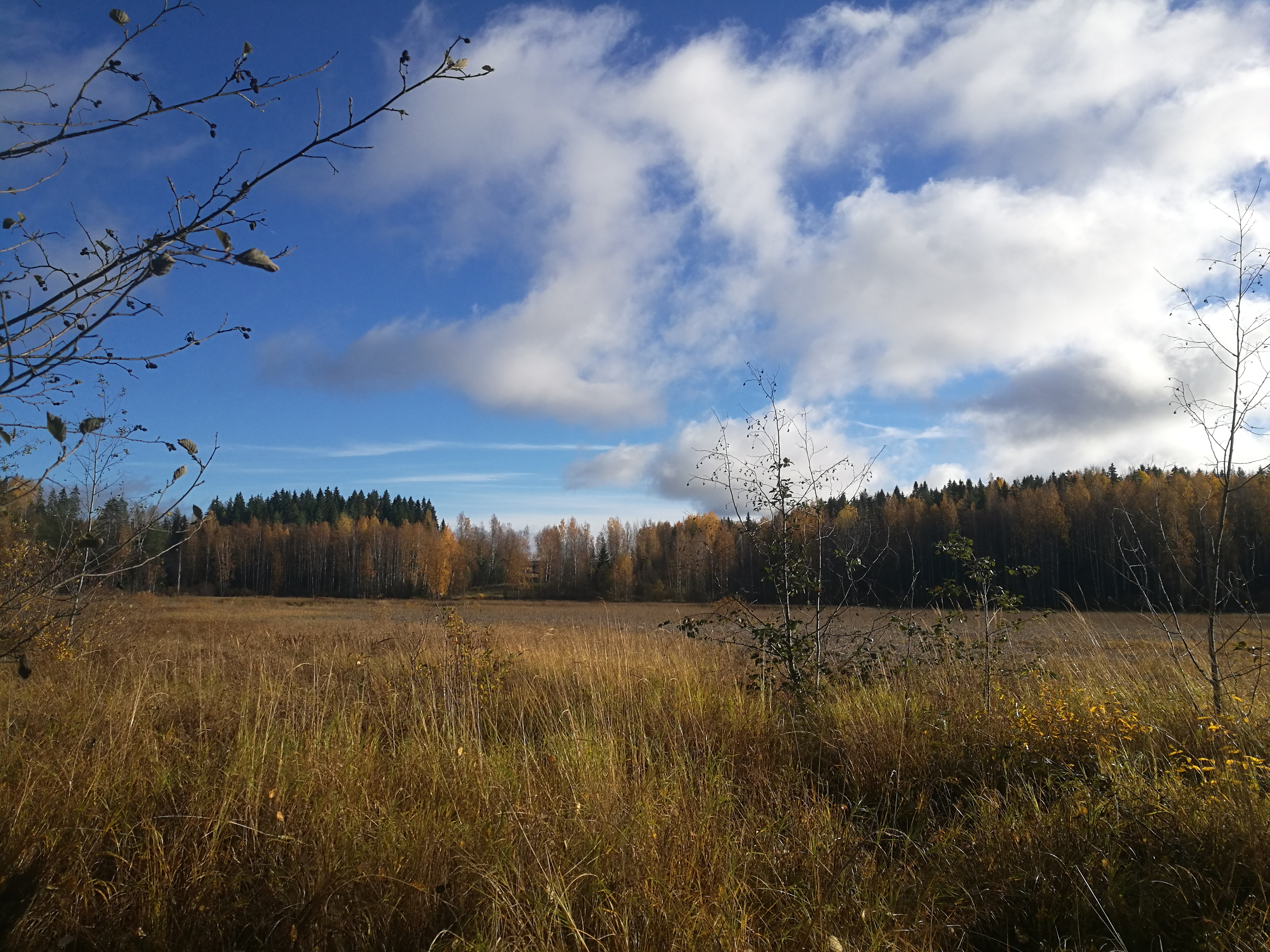
Northern part of Alvajärvi in October 2025

=== Water quality ===
According to measurements from 2021, based on samples taken from a meter below surface level, the water of the lake had a pH of 7, a nitrogen level of 740 μg/l (4.3×10^{−7} oz/cu in), a phosphorus level of 29 μg/l (1.7×10^{−8} oz/cu in) and a turbidity level of 4,8 FNU. Alvajärvi and Palokkajärvi are very similar in terms of water quality, though the former has slightly darker water and a slightly higher chemical oxygen demand due to runoffs from agriculture. Approximately half of all phosphorus loading in Alvajärvi originates from agriculture, with the highest amount coming from the Makkarajoki basin.

Until the 1970s, wastewater from Tikkakoski was discharged into the river Autiojoki flowing into Korttajärvi, resulting in nutrient loading in both lakes. While phosphorus and chlorophyll levels have decreased since then, the lower layers of both lakes are still occasionally lacking in oxygen, especially in late summer.

=== Flora and fauna ===
Based on data collected in 2010, fish found in the lake include perch, pike, ruffe, European bullhead, zander, smelt, common bream, burbot, white bream, bleak, common rudd, roach and crucian carp. The European river lamprey has also been encountered. In 2009, there were 106 households who had fished on the lake using rods, nets and traps. The total amount of fish caught was 1,708 kilograms (3,765 lb), equivalent to 8.5 kg/ha (7.6 lb/acre) in one year. The most common catches were pike (caught by 25% of fishers), common bream (23%), perch (22%) and zander (22%). Zander have also been stocked into Alvajärvi, with 12,000 juvenile fish introduced between 2012 and 2015.

The shallow northern bay of Alvajärvi is a locally significant resting place for migratory waterbirds, as ice in the bay begins to melt earlier in the spring than in other parts of the lake due to the Laahajoki discharging there. In the summer, the bay is covered by horsetails and other aquatic plants. Nesting bird species include black-headed gulls and little gulls. Colonies of black-headed gulls and common gulls are also found on and around Lammassaari.
