= Saarenmaa =

- District of Jyväskylä
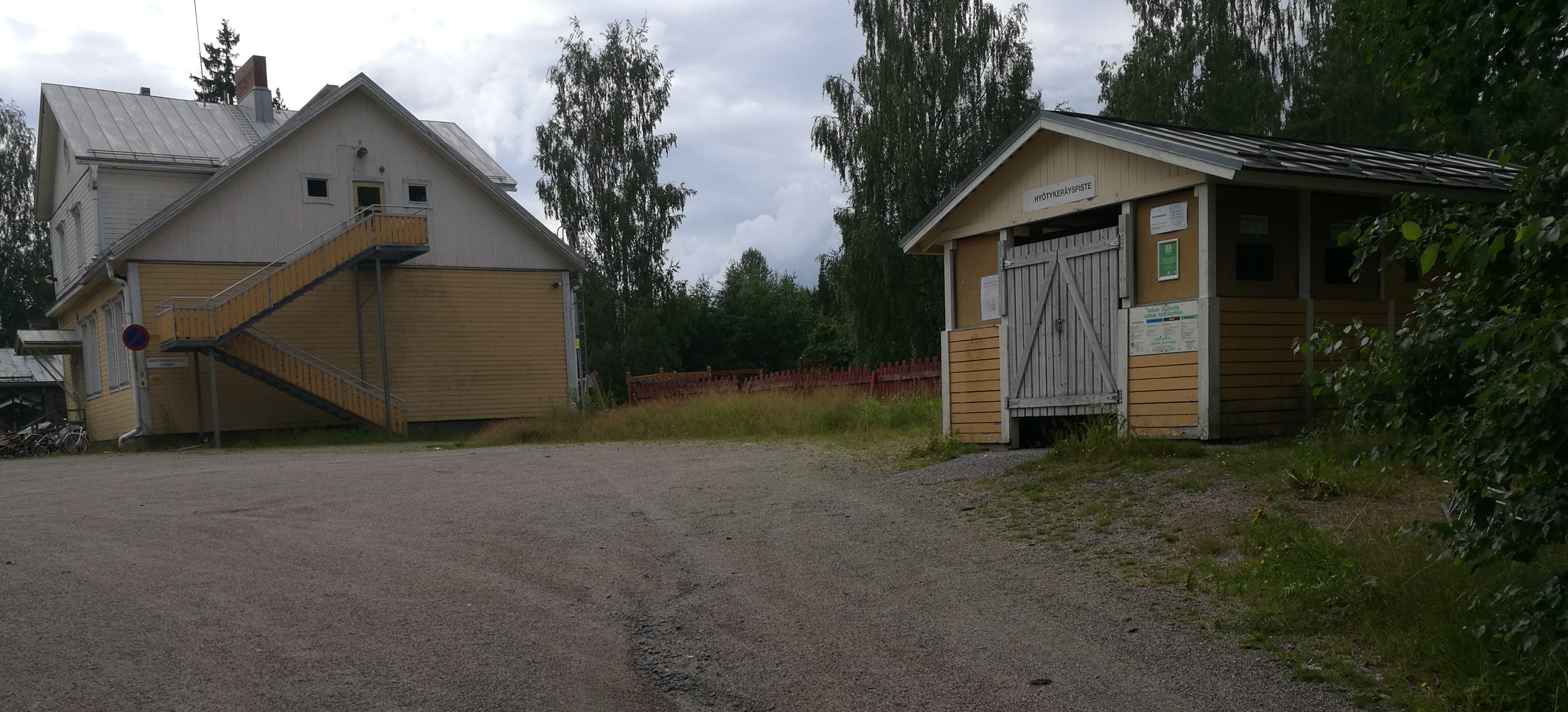
- Former school of Saarenmaa

- Location in Central Finland
- Coordinates: 62°18′40.76″N 25°36′35.57″E
- Country: Finland
- Region: Central Finland
- Sub-region: Jyväskylä sub-region
- City: Jyväskylä
- Ward: Palokka-Puuppola

Population (December 2010)
  - Total: 731 (including Vertaala)
- Time zone: UTC+2 (EET)
  - Summer (DST): UTC+3 (EEST)
- Postal code: 40270 PALOKKA

Saarenmaa is a district of Jyväskylä, Finland. It is a semi-rural area that may be seen as a separate village. Saarenmaa is also a statistical area which includes the nearby settlement of Vertaala.

The road 16687 (Saarenmaantie) connects Saarenmaa to Palokka and Jyväskylä proper.

== Geography ==
=== Boundaries ===
The district (kaupunginosa, for local development) is smaller than the statistical area (tilastoalue) of Saarenmaa: the district only includes the Reijunperä area between and around the lakes Ylä-Tuomiojärvi and Kaitajärvi. Parts of statistical Saarenmaa also fall under the districts of Varsalanperä and Puuppola, while Vertaala is a separate district.

== History ==
Saarenmaa is located on the border area of the register villages (rekisterikylä) of Vesanka, Korttajärvi (Puuppola) and Palokka. The eponymous farm of Saarenmaa was officially located in the village of Vesanka and was established in 1837.

Saarenmaa was a part of Jyväskylän maalaiskunta until its disestablishment in 2009. Saarenmaa was soon designated as one of Jyväskylä's districts.

== Services ==
=== School ===
Saarenmaa used to have its own school providing education for grades 1–4. The school was closed in August 2020 due to poor indoor air quality, as renovating the school would have been too expensive. The 41 students of the school were assigned to the new school in Savulahti.
