= Pengerjoki (village) =

- Village
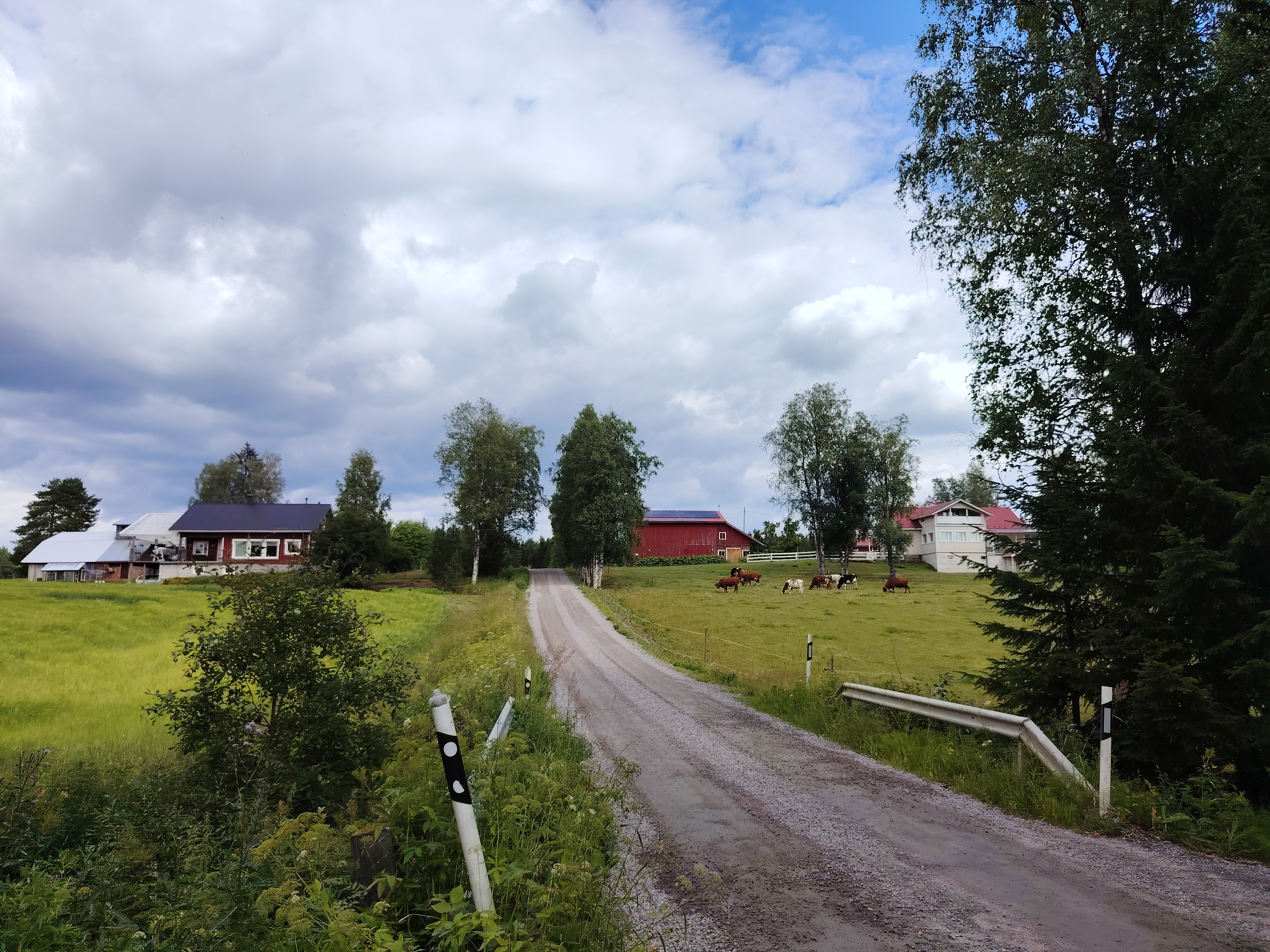
- The Karjokoski farm along the road Kuitulantie

- Location in Central Finland
- Coordinates: 62.313°N 25.112°E
- Country: Finland
- Region: Central Finland
- Sub-region: Jyväskylä sub-region
- Municipality: Petäjävesi
- Time zone: UTC+2 (EET)
  - Summer (DST): UTC+3 (EEST)

Pengerjoki is a village in Petäjävesi, Finland, located in the western part of the municipality along the eponymous river and near the border with Keuruu and Multia. The Finnish national road 18 passes through the village.

Historically known as Rukoila, it is the oldest village in Petäjävesi; it was first mentioned in a land register from 1539, but may have already been settled in the 15th century. Until 1767, the village only comprised a single farm. From there, it continued to grow mainly with the establishment of tenant farms, which became independent after 1918, and later with the resettlement of Karelian refugees in 1945 following the Winter and Continuation Wars. The modern name Pengerjoki became more common in the 20th century.

== Geography ==
=== Location and boundaries ===
The village is located along the lower course of the river Pengerjoki, which flows into lake Jämsänvesi–Petäjävesi, and near the municipal border with Keuruu and Multia. The Finnish national road 18 passes through Pengerjoki, connecting it to the municipal center Petäjäveden kirkonkylä in the southeast. Modern Pengerjoki mainly corresponds to the land register village of Rukoila, but also includes parts of historical Kuivasmäki and Petäjävesi. On the other hand, the area of Kruununmaa near Kuitulanperä north of the village center is part of historical Rukoila, but is today more closely tied to Kuivasmäki. The name Rukoila was more common until the 20th century, when the modern name Pengerjoki began to displace it.

=== Nature ===
Syrjäharju esker

Pengerjoki is situated mainly within the basin of the eponymous river and its tributaries Merouvenjoki and Ohrajoki. The average elevation in the river valley is about 120–130 meters (390–430 ft), while the highest point of the village is Sulkukangas at about 210 meters (690 ft) above sea level. The biggest lake entirely within the village is Mommiojärvi with an area of some 17 hectares (42 acres). The lake Salosjärvi on the municipal border is bigger, but belongs mainly to Keuruu.

The village is located near the Syrjäharju esker, the highest point of which reaches an elevation of 150 meters (490 ft). The esker extends into Keuruu. While parts of it have been altered by gravel extraction, its center remains mostly natural. About 65 hectares (160 acres) of it is part of the Natura 2000 network, including old pine forest and springs. There are three trails in the area.

== History ==
Rukoila was first mentioned in the first land register of the Hämeenlinna slottslän from 1539, when it was part of Jämsä and comprised a single farm that was later known as Jänis or Mommio. Most farms in Jämsä mentioned in the land register were most likely established between the 14th and 15th centuries, when new settlements emerged throughout Finland. In the case of Rukoila, the first farm may have been established in the 15th century; in any case, Rukoila is the oldest village in Petäjävesi, the second oldest being Kintaus, which was settled in 1554. Rukoila had originally formed a jakokunta (land partition unit) with the villages of Haavisto and Tervala. By the 18th century, it formed one with Kuivasmäki instead. Rukoila comprised a single farm until 1767, when the Murtola farm was split from it, followed by a second Jänis (later Niiles) in 1772. In 1775, the Salos farm was established on the shore of lake Salosjärvi, but in 1784, its owner abandoned it and established the Saari farm in the northern part of Rukoila near the river Lihajoki, leaving Salos uninhabited until 1801.

The first four tenant farms in Rukoila were established between 1792 and 1794; while all of them had been abandoned by the 1820s, new ones were established in their place. By 1860, there were nine tenant farms in Rukoila. In the 19th century, tenant farms were also established near the river outside the borders of Rukoila; some on the lands of Kuivasmäki (including farms in modern Töysänperä) as well as some on the lands of Kirri and the Tähtiniemi vicarage in the village of Petäjävesi. The Great Partition was carried out in Rukoila and Kuivasmäki in 1816. About 807 hectares (1,990 acres) of the former's lands became state-owned (hence the name Kruununmaa, 'crown land'), remaining so until the 1920s. Only two new independent farms were established before the 20th century: Karjokoski in 1857 and Syrjälä in 1891. The municipality of Petäjävesi was separated from Jämsä in 1867.

Some industry also emerged along the river Pengerjoki in the 19th century. In 1841, Carl Henrik John received permission to build an iron furnace accompanied by two trip hammers using local bog iron along the Pengerkoski rapids. John had previously rented the Högfors ironworks in Karkkila, as well as the Karikkokoski sawmill in Petäjävesi. Despite his prior experience, the furnace was not profitable, only producing 30 kippunta of wrought iron in 1845, and the facility burned down in 1847. A small tar and turpentine factory was later established on its site by K. O. Holm around 1862, but was closed in 1866, when the owner moved to Saarijärvi. Log driving along the river began around 1870, with wood being driven all the way from its headwaters in the village of Sahrajärvi to lake Jämsänvesi, continuing until the mid-1950s.

The land register village of Rukoila comprised seven independent farms, 23 tenant farms and three smaller houses with no fields (mäkitupa) in 1900. In 1918, a law was passed allowing tenant farmers to redeem their farms for themselves, and by 1920, the number of independent farms had increased to 29. The village grew further after the Winter and Continuation Wars, when Karelian refugees were settled there. 20 new farms were established in Pengerjoki in 1945, mainly on lands owned by the forestry company G. A. Serlachius Oy. The village developed rapidly afterwards: a school and a store were opened and roads were improved. The highway to Multia was finished in 1952, while electric and telephone lines were installed in 1953. Electricity had also been produced locally at a hydroelectric plant on the Pengerkoski rapids since 1917, continuing until the 1980s.

== Services ==
The Pengerjoki school was established in 1947 after the population of the village had increased due to the resettlement of Karelian refugees. Until then, children from the village variously went to school in central Petäjävesi, Kuivasmäki or Kuitula. Classes were initially held at the Murtola farm; the site of the school building was not agreed upon until 1954. The building was finished in 1955. After the population of the village began to decline in the 1950s, the school was eventually closed in 1971. The school building was then used as a wood workshop by the handicraft school of Petäjävesi until 1977, after which it was converted into a residence.

The area around the Salos farm, closely tied to the village of Huttula in Keuruu, was supposed to become its own school district already in 1900, but a school was never established there. In 1912, the municipality of Keuruu suggested the establishment of a shared school district including parts of both municipalities, resulting in the establishment of a school in Huttula. The Huttula school was closed in 1961.

== Notable buildings ==
The Jänis farm, the oldest farm in Petäjävesi, is classified as a regionally significant built environment. It lies on a hill near the lake Mommiojärvi and its current main building dates to 1882. It also includes a set of granaries from the early 20th century and a log sauna from 1937.
