= Pengerjoki (river) =

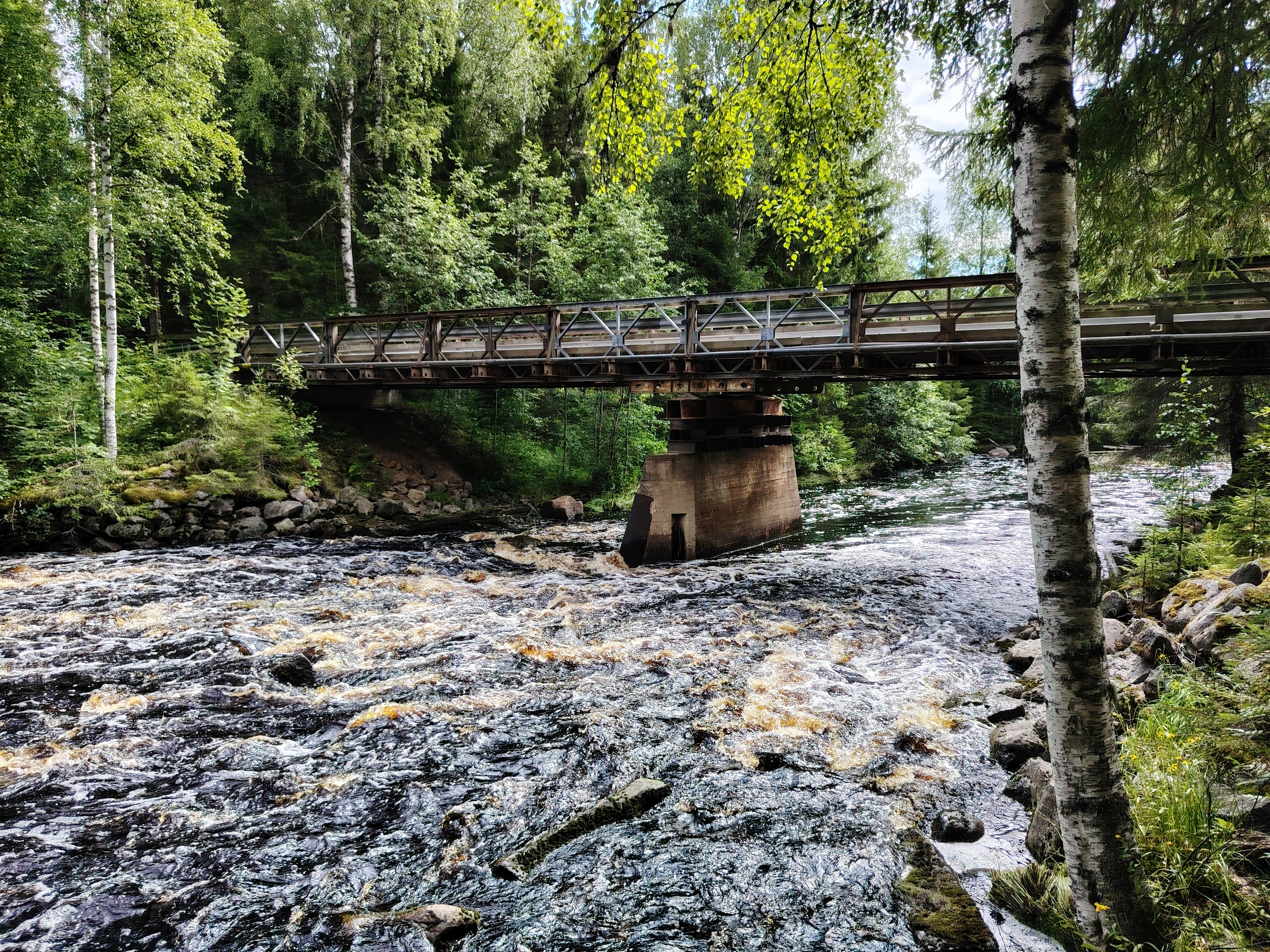
- The Pengerkoski rapids on the river's lower course

Location
- Country: Finland
- Region: Central Finland
- Municipality: Multia, Petäjävesi

Physical characteristics
- Source
  - coordinates: 62.4628°N 24.9941°E
  - elevation: 187 m (614 ft)
- Mouth: Jämsänvesi–Petäjävesi
  - coordinates: 62.2744°N 25.1387°E
  - elevation: 111 m (364 ft)
- Length: 35.9 km (22.3 mi)
- Basin size: 408 km^{2} (158 sq mi)

Basin features
- River system: Kymijoki
- Tributaries
  - left: Haarapuro, Ohrajoki, Merouvenjoki
  - right: Vekurinjoki, Kulhanjoki

The Pengerjoki is a 36-kilometer (22 mi) river in the Finnish region of Central Finland, beginning in Multia and flowing into lake Jämsänvesi in Petäjävesi. It drains an area of about 408 square kilometers (158 sq mi). Pengerjoki is also the name of a village along the river.

== Geography ==
=== Course ===
The Pengerjoki begins at the confluence of the Hiukkajoki and Rajajoki rivers at an elevation of 187 meters (614 ft) above sea level, near the village of Peurala in Multia. The river first flows southeast, but turns to the southwest after being crossed by the highway 627, turning again to the southeast between the Lehmikoski and Kolmihaarankoski rapids. They are followed by the Matinkoski rapids, after which the river begins to meander, and the tributary Haarapuro, beginning from lake Haarajärvi to the east, joins it in an eastward bend. The next major tributary is the Vekurinjoki, beginning from lake Vekurinlampi to the west. After this confluence and the Nimetönkoski rapids, the municipal border between Multia and Petäjävesi follows the river until the tripoint with Keuruu, after which it flows entirely within Petäjävesi. The river Kulhanjoki, beginning in Keuruu at the confluence of the Hyyrynpuro and Myllypuro, joins the Pengerjoki slightly above this point.

In Petäjävesi, the river flows through a village also called Pengerjoki. The Ohrajoki joins it after the Pitkänrannanmutka bend, followed by the outlets of two small lakes, Mommiojärvi and Pieni-Hete, shortly after which the Finnish national road 18 crosses the river. After the Pengerkoski rapids, the lowest tributary, Merouvenjoki, joins the river about 533 meters (1,749 ft) before the mouth. The Pengerjoki finally flows into lake Jämsänvesi at a surface elevation of 111 meters (364 ft), giving it a total drop of 75 meters (246 ft). The total length of the river is 35.9 kilometers (22.3 mi).

=== Basin and tributaries ===
The Pengerjoki is part of the Kymijoki main catchment area and the Jämsänjoki watercourse. The river's own basin covers an area of 408 square kilometers (158 sq mi) (334.7 km^{2} [129.2 sq mi] without the lowest tributary Merouvenjoki). The tributary with the largest basin is Ohrajoki, covering 102.9 km^{2} (39.7 sq mi), followed by Merouvenjoki (73.7 km^{2} [28.5 sq mi]), Kulhanjoki (54.8 km^{2} [21.2 sq mi]), Vekurinjoki (22.8 km^{2} [8.8 sq mi]) and Haarapuro (10.9 km^{2} [4.2 sq mi]).

About 89% of the basin is covered by forest, while farmland makes up only 5% of its area and is mainly concentrated around the lower courses of the Pengerjoki, Ohrajoki and Merouvenjoki. 29% of the area is peatland (including forested/drained peatlands). Lakes make up about 3% of the basin's area.

=== Rapids ===
The river has many rapids, with those in Multia including Leppäkoski, Pitkäkoski, Peuralan Myllykoski, Lehmikoski, Kolmihaarankoski, Matinkoski, Vanhanmyllynkoski, Nimetönkoski, Katajakoski, a second Leppäkoski, Kalliokoski and Alakoski. Rapids in Petäjävesi include Riuttakoski, Karjokoski and Pengerkoski. Due to its many rapids, the Pengerjoki is a popular paddling route, especially during high water.

== Water quality ==
The Riuttakoski rapids at the municipal tripoint

Natural runoff is the main source of both nitrogen and phosphorus loading in the basin, respectively 77,740 kg (171,390 lb) and 1,799 kg (3,966 lb) per year. The next most significant sources are agricultural (14,120 kg [31,130 lb] N/year and 1,474 kg [3,250 lb] P/year) and forestry runoff (17,000 kg [37,000 lb] N/year and 1,082 kg [2,385 lb] P/year), the latter mainly from drained peatlands used for forestry. Peat production areas are the only identified pollution point sources.

Most peatlands in the basin have been drained, with those used for peat extraction covering a total area of 537 hectares (1,330 acres) as of 2023. Natural bogs include Lampuodinsuo and Sallistensuo. The company Neova extracts peat from three areas within the basin: Lapsukansuo on the upper course of the river in Multia, Palosuo-Kurkisuo on the border between Petäjävesi and Jyväskylä in the Merouvenjoki basin and Ukonmurronsuo on the border between Petäjävesi and Keuruu in the Kulhanjoki basin. There is also a private peat extraction area at the Haukisuo bog within the Rajajoki basin.

Naturally reproducing grayling and brown trout are found in the river, but both have also been stocked into it, last between 2010 and 2019. Naturally occurring European crayfish may still be found on the upper course. There is a dam on the Pengerkoski rapids, which does not completely block fish migration, but restricts it during low water.

== History ==
The upper Leppäkoski rapids by the Riekko mill in Multia

A short-lived iron furnace using local bog iron existed by the Pengerkoski rapids from 1841 until 1847, when it was destroyed in a fire. It was the first iron refinery in Petäjävesi; the more successful Koskensaari ironworks in Kintaus were established shortly after in 1850. In 1862, the site was bought by K. O. Holm, who operated a small tar and turpentine factory there until 1866. The remains of the furnace may have been destroyed in 1980, when two houses were built on its site.

The river had been used for log driving at least since the 1860s, reaching its peak between the 1930s and 1940s. After being driven through the Pengerkoski rapids, logs were tied together into rafts at the Pohjola farm. Some of the logs were then loaded onto trains, while others were transported further down the watercourse to Päijänne and as far as Kotka.

In 1917, the owner of the Pohjola farm Feliks Paulin established a hydroelectric plant by the Pengerkoski rapids, which was accompanied by a sawmill and a small watermill. The municipality of Petäjävesi began buying electricity from the plant in 1928, which was used in public buildings in Petäjäveden kirkonkylä. The plant was sold in 1948, by which time it provided electricity only to some nearby houses, continuing to do so until the 1980s. Smaller plants were also established along the Karjokoski and Riuttakoski rapids, and were only used to provide electricity to their owners. The Riekko farm along the upper Leppäkoski rapids in Multia also had its own sawmill and a watermill.

Fields along the river in the village of Pengerjoki were historically prone to flooding. The lower course was largely dredged in the early 1970s, while two weirs were built in 1981 to keep the water level in some sections higher during the summer.
