= Könkköjoki =

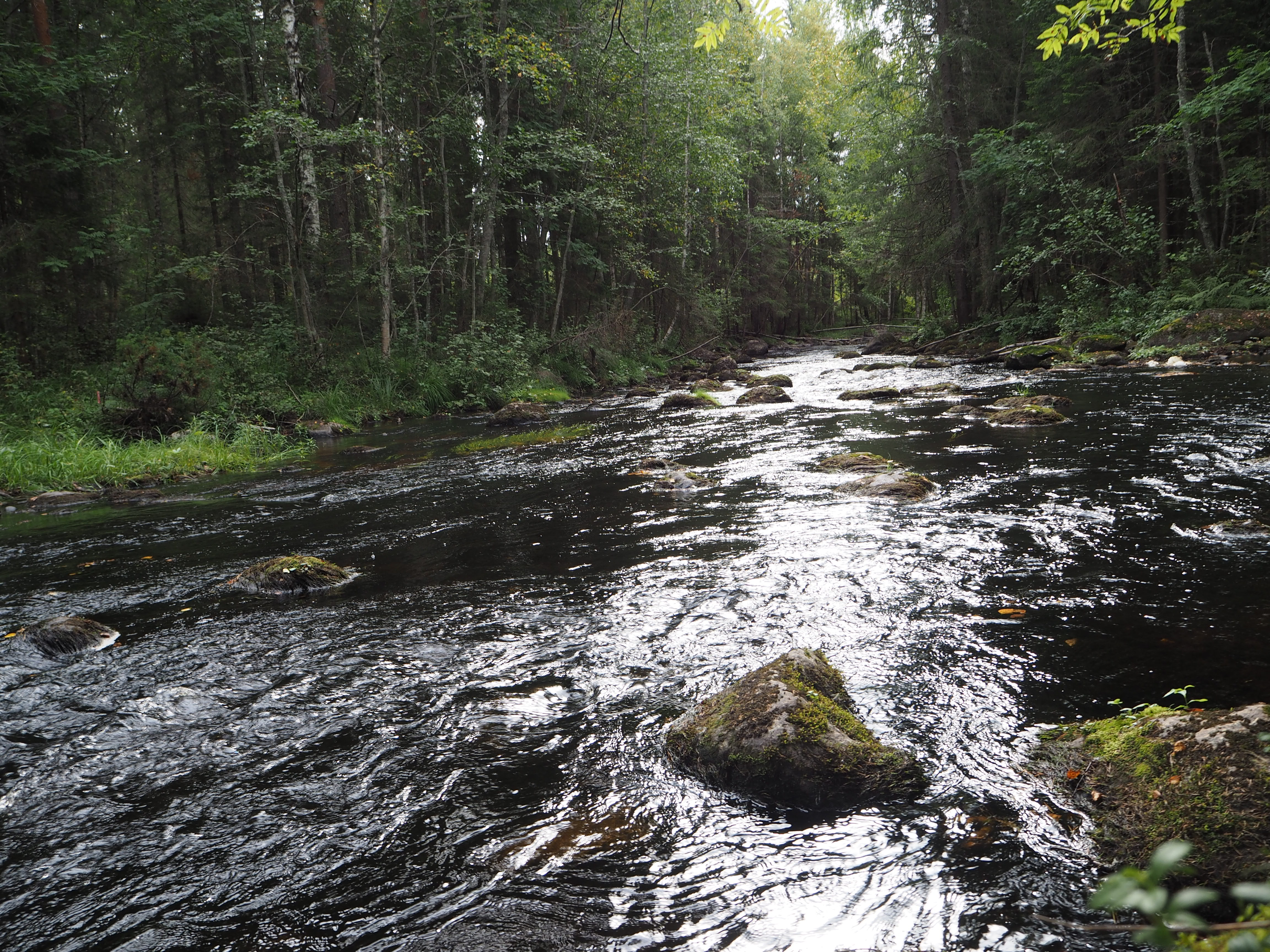

Location
- Country: Finland
- Region: Central Finland
- Municipality: Petäjävesi

Physical characteristics
- Source: Huhtia–Pyhäjärvi
  - coordinates: 62.2460°N 25.2697°E
  - elevation: 128 m (420 ft)
- Mouth: Jämsänvesi–Petäjävesi (Karikkoselkä)
  - coordinates: 62.2289°N 25.2519°E
  - elevation: 111 m (364 ft)
- Length: 3.1 km (1.9 mi)
- Basin size: 149.9 km^{2} (57.9 sq mi)
- Width
  - average: 4–5 m (13–16 ft)
- Discharge
  - average: 1.4 m^{3}/s (49 cu ft/s)

Basin features
- River system: Kymijoki

Könkköjoki is a 3.1-kilometer (1.9 mi) river in Petäjävesi, Finland that begins from lake Huhtia–Pyhäjärvi and flows into the Karikkoselkä basin of Jämsänvesi–Petäjävesi. It drains an area of about 150 square kilometers (58 sq mi).

The river has five rapids, which provide spawning grounds for brown trout. The Karikkokoski rapids were the site of the first sawmill in Petäjävesi, established in 1834.

== Geography ==
Könkköjoki begins at the southernmost bay of Huhtia at an elevation of 128 meters (420 ft) above sea level. It initially flows south in a wide section called Könkkö, but on the middle course, the channel becomes narrower and turns southwest. On the lower course, there are five rapids, from highest to lowest named Könkönkoski, Pitkäkoski, Karikkokoski, Myllykoski and Sahakoski; the last rapids are crossed by a bridge. The river ends at the entrance of the Petäälahti bay of Karikkoselkä at an elevation of 111 meters (364 ft), giving it a total drop of 17 meters (56 ft).

The total length of the river is 3.1 kilometers (1.9 mi), while its average width is 4–5 meters (13–16 ft). With the exception of a few small fields, the course is forested; the lower course is mostly fertile deciduous forest, while the upper course is dominated by spruces. Its average discharge is 1.4 m^{3}/s (49 cu ft/s).

Könkköjoki is part of the Kymijoki main catchment area and the Jämsänjoki basin within it. The river's own basin covers an area of 149.9 square kilometers (57.9 sq mi), of which 148 km^{2} (57 sq mi) make up the catchment area of Huhtia–Pyhäjärvi. The river itself has no notable tributaries. Major lakes within the basin include Ala-Kintaus and Ylä-Kintaus; the waters of the latter flow into the former, from where they continue into a smaller lake named Kipponen in the village of Kintaus before reaching Huhtia–Pyhäjärvi.

== Water quality ==
The overall ecological status of Könkköjoki, which is listed together with lake Kipponen and its outflow into Huhtia as a single site, is classified as good under the criteria of the WFD. More specifically, the biological quality of the water bodies is classified as high, the physical-chemical quality as good, and the hydromorphological quality as moderate.

Based on samples taken from the Sahakoski rapids between 1987 and 2009, the water of Könkköjoki had a pH between 5.9 and 6.7, a total nitrogen content of 380–580 μg/l (2.2×10^{−7}–3.4×10^{−7} oz/cu in), a total phosphorus content of 11–23 μg/l (6.4×10^{−9}–1.33×10^{−8} oz/cu in) and a color value of 70–130 mg Pt/l.

Könkköjoki is home to an introduced, but naturally reproducing population of brown trout. Based on measurements taken between 1996 and 2010, the average density of juvenile trout in the river's rapids is 13.6 individuals per 100 m^{2} (1,100 sq ft). The highest density, 31 per 100 m^{2}, was recorded in 2009, while the lowest, 3.7 per 100 m^{2}, was recorded in 1999. The river became the first catch and release site in the region in 2005. In 2009, gravel was added to the riverbed to improve spawning conditions. Other fish found in the river include perch, roach and grayling. There is also a significant population of the introduced signal crayfish.

Five uncommon species of caddisfly are known from Könkköjoki. White-throated dippers can be seen in the winter.

== History ==
In 1834, vice-pastor of Petäjävesi K. G. Strömborg was given permission to establish a sawmill and a watermill along the Karikkokoski rapids, both of which were soon bought by traders Israel Sucksdorff and Elias Unonius from Loviisa. The sawmill had two frame saws and acquired wood from Petäjävesi as well as some parts of Jyväskylä, Keuruu, Multia and Uurainen. It had a maximum production quota of 3,000 logs per year until 1861, when all such restrictions were lifted; production peaked in 1890, when 35,000 logs were processed. The Karikkokoski sawmill was the only sawmill in Petäjävesi until 1895, when a steam-powered sawmill was established near the Sipilä farm in Kuivasmäki. After the Haapamäki–Jyväskylä railway was opened for traffic soon afterwards, more competitors emerged in Petäjävesi, and the Karikkokoski sawmill was abandoned in the beginning of the 20th century.

The Karikkokoski watermill was originally usable by anyone for a fee (tullimylly), but was turned into a local mill jointly owned by four farms in 1865 due to low usage. In addition to being used for grinding grain, wadmal could also be produced at the watermill. The watermill was in use until the mid-1920s.
