= Pengerjoki =

Pengerjoki may refer to:

- Pengerjoki (river), river in Multia and Petäjävesi, Finland
- Pengerjoki (village), village in Petäjävesi, Finland
