= Jämsänvesi–Petäjävesi =

Lake in Petäjävesi

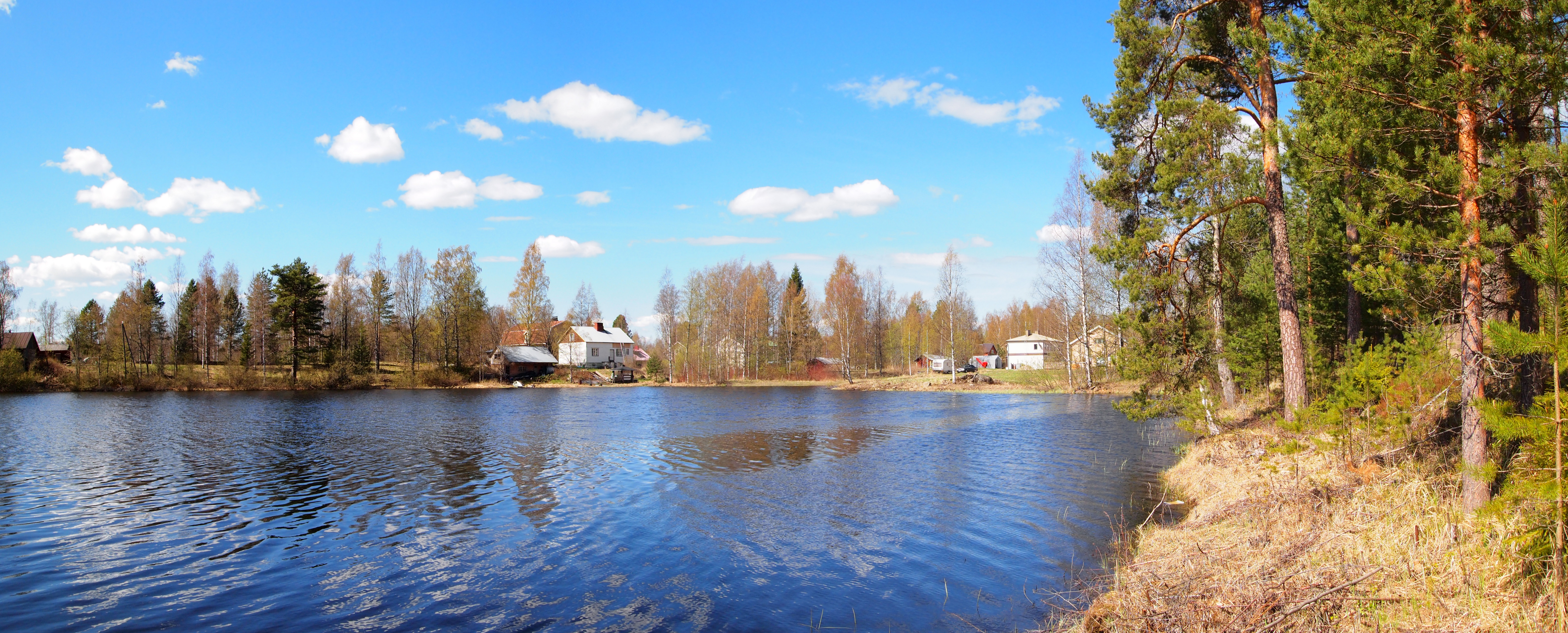
- Houses by the Kirkkolahti bay in central Petäjävesi
- Interactive map of Jämsänvesi–Petäjävesi
- Location: Petäjävesi
- Coordinates: 62.242°N 25.194°E
- Primary inflows: Könkköjoki, Pengerjoki
- Primary outflows: Piesalanjoki
- Catchment area: 664 km^{2} (256 sq mi)
- Basin countries: Finland
- Surface area: 8.84 km^{2} (3.41 sq mi)
- Average depth: 4.21 m (13.8 ft)
- Max. depth: 26.6 m (87 ft)
- Water volume: 37,187,522 cubic meters (48,639,442 cu yd)
- Shore length^{1}: 79.15 km (49.18 mi)
- Surface elevation: 111.4 m (365 ft)
- Islands: 37
- Settlements: Petäjäveden kirkonkylä
- ^{1} Shore length is not a well-defined measure.

Jämsänvesi–Petäjävesi is a lake in Petäjävesi, Finland, covering an area of 8.84 square kilometers (3.41 sq mi). It is divided into five basins, named Jämsänvesi, Petäjävesi, Kelvejärvi, Kirrinjärvi and Karikkoselkä. The outflow of the lake is the Piesalanjoki, which begins from the southern part of Petäjävesi and flows into Suolivesi.

The administrative center of Petäjävesi, Petäjäveden kirkonkylä, is located by the lake, along with the villages of Piesalankylä and Karikonkylä. Both the Finnish national road 23 and the Haapamäki–Jyväskylä railway cross the lake.

== Geography ==
=== General ===
Jämsänvesi–Petäjävesi has an area of 8.84 square kilometers (3.41 sq mi) and a volume of 37.19 million cubic meters (48,640,000 cu yd). It consists of five basins, named Jämsänvesi, Karikkoselkä, Kelvejärvi, Kirrinjärvi and Petäjävesi. The lake has a northwest-to-southeast orientation and is long and fairly narrow in shape with many capes and isthmuses, the exception being Karikkoselkä, which is an impact crater lake and therefore round in shape, except for the large Petäälahti bay connected to it. Petäjävesi is the source of the lake's outflow and the basin to which all other basins are connected.

Under the European Union's Water Framework Directive, Petäjävesi, Karikkoselkä, Jämsänvesi and Kirrinjärvi are defined as separate bodies of water, while Kelvejärvi is counted as part of Petäjävesi. The railway is defined as the border between Petäjävesi and Jämsänvesi. Their surface areas are given as follows:

- Petäjävesi: 4.08 km^{2} (1.58 sq mi)
- Karikkoselkä: 2.59 km^{2} (1.00 sq mi)
- Jämsänvesi: 1.58 km^{2} (0.61 sq mi)
- Kirrinjärvi: 69.9 ha (0.270 sq mi)

Jämsänvesi–Petäjävesi has 37 islands in total. The lake's average depth is 4.21 meters (13.8 ft), while the maximum depth is 26.6 meters (87 ft). The deepest point is in Karikkoselkä.

=== Built environment ===
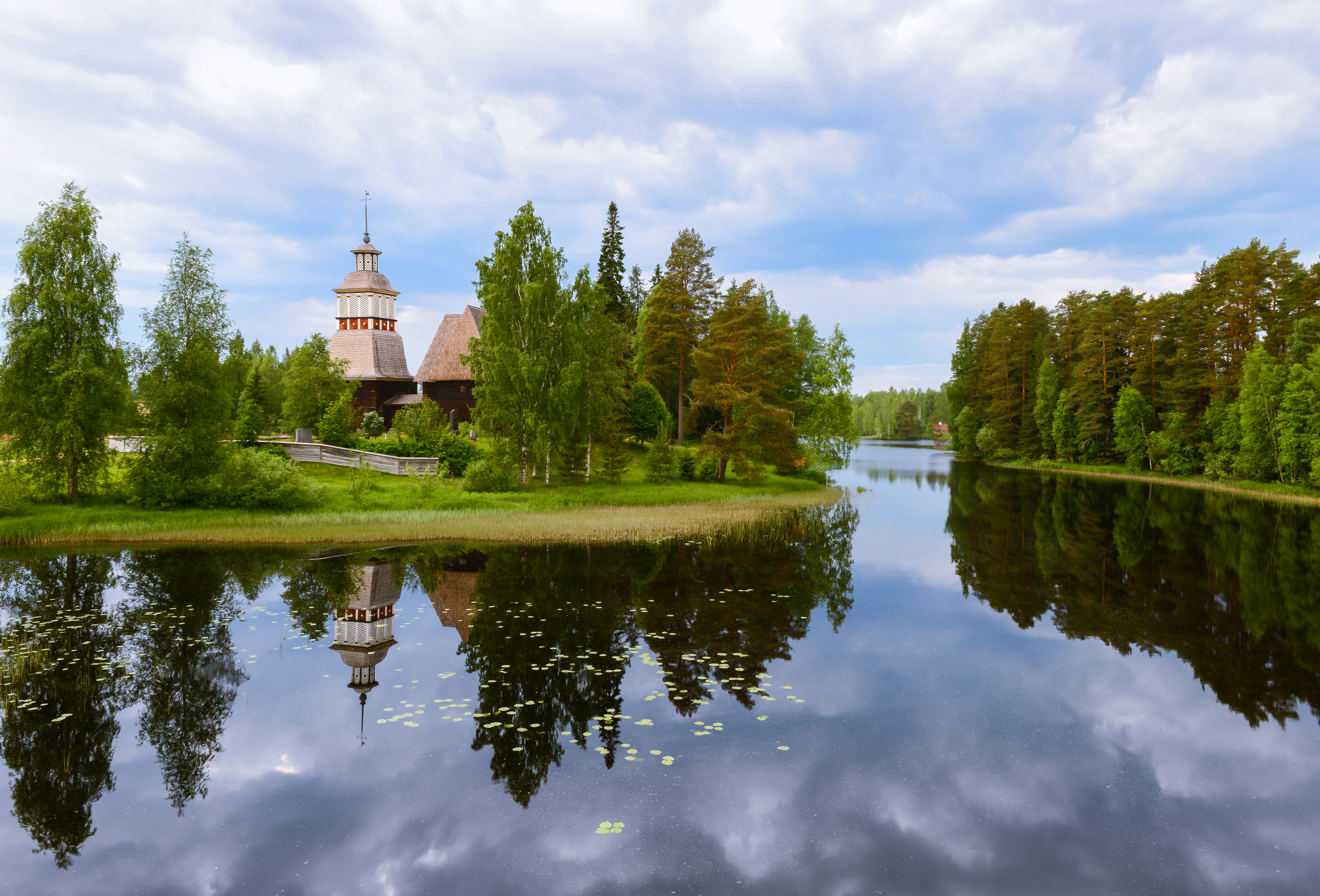
The old church of Petäjävesi by the lake

The most densely populated part of Petäjäveden kirkonkylä, the administrative center of the municipality, is located on the eastern shore of Jämsänvesi. There are also two villages further south: Piesalankylä on the southwestern shore of Petäjävesi and Karikonkylä on a peninsula between Karikkoselkä and Petäjävesi. The Finnish national road 23 and two smaller roads, as well as the Haapamäki–Jyväskylä railway, cross the lake in Petäjäveden kirkonkylä. Farmland by the lake is concentrated especially in Piesalankylä. There are two regionally significant landscape areas by the lake: the surroundings of the Petäjävesi Old Church and Piesalankylä.

=== Catchment area ===
Jämsänvesi–Petäjävesi has a catchment area of 664 square kilometers (256 sq mi). The inflow with the largest drainage basin is the Pengerjoki, draining an area of 408 km^{2} (158 sq mi) (including the basin of Merouvenjoki joining Pengerjoki near its mouth) and flowing into the northern end of Jämsänvesi. The Könkköjoki, which begins from lake Huhtia–Pyhäjärvi and drains an area of 149.9 km^{2} (57.9 sq mi), flows into Karikkoselkä. Smaller inflows include Ihakkijoki, Haapapuro and Tervapuro flowing into Jämsänvesi, Selänjoki (from lake Maakeskinen) and Levänpuro flowing into Karikkoselkä, and a stream from lake Kuristainen flowing into Kelvejärvi. The outflow of Jämsänvesi–Petäjävesi itself is the 1.9-kilometer (1.2 mi) long Piesalanjoki, which begins at the southern end of Petäjävesi and flows into Suolivesi. The surface elevation of Jämsänvesi–Petäjävesi is 111.4 meters (365 ft) above sea level, while that of Suolivesi is 109.1 meters (358 ft), giving Piesalanjoki a drop of 2.3 meters (7.5 ft). The lakes are part of the Jämsänjoki watercourse ending at Päijänne, with the total drop between it and Jämsänvesi–Petäjävesi being about 32.7 meters (107 ft).

== Environmental values ==
=== Water quality ===
Based on samples taken between 2000 and 2007, the water of Petäjävesi had a pH of 6.2, an oxygen saturation of 41.3%, a total nitrogen content of 734 μg/l, a total phosphorus content of 68.2 μg/l, a chlorophyll content of 24.4 μg/l, a turbidity of 3.6 FNU, a color value of 210.4 mg Pt/l and a Secchi depth of 0.85 m, with the overall quality classified as poor. Jämsänvesi in turn had a pH of 6, an oxygen saturation of 57.6%, a total nitrogen content of 636 μg/l, a total phosphorus content of 34.5 μg/l, a chlorophyll content of 11.7 μg/l, a turbidity of 2 FNU, a color value of 222.6 mg Pt/l and a Secchi depth of 0.87 m, with the overall quality classified as moderate. Sources of nutrient loading include urban and agricultural runoffs, as well as peat extraction in the Pengerjoki basin. In 2007, the annual nitrogen and phosphorus loads from the municipal wastewater treatment plant were estimated to be 2,810 kilograms (6,190 lb) and 98.5 kilograms (217 lb), respectively. Hypoxia in Petäjävesi has been known to occur in the summer at a depth of 3 m (9.8 ft) and under.

From the 1950s until 1976, the energy company Imatran Voima operated a wood treatment plant near Jämsänvesi, causing creosote contamination. Cleanup began in 1993 and was finished in 1999.

=== Fishing ===
Fish found in the lake include perch, pike, zander, smelt, bream, burbot, bleak, common whitefish and roach. Signal crayfish have been introduced to Karikkoselkä. Common whitefish are mainly found in Karikkoselkä and Kirrinjärvi, while brown trout are known to spawn in the Könkköjoki. Net fishing in Jämsänvesi is made difficult by the number of submerged logs, which have accumulated at the bottom of the basin due to log driving and nearby sawmills.

=== Recreation ===
The island of Solikkosaari, measuring 700 meters (2,300 ft) in length and 2.1 hectares (5.2 acres) in area, is a section of an esker covered by pine forest located near the old church. The national road 23 has split the island in half since the 1960s; there is a path on both sides, but only the northern side is accessible without crossing the road. The Evangelical Lutheran parish of Petäjävesi burned a midsummer bonfire on Solikkosaari until 1977, when the island was made a conservation area.

The 75-kilometer (47 mi) paddling route Wanha Witonen begins at the lake, passes through Koskenpää, Jämsänkoski and Jämsä proper, and ends at Päijänne. The island of Pirkonsaari along the route in the southern part of the lake has a campfire site managed by a local sailing association.

== History ==
The island of Kuoliosaari (also called Peltosensaari, Justunsaari and Huhtiansaari) in Petäjävesi is a historical burial place. The first excavations were done by Robert Tigerstedt in 1876, who found a broken skull and the remains of a coffin on the island. According to A. V. Forsman (1898), the island was a temporary burial place, where dead bodies were kept until they could be transported to the church in Jämsä in the winter, but the remains of poor people were often left on the island. A farm named Peltonen was established on the island in the 1920s; more bones were reportedly found when its owner dug a potato cellar in the 1930s.

Solikkosaari and Ryssäsaari have also been claimed to be burial islands. Solikkosaari is said to have been used as a burial place during the Great Wrath; while there are man-made pits on the island, none have been identified as graves, but instead as e.g. sand extraction pits. In 1898, Forsman recorded an explanation for the name of Ryssäsaari (lit. 'Russian island', see ryssä) according to which Russian soldiers were buried there during an unspecified war; local stories attested later specify the Great Wrath. However, Ryssäsaari is rocky and likely unsuitable for burials. The island is occupied by a seasonal home.

In 1853, the chaplain of Petäjävesi C. G. Handolin and ten local landowners suggested lowering the level of the lake by clearing rocks from rapids further down the watercourse to create more farmland and meadows on its shores, but the plan was never realized.
