= Petäjäveden kirkonkylä =

- Urban area
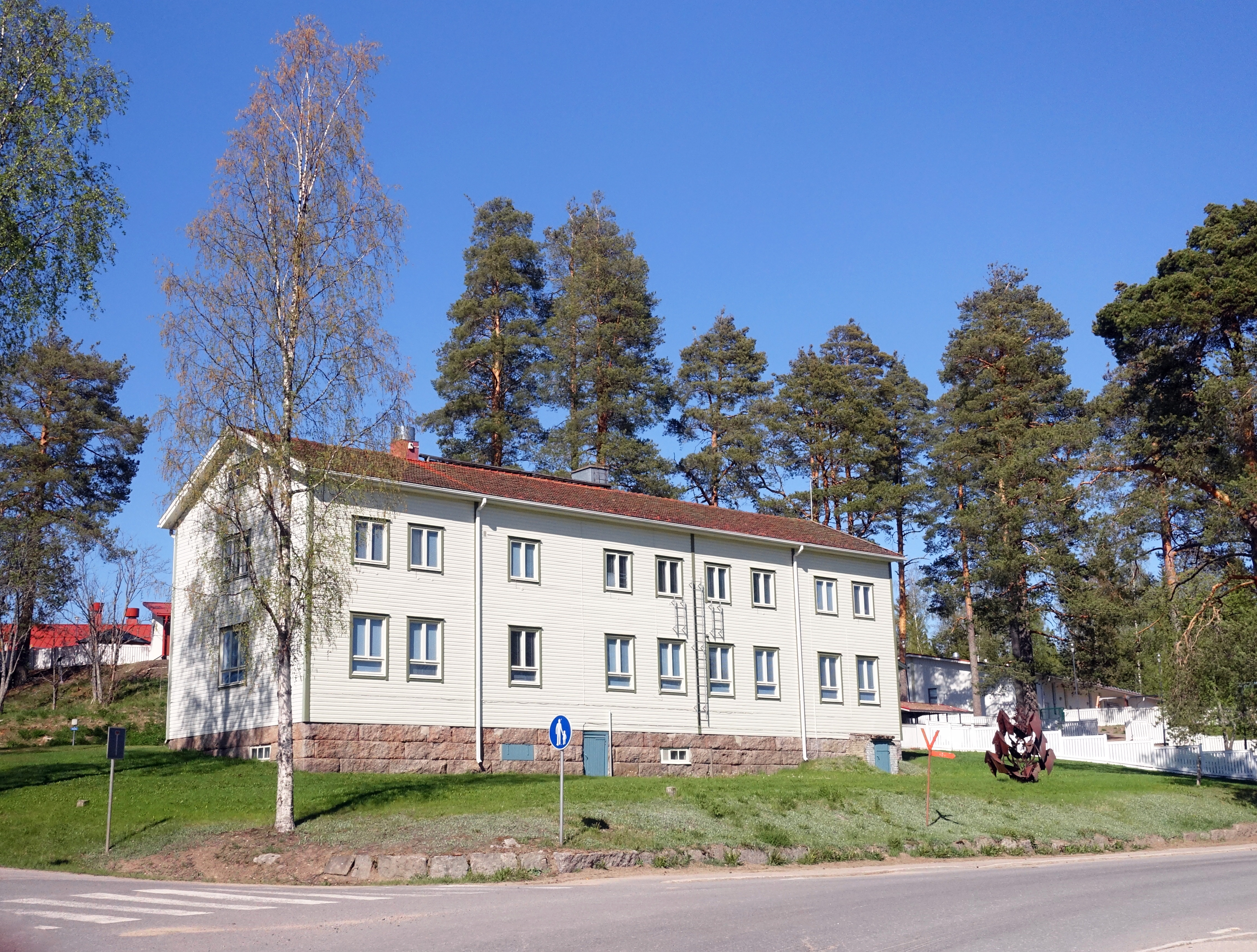
- Former municipal hall of Petäjävesi

- Location in Central Finland
- Coordinates: 62.257°N 25.184°E
- Country: Finland
- Region: Central Finland
- Sub-region: Jyväskylä sub-region
- Municipality: Petäjävesi

Population (2023), urban area
  - Total: 1,738
  - Density: 297.1/km^{2} (769/sq mi)
- Time zone: UTC+2 (EET)
  - Summer (DST): UTC+3 (EEST)

Petäjäveden kirkonkylä (lit. 'Petäjävesi church village') is an urban area (taajama) and the administrative center of the municipality of Petäjävesi, Finland, located in the central part of the municipality by lake Jämsänvesi–Petäjävesi. The national roads 18 and 23 as well as the Haapamäki–Jyväskylä railway pass through the settlement.

The first farms in the area were established in 1611. The first church was built in 1728 and replaced with a new one around 1764; the latter is today known as the Petäjävesi Old Church. The village became a municipal center in 1868.

The urban area, as defined by Statistics Finland, had a population of 1,738 on 31 December 2023.

== Geography ==
=== Location and boundaries ===
Petäjäveden kirkonkylä is located in the center of the municipality along the national roads 18 and 23 and the Haapamäki–Jyväskylä railway. Residential areas within the urban area include Halkokangas, Hätälänmäki, Hongisto, Kapakallio, Litma, Miilulampi, Olkkolanrinne and Salmela. On 31 December 2023, the urban area of Petäjäveden kirkonkylä had a population of 1,738, a surface area of 5.85 square kilometers (2.26 sq mi) and a population density of 297.1 inhabitants per square kilometer (769/sq mi).

The urban area is located within the land register village of Petäjävesi, which covered the entire southern part of the municipality around Jämsänvesi–Petäjävesi and Suolivesi, including modern villages such as Piesalankylä and Metsäkulma.

=== Nature ===
Petäjäveden kirkonkylä is located on the shores of Jämsänvesi–Petäjävesi, a lake with multiple basins connected by narrow straits. One of its islands is Solikkosaari, a 700-meter (2,300 ft), 2.1-hectare (5.2-acre) section of an esker covered by pine forest opposite to the old church. Since the late 1960s, the national road 23 has passed through the island. Solikkosaari is owned by the Evangelical Lutheran parish of Petäjävesi, who burned a midsummer bonfire there until 1977, when it was made a conservation area.

== History ==
The first farm in the village of Petäjävesi was Piesala, established in 1564 by Lauri Piesanen. In 1576, it was followed by Karikko, established by Niilo Karikko, and in 1611 by Kirri and Puttola, established by Martti and Paavo Puttonen, respectively. Kirri and Puttola were the first farms on the territory of modern Petäjäveden kirkonkylä; Piesala is instead located in modern Piesalankylä, while Karikko is in modern Karikkokylä. New farms were not established until the 18th century: Sikala and Lemettilä from Puttola respectively in 1747 and 1751, Murtoniemi from Kirri in 1760, a new Puttola from Lemettilä in 1790, and Lapinmäki from Murtoniemi in 1800. The original Puttola was merged into Lemettilä in 1752, while Murtoniemi was merged back into Kirri in 1853.

Petäjävesi was originally part of the Jämsä parish. In 1724, it was mentioned that the villagers of Petäjävesi had built their own chapel near the Puttola farm; soon after, in 1728, the first proper church was built in the village. The church was replaced with a new one c. 1764. Petäjävesi became an independent parish in 1867. Municipal administration was adopted in 1868.

The Haapamäki–Jyväskylä railway was opened for traffic in 1897. The Petäjävesi station was designed by Bruno Granholm and expanded in 1908.

In 1947, the energy company Imatran Voima acquired land along the road to Multia for the construction of a substation, the first of its kind in Central Finland and one of the most significant post-war employers in the municipality. The substation building, a brick building designed by Aarne Ervi in 1948, as well as power lines, were finished in 1950. Semi-detached houses and a sauna for workers were built soon after. The company also had a facility where wooden electricity pylons were produced, causing creosote contamination to the soil and nearby bodies of water. Cleanup operations were done in the 1990s.

The industrial area of Rautakylä was opened in 2009. By July of that year, eight metalworking enterprises had established facilities in the area.

== Services ==
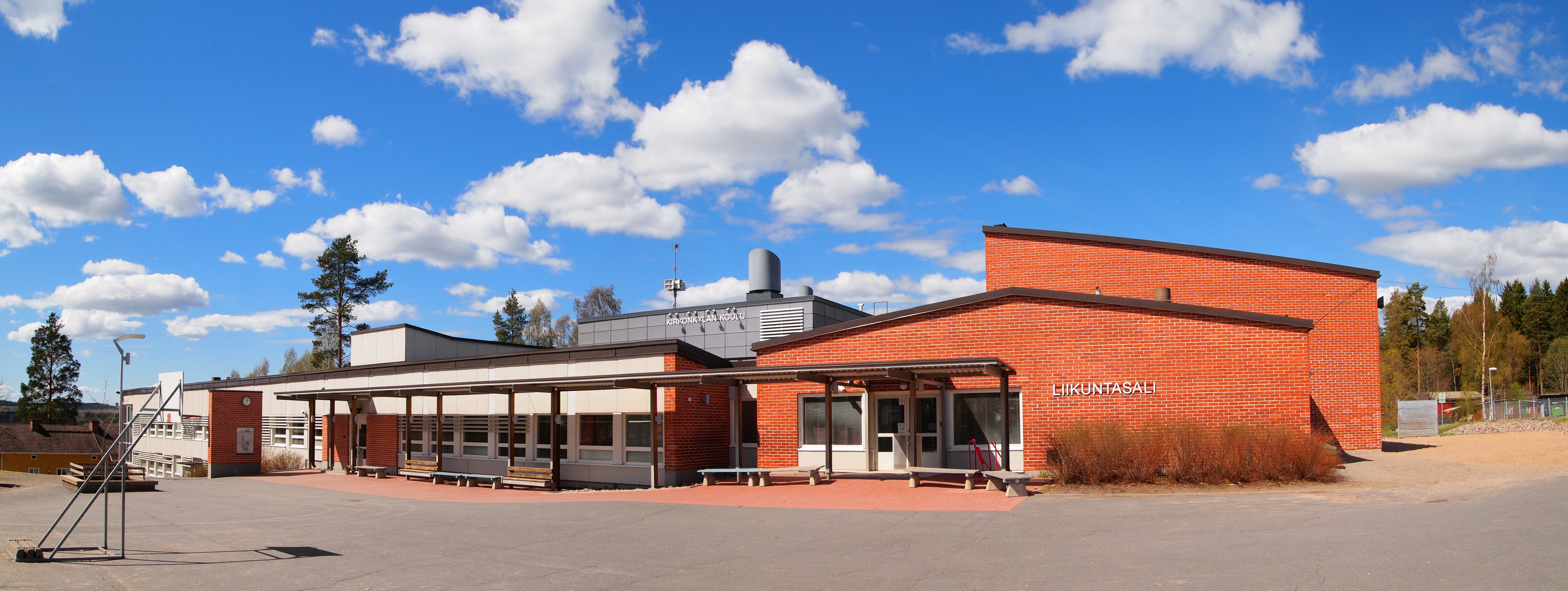
Kirkonkylän koulu in 2014

There are two comprehensive schools (peruskoulu) in the urban area: Kirkonkylän koulu for grades 1–6 (alakoulu) and Petäjäveden yläkoulu for grades 7–9. The latter shares a building with a gymnasium (lukio). The first school in Petäjäveden kirkonkylä was established in 1881.

Other services include two grocery stores and a municipal clinic.

== Churches ==
There are two Evangelical Lutheran churches in the urban area: the old church, which was built between 1763 and 1764, and the new church, built to replace the former in 1879. The old church was first renovated in 1928 and was maintained more regularly starting in the late 1950s. Since 1994, it has been a UNESCO World Heritage Site. The new church has 900 seats and has been renovated in 1937 and 2018. The area around both churches is classified as a cultural heritage site of national significance (valtakunnallisesti merkittävä rakennettu kulttuuriympäristö).

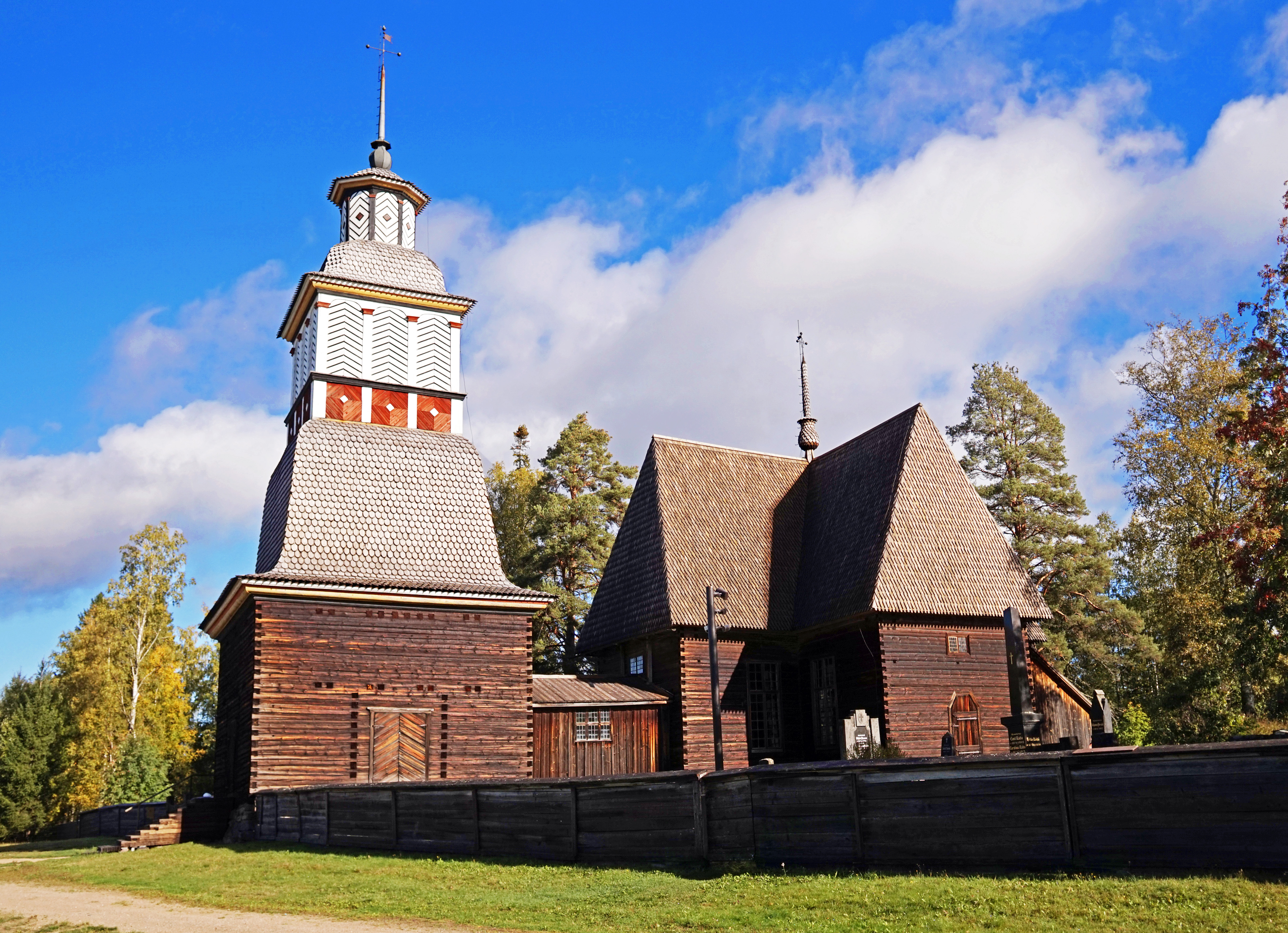
Old church

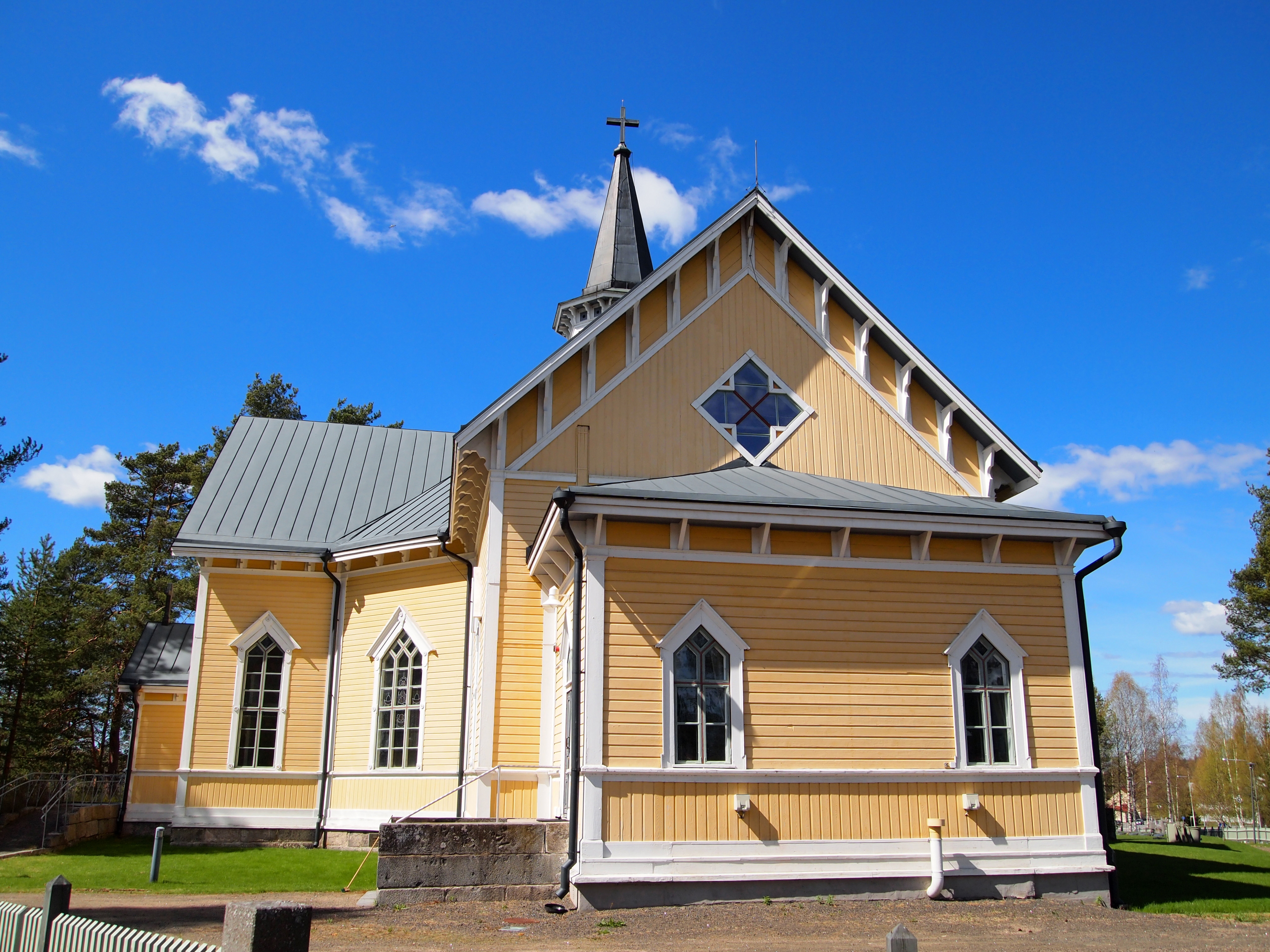
New church
