= Ylä-Kintaus =

- Village
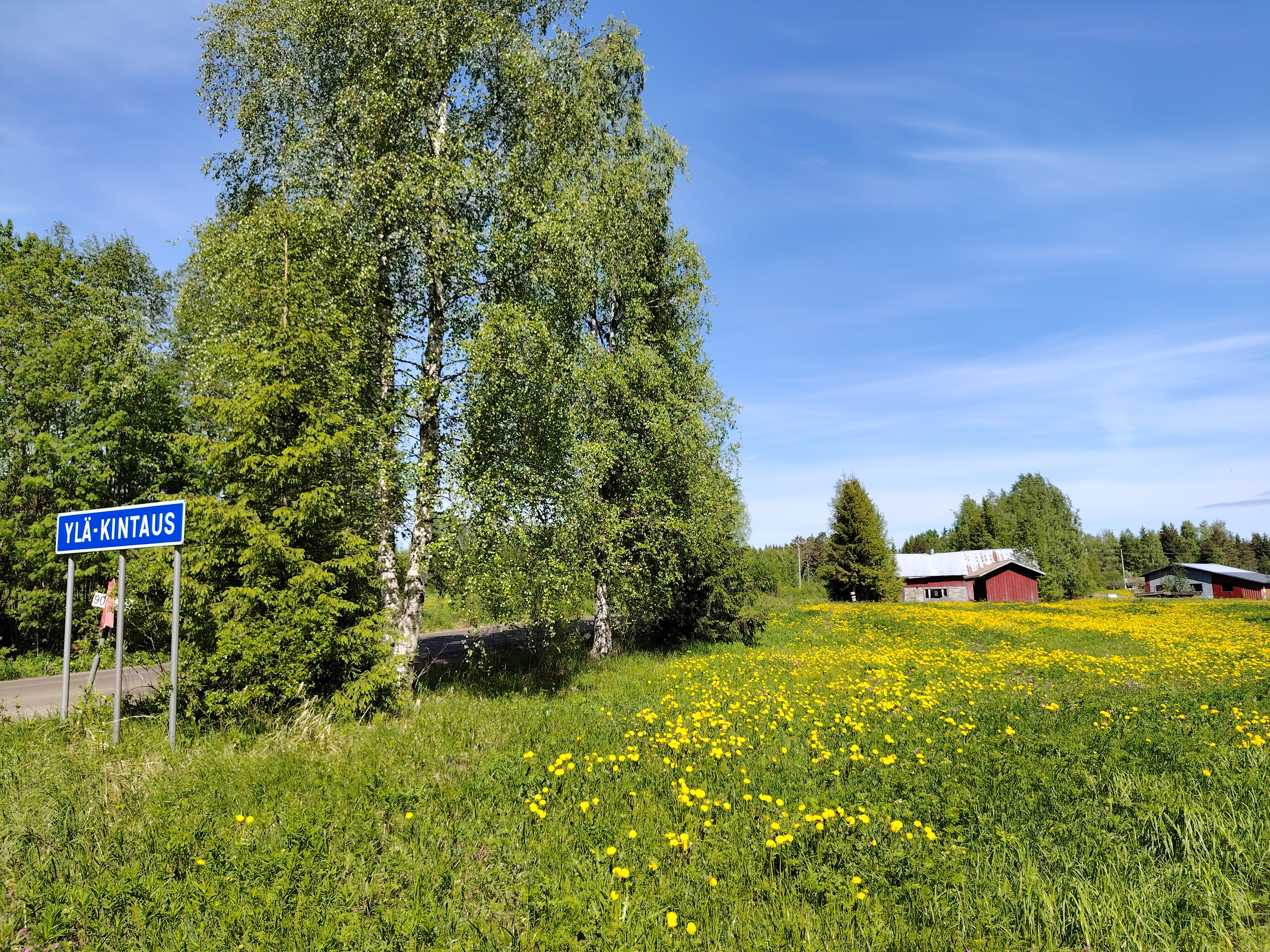
- Crossing of the road Rautamäentie with Ylä-Kintaudentie

- Location in Central Finland
- Coordinates: 62.356°N 25.323°E
- Country: Finland
- Region: Central Finland
- Sub-region: Jyväskylä sub-region
- Municipality: Petäjävesi
- Time zone: UTC+2 (EET)
  - Summer (DST): UTC+3 (EEST)

Ylä-Kintaus is a village in Petäjävesi, Finland, located in the northeastern part of the municipality around the eponymous lake and near the border with Jyväskylä.

Ylä-Kintaus has been inhabited since 1561. While not historically counted as a separate village from Kintaus to the south, it is today a distinct village that may be seen as extending beyond the borders of the municipality. Ylä-Kintaus had its own school from 1896 until 2016.

== Geography ==
=== Location and boundaries ===
Ylä-Kintaus is located in the northeastern part of Petäjävesi near the eponymous lake Ylä-Kintaus and the border with Jyväskylä. The road 6250 connects the village to Kintaus in the south and Uuraisten kirkonkylä (central Uurainen) in the north.

Modern Ylä-Kintaus is located mainly within the historical land register village of Kintaus, as well as those of Kuivasmäki and Kumpujärvi to a lesser extent. Additionally, parts of Jyväskylä and Uurainen are also closely linked to the village, namely Hepoperä in Jyväskylä and Hepomäki in Uurainen, despite historically being tied more to those municipalities/parishes. On the other hand, some people living in the eastern part of the village identify more closely with Nyrölä than with Ylä-Kintaus.

=== Nature ===
The Sallistensuo bog, located on the border between Petäjävesi and Jyväskylä, is a Natura 2000 site covering an area of 69.1 hectares (171 acres). It is a well-preserved raised bog, which has largely remained in its natural state, despite its northern part being partially drained. The site also includes old spruce forest around the bog.

== History ==
The first farm by the lake Ylä-Kintaus was Metsola, which was established in 1561 by Paavo Metsonen and is today known as Ahola. It was followed by Rautiala in 1571, Vasikkala in 1607 and Kytölä in 1611. New farms began appearing in the mid-18th century: some were established as older farms were divided, while others were established on uncultivated land. By 1860, six farms of the former and five of the latter type had been established in Ylä-Kintaus.

In the late 19th century, various industrial enterprises began to emerge nearby; while none were established in Ylä-Kintaus, they still played a role in the village's development, as they provided other ways of making a living than farm labor. The Koskensaari ironworks in Kintaus were established in 1850 and supplied with bog iron and charcoal from Ylä-Kintaus. Some villagers also worked in Koskenpää, where felt and tar were produced. Forestry also started to gain importance as a source of income starting in the 1870s. Timber from Ylä-Kintaus and Nyrölä was first transported by land to the Säikänlahti bay of lake Ylä-Kintaus, from where it was driven down to Ala-Kintaus, then loaded onto trains in Kintaus. By the 1960s, trucks had begun to be used instead.

In 2015, the municipality of Petäjävesi made plans to establish an "allergy-free residential area", comprising 20 to 30 houses, for people affected by poor indoor air quality in Ylä-Kintaus.

== Services ==
The first school in the area was established at the Räihä farm, between the centers of Ylä-Kintaus and Kintaus, in 1891. However, people from Ylä-Kintaus requested that it be moved closer to their village, which the municipality accepted in 1896. It was thereafter known as the Ylämäki school, as classes were held at the Ylämäki farm. The municipality bought the farm in 1908, after which its main building was fully repurposed into a school building. Over time, the Ylämäki school had become crowded, even after the establishment of the Hepomäki school in Uurainen in 1930, which was also attended by some children from Ylä-Kintaus. Proposals to build a second school near the Särkimäki farm in the northwestern part of Ylä-Kintaus were made, but never realized. The old building was replaced with a new one in 1962. In 2015, due to the poor condition of the building, the students were relocated to the Kintaus school. The Ylämäki school was officially closed in 2016 and the building was sold to the local village association.

In the early 20th century, Ylä-Kintaus also had a store (a branch of Kintauden osuuskauppa) and a credit union.
