= Petäjävesi Baptist Church =

- Petäjävesi Baptist Congregation
- Finnish: Petäjäveden baptistiseurakunta
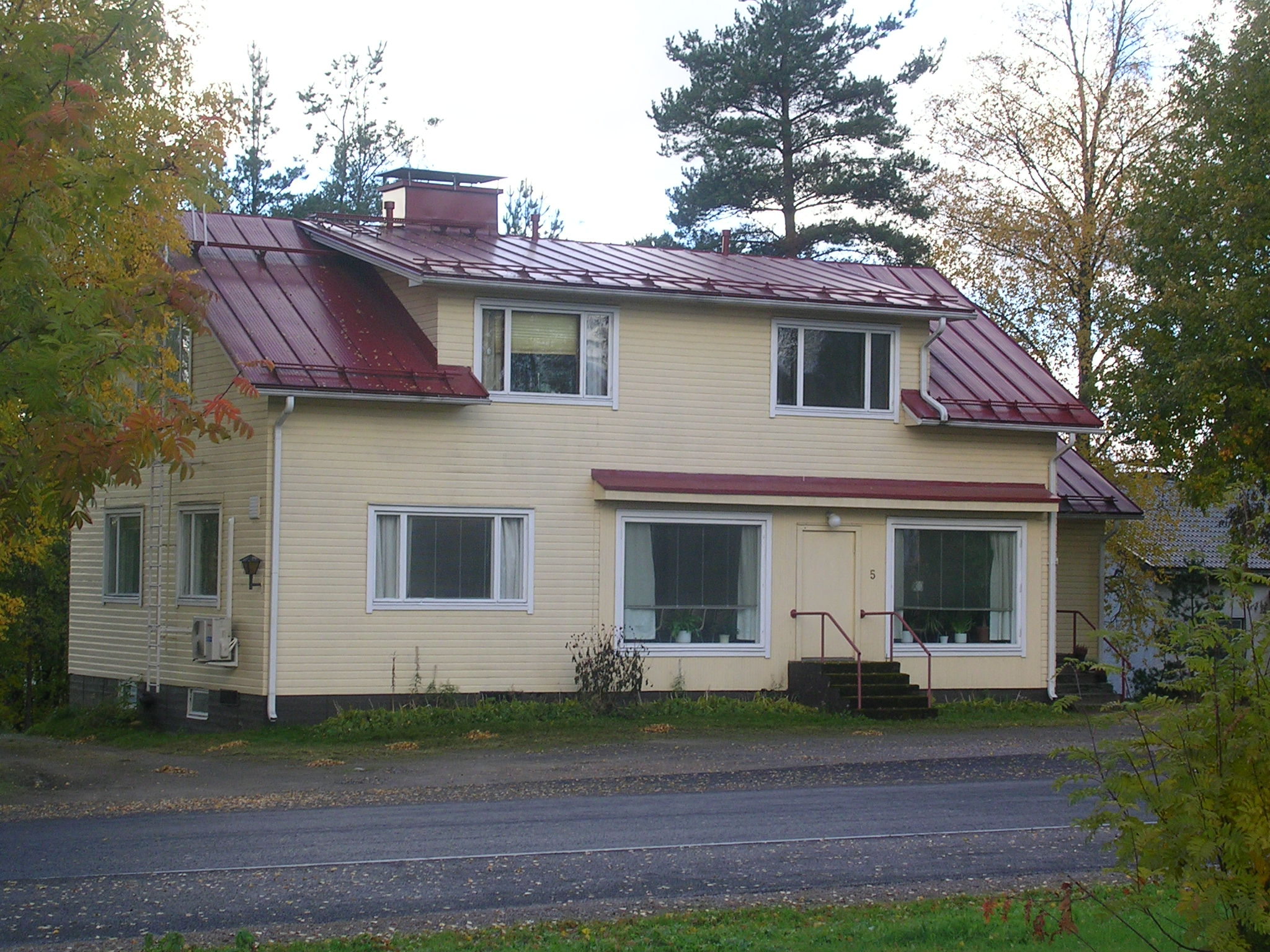
- The current office building in 2018
- Petäjävesi Baptist Church
- 62°15′30.23″N 25°11′01.45″E
- Location: Petäjävesi (formerly Multia)
- Country: Finland
- Website: petajavedenbaptistiseurakunta.fi

History
- Founded: 1906 (in Multia); 29 July 1928 (in Petäjävesi)

Administration
- Diocese: Finnish Baptist Church

The Petäjävesi Baptist Church (also known as the Petäjävesi Baptist Congregation; Finnish: Petäjäveden baptistiseurakunta) is a Finnish Baptist congregation in Petäjävesi, Finland. The congregation was originally founded in the Multia municipality with 12 people in 1906, but the focus of the congregation's activities shifted to Petäjävesi after 1913.

The current office building of the Petäjävesi Baptist Church was completed in 1985.

== History ==
Originally known as the Multia Baptist Church (Multian baptistiseurakunta), it was the first Baptist congregation in Central Finland to meet regularly. At the founding meeting, 28 members joined the church, but within a couple of years the number doubled. The first leader of the church was the watchmaker Walfred Karala. During the Multia period, the church met in the large living room of the Karala house.

Baptists religion gained a foothold in Petäjävesi as early as 1907, when Aleksius Hiljanen and Anton Mustonen visited the town on conference trips. In the 1910s, the focus of the Multia congregation shifted to Petäjävesi. In 1927, Karala moved to the Petäjävesi parish village and his home became a base for Baptist work. In April 1927, a revival broke out in Petäjävesi, especially among the youth. Among others, Ilmari Toivola came to faith in this revival. A few years later, Karala and Toivola held meetings together in the Central Finland region.

To its current location, the Petäjävesi Baptist Church was founded on July 29, 1928, and Walfred Karala was elected as its leader, and Aleksius Hiljanen, K. Heino, N. Nieminen and M. Lehtonen were elected as elders. The revival continued in the community, and the following year 16 converts were baptized there. In the summer of 1929, the Multia Baptist Church was merged, after which its official name was the Multia–Petäjävesi Baptist Church.

== See also ==
- Baptists in Finland

== Sources ==
=== Further reading ===
- Lohikko, Anneli (2006). Baptismi Suomessa 1856–2006 (in Finnish). Tampere: Kharis Oy. ISBN 951-97895-4-5.
- Edén, David (1931). Svenska baptisterna i Finland (in Swedish). Vaasa.
