= Frans Lehtonen =

Finnish politician

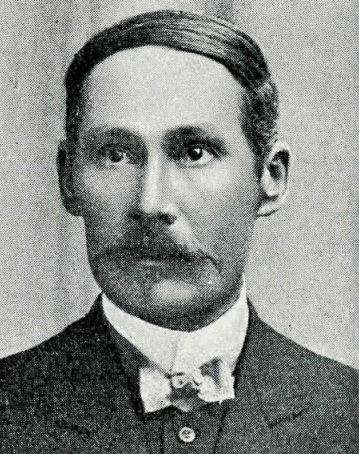
Image of Frans Lehtonen

Frans Lehtonen (7 October 1859 - 27 June 1920) was a Finnish blacksmith and politician, born in Petäjävesi in the Central Finland region. He was a member of the Parliament of Finland from 1908 to 1916, representing the Social Democratic Party of Finland.
