= Kintaus =

- Village
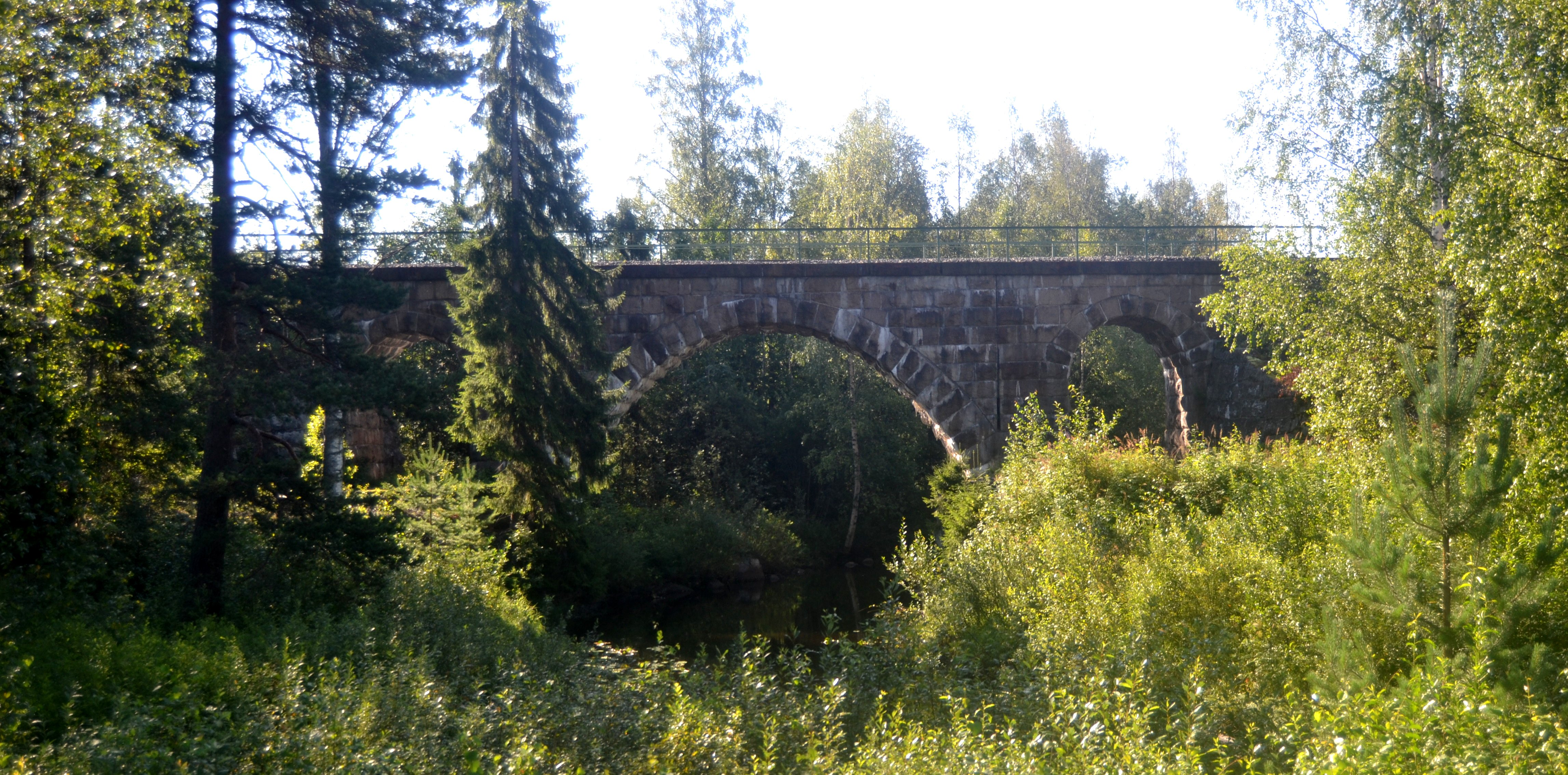
- Koskensaari railway bridge

- Location in Central Finland Kintaus (Finland)
- Coordinates: 62.270°N 25.350°E
- Country: Finland
- Region: Central Finland
- Sub-region: Jyväskylä sub-region
- Municipality: Petäjävesi

Population (2023), urban area
  - Total: 266
  - Density: 187.3/km^{2} (485/sq mi)
- Time zone: UTC+2 (EET)
  - Summer (DST): UTC+3 (EEST)

Kintaus (Finnish pronunciation: [ˈkint̪ɑus̠]) is a village and urban area in Petäjävesi, Finland. The village is located in eastern Petäjävesi, on the shores of the lake Ala-Kintaus, as well as along the Finnish national road 18/23 and the Haapamäki–Jyväskylä railway. The distance to the center of Petäjävesi is 8 kilometers (5.0 mi), while the distance to the regional center Jyväskylä is 24 kilometers (15 mi).

The urban area of Kintaus, as defined by Statistics Finland, had a population of 266 on 31 December 2023.

== Naming and etymology ==
The name of Kintaus is inflected as e.g. Kintaudella (adessive, "in Kintaus"), in the local dialect pronounced as Kintauvella or Kintavuuella. The village is named after the lakes Ala-Kintaus and Ylä-Kintaus, and the toponym was first recorded in 1530 as Kindaus.

The etymology of the name is unclear. According to Sirkka Paikkala, it may derive from the verb kinnata "to drag", either in reference to dragging boats across the isthmus between Ala-Kintaus and Ylä-Kintaus, or to dragging of a seine net. Alpo Räisänen disputes this, as -us : -uden is not a deverbal suffix, while also pointing out that there is no nt–nn gradation in the verb kinnata, meaning it is conjugated as e.g. kinnaan "I drag", not *kintaan. Räisänen instead proposes that the name contains a directly unattested word *kinta also appearing in other Tavastian place names, comparing it to place names containing the noun kinner or kinttu, referring to (parts of) a leg or foot. As most names with these elements are those of hills, seemingly in reference to walking up them being tiring, the name of Kintaus may therefore have a similar origin.

The village is sometimes also called Ala-Kintaus, in contrast to the village of Ylä-Kintaus.

== Geography ==
=== General ===
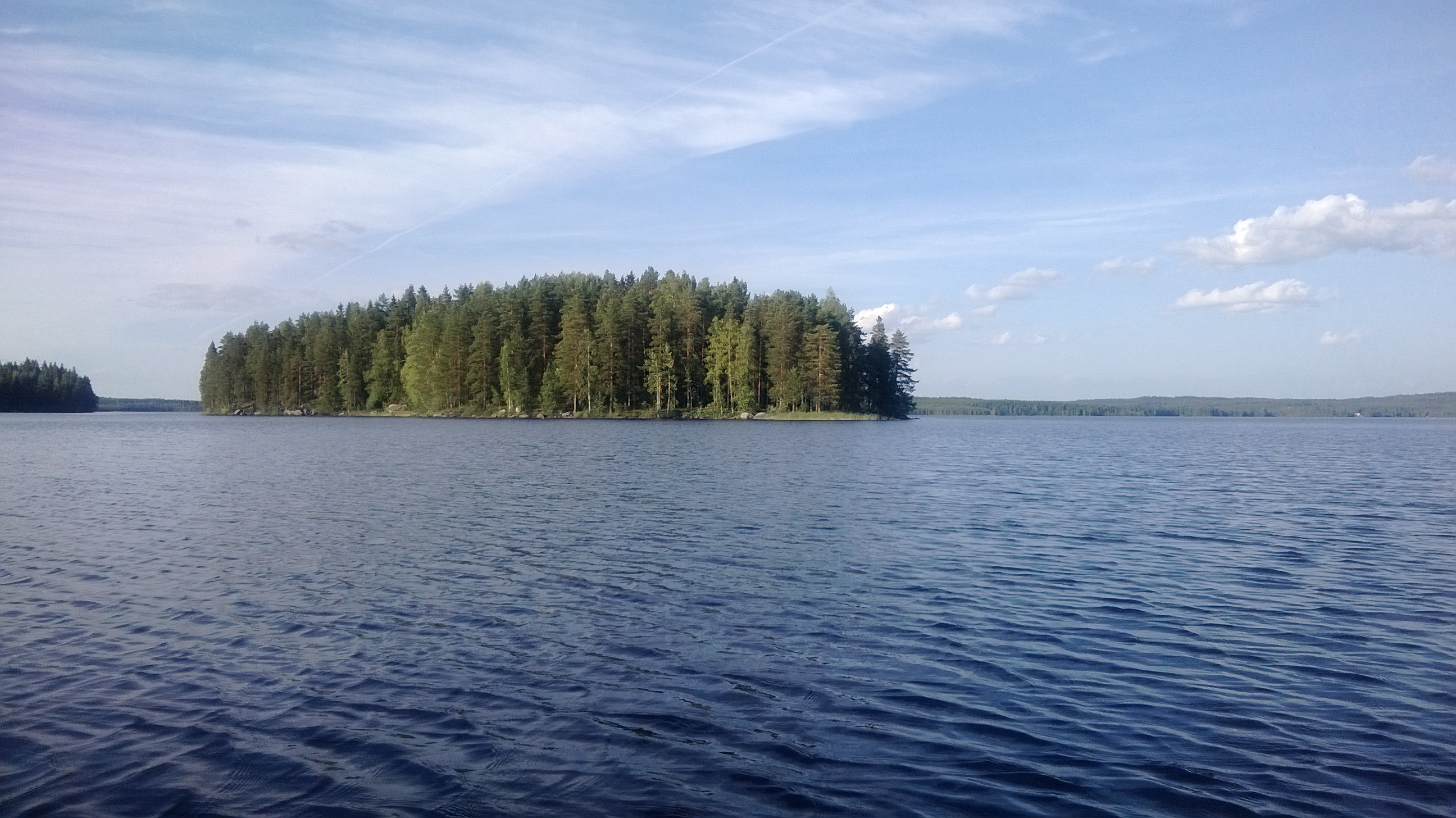
The island Kuoliosaari in Ala-Kintaus.

Kintaus is located in the eastern part of Petäjävesi, 8 kilometers (5.0 mi) away from the municipal center and 24 kilometers (15 mi) from Jyväskylä. Both the Finnish national road 18/23 and Haapamäki–Jyväskylä railway pass through the village, being significant elements of its landscape along with the lake Ala-Kintaus. Other lakes or ponds include Kipponen, Rautajalka, Vehkalampi and Lauttalampi, all of which are part of the Jämsänjoki watershed. Much of the area is forested, with fields being found only around the village center.

=== Boundaries ===
On 31 December 2023, the urban area of Kintaus had a population of 266, a surface area of 1.42 square kilometers (0.55 sq mi) and a population density of 187.3 inhabitants per square kilometer (485/sq mi). The urban area includes the densely populated part of Kintaus southwest of the lake Ala-Kintaus.

Kintaus was one of Petäjävesi's official land register villages (rekisterikylä), which covered most of eastern Petäjävesi around Ala-Kintaus and Ylä-Kintaus, including much of the modern villages of Liisalanperä and Ylä-Kintaus. Land register villages often did not correspond to local definitions of villages and since 2014, their names have no longer appeared in property registers.

== History ==
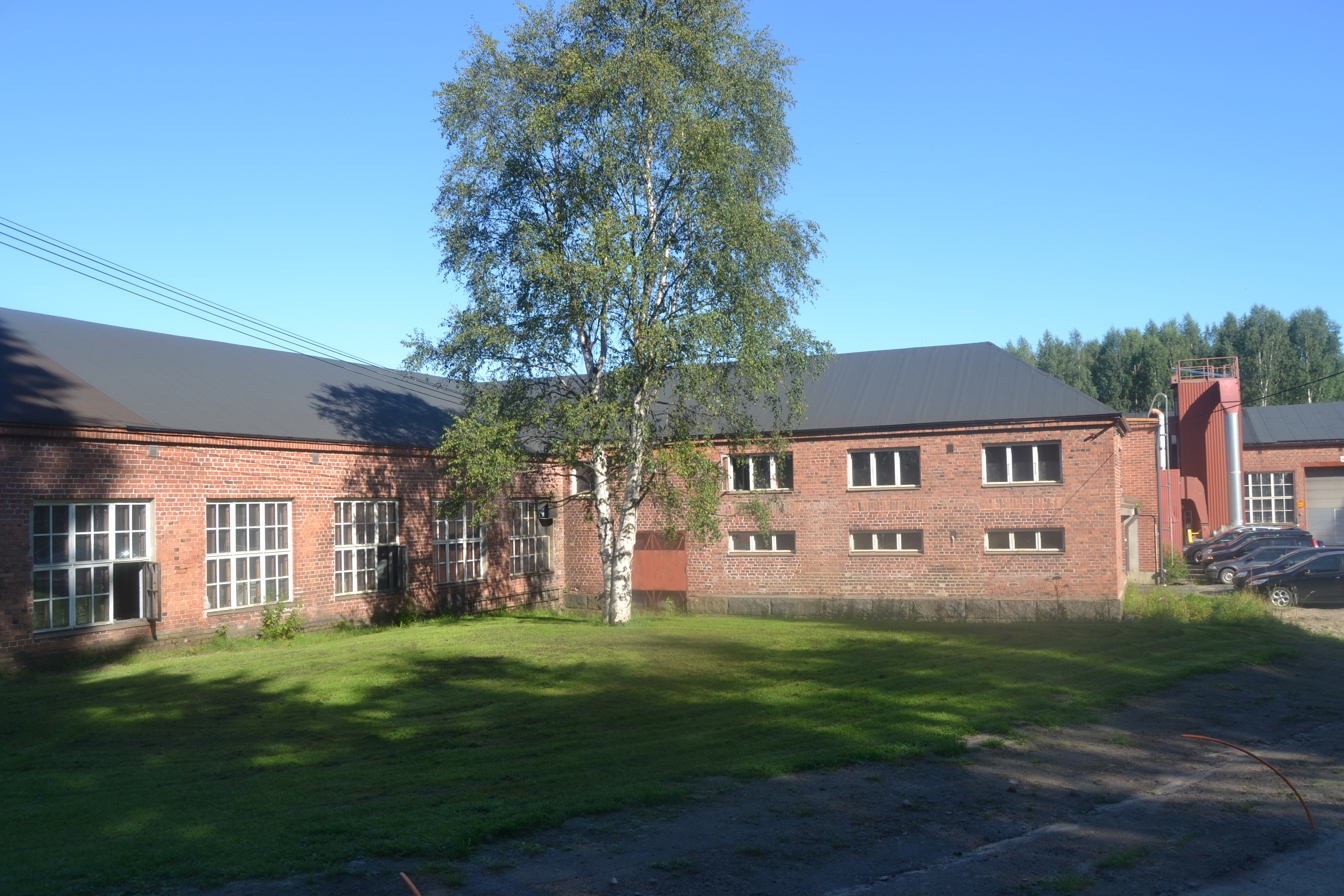
Koskensaari nail factory

Before being settled in the mid-16th century, the lands of modern Kintaus were held as hunting grounds by land-owning farmers from Pälkäne and Akaa. At least two possessions are known from a listing made in the early 1550s: one belonging to Olavi Pekanpoika from the village of Töykänä (Pälkäne) (Note: The village of Töykänä was later part of Sahalahti, which is part of modern Kangasala.) and another to Lauri Pekanpoika from Taipale (Akaa).

The village of Kintaus was established in 1554 by three Savonian settlers named Heikki Simonen, Paavo Minkkinen and Mikko Marttinen. However, by 1561 all three had left the area, now inhabited by Pekka Honkonen, Niilo Honkonen, Juho Silvonen and Paavo Metsonen. By 1572, only Paavo Metsonen had remained in Kintaus, now accompanied by three new settlers named Niilo Pekkanen, Antti Räihä and Olli Tourunen. It was around this time when the farms of Kintaus acquired their later names, respectively Metsola, Pekkala, Räihä and Rautiala. Five new farms were established in the early 17th century: Veitsikkä and Vasikkala in 1607, Kytölä and another Veitsikkä in 1611, and one with an unknown name in 1617. Out of these farms, Metsola (Ahola), Rautiala, Vasikkala and Kytölä are located in modern Ylä-Kintaus.

The amount of farms in Kintaus grew quickly during the 18th and 19th centuries, as old farms were divided and new ones were established on uninhabited lands during the Great Partition. By 1860, there were 29 independent farms and 45 tenant farms in the village.

The Koskensaari ironworks were established in 1850 after Alexander Juslén, who had until then owned the Korkeakoski ironworks in Pielavesi, moved to Kintaus. Initially wrought iron was produced using local bog iron, but after the ironworks were modernized in 1876, pig iron imported from Sweden began to be used instead. Mechanical production of nails and horseshoes began in 1889. Around the same time, Koskensaari was expanded to include a sawmill and a tar factory.

After the Haapamäki–Jyväskylä railway was finished in 1897, a railway station was built in Kintaus. After the railway was rerouted in the 1920s, a new station accompanied by two houses for railway workers was built in 1926.

Production in Koskensaari became more focused on nails in the 1910s, with tar and wood products no longer being produced after the 1930s. Until 1963, Koskensaari was somewhat of a closed community, where jobs were largely inherited. At its peak, the factory employed some 120 people. The nail factory, now owned by Helsingin Rauta Oy, is still active as of 2026.

The construction of the Pekkala, Petäjäaho and Paloniemi residential areas began in 2003.

== Services ==
=== School ===
There is a school for grades 1–6 of peruskoulu in Kintaus, with approximately 100 students. The school shares its building with a daycare center, which are among the main employers in the village.

The first school of Kintaus (under the kansakoulu system) was established in 1891 at the Räihä farm. While the school was relocated to the village of Ylä-Kintaus in 1896, a new school was established soon after in 1898 by the owner of the Koskensaari factories. Initially private, the school was transferred to municipal ownership in 1911. Its original main building was finished in 1926 and expanded in 1967.

The municipality of Petäjävesi adopted the modern peruskoulu system in 1974. A new main building for the school was built in 2000 and expanded in 2011.

=== Private businesses ===
Other services in Kintaus include a snack bar with a convenience store, as well as various forestry services. Handicrafts and carpentry are also produced in the village.

== Notable buildings ==
There are four regionally significant built environments in Kintaus: the railway station, the area around the Koskensaari nail factory, the Niemelä farm and the Räihä farm.

== Notable people ==
- Mika Aaltola (born 1969), political scientist
