= Karikkoselkä =

Lake in Finland

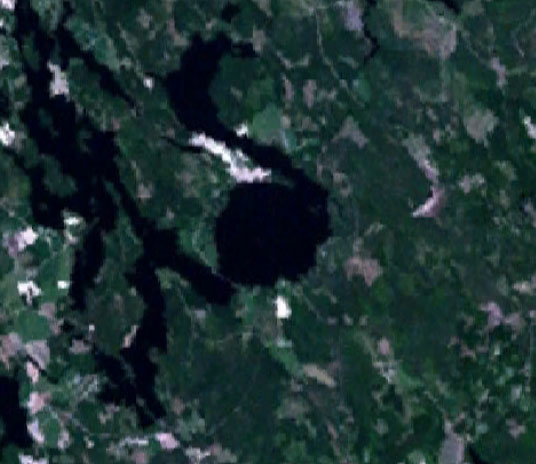
- Landsat 7 image of Karikkoselkä.

- Location within Finland

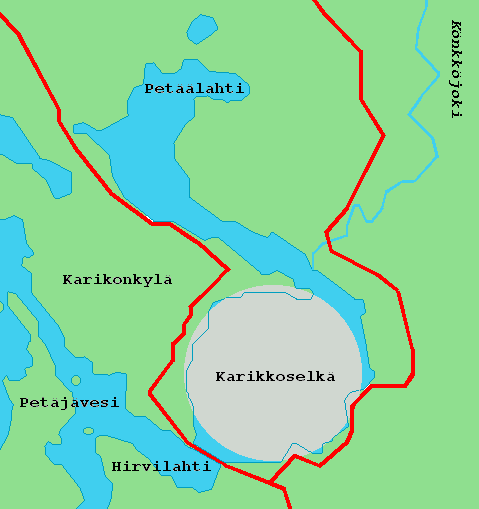
- The lake with the impact structure area in grey.
- Location: Petäjävesi
- Coordinates: 62°13′N 25°15′E
- Type: Impact crater lake
- Primary inflows: Könkköjoki
- Primary outflows: Autionsalmi
- Basin countries: Finland
- Max. depth: 26 m (85 ft)
- Surface elevation: 111.1 m (365 ft)

Karikkoselkä is a lake formed in an impact crater in Petäjävesi, Finland. Karikkoselkä is located in Central Finland approximately 30 km east of the centre of Keurusselkä, a much older and larger impact crater. Most lakes in the region are elongated in a northwest–southeast direction due to glaciation, but Karikkoselkä is strikingly round.

Many shatter cones, rock formations that form under the extreme pressures of impact, have been found around the lake. Further evidence comes from aeromagnetic maps, which show a clear magnetic anomaly in the impact crater area. In addition, samples collected from deep drillings into the lake bottom confirm the impact origin of the structure.

The crater is the smallest identified in Finland, 1.4 km diameter and 150 m deep. Due to sediments the lake has a maximum depth of 26 m which is unusually deep for a lake in the region. Karikkoselkä is estimated to be between 230 Ma and 450 Ma (million years old), most likely near 240 Ma (Triassic or earlier). Some sources give an unreasonably young age of 1.88 Ma, which is likely a misquotation – the discovery paper mentions that the bedrock in the region (known as the Central Finland Granite Complex) formed about 1.88 Ga (billion years ago), in the late Paleoproterozoic era.

There is evidence of a Neolithic settlement on the southern shore of the lake. According to a plate erected there, no excavations have yet been conducted and the settlement's age remains unknown.

== See also ==
- Impact craters in Finland
