= Finnish national road 23 =

Road in Finland

National Road 23
- Valtatie 23 (Finnish); Riksväg 23 (Swedish)
- Finnish Lake Road; Finnish: Järvi-Suomen tie Swedish: Insjöfinlands vägen
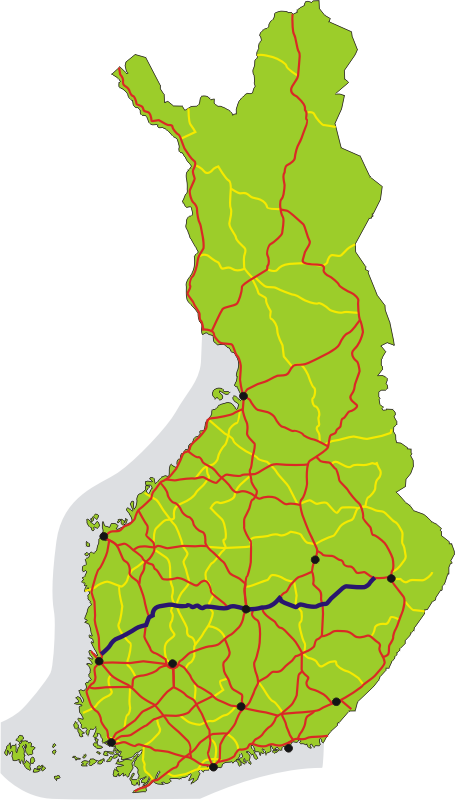

Route information
- Maintained by the Finnish Transport Agency
- Length: 517 km (321 mi)

Major junctions
- From: Pori
- To: Joensuu

Location
- Country: Finland
- Major cities: Jyväskylä

Highway system
- Highways in Finland

The Finnish national road 23 (Finnish: Valtatie 23, Swedish: Riksväg 23) is a highway between Western and Eastern Finland that runs between the cities of Pori and Joensuu via Jyväskylä. The length of the road is 517 kilometres (321 mi). The road is also called the Finnish Lake Road (Finnish: Järvi-Suomen tie, Swedish: Insjöfinlands vägen), as it runs through the Finnish Lakeland area in the central hinterland of the country.

The road is almost entirely two-lane, except for the motorway section shared with Highways 4, 9 and 13 in the Jyväskylä sub-region, the short four-lane section located in the center of Varkaus and the motorway section common to Highway 9 in Joensuu. The road has been built over decades in several different parts, and its quality varies significantly. For most of the current highway route, the road was completely absent before the main sections were built mainly in the 1960s and 1970s. Highway 23 road came at the turn of the 1970s and 1980s.

== Route ==
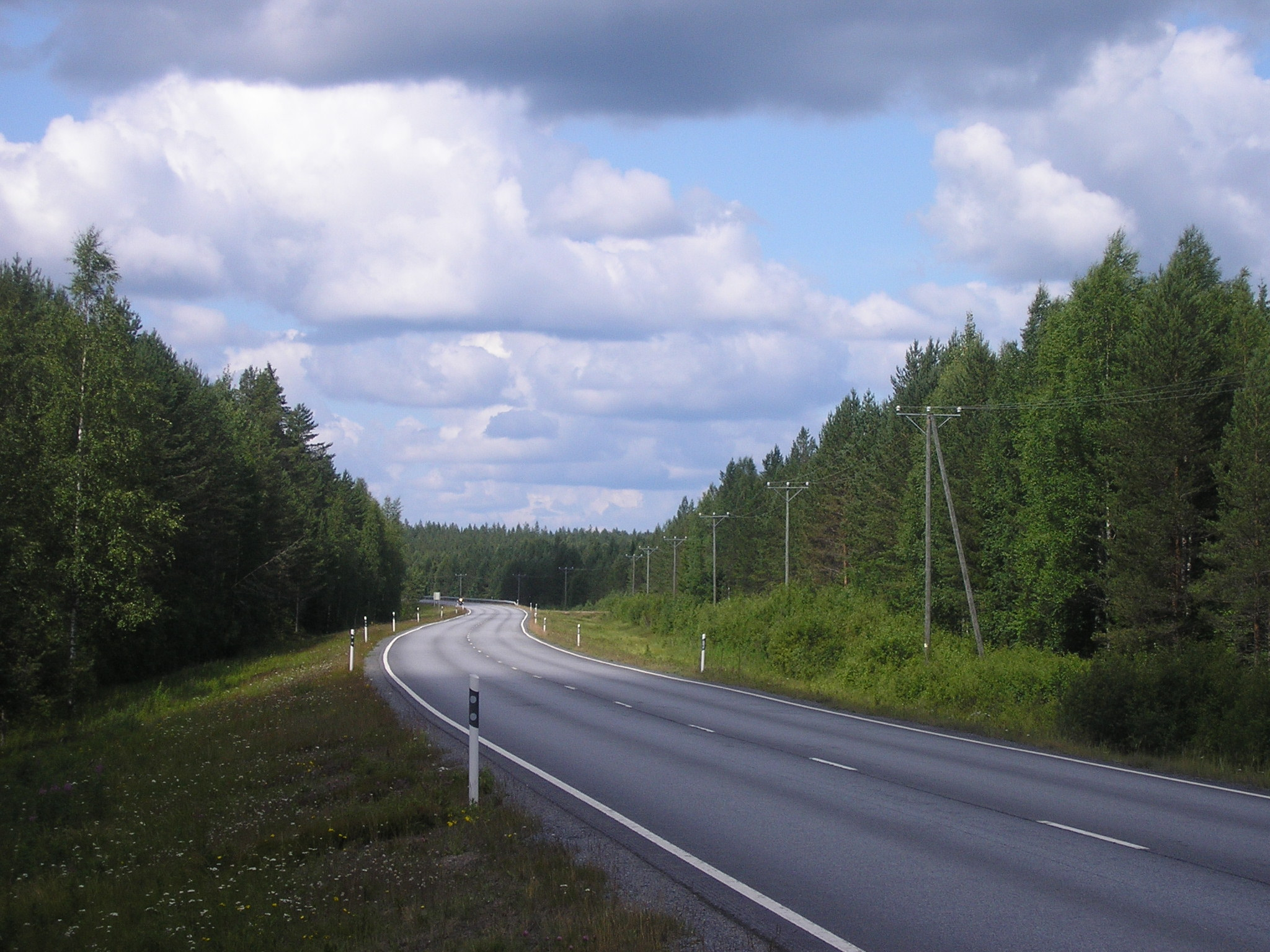
Road between Keuruu and Virrat.

The road passes through the following municipalities, localities in brackets:

Pori-Pomarkku–Kankaanpää–Jämijärvi–Parkano–Ikaalinen–Parkano (again)–Kihniö–Virrat–Keuruu–Petäjävesi–Jyväskylä–Laukaa–Hankasalmi–Pieksämäki–Joroinen–Pieksämäki (again)–Joroinen (again)–Pieksämäki (again)–Joroinen (again)–Varkaus–Leppävirta–Heinävesi–Leppävirta (again)–Heinävesi (again)–Liperi–Joensuu.

== See also ==
- Finnish national road 13

== Sources ==
- Autoilijan tiekartta 2007 (in Finnish). Helsinki: AffectoGenimap Finland Oy. 2006. ISBN 978-951-593-047-7.
- Grönroos, Matti. "Valtatie 23 Pori–Joensuu, 517 km" (in Finnish).
- "Kansalaisen karttapaikka" (in Finnish). Maanmittauslaitos.
- "Retkikartta.fi" (in Finnish). Vantaa: Metsähallitus. 2007.
