= Petäjävesi Old Church =

UNESCO World Heritage Site
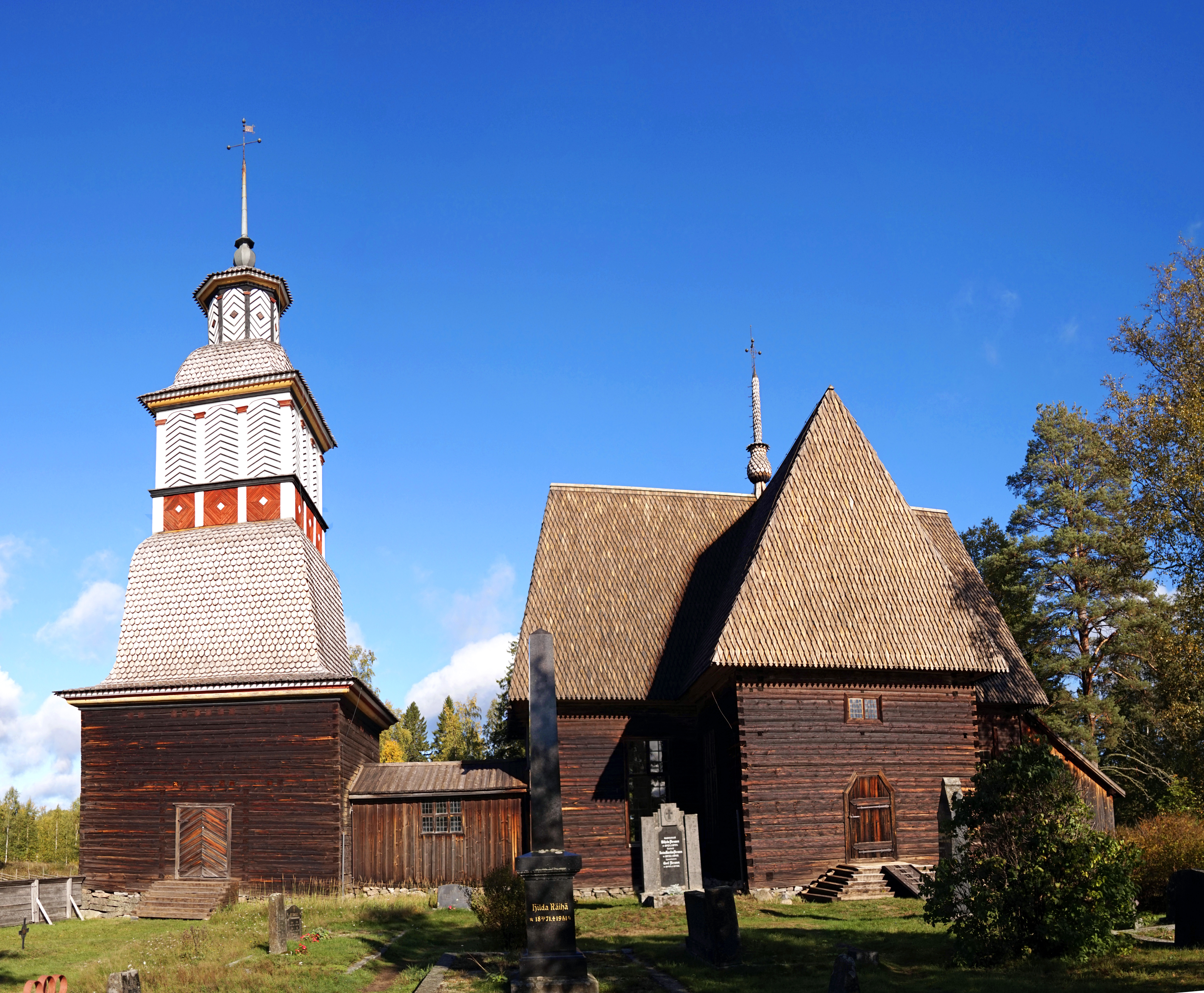
- The old church of Petäjävesi

- Location within Finland
- Location: Petäjävesi, Finland
- Criteria: Cultural: (iv)
- Reference: 584
- Inscription: 1994 (18th Session)
- Area: 2.98 ha (7.4 acres)
- Buffer zone: 48.44 ha (119.7 acres)
- Website: www.petajavedenseurakunta.fi/kiinteistot/petajaveden-vanha-kirkko/
- Coordinates: 62°15′N 25°11′E

The Petäjävesi Old Church (Finnish: Petäjäveden vanha kirkko) is a wooden church located in Petäjävesi, Finland. It was built between 1763 and 1765, when Tavastia was still a part of Sweden. The bell tower was built in 1821. It was inscribed in 1994 on the UNESCO World Heritage List for its testimony to the wooden church architecture of the Nordic countries.

The church is located about 1 kilometre (0.62 mi) to the west of the centre of Petäjävesi. It is a popular church for weddings in the summer, and there is a church service on most Sundays.

== History and Construction ==
The church was built as the chapel for the area of Petäjävesi, which has belonged to the congregation of Jämsä. The local people had been given the permission to build a graveyard and a small village church at their own expense by the crown as early as in 1728 because the trip to the nearest church in Jämsä was long, however it took about 35 years until the construction began. The church was planned and built by Jaakko Klemetinpoika Leppänen, a church builder from Vesanka. In 1821 the windows were enlarged and the sacristy was moved from the northern part of the church to the east. The bell tower was also added by Erkki Leppänen, the grandson of the original builder. The church went out of use in 1879 when the new church was built.

== Architecture ==
Originally built entirely of pine logs, the old church has retained its original appearance and its interior decoration exceptionally well. The church demonstrates influences from the Gothic, Renaissance, and Baroque architectural styles. The cross-type floor plan of the church, with similar-sized arms, came into use in the Nordic countries at the end of the 17th century and became common in the 18th century in the countryside churches. However, the high roof resembles the earlier Gothic style, and the octagonal roof with a circular design is derived from the oculus of Renaissance architecture. The interior of the church is likewise well-preserved from its use during the 18th and 19th centuries. The pulpit, pews, galleries, and chandeliers were all hand-carved by local craftsmen from pine wood.

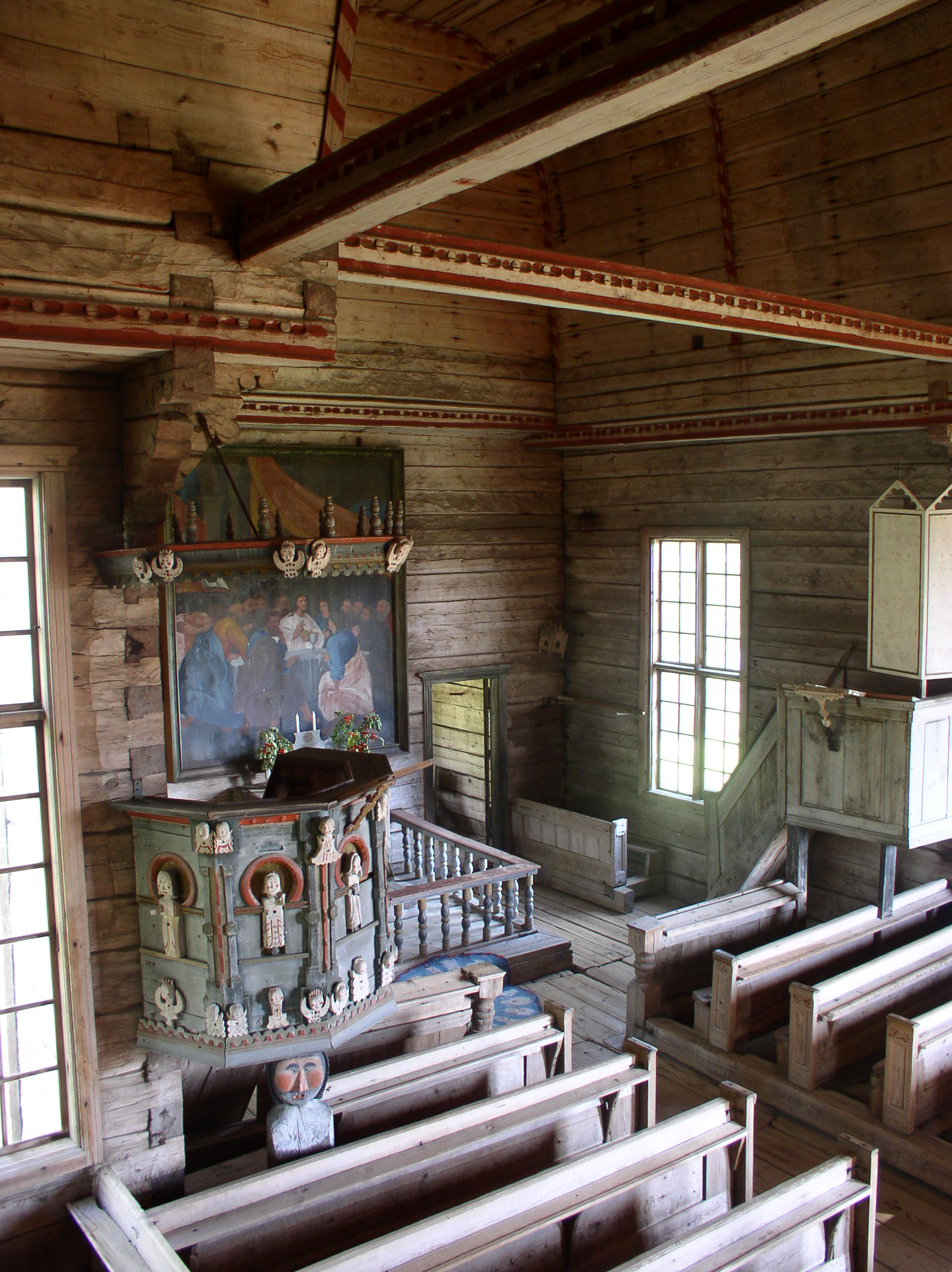
Inner view from northern balcony to direction of the cover

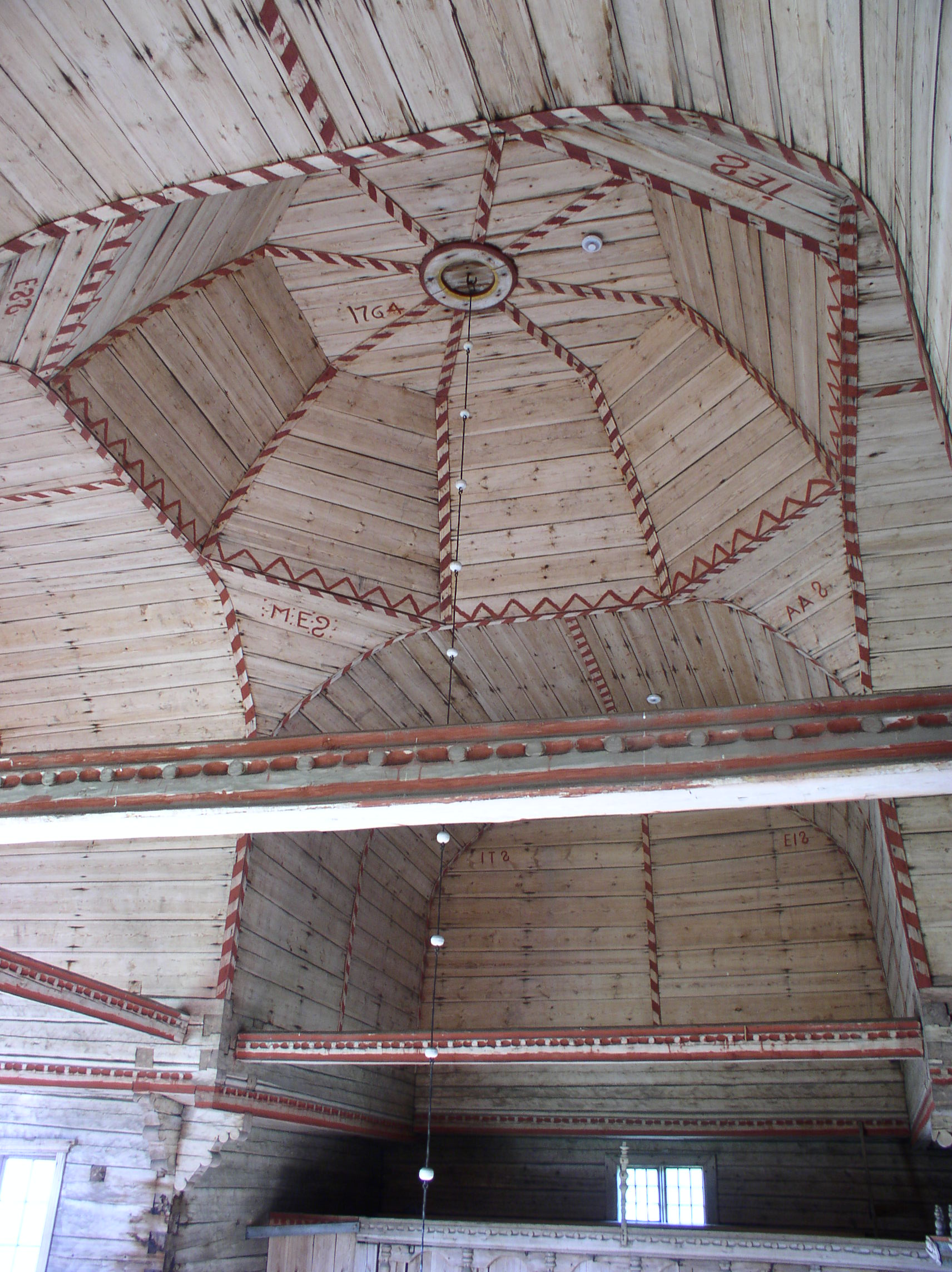
There are influences from the vaults of stone churches in the forms and decorative paintings of the ceiling

== From forgotten to world heritage ==
After the new church was built, the old remained abandoned for a long time. Only the cemetery around the church and the belltower were in use. In the 1920s a Polish-Austrian art historian Josef Strzygowski noticed the architectural and historical value of the church and since 1929 it has been restored several times. In 1994 it was approved in the UNESCO's World Heritage Sites representing typical eastern Scandinavian wooden church tradition.
