= Ala-Kintaus =

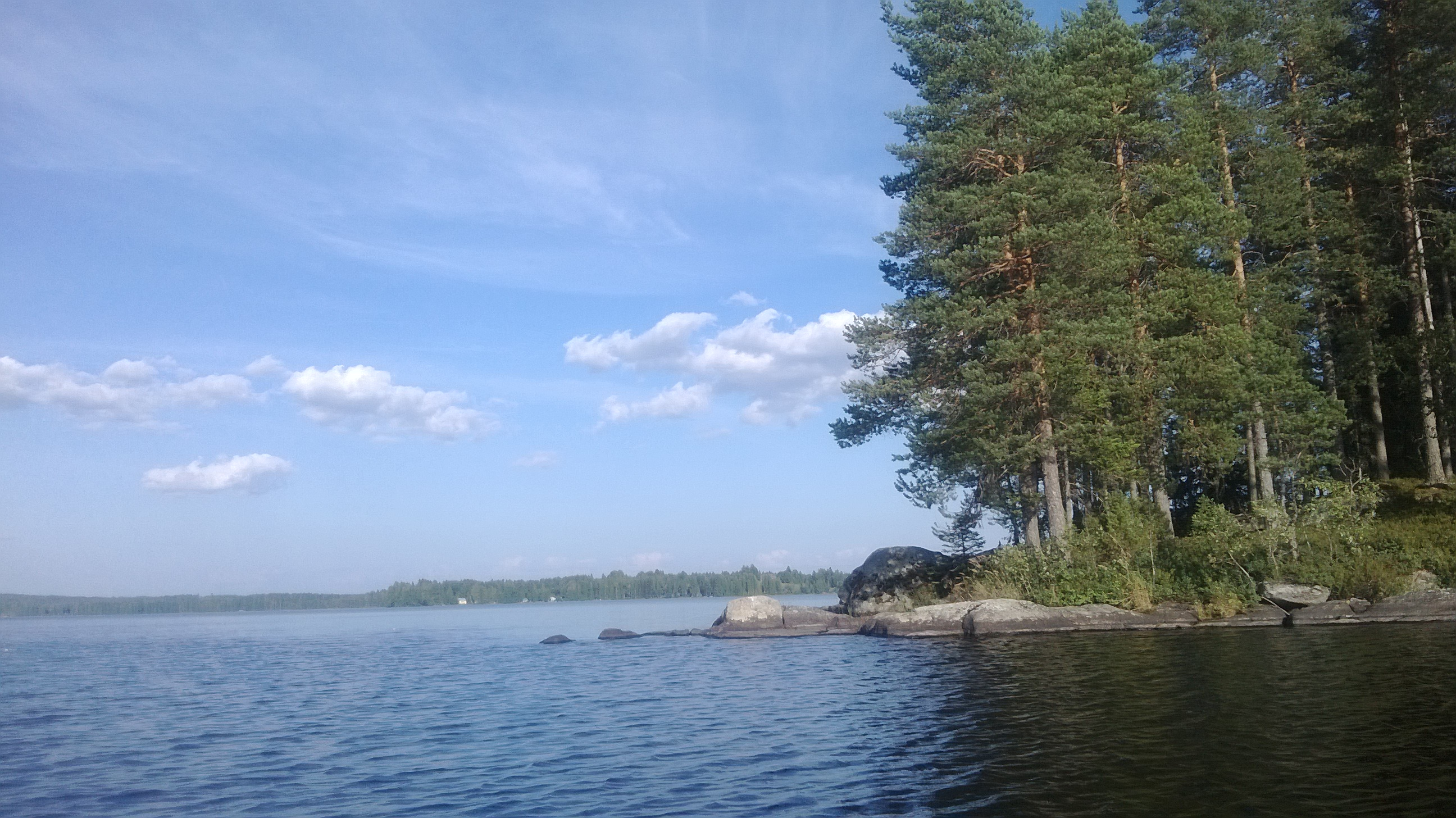

- Location within Finland
- Location: Petäjävesi
- Coordinates: 62°17′N 025°21′E
- Type: Lake
- Primary outflows: Könkköjoki
- Catchment area: Kymijoki
- Basin countries: Finland
- Surface area: 7.218 km^{2} (2.787 sq mi)
- Average depth: 5.24 m (17.2 ft)
- Max. depth: 19 m (62 ft)
- Water volume: 0.0378 km^{3} (30,600 acre⋅ft)
- Shore length^{1}: 30.29 km (18.82 mi)
- Surface elevation: 154.4 m (507 ft)
- Islands: Räihänsaari, Kuoliosaari, Ellilänsaari
- Settlements: Kintaus
- ^{1} Shore length is not a well-defined measure.

Ala-Kintaus is a rather small lake of Finland. It belongs to the Kymijoki main catchment area. It is located in Petäjävesi municipality in Central Finland. It is a part of Jämsä catchment area.

== See also ==
- List of lakes in Finland
