= Petäjävesi =

- Municipality
- Petäjäveden kunta Petäjävesi kommun
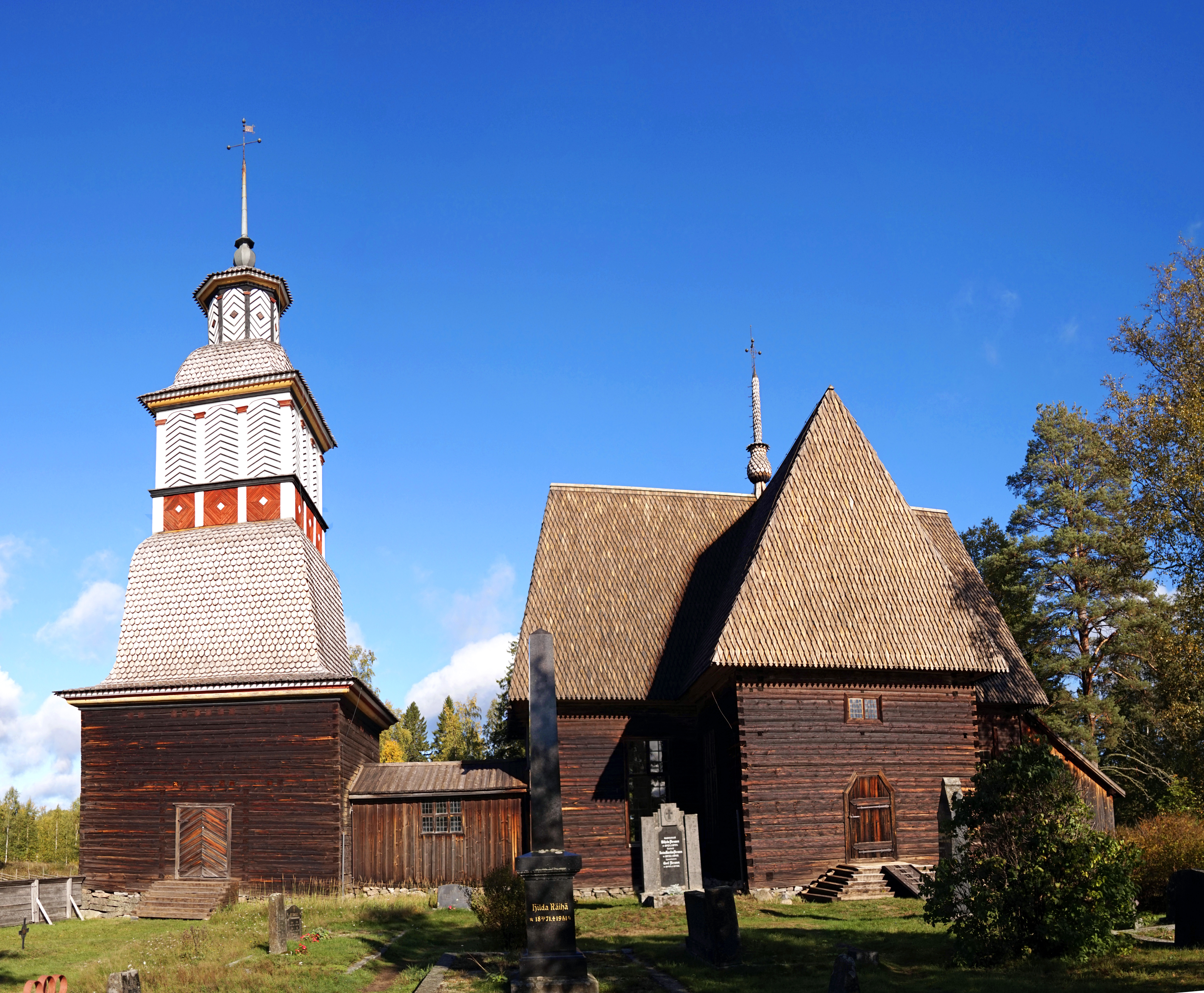
- Petäjävesi Old Church

- Coat of arms

- Location of Petäjävesi in Finland
- Interactive map of Petäjävesi
- Coordinates: 62°15.5′N 025°11′E
- Country: Finland
- Region: Central Finland
- Sub-region: Jyväskylä
- Charter: 1868

Government
  - Municipal manager: Markku Rautiainen

Area (2018-01-01)
  - Total: 495.41 km^{2} (191.28 sq mi)
  - Land: 456.42 km^{2} (176.22 sq mi)
  - Water: 39.01 km^{2} (15.06 sq mi)
  - Rank: 192nd largest in Finland

Population (2025-12-31)
  - Total: 3,511
  - Rank: 203rd largest in Finland
  - Density: 7.69/km^{2} (19.9/sq mi)

Population by native language
  - Finnish: 98.1% (official)
  - Others: 1.9%

Population by age
  - 0 to 14: 18.9%
  - 15 to 64: 56.3%
  - 65 or older: 24.8%
- Time zone: UTC+02:00 (EET)
  - Summer (DST): UTC+03:00 (EEST)
- Website: www.petajavesi.fi

Petäjävesi (Finnish pronunciation: [ˈpetæjæˌʋesi]; lit. "pine water") is a municipality of Finland. It is located in the province of Western Finland, next to the city of Jyväskylä, and is part of the Central Finland region. The municipality has a population of 3,511 (31 December 2025) and covers an area of 495.41 square kilometres (191.28 sq mi) of which 39.01 km^{2} (15.06 sq mi), or almost 8%, is water. The population density is 7.69 inhabitants per square kilometre (19.9/sq mi).

Neighbouring municipalities are Jyväskylä, Jämsä, Keuruu, Multia and Uurainen.

The municipality is unilingually Finnish.

The Petäjävesi Old Church, was listed as a UNESCO World Heritage Site in 1994 for its testimony to Nordic church architecture.

== Geography ==
=== Nature ===
There are all together 99 lakes in Petäjävesi. The biggest lakes are Jämsänvesi–Petäjävesi, Ala-Kintaus and Ylä-Kintaus. Karikkoselkä is a lake in Petäjävesi, which is formed by a meteorite.

The Karikkoselkä impact crater is located southeast of the municipal centre.

=== Population ===
As of 31 December 2023, there were 3,596 people living in Petäjävesi, of whom 3,596 lived in urban areas (taajama), 1,534 lived outside them and 58 lived in an unknown location. There were two urban areas in the municipality: Petäjäveden kirkonkylä (administrative centre, 1,738) and Kintaus (266).

The municipality comprises the following villages:

- Heikkilänperä
- Jussilanperä
- Karikonkylä
- Kintaus
- Kuitula
- Kuivasmäki
- Kukkaro
- Kumpu
- Liisalanperä
- Metsäkulma
- Pengerjoki
- Piesaskylä
- Töysänperä
- Urrianperä
- Ylä-Kintaus

== History ==
The municipality is named after the village of Petäjävesi (Petäjäveden kirkonkylä), which in turn is named after lake Petäjävesi, lit. 'pine water' (i.e. 'pine lake', compare Leppävesi and Pihlajavesi). Originally part of Jämsä, the area became a subordinate parish under it in 1728 as Kuivasmäki. It became an independent parish under the name Petäjävesi in 1867.

== Notable people ==
- Mika Aaltola (1969–), Finnish political scientist
- Jarmo Kytölehto (1961–), Finnish rally driver
- Frans Lehtonen (1859–1920), Finnish politician
- Olavi Tupamäki (1944–), Finnish engineer and politician

== Gallery ==
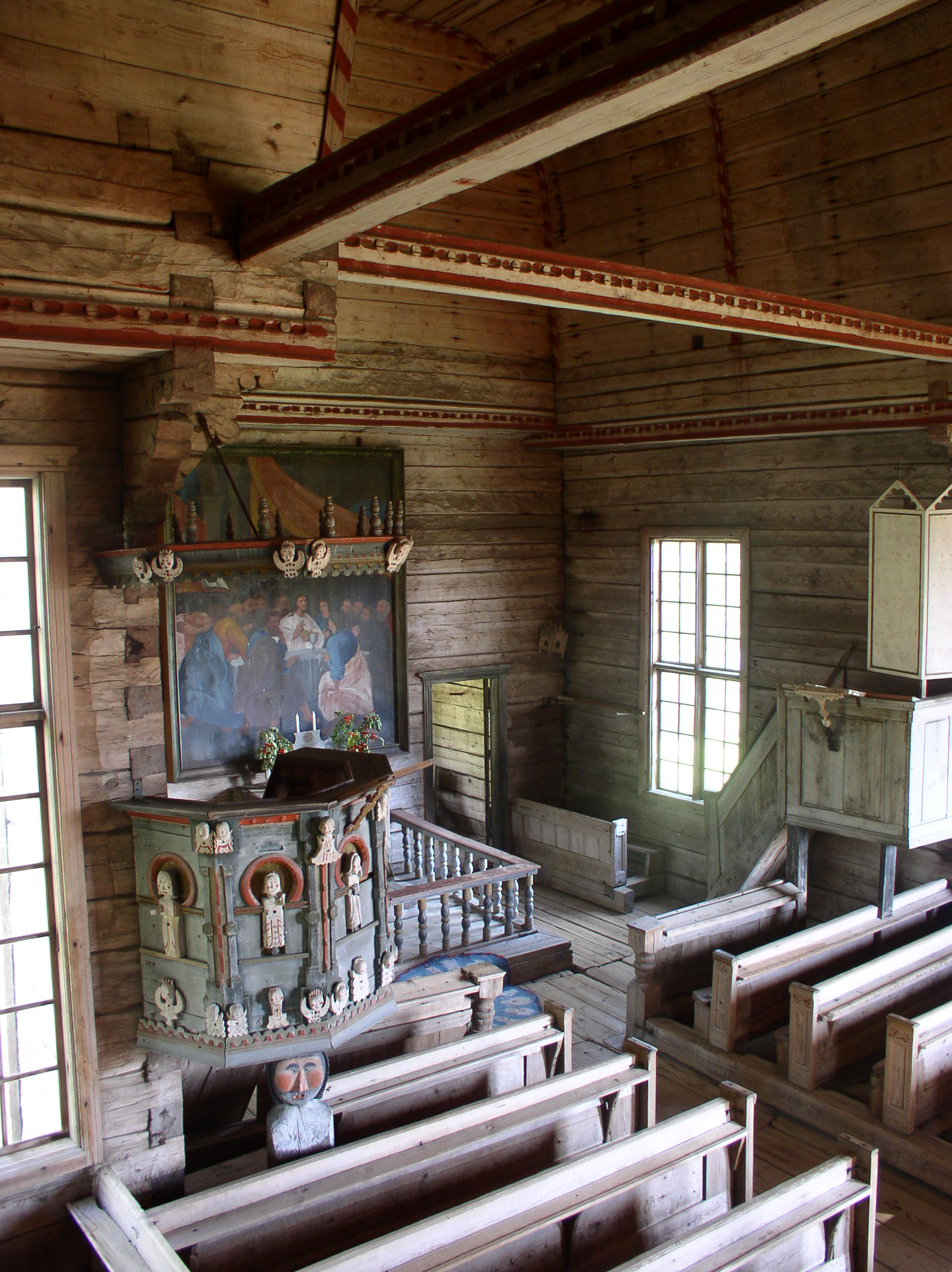
Petäjävesi Old Church interior

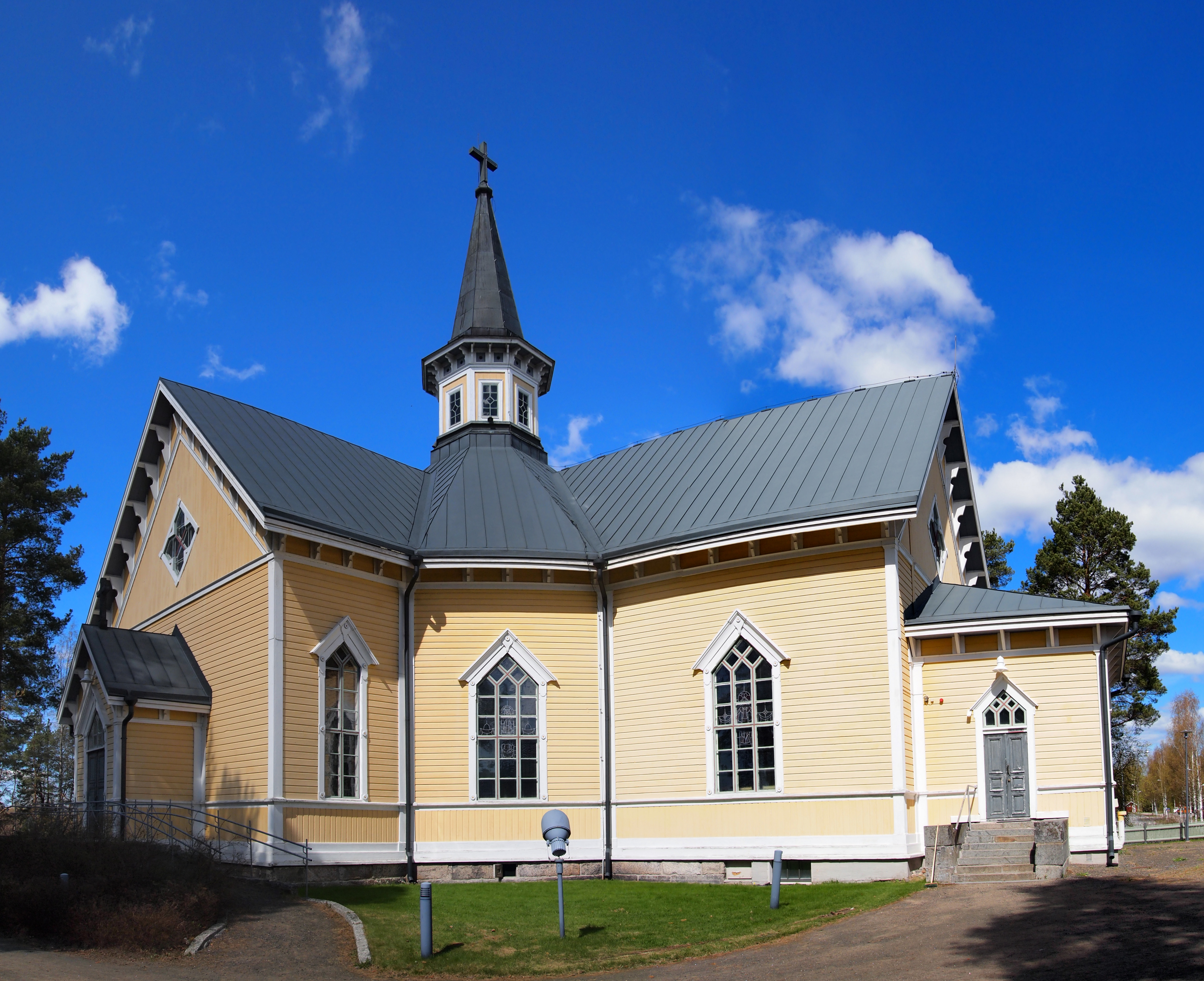
Petäjävesi New Church

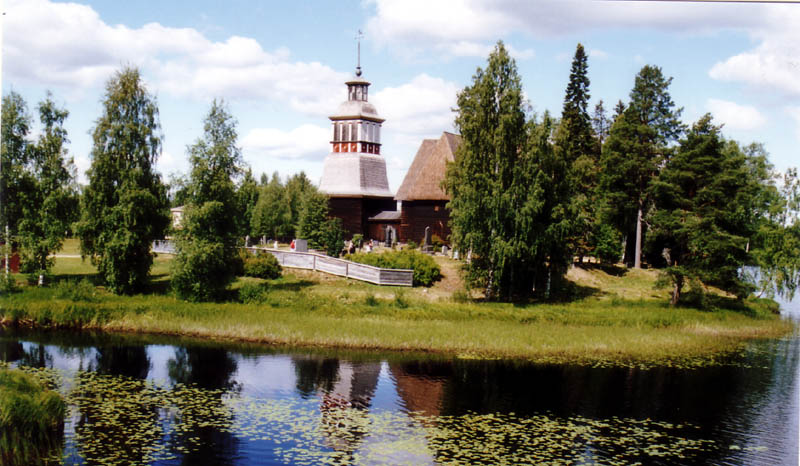
Petäjävesi Old Church

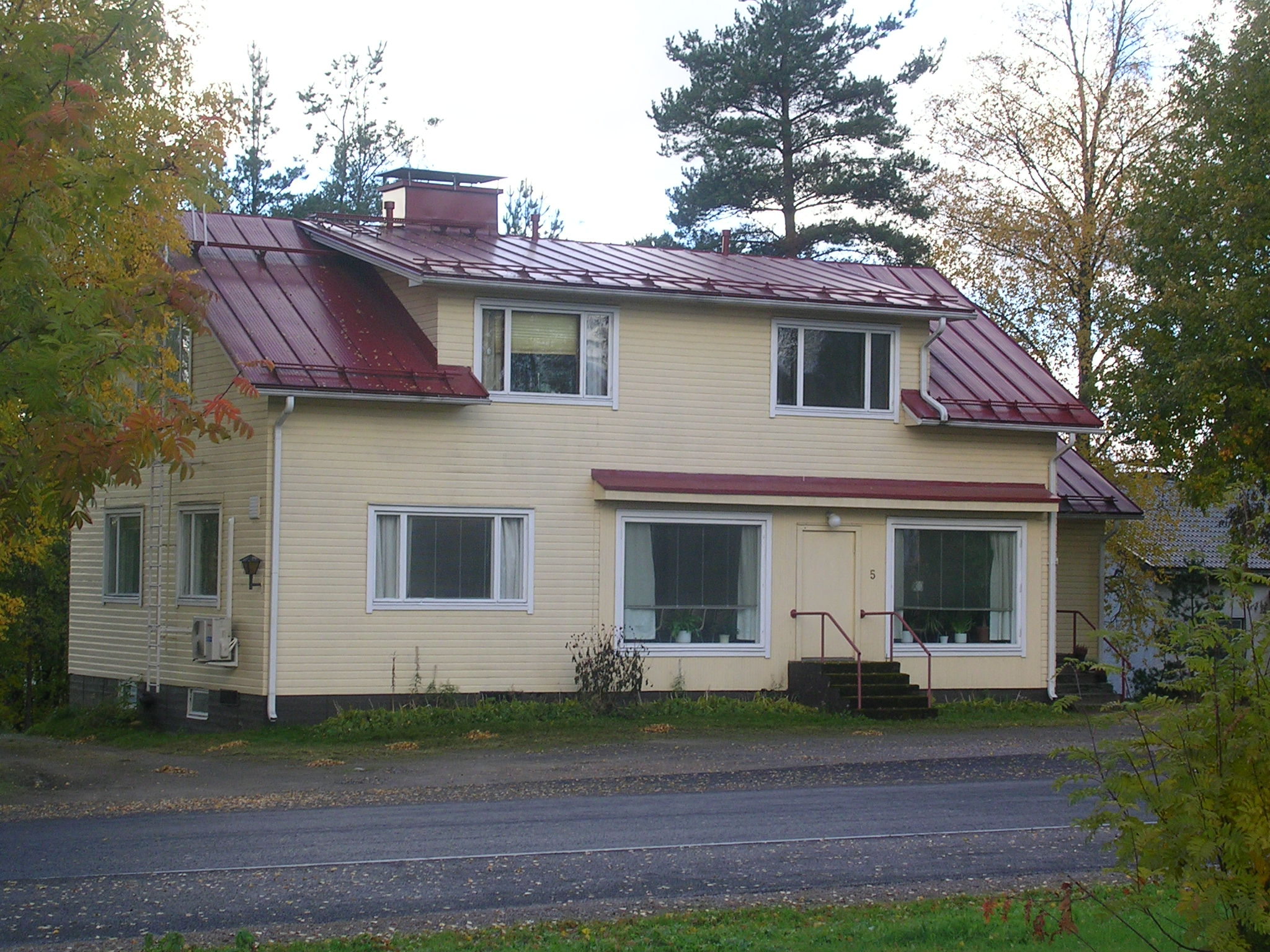
Petäjävesi Baptist Church
