= Multia =

- Municipality
- Multian kunta Multia kommun
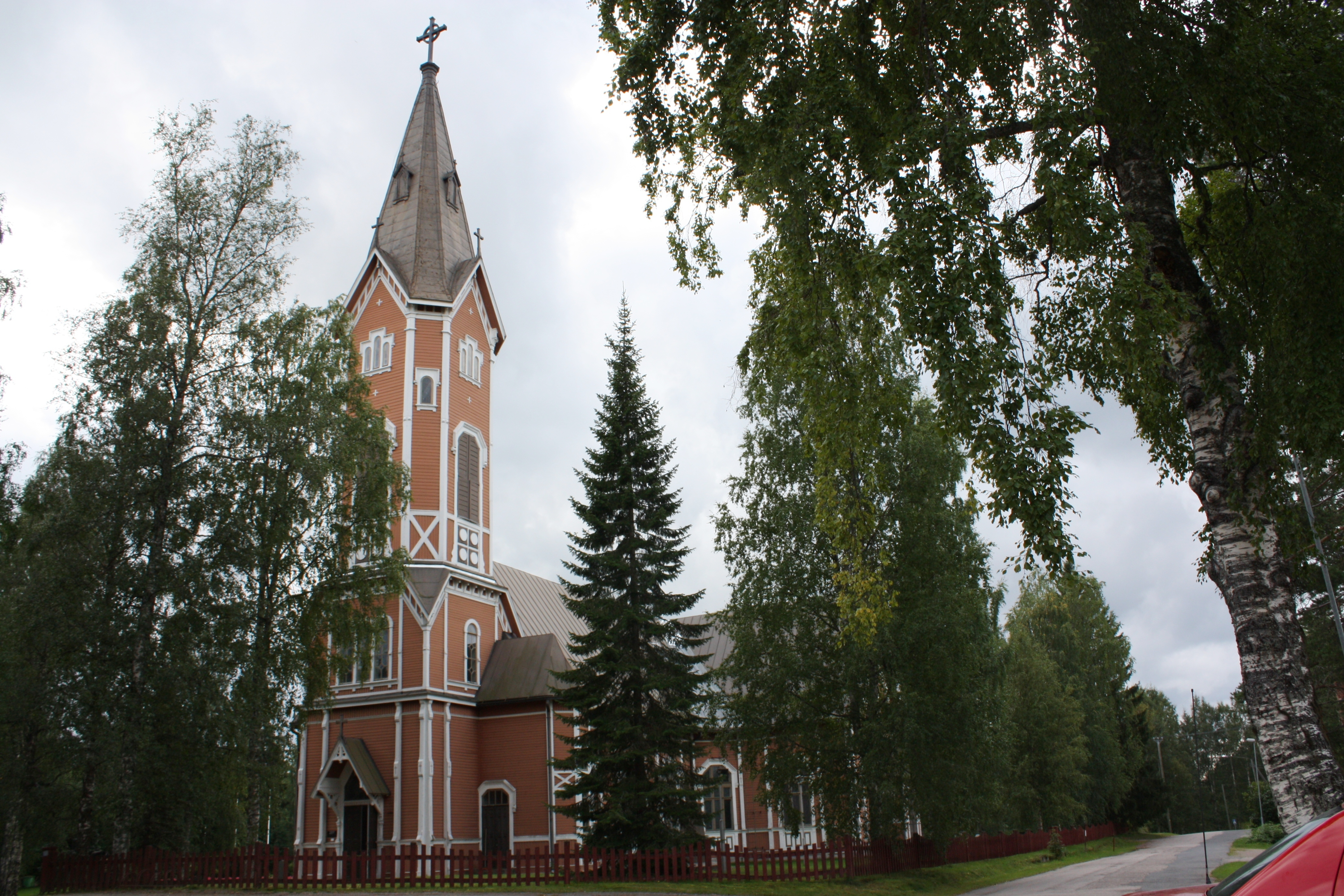
- Multia Church

- Coat of arms

- Location of Multia in Finland
- Interactive map of Multia
- Coordinates: 62°24.5′N 024°47.7′E
- Country: Finland
- Region: Central Finland
- Sub-region: Keuruu sub-region
- Charter: 1868

Government
  - Municipal manager: Arto Kummala

Area (2018-01-01)
  - Total: 765.63 km^{2} (295.61 sq mi)
  - Land: 733.25 km^{2} (283.11 sq mi)
  - Water: 32.37 km^{2} (12.50 sq mi)
  - Rank: 116th largest in Finland

Population (2025-12-31)
  - Total: 1,386
  - Rank: 280th largest in Finland
  - Density: 1.89/km^{2} (4.9/sq mi)

Population by native language
  - Finnish: 97.7% (official)
  - Others: 2.3%

Population by age
  - 0 to 14: 13.7%
  - 15 to 64: 50.6%
  - 65 or older: 35.6%
- Time zone: UTC+02:00 (EET)
  - Summer (DST): UTC+03:00 (EEST)
- Website: multia.fi

Multia is a municipality of Finland. It is located in the Central Finland region. The municipality has a population of 1,386 (31 December 2025) and covers an area of 765.63 square kilometres (295.61 sq mi) of which 32.37 km^{2} (12.50 sq mi), or 11.5%, is water. The population density is 1.89 inhabitants per square kilometre (4.9/sq mi).

The municipality is unilingually Finnish. The municipality has previously also been known as "Muldia" in Swedish documents, but is today referred to as "Multia" also in Swedish.

== Geography ==
Neighbouring municipalities are Keuruu, Petäjävesi, Saarijärvi, Uurainen and Ähtäri. Multia is 60 kilometres (37 mi) from Jyväskylä, the capital city of Central Finland.

There are altogether 146 lakes in Multia. The biggest lakes in Multia are Sinervä, Tarhapäänjärvi and Sahrajärvi-Pienvesi.

The highest point of the Central Finland region, Kiiskilänmäki, which reaches an altitude of 269 metres (883 ft) above sea level, is located in Multia.

During the summer months (June - August), Multia is the rainiest municipality in Finland, with an average of 237.3 millimeters (9.3 inches) of rainfall.

Climate data for Multia Pirttiperä (1991-2020 normals)
Month	Jan	Feb	Mar	Apr	May	Jun	Jul	Aug	Sep	Oct	Nov	Dec	Year
Average precipitation mm (inches)	55 (2.2)	43 (1.7)	42 (1.7)	39 (1.5)	45 (1.8)	73 (2.9)	89 (3.5)	79 (3.1)	65 (2.6)	73 (2.9)	67 (2.6)	65 (2.6)	735 (28.9)
Average precipitation days (≥ 0.1 mm)	21	18	16	12	13	15	15	15	15	19	21	23	203
Source: https://www.ilmatieteenlaitos.fi/1991-2020-sadetilastot

== Events ==
Kicksled World Championship

== Notable people ==
- Seth Heikkilä (1863–1938)
- Tauno Sipilä (1921–2001)
- Pentti Papinaho (1926-1992)
- Erkki Pohjanheimo (born 1942)
