= Äänekosken maalaiskunta =

- Former municipality
- Äänekosken maalaiskunta Äänekoski landskommun
- Coat of arms

- Location of Äänekosken mlk in Finland
- Coordinates: 62.5706501°N 25.6539417°E
- Country: Finland
- Region: Central Finland
- Established: 1911
- Merged into Äänekoski: 1969
- Seat: Honkola

Area
  - Land: 266.2 km^{2} (102.8 sq mi)

Population (1968-12-31)
  - Total: 2,941

Äänekosken maalaiskunta (abbreviated as Äänekosken mlk, Swedish: Äänekoski landskommun) is a former municipality of Finland in the Central Finland region. It was consolidated with the kauppala of Äänekoski in 1969.

It bordered Äänekoski, Suolahti, Laukaa, Uurainen, Saarijärvi, Konginkangas and Sumiainen.

== Geography ==
=== Lakes ===
The Keitele and Pyhäjärvi are partially within the borders of the former municipality.

== History ==
Municipalities merged into Äänekoski, Äänekosken mlk in the west

The toponym Äänekoski was first mentioned in 1455 as Ænækoski laxefiskeri (Swedish for "salmon fishery on the Äänekoski rapids"). According to Terho Itkonen, the name of the rapids is of Sámi origin, having been derived from a word meaning "big, large" (compare Northern Sámi eanas, "most").

Folk etymology connects the name to the word ääni, "sound": as the first Savonian settlers came to the area, they heard the loud sound of the rapids and called it Eänekkoski in their Savonian dialect.

Before 1628, the area was a part of the Rautalampi parish, after which it was a part of the Laukaa parish. In the 18th and 19th centuries, the village of Koivisto was a minor local center as many important roads went through it, including a road connecting Vaasa to Kuopio. The oldest post office in Central Finland was located in Koivisto. In the 1820s, Hirvaskangas was the only place in Northern Tavastia (roughly corresponding to Central Finland) where markets were held.

The Äänekoski parish was formed in 1907 from parts of the Laukaa parish. The municipality Äänekosken maalaiskunta was formed in 1911 from parts of Laukaa and Saarijärvi. At that time the municipality was known simply as Äänekoski.

In 1932, the actual settlement of Äänekoski, along with Suolahti, were split off as their own municipalities. The old municipality of Äänekoski was renamed Äänekosken maalaiskunta, "rural municipality of Äänekoski", while its administrative center was moved to the village of Honkola. Äänekoski and Äänekosken mlk had a shared parish, while Suolahti was given a separate parish in 1946.

The municipality was consolidated with Äänekoski in 1969.

== Roads ==
The national road 4 goes through the former municipality. The smaller national road 69 starts in Hirvaskangas, goes through Konnevesi and Rautalampi and ends in the village of Levä in Suonenjoki.

== Sights ==
Venäläiskivi is a memorial for a battle in Koivisto during the Finnish War of 1808–1809. The memorial is a boulder with a metal plaque, and it is protected by the Finnish Heritage Agency. According to oral tradition, dead Russian soldiers are buried under the boulder.

In Kapeenkylä near the Kapeenkoski rapids, there is a kettle hole called Ristinhauta that has been used as a sacrificial site by pagans. Once Christianity spread to the area, it became a site of Christian worship used by travelers in the 16th century. Priests from Sysmä held sermons by it.
