= Central Finland Province =

Province of Finland (1960–1997)

Central Finland Province Keski-Suomen lääni Mellersta Finlands län
- Province of Finland
- 1960–1997
- Coat of arms
- Capital: Jyväskylä
- Area
  - 1 January 1993: 19,388 km^{2} (7,486 sq mi)
- Population
  - 1 January 1993: 255,989
- History
  - Established: 1960
  - Disestablished: 1997
| Preceded by | Succeeded by |
| Province of Vaasa | Western Finland |

The Central Finland Province (Finnish: Keski-Suomen lääni, Swedish: Mellersta Finlands län) was a province of Finland from 1960 to 1997. The area of the Central Finland Province was the same as the area of Central Finland region.

The Central Finland Province was established in 1960 when it was separated from the Vaasa Province. Minor parts of Häme Province, Kuopio Province and Mikkeli Province were also merged to the new province. In 1997 it was reunited with Vaasa and together with the northern part of the Häme Province and the Turku and Pori Province it was merged into the new Western Finland Province.

== Maps ==
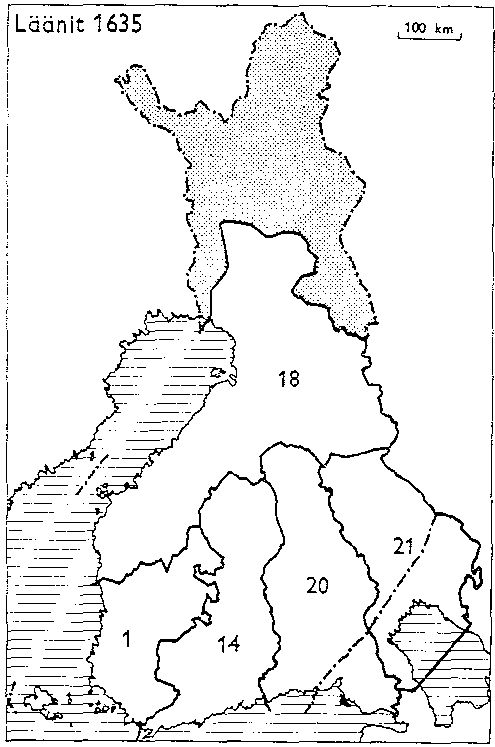
Provinces of Finland 1634: 1: Turku and Pori, 14: Nyland and Tavastehus, 18: Ostrobothnia, 20: Viborg and Nyslott, 21: Kexholm

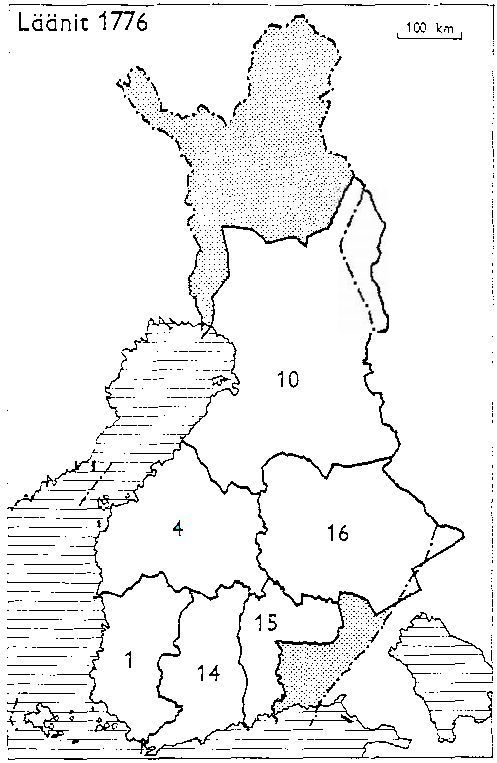
Provinces of Finland 1776: 1: Turku and Pori, 4: Vaasa, 10: Oulu, 14: Nyland and Tavastehus, 15: Kymmenegård, 16: Savolax and Karelia

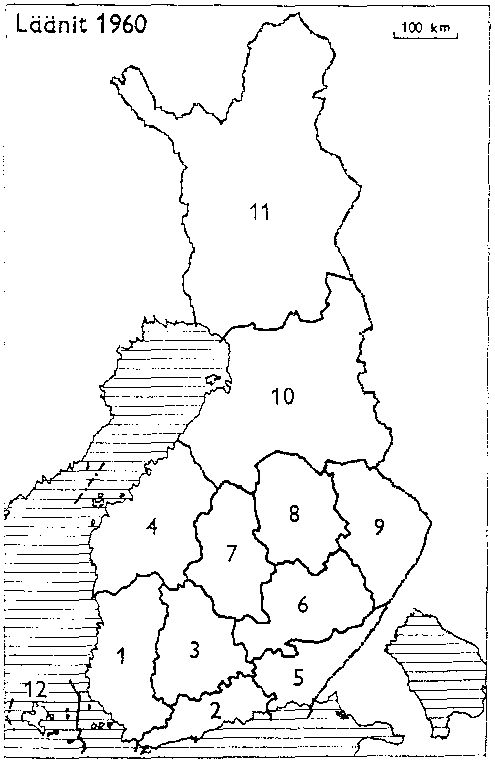
Provinces of Finland 1960: 1: Turku and Pori, 2: Uusimaa, 3: Häme, 4: Vaasa, 5: Kymi, 6: Mikkeli, 7: Central Finland, 8: Kuopio, 9: Northern Karelia, 10: Oulu, 11: Lapland, 12: Åland

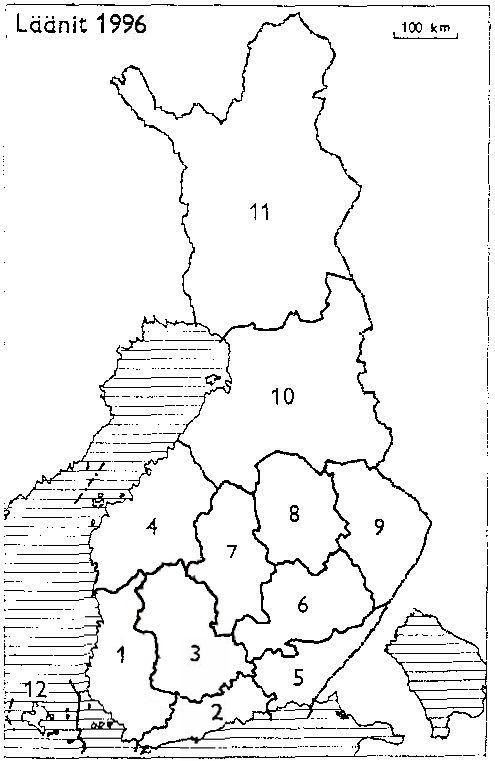
Provinces of Finland 1996: 1: Turku and Pori, 2: Uusimaa, 3: Häme, 4: Vaasa, 5: Kymi, 6: Mikkeli, 7: Central Finland, 8: Kuopio, 9: Northern Karelia, 10: Oulu, 11: Lapland, 12: Åland

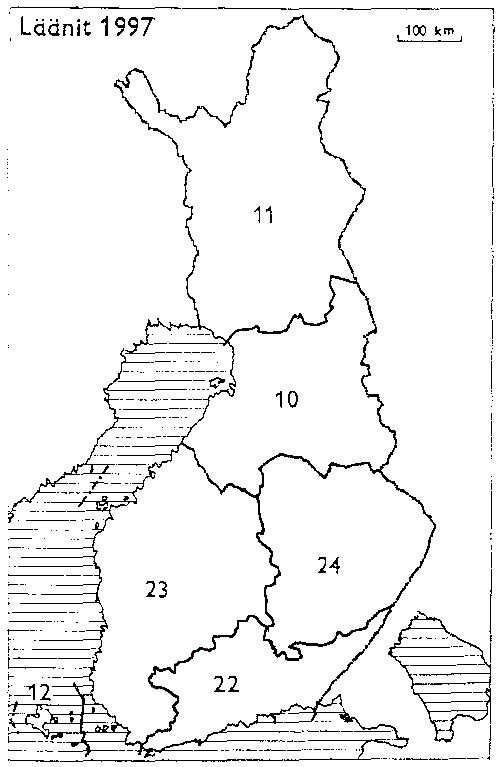
Provinces of Finland 1997: 10: Oulu, 11: Lapland, 12: Åland, 22: Southern Finland, 23: Western Finland, 24: Eastern Finland

== Municipalities in 1997 (cities in bold) ==
- Hankasalmi
- Joutsa
- **Jyväskylä**
- Jyväskylän mlk
- **Jämsä**
- **Jämsänkoski**
- Kannonkoski
- Karstula
- **Keuruu**
- Kinnula
- Kivijärvi
- Konnevesi
- Korpilahti
- Kuhmoinen
- Kyyjärvi
- Laukaa
- Leivonmäki
- Luhanka
- Multia
- Muurame
- Petäjävesi
- Pihtipudas
- Pylkönmäki
- **Saarijärvi**
- Sumiainen
- **Suolahti**
- Toivakka
- Uurainen
- **Viitasaari**
- **Äänekoski**

== Former municipalities (disestablished before 1997) ==
- Konginkangas
- Koskenpää
- Pihlajavesi
- Säynätsalo
- Äänekosken mlk

== Governors ==
- Eino Palovesi 1960–1972
- Artturi Jämsén 1972–1976
- Kauko Sipponen 1976–1985
- Kalevi Kivistö 1985–1997
