= Koskenlaskija =

Finnish cheese

Koskenlaskija (Finnish for "raftsman") is a Finnish brand of processed cheese produced by Valio. Production of Koskenlaskija started in Helsinki in 1933, and it was Valio's first brand of processed cheese. Koskenlaskija has also been produced in Lahti (1940-1967), in Tampere (1967-1989) and currently in Vaarala, Vantaa. Koskenlaskija is the most popular brand of processed cheese in Finland. Koskenlaskija is a registered trademark by Valio.

The cheese master Mauritz Artur Katajisto (1900-1979) received a personal award at a cheese exhibition in Helsinki in 1947 for developing Koskenlaskija.

Throughout the decades, Koskenlaskija cheese has remained almost unchanged. The current product line also includes spreadable and sliced versions. In additional to the traditional flavour, Koskenlaskija is now available in a more intense flavour and in spiced flavours (cold-smoked reindeer, green pepper, bell pepper and herb-garlic).

The packaging of the product has remained mostly unchanged, with the label featuring a log driver navigating down a rapid. The original 250 g package was designed by Veikko Emil Sipinen, and the appearance has been only slightly modernised.

In 2015 Koskenlaskija was chosen as the third most popular brand of cheese in Finland in an annual brand survey conducted by Markkinointi & Mainonta and Taloustutkimus. The most popular cheese was Aura—another Valio cheese—and the second most popular cheese was Oltermanni.

== Wartime ==
Extensive production of block processed cheese was started in Finland during wartime. 500 g packages of Koskenlaskija cheese were used as part of the five-day field rations of frontline patrols during the Continuation War.

In the Syväri forest after a battle: We, a bunch of new recruits born in 1923 and drafted to the frontline had ended up in a difficult situation, when the Russians were making a huge spring attack in Syväri from Homoravitsa. It was 1942. After a hard battle, we survivors were dealt whatever food was available and so it was a package of Koskenlaskija cheese for each man. We probably had not eaten for a whole day and we were hungry... This is associated with my first war experience and a package of Koskenlaskija cheese so strongly, that whenever I see a package of Koskenlaskija cheese at a shop shelf - I relive that period. After all, since I survived that trip, I had to go out and buy a package of Koskenlaskija cheese and taste it to see if it had the same flavour as back then. And yes, it had.
