= Konginkangas =

Former municipality in Finland

- Former municipality
- Konginkankaan kunta Konginkangas kommun
- Coat of arms

- Location of Konginkangas in Finland
- Coordinates: 62°46′45″N 025°48′23″E
- Country: Finland
- Region: Central Finland
- Established: 1895
- Merged into Äänekoski: 1993
- Seat: Konginkankaan kirkonkylä

Area
  - Land: 298.6 km^{2} (115.3 sq mi)
  - Water: 100 km^{2} (39 sq mi)

Population (2017)
  - Total: 1,350

Konginkangas is a settlement and former municipality of Finland in the Central Finland region. It was consolidated with Äänekoski in 1993.

The municipality bordered Äänekoski, Saarijärvi, Kannonkoski, Viitasaari, Vesanto, Konnevesi and Sumiainen. Until 1969, it bordered Äänekosken maalaiskunta instead of Äänekoski. The national road 4 goes through Konginkangas and the distance between Äänekoski proper and Konginkangas is about 20 km.

== Geography ==
=== Villages ===
- Konginkangas or Konginkankaan kirkonkylä
- Riihilahti (~10 permanently inhabited houses)
- Liimattala (~400 residents)
- Laajaranta (~50 houses)
- Räihä
- Kalaniemi

The area of the former municipality also has many summer houses.

=== Lakes ===
Konginkangas is located by the large lake Keitele. Smaller lakes include Rahkojärvi, Särkilampi, Ahvenlampi and Lekojärvi.

== History ==
=== Name ===
Konginkangas is named after the oldest farm in the area, named after the nearby terrain (kangas, a type of forest). The kongin- element is unclear, but possibly related to the dialectal word konkale, "big tree". Alternatively it comes from the name of the settler Pietari Heikinpoika Konkki, where Konkki refers to the Konkkila farm in Pälkäne.

Other toponyms with the kongin- element can be found elsewhere in Finland, for example Konginniemi in Kiuruvesi.

=== Early history ===
Tavastian people used the area as hunting grounds in the 9th century, but did not settle there permanently.

Konginkangas was first mentioned in 1561 as Kånckinkas. At the time it was a part of the large Rautalampi parish. It was originally the name of a farm owned by Lauri Leinonen, who originated from either Savonia or Messukylä. Most settlers in the area were Savonian people. When the Viitasaari parish was separated from Rautalampi in 1635, Konginkangas was included in it.

==== Liimattala ====
The village of Liimattala was also established in the late 16th century. It was originally known as Pyyrinlahti, while Liimattala was the name of the first farm in the area. Liimattala was never a part of Viitasaari, but a village within the Saarijärvi parish instead.

During the Cudgel War, a battle took place on the Kurikkaharju near Liimattala in December 1596. The peasants of Lapua, Lappajärvi, Kivijärvi, Karstula and Saarijärvi managed to defeat their enemies here.

Pyyrinlahti was Saarijärvi's wealthiest village in the 17th century. Court meetings for Saarijärvi and Viitasaari were held at the lands of the Liimattala farm. The name Liimattala has been used for the village at least since 1788.

=== Separation ===
Konginkangas became a chapel community in 1867. Parts of the chapel community were also taken from the Saarijärvi parish to the west. The chapel community was also called Kömi, as the church was built on the lands of the farm of the same name. The Kömi farm was first mentioned in 1744.

In 1866, the Konginkangas church was built. It was designed by Jaakko Kuorikoski. Building a large church was challenging at the time, as Konginkangas only had 32 houses. The church was renovated between 1898 and 1899. The church has room for 550 people.

Konginkangas became a separate parish and municipality in 1895, though the municipal government was selected earlier in April 18, 1868.

=== Merger ===
In 1991, the people of Konginkangas voted whether they wanted their municipality to join Äänekoski or not. 79,6% of eligible voters turned up and 53% voted against the merger. Despite this, Konginkangas was consolidated with Äänekoski in 1993. Owing to its distance from Äänekoski, the villages of Konginkangas still have a separate identity from Äänekoski today.

== Education ==
The first public primary school (kansakoulu) in Central Finland was established in Konginkangas in the year 1867. A new wooden school, nowadays acting as a daycare, was established nearby in 1936. The current school is a brick building from the 70s, covering grades 1-6 (alakoulu).

== In culture ==
Akseli Gallen-Kallela has made paintings about Konginkangas, among them Keitele, painted in 1904–1905. Said painting has four different versions, one of which is held in the National Gallery of London.

Niemelän torppa on Seurasaari in Helsinki consists of buildings relocated from Konginkangas.

== Notable people ==
- Mikko Niskanen, film director
