= Kapeenkoski =

Rapids in Äänekoski and Laukaa, Finland

Coordinates: 62°31′46″N 25°50′37″E

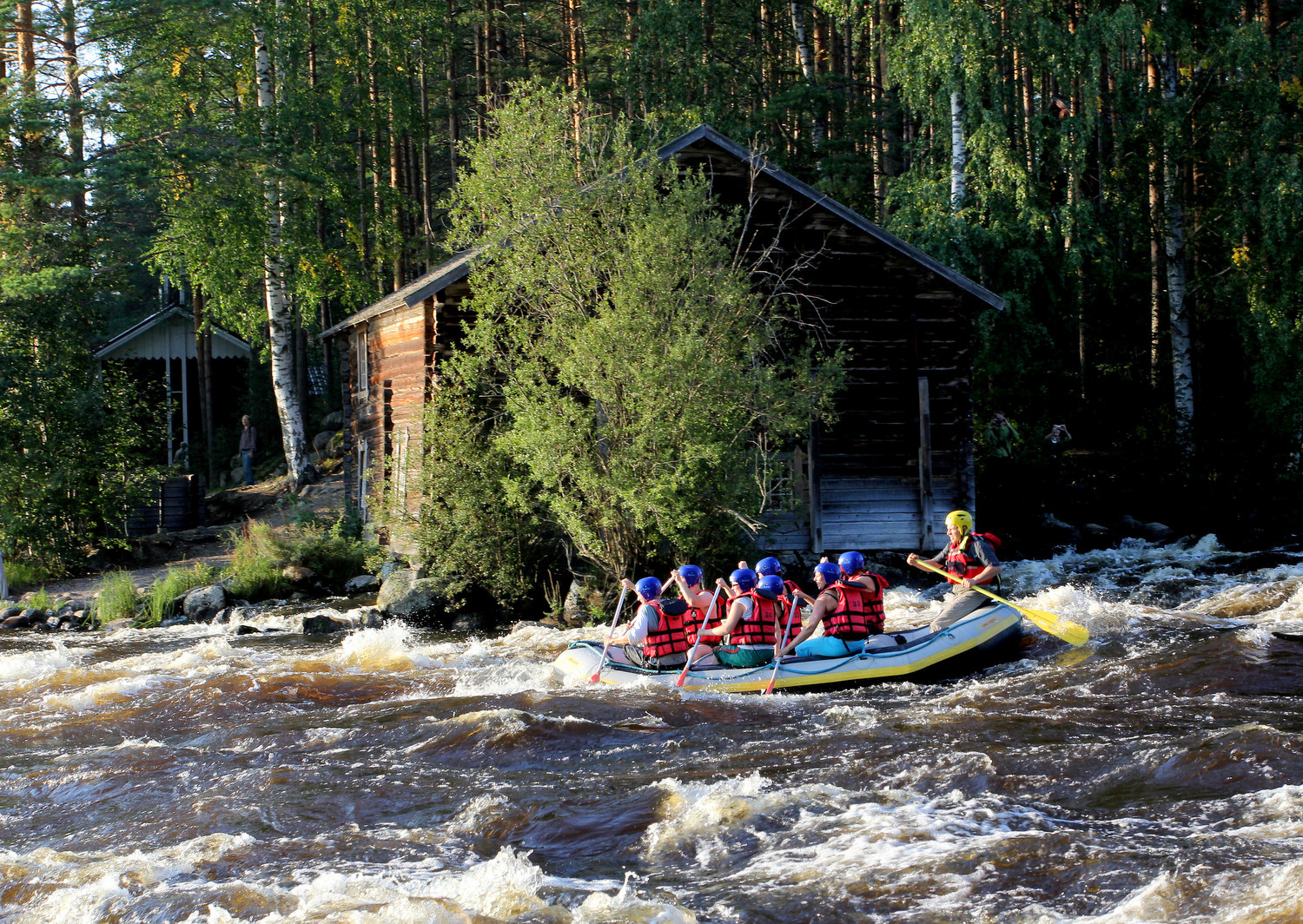
Old mill building and the rapids

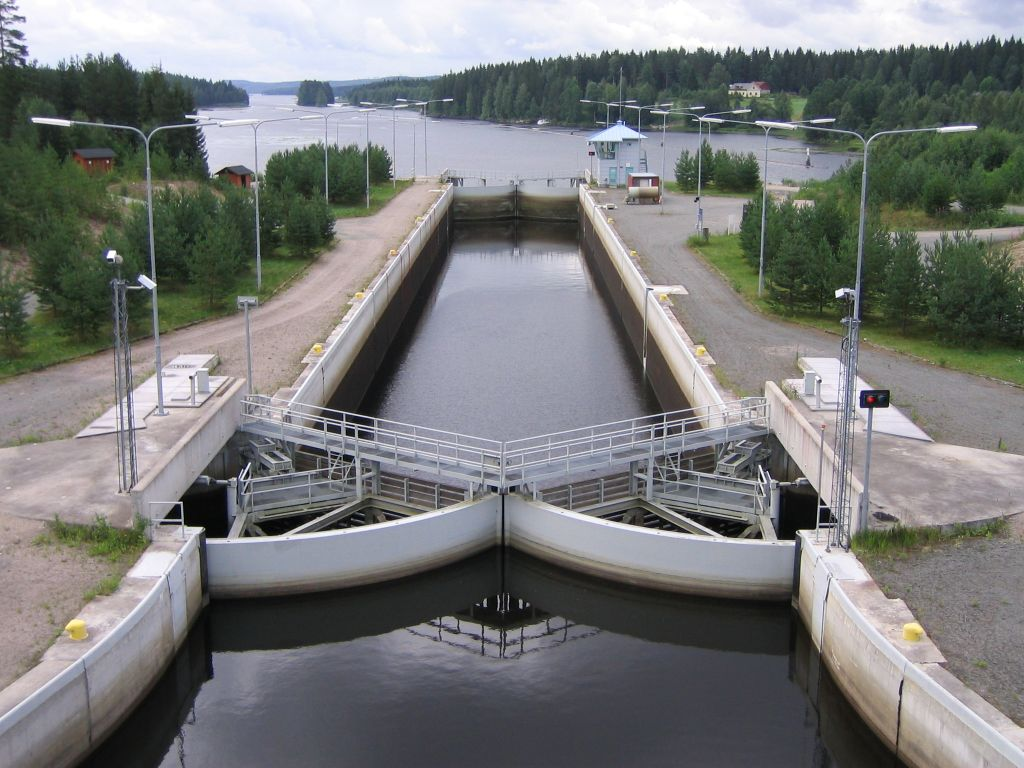
Kapeenkoski lock in Keitele Canal

Kapeenniemi a recreational area for the whole family and Kapeenkoski (meaning: Narrow rapids) a popular fishing rapids in Central Finland in an inspiring nature resort. The area is protected as the nature and wildlife are exceptionally rich and there are historical and prehistorical sites in the area. More info in Finnish http://www.aanekoski.fi/matkailijalle/nahtavyydet/kapeenniemen-virkistysalue/.

Kapeenkoski area (or just Kapee) is located along the waterway Keitele Canal between the Lake Kuhnamo and Lake Vatianjärvi, just on the border of municipalities of Äänekoski and Laukaa. The discharge on the rapid is 83 cubic metres per second (2,900 cu ft/s). Total elevation difference is 3 metres (10 ft).

The fishing ground consists of several rapids and the races between them. There is also a lock of the Keitele Canal in the area. There are other kinds of water sports available, too, e.g. white water kayaking.

For fishermen the lake trout is the most wanted catch in the rapid. The grayling population is growing as graylings have been planted in the rapids. Other fish caught in Kapeenkoski include ide, pike, and whitefish (powan).

Fishing packages and fishing permits for the independent fishermen are available in Kapeenkoski Ltd. Fishing permits for are sold for the Makasiinikoski, Luijankoski, and Kärmekoski rapids. Fishing permits and boats must be reserved in advance, preferably by email, see. Remember to get acquainted with the fishing rules and to pay the national fisheries management fee.

Kapeenniemi recreational area offers several short hiking paths, fire and camp fire sites free for all to use. The area managed by the Kapeenkoski Ltd is restricted to clients only. Fishers are welcome to use the Laani and Kattila camp fire sites (equipped with lean-tos) during the time of their permit. At both Kattila and Laani, you can hire a boat to cross the river.

For bird watchers, Kapeenkoski area offers year round opportunity. The water stays open all winter in Kapeenkoski where you can watch among others, white-throated dippers (Cinclus cinclus).
