= Aatunselkä =

Lake in Äänekoski, Finland

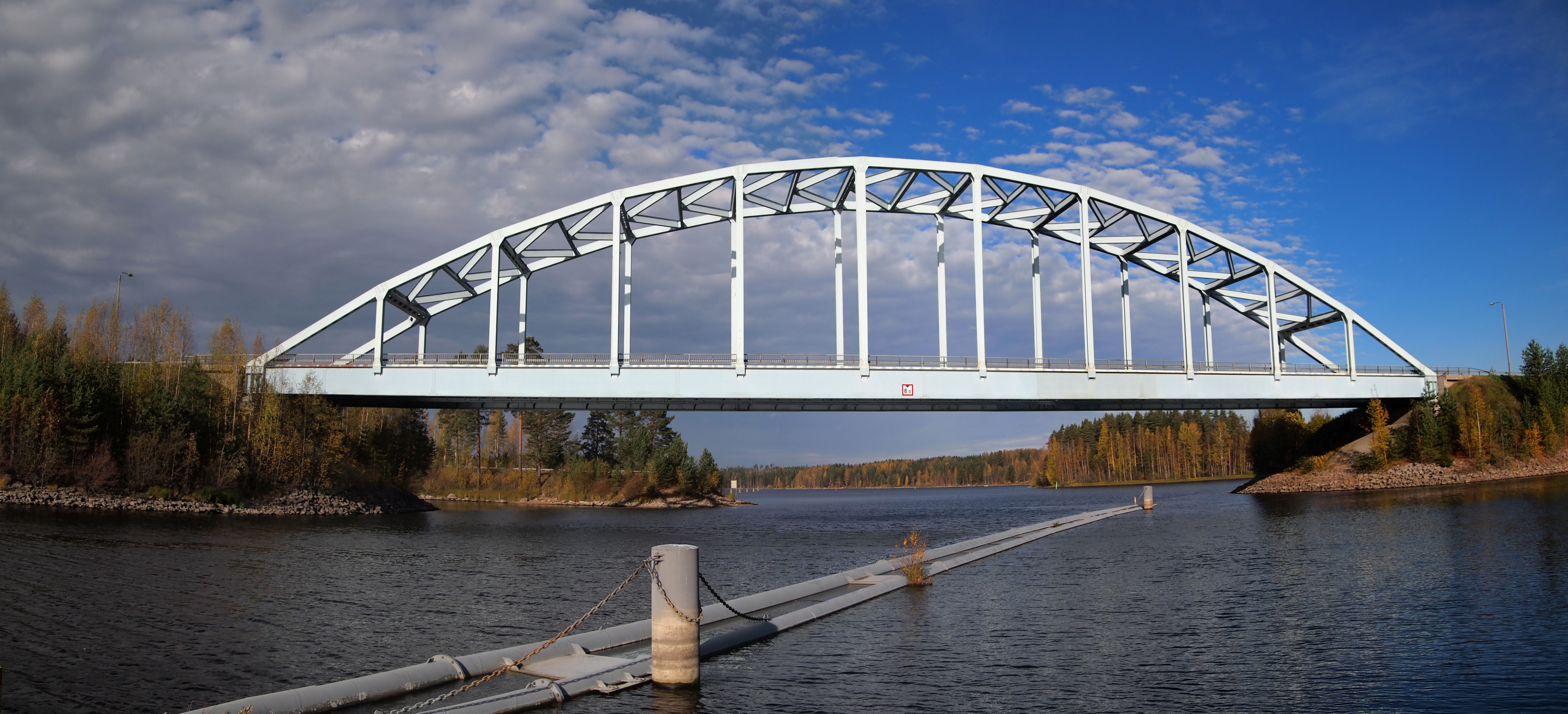
- Ison Pörri bridge

- Location within Central Finland Location within Finland
- Location: Äänekoski
- Coordinates: 62°32′42″N 25°49′08″E
- Basin countries: Finland
- Surface area: 1.11383 km^{2} (0.43005 sq mi)
- Water volume: 0.00464322 km^{3} (0.00111397 cu mi)
- Shore length^{1}: 10.41 km (6.47 mi)
- Surface elevation: 91.7 m (301 ft)
- Islands: Verkkosaari; Tuppisaari; Luijansaari
- ^{1} Shore length is not a well-defined measure.

Aatunselkä is a lake in the municipality of Äänekoski in the Central Finland Province in Finland.

== Details ==
The lake is 91.7 m above sea level. The area is 1.05 square km and the Coast is 10.41 km long. The lake is part of the Kymi (river)'s main catchment area. It is located about 33 km north of Jyväskylä and about 270 km north of Helsinki. In the lake there are the islands of Verkkosaari, Tuppisaari, Luijansaari. The lake is connected to Kuhnamo in the north.
