= HYLA =

The HYLA logo.

HYLA is a registered trademark by the Finnish food industry company Valio. The name comes from the term hydrolysoitu laktoosi ('hydrolysed lactose') and refers to the low lactose content of HYLA milk products.

Milk products with the HYLA label contain less than 1% lactose, so they are suitable for many lactose intolerant people, for whom use of regular milk products causes stomach ache. The lactose in HYLA products is split into glucose and galactose during preparation by adding lactase enzyme to them.

HYLA milk tastes sweeter than regular milk, as glucose and galactose taste about two and six times as sweet as lactose. HYLA milk also has a higher glycemic index, as the blood sugar raising effect of glucose is over two times higher than that of lactose.

Valio started research about hydrolysed lactose in the early 1970s. In 1978 Valio brought its first HYLA product, milk powder, to the market, followed by milk and other products later. In the late 1990s Valio researched and developed technology for almost completely lactose-free milk products, containing less than 0.01% lactose. Valio's first lactose-free product, light milk drink, was launched in 2001.
