= Oltermanni =

Brand of Finnish cheese

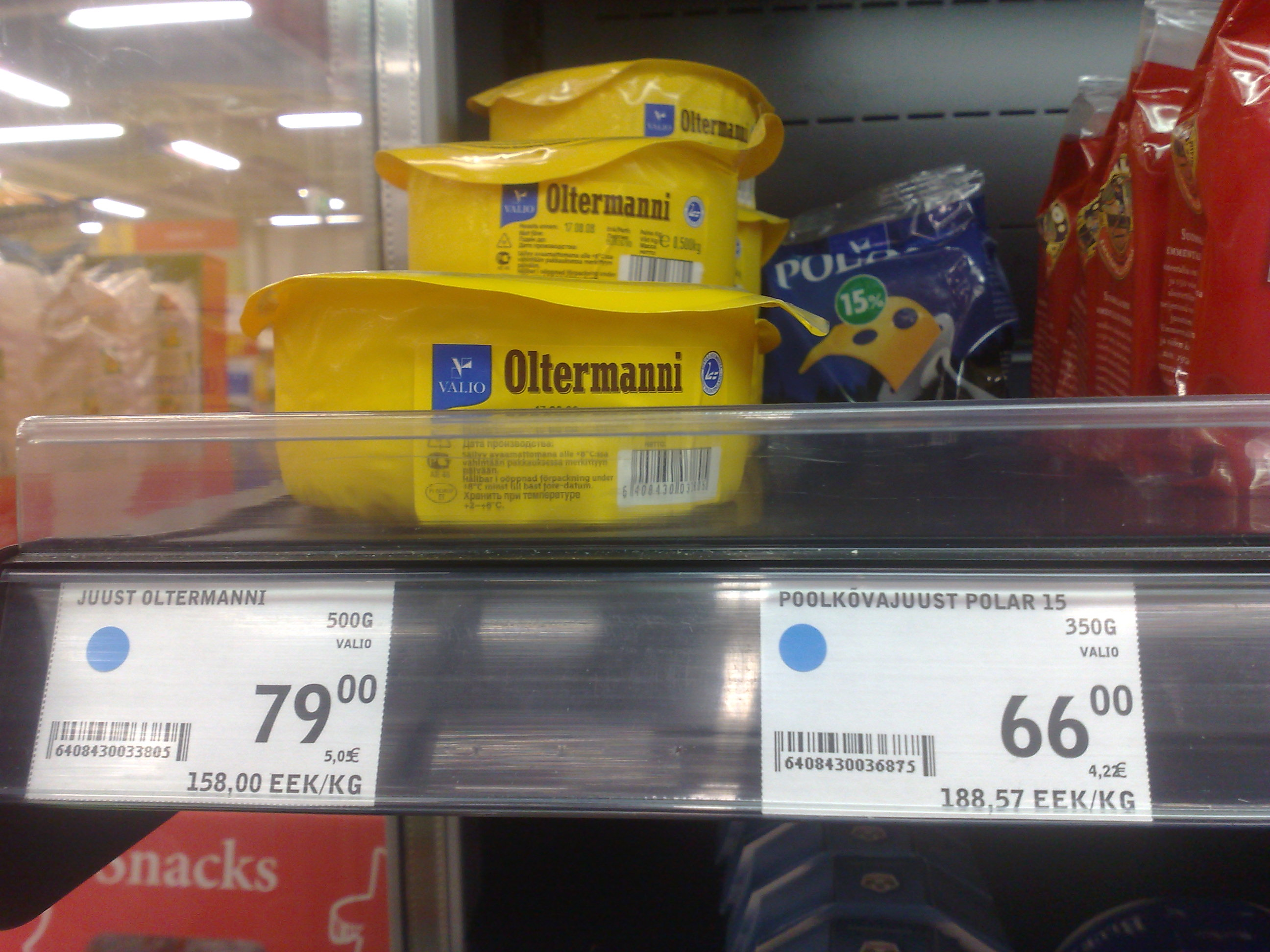
Oltermanni in an Estonian supermarket.

Oltermanni (Finnish for Alderman) is a brand of Finnish cheese somewhat similar to the Danish cheese Havarti. It is often eaten on rye bread, or with other dishes (e.g. karelian pasties). Oltermanni is manufactured by Valio. The cheese is less salty than others.

Oltermanni cheese is a product developed by the Isokyrö cooperative dairy (Kyrönmaa Dairy Cooperative since 1984). A small cylindrical Oltermanni wrapped in a yellow bag was given to each Valio milk producer in 1980 as a gift to celebrate Valio's 75th anniversary. Cheese for general sale was launched in 1981. A researcher writing a doctoral thesis about alderman councils (oltermannihallinto) proposed the name Oltermanni.

In 1997, Oltermanni began to produce lighter version of the cheese with a fat content of 17% by weight. The product family expanded in 2008 with a 9% low-fat version. In addition, Valio produces a cheese-like product containing vegetable fat, Valio Oltermanni rapeseed. Oltermanni Cheese with a 33% fat content is sold in Finland under the name Oltermanni Täyteläinen.

As a result of the tighter border controls due to the COVID-19 pandemic, the international sanctions during the Russo-Ukrainian war and the Russian counter-sanctions, Oltermanni became unavailable in Russia, which led to a black market for the cheese in Russia. The cheese was being sold at fourfold prices compared to Finnish ones. As a response to this, border supermarkets implemented buying limits on Oltermanni, allowing only 11 kilograms (24 lb) per household. Russian import limits being 5 kilograms (11 lb), this led to cheese smuggling by lorry drivers.

== See also ==
- List of cheeses
