= Matti Pietinen =

Finnish politician (1859–1918)

Matti Pietinen (3 March 1859 – 27 April 1918; original surname Pitkänen) was a Finnish schoolteacher, factory owner and politician, born in Sumiainen. He was a member of the Diet of Finland from 1904 to 1906 and of the Parliament of Finland from 1910 to 1913, representing the Young Finnish Party.

Being a prominent supporter of the White side, he was arrested by Red Guards during the Finnish Civil War and shot in Viipuri on 27 April 1918, as White troops were preparing to storm the city.
