= Kuokanjoki =

River in Finland

Coordinates: 62°38′59″N 26°02′54″E

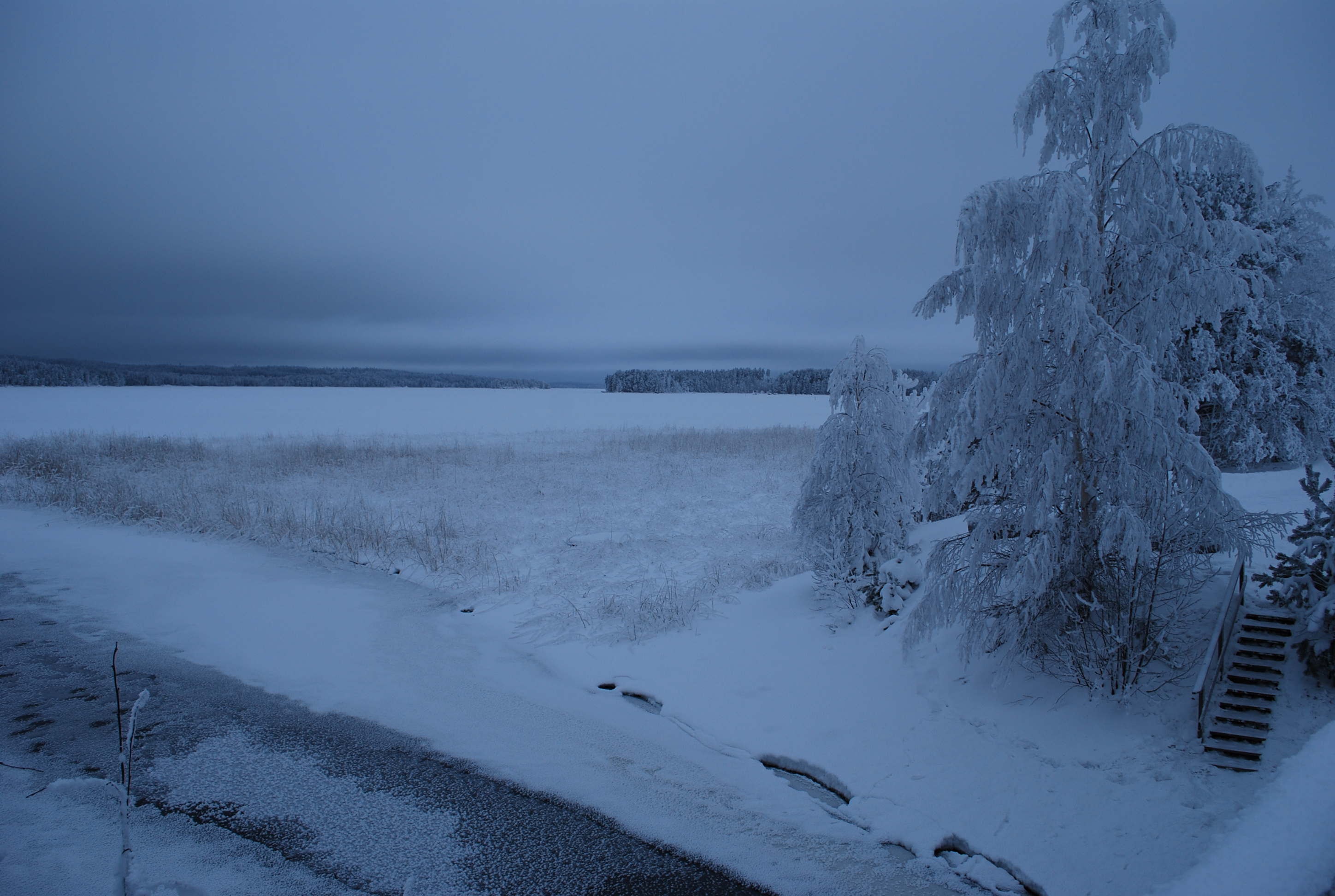
Kuokanjoki in winter

Kuokanjoki is a watercourse in Finland. It is located in the province of Central Finland, 300 km north of the capital Helsinki. The area is part of the boreal climate zone. The watercourse is Finland's shortest river and one of the world's shortest rivers.

The river is 3.5 meters long and is located between the lakes Sumiaisjärvi and Ala-Keitele. The river is located south of the village of Sumiainen which lies on a headland between the two lakes in the former municipality of Sumiainen, in the new municipality of Äänekoski. The village road Sumiaisraitti leads south, out of the village across the river on a road bridge. The village road that crosses the river is part of the regional road 637.
