= Äänekoski =

- Town
- Äänekosken kaupunki Äänekoski stad
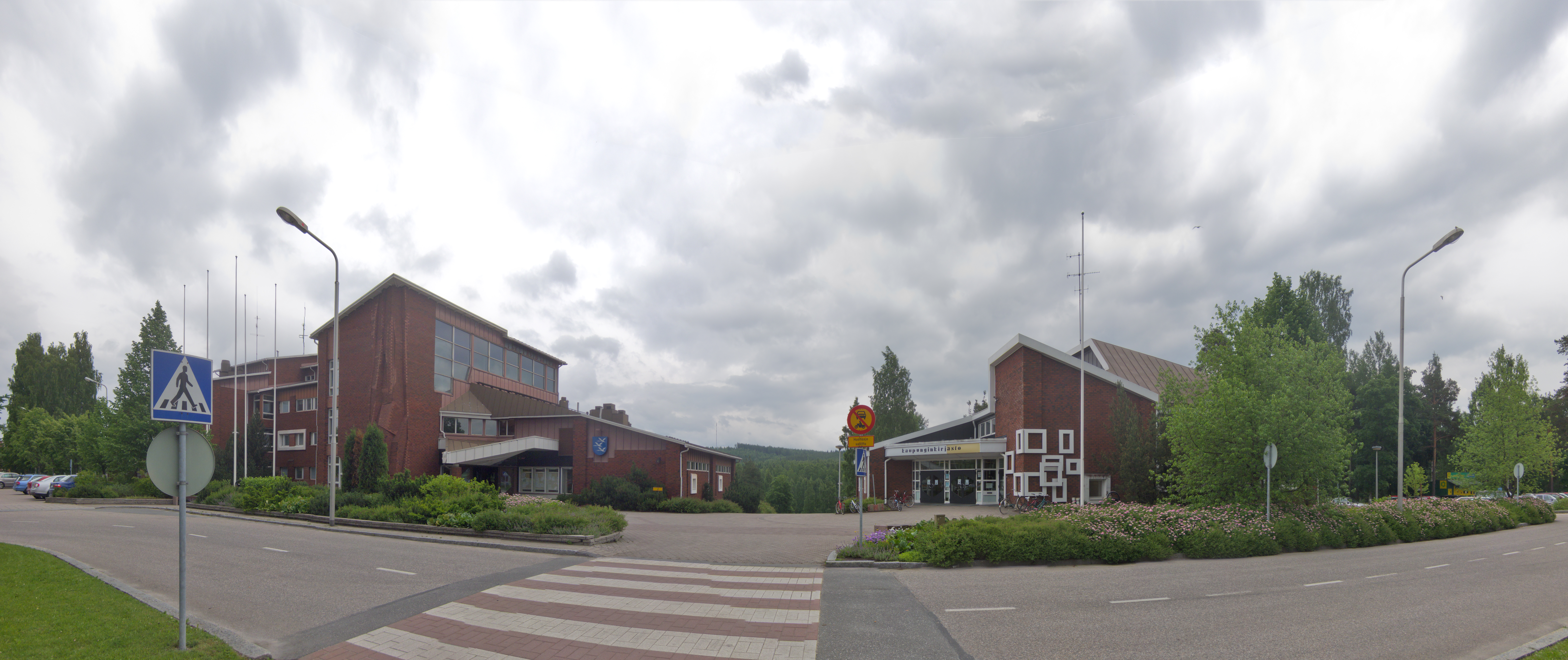
- Äänekoski town hall and library

- Coat of arms

- Location of Äänekoski in Finland
- Interactive map of Äänekoski
- Coordinates: 62°36′N 025°43.5′E
- Country: Finland
- Region: Central Finland
- Sub-region: Äänekoski
- Charter: 1932
- City rights: 1973

Government
  - Town manager: Matti Tuononen

Area (2018-01-01)
  - Total: 1,138.39 km^{2} (439.53 sq mi)
  - Land: 884.61 km^{2} (341.55 sq mi)
  - Water: 253.84 km^{2} (98.01 sq mi)
  - Rank: 87th largest in Finland

Population (2025-12-31)
  - Total: 17,492
  - Rank: 65th largest in Finland
  - Density: 19.77/km^{2} (51.2/sq mi)

Population by native language
  - Finnish: 96.5% (official)
  - Swedish: 0.1%
  - Others: 3.4%

Population by age
  - 0 to 14: 15.2%
  - 15 to 64: 56.8%
  - 65 or older: 27.9%
- Time zone: UTC+02:00 (EET)
  - Summer (DST): UTC+03:00 (EEST)
- Website: www.aanekoski.fi

Äänekoski (Finnish pronunciation: [ˈæːneˌkːoski]) is a town in Finland, located in the Central Finland region, about 45 kilometres (28 mi) north of Jyväskylä, the region's capital city. Äänekoski has a population of 17,492, as of 31 December 2025, and covers an area of 1,138.39 square kilometres (439.53 sq mi) of which 253.84 km^{2} (98.01 sq mi), or 22%, is water. The population density is 19.77 inhabitants per square kilometre (51.2/sq mi).

Neighbouring municipalities are Kannonkoski, Konnevesi, Laukaa, Saarijärvi, Uurainen, Vesanto and Viitasaari.

The municipality is unilingually Finnish.

The municipality of Äänekosken maalaiskunta was consolidated to Äänekoski in 1969 and the municipality of Konginkangas in 1993. The municipalities of Sumiainen and Suolahti were consolidated to Äänekoski in 2007.

== History ==
Coat of arms of Äänekoski until 2007. The modern coat of arms was originally used by Suolahti.

Äänekoski is named after the nearby rapids. Folk etymology connects the name to the word ääni "sound", but Terho Itkonen has suggested another origin: a Sámi term meaning "big, large" (compare Northern Sámi eanas, "most").

Swedish sources mention a salmon fishery by the rapids around 1455, Ænækoski laxefiskeri. At the time, it was not a proper settlement and was located in the hunting grounds of the people of Sysmä. The Rautalampi parish was established in 1561, at the time it was a large parish covering most of Central Finland north of the Päijänne. The Laukaa parish, including the area of Äänekoski, was separated from Rautalampi in 1628.

A settlement named Äänekoski has existed at least since 1752. It remained a part of Laukaa until the parish was established in 1907 and the municipality Äänekosken maalaiskunta was established in 1911. At the time, Äänekosken maalaiskunta was called simply Äänekoski. The municipality was divided in 1932: the actual settlement of Äänekoski became the kauppala of Äänekoski, Suolahti became another kauppala while the old Äänekoski municipality was renamed Äänekosken maalaiskunta and its administrative seat was moved to the village of Honkola. Äänekoski and Äänekosken maalaiskunta still shared a parish.

The first industrial enterprises appeared in 1896–1900.

Four municipalities have been consolidated with Äänekoski: Äänekosken maalaiskunta in 1969, Konginkangas in 1993 and Sumiainen and Suolahti in 2007. Äänekoski adopted the coat of arms of Suolahti in 2007.

== Geography ==
Municipalities merged into Äänekoski: Konginkangas, Sumiainen, Suolahti and Äänekosken maalaiskunta.

Äänekoski is located along Finnish national road 4 approximately 40 km north of Jyväskylä. Finnish national road 69 to Suonenjoki begins in Hirvaskangas, 12 km south of Äänekoski center. Finnish national road 13 between Kokkola and Lappeenranta passes through Honkola, 6 km south of Äänekoski center. Äänekoski center is located between the Ääneselkä open water part of Lake Keitele and Lake Kuhnamo.

=== Villages ===
Modern Äänekoski is a product of a merger of multiple former municipalities, where the following villages were officially named:

- Konginkangas: Kalaniemi, Konginkangas center, Pyyrinlahti
- Sumiainen: Paadentaipale, Raikkaus, Sumiaisten kirkonkylä (Sumiainen church village)
- Suolahti: Suolahti center
- Äänekoski ja Äänekosken maalaiskunta (Rural Municipality of Äänekoski): Äänekoski center, Honkola, Kangashäkki (main part of which is in Uurainen), Kiimasjärvi, Koivisto (Koivistonkylä) and Petruma.

Besides these official divisions, the following villages or neighborhoods are also informally recognized: Hietama, Hirvaskangas, Laajaranta, Liimattala, Mämme, Parantala and Rannankylä.

=== Nature ===
The area is heavily forested. It is also defined by the fractured Lake Keitele, which stretches generally in the southwest-northeast direction from Äänekoski center to the open waters of Keitele proper in Havusalmi, but which has multiple bays in the perpendicular, southeast-northwest direction.

There are 13 Natura 2000 protected areas in Äänekoski. These include esker areas, waters rich in bird life and part of the Hitonhauta-Kylmähauta-Hirvasjoki ravine area, which extends from Äänekoski to Laukaa.

There are altogether 170 lakes in Äänekoski. The biggest lakes are Keitele, Kuhnamo and Niinivesi.

One of the world's smallest rivers, the Kuokanjoki (just 3.5 meters long), is within the area. Aatunselkä lake is also located in this area.

== Demographics ==
In 2021, there were 18,318 inhabitants, of which 75.8% lived in urban areas. There are three urban areas: Äänekoski center (12,899 inhabitants), Konginkangas (445) and Sumiaisten kirkonkylä (church village of Sumiainen, 406). Suolahden keskustaajama (the center of Suolahti), Kierälahti and Paatela used to categorized as a separate urban areas, but they are now counted as a part of Äänekoski center.

== Economy ==
Äänekoski is a major industrial center. The largest corporate tax payer is Valtra, a manufacturer of tractors and agricultural machinery, which is a part of AGCO Corporation, followed by Kurikka Timber, a manufacturer of window components. Aura cheese is manufactured in the Valio's Äänekoski dairy. The forest, pulp and paper industry is a major employer. In 1891, a groundwood pulp mill and a cardboard factory was founded in Äänekoski. Currently, sites in Äänekoski include a Metsä Board folding boxboard factory, Metsä Fibre kraft pulp and bioproduct mill, Metsä Wood plywood factory (former Finnforest) and a Nouryon plant (former CP Kelco), which manufactures chemical derivatives of cellulose.

== Twin towns – sister cities ==
The following cities or municipalities are twinned with Äänekoski:

- Örnsköldsvik Municipality, Sweden
- Brande, Brande Municipality, Denmark
- Sigdal, Norway
- Alushta, Alushta municipality, Ukraine
- Borovichi, Novgorod Oblast, Russia (status unknown)
- Sestroretsk, Russia
- Niamey, Niger

== Gallery ==
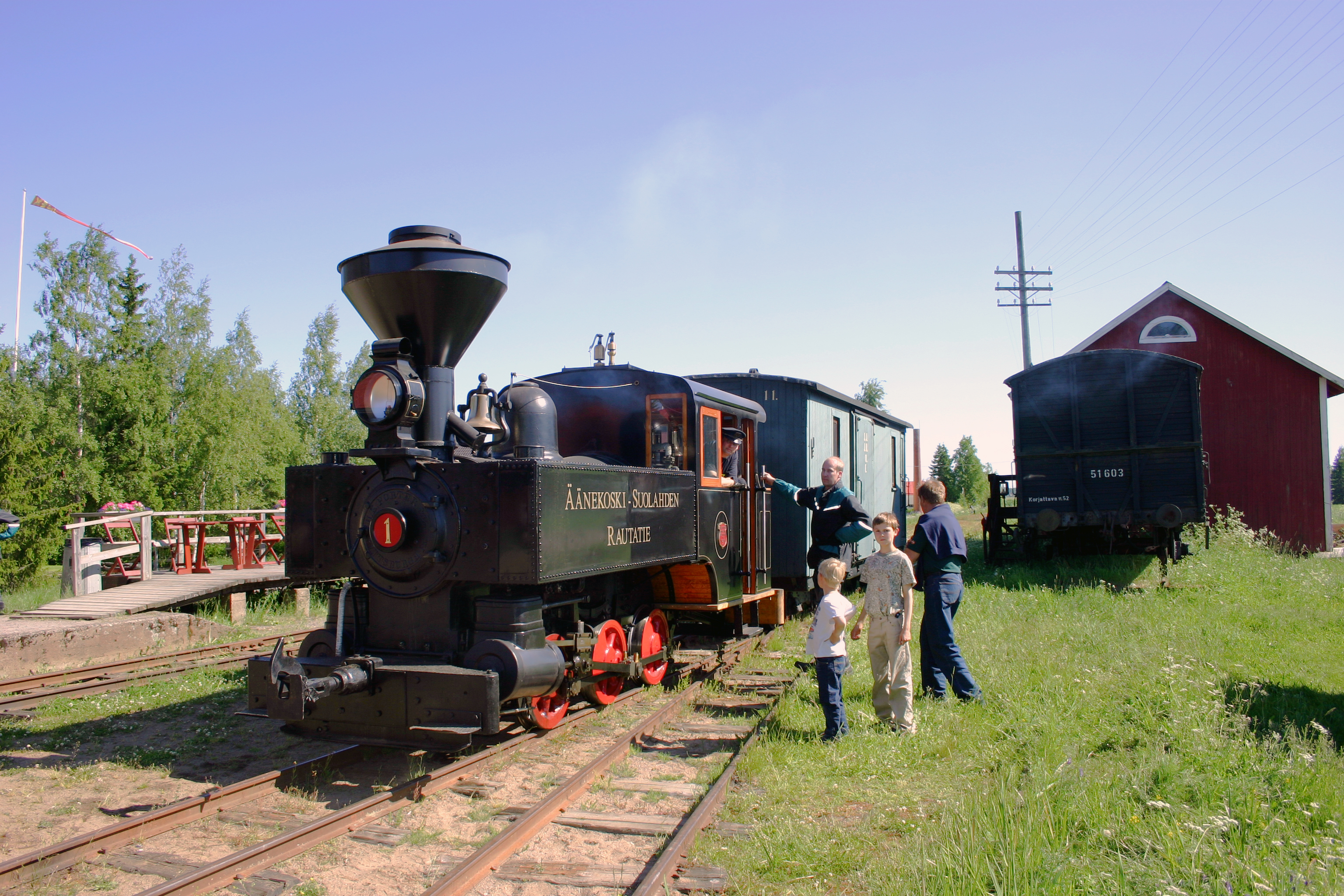
A porter locomotive of the Äänekoski-Suolahti narrow-gauge railway

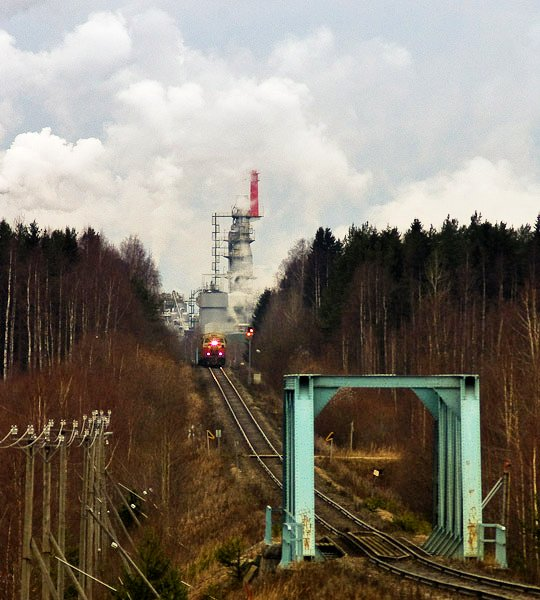
A freight train departing from a pulp mill in Äänekoski

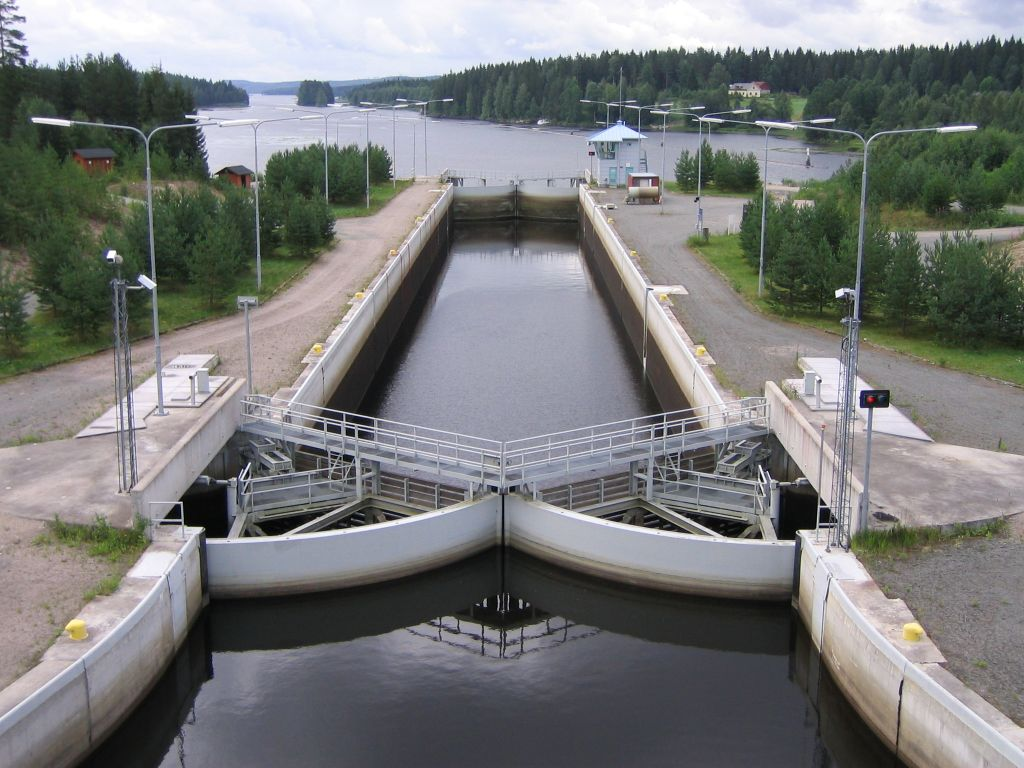
Kapeenkoski Lock of Keitele–Päijänne canal.

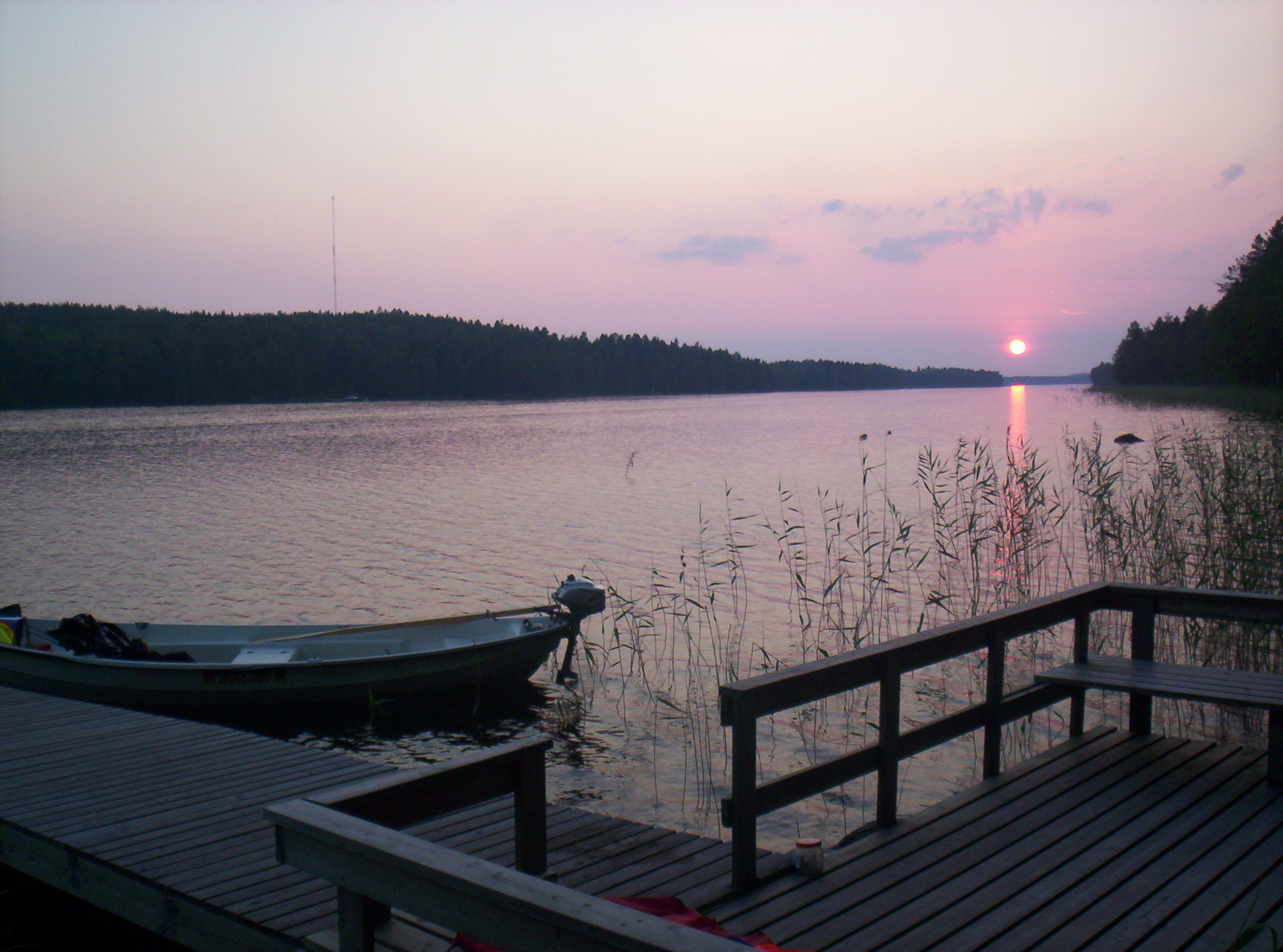
A sunset at Lake Keitele

== See also ==
- Aura cheese – a blue cheese produced in Äänekoski
- Finnish national road 69
