= Suonenjoki rail collision =

1998 train collision in Suonenjoki, Finland

Coordinates: 62°36′56″N 27°7′30″E

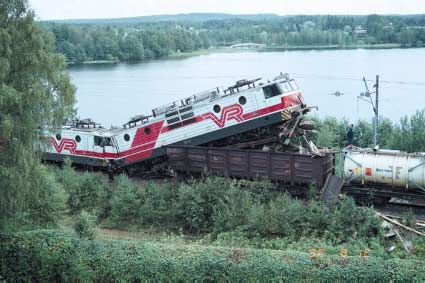

Details
- Date: 12 August 1998; 5:58:12 am
- Location: Suonenjoki
- Country: Finland
- Line: Pieksämäki–Kuopio line
- Operator: VR Group
- Incident type: Collision
- Cause: Misinterpretation of signals, possible signal malfunction

Statistics
- Trains: 2
- Passengers: 51
- Deaths: 0
- Injured: 26

The Suonenjoki rail collision occurred on 12 August 1998, when a southbound VR InterCity train and a VR freight train arriving from the south collided south of the Suonenjoki railway station in Finland. Twenty-six people were injured, one of them seriously. The rear end of the locomotive of the freight train was thrust high towards the air upon its first car.

== Chronology of events ==
VR's InterCity No. 72, en route from Iisalmi to Helsinki via Kouvola, was scheduled to pass VR freight train 2051 in Airaksela, 20 kilometres (12 mi) north of Suonenjoki, with the freight train waiting on the passing loop and the InterCity using the main line. However, on the day of the collision the freight train was running 30 minutes late. The train dispatcher was planning to make the pass at Suonenjoki railway station, which would delay the departure of the InterCity by three minutes. A route was secured for the InterCity to Suonenjoki railway station, where it was signaled to stop and wait for the freight train to pass.

However, before the freight train could arrive at Suonenjoki, the InterCity left the station on schedule at 5:57:01, missing the red "stop" aspect of the signal. Upon noticing the approaching train the drivers of both trains activated the emergency brakes and, when the collision seemed inevitable, jumped off the trains. The dispatcher noticed that the main track was occupied by the wrong train and immediately started calling both trains on radio. No answer was heard, however, as the drivers had already jumped out. The trains collided.

Due to the high velocity of the passenger train – 44 km/h (27 mph) – and the large mass of the freight train, running at 25 km/h (16 mph)) on impact, the collision was violent. The whole InterCity train moved back 4 metres (13 ft) and the first two cars of the freight train were pushed under its locomotive. This forced the rear end of the locomotive to rise high up in the air and touch the overhead lines. The cars luckily remained on the tracks, which were running on a high embankment.

== Causes ==
The collision was caused by the InterCity driver ignoring the stop aspect of the main signal. The driver heard the conductor's "ready" bell signal and concentrated on leaving the station. A signal repeater was possibly malfunctioning. Other contributing factors were the bright daylight that prevented the driver from clearly seeing the red signal, and the general "obsession" among InterCity drivers to obey the timetable by the second. InterCity trains generally have priority of route securing and signals often already display a "proceed" aspect upon arrival, leading the driver to not expect a "stop" aspect.

== Aftermath ==
The accident, coupled with the Jyväskylä rail accident, showed the importance of the automatic train control system, which was installed on all major lines during the following years, and was later expanded to cover all passenger lines and all goods-only lines with the exception of lines which see only a maximum of few trains a day.

The two locomotives, Sr1 units 3042 (freight train) and 3031 (InterCity) were refurbished and returned to service.

As the result of this collision and the expansion of automatic train control, signal repeaters were removed from all stations except the Helsinki Central railway station.

== See also ==
- Finnish railway signalling
