= Aura cheese =

Blue cheese produced in Äänekoski, Finland

Aura Cheese
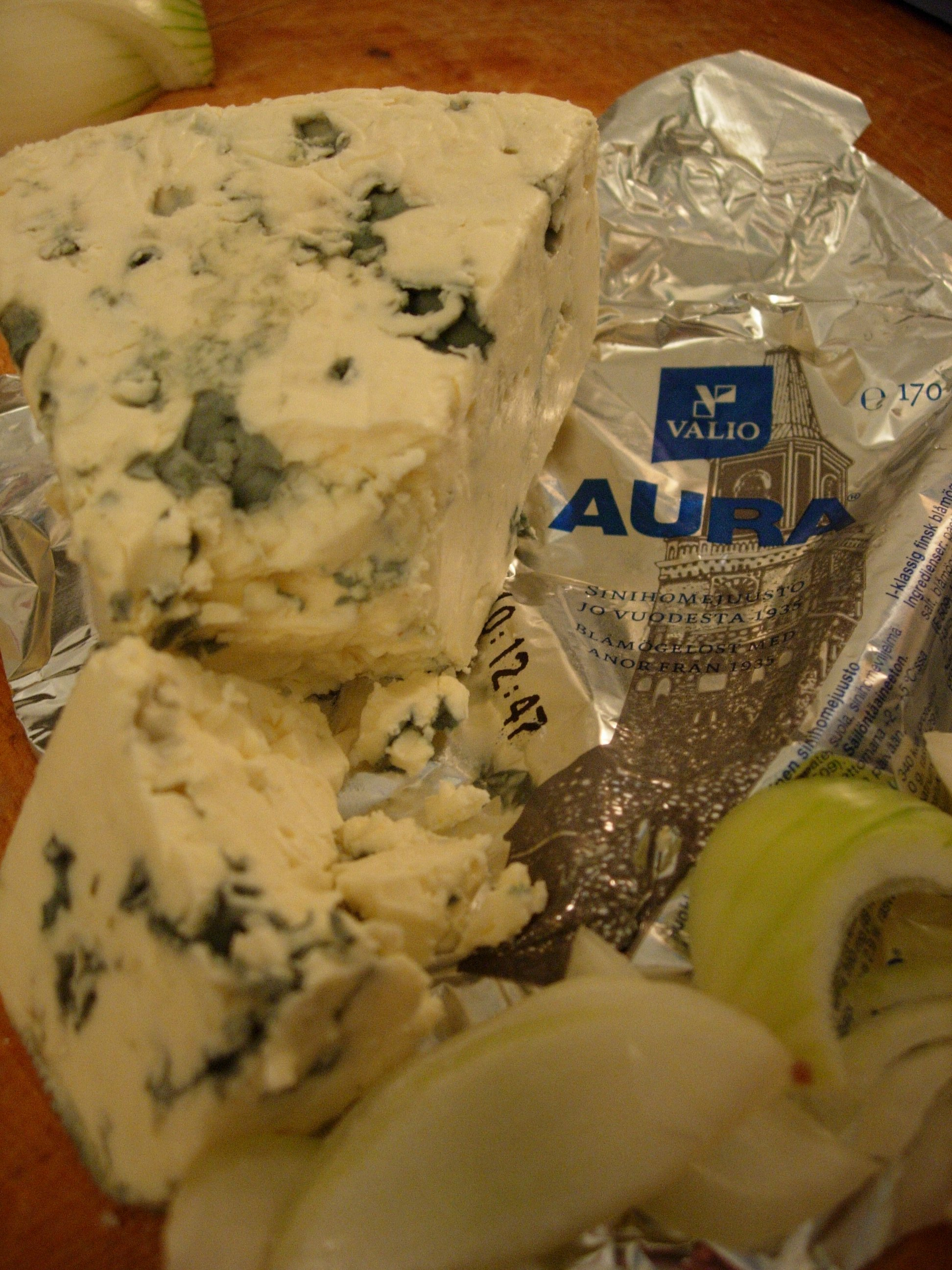
- Other names: Midnight Blue
- Country of origin: Finland
- Region: Äänekoski, Finland
- Source of milk: cow's milk
- Texture: Hard, Crumbly
- Aging time: Regular Aura - 6 weeks, Aura Gold - 12 Weeks
- Named after: The Aura River - Finland

Aura is a type of blue cheese produced in Äänekoski, Finland, by the Finnish dairy company Valio. Aura is made of cow's milk and takes its name from the Aura River, which runs through the city of Turku. The cheese is available in two varieties. The regular variety is aged for six weeks, whereas the stronger 'Aura Gold' variety is aged for 12 weeks. It is marketed in the United States under the name Midnight Blue by Valio's import company, Finlandia Cheese

== Production/manufacturing ==
Aura Cheese production is alike other cheeses, using pasturised cows milk as the base, however it uses a blue found called Penicillium roqueforti, which is used in other cheeses such as Gorgonzola, Cambozola, Stilton and many more. What separates it from other blue cheeses is its incredible saltiness, which boosts production significantly. Most blue cheese's take a long time to safely develop complex flavours, whereas Valio can develop their flavours for aura cheese in only 6-12 weeks (depending on the variant).

Aura cheese uses the traditional method of Blue cheese production, which involves puncturing the immature cheese with needles, which introduces oxygen into the cheese allowing for the Penicillium roqueforti mould to form.

They do this by using a very specific fast acting strain of Penicillium roqueforti, which builds the complex flavours faster than your traditional blue cheeses. Aura cheese has 2 variants, which are explained below:

=== Traditional ===
Traditional Aura cheese is aged for 6 weeks. because of the fast acting strain of Penicillium roqueforti it is able to fully age this quickly.

=== Aura Gold ===
Aura Gold is made using the same recipe as Traditional Aura but is aged for 12 weeks instead of six. The longer maturation results in a stronger, more intense flavor and a crumblier texture.

== Nutritional information ==
Aura cheese classifies the average serving size as 42 grams. The table below shows the nutritional data for the servings and for 100g.

Aura Cheese Nutritional Data
Nutrient	Per Serving (42g)	Per 100g
Energy	592 kJ (143 kcal)	1409 kJ (340 kcal)
Fat	12.2g	29g
Protein	7.8g	18.5g
Salt	1.3g	3g
Carbohydrates	0g	0g

== Ingredient composition ==
Aura cheese is made very similarly to other cheeses, its ingredients and their compositions are listed in the table below:

Aura Cheese Composition
Ingredient	Percentage
Pasteurized Milk	93.0% – 94.0%
Salt	2.9% – 3.1%
Starter Culture	< 2.0%
Blue Mold Culture	< 0.5%

in the production of aura cheese they also use some unnoticeable ingredients such as Calcium Chloride (E509) which is an acidity regulator, Natamycin (E235) which is a preservative used to prevent non intentional external mould on the exterior. Aura cheese also uses Lactase Enzymes which breaks down lactose, making the cheese lactose free.

== See also ==
- List of cheeses
- Red Leicester
- Cambozola
