= Lactose-free milk =

Milk with lactose removed

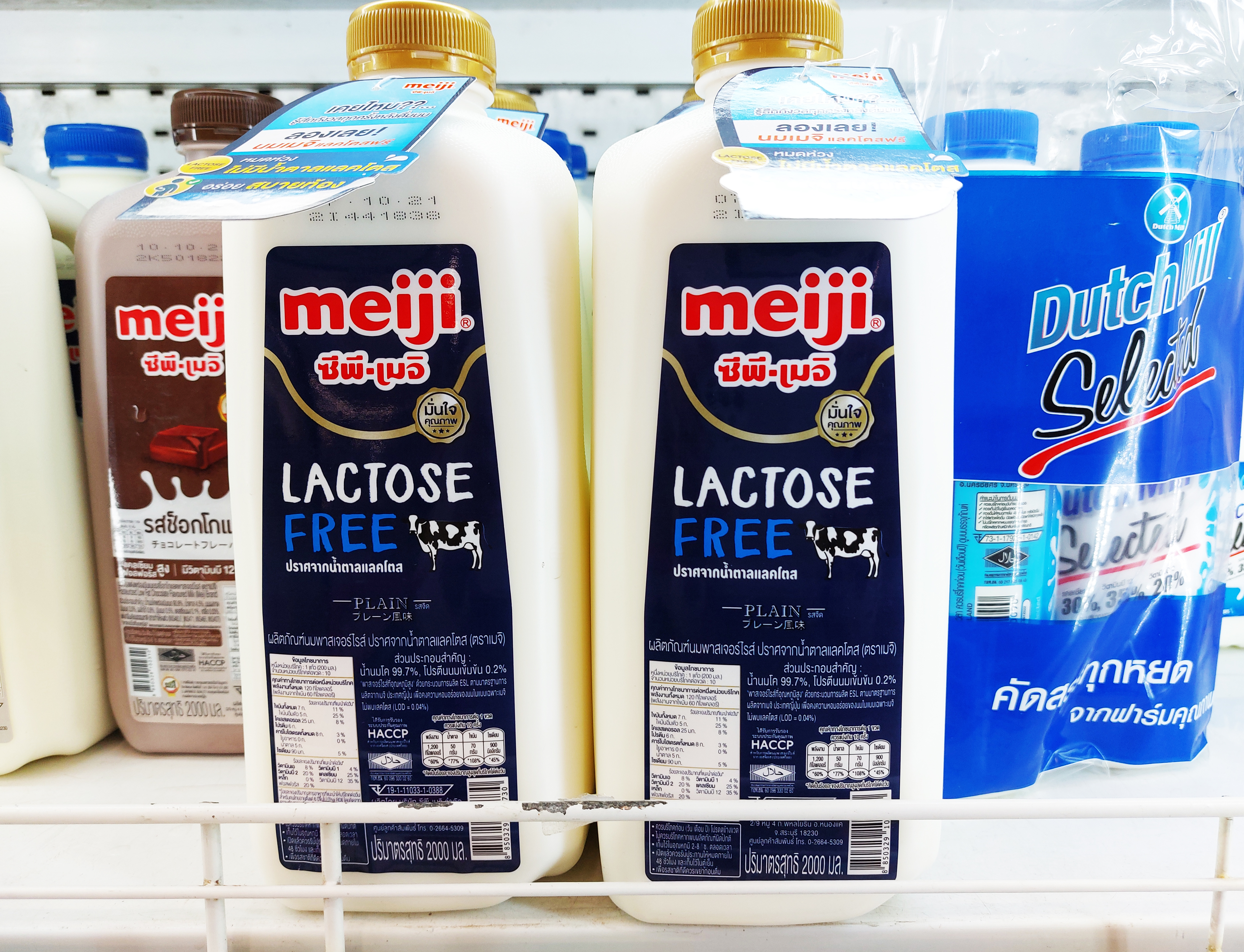
Lactose-free milk being sold in Bangkok, Thailand

Lactose-free milk is a form of milk with the lactose absent, usually replaced with galactose and glucose. Lactose-free milk is usually consumed by individuals who are lactose intolerant, and the milk can create different dairy products as well. Various techniques and processes exist for the creation of lactose-free milk. The most common is using the enzyme lactase, to convert it into digestible sugars. Lactase found in the gut allows for lactose tolerance in mammals. It differs from plant milks as lactose-free milk comes from animals and is thereby considered a dairy product. The taste of lactose-free milk is often sweeter than non-lactose, although this can depend on the process.

== Production ==
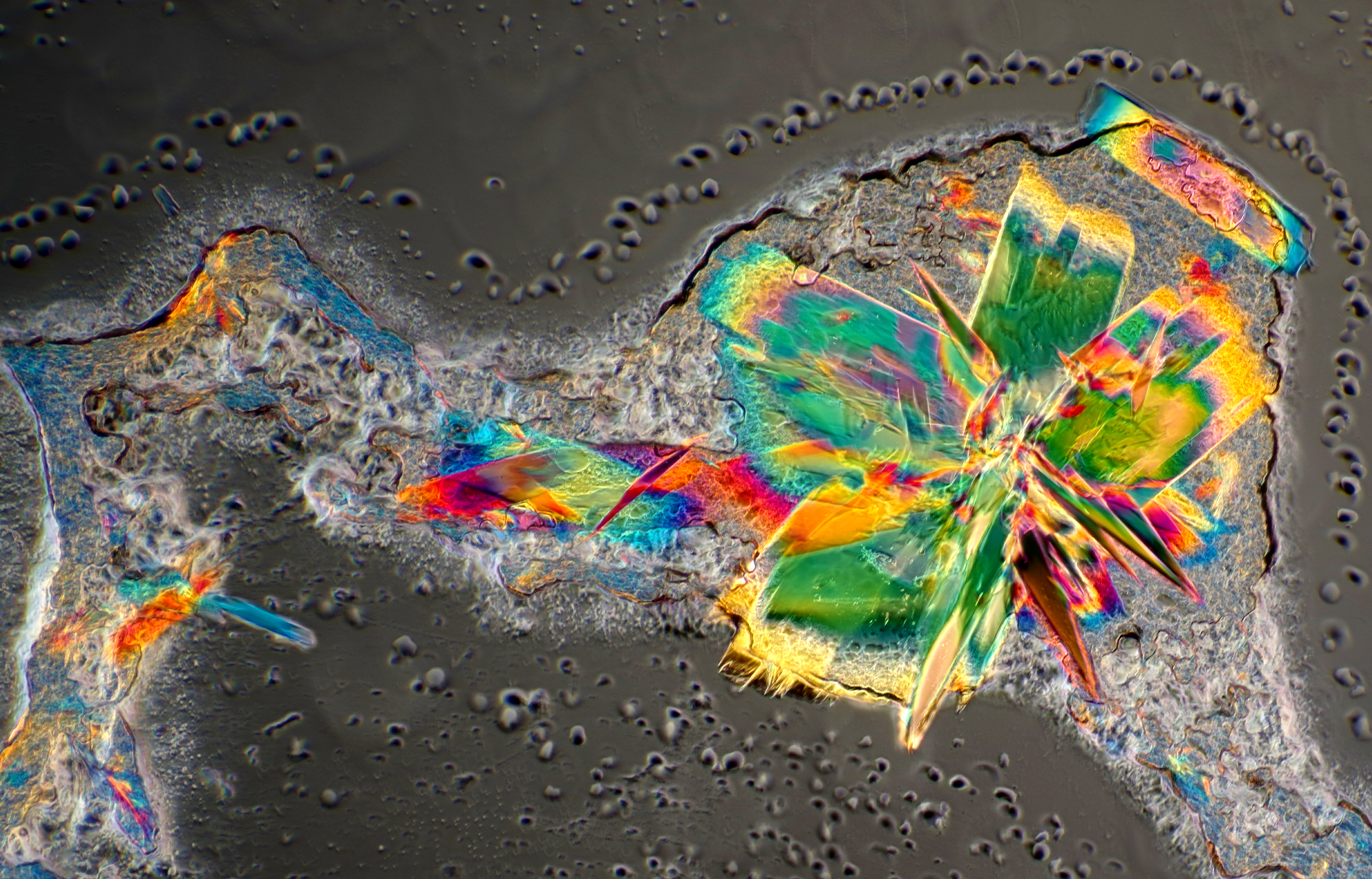
Lactose crystal under a microscope

The production of lactose-free milk usually involves lactase which is added to the milk, then heated and mixed. Lactase is usually produced from strains of yeast such as Kluyveromyces fragilis and Kluyveromyces lactis. β-Galactosidase can also be used for lactose removal. The first fully lactose free milk for consumers was developed by the Finnish dairy company Valio in 2001 using the ultrafiltration method.

== Consumption ==
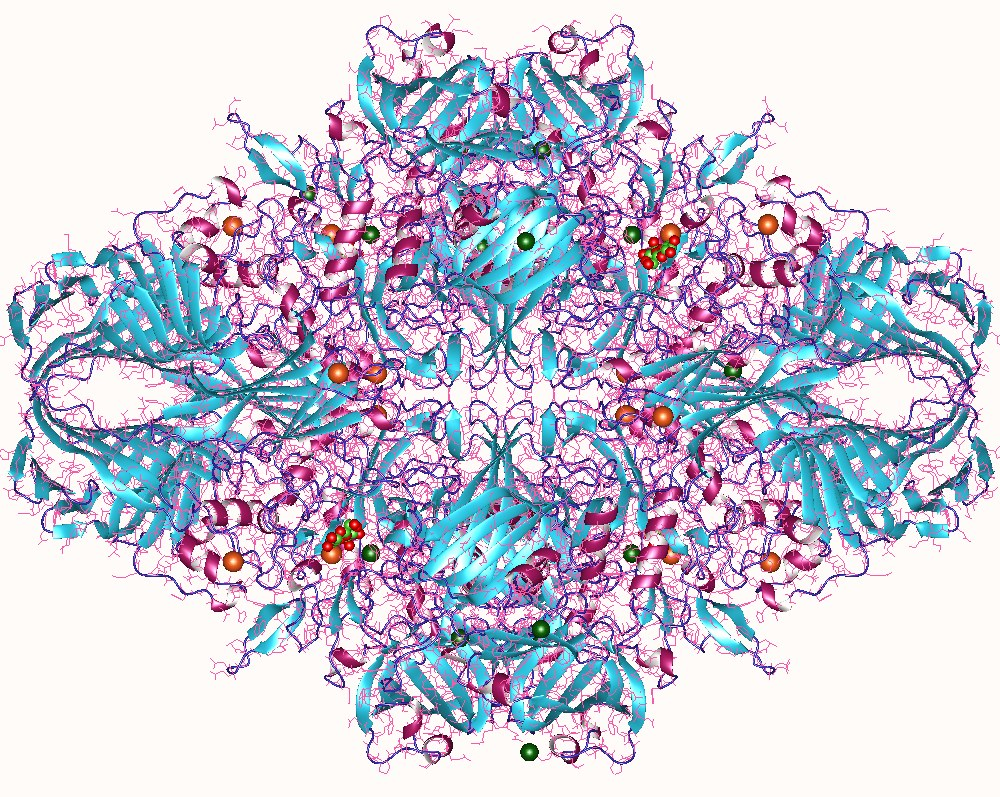
Lactase enzyme which when deficient causes lactose intolerance

Lactose-free milk is mainly produced because it can be consumed by lactose intolerant people without causing negative effects such as bloating and nausea. Although mainly consumed in the form of milk, lactose-free milk can be turned into other dairy products. Cheeses, despite containing lower average levels of lactose than milk, can also be turned lactose free. This is more prevalent among soft cheeses such as goat cheese, as they have higher levels of lactose compared to hard cheeses. Ice cream, which has high levels of lactose, can also be produced from lactose-free milk.

Western Europe is the largest consumer of lactose-free milk, followed by Latin America.

== Taste ==
Lactose has a lower affinity for sweet taste receptors than galactose and glucose; as such, the taste of lactose-free milk is often sweeter than lactose equivalents, even if containing the same amount of sugar. A method to make the sweetness level comparable to lactose milk involves reducing the ratio of galactose and glucose in the milk. This also lowers the amount of sugar in the milk. The viscosity of lactose-free milk is also described as lower.

== See also ==
- A2 milk
- MCM6
- Dairy and health
- Fermented milk products
