= Finnish national road 69 =

Road in Finland

Highway 69
- Kantatie 69 (Finnish); Stamväg 69 (Swedish)
- Kantatie 69, Stamväg 69
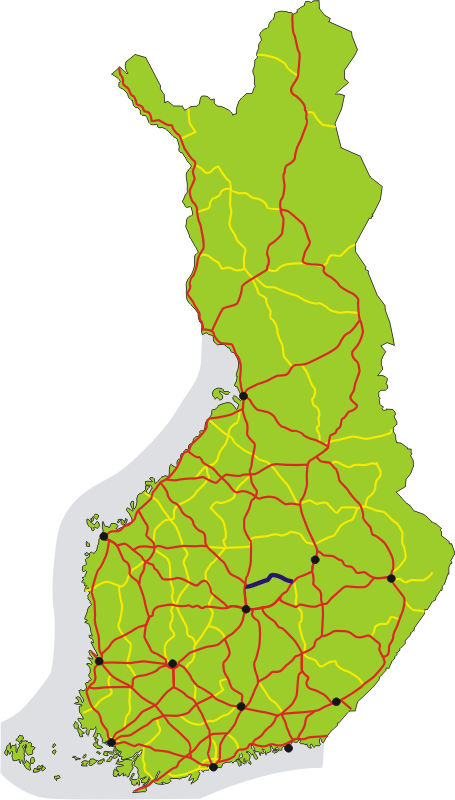

Route information
- Maintained by the Finnish Transport Agency
- Length: 88 km (55 mi)
- Existed: 1938–present

Major junctions
- From: Äänekoski
- To: Suonenjoki

Location
- Country: Finland

Highway system
- Highways in Finland
← Kt 68	→ Kt 71

The Finnish national road 69 (Finnish: Kantatie 69; Swedish: Stamväg 69) is the 2nd class main route from Äänekoski's Hirvaskangas to Suonenjoki's Levä. The length of the road is 88 kilometers. The road as a whole is two-lane and of varying quality.

== History ==
In the 1938 numbering system, main road 69 ran nearly on its current route: beginning at Laukaa tar factory and ran roughly along the current route to Suonenjoki. After the current route of the dual carriageway was completed, the section from Jyväskylä to Tervatehtaa became part of main road 69. In 1965, the route was realigned due to completion of the road between Hirvaskangas and Tankolampi.

Main road 69 was cancelled and renumbered to regional road 644 in the early 1970s due to completion of Highway 9 between Jyväskylä and Kuopio, but was restored in 1976, the only main road in Finland decommissioned and restored on the same route.

== Route ==
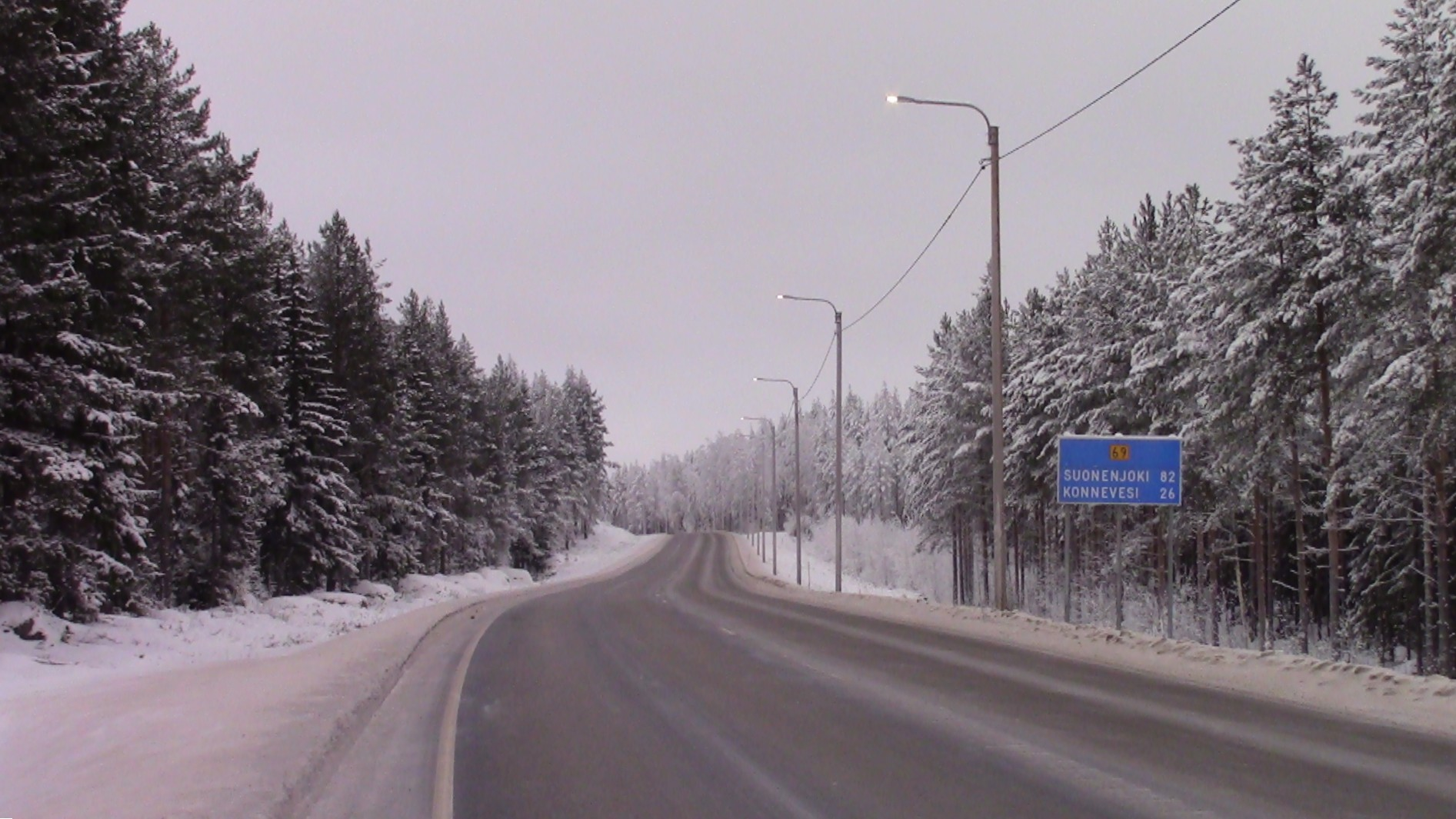
Main road 69 at Äänekoski in February 2026

The road passes through the following municipalities, localities in brackets:

- Äänekoski (Hirvaskangas)
- Laukaa
- Äänekoski (Kaura-aho)
- Laukaa
- Konnevesi (Istunmäki, Kivisalmi and Konnevesi)
- Rautalampi (Pakarila and Rautalampi)
- Suonenjoki
- Rautalampi
- Suonenjoki (Levä)

== Sources ==
- "Kartta ilmakuvilla" (in Finnish). Fonecta. Archived from the original on April 30, 2013.
- Grönroos, Matti. "Kantatie 69 Äänekoski–Suonenjoki, 87 km" (in Finnish).
