= Central Finland =

Region of Finland

Central Finland Keski-Suomi (Finnish) Mellersta Finland (Swedish)
- Region
- Region of Central Finland; Keski-Suomen maakunta Landskapet Mellersta Finland
- Flag Coat of arms

- Central Finland on a map of Finland
- Coordinates: 62°30′N 025°30′E
- Country: Finland
- Historical province: Tavastia, Satakunta
- Capital: Jyväskylä
- Other towns: Äänekoski, Jämsä, Keuruu, Saarijärvi and Viitasaari

Government
  - Regional Mayor: Pekka Hokkanen

Area
  - Total: 19,950.38 km^{2} (7,702.88 sq mi)

Population (2019)
  - Total: 275,104
  - Density: 13.7894/km^{2} (35.7144/sq mi)

GDP
  - Total: €8.725 billion (2015)
  - Per capita: €31,662 (2015)
- Time zone: UTC+2 (EET)
  - Summer (DST): UTC+3 (EEST)
- ISO 3166 code: FI-08
- NUTS: 193
- Regional animal: Mountain hare (Lepus timidus)
- Regional bird: Capercaillie (Tetrao urogallus)
- Regional fish: Lake trout (Salmo trutta lacustris)
- Regional flower: Oxeye daisy (Leucanthemum vulgare)
- Regional stone: Diorite
- Regional lake: Lake Keitele
- Website: keskisuomi.fi

Central Finland (Finnish: Keski-Suomi; Swedish: Mellersta Finland) is a region (maakunta / landskap) in Finland. It borders the regions of Päijät-Häme, Pirkanmaa, South Ostrobothnia, Central Ostrobothnia, North Ostrobothnia, North Savo, and South Savo. The city of Jyväskylä is the regional centre and by far the largest city in the area. Central Finland lies slightly south of the geographical centre of Finland. The landscape is hilly and a large part of the province belongs to the Finnish Lakeland.

The largest lake in the very water-based region is Lake Päijänne (1,080 km^{2}). Other large lakes are Lake Keitele (490 km2), Lake Konnevesi (190 km^{2}) and Lake Kivijärvi (150 km^{2}). The highest point in the region is Kiiskilänmäki in the municipality of Multia, which reaches an altitude of 269 meters above sea level. Kuokanjoki, Finland's shortest river and one of the world's shortest rivers is in the region.

Central Finland has been one of the slowly growing regions in terms of population, but the growth has been based on the Jyväskylä sub-region's position as a significant growth center, and most of the region's municipalities are declining in population. Also, of these, Kyyjärvi has landed on the Finnish state's crisis financial management list due to its economic hardship. Luhanka, the smallest municipality in the whole Mainland Finland in terms of population, is also located in the region.

The western capercaillie (Tetrao urogallus) is the regional bird of Central Finland that is also depicted in the coat of arms.

== History ==
The idea of a province of Central Finland was born at the end of the 19th century. The concept was developed by the district doctor Wolmar Schildt, whose article for Suometar first appeared in 1856. In the late 19th and early 20th centuries, the provincial identity of Central Finland was strengthened by associations, organisations and companies that expanded into the provinces. The Central Finland Province was established in 1960, but was abolished in the county reform of 1997.

A province is a common administrative unit based on the autonomous decision-making power of municipalities and embodies local democracy at the regional level vis-à-vis the state, while a county is a regional administrative unit of the state. The Central Finland covers almost the same geographical area as the former Central Finland Province. At that time, the province of Central Finland was merged with the provinces of Turku and Pori and Vaasa and the northern parts of Tavastia to form the Western Finland Province. The current Central Finland is larger than the former province of Central Finland, as Jämsä was joined with Kuorevesi and part of Längelmäki, which previously belonged to Pirkanmaa. Kuhmoinen was also part of Central Finland until 2021, when it joined the region of Pirkanmaa.

== Historical provinces ==
For history, geography and culture see: Tavastia, Savonia, Ostrobothnia

== Municipalities ==
The region of Central Finland consists of six sub-regions and 22 municipalities, six of which have city status (marked in bold).

=== Municipalities on the map ===
Cities and municipalities of Central Finland.

=== Sub-regions ===
Joutsa sub-region

- Joutsa
- Luhanka (Luhango)

Jyväskylä sub-region

- Hankasalmi
- **Jyväskylä**
- Laukaa (Laukas)
- Muurame
- Petäjävesi
- Toivakka
- Uurainen (Urais)

Jämsä sub-region

- **Jämsä**

Keuruu sub-region

- **Keuruu** (Keuru)
- Multia

Saarijärvi-Viitasaari sub-region

- Kannonkoski
- Karstula
- Kinnula
- Kivijärvi
- Kyyjärvi
- Pihtipudas
- **Saarijärvi**
- **Viitasaari**

Äänekoski sub-region

- Konnevesi
- **Äänekoski**

=== List of municipalities ===
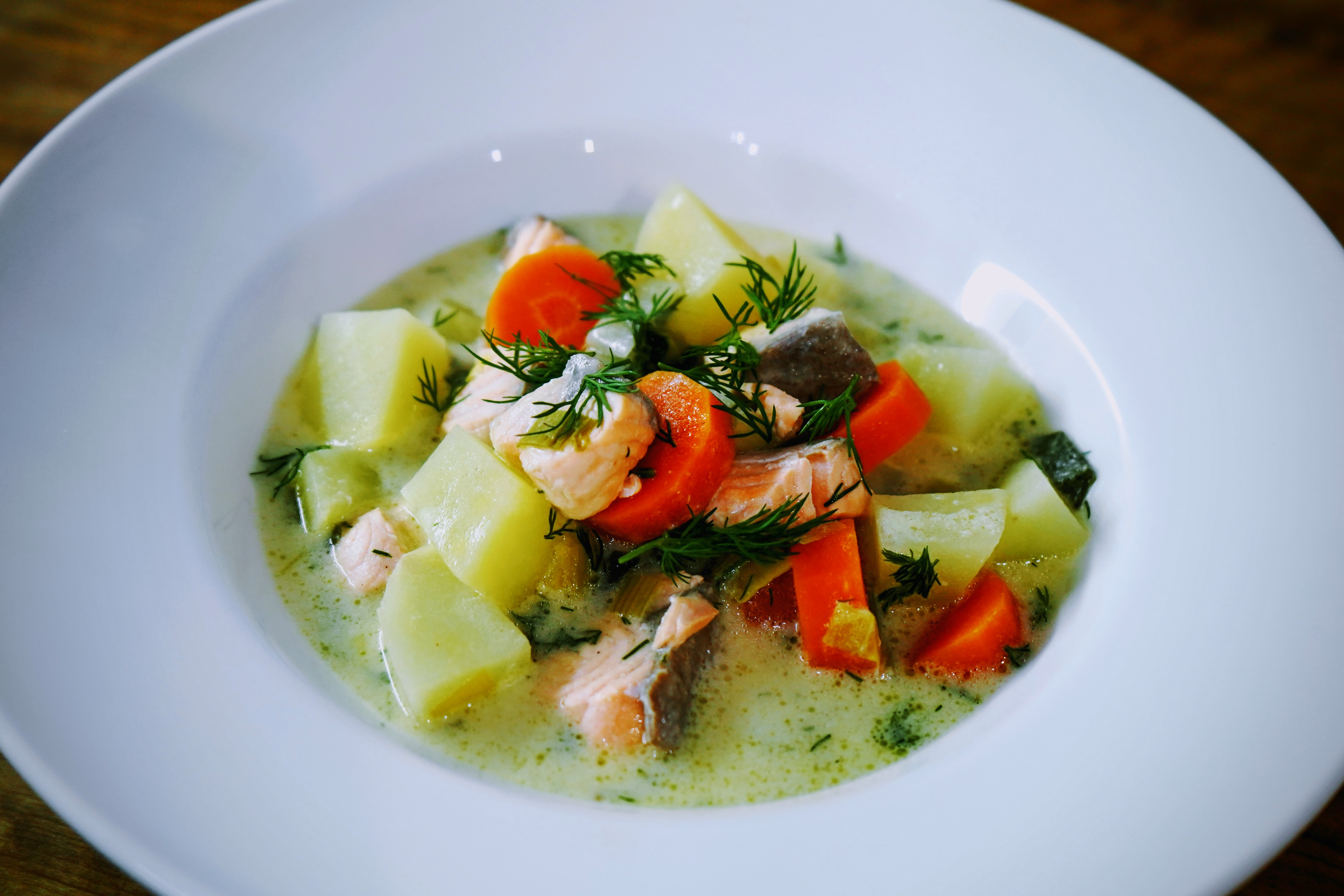
Lohikeitto

Coat of arms	Municipality	Population	Land area (km^{2})	Density (/km^{2})	Finnish speakers	Swedish speakers	Other speakers
coat of arms of Hankasalmi	Hankasalmi	4,436	572	8	97 %	0.2 %	3 %
coat of arms of Joutsa	Joutsa	4,079	867	5	93 %	0.2 %	6 %
coat of arms of Jyväskylä	Jyväskylä	149,895	1,171	128	92 %	0.2 %	8 %
coat of arms of Jämsä	Jämsä	19,020	1,571	12	95 %	0.1 %	5 %
coat of arms of Kannonkoski	Kannonkoski	1,137	445	3	98 %	0 %	2 %
coat of arms of Karstula	Karstula	3,514	887	4	97 %	0 %	3 %
coat of arms of Keuruu	Keuruu	9,014	1,258	7	95 %	0.1 %	5 %
coat of arms of Kinnula	Kinnula	1,472	460	3	98 %	0 %	2 %
coat of arms of Kivijärvi	Kivijärvi	1,001	484	2	99 %	0 %	1 %
coat of arms of Konnevesi	Konnevesi	2,404	513	5	98 %	0 %	2 %
coat of arms of Kyyjärvi	Kyyjärvi	1,129	448	3	97 %	0 %	3 %
coat of arms of Laukaa	Laukaa	18,808	649	29	97 %	0.1 %	2 %
coat of arms of Luhanka	Luhanka	695	215	3	99 %	0 %	1 %
coat of arms Multia	Multia	1,386	733	2	98 %	0 %	2 %
coat of arms of Muurame	Muurame	10,646	144	74	98 %	0.2 %	2 %
coat of arms of Petäjävesi	Petäjävesi	3,511	456	8	98 %	0 %	2 %
coat of arms of Pihtipudas	Pihtipudas	3,676	1,075	3	98 %	0 %	2 %
coat of arms of Saarijärvi	Saarijärvi	8,763	1,252	7	97 %	0.1 %	3 %
coat of arms of Toivakka	Toivakka	2,307	361	6	98 %	0 %	2 %
coat of arms of Uurainen	Uurainen	3,651	348	10	98 %	0 %	2 %
coat of arms of Viitasaari	Viitasaari	5,695	1,249	5	97 %	0 %	3 %
coat of arms of Äänekoski	Äänekoski	17,492	885	20	96 %	0.1 %	3 %
	Total	273,731	15,309	18	93 %	0.1 %	6 %

=== Former municipalities ===
- Äänekosken maalaiskunta (to Äänekoski in 1969)
- Koskenpää (to Jämsänkoski in 1969)
- Pihlajavesi (to Keuruu in 1969)
- Konginkangas (to Äänekoski in 1993)
- Säynätsalo (to Jyväskylä in 1993)
- Sumiainen (to Äänekoski in 2007)
- Suolahti (to Äänekoski in 2007)
- Leivonmäki (to Joutsa in 2008)
- Jämsänkoski (to Jämsä in 2009)
- Jyväskylän maalaiskunta (to Jyväskylä in 2009)
- Korpilahti (to Jyväskylä in 2009)
- Pylkönmäki (to Saarijärvi in 2009)

Kuhmoinen was moved to the Pirkanmaa region in 2021.

The following municipalities were not in Central Finland, but were merged into Central Finnish municipalities:

- Kuorevesi (to Jämsä in 2001)
- Längelmäki (partially to Jämsä in 2007)

== Demographics ==
Population size 1990–2025
Year	Population
1990	254,539
1995	259,778
2000	262,710
2005	266,770
2010	271,083
2015	273,446
2020	272,617
2025	273,731

== Politics ==
For parliamentary elections, the region forms a single electoral district, the Central Finland constituency. As of 2023, the constituency elects 10 of the 200 members of the Parliament of Finland.
