= Lake Keitele =

Lake of Central Finland

Keitele
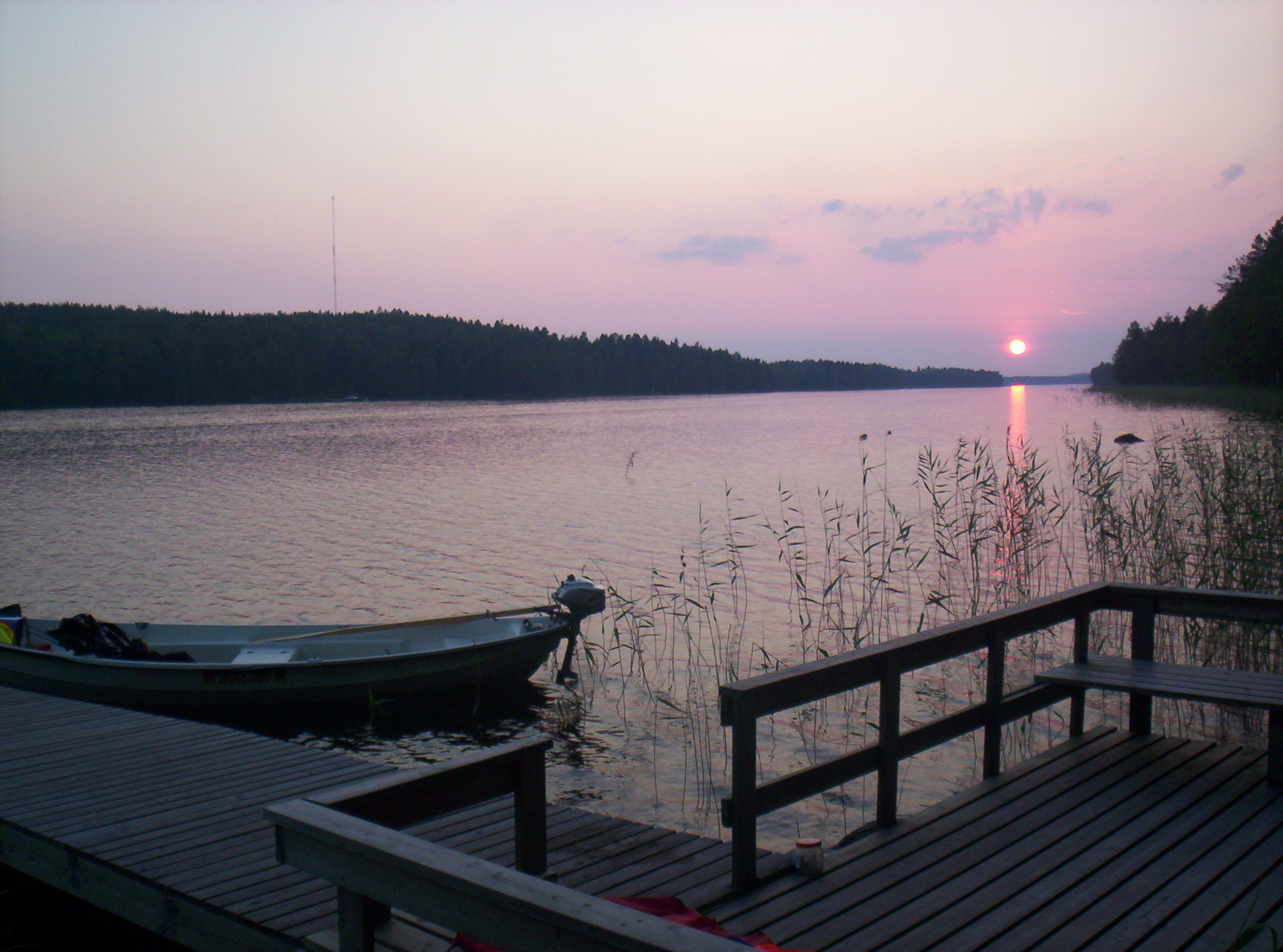
- Sunset on Keitele

- Location within Finland

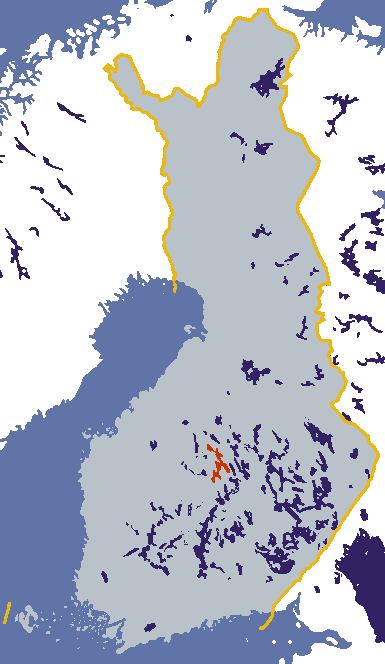
- Location of Keitele.
- Location: Central Finland
- Coordinates: 62°56′N 26°02′E
- Lake type: Natural
- Catchment area: Kymijoki
- Basin countries: Finland
- Surface area: 498.41 km^{2} (192.44 sq mi)
- Average depth: 6.88 m (22.6 ft)
- Max. depth: 66 m (217 ft)
- Water volume: 3.4 km^{3} (2,800,000 acre⋅ft)
- Shore length^{1}: 1,461 km (908 mi)
- Surface elevation: 99.5 m (326 ft)
- Islands: Hautsalo, Pyhänsalo, Jurvansalo, Patasalo
- Settlements: Äänekoski, Sumiainen, Suolahti, Viitasaari
- ^{1} Shore length is not a well-defined measure.

Keitele is a large lake located in Central Finland. With an area of 493.59 km^{2}, it is the 9th largest lake in the country. The lake is divided into three regions, Ylä-, Keski-, and Ala-Keitele, of which Keski-Keitele is the largest. Water in the lake is clear and in excellent condition. The towns of Äänekoski and Viitasaari are located on the shores of Keitele.

The northernmost part of the lake is called Ylä-Keitele. A big part of Ylä-Keitele belongs to Natura 2000 protection program due to its clear water and natural condition.

A leading figure in modern Finnish painting, Akseli Gallen-Kallela first worked at Lake Keitele, in the summer of 1904. This Lake Keitele landscape is his third and most elaborate depiction of the lake, and he exhibited it in Helsinki that same year. The painting is signed with the Swedish form of the artist's name; in later years he used the Finnish form, as below, by which he is best known today. This painting now hangs in the National Gallery, London.

The lake is mentioned prominently in James Church's 2006 novel A Corpse in the Koryo.

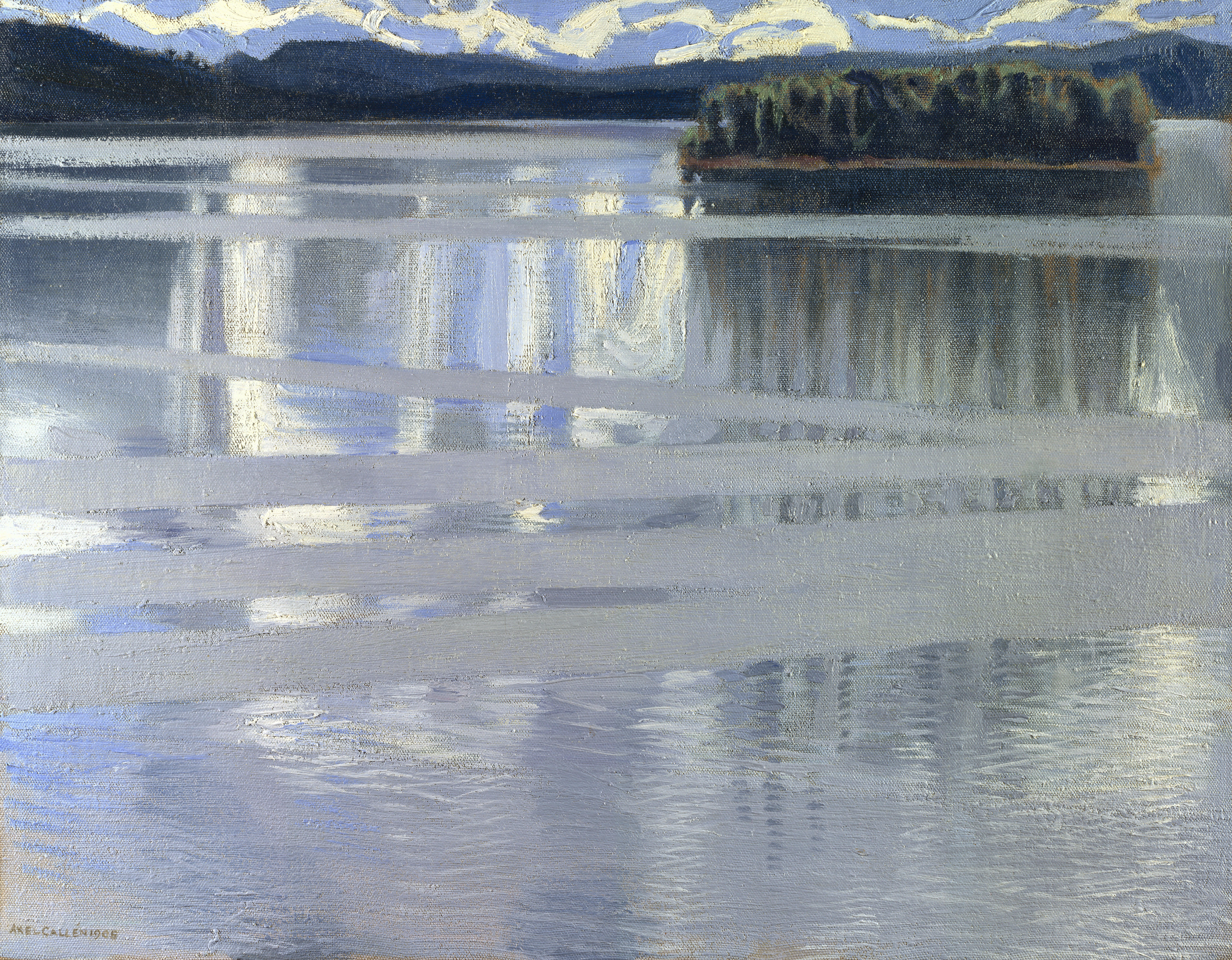
Lake Keitele by Akseli Gallen-Kallela, 1905
