= Suonenjoki =

- Town
- Suonenjoen kaupunki Suonenjoki stad
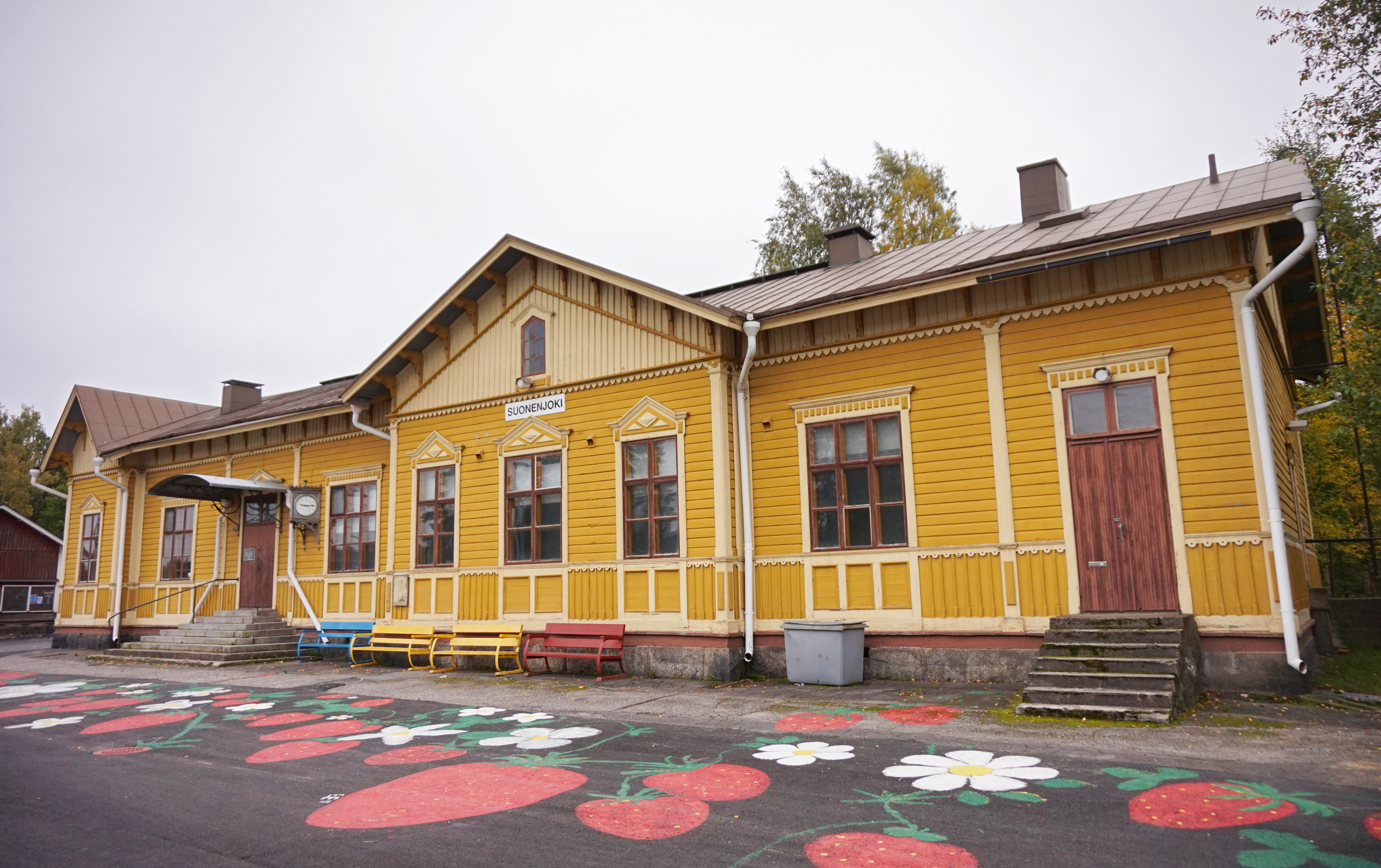
- Suonenjoki railway station

- Coat of arms
- Nickname: The Strawberry Town
- Location of Suonenjoki in Finland
- Interactive map of Suonenjoki
- Coordinates: 62°37.5′N 027°07.5′E
- Country: Finland
- Region: North Savo
- Sub-region: Inner Savo
- Charter: 1865
- Market town: 1967
- City rights: 1977

Government
  - Town manager: Olavi Ruotsalainen

Area (2018-01-01)
  - Total: 862.34 km^{2} (332.95 sq mi)
  - Land: 713.56 km^{2} (275.51 sq mi)
  - Water: 148.78 km^{2} (57.44 sq mi)
  - Rank: 119th largest in Finland

Population (2025-12-31)
  - Total: 6,549
  - Rank: 138th largest in Finland
  - Density: 9.18/km^{2} (23.8/sq mi)

Population by native language
  - Finnish: 95.3% (official)
  - Swedish: 0.2%
  - Others: 4.5%

Population by age
  - 0 to 14: 13%
  - 15 to 64: 54.4%
  - 65 or older: 32.6%
- Time zone: UTC+02:00 (EET)
  - Summer (DST): UTC+03:00 (EEST)
- Website: suonenjoki.fi

Suonenjoki (Finnish pronunciation: [ˈsuo̯nenˌjoki]; literally means "vein's river") is a town and municipality of Finland. It is located in the North Savo region, 50 kilometres (31 mi) southwest of Kuopio.

The town has a population of 6,549 (31 December 2025) and covers an area of 862.34 square kilometres (332.95 sq mi) of which 148.78 km^{2} (57.44 sq mi) is water. The population density is 9.18 inhabitants per square kilometre (23.8/sq mi).

The municipality is unilingually Finnish.

== History ==
Suonenjoki is thought to have served as a milestone in the Treaty of Nöteborg in 1323. In the 16th and 17th centuries, more and more people began to settle in the area, and in the 18th century, a preacher room was established in Suonenjoki, then a chapel. In the current agglomeration, bridges over the river of Suonenjoki were built early, Kruunusilta (literally means "Crowns Bridge") already existed in 1780, and Siioninsilta (means "Zion Bridge") at the beginning of the river was replaced by a bridge in the 1830s.

When Suonenjoki gained municipal rights in 1865, the population was about 4,000. In the same year, Suonenjoki Church, the current church in Suonenjoki was completed, replacing the cramped first church built in the late 18th century. A railway station was built on Suonenjoki in connection with the completion of the Savo Railway (also known as Kouvola–Iisalmi railway) in 1889. In the early 20th century, the sawmill industry became the most important industry in the area. Strawberry cultivation became more widespread from the 1940s, and Suonenjoki became known as "the Strawberry Town". The Suonenjoki co-educational school began operations in 1930, moving to its current high school building in 1950.

== Geography ==
The neighbouring municipalities of Suonenjoki are Rautalampi to the west, Tervo to the northwest, Kuopio to the north, Leppävirta to the east, and Pieksämäki to the south on the South Savo side. Suonenjoki River flows through the town from Lake Suontee to Lake Iisvesi. Near the city center is the 10-kilometer-long and at most a couple of kilometers wide scenic Lintharju, which is also part of the European Union's Natura 2000 conservation program.

=== Villages ===
- Herrala
- Hulkkola
- Jauhomäki
- Karkkola
- Kukkola
- Kutumäki
- Kutunkylä
- Kuvansi
- Käpylä
- Kärkkäälä
- Lempyy
- Liedemäki
- Luukkola
- Lyytilänmäki
- Markkala
- Nuutila
- Piispalanmäki
- Pörölänmäki
- Rajalanniemi
- Rieponlahti
- Sydänmaa
- Toholahti
- Tyyrinmäki
- Vauhkola
- Vehvilä
- Viippero
- Jalkala
- Karsikonmäki
- Suontee
- Suihkola
- Kolikkoinmäki
- Kinnula

== Culture ==
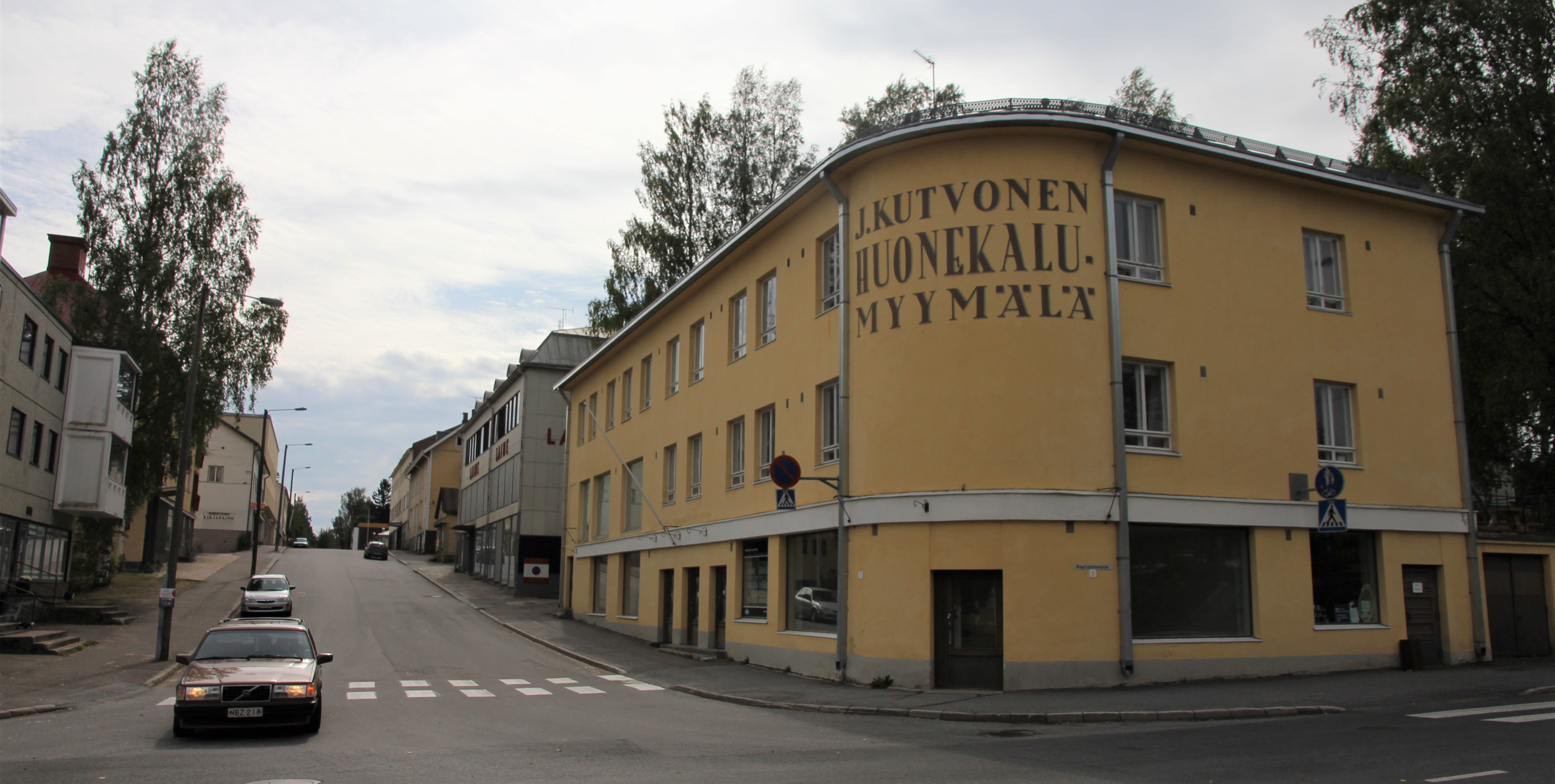
J. Kutvonen Furniture Store (Finnish: J. Kutvonen Huonekalumyymälä), founded by Julius Kutvonen in years 1933-34, at Asemakatu in the Suonenjoki centre

Suonenjoki is famous for its strawberries giving the town its coat of arms, three strawberry leaves. It is also known as "the Strawberry Town". Many foreigners, mainly from Ukraine and Russia, come to Suonenjoki in summer to work on strawberry farms. That makes Suonenjoki the most international town of Finland at summer. There is a party in Suonenjoki in July called Mansikkakarnevaalit, "Strawberry Carnival". There was also a rock festival named Jörisrock, the last "Jöris" was held in 2006. Nowadays, "Jöris" has been replaced by a music event called Iisrock.

There is also three museums, library and artshow.

Newspaper Sisä-Savo is published in Suonenjoki and nearby municipalities.

== Transportation ==
Suonenjoki is situated between two important cities, Kuopio and Jyväskylä, and the main road 9 (E63) between those cities goes through Suonenjoki. The railway between Kuopio and Helsinki goes also through the center of Suonenjoki.

== Notable people ==
- Veijo Baltzar, author and visual artist
- Aatu Hämäläinen, ice hockey player
- Kalle Jalkanen, cross-country skier
- Erkki Junkkarinen, singer
- Lauri Kerminen, volleyball player
- Rakel Liekki, freelance journalist and former pornstar
- Rauno Miettinen, Nordic combined skier
- Iiro Pakarinen, ice hockey player in NHL
- Markku Rossi, politician
- Liisa Suihkonen, cross-country skier
- Kari Tapio, country & western and schlager singer

== See also ==
- Finnish national road 69
- Suonenjoki rail collision
