= Suolahti =

- Former municipality
- Suolahden kaupunki Suolahti stad
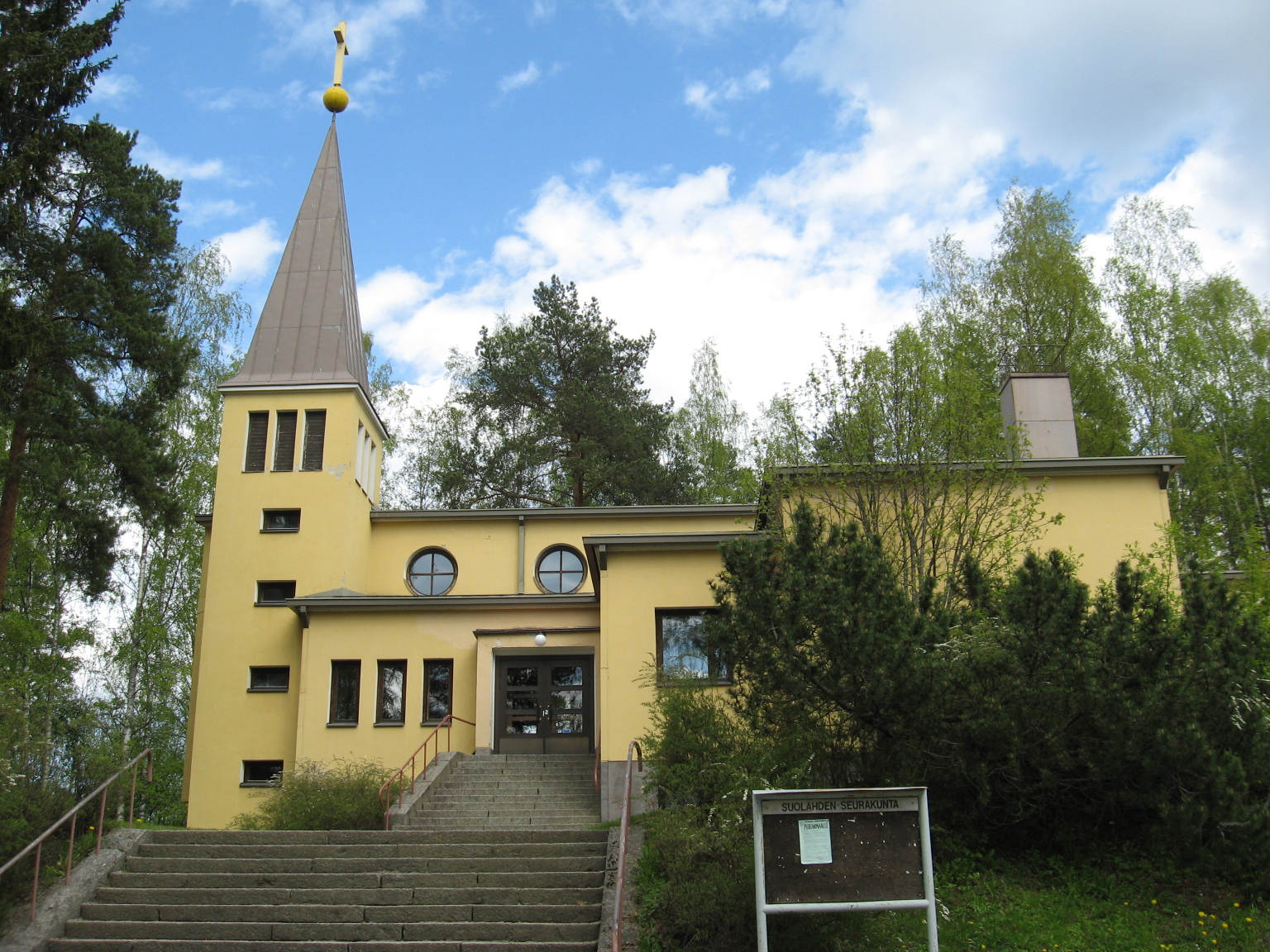
- Suolahti Church

- Seal

- Location of Suolahti in Finland
- Coordinates: 62°33′50″N 025°51′10″E
- Country: Finland
- Region: Central Finland
- Established: 1932
- Town privileges: 1977
- Merged into Äänekoski: 2007
- Seat: Äänekoski

Area
  - Total: 67.48 km^{2} (26.05 sq mi)
  - Land: 57.73 km^{2} (22.29 sq mi)
  - Water: 9.75 km^{2} (3.76 sq mi)

Population (2006-12-31)
  - Total: 5,380
  - Density: 93.2/km^{2} (241/sq mi)

Population by age
  - 0 to 14: 16.36%
  - 15 to 64: 66.99%
  - 65 or older: 16.65%
- Time zone: UTC+2 (EET)
  - Summer (DST): UTC+3 (EEST)
- Website: www.aanekoski.fi

Suolahti is a former town and municipality of Finland. It is located next to Lake Keitele in the province of Western Finland and is part of the Central Finland region. Suolahti was merged into Äänekoski together with Sumiainen in 2007.

== History ==
The village was initially known as Paadentaipale; the first mentions of the current name come from are from the 16th century. The opening of the railroad in 1898 industrialized Suolahti and increased the waterborne traffic on Keitele, for which Suolahti provided a railway harbour at its south end. The same year, a steam-mill started operating which was soon followed by other industrial facilities. This sped up population growth and urban development. In the first three decades of the 20th century, the population increased to two thousand. It gained town status in 1977.

== Sister cities ==
Prior to a 2007 consolidation with Sumiainen to make Äänekoski, Suolahti was twinned with:

- Borovichi, Novgorod Oblast, Russia (status unknown)

== Notable people ==
- Jack Smack, guitarist
- Marko Vanhanen (born 1968), inventor and YouTuber
