= Valio =

Dairy manufacturer

Valio Ltd
- Type: Limited company
- Industry: Dairy; Food
- Founded: 1905
- Headquarters: Helsinki, Finland
- Key people: Annikka Hurme (CEO)
- Revenue: ▲2,423 million EUR (2025)
- Operating income: ▲101.6 million EUR (2025)
- Net income: ▲75.2 million EUR (2025)
- Number of employees: 4,288 (average, 2025)
- Website: www.valio.com

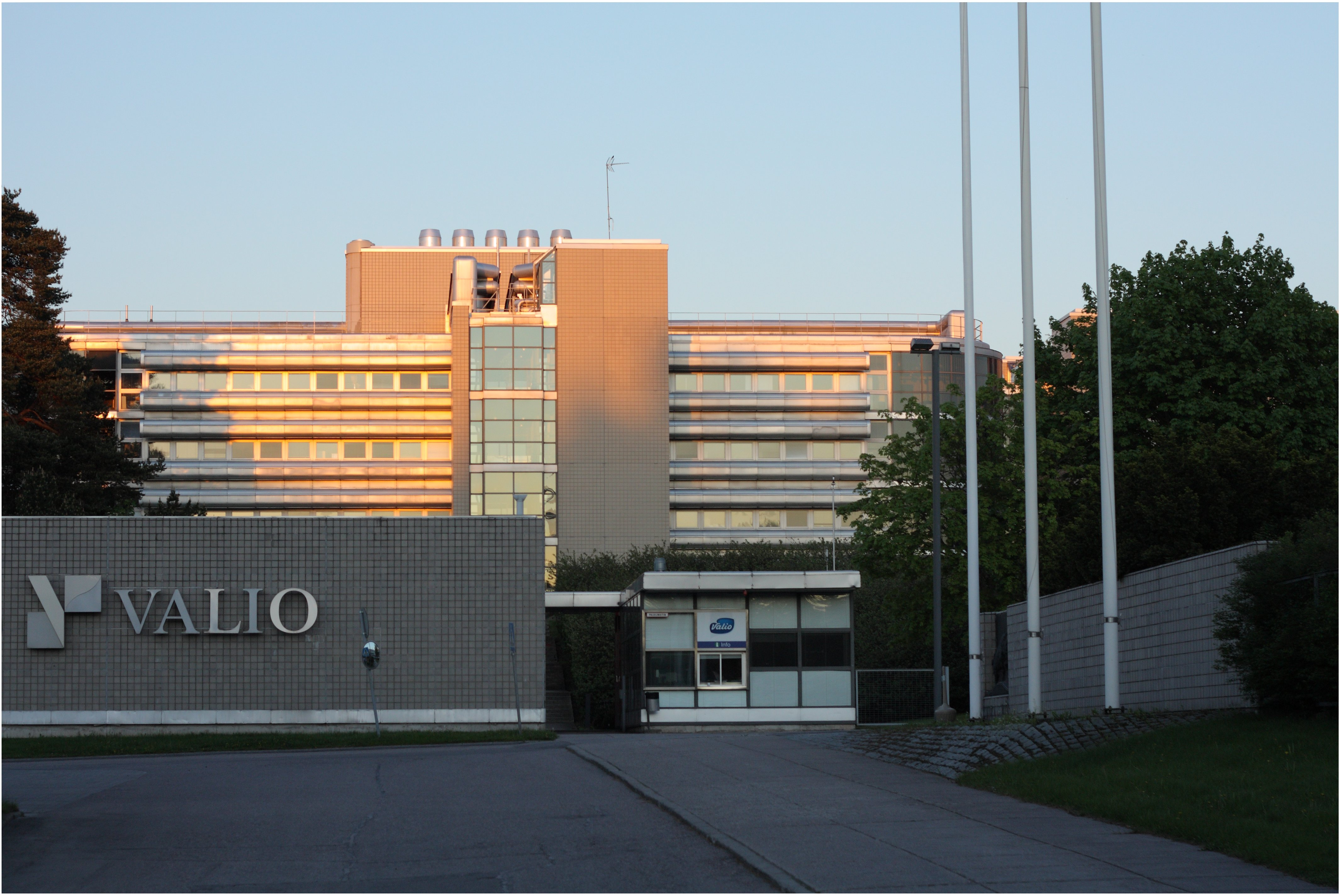
The Valio head office in Pitäjänmäki, Helsinki

Valio Ltd (Finnish: Valio Oy) is a Finnish dairy and food company founded in 1905. Valio is a significant participant in the global dairy ingredients market and Finland’s largest milk processor, with Valio dairy farmers producing about 80% of the country’s milk. Valio’s product development is based on the work of Nobel Prize–winning chemist A. I. Virtanen; the company holds more than 300 patents in 50 countries.

Valio manufactures milk‑ and plant‑based food products and operates in both consumer and wholesale markets. Valio holds a joint ownership stake in Suomen Lantakaasu Oy, which produces biogas from dairy farm manure as part of circular economy initiatives.

In 2025, Valio reported net sales of EUR 2.4 billion, and the value of its exports from Finland reached approximately EUR 580.8 million. Valio exports food products for consumers and the food industry to around 50 countries. Its exports include butter and milk powders for industrial use, as well as snack products, cheeses, and plant‑based products for consumers. Around one quarter of Finland’s food exports consist of Valio products, and nearly all Finnish dairy product exports originate from Valio.

Valio is owned by 13 dairy cooperatives and sources its milk through procurement agreements with five of them, representing approximately 3,200 dairy farms. Valio employs approximately 25,000 people at dairy farms and around 4,200 professionals at Valio.

== History ==
Valio was founded in 1905 by 17 co-operative dairies. The original name of the company was Voivienti-osuusliike Valio r.l, or 'Butter Export Cooperative Valio'. The company was originally based in Hanko and the most important market was England.

Valio's activities expanded from butter to other dairy products in 1909. Exports of products such as processed cheese to Germany, Poland, Czechoslovakia, France, Norway, Belgium and the United States began in the 1920s and expanded rapidly during that decade. In 1933, Valio started production of Koskenlaskija Finnish brand of processed cheese in Helsinki. In the United States, Valio sold Pasteurized Process Gruyere Cheese in a wooden box, with graphics on 2 sides.

Virtanen, who received the Nobel Prize in Chemistry in 1945, was an employee of Valio. The prize was given "for his research and inventions in agricultural and nutrition chemistry, especially for his fodder preservation method". Virtanen's work preserved nutrients in hay, which lead cows to produce more nutritious milk.

Valio began exporting milk powder, cheese and butter to several international markets in the 1950s, including countries such as Algeria and Morocco. Valio’s cheeses gained popularity particularly in Germany and Italy. During the same decade, Valio also entered the United States market by exporting Emmental/Swiss cheese under the name “Cheeses from Finland”. In the late 1970s, the Finlandia brand was developed and introduced to the market in the northeastern United States. In 1992, Valio acquired the Finlandia brand and subsequently expanded its distribution nationwide across the United States.

In 1986, Valio began sharing its dairy production expertise and selling related equipment to agricultural leaders in China. During the 1990s, Valio’s DEMI™ demineralised whey powder was supplied to markets including China, Taiwan and South Korea, where it was used in products such as chocolate and ice cream, as well as globally by infant formula manufacturers. By 2001, Valio had established a dedicated office in Shanghai responsible for the sales of Valio’s ingredients and technologies.

In 2001, Valio launched a lactose-free milk drink which is not sweet like HYLA milk but has the fresh taste of ordinary milk. Valio patented the chromatographic separation method to remove lactose. Valio also markets these products in Sweden, Estonia, and the United States, where the company says ultrafiltration is used.

In Belgium the products were present under the Valio brand until 2013. The name changed to 'Dilea' after Valio sold their Belgian subsidiary in 2012.

Valio sold its ice cream activity to overseas company Nestlé in 2004. Nestlé also received the right to use the Valiojäätelö name for 10 years, ending in 2014. It was soon transferred into the Nestle/R&R Ice Cream joint venture Froneri Finland.

In 2005, Valion Jäätelöbaari (Valio Ice Cream Bar), designed by Paola Suhonen, was opened in Kamppi Center, Helsinki.

In early 2018, Valio launched the Valio Oddlygood® brand and introduced its first oat‑based products. Oddlygood® has since developed into an international brand offering a broad range of plant‑based products, including oat drinks and alternatives to cheese, yogurts and desserts.

In 2022, Valio closed all of its business operations in Russia after EU imposed sanctions against Russia.

In early 2022, Valio acquired the Gold&Green® brand along with its product development activities. Gold&Green focuses on plant‑based foods, offering products made primarily from ingredients such as oats, peas and fava beans.

In 2022, Valio established a joint venture with St1 Oy, Suomen Lantakaasu Ltd. The joint venture was part of the practical implementation of Valio’s climate programme. Suomen Lantakaasu Lts supports a circular economy by producing biogas from manure generated by dairy farms.

In 2024, Valio launched Food 2.0, a project aimed at developing the food system of the future and promoting the competitiveness of Finnish food exports. Valio’s role in the project is to lead cooperation within the partner network as well as various research and development initiatives. Business Finland granted €10 million in funding for the project. By 2026, the Food 2.0 ecosystem has grown to over 200 members.

In 2025, Valio acquired Raisio plc’s plant protein business, including the Härkis® and Beanit® fava bean brands and the related fixed assets. The acquisition included the production equipment of the Kauhava factory manufacturing plant‑based protein products, and 16 employees transferred to Valio as part of the transaction.

== Ownership ==
Valio is owned by dairy cooperatives comprising 3,200 dairy farms. Through this ownership structure, Valio distributes its operating profits to Finnish dairy farmers.

Valio dairy farms produce around 80 percent of Finnish milk. In Finland, Valio sources its milk from its owner farms, while in Estonia milk is sourced from local producers in accordance with defined quality requirements.

== Operations ==
Valio operates production plants in Finland and Estonia. All products manufactured for sale in Finland and for export are produced using Finnish milk at the company's 13 production plants. In Finland, the milk used in production is sourced from Valio’s Finnish owner‑entrepreneur farms, while in Estonia milk is sourced from partner producers whose quality is subject to ongoing monitoring. Valio subsidiaries operate in Sweden, China, and the United States. Valio exports its products to around 50 countries. Its exports include milk and whey powders and butter for the food and baby food industries, as well as consumer products.

Valio’s innovation activity has been influenced by scientific research, including the work of Nobel Prize–winning chemist Artturi Ilmari Virtanen, who previously led the company’s laboratory. The company continues to emphasize product development and technological innovation and holds more than 300 patents worldwide.

== Sustainability ==
Valio states that responsibility for the environment, the economy, people, and society is integrated into its operations. According to the company, the cornerstones of its sustainability approach include the cooperative ownership model, animal welfare, and sustainable milk production. Valio has outlined efforts aimed at reducing the environmental and climate impacts of food production, including emission reductions, the expansion of carbon sinks, the promotion of biodiversity, and the development of circular economy solutions.

Animal welfare is described by the company as a central element of its operations. Valio has indicated a focus on animal health, living conditions, and nutrition at Valio dairy farms. Responsible operations at Valio also include food safety, resource‑efficient production, and packaging development. According to the company, packaging is designed to protect product safety and shelf life while keeping environmental impacts as low as possible. Valio publishes an annual sustainability report covering environmental, social, and animal‑welfare‑related topics.
