= Sumiainen =

- Former municipality
- Sumiaisten kunta Sumiais kommun
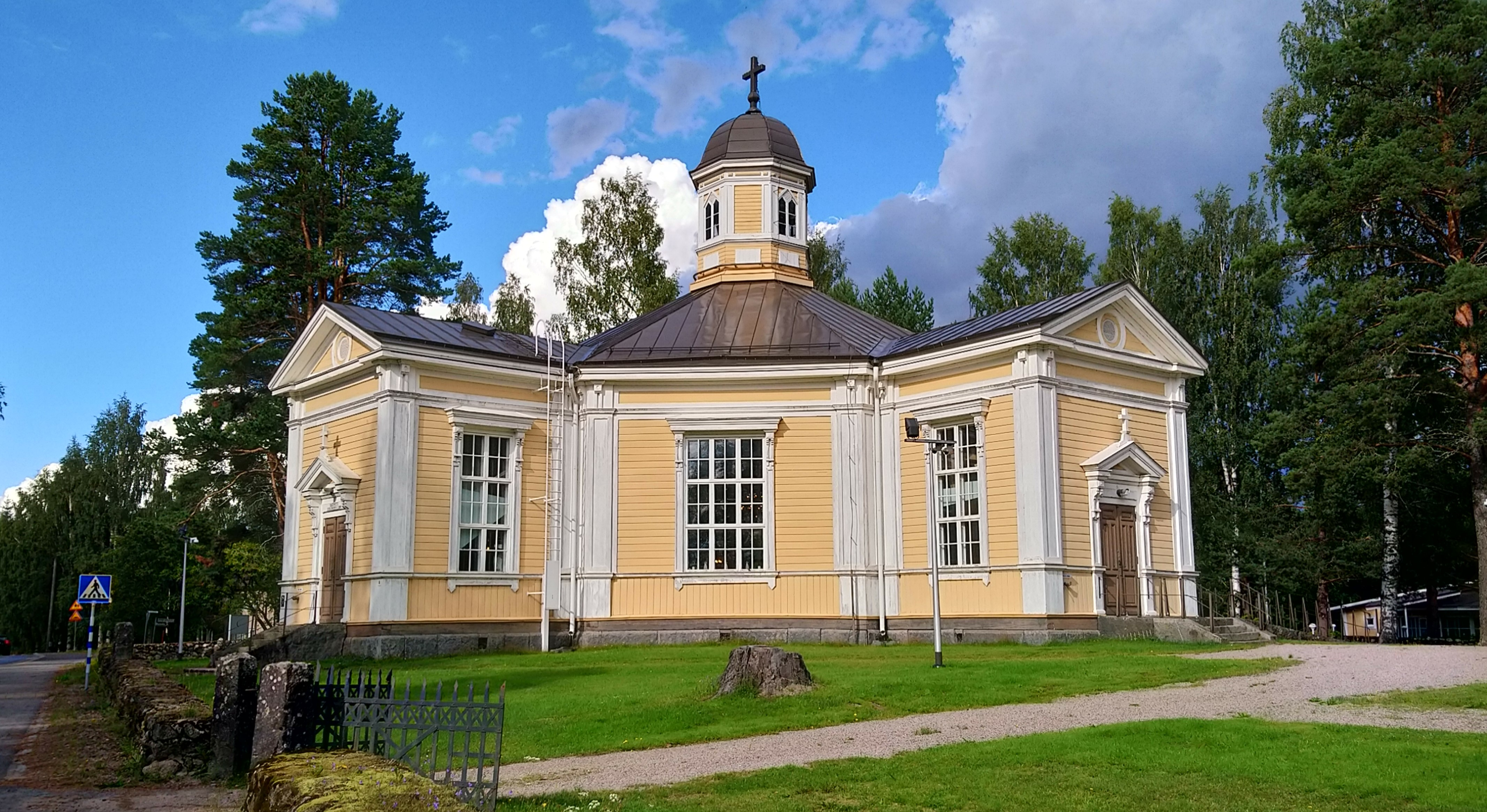
- Sumiainen Church

- Coat of arms

- Location of Sumiainen in Finland
- Coordinates: 62°39′25″N 26°02′50″E
- Country: Finland
- Region: Central Finland
- Established: 1868
- Merged into Äänekoski: 2007
- Seat: Sumiaisten kirkonkylä

Area
  - Land: 229.58 km^{2} (88.64 sq mi)
  - Water: 78.77 km^{2} (30.41 sq mi)

Population (2006-12-31)
  - Total: 1,303

Sumiainen is a former municipality of Finland.

It is located in the province of Western Finland and is part of the Central Finland region. The municipality had a population of 1,293 (2003) and covered an area of 307.93 km^{2} of which 77.34 km^{2} is water. The population density was 5.6 inhabitants per km^{2}.

Sumiainen consolidated to Äänekoski together with Suolahti in 2007.

The municipality was unilingually Finnish. The municipality was also known as "Sumiais" in Swedish. The Swedish name is now considered outdated according to the Institute for the Languages of Finland.

The river Kuokanjoki is located to the south of the village, and is one of the world's shortest rivers.

== History ==
The toponym Sumiainen was first mentioned in 1442 as Sumiais, referring to the nearby lake. The settlement was established sometime in the 16th century, when it was a part of the Rautalampi parish. It became a part of the Laukaa parish after its establishment in 1628. Sumiainen was separated from Laukaa in 1868. It remained separate until 2007, when it was consolidated with Äänekoski together with Suolahti.

== People born in Sumiainen ==
- Matti Pietinen (1859 – 1918)
- Ilmari Sormunen (1896 – 1980)
