= 2022–23 Nitro Rallycross Championship =

Rallycross racing competition

2022–23 Nitro Rallycross season
- Nitro Rallycross

Season
- Races: 10
- Start date: June 18, 2022
- End date: March 19, 2023

Awards
- Drivers' champion: (Sweden) Robin Larsson

The 2022–23 Nitro Rallycross Championship was the second season of Nitro Rallycross (Nitro RX) competition.

Series founder Travis Pastrana entered as the defending champion. The season saw the debut of the Group E class for the new FC1-X car.

== Schedule ==
The full schedule was revealed on March 29, 2022. After exclusively competing in North America in 2021, the series expanded to include races in six countries across two calendar years for its second season. A round at the KymiRing in Finland was canceled due to the track's financial problems. On November 7, 2022, it was announced that the round at Wild Horse Pass would be a double header, while the round in Saudi Arabia was removed from the schedule on the series' website. On January 13, 2023, the series announced that the finale would be a double header, held again at Glen Helen Raceway in California. Due to snowmelt issues with the track in Calgary, the initially planned championship round was cancelled, and a non-championship round was held instead. The season finale at Glen Helen then became a triple header for the Group E class.

Rnd	Event	Date	Venue	Class	Winner	Team	Report
1	NRX of England	June 18–19, 2022	Lydden Hill Race Circuit, Wootton	Group E	(Sweden) Robin Larsson	(United States) Dreyer & Reinbold Racing JC	Report
1	NRX of England	June 18–19, 2022	Lydden Hill Race Circuit, Wootton	Supercar	(Jamaica) Fraser McConnell	(Finland) Betomik Racing	Report
1	NRX of England	June 18–19, 2022	Lydden Hill Race Circuit, Wootton	NEXT (Day 1)	(Sweden) Casper Jansson	(Sweden) OMSE	Report
1	NRX of England	June 18–19, 2022	Lydden Hill Race Circuit, Wootton	NEXT (Day 2)	(Sweden) Simon Olofsson	(Sweden) STS RX	Report
1	NRX of England	June 18–19, 2022	Lydden Hill Race Circuit, Wootton	Crosscar (Day 1)	(Finland) Pasi Penttinen	(Finland) GRŽ Race	Report
1	NRX of England	June 18–19, 2022	Lydden Hill Race Circuit, Wootton	Crosscar (Day 2)	(Sweden) Sebastian Enholm	(Sweden) Enholm Motorsport	Report
2	NRX of Sweden	July 30–31, 2022	Strängnäs Motorstadion, Strängnäs	Group E	(Norway) Andreas Bakkerud	(United States) Dreyer & Reinbold Racing JC	Report
2	NRX of Sweden	July 30–31, 2022	Strängnäs Motorstadion, Strängnäs	Supercar (Day 1)	(Jamaica) Fraser McConnell	(Finland) Betomik Racing	Report
2	NRX of Sweden	July 30–31, 2022	Strängnäs Motorstadion, Strängnäs	Supercar (Day 2)	(Switzerland) Yuri Belevsky	(Germany) Volland Racing	Report
2	NRX of Sweden	July 30–31, 2022	Strängnäs Motorstadion, Strängnäs	NEXT (Day 1)	(Finland) Tommi Hallman	(Finland) SET Promotion	Report
2	NRX of Sweden	July 30–31, 2022	Strängnäs Motorstadion, Strängnäs	NEXT (Day 2)	(Finland) Tommi Hallman	(Finland) SET Promotion	Report
2	NRX of Sweden	July 30–31, 2022	Strängnäs Motorstadion, Strängnäs	Crosscar (Day 1)	(Finland) Riku Huuka	(Finland) GRŽ Race	Report
2	NRX of Sweden	July 30–31, 2022	Strängnäs Motorstadion, Strängnäs	Crosscar (Day 2)	(Sweden) Sebastian Enholm	(Sweden) Enholm Motorsport	Report
3	NRX of Minnesota	October 1–2, 2022	ERX Motor Park, Elk River	Group E	(United States) Travis Pastrana	(United States) Vermont SportsCar	Report
3	NRX of Minnesota	October 1–2, 2022	ERX Motor Park, Elk River	NEXT (Day 1)	(Finland) Tommi Hallman	(Finland) SET Promotion	Report
3	NRX of Minnesota	October 1–2, 2022	ERX Motor Park, Elk River	NEXT (Day 2)	(Finland) Tommi Hallman	(Finland) SET Promotion	Report
4	NRX of California	October 29–30, 2022	Glen Helen Raceway, San Bernardino	Group E	(Jamaica) Fraser McConnell	(United States) Dreyer & Reinbold Racing	Report
4	NRX of California	October 29–30, 2022	Glen Helen Raceway, San Bernardino	NEXT (Day 1)	(United States) George Megennis	(Sweden) #YELLOWSQUAD	Report
4	NRX of California	October 29–30, 2022	Glen Helen Raceway, San Bernardino	NEXT (Day 2)	(Sweden) Casper Jansson	(Sweden) OMSE	Report
5-6	NRX of Arizona	November 11–13, 2022	Wild Horse Pass Motorsports Park, Chandler	Group E (Day 1)	(United States) Travis Pastrana	(United States) Vermont SportsCar	Report
5-6	NRX of Arizona	November 11–13, 2022	Wild Horse Pass Motorsports Park, Chandler	Group E (Day 2)	(Sweden) Robin Larsson	(United States) Dreyer & Reinbold Racing JC	Report
5-6	NRX of Arizona	November 11–13, 2022	Wild Horse Pass Motorsports Park, Chandler	NEXT (Day 1)	(Sweden) Casper Jansson	(Sweden) OMSE	Report
5-6	NRX of Arizona	November 11–13, 2022	Wild Horse Pass Motorsports Park, Chandler	NEXT (Day 2)	(United States) George Megennis	(Sweden) #YELLOWSQUAD	Report
7	NRX of Quebec	January 20-21, 2023	Circuit Trois-Rivières, Trois-Rivières	Group E	(Sweden) Oliver Eriksson	(Sweden) OMSE	Report
NC	NRX of Alberta	February 4–5, 2023	Stampede Grandstand, Calgary	Group E	(Sweden) Kevin Eriksson	(Sweden) OMSE	Report
NC	NRX of Alberta	February 4–5, 2023	Stampede Grandstand, Calgary	NEXT (Day 1)	(Sweden) Casper Jansson	(Sweden) OMSE	Report
NC	NRX of Alberta	February 4–5, 2023	Stampede Grandstand, Calgary	NEXT (Day 2)	(Sweden) Casper Jansson	(Sweden) OMSE	Report
8-9-10	(California) Nitro RX 2022–23 Series Finale	March 17-19, 2023	Glen Helen Raceway, San Bernardino	Group E (Day 1)	(Norway) Andreas Bakkerud	(United States) Dreyer & Reinbold Racing JC	Report
8-9-10	(California) Nitro RX 2022–23 Series Finale	March 17-19, 2023	Glen Helen Raceway, San Bernardino	Group E (Day 2)	(United States) Travis Pastrana	(United States) Vermont SportsCar	Report
8-9-10	(California) Nitro RX 2022–23 Series Finale	March 17-19, 2023	Glen Helen Raceway, San Bernardino	Group E (Day 3)	(Sweden) Robin Larsson	(United States) Dreyer & Reinbold Racing JC	Report
8-9-10	(California) Nitro RX 2022–23 Series Finale	March 17-19, 2023	Glen Helen Raceway, San Bernardino	NEXT (Day 1)	(Finland) Tommi Hallman	(Finland) SET Promotion	Report
8-9-10	(California) Nitro RX 2022–23 Series Finale	March 17-19, 2023	Glen Helen Raceway, San Bernardino	NEXT (Day 2)	(Finland) Tommi Hallman	(Finland) SET Promotion	Report
Cancelled Races
C	NRX of Finland	August 27–28, 2022	KymiRing, Kausala				
C	NRX of Saudi Arabia	December 10–11, 2022	Was not announced				

== Drivers ==
=== Group E ===
Manufacturer	Car	Team	No.	Driver	Rounds
OMSE
OMSE	FC1-X	(United States) Dreyer & Reinbold Racing	3	(Sweden) Johan Kristoffersson	2
OMSE	FC1-X	(United States) Dreyer & Reinbold Racing	15	(United States) Andrew Carlson	3
OMSE	FC1-X	(United States) Dreyer & Reinbold Racing	35	(Jamaica) Fraser McConnell	All
OMSE	FC1-X	(United States) Dreyer & Reinbold Racing JC	4	(Sweden) Robin Larsson	All
OMSE	FC1-X	(United States) Dreyer & Reinbold Racing JC	13	(Norway) Andreas Bakkerud	All
OMSE	FC1-X	(United States) Dreyer & Reinbold Racing JC	52	(Norway) Ole Christian Veiby	1–2
OMSE	FC1-X	(Sweden) Olsbergs MSE	2	(United States) Austin Cindric	5–6
OMSE	FC1-X	(Sweden) Olsbergs MSE	9	(United States) Chase Elliott	5–6
OMSE	FC1-X	(Sweden) Olsbergs MSE	16	(Sweden) Oliver Eriksson	All
OMSE	FC1-X	(Sweden) Olsbergs MSE	23	(Sweden) Kevin Eriksson	3–10
OMSE	FC1-X	(Sweden) Olsbergs MSE	68	(Finland) Niclas Grönholm	1–2
OMSE	FC1-X	(Sweden) Olsbergs MSE	71	(Mexico) Benito Guerra	9-10
OMSE	FC1-X	(United States) Vermont SportsCar	21	(United States) Conner Martell	All
OMSE	FC1-X	(United States) Vermont SportsCar	199	(United States) Travis Pastrana	All
OMSE	FC1-X	(United Kingdom) Xite Energy Racing	12	(Germany) Timo Scheider	8-10
OMSE	FC1-X	(United Kingdom) Xite Energy Racing	22	(United Kingdom) Jenson Button	3–4
OMSE	FC1-X	(United Kingdom) Xite Energy Racing	42	(United Kingdom) Oliver Bennett	All
OMSE	FC1-X	(United Kingdom) Xite Energy Racing	62	(United Kingdom) Kris Meeke	1–2, 5–7

=== Supercar Europe ===
Manufacturer	Team	Car	No.	Driver	Rounds
Audi	(Germany) Volland Racing	Audi S1	95	(Switzerland) Yury Belevskiy	All
Citroën	(United Kingdom) Tristan Ovendon Mr	Citroën DS3	72	(United Kingdom) Tristan Ovendon	1
Ford	(Republic of Ireland) Team RX Racing	Ford Fiesta	13	(Republic of Ireland) Patrick O'Donovan	All
Hyundai	(Finland) Betomik Racing	Hyundai i20 Mk2	35	(Jamaica) Fraser McConnell	All
Volvo	(United Kingdom) Flitspeed Racing	Volvo C30	47	(United Kingdom) Dominic Flitney	1
Volkswagen	(Sweden) Eklund Motorsport	Volkswagen Beetle	76	(Sweden) Per Eklund	2
Volkswagen	(Sweden) Kristoffersson Motorsport	Volkswagen Polo	17	(Sweden) Gustav Bergström	2

=== NEXT Europe ===
Manufacturer	Car	Team	No.	Driver	Rounds
OMSE	Olsbergs MSE SuperCar Lites	(Sweden) STS RX	5	(United States) Kyle Schwartz	1
OMSE	Olsbergs MSE SuperCar Lites	(Sweden) STS RX	52	(Sweden) Simon Olofsson	All
OMSE	Olsbergs MSE SuperCar Lites	(Sweden) #YELLOWSQUAD	9	(United States) George Megennis	All
OMSE	Olsbergs MSE SuperCar Lites	(Sweden) JC Raceteknik	19	(Sweden) Mikaela Åhlin-Kottulinsky	All
OMSE	Olsbergs MSE SuperCar Lites	(Sweden) KJS RX	22	(Sweden) Mattis Jansson	2
OMSE	Olsbergs MSE SuperCar Lites	(Sweden) OMSE	36	(Sweden) Casper Jansson	All
OMSE	Olsbergs MSE SuperCar Lites	(Sweden) OMSE	88	(Norway) Ole Henry Steinsholt	1
OMSE	Olsbergs MSE SuperCar Lites	(United States) Dreyer & Reinbold Racing	55	(United States) Lane Vacala	All
OMSE	Olsbergs MSE SuperCar Lites	(Sweden) Endlunds Motorsport	60	(Sweden) Martin Enlund	2
OMSE	Olsbergs MSE SuperCar Lites	(Finland) SET Promotion	87	(Finland) Tommi Hallman	All

=== Crosscar ===
Manufacturer	Team	Car	No.	Driver	Rounds
Speedcar	(Finland) GRŽ Race	Speedcar Wonder	2	(Finland) Riku Huuhka	All
Speedcar	(Finland) GRŽ Race	Speedcar Wonder	6	(Finland) Pasi Penttinen	All
Speedcar	(Sweden) Jimmie Österberg	Speedcar Wonder	11	(Sweden) Jimmie Österberg	All
Speedcar	(Sweden) Fredrik Enholm	Speedcar Wonder	12	(Sweden) Frida Enholm	All
Speedcar	(Sweden) Fredrik Enholm	Speedcar Wonder	124	(Sweden) Sebastian Enholm	All
Speedcar	(Sweden) Car Control	Speedcar Wonder	44	(Latvia) Kalle Göthesson	All
Speedcar	(Sweden) Car Control	Speedcar Wonder	67	(Sweden) Isac Egonsson	All
Speedcar	(Latvia) Ronald Baldinš	Speedcar Wonder	81	(Latvia) Ronald Baldinš	All
Speedcar	(Norway) Thomas Eek Murstad	Speedcar Wonder	110	(Norway) Thomas Eek Murstad	All
Speedcar	(Sweden) JC Raceteknik	Speedcar Wonder	199	(Sweden) Alex Gustafsson	All

== Driver standings ==
=== Group E ===
Rank	Driver	(United Kingdom) LYD	(Sweden) STR	(Minnesota) ERX	(California) HLN	(Arizona) WHP1	(Arizona) WHP2	(Quebec) CTR	(California) HLN2	(California) HLN3	(California) HLN4	Pts
1	(Sweden) Robin Larsson	1^{4}	2^{3}	2^{4}	2^{1}	5^{1}	1^{3}	3^{2}	8	4	1	403
2	(Norway) Andreas Bakkerud	2^{3}	1^{4}	4	3^{2}	3^{2}	8^{1}	7^{3}	1	3	3	371
3	(Jamaica) Fraser McConnell	4^{1}	4^{2}	3	1^{4}	6	6^{3}	4^{4}	2	9	2	348
4	(United States) Travis Pastrana	7^{2}	9^{1}	1^{2}	8^{1}	1^{4}	5^{2}	DSQ^{1}	6	1	6	330
5	(Sweden) Oliver Eriksson	6^{1}	8^{4}	8^{2}	6^{3}	4^{1}	2^{4}	1^{2}	4	7	4	313
6	(United States) Conner Martell	10^{1}	6^{3}	7^{1}	7^{1}	2^{1}	10^{1}	6	7	5	7	250
7	(Sweden) Kevin Eriksson			10^{3}	5^{2}	8^{1}	4^{1}	2^{1}	5	2	8	245
8	(United Kingdom) Oliver Bennett	9^{1}	10	5^{1}	4^{1}	9^{3}	9	5^{1}	9	8	9	220
9	(United Kingdom) Kris Meeke	8^{3}	7			7^{1}	3^{1}	9^{1}				146
10	(Germany) Timo Scheider								3	6	10	93
11	(Norway) Ole Christian Veiby	5	5									64
12	(Finland) Niclas Grönholm	3	11^{1}									57
13	(Sweden) Johan Kristoffersson		3^{1}									43
14	(United States) Chase Elliott					11	9					34
15	(United States) Austin Cindric					10	11					31
16	(United States) Andrew Carlson			6^{1}								30
17	(United Kingdom) Jenson Button			9	WD							21
18	(Mexico) Benito Guerra									10	5	0

Key
Colour	Result
Gold	Winner
Silver	2nd place
Bronze	3rd place
Green	Other finishing position
Blue	Non Points finish
Purple	Did not finish
Pink	Did not qualify (DNQ)
Black	Disqualified (DSQ)
Brown	Withdrew (WD)
White	Did not start (DNS)
White	Race cancelled (C)

Notes:
^{1 2 3 4} – Battle Wins

=== Group E Team's Championship ===
Pos.	Team	No.	(United Kingdom) LYD	(Sweden) STR	(Minnesota) ERX	(California) HLN	(Arizona) WHP1	(Arizona) WHP2	(Quebec) CTR	(California) HLN2	(California) HLN3	(California) HLN4	Points
1	(United States) Dreyer & Reinbold Racing JC	4	1^{4}	2^{3}	2^{4}	2^{1}	5^{1}	1^{3}	3^{2}	8	4	1	891
1	(United States) Dreyer & Reinbold Racing JC	13	2^{3}	1^{4}	4	3^{2}	3^{2}	8^{1}	7^{3}	1	3	3	891
2	(Sweden) Olsbergs MSE	16	6^{1}	8^{4}	8^{2}	6^{3}	4^{1}	2^{4}	1^{2}	4	7	4	668
2	(Sweden) Olsbergs MSE	68	3	11^{1}									668
2	(Sweden) Olsbergs MSE	23			10^{3}	5^{2}	8^{1}	4^{1}	2^{1}	5	2	8	668
3	(United States) Vermont Sports Car	21	10^{1}	6^{3}	7^{1}	7^{1}	2^{1}	10^{1}	6	7	5	7	638
3	(United States) Vermont Sports Car	199	7^{2}	9^{1}	1^{2}	8^{1}	1^{4}	5^{2}	DSQ^{1}	6	1	6	638
4	(United States) Dreyer & Reinbold Racing	35	4^{1}	4^{2}	3	1^{4}	6	6^{3}	4^{4}	2	9	2	502
4	(United States) Dreyer & Reinbold Racing	52	5										502
4	(United States) Dreyer & Reinbold Racing	3		3^{1}									502
4	(United States) Dreyer & Reinbold Racing	15			6^{1}								502
5	(United Kingdom) Xite Energy Racing	42	9^{1}	10	5^{1}	4^{1}	9^{3}	9	5^{1}	9	8	9	498
5	(United Kingdom) Xite Energy Racing	62	8^{3}	7			7^{1}	3^{1}	9^{1}				498
5	(United Kingdom) Xite Energy Racing	22			9	WD							498
5	(United Kingdom) Xite Energy Racing	12								3	6	10	498
Pos.	Team		(United Kingdom) LYD	(Sweden) STR	(Minnesota) ERX	(California) HLN	(Arizona) WHP1	(Arizona) WHP2	(Quebec) CTR	(California) HLN2	(California) HLN3	(California) HLN4	Points
