= Urajärvi =

Lake in Finland

- Location within Finland
- Location: Iitti
- Coordinates: 60°55′N 26°26′E
- Basin countries: Finland
- Surface area: 14.147 km^{2} (5.462 sq mi)
- Average depth: 4.44 m (14.6 ft)
- Max. depth: 16.12 m (52.9 ft)
- Water volume: 0.0629 km^{3} (51,000 acre⋅ft)
- Shore length^{1}: 29.46 km (18.31 mi)
- Surface elevation: 65.3 m (214 ft)
- Frozen: December–April
- Islands: Pukkisaari
- Settlements: Kausala
- ^{1} Shore length is not a well-defined measure.

Urajärvi is a medium-sized lake in the Kymijoki main catchment area in Kymenlaakso region, Finland. It is located in the Iitti municipality near to Kausala, the administrative center of Iitti.

== See also ==
- List of lakes in Finland
