= Juho Mynttinen =

Finnish politician

- Born: 9 October 1859; Iitti, Finland
- Died: 29 May 1916 (aged 56)
- Occupations: farmer and politician
- Years active: 1904–1913
- Political party: Finnish Party

Member, Diet of Finland
- In office 1904–1906

Member, Parliament of Finland
- In office 1909–1910

Member, Parliament of Finland
- In office 1911–1913

Juho Mynttinen (9 October 1859, Iitti – 29 May 1916) was a Finnish farmer and politician. He was a Member of the Diet of Finland from 1904 to 1906 and a Member of the Parliament of Finland from 1909 to 1910 and again from 1911 to 1913, representing the Finnish Party.
