= Verla =

Finnish UNESCO world heritage site

Verla Groundwood and Board Mill
UNESCO World Heritage Site
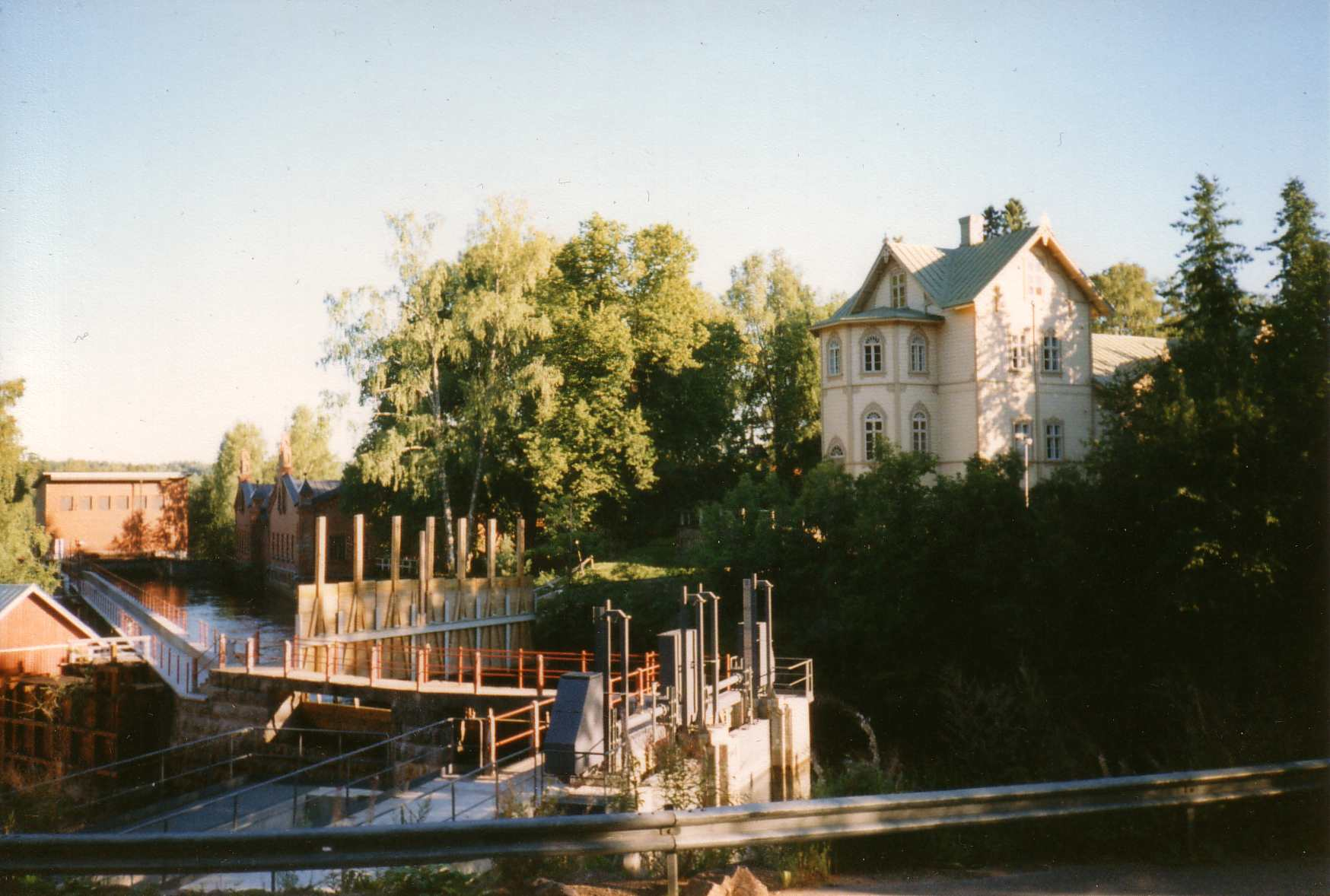
- Left: the hydroelectric power station with canal Front centre: the locks (the wood mill is partly hidden behind the trees); Right: the manor house

- Location within Finland
- Location: Jaala, Kymenlaakso, Finland
- Criteria: Cultural: (iv)
- Reference: 751
- Inscription: 1996 (20th Session)
- Area: 22.778 ha (56.29 acres)
- Buffer zone: 88.03 ha (217.5 acres)
- Website: http://www.verla.fi/
- Coordinates: 61°3′43″N 26°38′27″E

Verla at Jaala, Kouvola, Finland, is a well-preserved 19th-century mill village. Situated along the northern Kymi River, the mill, nearby power plants, and residential houses were inscribed on the UNESCO World Heritage List in 1996 due to its testimony to the lumber industry in the 19th century and the lives of the industrial workers of that time.

== Description ==
Verla is a typical example of a late-19th-century wood-processing mill village. The mill owner's residence, made out of wood, and the surrounding park are located on the western side of the river along with the factory buildings, and the workers' houses are arranged in a regular pattern on the eastern side. Most of the factory buildings are made out of red brick, and despite their somewhat outdated Neo Gothic style, they were technologically advanced for the time. These include the mill, the drying-plant, a flour mill and a few storehouses. Along the river, there are three power plants, constructed in the 1920s, 1954 and 1995. Prehistoric rock art (roughly 6,000 years old) was found on the eastern side of the river, depicting elk, humans and geometric patterns in red ink.

== History ==
The first groundwood mill at Verla was founded in 1872 by Hugo Neuman but was destroyed in a fire in 1876. A larger groundwood and board mill, founded in 1882 by Gottlieb Kreidl and Louis Haenel, continued to operate until 18 July 1964, when the last of the old workers retired. In 1908, the mill was acquired by the Kymmene Corporation. Most of the buildings in the mill village date to the turn of the 20th century (1885–1902).

== Museum ==
After closing operations, the historical paper mill was converted into a museum of board mill technology that opened in 1972. The historical machines were preserved in their places (except for several pieces brought from other buildings). A guided tour to the mill follows the technological process from timber cutting and pulp production to board drying, sorting, and packing.

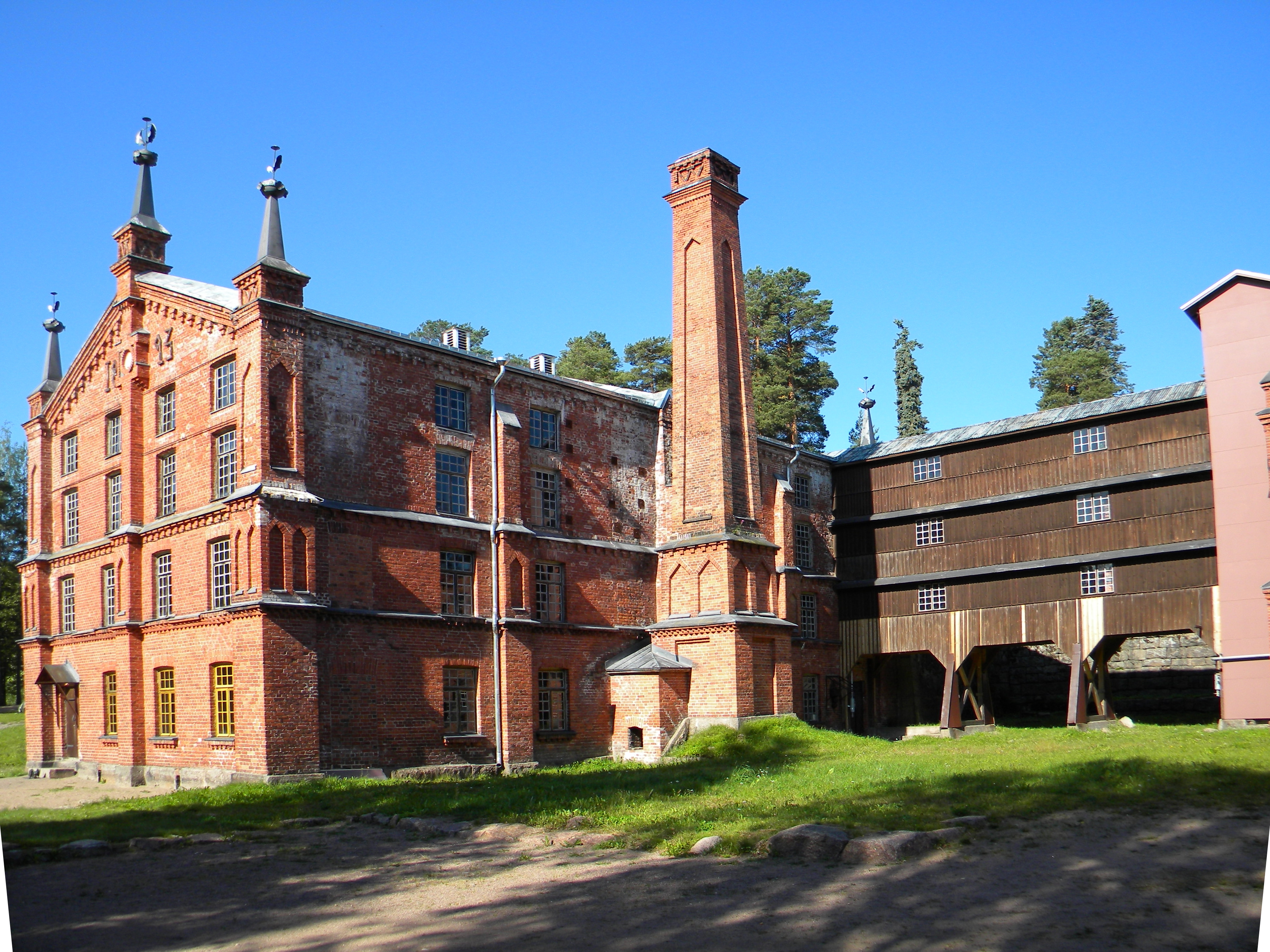
Museum

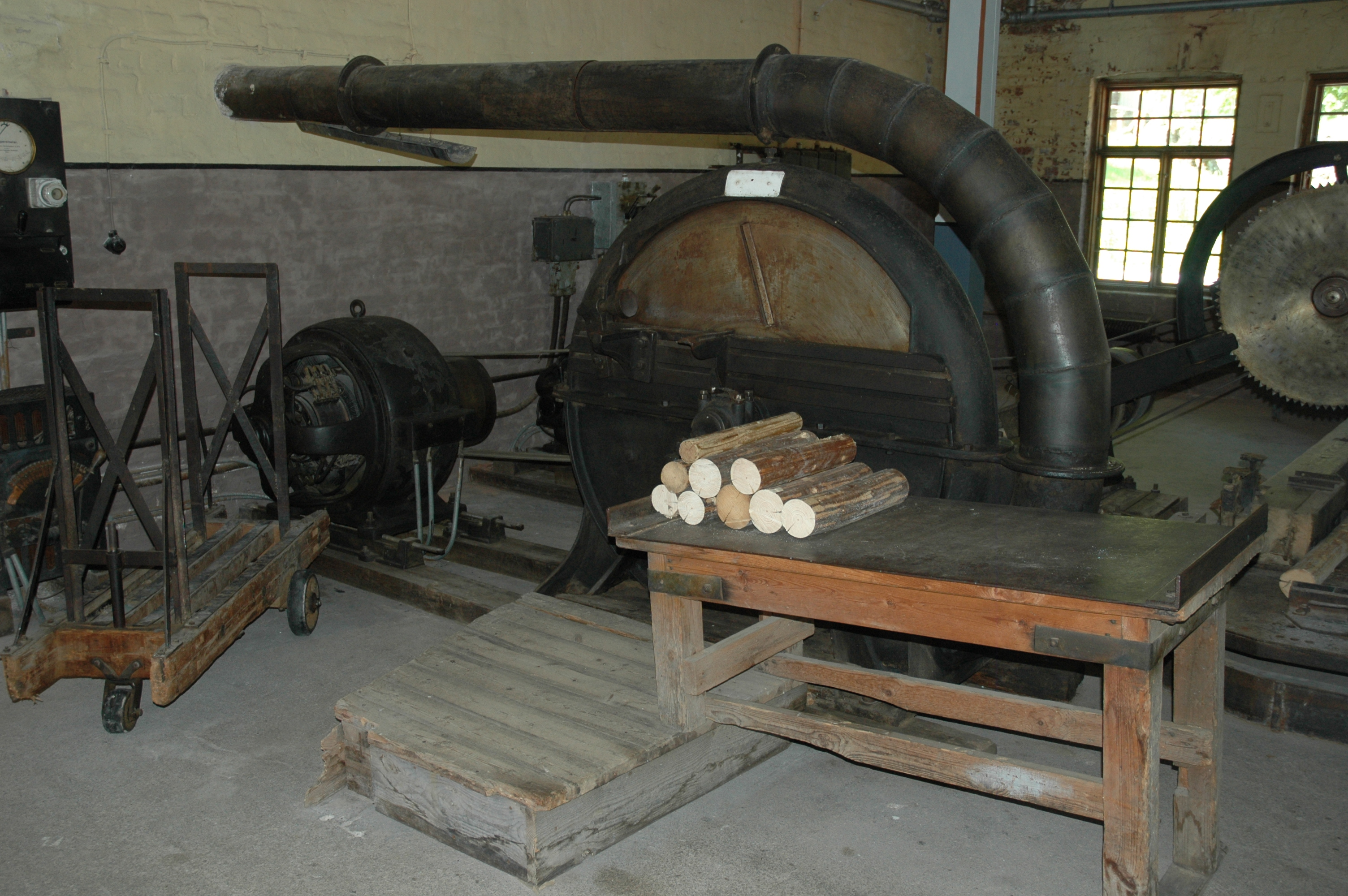
Debarking machine

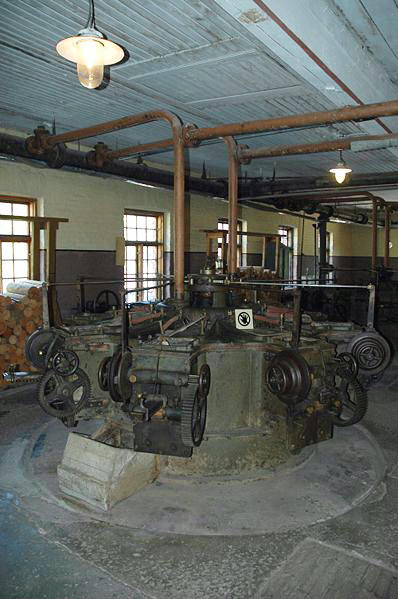
Grinder (a groundwood production machine)

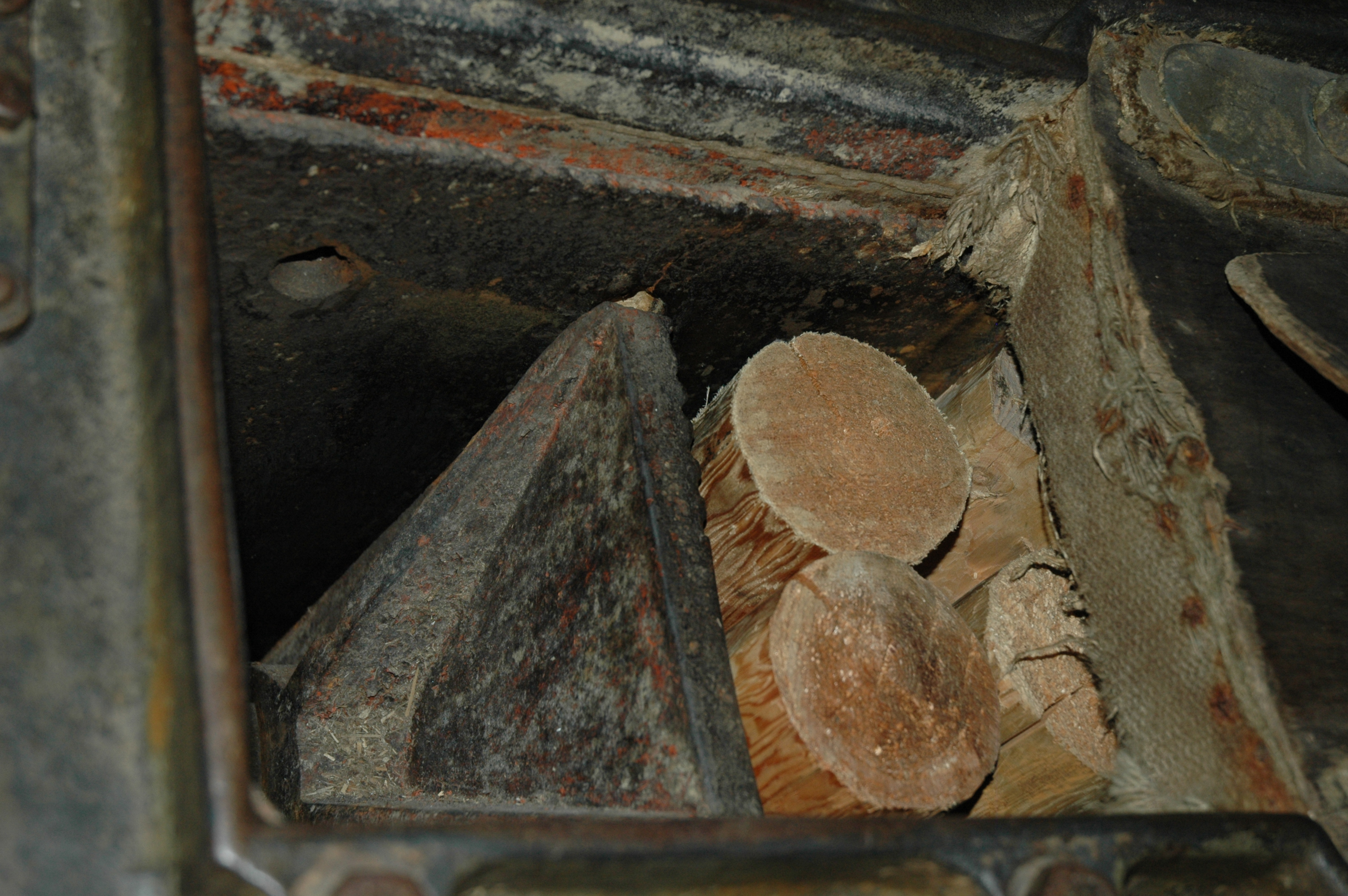
Logs in the grinder
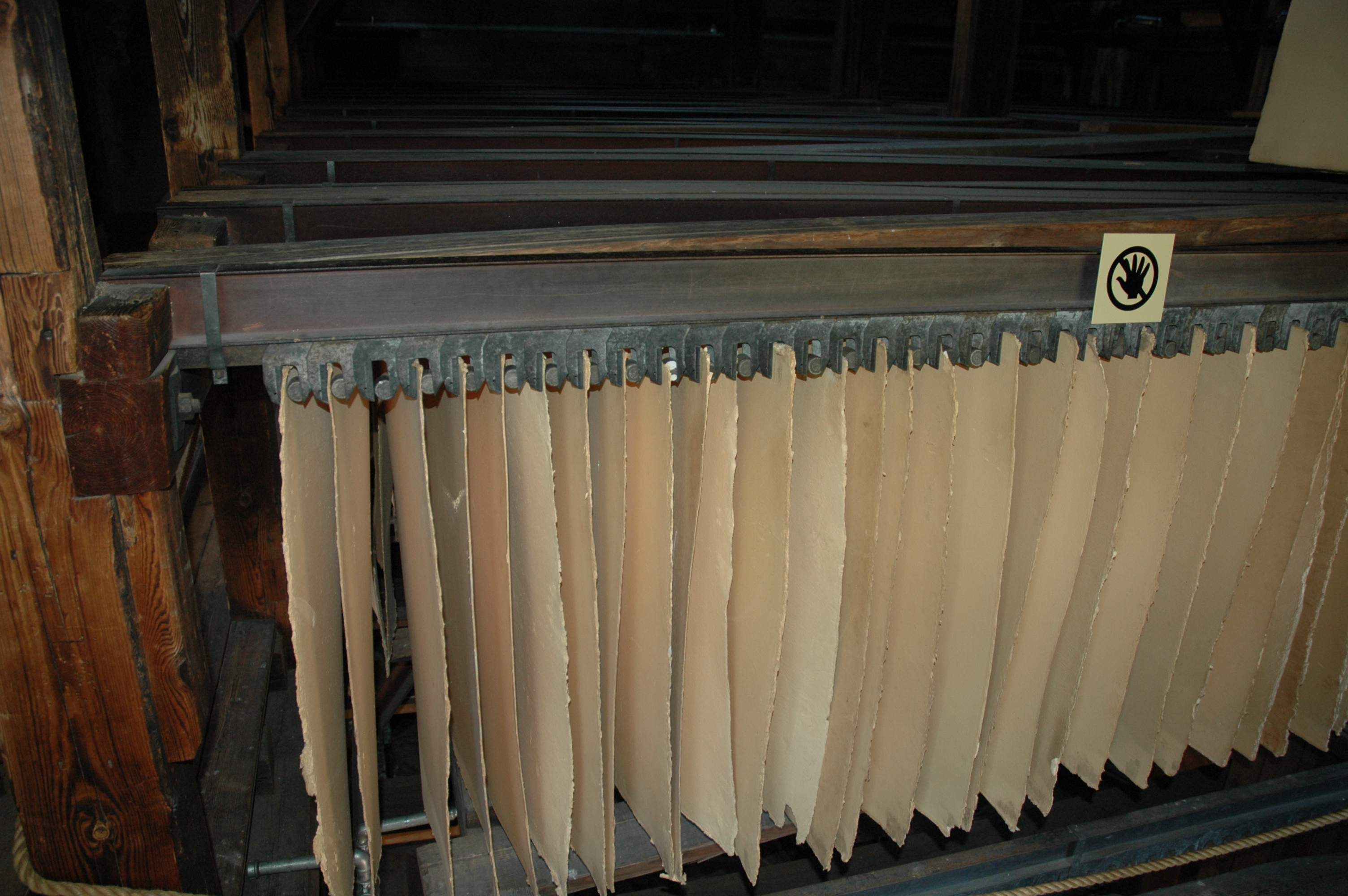
Board drying in the Winter drying loft

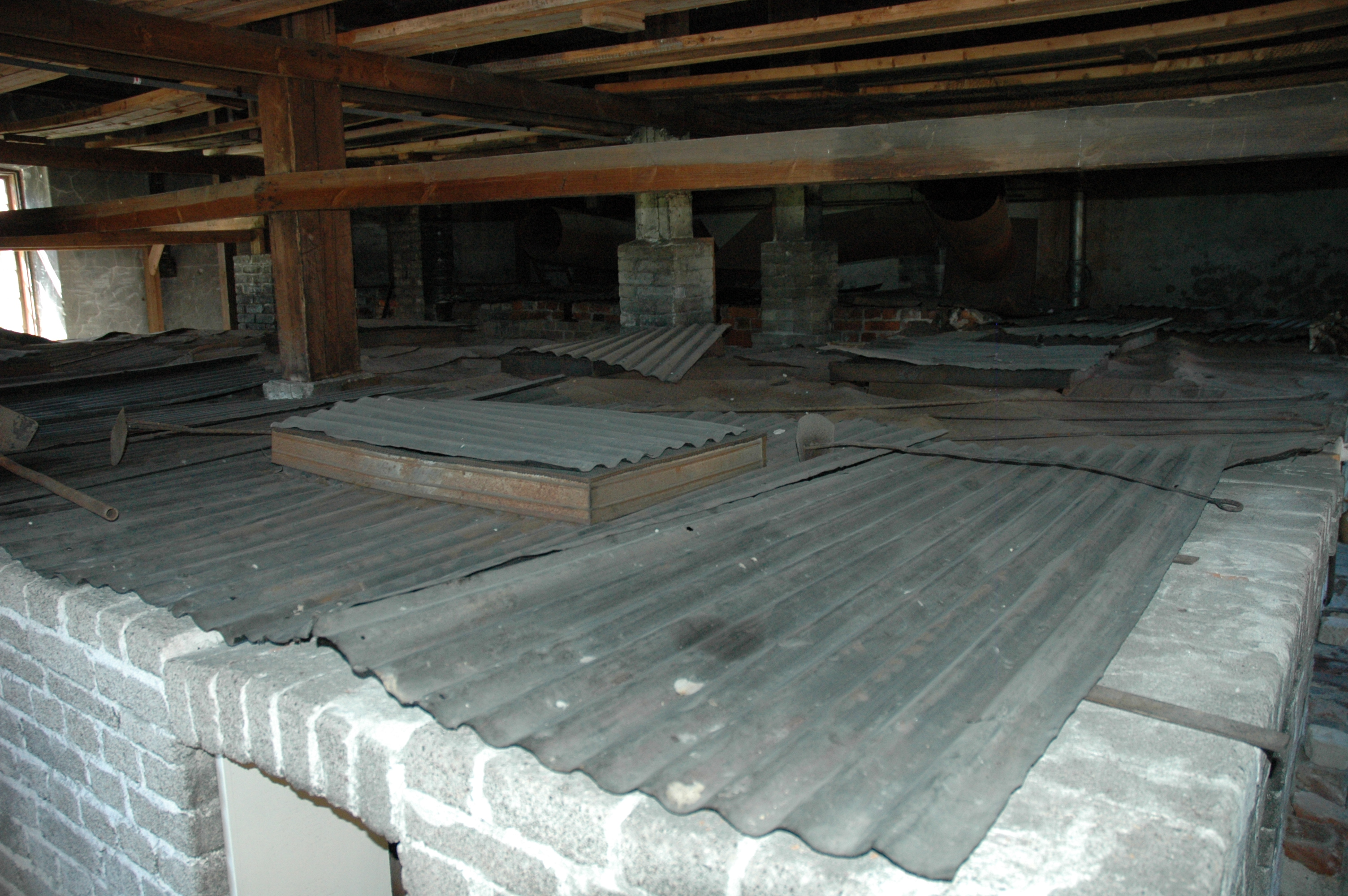
Board drying oven in the Winter drying loft

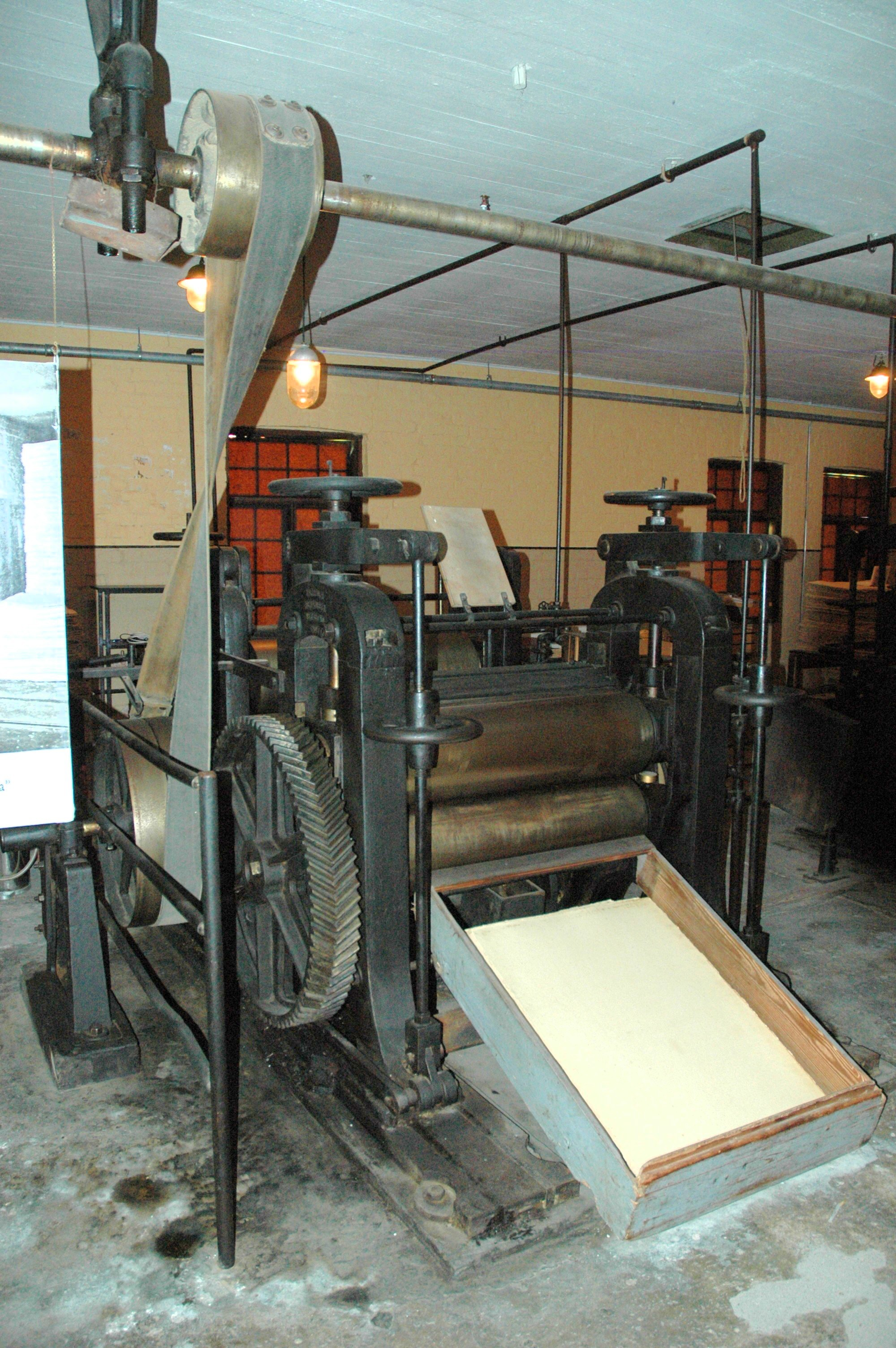
An off-line calender

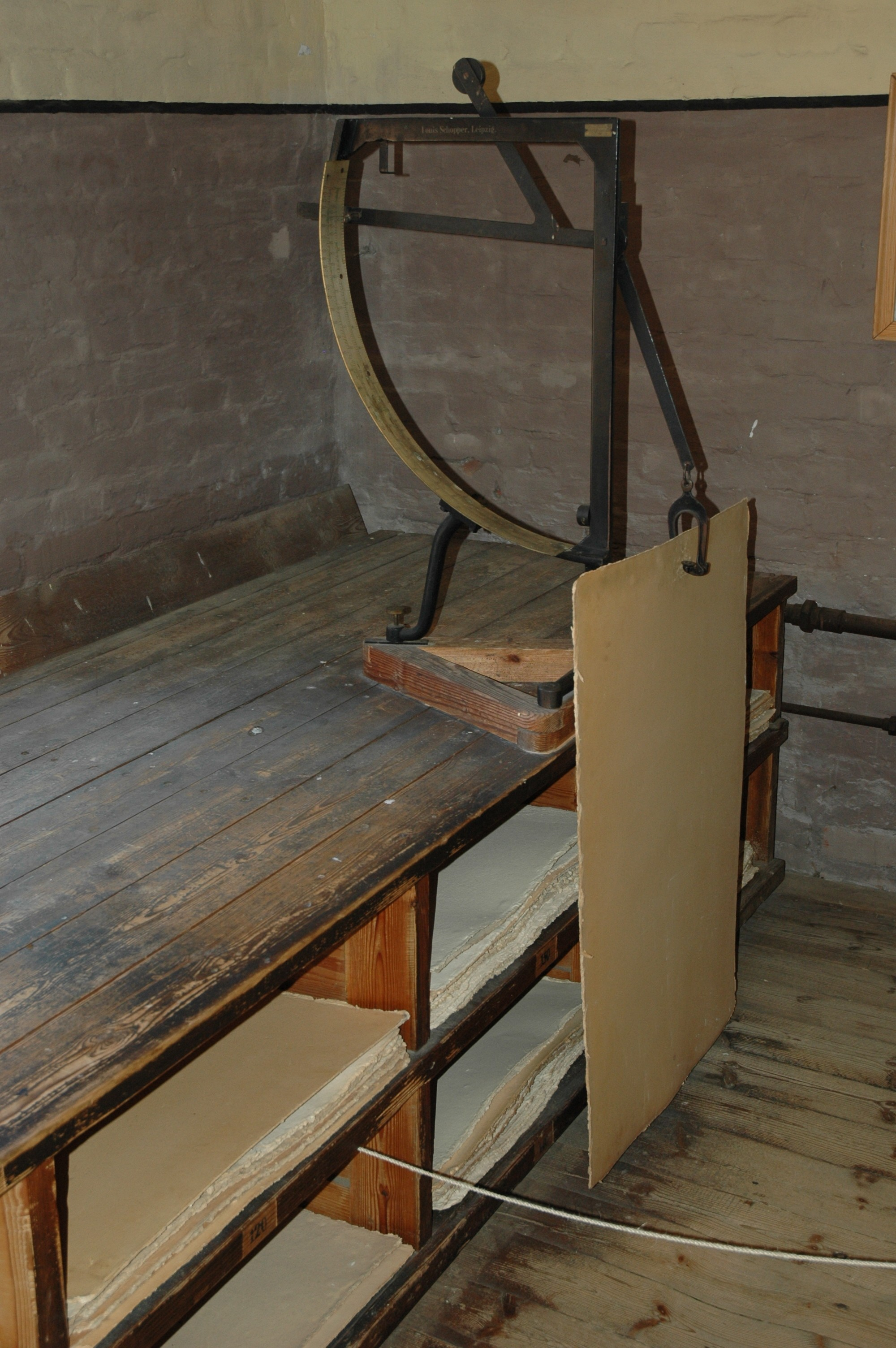
Board calibration balance
