= Pyhäjärvi (disambiguation) =

Pyhäjärvi is a common name of lakes in Finland. It may refer to

- Pyhäjärvi (Tampere region), in the Pirkanmaa Region
- Pyhäjärvi (Pyhäjärvi), in Pyhäjärvi municipality
- Pyhäjärvi (Satakunta), in Satakunta
- Pyhäjärvi (Karelia), in Karelia on the Finland–Russia border
- Pyhäjärvi (Kymenlaakso), in the northern Kymenlaakso
- Pyhäjärvi (Saarijärvi), in the Central Finland

Pyhäjärvi has also been the name of several municipalities of Finland:

- Pyhäjärvi, in Northern Bothnia
- Pyhäjärvi Ul, former municipality in Uusimaa, now part of Karkkila
- Otradnoye, Priozersky District, Leningrad Oblast, formerly the Finnish municipality of Pyhäjärvi Vpl., now in Leningrad Oblast, Russia
- Svyatozero, a lake and former municipality in the Republic of Karelia, was occupied by Finland 1941–44
