= Kymijoki =

Coordinates: 60°29′25.81″N 026°27′08.82″E

Kymi
- Topographic map of the Kymi river
- Native name: Kymijoki (Finnish); Kymmene älv (Swedish)

Location
- Country: Finland

Physical characteristics
- Source
  - location: Päijänne
  - elevation: 78.2 m (257 ft)
- Mouth
  - location: Gulf of Finland (Baltic Sea)
- Length: 204 km (127 mi)
- Discharge
  - average: 283 m^{3}/s (10,000 cu ft/s)

Kymijoki (Swedish: Kymmene älv) is a river in Finland. It begins at Lake Päijänne, flows through the provinces of Päijänne Tavastia, Uusimaa and Kymenlaakso, and discharges into the Gulf of Finland. The river passes the towns of Heinola and Kouvola. The town of Kotka is located on the river delta. The length of the river is 204 kilometres (127 mi), but its drainage basin of 37,107 square kilometres (14,327 mi^{2}) extends to almost 600 kilometres (370 mi) inside the Tavastia, Central Finland, Savonia and Ostrobothnia. The furthest source of the river is Lake Pielavesi, its furthest point being some 570 kilometres (350 mi) from the sea measured by flow route. The name of the river, itself, kymi, means "large river", in Old Finnish.

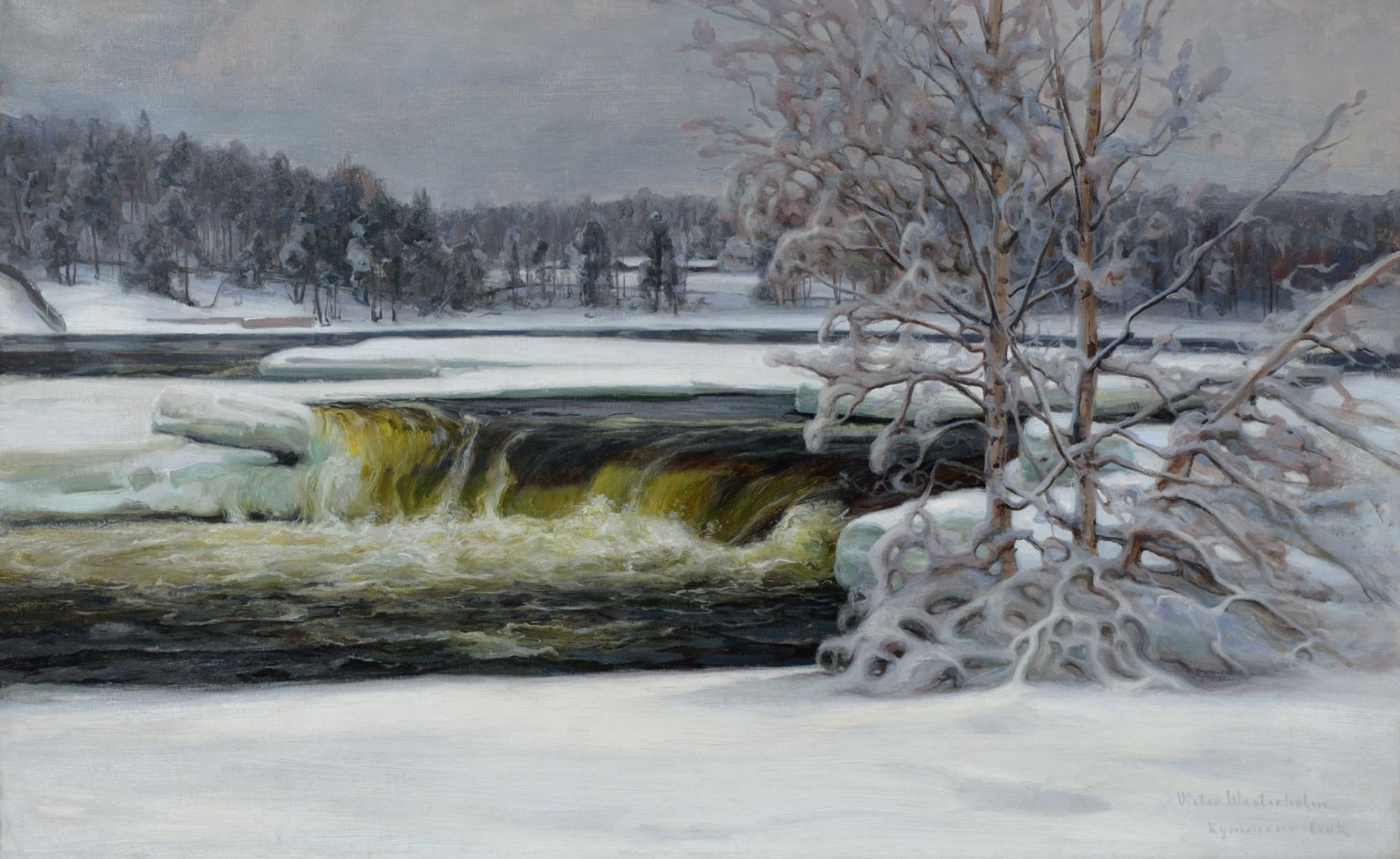
Kymijoki by Victor Westerholm in 1902

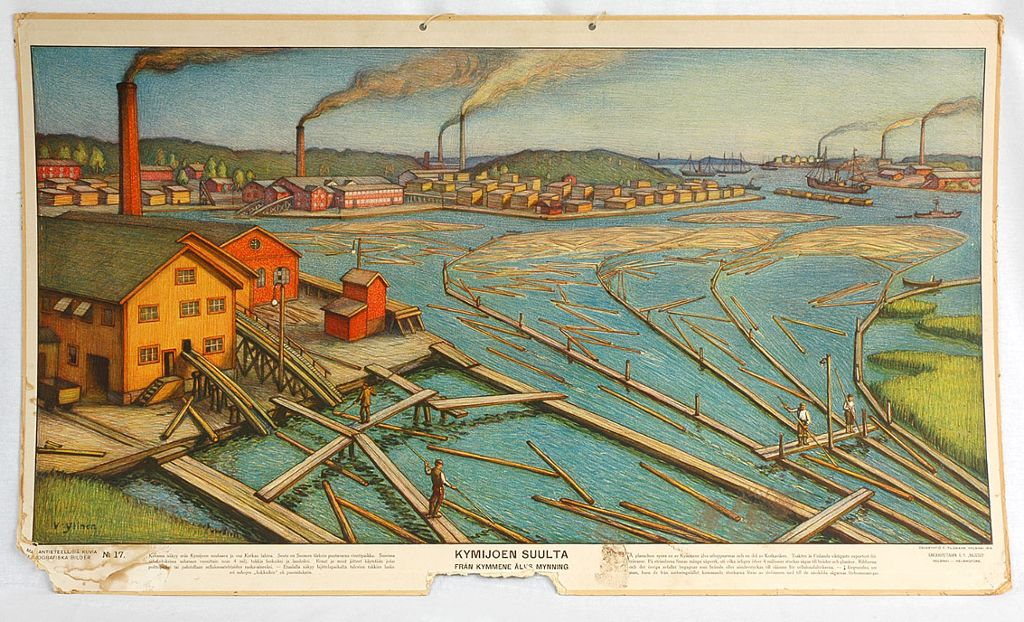
Mouth of Kymijoki, educational poster by Vihtori Ylinen from 1914

Being one of the largest rivers in Southern Finland, Kymijoki is a major source of hydroelectricity. The towns of Kotka, Kuusankoski, Myllykoski and Inkeroinen along the river are major centres of the pulp and paper industry. Formerly the river was extensively used for timber rafting.

Kymijoki has five mouths. It divides into two main branches near the Kultaankoski rapids in Kotka, about 15 kilometres (9 mi) inland of the Gulf of Finland. The eastern branch splits into the Korkeakoski and Koivukoski branches, the latter branch dividing again to form two mouths (Langinkoski and Huumanhaara). The Korkeakoski branch has only one river mouth.

The western branch divides into Ahvenkoski and Klåsarö branches, each with one mouth.

The westernmost Ahvenkoski branch of the river served as part of the border between Sweden and Russian Empire from 1743 to 1809, and between the Grand Duchy of Finland and the rest of Russia from 1809 to 1812. The parts of Finland east of the river were later called Old Finland. Old Finland was incorporated into the Grand Duchy of Finland in 1812.

Kymijoki is very swift: it takes three days for its waters to run from lake Pyhäjärvi to sea. Its mean depth is 9 metres (30 ft), and the deepest place is 29 metres (95 ft).

== Hydroelectric plants and rapids ==
In Kymijoki, there are 12 hydroelectric plants and several dams to regulate the water level. The first power plants were built is 1882. The canal and dam at Kalkkinen is used to regulate the water level of Lake Päijänne. The Hirvivuolle Dam regulates water flow between eastern and western branches. The Paaskoski Dam near Tammijärvi regulates the flow into the Klåsarö branch and the Strömfors Dam regulates the water level of the Strömfors industrial area.

Upper and middle reaches:

- Kalkkistenkoski rapids and regulating dam (Asikkala)
- Jyrängönkoski rapids (Heinola)
- Vuolenkoski, hydroelectric plant (Iitti)
- Mankala, hydroelectric plant (Iitti)
- Voikkaa, hydroelectric plant (Kouvola)
- Pessankoski rapids (Kouvola)
- Lappakoski rapids (Kouvola)
- Kuusankoski, hydroelectric plant (Kouvola)
- Keltti, hydroelectric plant (Kouvola)
- Myllykoski, hydroelectric plant (Kouvola)
- Anjalankoski (Ankkapurha), hydroelectric plant (Kouvola)
- Piirteenkoski rapids (Kouvola)
- Susikoski rapids (At the boundary of Kouvola and ja Kotka)
- Ahvionkoski rapids area, elevation 1,9 m (At the boundary of Kouvola and Kotka)
- Kultaankosket rapids, elevation 1,5 m (At the boundary of Kouvola and Kotka)

Western branch:

- Hirvivuolle, regulating dam, built in 1933 (Pyhtää)
- Hirvikoski rapids (Pyhtää)
- Paaskoski, regulating dam, built in 1933(At the boundary of Pyhtää and Loviisa)
- Klåsarö (Loosarinkoski), hydroelectric plant (Pyhtää)
- Ediskoski, hydroelectric plant (Pyhtää)
- Strömfors, regulating dam, built in 1965 (Loviisa)
- Ahvenkoski, hydroelectric plant (At the boundary of Pyhtää and Loviisa)

Eastern branch:

- Pernoonkosket rapids area, elevation 5 m (Kotka)
- Laajakoski rapids (cleared away, Kotka)
- Koivukoski, hydroelectric plant and regulating dam (Koivukoski branch, Kotka)
- Siikakoski rapids (Koivukoski branch, Kotka)
- Kokonkoski rapids (Koivukoski branch, Kotka)
- Langinkoski rapids (Langinkoski branch, Kotka)
- Hinttulankoski rapids (Huumanhaara branch, Kotka)
- Korkeakoski, hydroelectric plant (Korkeakoski branch, Kotka)

== Gallery of Kymijoki locations ==
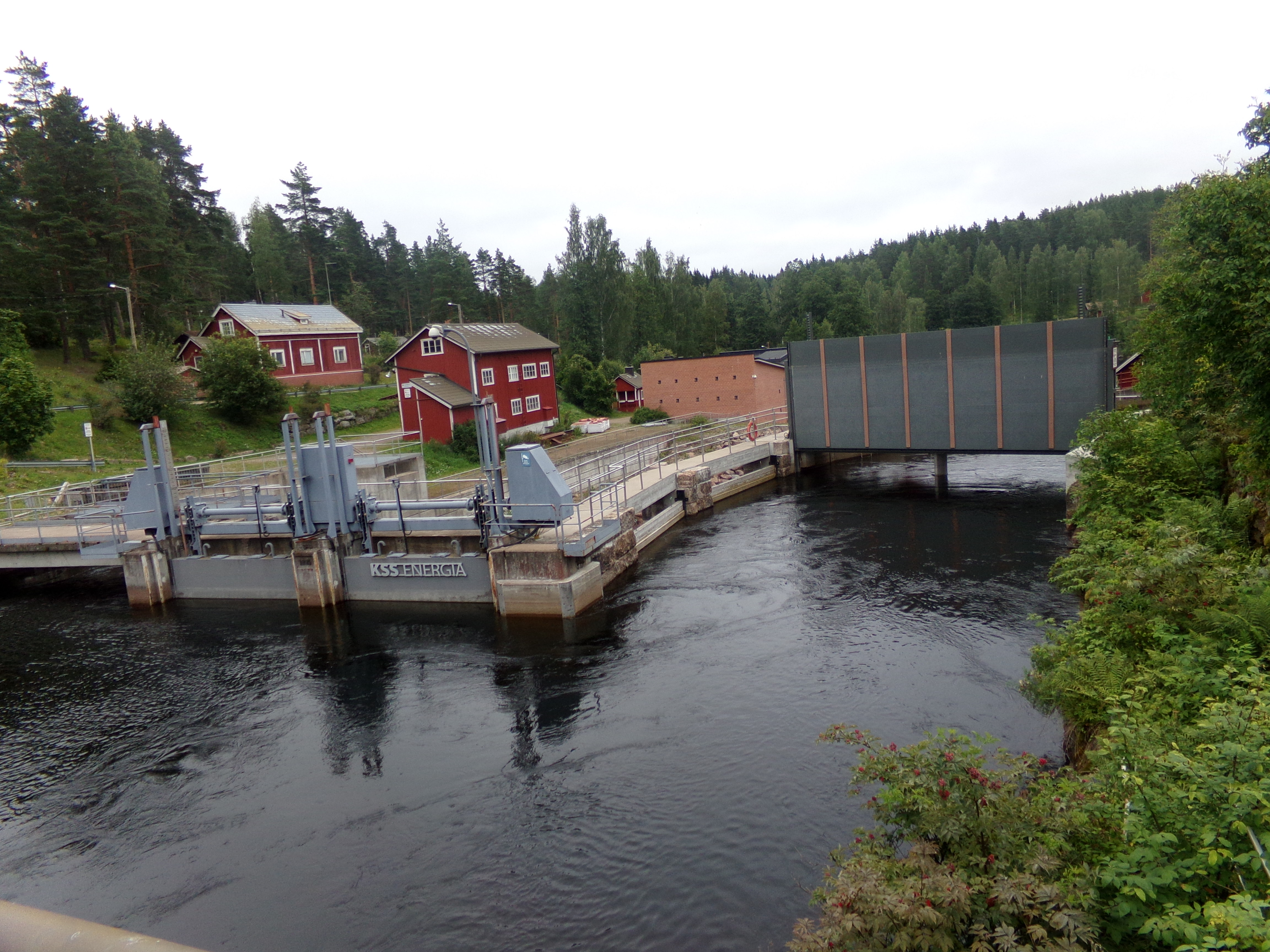
Verla, Jaala

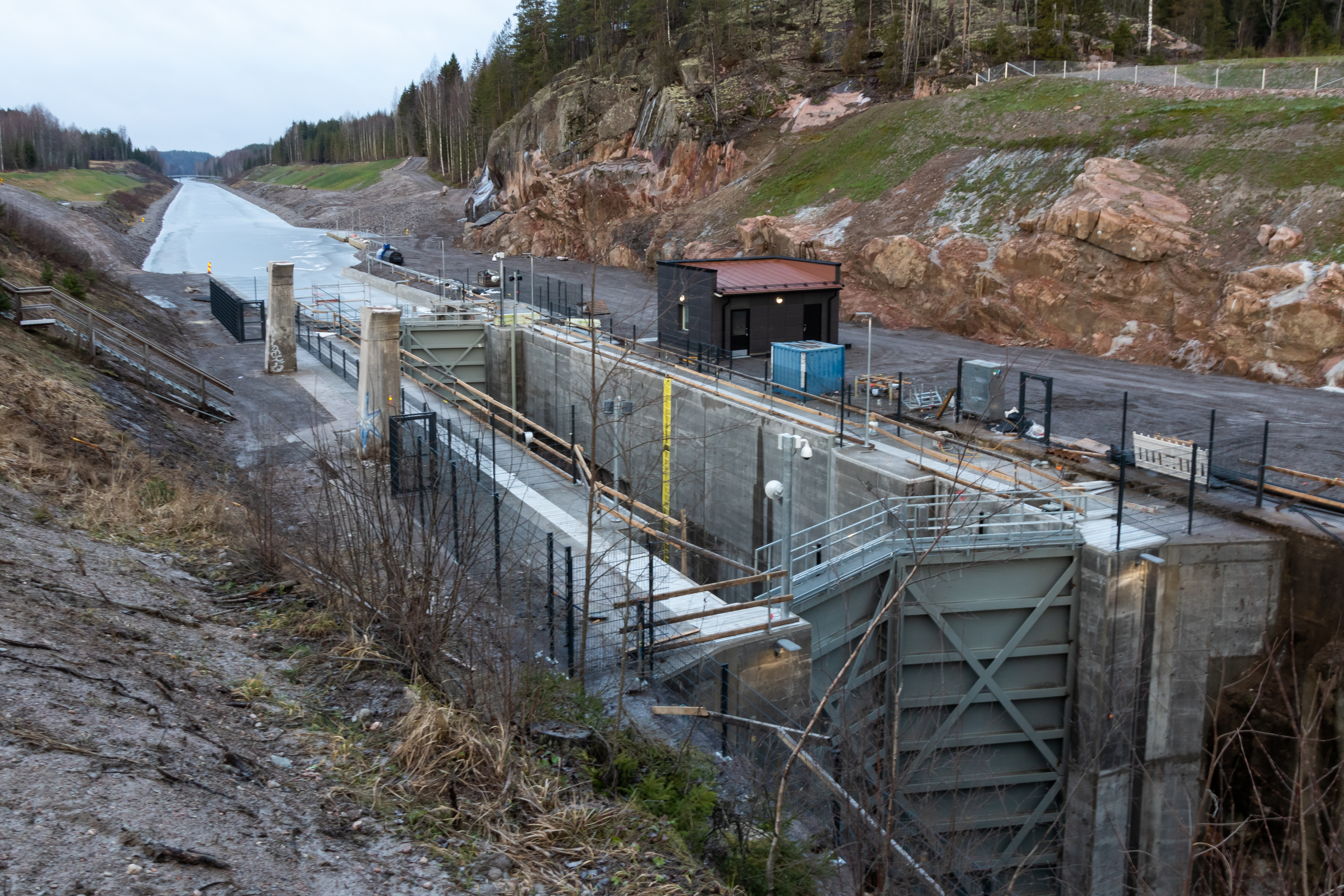
Kimola Canal

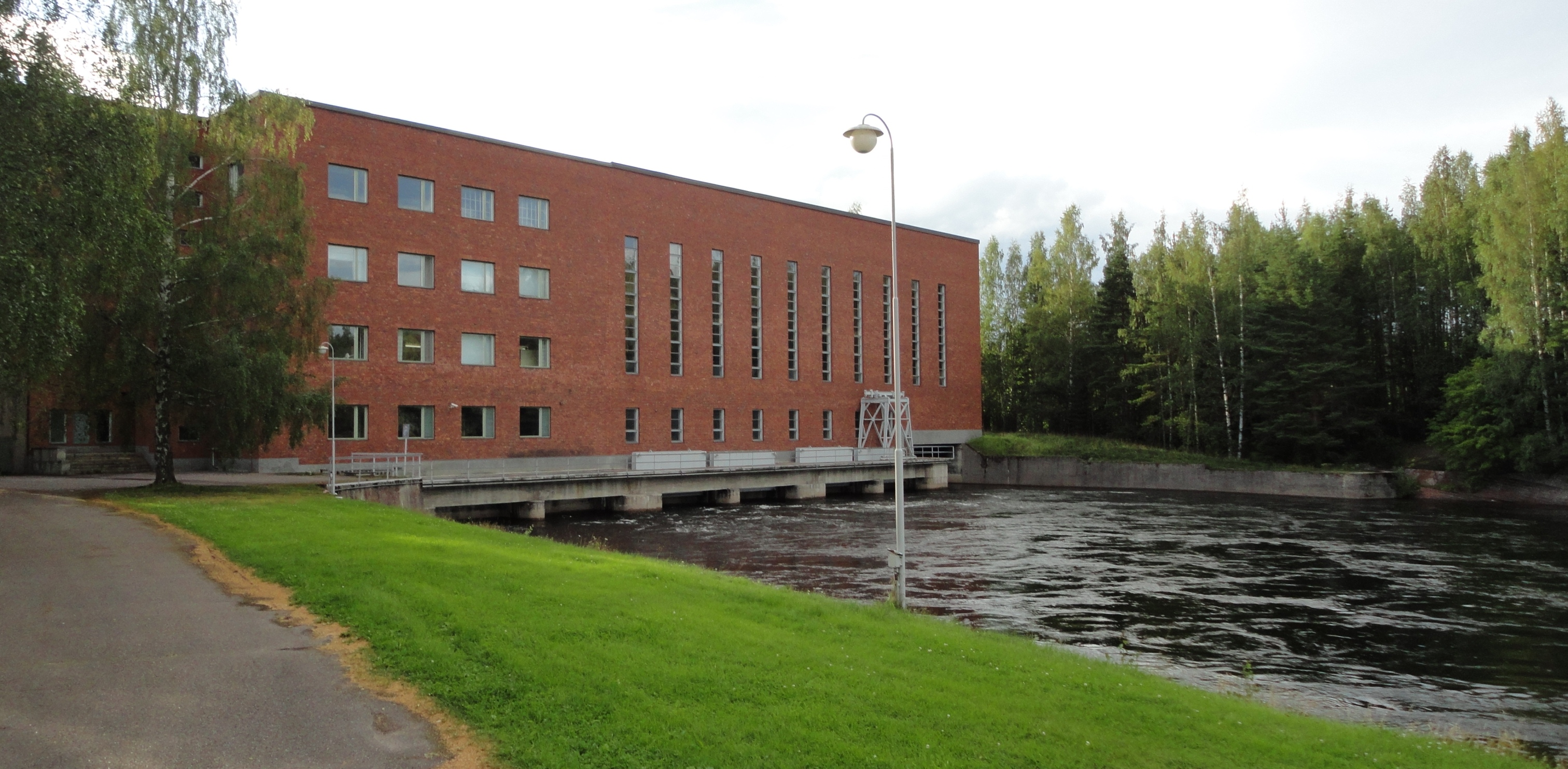
Mankala Power Station along Kymijoki in the Iitti municipality

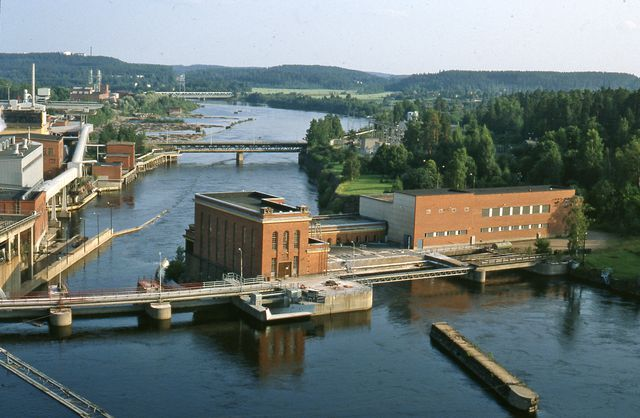
Voikkaa Paper Mill in Kuusankoski

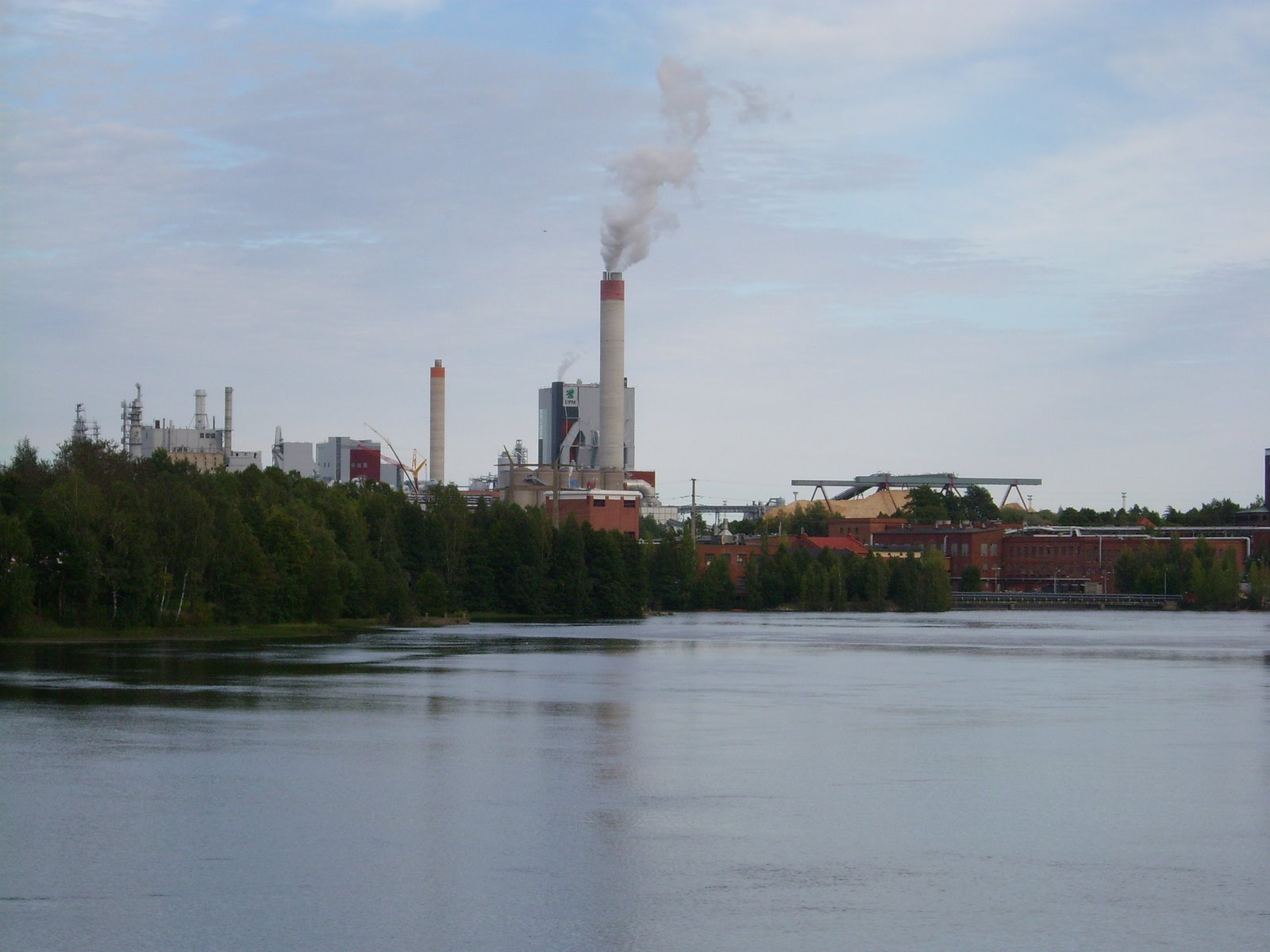
UPM Kymi in Kouvola

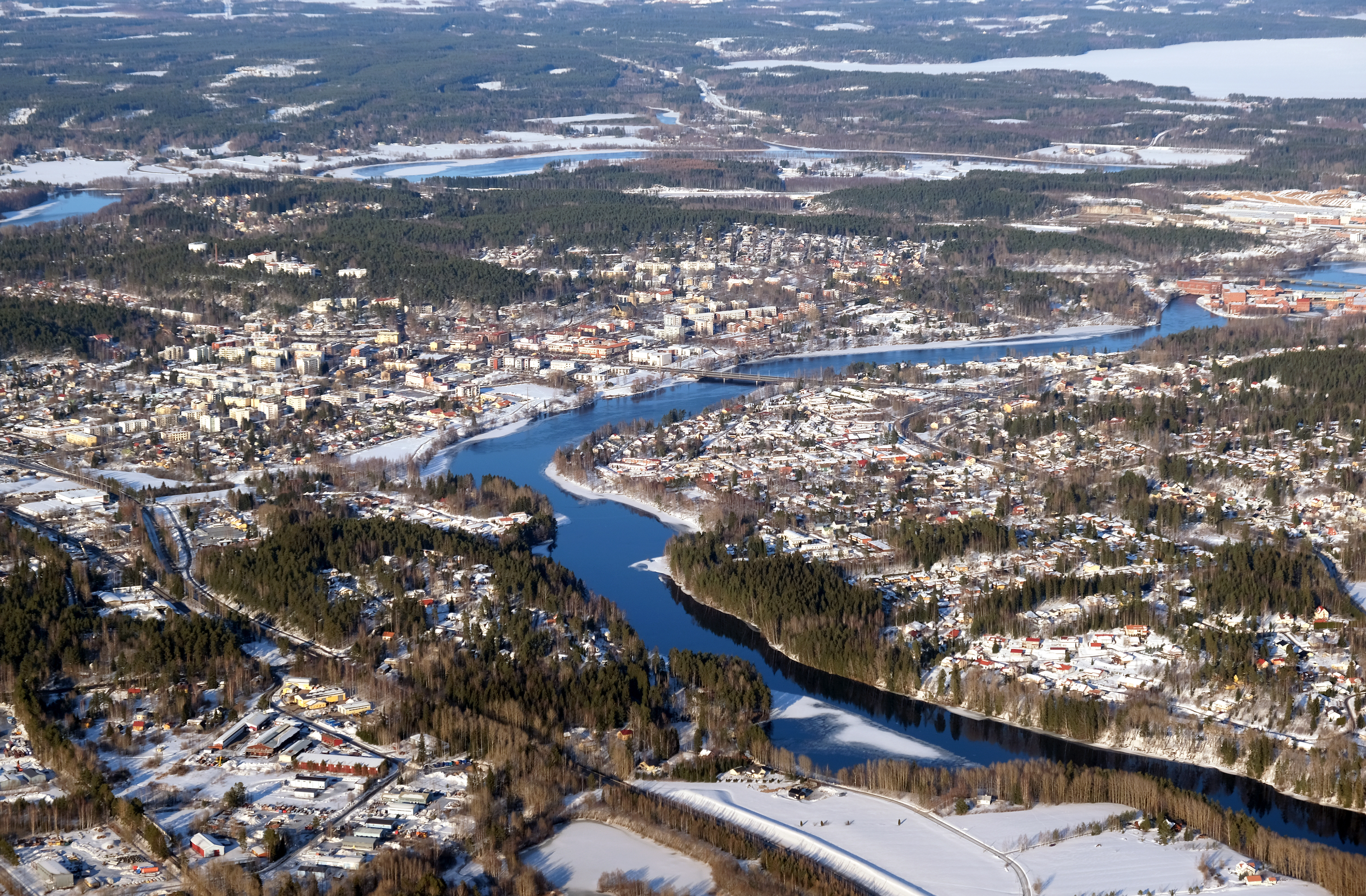
Kymi River in Kouvola

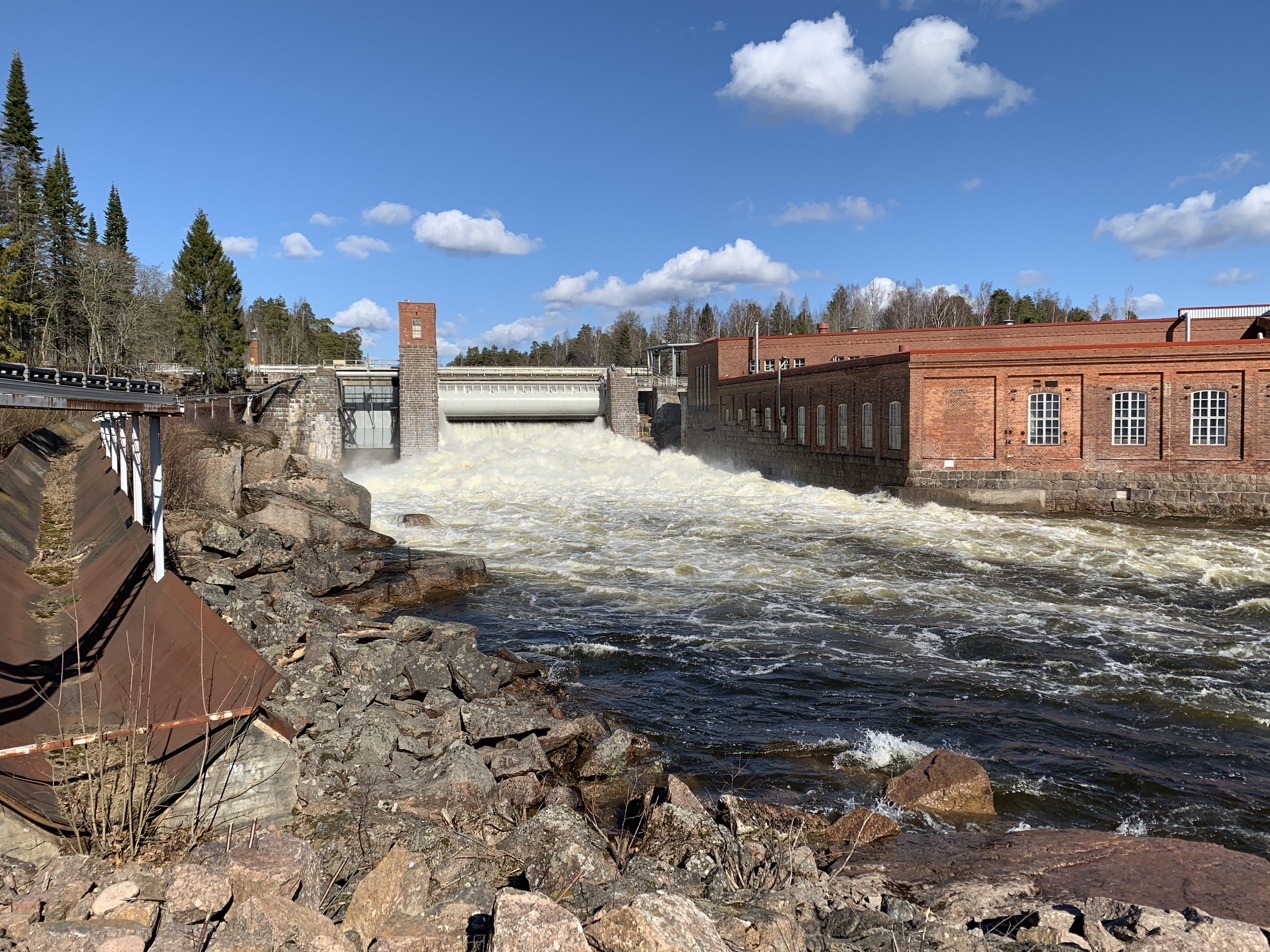
Ankkapurha in Anjalankoski

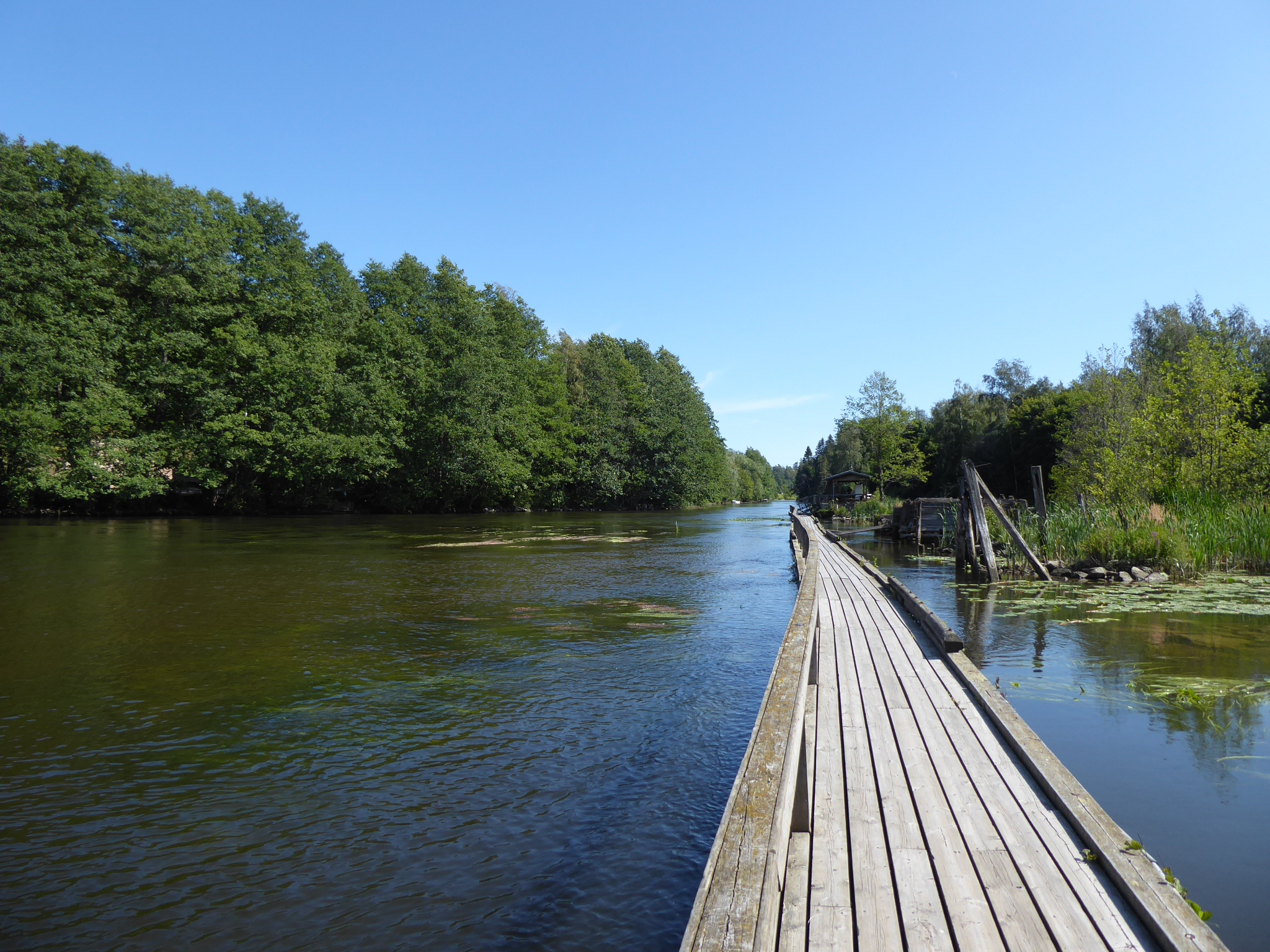
Korkeakoski casting pier on Kymijoki, Kotka

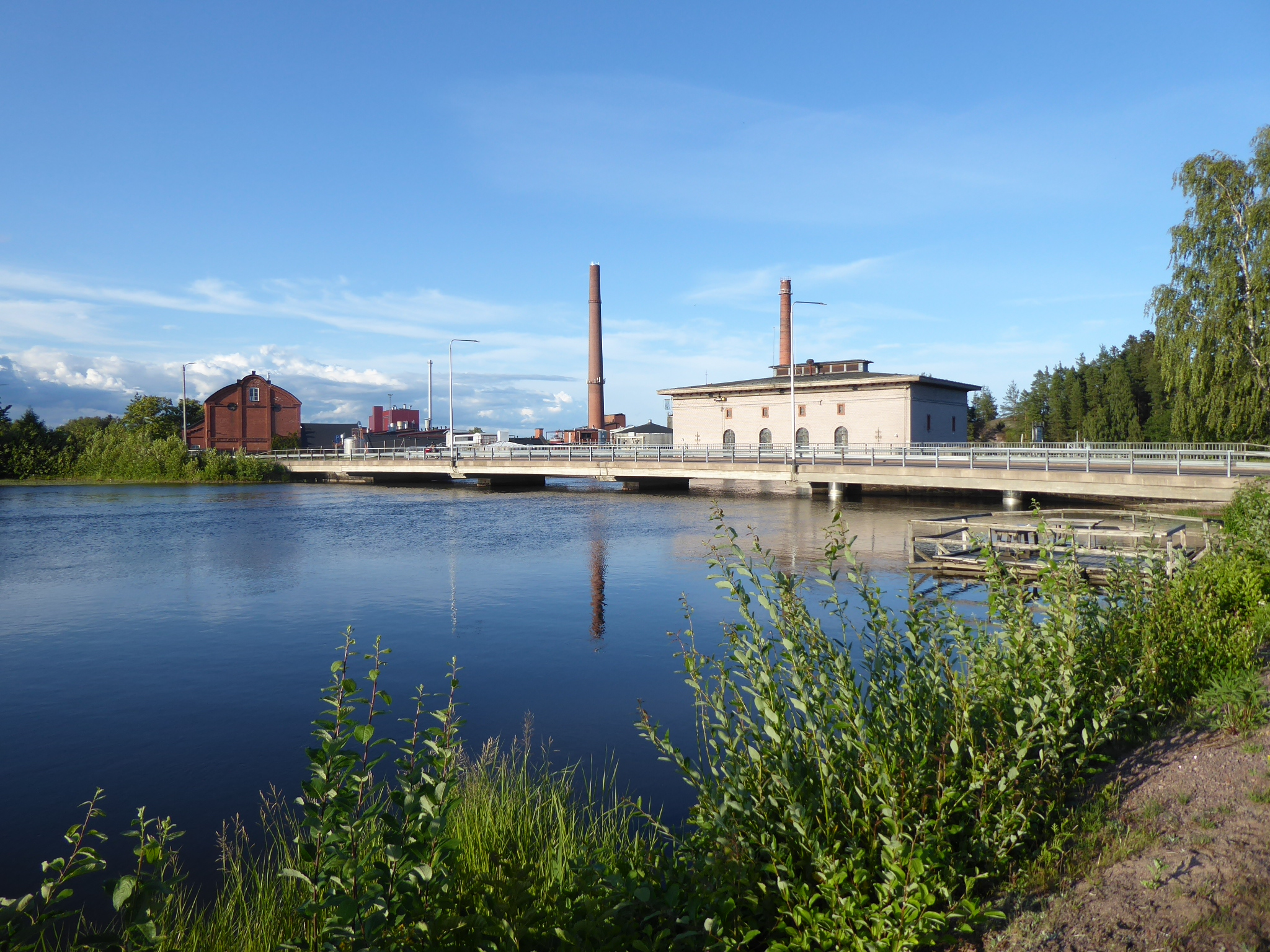
Kymijoki at the Korkeakoski hydroelectric power plant in Kotka

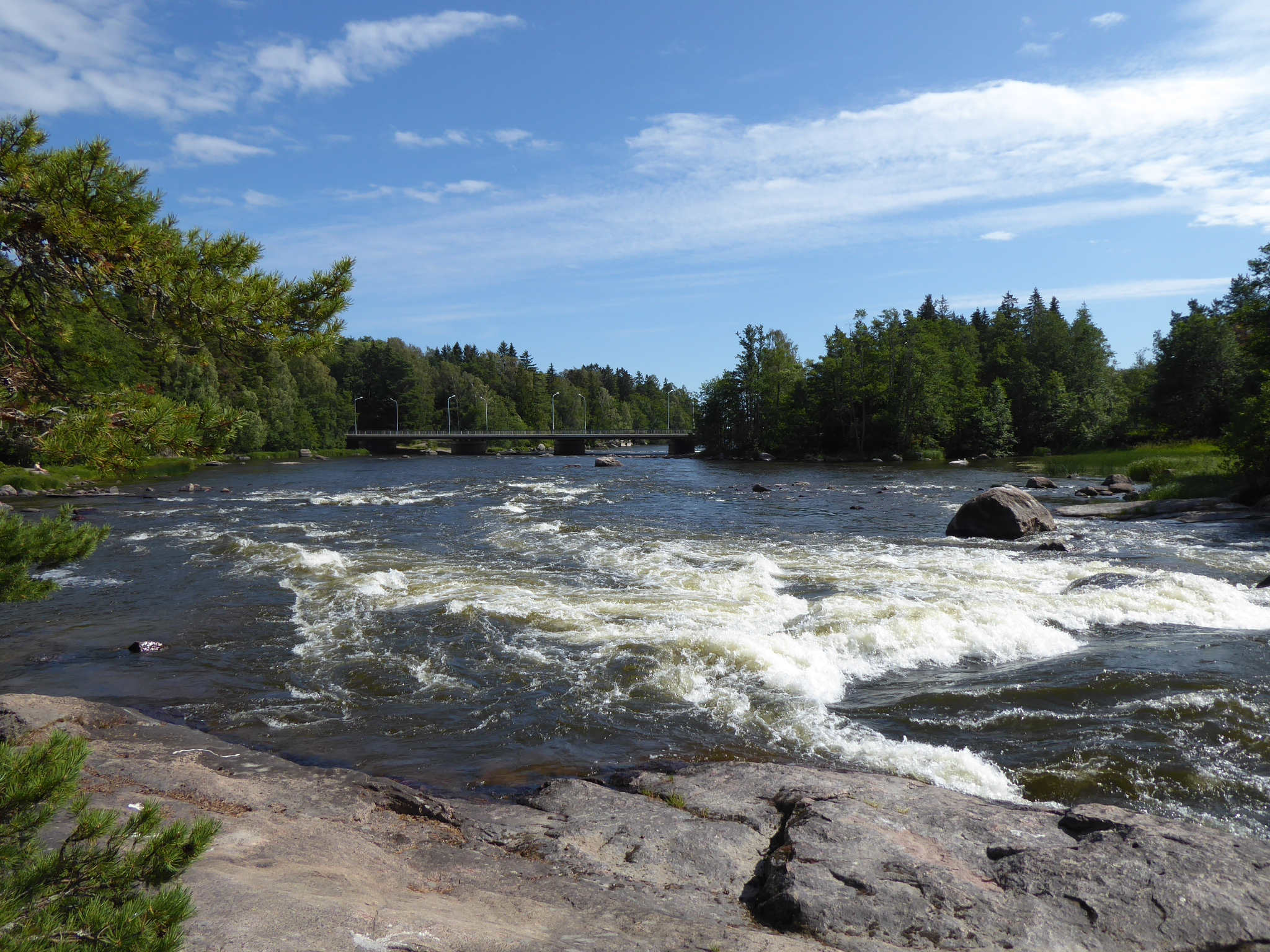
Langinkoski is a rapid through which a branch of Kymijoki flows into the Gulf of Finland

== See also ==
- Kymiring
- Kymi, former municipality of Finland
- Langinkoski, rapids on the river
- Treaty of Åbo
