= Pyhäjärvi (Kymenlaakso) =

Lake in Kymenlaakso, Finland

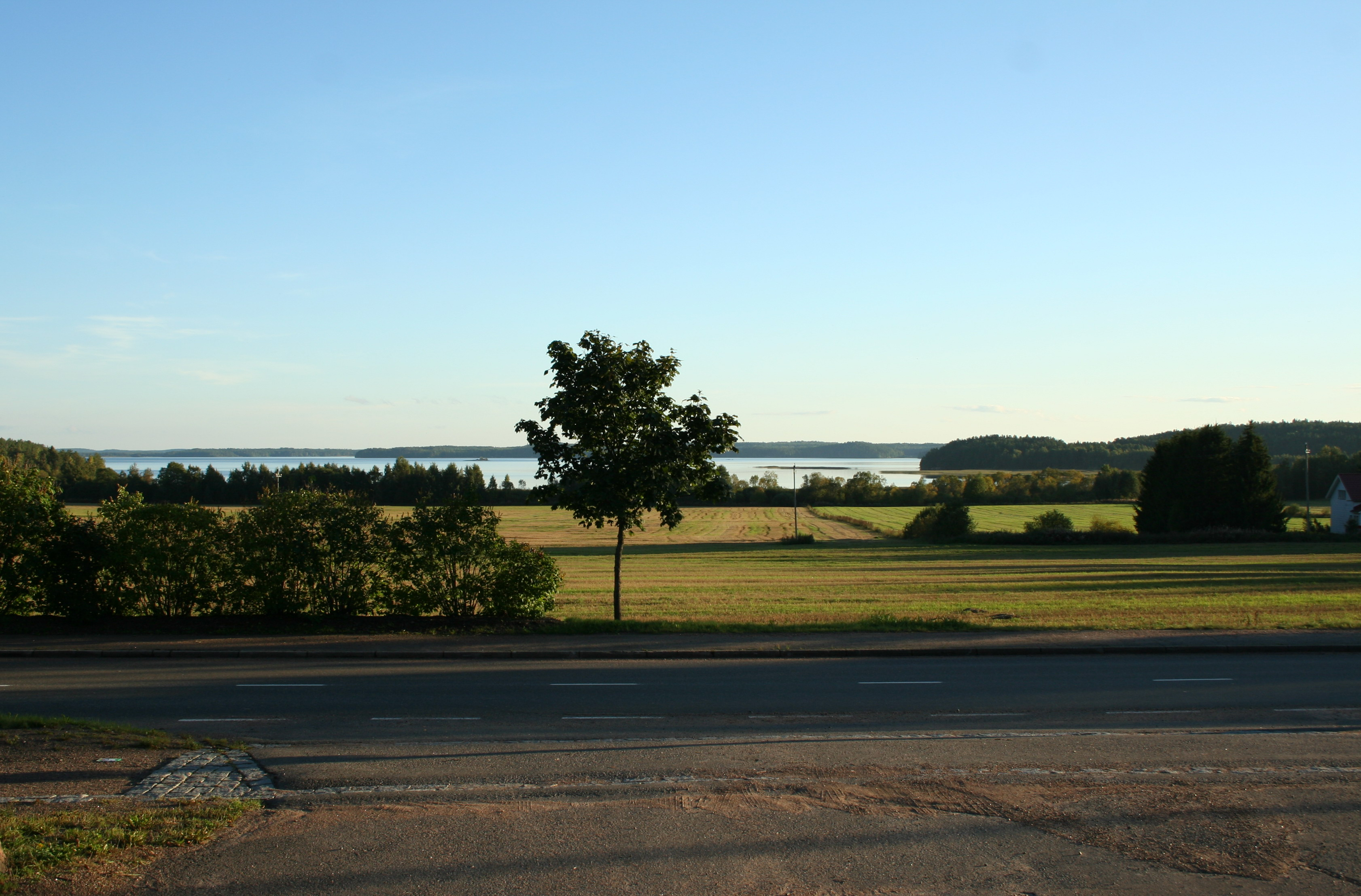
- Lake Pyhäjärvi

- Location within Finland
- Location: Kouvola Municipality
- Coordinates: 61°0.8′N 26°29.5′E
- Lake type: Natural
- Primary inflows: Lintukymi river
- Primary outflows: Kymijoki river
- Catchment area: Kymijoki
- Basin countries: Finland
- Surface area: 61.798 km^{2} (23.860 sq mi)
- Average depth: 4.24 m (13.9 ft)
- Max. depth: 22 m (72 ft)
- Water volume: 0.262 km^{3} (0.063 cu mi)
- Shore length^{1}: 177.32 km (110.18 mi)
- Surface elevation: 65.3 m (214 ft)
- Frozen: December-April
- Islands: Salonsaari, Hiidenvuori
- Settlements: Jaala
- ^{1} Shore length is not a well-defined measure.

Pyhäjärvi (Kymenlaakso) is a lake of Finland in the Kouvola Municipality in the region Kymenlaakso. It is a medium-sized lake in the Kymijoki main catchment area. There are 39 lakes with this name in Finland. Pyhäjärvi is also the name of a municipality Pyhäjärvi in the region of Northern Ostrobothnia. There is a Kimola canal from Pyhäjärvi to Konnivesi.

== See also ==
- List of lakes in Finland
