= Valto Koski =

Finnish politician (born 1939)

Member of the Parliament of Finland
- In office 1995–2011

Member of the Kuusankoski municipal council
- In office 1977–2000

Personal details
- Born: 23 January 1939 (age 87) Jaala
- Party: Social Democratic Party of Finland
- Awards: Knight First Class of the Order of the White Rose of Finland; Cross of Merit of the Order of the Lion of Finland; Medal for Military Merits

Valto Kalevi Koski (born 23 January 1939 in Jaala) is a Finnish plumber and politician. He was a member of the Parliament of Finland from 1995 to 2011, representing the Social Democratic Party of Finland (SDP).
