= Vuolenkoski =

- Village
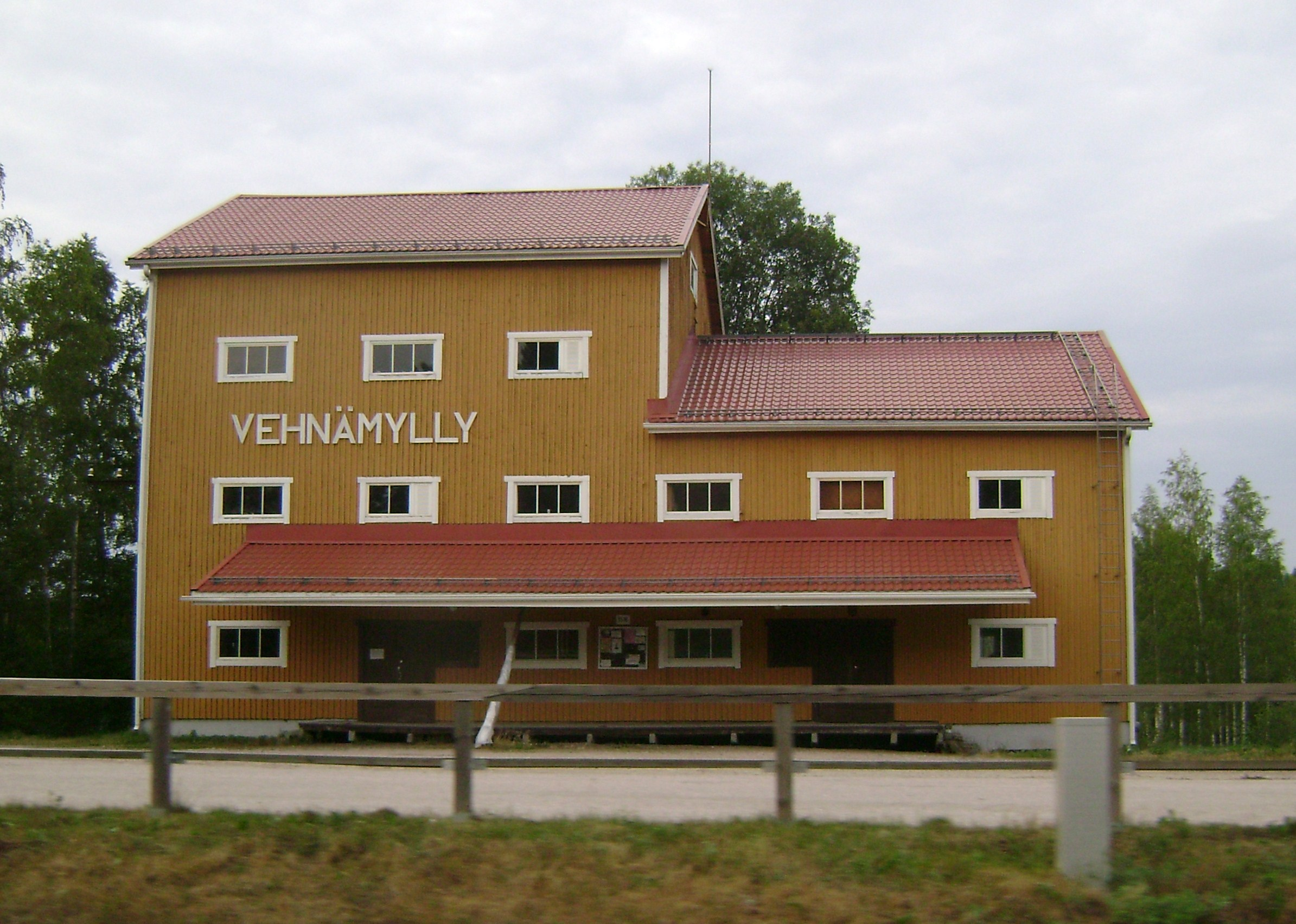
- A mill in Vuolenkoski

- Location in Finland
- Coordinates: 61°05.10′N 26°10.14′E
- Country: Finland
- Region: Päijät-Häme
- Municipality: Iitti
- Time zone: UTC+2 (EET)
  - Summer (DST): UTC+3 (EEST)
- Postal code: 19160

Vuolenkoski (Finnish pronunciation: [ˈʋuo̯leŋˌkoski]) is a village located in the northern part of Iitti municipality in Päijät-Häme, Finland. Kymi River flows south of the village.

Vuolenkoski has an elementary school, a sports field, a café and a volunteer fire department. The village also has a popular lakeshore bar restaurant Rantamesta, which is open only in summer.

== See also ==
- Jaala
- Kausala
- Vierumäki
