= Kausala =

- Village
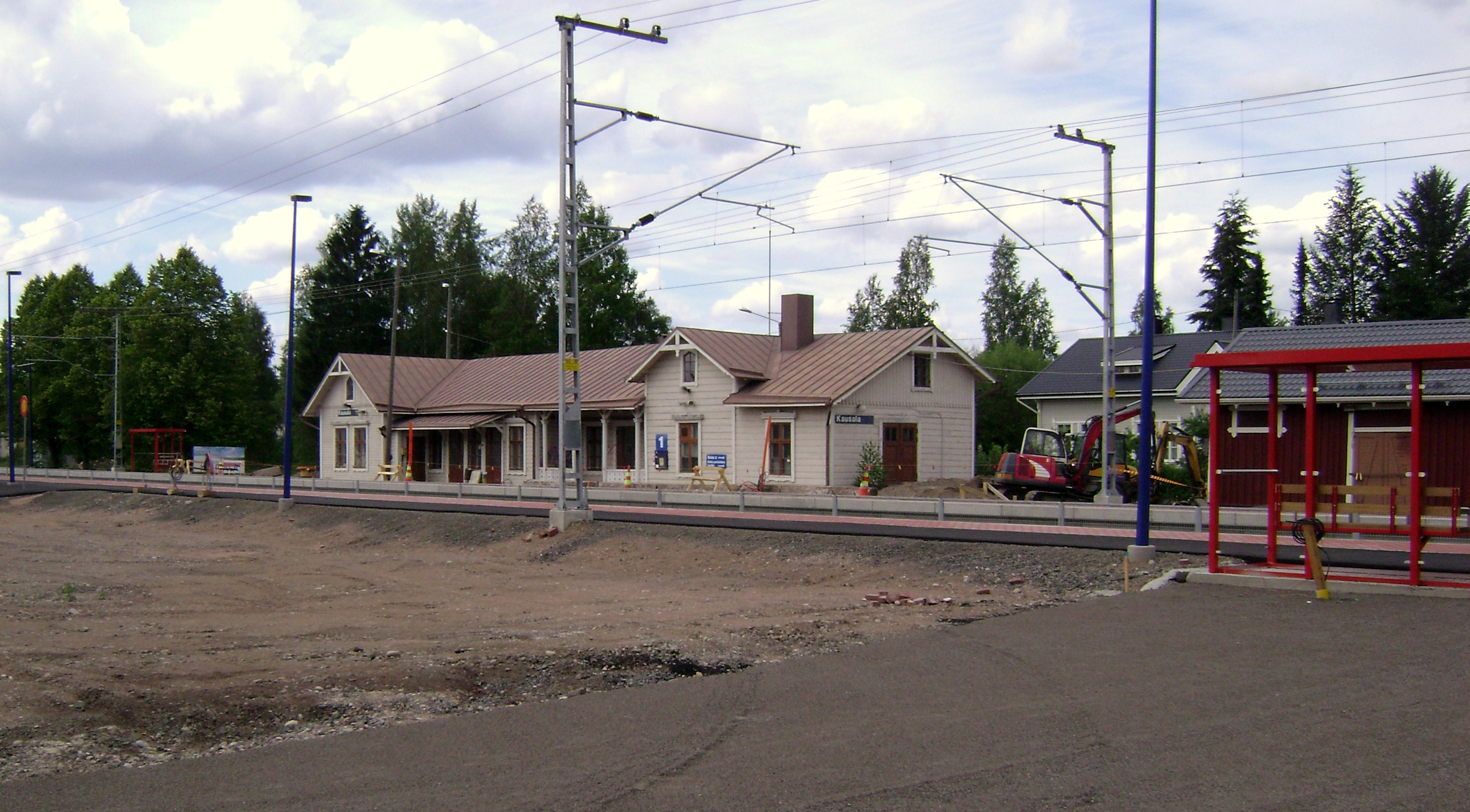
- Kausala Railway Station

- Location in Finland
- Coordinates: 60°53.17′N 26°20.49′E
- Country: Finland
- Region: Päijät-Häme
- Municipality: Iitti

Area
  - Urban: 887 km^{2} (342 sq mi)

Population (2018-12-31)
  - Village: 3,775
  - Density: 4,256/km^{2} (11,020/sq mi)
- Time zone: UTC+2 (EET)
  - Summer (DST): UTC+3 (EEST)
- Postal code: 47400

Kausala (Finnish: [ˈkɑu̯sɑlɑ]) is a village and administrative center in Iitti municipality in Päijät-Häme, Finland. Kausala has a population of 3,775, which makes it the largest village of the municipality in terms of population. The significance of Kausala for the municipality is largely due to its central location along the highway, Finnish national road 12 (Vt12), and the Lahti–Kouvola railway passing through the village. The nearest lakes are Lake Leininselkä and Lake Urajärvi in the northern part of the village.

There are several shops in Kausala, such as S-market and K-Market grocery stores, and Iitin Maatilatori, the municipality's own village store. The village also has three schools and three kindergartens, a library, an ice rink and a health center. KymiRing motor racing circuit is located in the vicinity of the village. In the western part of the village, along the highway, there is also a resting place Matkakeidas Kausala.

== See also ==
- Kouvola
- Nastola
- Vuolenkoski
