= Kymi Ring =

Motor Racing Circuit in Finland

KymiRing
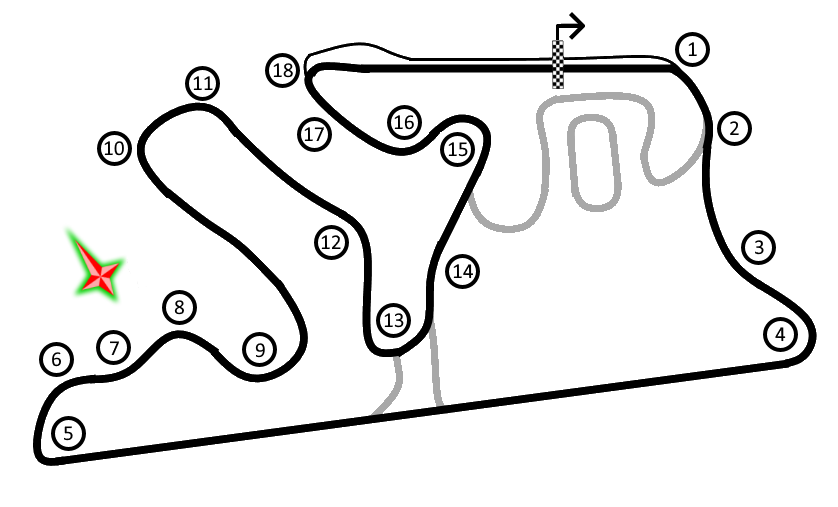
- Main Circuit (2019–present)
- Location: Kausala, Iitti, Päijät-Häme, Finland
- Coordinates: 60°52′38″N 026°28′55″E
- Capacity: 35,000 seats 100,000+ total
- FIA Grade: 6RW (Rallycross circuit)
- Owner: TRP Hungary (February 2024–present)
- Broke ground: June 2016; 9 years ago
- Opened: 19 August 2019; 6 years ago
- Architect: Apex Circuit Design
- Major events: Former: FIA World Rallycross Championship; World RX of Finland (2025); Motocross World Championship (2025)
- Website: www.kymiring.com

Main Circuit (2019–present)
- Surface: Asphalt
- Length: 4.650 km (2.889 mi)
- Turns: 18

East Circuit (2019–present)
- Surface: Asphalt
- Length: 2.440 km (1.516 mi)
- Turns: 5

West Circuit (2019–present)
- Surface: Asphalt
- Length: 2.220 km (1.379 mi)
- Turns: 10

Rallycross Circuit (2019–present)
- Surface: Asphalt & Gravel
- Length: 1.56 km (0.97 mi)
- Turns: 7

The KymiRing is a motor racing circuit in Kausala of the Iitti municipality, Päijät-Häme, Finland, bordering the Kymenlaakso's regional capital Kouvola, and located 110-kilometre (68 mi) north-east of the capital Helsinki. It was planned that it would be the first circuit in Finland to hold an FIA Grade 1 license. While the circuit itself was built to meet both Formula 1 and MotoGP specifications, hosting a Formula 1 Grand Prix would require substantial investment in both the track's facilities and in race hosting fees.

The track was officially opened on 19 August 2019 with a small MotoGP test. In July 2022, the developer was reported as being in administration.

The name "Kymi" comes from the Kymi River (Kymijoki), in the valley of which the race track is located.

== Facilities ==
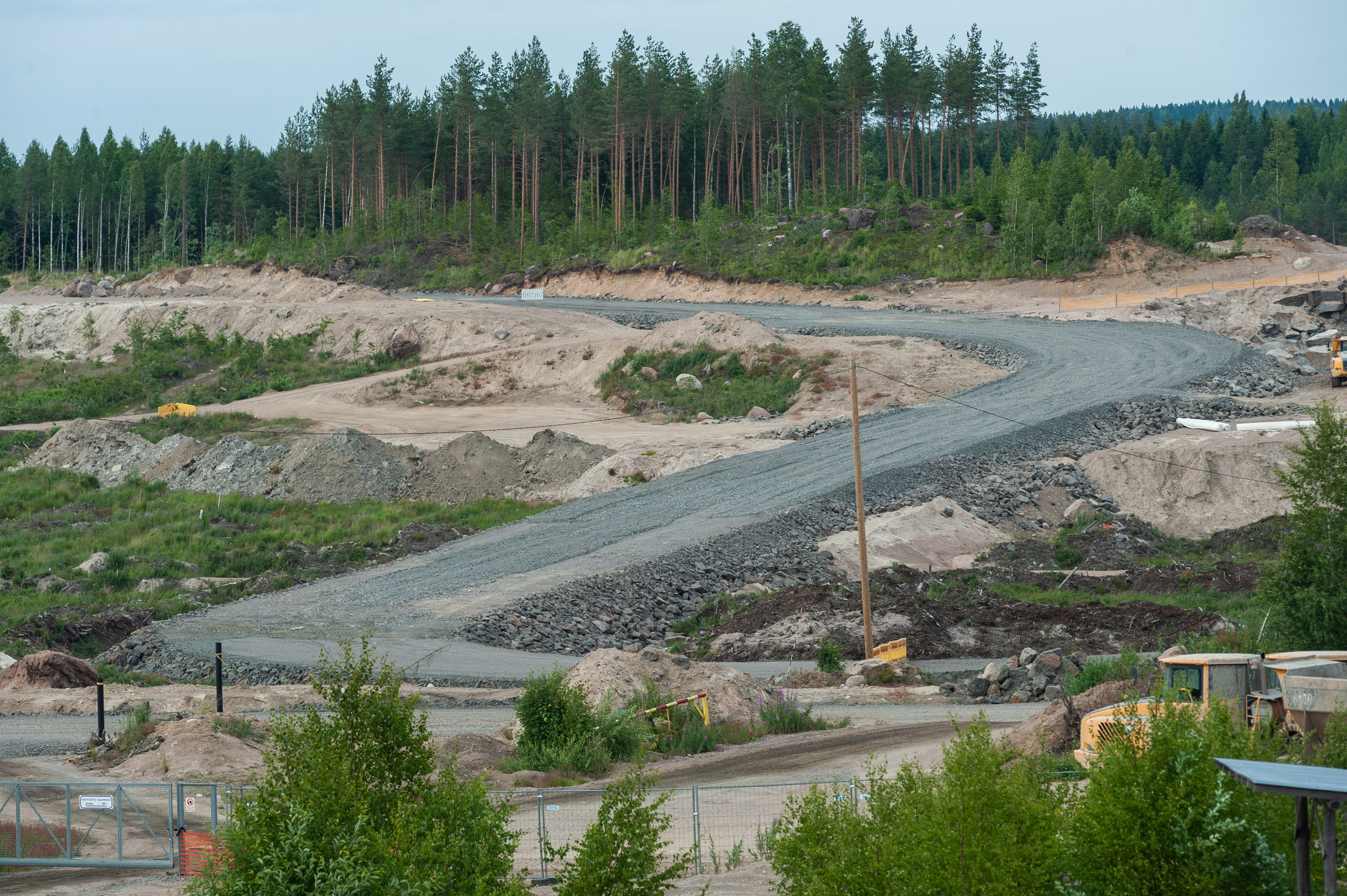
KymiRing in June 2018

The main racetrack, designed by Pohjola and Apex Circuit Design Ltd is 4.650 km (2.889 mi) long. In addition, the complex will have a 1.56 km (0.97 mi) rallycross track with a 0.1-kilometre (0.062 mi) joker lap, diverting from the main circuit's finish line.

Driver training facilities for the use of local driving schools are located next to the main track, using parts of the track to provide various customisable training modules. A traffic safety theme park for families with children is also included in the plans.

Kymi Ring in its entirety covers an area of 1.8 km^{2} (0.69 sq mi). The infield of the track can be utilised as a venue for fairs, festivals and other mass events, with room for hospitality and dining services. Potential businesses, especially those of the automotive trade, have been designated a business park area at the circuit's outskirts, next to the main road 12.

Accommodation services at the circuit consist mainly of trackside cabins, called "toy barns" by the circuit management.

As of September 2021, the track, paddock and offices have been completed, with the cost of 30 million Euro. The track has permits to build for 150,000m² of floor space, with 9,000m² currently being used. No hotels or grandstands exist yet.

In June 2022, the developer was reported as being in administration, due to two construction companies filing for a non-payment total of €634,000. In February 2024, the circuit was purchased by a Hungarian consortium.

== Competitions ==
In July 2017, Kymi Ring and Dorna Sports, the commercial rights holder of MotoGP, signed a five-year contract for organising the Finnish motorcycle Grand Prix. It would be the first time motorcycle racing's premier class would race in the country since 1981.

The event was initially supposed to be on the 2020 MotoGP calendar but was cancelled due to the COVID-19 pandemic. It was also on the 2021 MotoGP calendar but was later postponed to 2022. Concerns over the circuit were discussed by riders at a Safety Commission meeting at Le Mans. On 25 May 2022, it was announced that the event would once again be removed from the 2022 World Championship season, due to incomplete homologation works together with the risks caused by the ongoing geopolitical situation in the region by the Russian invasion of Ukraine.

Ongoing financial troubles and incomplete construction resulted in the FIM Motocross World Championship and Nitro Rallycross cancelling their August 2022 races at the track. The former moved the event to Hyvinkää, while the latter opted not to replace the date with a different location.

In September 2024, it was announced that the circuit will host FIA World Rallycross Championship races for three years starting from 2025.

In July 2025, MXGP competition was organized in Kymiring.
