= Iitti =

Iitti Itis
- Municipality
- Iitin kunta Itis kommun
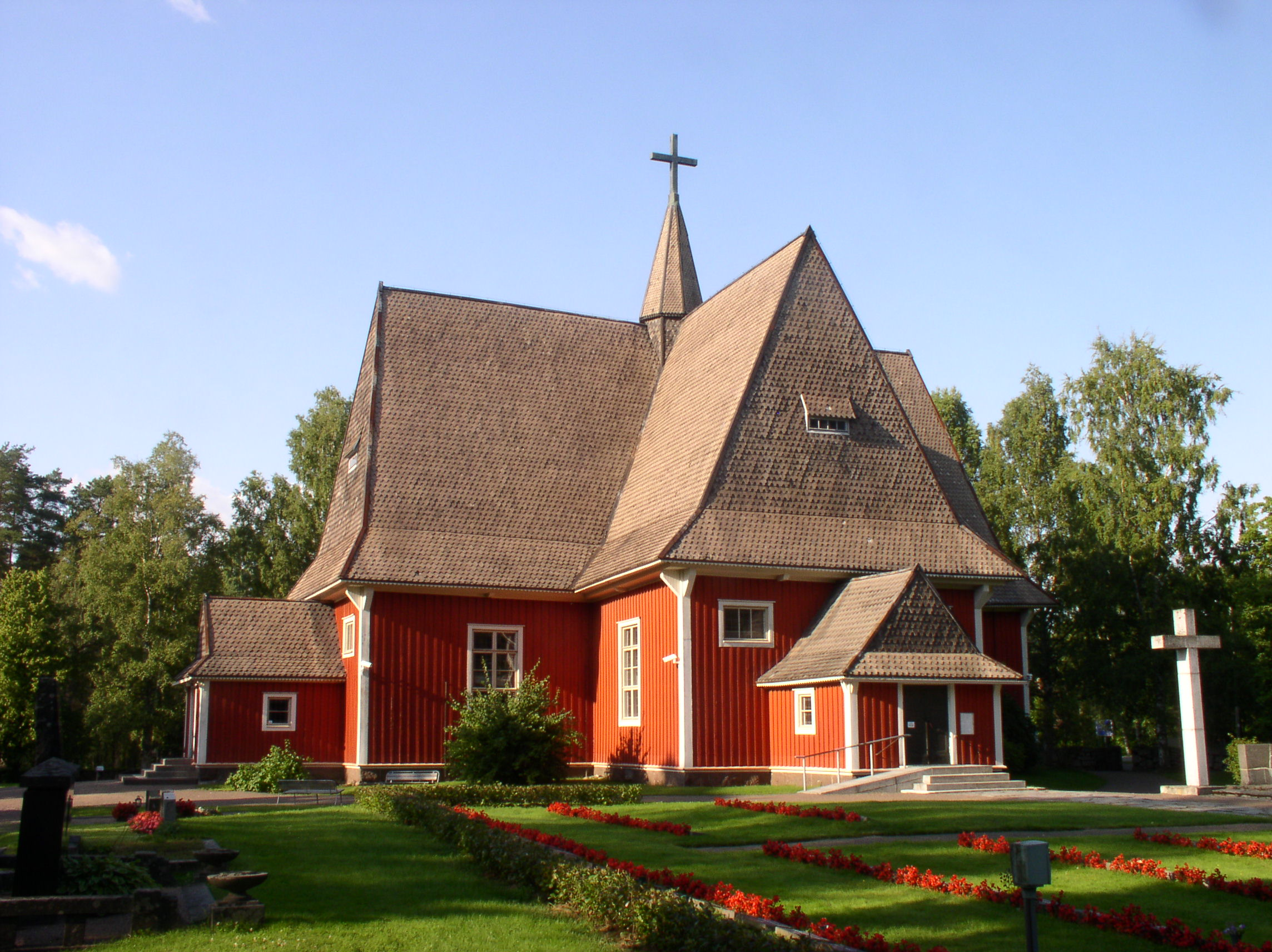
- Church

- Coat of arms

- Location of Iitti in Finland
- Interactive map of Iitti
- Coordinates: 60°53′N 026°20′E
- Country: Finland
- Region: Päijät-Häme
- Sub-region: Lahti
- Founded (parish): 1539
- Charter: 1865
- Seat: Kausala

Government
  - Municipality manager: Jarkko Salonen

Area (2018-01-01)
  - Total: 687.09 km^{2} (265.29 sq mi)
  - Land: 589.81 km^{2} (227.73 sq mi)
  - Water: 97.27 km^{2} (37.56 sq mi)
  - Rank: 142nd largest in Finland

Population (2025-12-31)
  - Total: 6,329
  - Rank: 144th largest in Finland
  - Density: 10.73/km^{2} (27.8/sq mi)

Population by native language
  - Finnish: 97.2% (official)
  - Swedish: 0.2%
  - Others: 2.7%

Population by age
  - 0 to 14: 14%
  - 15 to 64: 54.5%
  - 65 or older: 31.5%
- Time zone: UTC+02:00 (EET)
  - Summer (DST): UTC+03:00 (EEST)
- Climate: Dfc
- Website: www.iitti.fi

Iitti (Finnish: [ˈiːtːi]; Swedish: Itis) is a municipality of Finland. It is located in the province of Southern Finland and is part of the Päijät-Häme region. The municipality has a population of 6,329 (31 December 2025) and covers an area of 687.09 square kilometres (265.29 sq mi) of which 97.27 km^{2} (37.56 sq mi) is water. The population density is 10.73 inhabitants per square kilometre (27.8/sq mi). Neighbour municipalities are Heinola, Kouvola, Lapinjärvi, Lahti and Orimattila. The municipality is unilingually Finnish.

The current administrative center of Iitti is in the village of Kausala. In 1990, the historical center of Iitti, which surrounds the old parish church, was voted the most attractive kirkonkylä ("church village") in Finland.

In the coat of arms of Iitti, the gray wavy fess refers to Kymi River and the key above it to the municipality's central position along the river. The coat of arms was designed by heraldist Ahti Hammar, and was officially confirmed for use on 3 March 1953.

The Kymi Ring motor sport center is located in Iitti, right next to the border of Kouvola.

== History ==
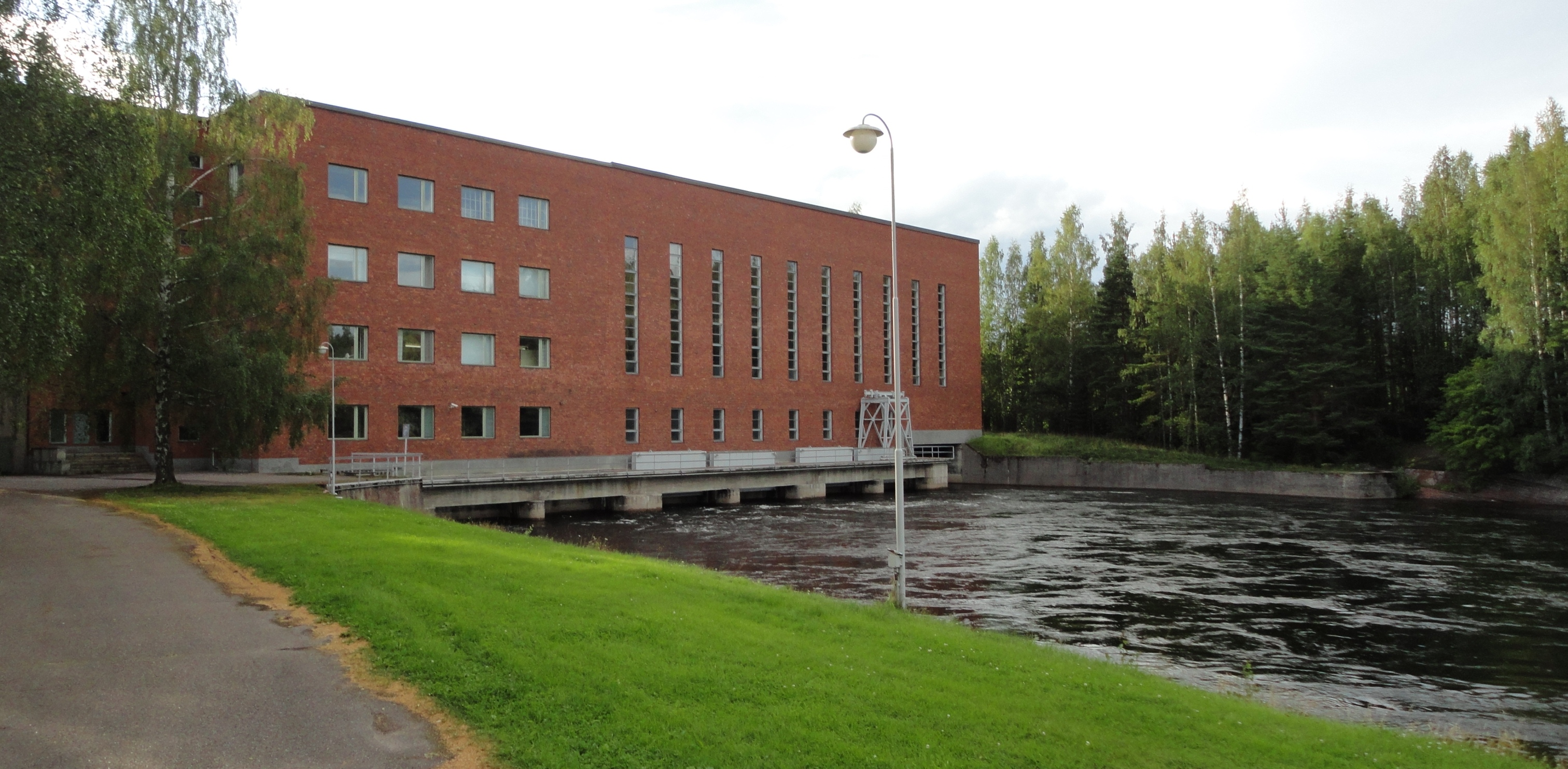
Mankala hydropower plant

The surroundings of lakes Urajärvi and Pyhäjärvi have been known to be exploited as wilderness since the Stone Age, although no signs of permanent habitation from the era have been found, and the area is presumed to have been entirely uninhabitated in the interim between the Stone Age and the conversion of Finland to Christianity. By the end of paganism, Iitti had gained its first permanent inhabitants first from Hauho and Vanaja, as well as later on from Hollola.

The oldest village in Iitti is presumed to be Kauramaa, though several others are mentioned in documents dating to the Middle Ages. Administratively, Iitti was a chapel subordinated to the parish of Hollola until 1539, after which it became an independent parish that also included Nastola, Jaala, Valkeala and parts of Mäntyharju, by proclamation from Gustav I. At this time, Iitti had 14 villages and 89 estates.

Iitti suffered greatly over the Russo-Swedish War of 1788–1790, becoming a battleground as well as a headquarters for Swedish forces. The battle of Tillolankangas was one of the bloodiest over the entire war in Finland; the Swedes' victory cemented the liberation of the villages around river Kymi. Over the course of the war, 13 villages were destroyed in Iitti.

Iitti was part of the Kymenlaakso region until 2021, when it was transferred to Päijät-Häme.

== Geography ==
=== Villages ===
In 1968, Iitti had the following villages:

- Haapakimola
- Kauramaa
- Kausala
- Kimola
- Iitti
- Koliseva
- Koskenniska
- Lyöttilä
- Kymentaka
- Muikkula
- Niinimäki
- Perheniemi
- Radansuu
- Saaranen
- Sitikkala
- Säyhde
- Sääskjärvi
- Taasia
- Tapola
- Vuolenkoski

== Demographics ==
In 2020, 14.0% of the population of Iitti was under the age of 15, 55.2% were aged 15 to 64, and 31.5% were over the age of 64. The average age was 48.8, above the national average of 43.4 and regional average of 46.4. Speakers of Finnish made up 97.9% of the population and speakers of Swedish made up 0.2%, while the share of speakers of foreign languages was 1.9%. Foreign nationals made up 1.4% of the total population.

At the end of March 2021, the population of Iitti was 6,590. The chart below, describing the development of the total population of Iitti from 1975 to 2020, encompasses the municipality's area as of 2021.

Historical population

Year	Pop.	±% p.a.
1975	7,995	—
1980	7,770	−0.57%
1985	7,690	−0.21%
1990	7,889	+0.51%
1995	7,687	−0.52%

Year	Pop.	±% p.a.
2000	7,534	−0.40%
2005	7,265	−0.72%
2010	7,005	−0.73%
2015	6,910	−0.27%
2020	6,625	−0.84%

Source: Statistics Finland

=== Urban areas ===
In 2019, out of the total population of 6,711, 3,946 people lived in urban areas and 2,705 in sparsely populated areas, while the coordinates of 60 people were unknown. This made Iitti's degree of urbanization 59.3%. The urban population in the municipality was divided between two urban areas as follows:

#	Urban area	Population
1	Kausala	3,702
2	Iitti parish village	244

== Economy ==
In 2018, 10.2% of the workforce of Iitti worked in primary production (agriculture, forestry and fishing), 35.9% in secondary production (e.g. manufacturing, construction and infrastructure), and 50.8% in services. In 2019, the unemployment rate was 9.2%, and the share of pensioners in the population was 35.8%.

The ten largest employers in Iitti in 2019 were as follows:

1. Halton Oy, 257 employees
2. Municipality of Iitti, 199 employees
3. Päijät-Häme Health Care Municipal Consortium, 149 employees
4. Kiitokori Oy, 61 employees
5. Kymen Seudun Osuuskauppa, 46 employees
6. SharpCell Oy, 42 employees
7. Dinair Clean Air Oy, 40 employees
8. Iitin Ehtookotiyhdistys ry, 31 employees
9. Kausalan Matkakeidas Oy, 29 employees
10. Kaupe Oy, 21 employees

== Culture ==
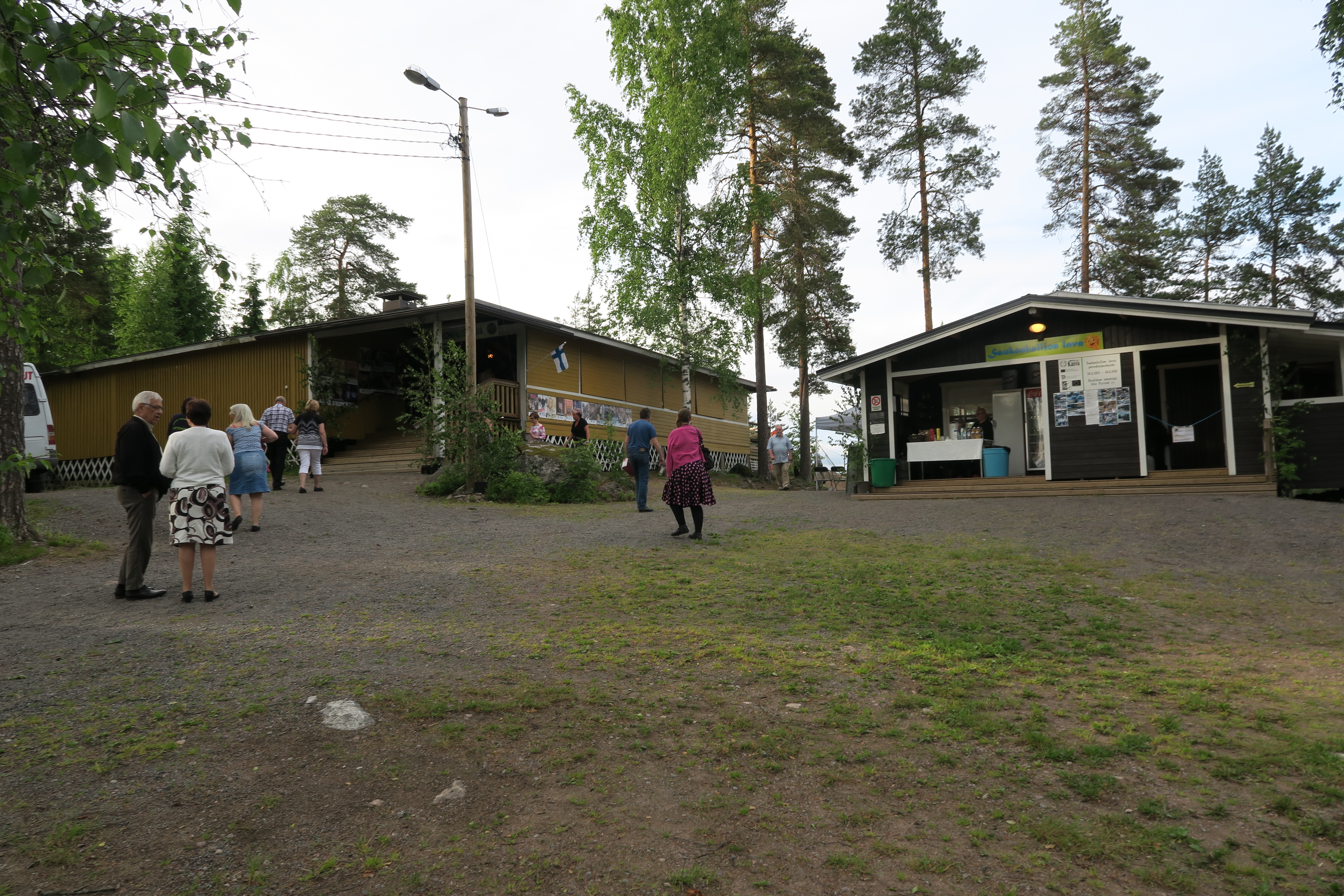
Saukonkallio dance hall

=== Events ===
The Iitti Music Festival (Iitin musiikkijuhlat), which focuses on both classical and contemporary music, is held annually in Iitti's church village.

=== Food ===
In the 1980s, a lamb meat called lampahkäppä, a sweetened potato casserole called potaattiloota, a rye lingonberry pastries baked with cabbage leaves called lehikäiset served with plum saftsuppe, and a local baked cheese were named traditional dishes of Iitti parish.

=== Media ===
Iitti has its own local newspaper called Iitinseutu, whose editorial office is located in Kausala.

The 2023 Finnish slasher horror film The Island of Doom (Tuomion saari), directed by Keke Soikkeli, was shot in Iitti.

== Notable residents ==
- Albert Järvinen (1950–1991) – guitarist; member of Hurriganes
- Lasse J. Laine (1946–2023) – naturalist
- Mikko Pesälä (born 1938) – politician
- Anders Johan Sjögren (1794–1855) – linguist and explorer
