= Jaala =

- Former municipality
- Jaalan kunta Jaala kommun
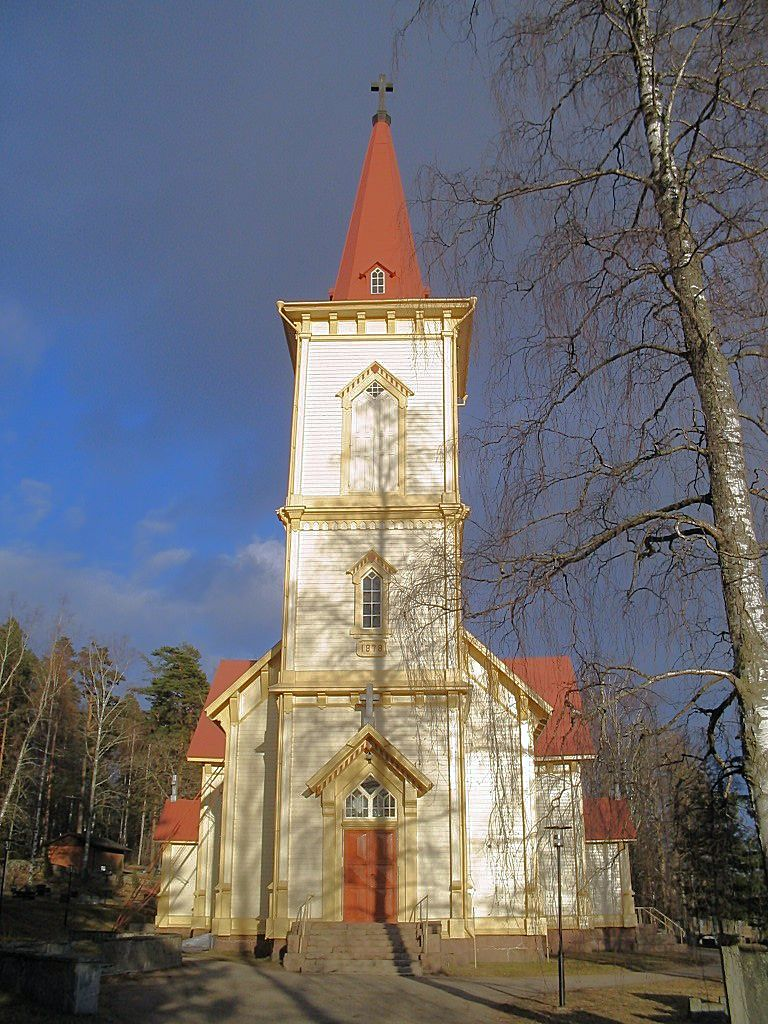
- Jaala Church

- Coat of arms

- Location in Finland
- Coordinates: 61°3′0″N 26°28′55″E
- Country: Finland
- Province: Southern Finland
- Region: Kymenlaakso

Area
  - Total: 217.40 sq mi (563.06 km^{2})
  - Water: 50.15 sq mi (129.89 km^{2})

Population (2003)
  - Total: 1,906
- Climate: Dfc

Jaala is a former municipality of Finland.

It is located in the province of Southern Finland and is part of the Kymenlaakso region. The municipality had a population of 1,906 (2003) and covered an area of 563.06 km² of which 129.89 km² was water. The population density was 3.4 inhabitants per km².

The municipality was unilingually Finnish.

In 2009, the six municipalities of Kouvola, Kuusankoski, Elimäki, Anjalankoski, Valkeala and Jaala were consolidated to form a new municipality named Kouvola, which, with a population of over 80,000, became the tenth largest city in Finland.

== People born in Jaala ==
- Valto Koski (1939 – )
- Ville Iiskola (1985 – )

== See also ==
- Vuolenkoski
