= Höytiä =

- Village
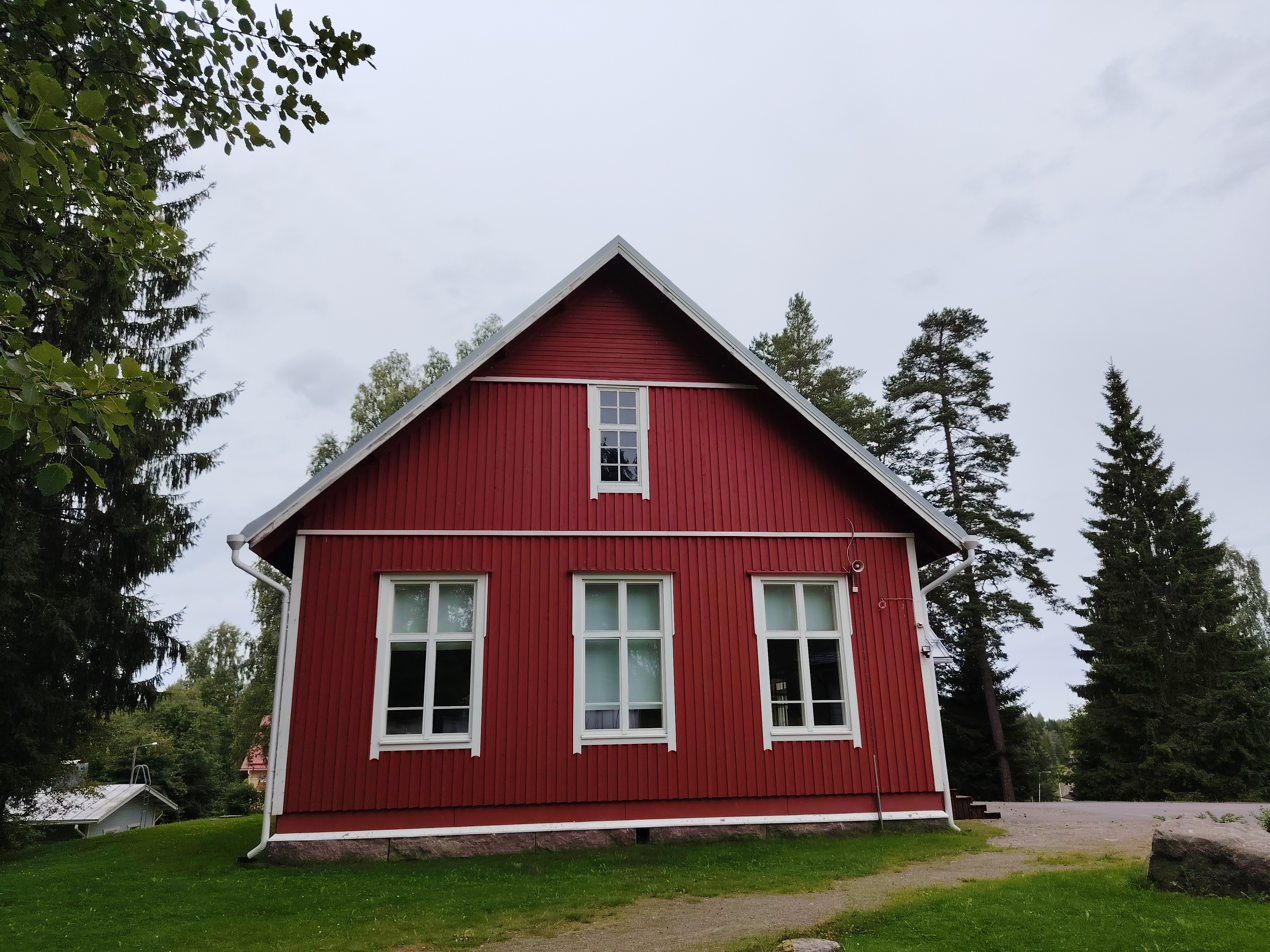
- Höytiä school

- Location in Central Finland Höytiä (Finland)
- Coordinates: 62.425°N 25.374°E
- Country: Finland
- Region: Central Finland
- Sub-region: Jyväskylä sub-region
- Municipality: Uurainen

Population (2015)
  - Total: ~300
- Time zone: UTC+2 (EET)
  - Summer (DST): UTC+3 (EEST)

Höytiä is a village in Uurainen, Finland, located in the southern part of the municipality near the border with Jyväskylä. As of 2015, about 300 people lived in the village.

== Etymology ==
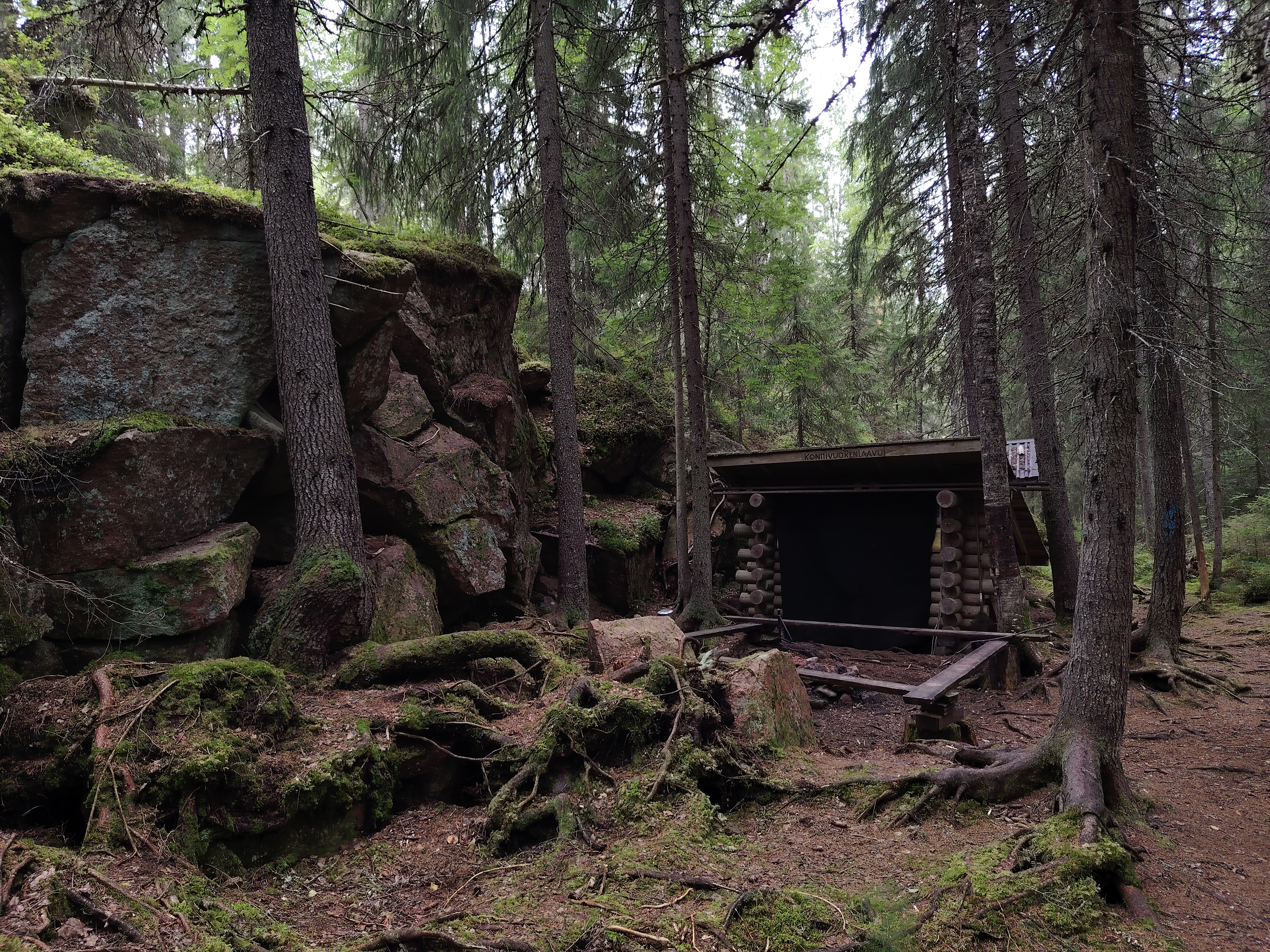
A lean-to shelter at Konttivuori.

According to Saulo Kepsu, the name of Höytiä and other place names with Höyt- (e.g. Höytiäinen) are derived from the word höyty or höytyvä meaning 'fluff (of a flower)'.

== Geography ==
Höytiä is located in the southern part of Uurainen near the municipal border with Jyväskylä and Petäjävesi, along the road 6250 connecting Uuraisten kirkonkylä (the municipal center) to the village of Kintaus in Petäjävesi.

Notable natural sites in Höytiä include Matosuo, a 142-hectare (350-acre) bog that has largely been drained, but still has some natural sections which, along with the Matolampi pond, are locally significant bird habitats. There is also a 1.3-kilometer (0.81 mi) guided nature trail around the Konttivuori outcrops, which were protected in 1993.

== History ==
The first farms in Höytiä were established in the 18th century as tenant farms under older farms in Uuraisten kirkonkylä and Kyynämöinen. On 22 February 1856, twelve farms from Soukkajärvi were transferred from the Jyväskylä parish to Uurainen, at the time a subordinate parish under Saarijärvi, including many in modern Höytiä, such as Heinäaho, Laitala, Matomäki, Peuramäki, Riihimäki and Teivaistenaho. Uurainen became an independent parish on 10 February 1868.

A road connecting Uuraisten kirkonkylä to Kintaus was built through Höytiä in 1906. In 1915, the road was connected to the highway between Uuraisten kirkonkylä and Jyväskylä.

== Services ==
There is a school in Höytiä for grades 1–4 of peruskoulu, grades 5–9 attend school in central Uurainen. It was established in 1906. The school has two buildings, an older timber building from 1912 and a newer building from 1937, both of which are classified as regionally significant. An indoor sports hall was finished in 2016.
