= Nyrölä =

- District of Jyväskylä
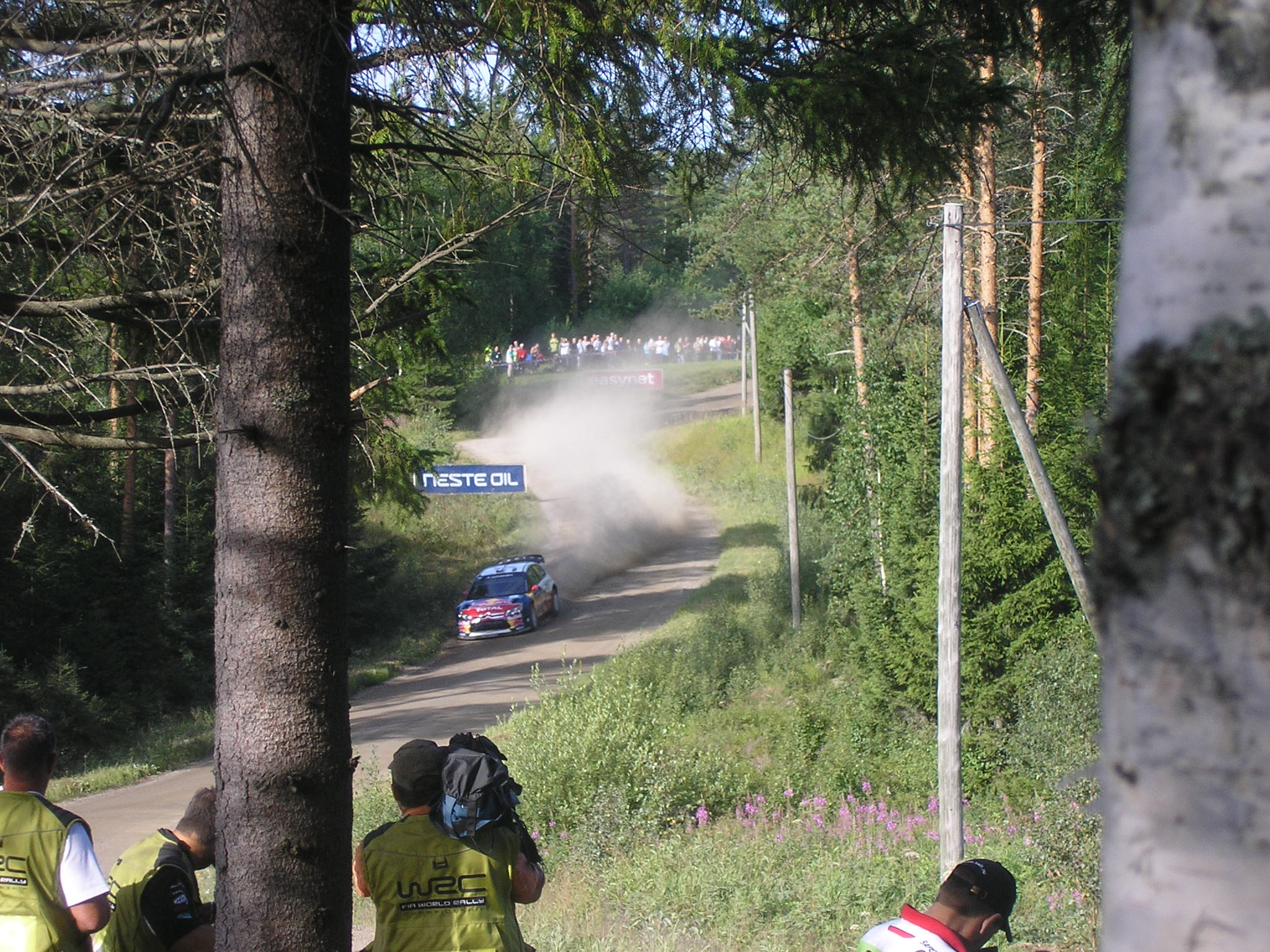
- Dani Sordo during Rally Finland in Mökkiperä, Nyrölä

- Location in Central Finland
- Coordinates: 62°21′47.05″N 25°28′59.27″E
- Country: Finland
- Region: Central Finland
- Sub-region: Jyväskylä sub-region
- City: Jyväskylä
- Ward: Tikkakoski-Nyrölä

Population (2021-12-31)
  - Total: 282 (incl. Sikomäki)
- Time zone: UTC+2 (EET)
  - Summer (DST): UTC+3 (EEST)
- Postal code: 41140, 41940

Nyrölä (historically known as Soukkajärvi) is a village and district of Jyväskylä, Finland located 25–28 kilometres (16–17 mi) from the city centre, near the border with Petäjävesi and Uurainen. Prior to 2009, it was one of the villages of Jyväskylän maalaiskunta, a former municipality of Finland.

On 31 December 2021, the statistical area of Nyrölä had a population of 282.

Nyrölä Observatory, an amateur astronomical observatory, is located in Nyrölä. Mökkiperä Stage of Rally Finland is driven in Nyrölä.

== Geography ==
=== Location and boundaries ===
Nyrölä is located in the northwestern part of Jyväskylä at the border with Petäjävesi and Uurainen. The distance to downtown Jyväskylä is about 25–28 kilometres (16–17 mi), while that to Tikkakoski is 11 kilometres (6.8 mi).

Nyrölä was one of the official land register villages of Jyväskylä, including the areas of Hepoperä, Mökkiperä and Sikomäki, forming a salient between Uurainen and Petäjävesi. Nyrölä is also the name of the 58th district of Jyväskylä, covering much of the same area including Mökkiperä and Hepoperä, but not Sikomäki. It borders Uurainen in the north, Kuikka in the east, Vertaala in the southeast and Petäjävesi in the south.

The boundaries of Nyrölä as seen by locals are more varied. According to a survey by the city with 78 respondents from Nyrölä and Kuikka, locals may consider Nyrölä to extend into Vertaala, while Hepoperä is not commonly seen as part of the village. The centre of Nyrölä is located between the former school and the crossroads between the road to Kuikka and the road to Höytiä.

=== Nature ===
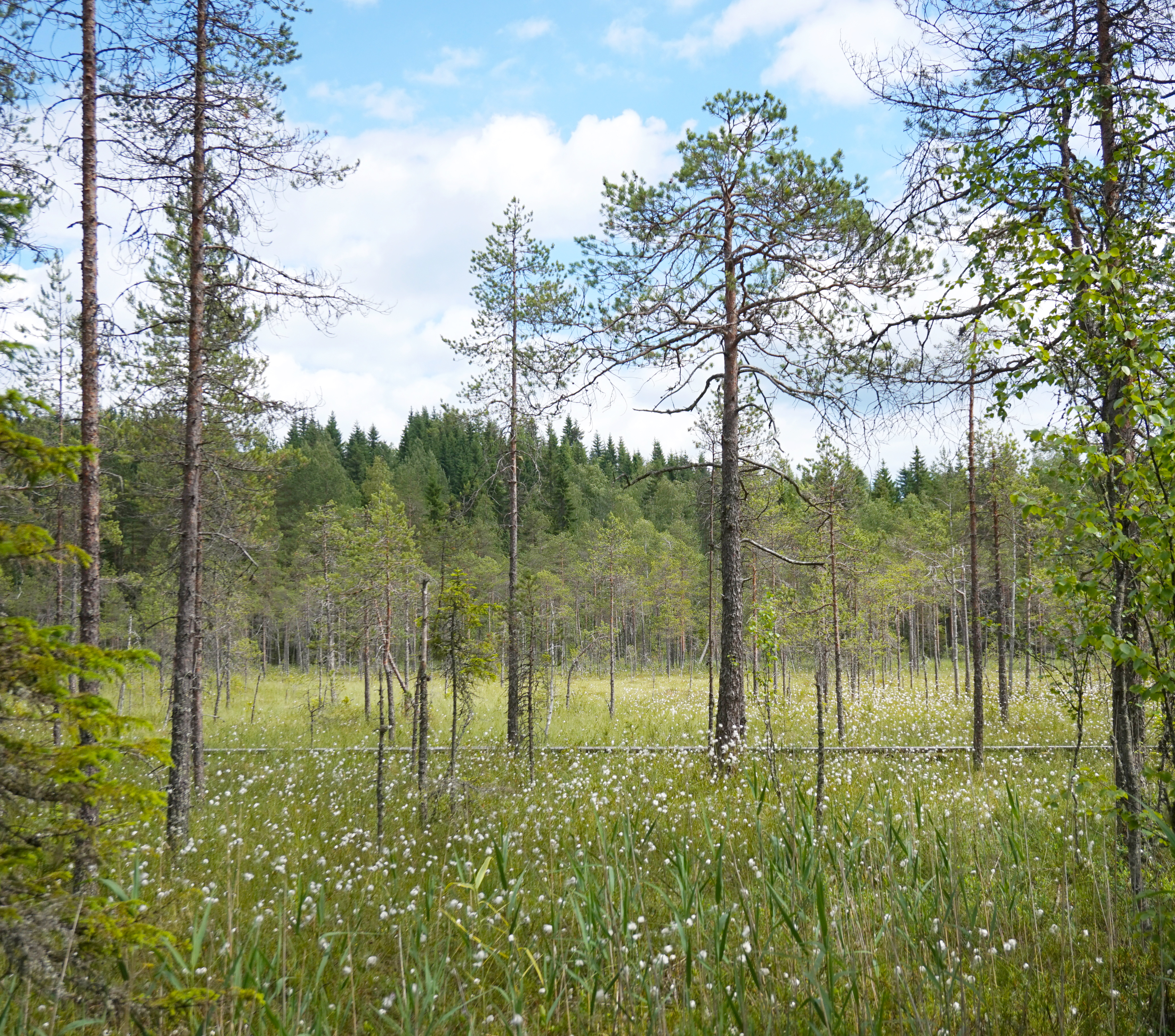
Peatland along the nature trail

The terrain of Nyrölä is characterized by multiple bogs and small lakes. While there are multiple hills reaching a height of at least 200 metres (660 ft) from sea level, the highest being Saksalanmäki at a height of 240 metres (790 ft), none of them are particularly prominent. The lowest point in the village is the lake Pajulampi, with a surface level of 169 metres (554 ft). Other lakes include Iso-Soukka, Iso-Musta and Lukkonen.

There is a 3.4-kilometre (2.1 mi) nature trail in the eastern part of Nyrölä, built between 2003 and 2004. It includes a cable ferry connection to an island in the northern part of Iso-Musta, as well as two lean-to shelters.

== History ==
Before being settled, the area of Soukkajärvi was used as hunting grounds, though the exact owners of the area are unknown. Based on a court document describing the borders of hunting grounds around modern Vesanka from 1530, it appears to have belonged to some farms in Pälkäne. In 1565, Soukkajärvi was settled by Paavali Rahikainen, who was likely from Pellosniemi (around modern Mikkeli), establishing his farm by the lake Iso-Soukka. The farm was divided into two in 1570. For an unknown reason, the surname of the Rahikainen family living in both farms changed to Nyrönen in 1579, after which the older farm came to be known as Nyrölä, eventually displacing Soukkajärvi as the village's name.

The newer farm, located on the shore of lake Kolmiloppi, was owned by the Oikarinen family since 1649, giving the farm its later name. The Nyrölä and Oikari farms were, respectively, divided into two in 1746 and 1759. In 1771, a tenant farm under Nyrölä, named Mäkiaho, became an independent farm.

In 1827, when the Great Partition was being carried out in the village, the Nyrölä farm was divided into four, named Heikkilä (Huovila), Koppeli, Mäkelä and Ristola. Other farms established around the time include Hepomäki (1843). The amount of farms was also increased by the transfer of the Sikomäki area from Vesanka to Nyrölä in the 1830s.

The Jyväskylä parish, including Soukkajärvi, was fully separated from Laukaa on 4 February 1856. However, on the 22nd of that month, twelve farms from Soukkajärvi were transferred to Uurainen, which was a subordinate parish of Saarijärvi until becoming independent on 10 February 1868. This included much of modern Höytiä as well as the Oikari farm. The area around the latter, Oikarinperä, is today seen as a section of the village of Jokihaara.

In 1870, Nyrölä comprised 22 independent farms and 11 tenant farms, increasing to 26 and 24 respectively by 1900. All tenant farms had become independent by 1945, when there were 75 farms in total. The population of Nyrölä peaked around 1950, when 557 people lived in the village.

The municipality of Jyväskylän maalaiskunta, including Nyrölä, was consolidated with the city of Jyväskylä in 2009. In the same year, Nyrölä was chosen as the regional village of the year (vuoden kylä).

== Services ==
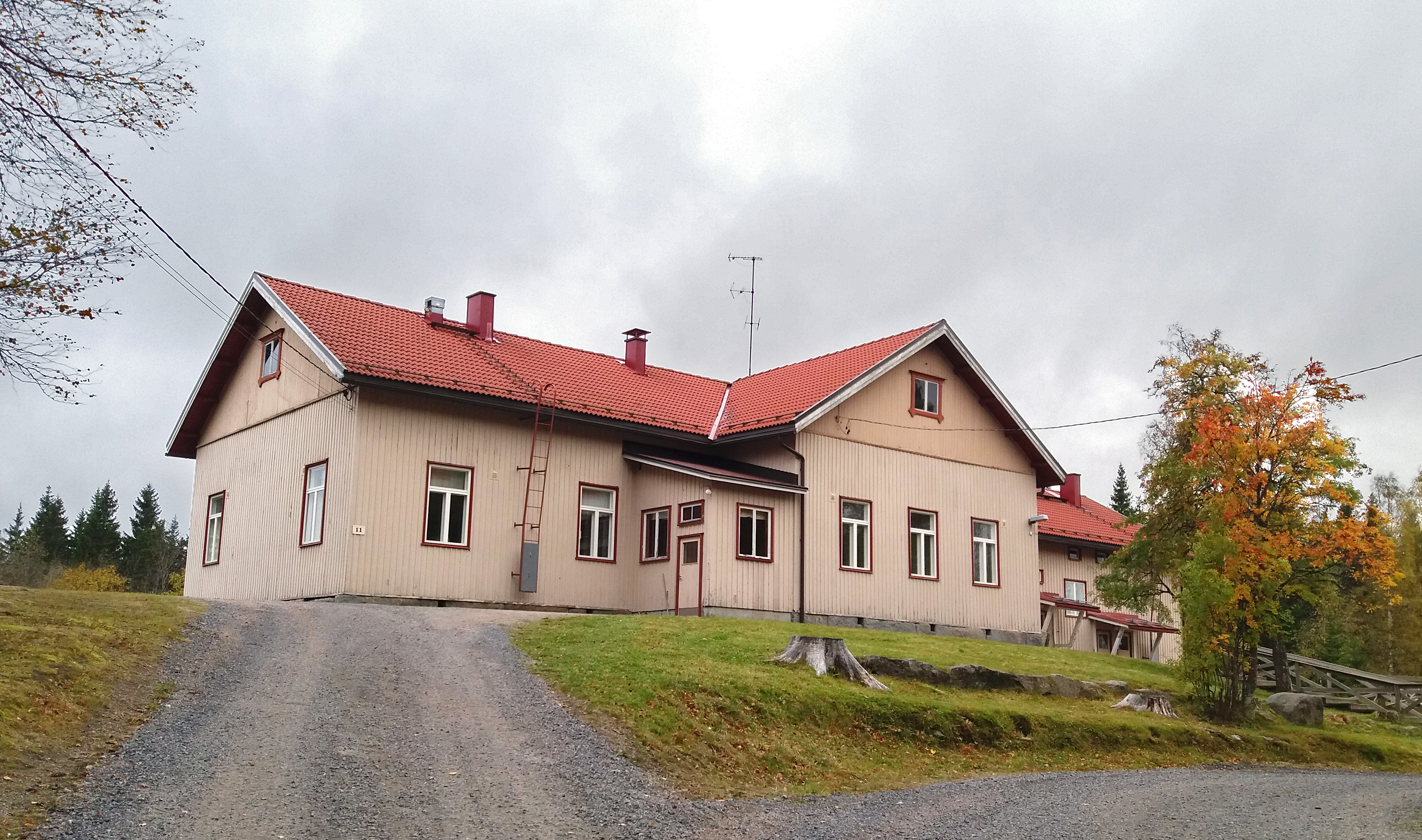
Nyrölä school in 2015

After the closure of the Nyrölä school in 2016, there have been no public services in the village, save for a municipal bookmobile. The nearest services are found mainly in Tikkakoski.

The school of Nyrölä was established in 1896. Classes were held mainly at the Jatkola farm until a separate main building was finished in 1900. In 1973, the municipality adopted the modern peruskoulu system, under which the Nyrölä school comprised grades 1–4, with education for upper grades held in Tikkakoski. The main building was fully renovated between 1986 and 1987. The school was closed in 2016 and its students were moved to Tikkakoski.

The Nyrölä Observatory, operated by a local astronomy club, was built in the late 1990s and a second telescope was acquired in 2002. In 2007, an underground planetarium called Kallioplanetaario was finished under the observatory. The company managing it went bankrupt in 2014, after which it has been open only on request.
