= Uuraisten kirkonkylä =

- Urban area
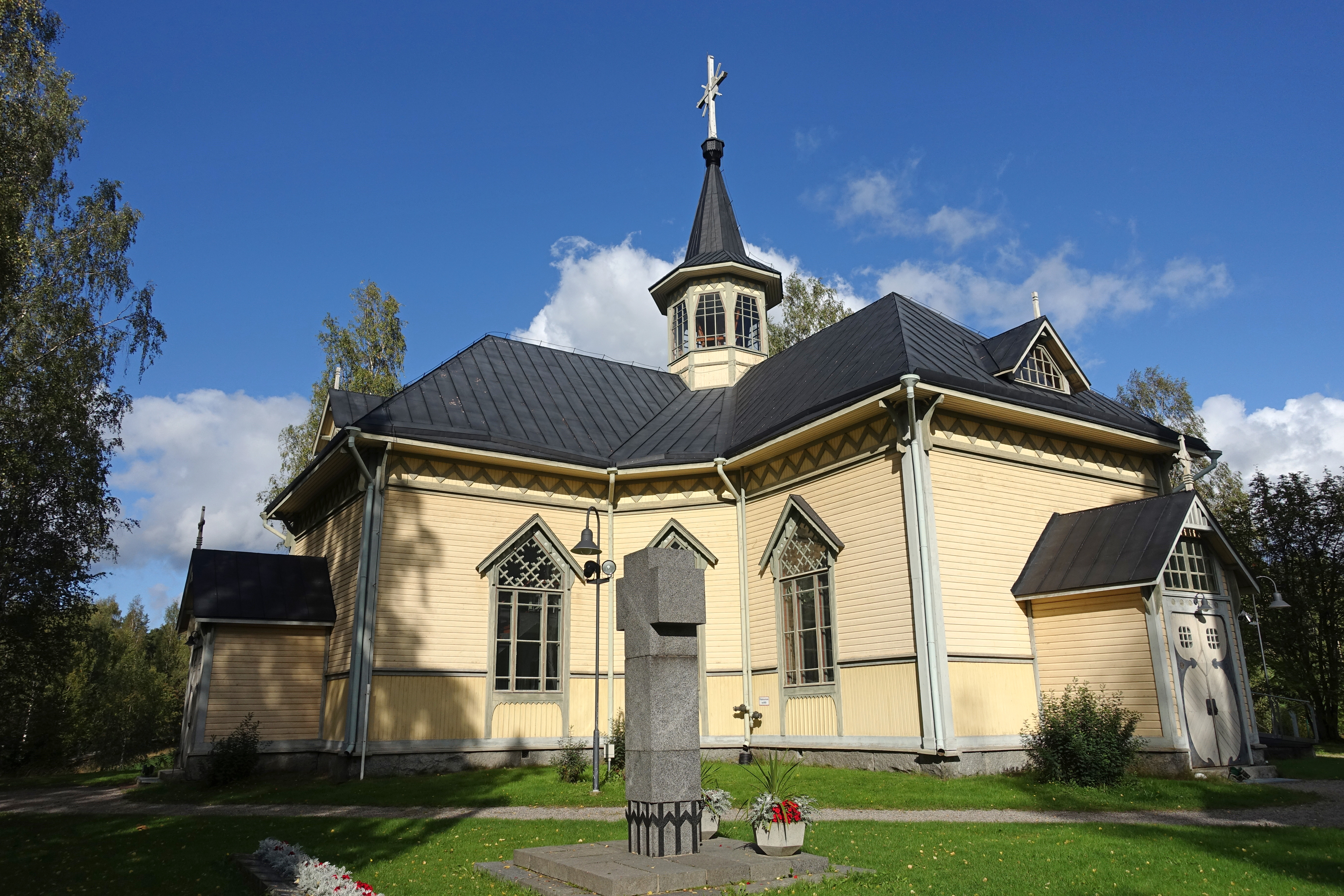
- Church of Uurainen in 2019

- Location in Central Finland Uuraisten kirkonkylä (Finland)
- Coordinates: 62.500°N 25.438°E
- Country: Finland
- Region: Central Finland
- Sub-region: Jyväskylä sub-region
- Municipality: Uurainen

Population (2023), urban area
  - Total: 1,027
  - Density: 269.6/km^{2} (698/sq mi)
- Time zone: UTC+2 (EET)
  - Summer (DST): UTC+3 (EEST)

Uuraisten kirkonkylä (lit. 'Uurainen church village') is an urban area (taajama) and the administrative center of the municipality of Uurainen, Finland, located in the northern part of the municipality near the border with Saarijärvi.

The area of Uuraisten kirkonkylä was historically known as Kuukkajärvi, which was an older village also covering modern Kyynämöinen and Hiirola. The first chapel was built in 1803 and the settlement became a municipal and parish center in 1868.

The urban area, as defined by Statistics Finland, had a population of 1,027 on 31 December 2023.

== Geography ==
Uuraisten kirkonkylä is located in the northern part of Uurainen near the border with Saarijärvi, at the crossing of the highways 627 (between Multia and Hirvaskangas) and 630 (to Puuppola in Jyväskylä). Both highways are connected to the national road 4. Sections of the urban area include Akonpuro, Mansikkamäki, Nevala, Paanala, Rinkilä-Tuomela, Simola and Turpeela. On 31 December 2023, the urban area of Uuraisten kirkonkylä had a population of 1,027, a surface area of 3.81 square kilometers (1.47 sq mi) and a population density of 269.6 inhabitants per square kilometer (698/sq mi).

Lakes around the urban area include Akko, Iso-Kuukka and Pikku-Kuukka.

== History ==
Before being settled, the area of Kuukkajärvi was known as Heinäjoensuu, which was owned by the village of Laitikkala in Kulsiala as hunting grounds. The first known farm in Kuukkajärvi was Salmela, which was established around 1548 by Paavo Minkkinen; in that year, the border between his lands and Kuivasmäki (in Petäjävesi) was delineated. Two new farms named Paanala and Hiironen, the former established by Paavo's brother Niilo Minkkinen and the latter by Paavo Hiironen, were mentioned in 1561. In that year, Kuukkajärvi was mentioned alongside the village of Akonjärvi, which was merged into Kuukkajärvi in 1586. Akonjärvi had comprised only one farm on the northwestern shore of lake Iso-Uurainen, established by Eerik Ruoranen. A second farm had been established near it around 1617 by Paavali Neuvonen. In the late 17th century, the farms came to be known as Pokelainen and Pirkkalainen after the families who acquired them around that time.

The village of Kuukkajärvi had, already since the 16th century, been subdivided into the land partition units (jakokunta) of Kyynämöinen, Kuukkajärvi/Minkkilä and Hiirola, of which Kuukkajärvi or Minkkilä covered the area around Iso-Kuukka, including the Paanala, Kässi and Minkkilä farms. Kässi was separated from Paanala in 1607, followed by Minkkilä in 1617. Uuraisten kirkonkylä, Kyynämöinen and Hiirola are today seen as distinct settlements.

Kuukkajärvi was at first part of the Rautalampi parish until 1593 and Laukaa until 1628, after which it was part of Saarijärvi. When the Saarijärvi parish was separated from Laukaa, the Pokelainen and Pirkkalainen farms remained part of Laukaa, splitting Kuukkajärvi between the two parishes. The villagers first sought to build their own church in 1787, which was opposed by parishioners from Saarijärvi proper. Another proposal was made in 1800 and was opposed by parish priest Erik Roschier. However, the villagers appealed directly to the king of Sweden (Gustav IV Adolf), who allowed the construction of a chapel in 1801. The village of Kuukkajärvi became a subordinate parish under Saarijärvi, initially named Minkkilä.

The original vicarage was the Niemelä farm, which was deemed unsuitable in 1816 and was exchanged for Marjoniemi, between the lakes Akko and Sääkspää. In 1829, the section of Kuukkajärvi that was part of Laukaa, including the vicarage, became a separate village under the name Uurainen. While still part of Saarijärvi, the parish was variously known as Kuukkajärvi or Kuukka after the village the church was in, Minkkilä after the farm on whose lands it was built, or Uurainen after the location of the vicarage; Uurainen became the sole name when the parish became independent. Officially, it was separated from Saarijärvi in 1868, but this did not take effect until 1887. Municipal administration was adopted in 1868.

The village began to take its modern shape in the late 19th century, as houses and stores were built along the old highway (now called Kuukantie), where most services are still located today. Starting in the 1960s, many old wooden detached houses were replaced with brick houses and prefabricated houses, while row houses began to be built in the 1970s. The first apartment building was completed in 1960. A zoning plan for Uuraisten kirkonkylä was made in 1983.

== Services ==
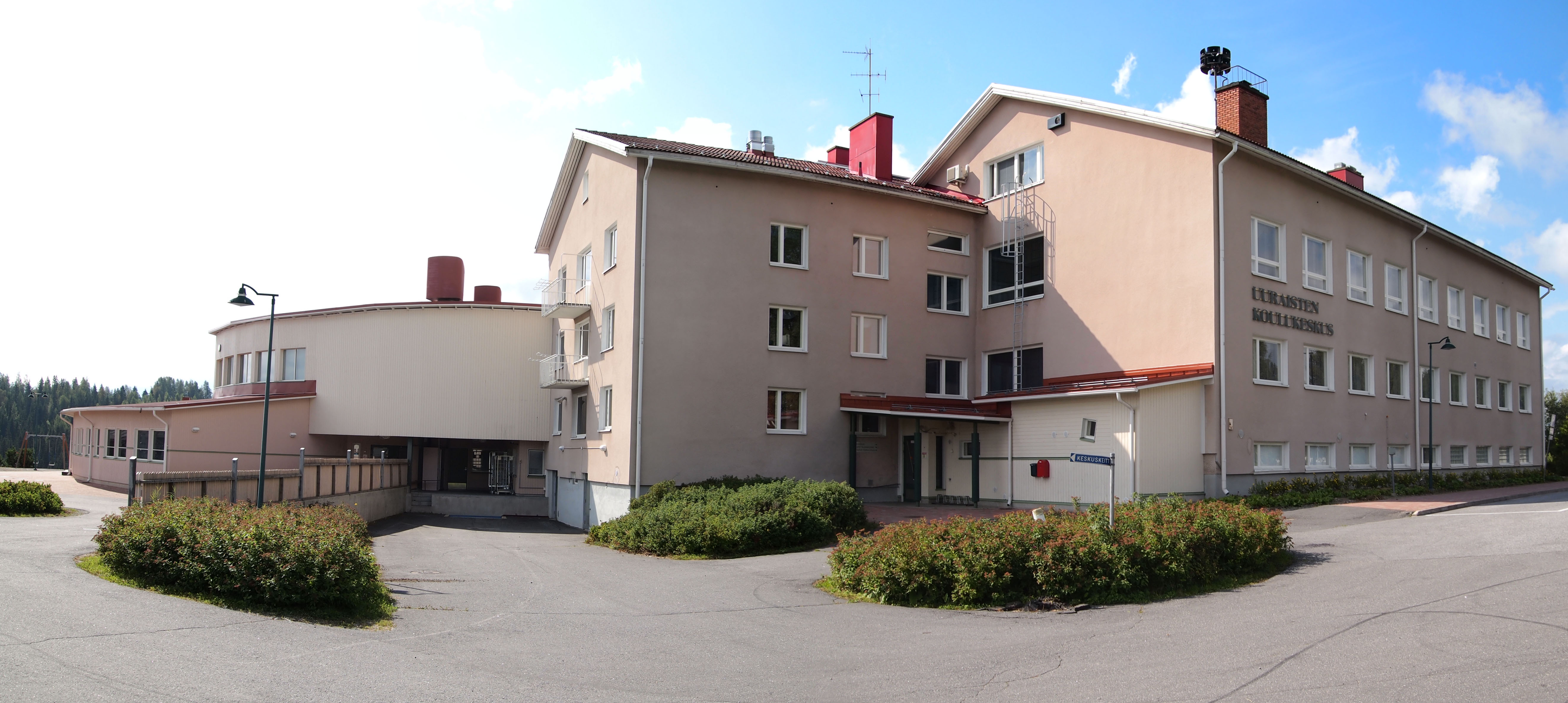
Uuraisten koulukeskus in 2012

There is a school for all grades (1–9) of peruskoulu in Uuraisten kirkonkylä, with 332 students as of 2025. It is the only school in the municipality with education for grades 7–9. The school was established in 1889 and its current main building dates to 1955. The building was expanded and renovated in 2004.

Other services include a library, a municipal clinic and a nursing home, all located near the school.

== Church ==
The modern Evangelical Lutheran church of Uurainen, a wooden cruciform church, was designed by Yrjö Blomstedt and completed in 1905, replacing the old church (originally a chapel) built in 1803. Its surroundings include a bell tower built by Jaakko Kuorikoski in 1882 and a parish granary from 1860. The church, along with its surroundings, is classified as a cultural heritage site of national significance (valtakunnallisesti merkittävä rakennettu kulttuuriympäristö).

== Notable buildings ==
Regionally significant buildings include the Marjoniemi vicarage, the Minkkilä farm, the Pokela farm with its surroundings, and the People's House (työväentalo).

The original Marjoniemi vicarage was built in 1817. It was destroyed in a fire in 1854, but was rebuilt immediately. The modern building dates to 1888 and was used as a vicarage until 1962, when it was bought by the municipality of Uurainen, who leased it to a metal workshop. From the 1970s until the 1990s, Marjoniemi was a campground operated by the city of Jyväskylä, after which it was sold back to the parish of Uurainen. Marjoniemi became a privately owned venue in 2016. On 12 January 2021, a fire damaged much of the building.

The Minkkilä farm is located on a hill at the northern end of Iso-Kuukka, and the yard includes many buildings from the 19th century. Pokela has a main building dating to the 18th century, and is a well-preserved example of a 19th-century farmyard.

The People's House of Uurainen was originally the house of merchant Erik Savolainen, built in 1865. The workers' association of Uuraisten kirkonkylä was established in 1906 and bought the building in 1909. In 1917, it was relocated to its current site along the road Hakkaraismäentie. During the Finnish Civil War, it was seized by the local White Guard, who used it as a prison camp. It was given back to the workers' association in 1919. A dance hall named Kasino was built on the lot in 1956, followed by an outdoor restaurant in 1957. The main building was renovated in the 1970s and 1980s.
