= Kyynämöinen =

- Village
- Location in Central Finland Kyynämöinen (Finland)
- Coordinates: 62.484°N 25.307°E
- Country: Finland
- Region: Central Finland
- Sub-region: Jyväskylä sub-region
- Municipality: Uurainen
- Time zone: UTC+2 (EET)
  - Summer (DST): UTC+3 (EEST)

Kyynämöinen is a village in Uurainen, Finland, located in the western part of the municipality on the shores of the eponymous lake Kyynämöinen and along the highway 627. The distance to the municipal center Uuraisten kirkonkylä is about 8 kilometers (5.0 mi).

The first farm in Kyynämöinen and all of Uurainen was established around 1548. The population of the village started growing in the 1750s, as new farms were established due to the Great Partition. In the 19th century, new settlements such as Haukimäki and Kelloperä emerged near the old village.

== Geography ==
Kyynämöinen is located in the western part of Uurainen, on the shores of the eponymous lake Kyynämöinen and along the highway 627 leading to Multia. The distance to the municipal center Uuraisten kirkonkylä is about 8 km (5.0 mi), while that to Multian kirkonkylä (central Multia) is 31 km (19 mi) and that to the regional center Jyväskylä is 42 km (26 mi). Kyynämöinen is closely tied to four nearby settlements: Kotaperä and Korvenranta also along the road to Multia, Kelloperä on a smaller road branching from it, and Haukimäki along the road to the village of Pajupuro in Saarijärvi. The five settlements have a combined population of about 400 as of 2025.

The center of Kyynämöinen is classified as a regionally significant landscape area, also including the conservation area of the Kuoliosaaret islands of lake Kyynämöinen. The two islands are connected by a narrow isthmus. The bigger island, Iso-Kuoliosaari, is a historical burial place, while the smaller Pieni-Kuoliosaari likely only emerged in the 19th century after the lake's surface was artificially lowered.

== History ==
Kyynämöinen was historically a section of the village of Kuukkajärvi, the first farm of which was Salmela, established around 1548 by Paavo Minkkinen on the territory of modern Kyynämöinen. Salmela was also the first known farm in all of Uurainen. Already since the 16th century, Kuukkajärvi had been subdivided into three parts (for land partition; jakokunta), with Kyynämöinen comprising the area west of the lakes Sääkspää and Tehlo, including Salmela, Piesala, Keljo, Helkala, Pokela and Kuitula. The Piesala and Helkala farms were split from Salmela in 1607, followed by Keljo (known as Minkkilä until the late 18th century) in 1618. Kuitula and Pokela were wholly new farms established in the early 1620s.

The Minkkinen family held Salmela until the 1640s, when its owner Matti Niilonpoika abandoned it. In 1650, it was resettled by Olavi Laurinpoika, probably of the Salminen family. Kuitula, Piesala and Helkala were abandoned during the Great Famine of 1695–1697; however, they were resettled from Saarijärvi and Petäjävesi soon afterwards. The population of Kyynämöinen started to grow in the 1750s, when the Great Partition began in the area and new farms were established. The Korvenranta farm was established in 1858; the parishioners of Uurainen had wished to relocate the vicarage of the parish there, but this was not accepted by the Senate of Finland.

In the 1830s, the Karikonkoski sawmill was established in Petäjävesi, acquiring much of its wood from Kyynämöinen.

The modern center of Kyynämöinen took its shape in the 19th century. Around the same time, new settlements emerged around Kyynämöinen proper, including Kelloperä, Haukimäki or Haukiperä, Linnanperä and Kalteenperä. The settlement of Korvenranta emerged after the Winter and Continuation Wars, mainly comprising farms established by Karelian refugees.

Between 1973 and 1985, a furniture factory operated in Kyynämöinen, with over 40 employees at its peak.

== Services ==
There is a school in Kyynämöinen for grades 1–6 of peruskoulu, with 43 students in the school year of 2025–2026; education for grades 7–9 is provided by the school in the municipal center. It was established in 1899 as the second school in the municipality. A separate school district covering Haukimäki and Kelloperä was established in 1923, but was merged back into the Kyynämöinen district in 1967. The Korvenranta school planned in the 1950s was never established. In 2024, due to the low number of students, the municipality planned to close the Kyynämöinen school by 2025, but this was canceled in December 2024.

The school was accompanied by a library from 1905 until 2013.
