= Lake Saarijärvi =

Lake in Saarijärvi, Finland

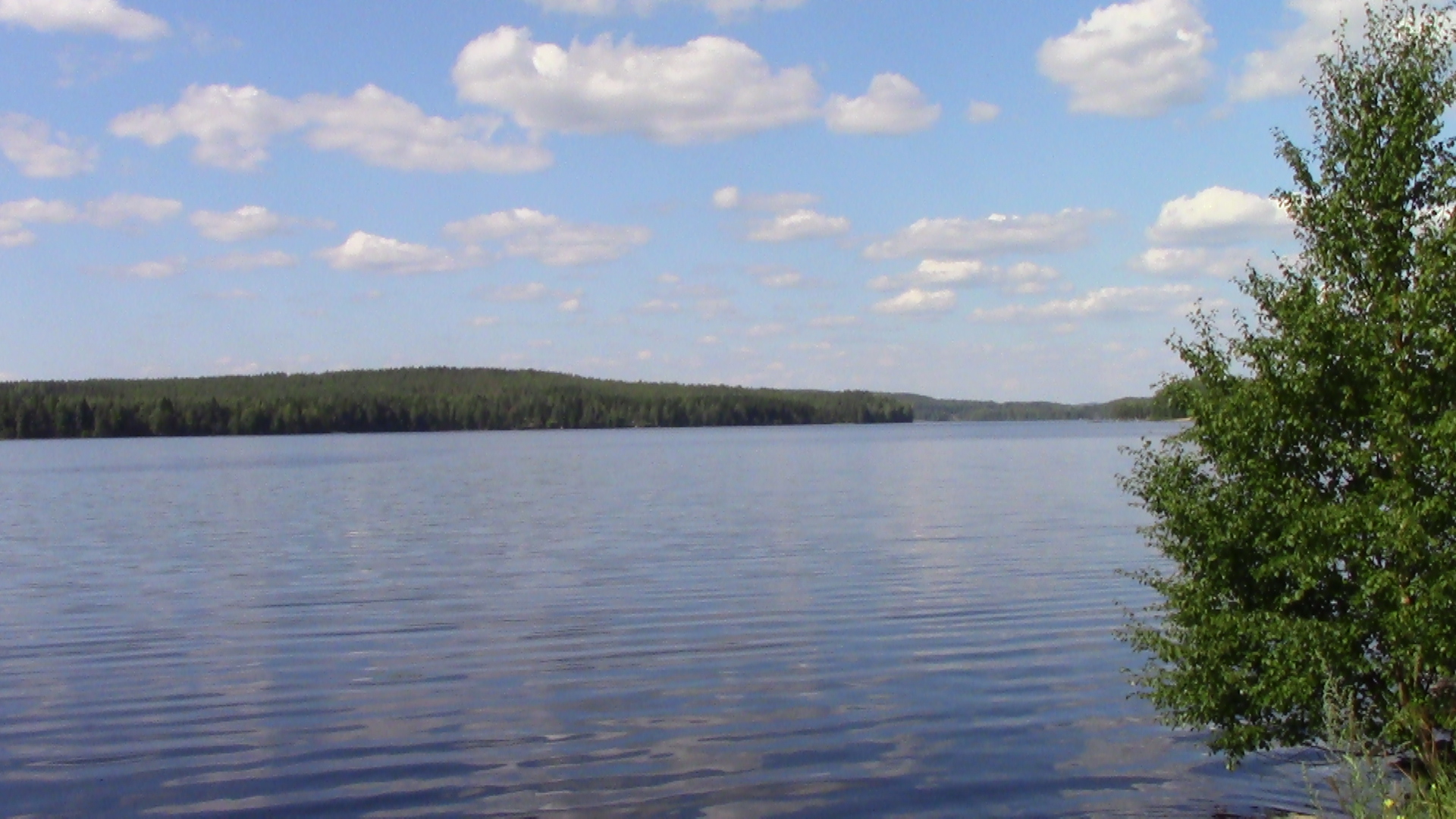
- Lake Saarijärvi

- Location within Finland
- Coordinates: 62°42′N 25°13′E
- Lake type: Natural
- Catchment area: Kymijoki
- Basin countries: Finland
- Surface area: 14.147 km^{2} (5.462 sq mi)
- Average depth: 4.99 m (16.4 ft)
- Max. depth: 24.7 m (81 ft)
- Water volume: 0.0706 km^{3} (0.0169 cu mi)
- Shore length^{1}: 53.99 km (33.55 mi)
- Surface elevation: 117.4 m (385 ft)
- Frozen: December-April
- Islands: Elosaari
- Settlements: Saarijärvi
- ^{1} Shore length is not a well-defined measure.

Lake Saarijärvi is a medium-sized lake in Central Finland. Saarijärvi is a very common name of a lake in Finnish. There are 198 lakes with this name in Finland. The biggest of them is located in Saarijärvi municipality. The municipality is located between two lakes, Saarijärvi and Pyhäjärvi.

== See also ==
- List of lakes in Finland
