= Pyhäjärvi (Saarijärvi) =

Lake in Finland

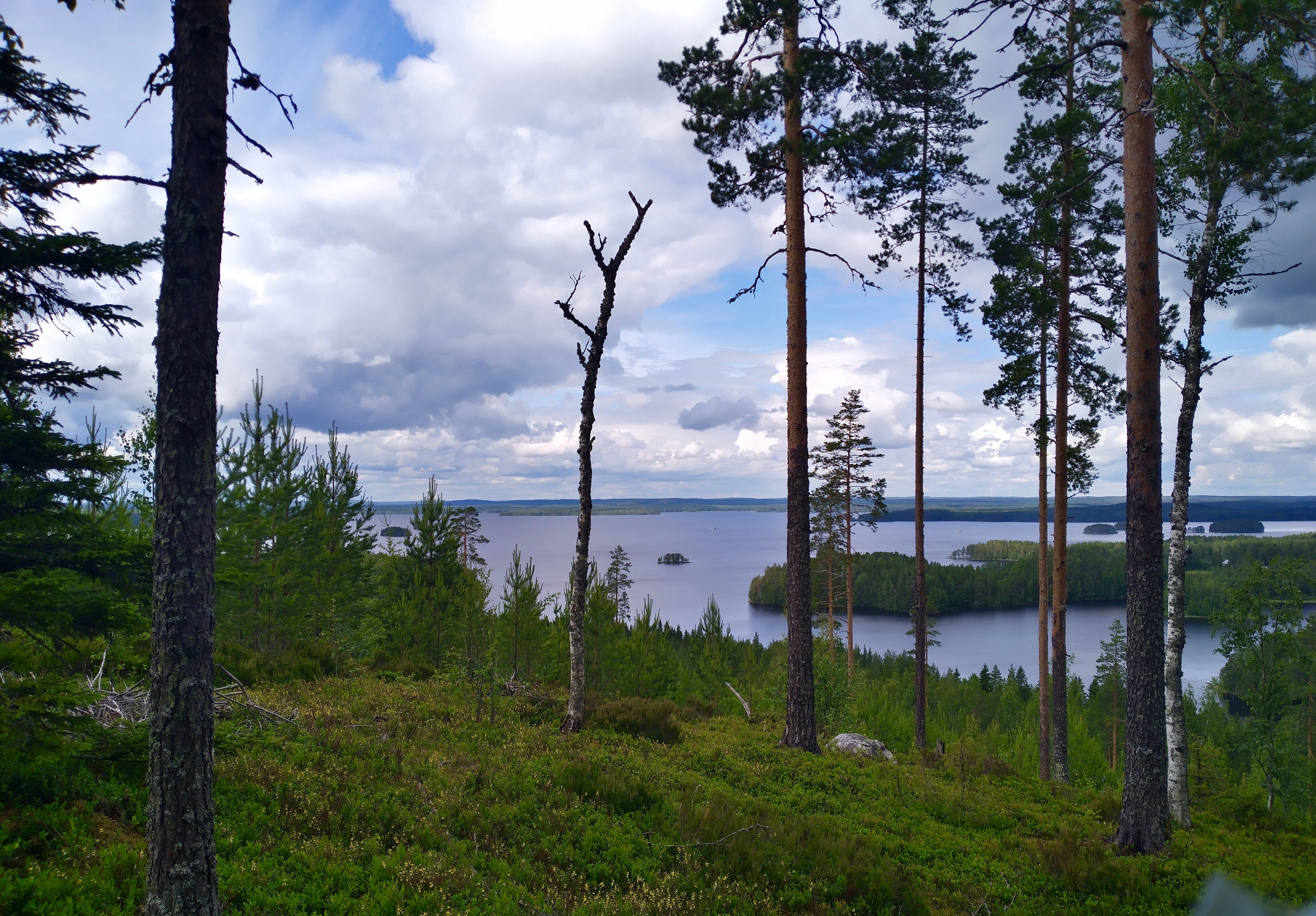
- Pyhäjärvi seen from the Vasavuori hill in Äänekoski.
- Interactive map of Pyhäjärvi
- Coordinates: 62°43′42″N 25°27′18″E
- Lake type: Natural
- Primary outflows: Parantalankoski, Pyhäjoki
- Basin countries: Finland
- Surface area: 58.94 km^{2} (22.76 sq mi)
- Average depth: 9.67 m (31.7 ft)
- Max. depth: 43.2 m (142 ft)
- Water volume: 0.57 km^{3} (0.14 cu mi)
- Shore length^{1}: 183.85 km (114.24 mi)
- Surface elevation: 119.9 m (393 ft)
- Frozen: December-April
- Islands: Salonsaari, Hässössaari, Majasaari, Kurjensaari
- Settlements: Saarijärvi, Äänekoski
- ^{1} Shore length is not a well-defined measure.

Pyhäjärvi is a medium-sized lake of Central Finland, located on the border between the municipalities of Saarijärvi and Äänekoski. It belongs to the Kymijoki main catchment area. Pyhäjärvi (meaning: Holy lake) is a common name for lakes in Finland. There are 39 lakes with the same name.

Pyhäjärvi has two outflows: most of its waters flow into Kiimasjärvi through a hydroelectric plant on the Parantalankoski rapids. The lake's second and original outflow is the river Pyhäjoki, which discharges into Iso-Lumperoinen. Ultimately, all of the lake's waters flow into Kiimasjärvi, as Iso-Lumperoinen discharges into Pieni-Lumperoinen, then to Saarijärvi, Summanen and finally Kiimasjärvi.

== See also ==
- List of lakes in Finland
