= Kain Tapper =

Finnish sculptor

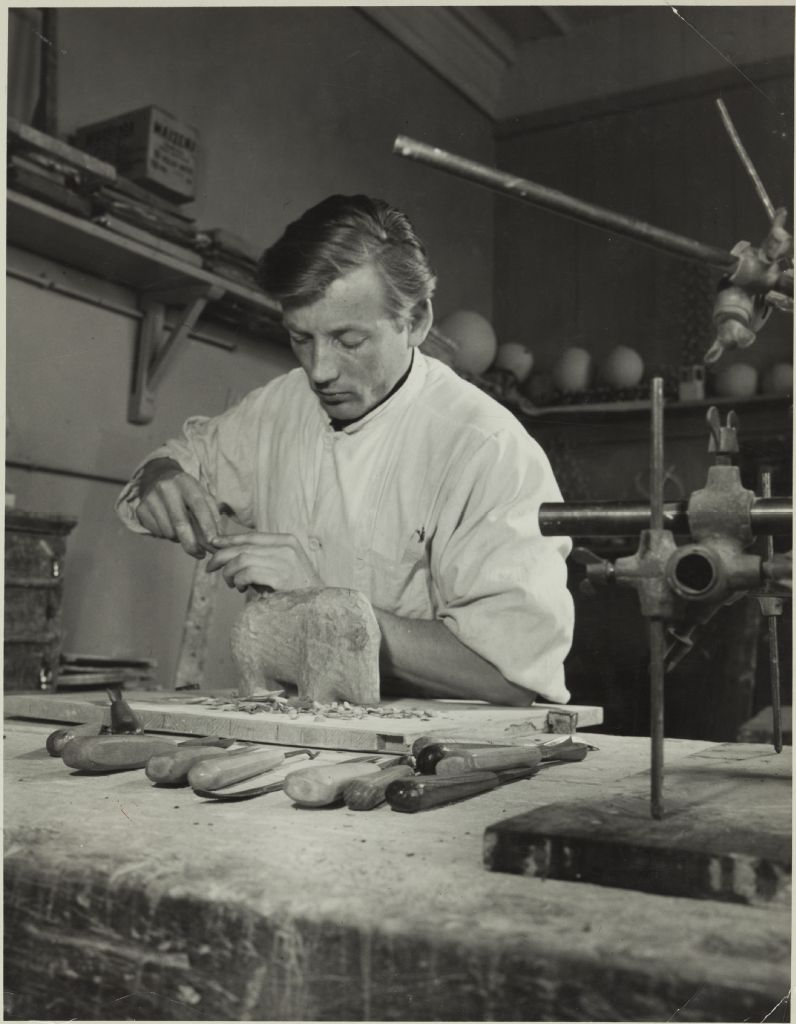
Kain Tapper in the early 1950s.

Kain Tapper (6 June 1930, in Saarijärvi – 17 August 2004) was a Finnish sculptor. He created works that are "remote", evoking things contemplated from a distance. Even when small, his pieces loom like menhirs, their massiveness imposing an inhuman scale. He combined nature and natural phenomena, old folklore and modernism. He epitomised the Informalist style in Finnish sculpture. Tapper created a sculpture of Finnish poet Ilmari Kianto which has been installed near Turja's Castle in Suomussalmi.
