= Uurainen =

- Municipality
- Uuraisten kunta Uurainens kommun
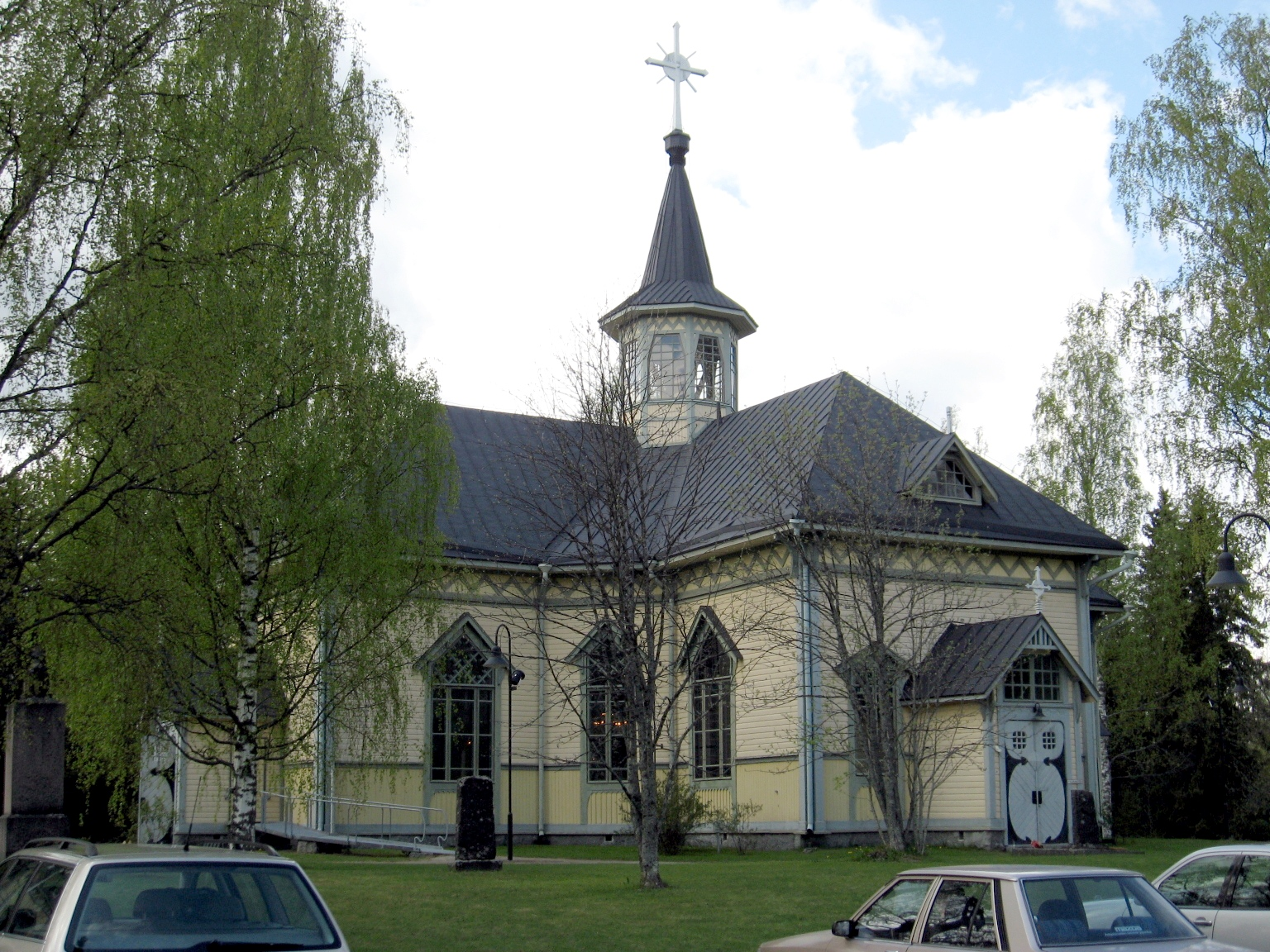
- Uurainen Church

- Coat of arms

- Location of Uurainen in Finland
- Interactive map of Uurainen
- Coordinates: 62°30′N 025°26.2′E
- Country: Finland
- Region: Central Finland
- Sub-region: Jyväskylä
- Charter: 1868
- Seat: Uuraisten kirkonkylä

Government
  - Municipal manager: Juha Valkama

Area (2018-01-01)
  - Total: 372.26 km^{2} (143.73 sq mi)
  - Land: 347.98 km^{2} (134.36 sq mi)
  - Water: 24.22 km^{2} (9.35 sq mi)
  - Rank: 221st largest in Finland

Population (2025-12-31)
  - Total: 3,651
  - Rank: 198th largest in Finland
  - Density: 10.49/km^{2} (27.2/sq mi)

Population by native language
  - Finnish: 98.5% (official)
  - Others: 1.5%

Population by age
  - 0 to 14: 25.3%
  - 15 to 64: 54.5%
  - 65 or older: 20.2%
- Time zone: UTC+02:00 (EET)
  - Summer (DST): UTC+03:00 (EEST)
- Website: uurainen.fi

Uurainen (Swedish: Uurainen, also Urais) is a municipality of Finland.

It is part of the Central Finland region. The municipality has a population of 3,651 (31 December 2025) and covers an area of 372.26 square kilometres (143.73 sq mi) of which 24.22 km^{2} (9.35 sq mi), or roughly 6.5%, is water. The population density is 10.49 inhabitants per square kilometre (27.2/sq mi).

Neighbouring municipalities are Jyväskylä, Laukaa, Multia, Petäjävesi, Saarijärvi and Äänekoski.

The municipality is unilingually Finnish.

== Etymology ==
The name of Uurainen was first mentioned in 1741 as Uhrais. The municipality was named after the village of Uurainen, in turn named after the lakes Iso-Uurainen and Vähä-Uurainen. Their names may be related to the word uuro meaning 'riverbed', in this context referring to the stream between the two, which may have been a strait in the past.

Before becoming an independent parish, Uurainen was also known as Kuukkajärvi, Kuukka and Minkkilä after the location of the church, the first two names to the village itself and the last to the farm on whose lands the church was built. The name Uurainen in turn refers to the site of the vicarage.

== Geography ==
=== Nature ===
The terrain of Uurainen is hilly, with the highest point being Kukkamäki at an elevation of 268 metres (879 ft) above sea level. Granite is the most common bedrock in Uurainen, exposed in various outcrops. Peatlands make up about one-fourth of the municipality's area, with some major ones including Hankasuo, Kuitulan Isosuo, Matosuo, Miehinkäisensuo and Oksalan Isosuo.

There are all together 125 lakes in Uurainen. The biggest lakes are Kyynämöinen, Sääkspää and Iso-Uurainen. Other notable lakes include Akko, Iso-Kuukka, Pieni-Uurainen, Pikku-Kuukka and Tehlo. The southernmost part of Lannevesi is also part of Uurainen; most of the municipality's lakes flow into it via the river Isojoki.

=== Population ===
As of 31 December 2023, there were 3,615 people living in Uurainen, of whom 1,665 lived in urban areas (taajama), 1,910 lived outside them and 40 lived in an unknown location. There were three urban areas in the municipality: Uuraisten kirkonkylä (administrative centre, 1,027), Hirvaskangas (469) and Pieni-Hirvanen (169). Hirvaskangas and Pieni-Hirvanen also extend into Äänekoski.

The following villages have or have had their own school district:

- Haukimäki
- Hepomäki
- Hirvaskylä (Hirvanen)
- Höytiä
- Jokihaara
- Kangashäkki
- Kotaperä
- Kummunkylä (Pirttimäki)
- Kyynämöinen
- Tehlo
- Uuraisten kirkonkylä

Other settlements include e.g. Linnanperä, Pohjanperä, Kelloperä, Hiirola, Vihtaperä, Oikarinperä, Murtoperä, Pirttiperä, Myllyperä and Sälliperä. There are five historical land register villages, distinct from modern definitions of villages, in Uurainen: Höytiä, Kangashäkki, Kuukkajärvi, Nyrölä and Uurainen.

== History ==
Six possible Stone Age settlements have been found on the territory of modern Uurainen. Four of these sites are in Kuukkajärvi, one in the village of Uurainen and another in Höytiä. Evidence of permanent Iron Age or medieval settlement has not been found.

Until the 16th century, the area of Uurainen was owned as hunting grounds by land-owning farmers from the heartlands of historical Häme, e.g. Kulsiala and Hauho. The first farm in modern Uurainen was Salmela, established in Kuukkajärvi around 1548 by Paavo Minkkinen of Savonian origin, likely from the Mikkeli area. In 1561, Kuukkajärvi was mentioned alongside a village named Akonjärvi, which was merged into the former in 1586. The area of Uurainen was originally part of the Rautalampi parish, from which Laukaa was separated in 1593. In 1628, the Saarijärvi parish was separated from Laukaa. As Saarijärvi became an independent parish, Kuukkajärvi was split between it and Laukaa, as two farms in the village remained part of Laukaa.

As the churches in both Saarijärvi and Laukaa were hard to reach from Kuukkajärvi, villagers on both sides requested permission from the governor of the Vaasa Province to build their own church in 1787. However, this was opposed by parishioners from Saarijärvi proper, as it would have reduced the number of people able to renovate the parish's main church when needed. Some people from contemporary Keuruu had initially also offered to join the new parish, but not later on. The villagers of Kuukkajärvi made a second attempt when bishop Zacharias Cygnaeus visited Saarijärvi in 1794, which he declined, stating that the villagers could not provide the required salary for a priest.

The construction of a chapel in Kuukkajärvi was eventually allowed by King Gustav IV Adolf in 1801, and Kuukkajärvi became a subordinate parish under Saarijärvi. The original vicarage was also on the side of Kuukkajärvi belonging to Saarijärvi, but was exchanged for an estate on the side of Laukaa in 1816. In 1829, the part of Kuukkajärvi within the Laukaa parish was separated into the village of Uurainen, which gave the parish its later name. In 1856, the chapel became a proper church and the parish was expanded to include 12 farms from Soukkajärvi and three farms from Kangashäkki. The first attempt to make Uurainen a fully independent parish was made in 1863, but was declined by the Senate of Finland in 1866. A second proposal was made soon after and Uurainen became an independent parish on 10 February 1868, coming into effect after the death of parish priest Karl Stenius in 1887.

In the 1920s, during a period of population growth, there were plans to establish a municipality called Niinivesi from the eastern parts of Uurainen and western parts of Äänekoski (i.e. Äänekosken maalaiskunta). In the 1960s, as a result of population decline caused by rural flight, various changes to the municipal borders were proposed. One proposal suggested that Tikkakoski, as well as possibly Lannevesi and parts of Multia, be transferred to Uurainen, while another would have abolished the municipality and merged it into Jyväskylän maalaiskunta. In 1968, some people from Kangashäkki also wished to join Äänekoski. Ultimately, none of the proposals were accepted.

== Gallery ==
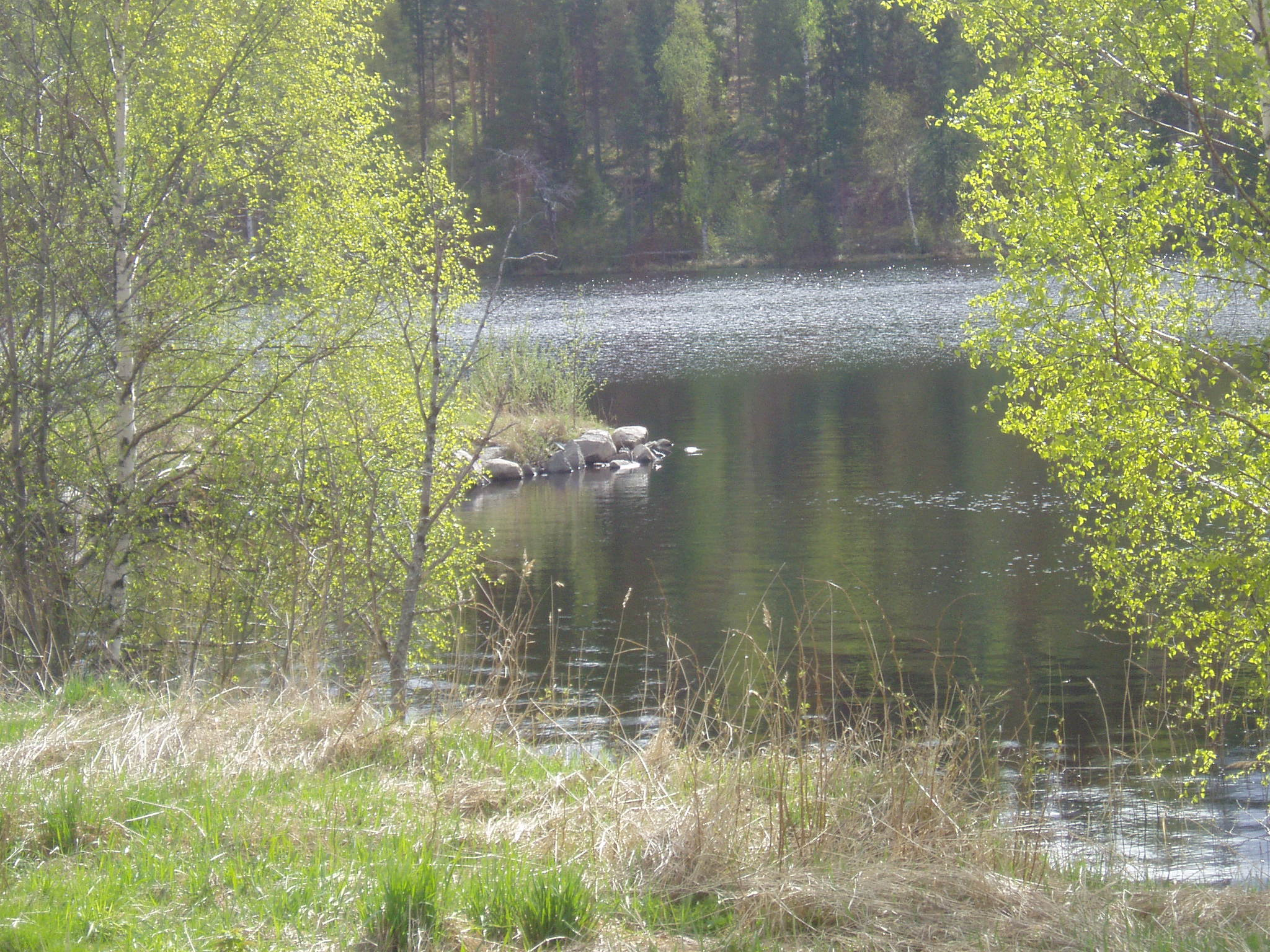
Lake Kuorejärvi

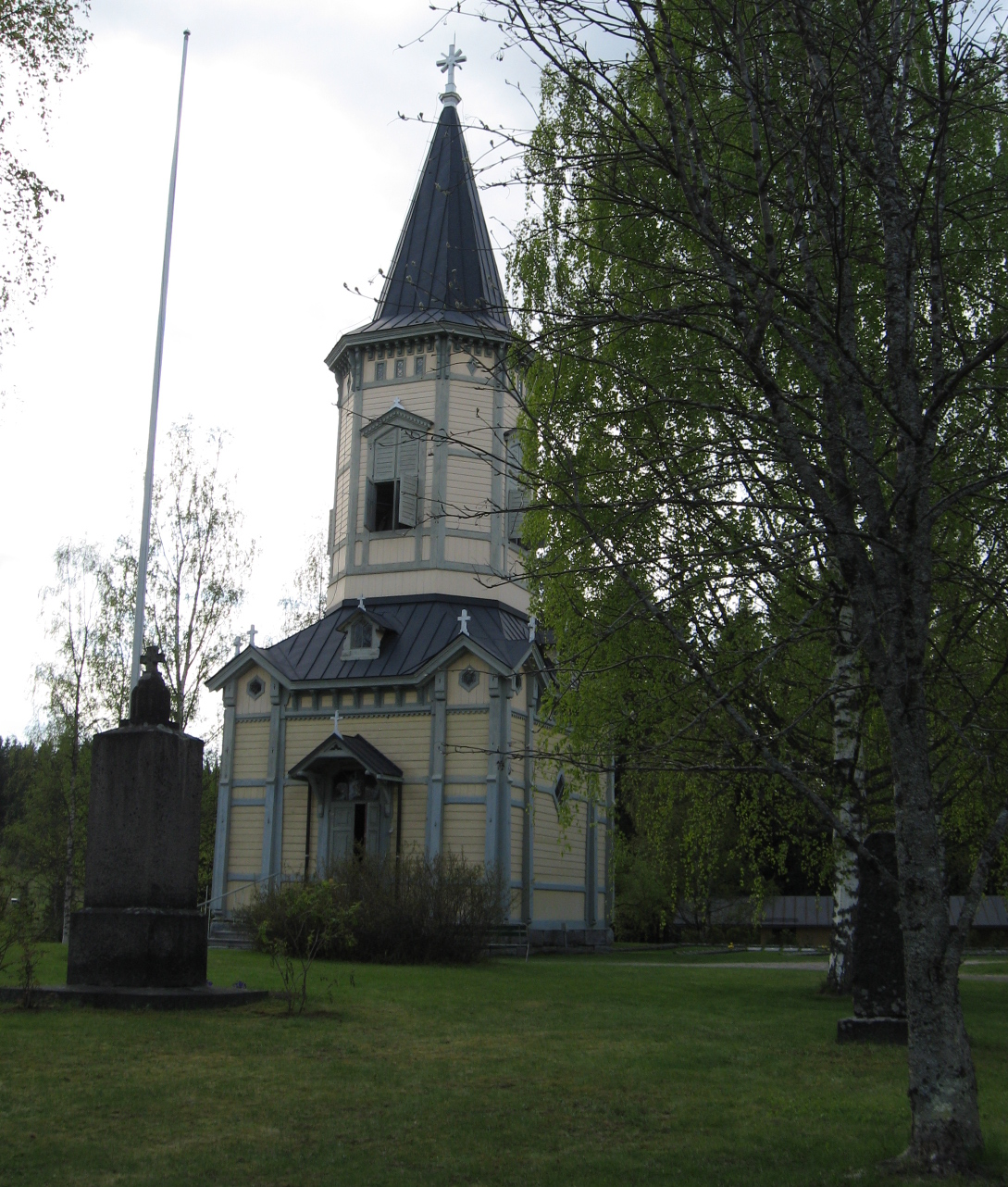
The belfry of the Uurainen Church
