= Pylkönmäki =

- Former municipality
- Pylkönmäen kunta Pylkönmäki kommun
- Coat of arms

- Location of Pylkönmäki in Finland
- Coordinates: 62°40′05″N 24°48′20″E
- Country: Finland
- Province: Western Finland Province
- Region: Central Finland
- Established: 1914
- Merged into Saarijärvi: 2009
- Seat: Pylkönmäen kirkonkylä

Area
  - Land: 366.83 km^{2} (141.63 sq mi)

Population (2008-12-31)
  - Total: 975

Pylkönmäki is a former municipality of Finland. It was consolidated to Saarijärvi on 1 January 2009.

It is located in the Central Finland region. The municipality had a population of 975 (2006) and covered an area of 392.61 km^{2} of which 24.58 km^{2} is water. The population density was 2.65 inhabitants per km^{2}.

The municipality was unilingually Finnish.

== Villages ==
- Pylkönmäen kirkonkylä
- Kukko
- Kuoppala
- Mahlu
- Paajala
- Puolimatka
- Mulikka
- Pajumäki
- Soidinmäki
- Vihanti
- Pääjärvi

== History ==
Pylkönmäki was first mentioned in 1788, at the time referring to a farm in the village of Paajala. It is named after Antti Pylkkänen (or Pylkkinen), who moved from Tavastia into the Karanka wilderness, where the village of Paajala would later appear.

The area was originally a part of Saarijärvi. In 1858 its inhabitants requested the establishment of a chapel in the settlement of Pylkönmäki, which is located between the villages of Paajala and Kukko. The Finnish senate decided that Pylkönmäki should become a separate parish and municipality in 1898, but the change only happened later in 1914.
