= Summanen =

Summanen is a Finnish surname. Notable people with the surname include:

- Eveliina Summanen, Finnish footballer
- Petteri Summanen, Finnish actor
- Raimo Summanen, Finnish ice hockey player
- Seth Everman (born Set Erik Adrian Summanen), Swedish musician and YouTuber, of some Finnish descent
- Teemu Summanen, Finnish Nordic combined skier

== See also ==
- Lake Summanen or Summasjärvi, impact crater lake in Saarijärvi, Finland
