= Saarijärvi =

- Town
- Saarijärven kaupunki Saarijärvi stad
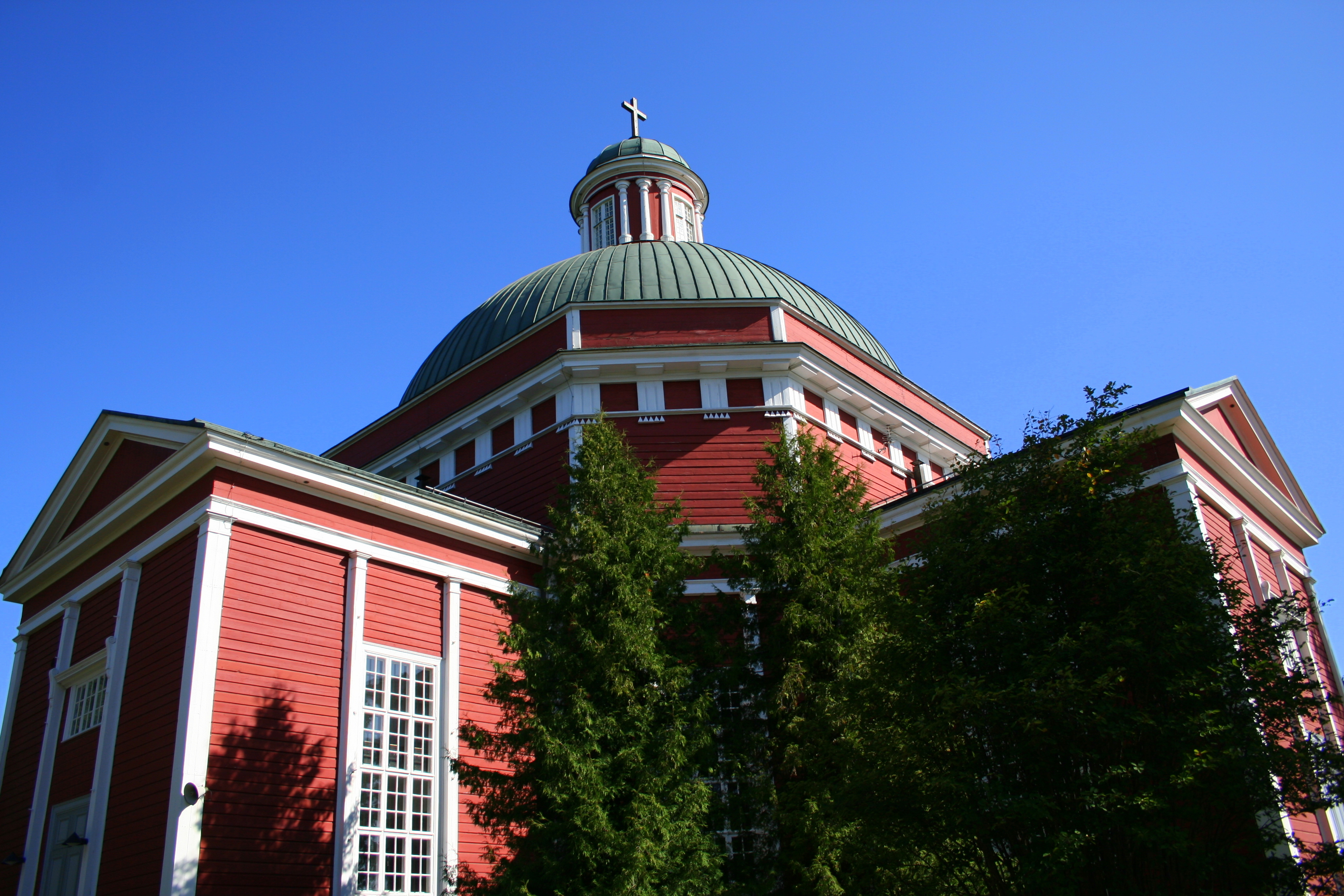
- Church of Saarijärvi

- Flag Coat of arms

- Location of Saarijärvi in Finland
- Interactive map of Saarijärvi
- Coordinates: 62°42.3′N 025°15.5′E
- Country: Finland
- Region: Central Finland
- Sub-region: Saarijärvi-Viitasaari sub-region
- Charter: 1866
- City rights: 1986

Government
  - Town manager: Satu Autiosalo

Area (2018-01-01)
  - Total: 1,422.72 km^{2} (549.32 sq mi)
  - Land: 1,251.76 km^{2} (483.31 sq mi)
  - Water: 170.8 km^{2} (65.9 sq mi)
  - Rank: 58th largest in Finland

Population (2025-12-31)
  - Total: 8,763
  - Rank: 111th largest in Finland
  - Density: 7/km^{2} (18/sq mi)

Population by native language
  - Finnish: 97% (official)
  - Swedish: 0.1%
  - Others: 2.8%

Population by age
  - 0 to 14: 13.8%
  - 15 to 64: 53.2%
  - 65 or older: 33%
- Time zone: UTC+02:00 (EET)
  - Summer (DST): UTC+03:00 (EEST)
- Website: saarijarvi.fi

Saarijärvi (Finnish pronunciation: [ˈsɑːriˌjærʋi]) is a town and municipality of Finland located in the Central Finland region, located about 65 kilometres (40 mi) north of Jyväskylä. The municipality has a population of 8,763, as of 31 December 2025, and covers an area of 1,422.72 square kilometres (549.32 sq mi) of which 170.8 km^{2} (65.9 sq mi), or 12%, is water. The population density is 7 inhabitants per square kilometre (18/sq mi).

Neighbouring municipalities are Kannonkoski, Karstula, Multia, Soini, Uurainen, Ähtäri and Äänekoski. The municipality is unilingually Finnish. The neighboring municipality of Pylkönmäki was merged with the Saarijärvi municipality on 1 January 2009. There are 241 lakes in Saarijärvi altogether. The biggest lakes are Pyhäjärvi, Summanen and Lake Saarijärvi.

Saarijärvi is the home of the peasant Bonden Paavo (Finnish: Saarijärven Paavo), who persists through hardship and adversity, in the poem by Johan Ludvig Runeberg. Juho Hyytiäinen, the great grandfather of Pamela Anderson, left the village in 1908, emigrating to the American continent.

In the 1980s, the traditional parish dishes of Saarijärvi were suutarinpaisti ("cobbler's roast") made by vendace and mashed potatoes called perupuuro, rutabaga-made porridge with lingonberries preserved in water, and charred fish.

== History ==
Saarijärvi has existed since the mid-16th century, when it was a part of the Rautalampi parish. Saarijärvi acquired its first church in 1628, which was also when the Laukaa parish, including Saarijärvi, was separated from Rautalampi. Saarijärvi became a separate parish in 1639 as Palvasalmi. At the time, the parish also included Karstula, Kyyjärvi, Pylkönmäki and a part of Konginkangas. The parish was renamed to Saarijärvi sometime after 1690.

Karstula, including Kyyjärvi, was separated in 1887, Konginkangas in 1895 (partially from Viitasaari) and Pylkönmäki in 1914. Saarijärvi became a town in 1986. Pylkönmäki rejoined Saarijärvi in 2009.

== Twin towns and sister cities ==
Saarijärvi is twinned with:

- Gran, Norway
- Kungsbacka, Sweden
- Trittau (Amt), Germany

== Transport ==
Saarijärvi is served by OnniBus.com route Helsinki—Jyväskylä—Kokkola.

== People born in Saarijärvi ==
- Matthias Calonius (1738 – 1817)
- Samuli Häkkinen (1857 – 1918)
- Otto Stenroth (1861 – 1939)
- Adiel Paananen (1897 – 1968)
- Tarmo Manni (1921 – 1999)
- Toivo Hyytiäinen (1925 – 1978)
- Kain Tapper (1930 – 2004)
- Jarkko Nikara (born 1986)
- Jussi Karvinen (born 1984)

== See also ==
- Finnish national road 58
