= Jyväskylä sub-region =

Jyväskylä sub-region Jyväskylän seutukunta
- Sub-region
- Coordinates: 62°14.5′N 025°44.5′E
- Country: Finland
- Region: Central Finland
- Capital: Jyväskylä

Population
  - Total: 193,254
- Time zone: UTC+2 (EET)
  - Summer (DST): UTC+3 (EEST)
- Website: http://www.jyvaskylanseutu.fi (in Finnish)

Jyväskylä sub-region is a subdivision of Central Finland and one of the sub-regions of Finland since 2009. It covers the area around the city of Jyväskylä. The Jyväskylä region has a population of 193,254, making it the sixth largest region in Finland after Helsinki, Tampere, Turku, Oulu and Lahti.

== Municipalities ==
Coat of arms	Municipality	Population	Land area (km^{2})	Density (/km^{2})	Finnish speakers	Swedish speakers	Other speakers
coat of arms of Hankasalmi	Hankasalmi	4,436	572	8	97 %	0.2 %	3 %
coat of arms of Jyväskylä	Jyväskylä	149,895	1,171	128	92 %	0.2 %	8 %
Coat of arms of Laukaa	Laukaa	18,808	649	29	97 %	0.1 %	2 %
Coat of arms of Muurame	Muurame	10,646	144	74	98 %	0.2 %	2 %
Coat of arms of Petäjävesi	Petäjävesi	3,511	456	8	98 %	0 %	2 %
Coat of arms of Toivakka	Toivakka	2,307	361	6	98 %	0 %	2 %
Coat of arms of Uurainen	Uurainen	3,651	348	10	98 %	0 %	2 %
	Total	193,254	3,701	52	93 %	0.2 %	7 %

== Gallery ==
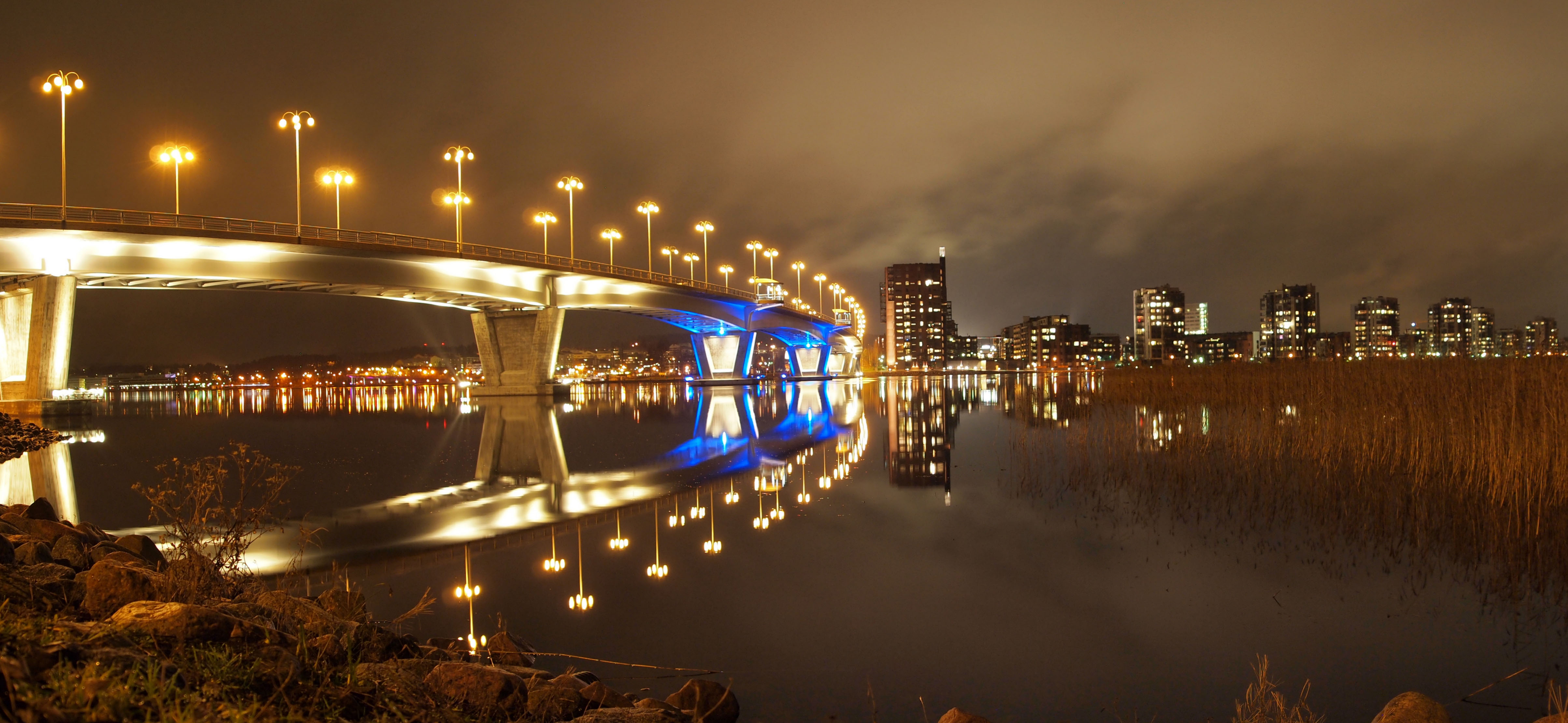
Kuokkala Bridge in Jyväskylä.

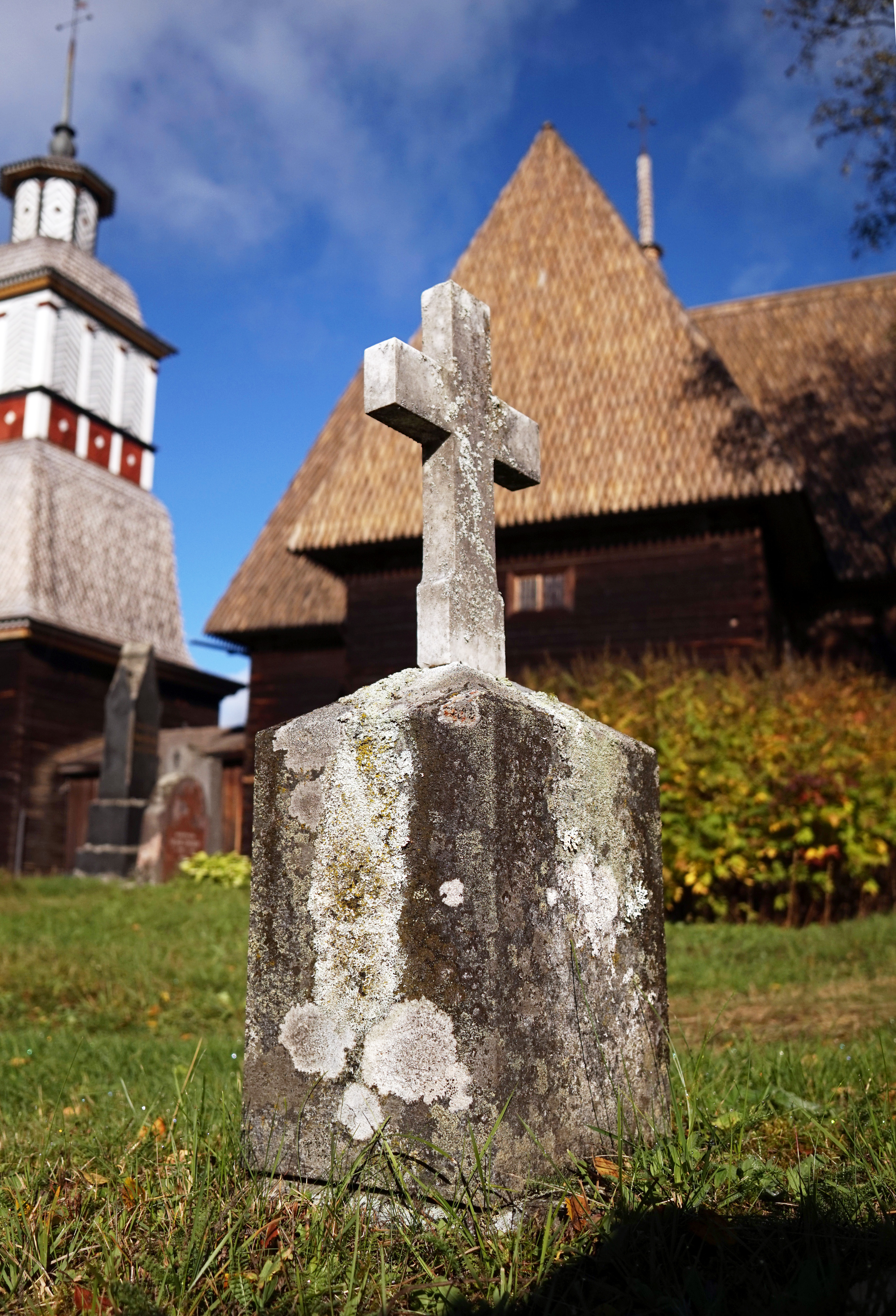
The Petäjävesi Old Church was inscribed in 1994 on the UNESCO World Heritage List.

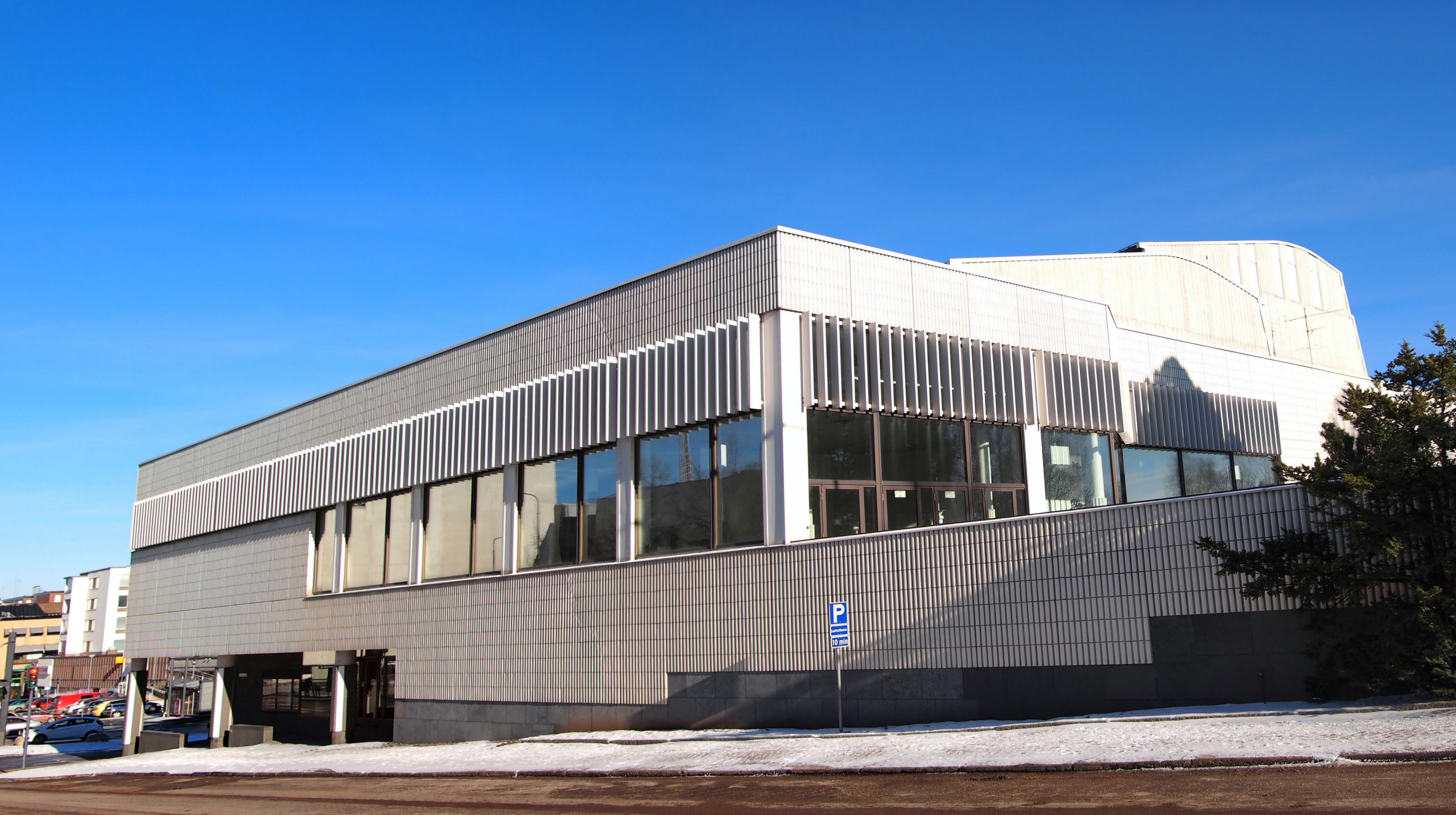
Jyväskylä City Theatre was designed by Alvar Aalto.

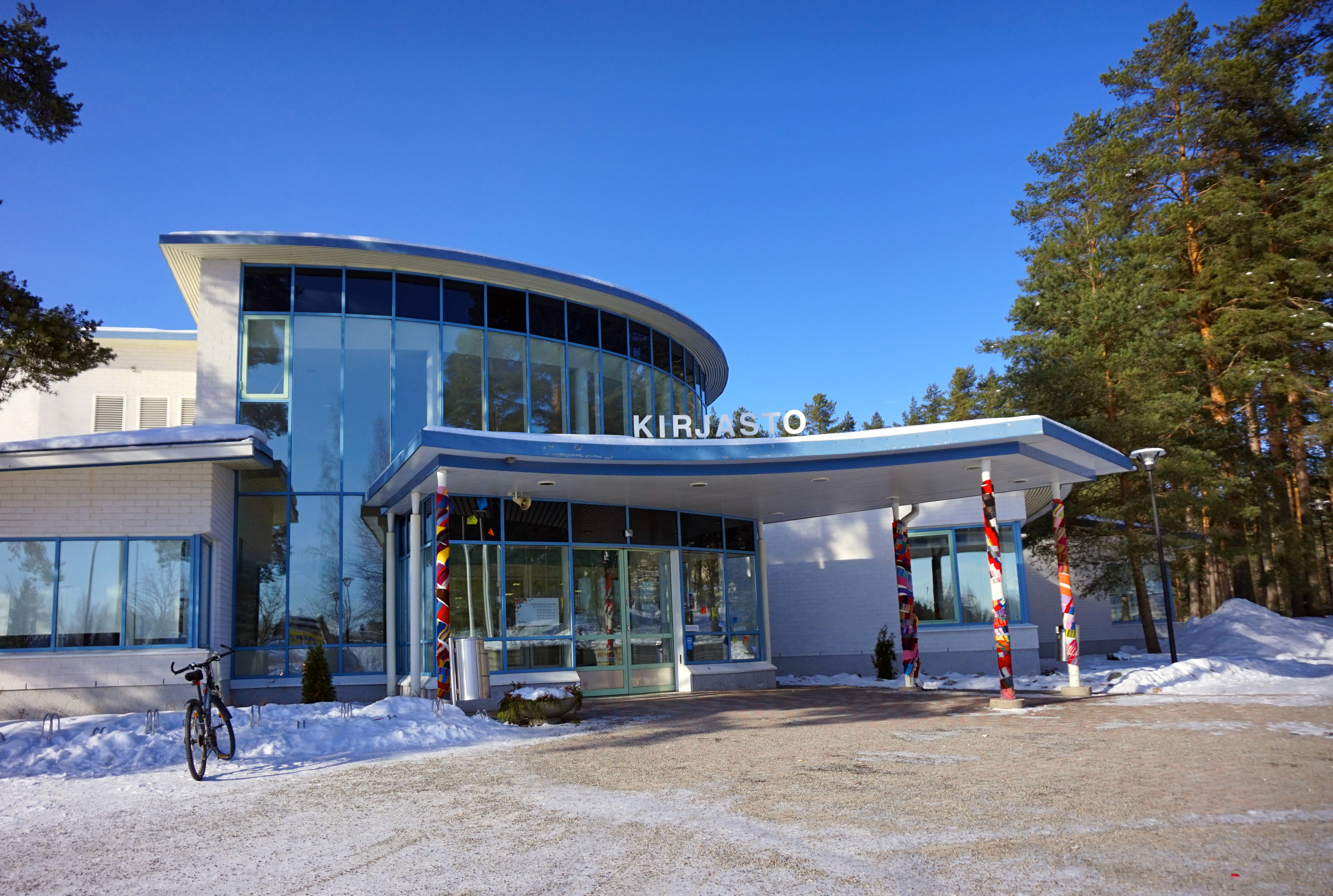
The main library of Laukaa

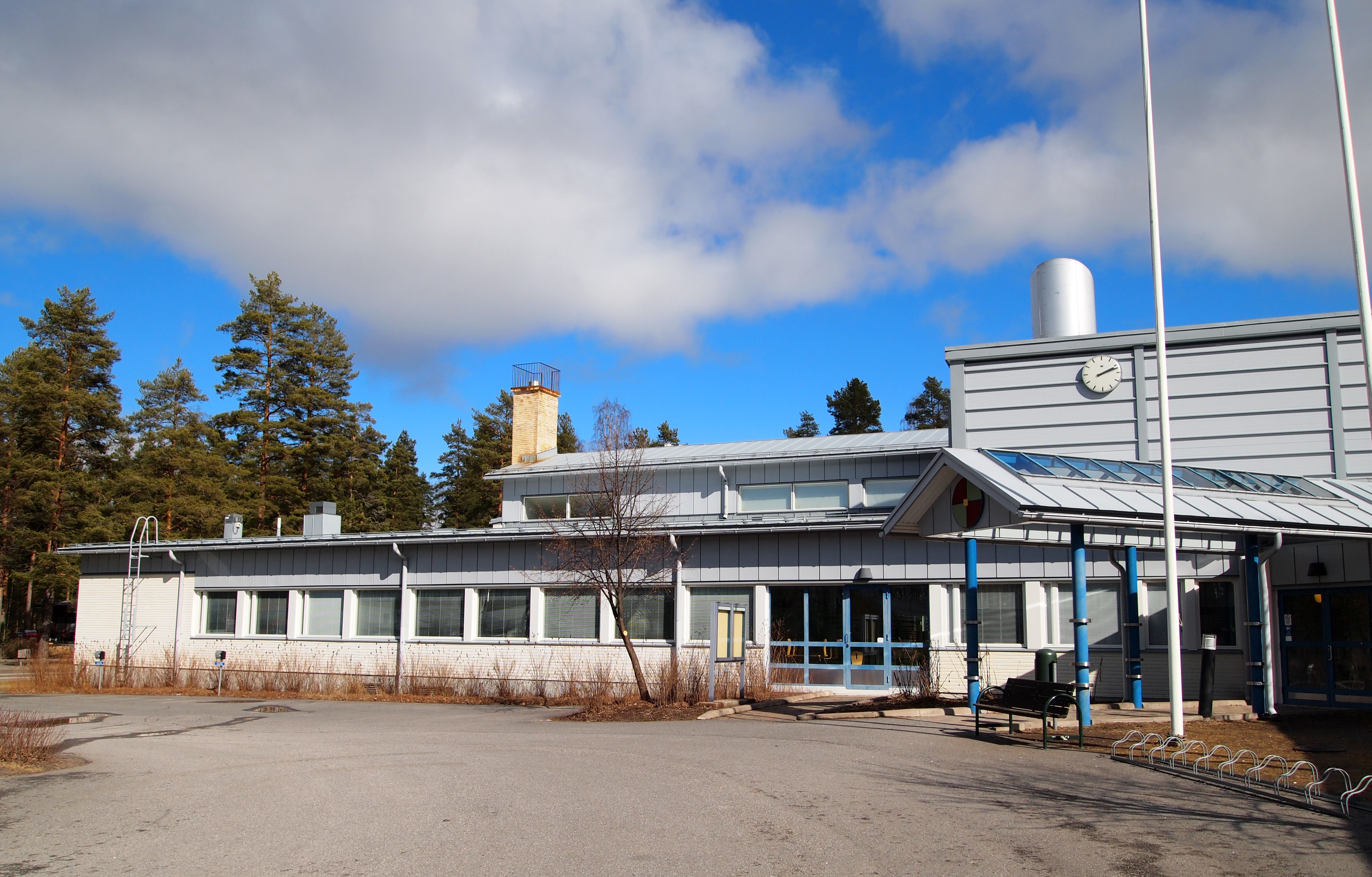
Toivakka school

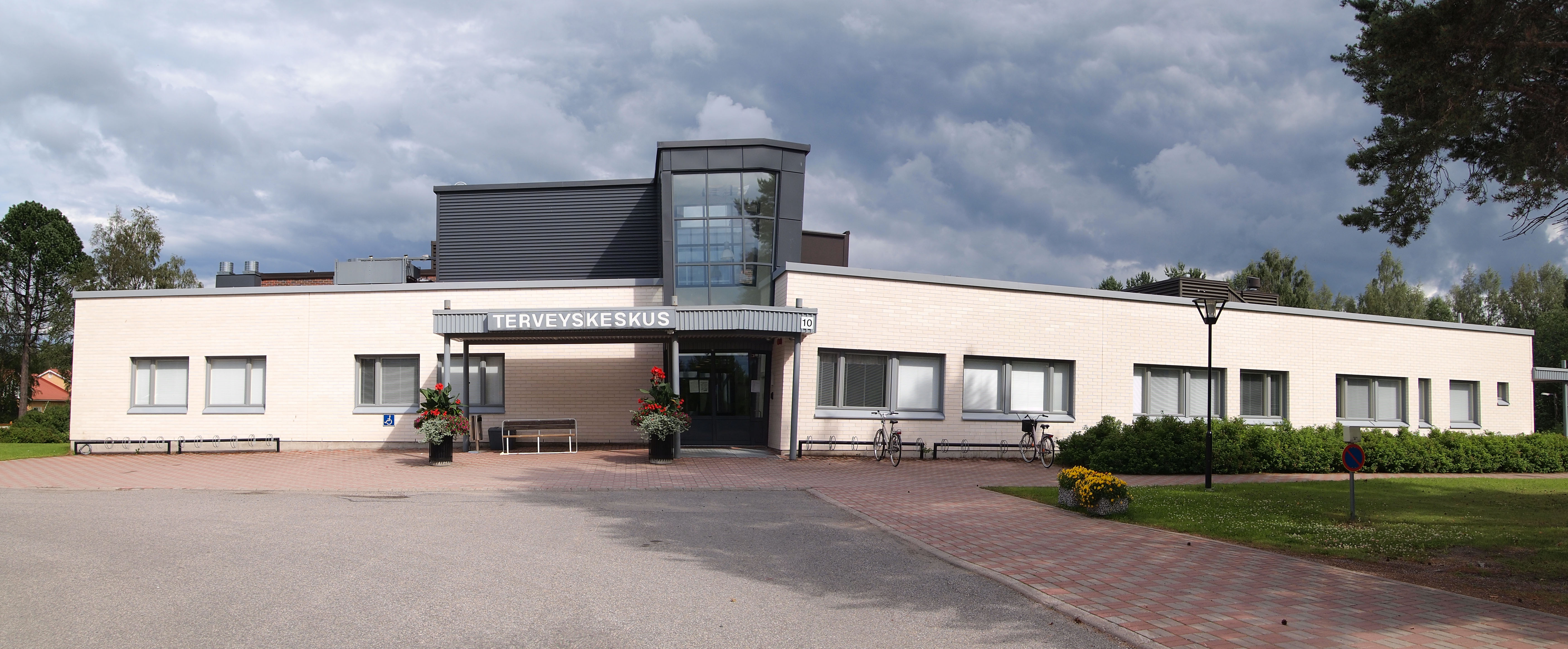
Muurame health centre

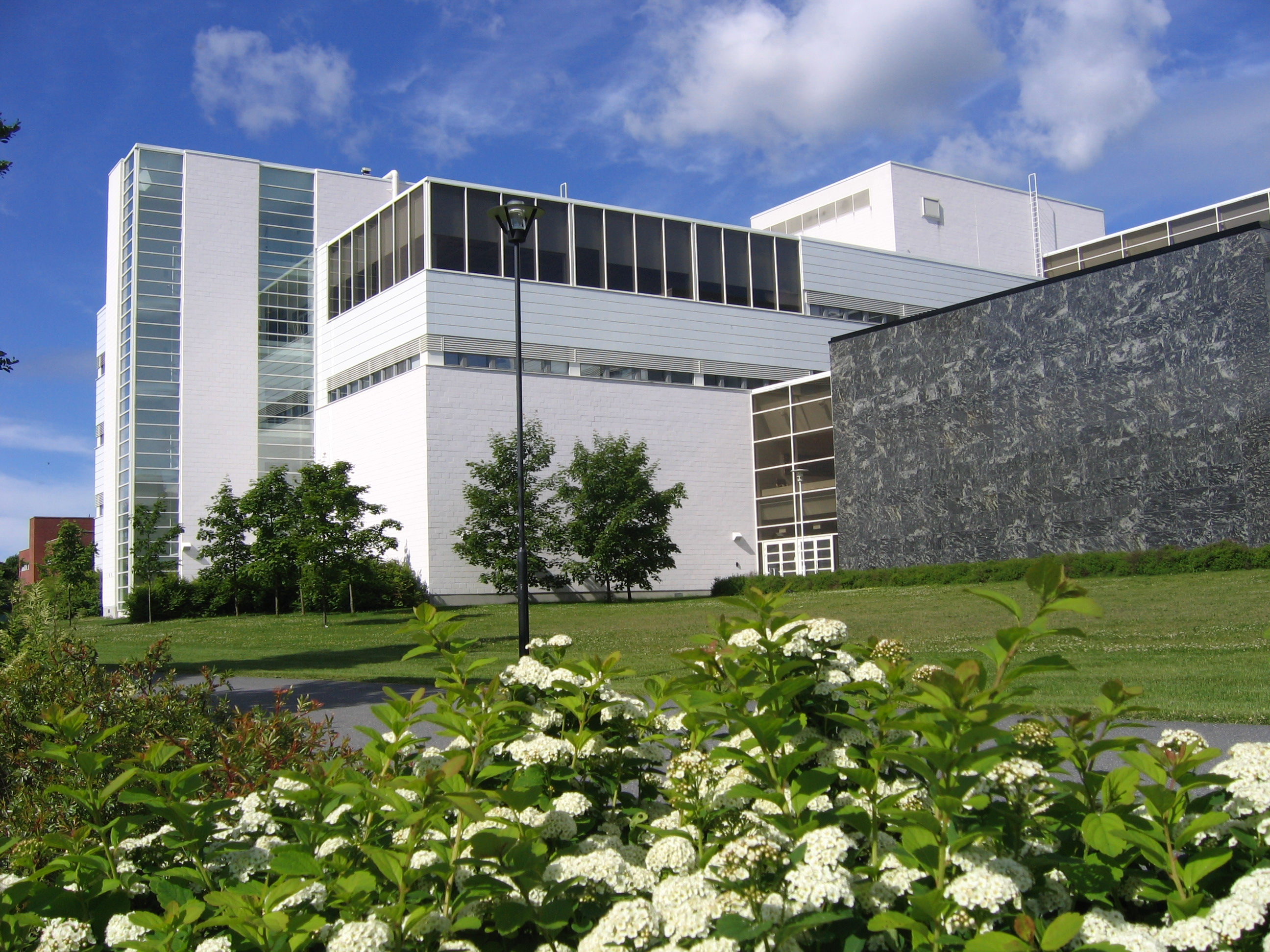
Agora Center is a workplace for teachers, scientists and IT workers.

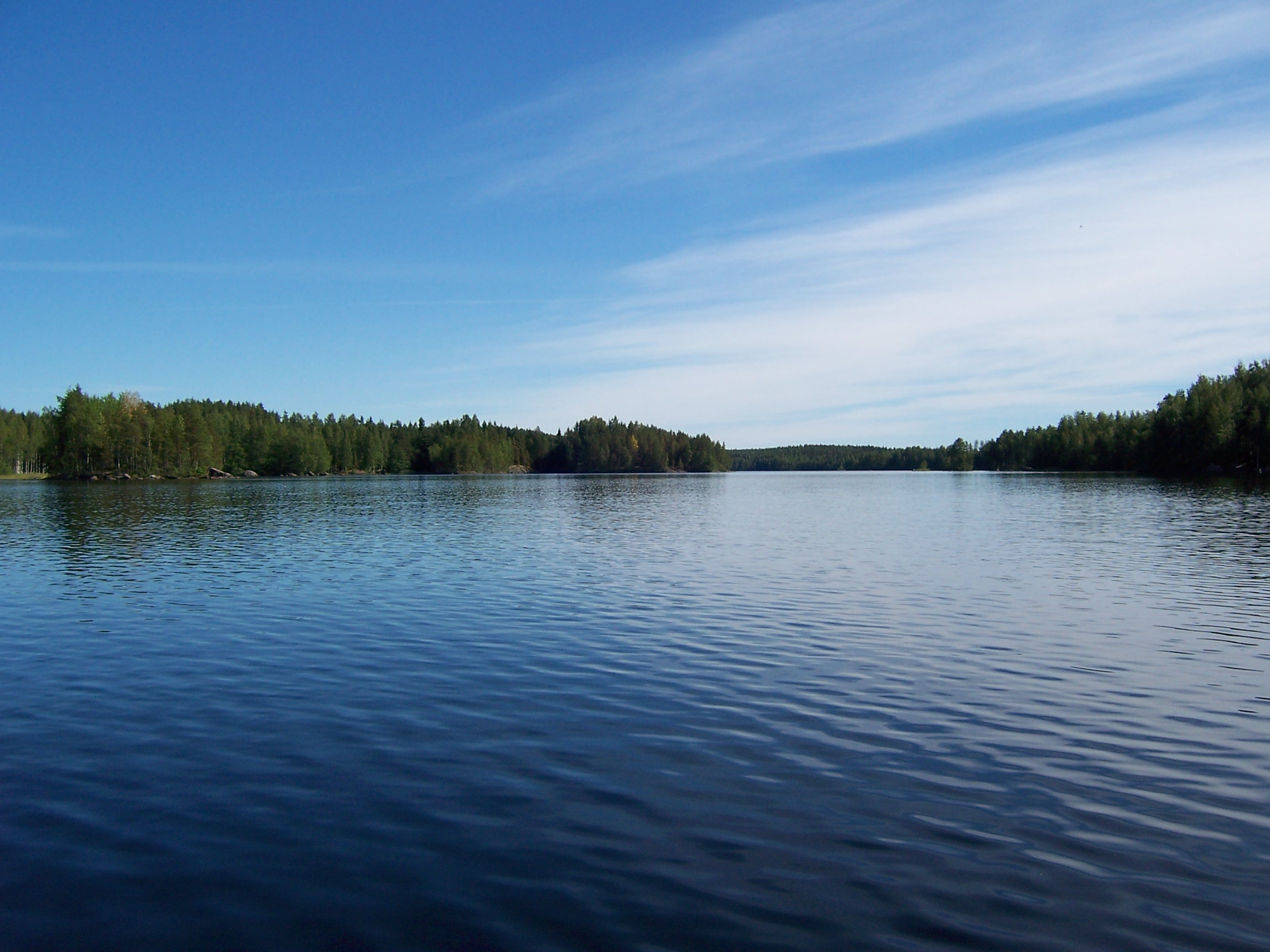
Lake Armisvesi in Hankasalmi.
