= Emu Lehtinen =

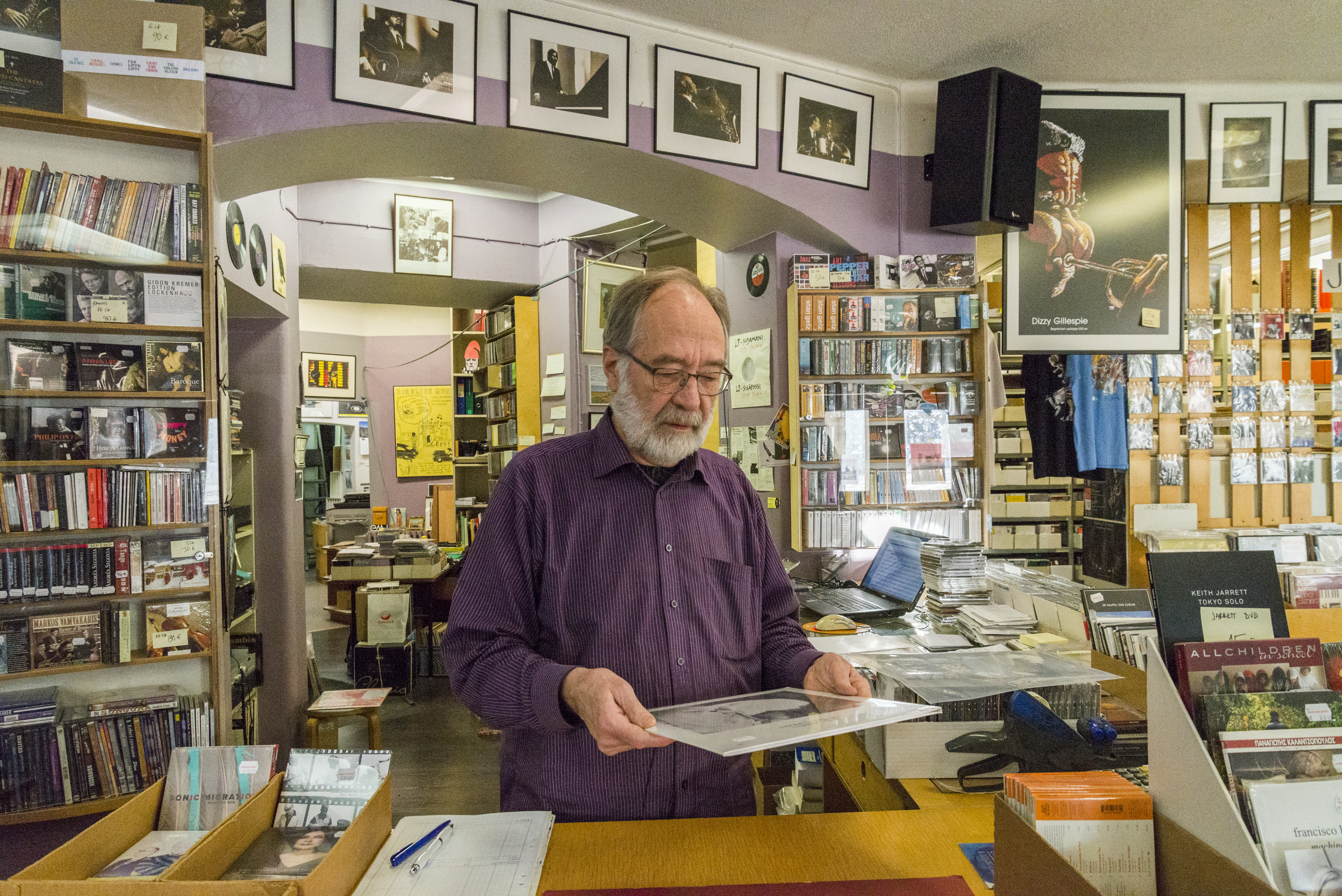
Ilkka “Emu” Lehtinen at his store in 2016.

Ilkka Raimo Olavi “Emu” Lehtinen (3 March 1947 – 22 October 2017) was a record dealer in Helsinki, Finland, a founder and the chief executive officer of the record store Digelius Music. According to Helsingin Sanomat, Lehtinen was “a local guru for people who would be curious to listen to music irrespective of genres, and a person with whose help customers would find wonderful new experiences starting from clean slate.” According to another Helsinki newspaper, Hufvudstadsbladet, Lehtinen was “a living legend in Finnish music circles”.

== Early life ==
Lehtinen was born in Lappeenranta, and the family moved to Helsinki when Lehtinen was three months old. He lived most of his childhood in the Ströms manor in Roihuvuori, East Helsinki. The place is nowadays occupied by the East Helsinki Music Institute. Next to the place there was a green space and a stretch of the coast of the Gulf of Finland, and this is where Lehtinen's interest in birdwatching originated.

Lehtinen's father was an architect, who worked for the architectural department of the Kulutusosuuskuntien keskusliitto (KK), which was part of a well known consumers' co-operative called the E-liike, while his mother was a housewife, who took care of the family's six children. KK bought the Ströms manor and founded an institute called Osuuskauppakoulu there, and at that juncture 10 of their workers' families moved there in 1954. They lived at the manor for 10 years, until KK wanted to have the manor for its own functions.

The family had some interest in music: the grandmother and the mother played the violin, and the grandmother had once played the instrument as an accompaniment to silent movies in the movie theatres in the town of Lappeenranta. The father was a member of The Polytech Choir. Opera singer Matti Lehtinen (1922–2022) was Emu’s uncle. Both parents had their roots in the Lappeenranta vicinity.

Lehtinen went to school in the Herttoniemi primary school and the Kulosaari Secondary School. He was given his nickname "Emu" during his school years: the classroom for natural history had a board, where the students could make a note of passing migratory birds. One student wrote down "emus" as a prank, and then he would say things like, did you see the V-formation of 20 emus during the last break, and he would crack these jokes every day, and somehow the name emu stuck to Lehtinen.

Lehtinen became known as Emu to the extent that "during the early years of our store, when workers came and went in rapid succession, one fellow once answered the phone and said that they're asking for some guy named Ilkka Lehtinen, do you know who it is. – Well, it's me."

== Beginning of Emu's interest in music ==
In 1964 Emu became interested in British and Anglo-American popular music, and he made some attempts to learn to play the piano and the drums, but he ended up what he called a spectator, which meant that he listened fluently to all kinds of music and acquainted himself with it through printed sources of the field.

In 1967, Emu got interested in jazz, "the same year in which there were loads of totally fantastic jazz concerts in Helsinki, such as the Charles Lloyd quartet, Jimi Hendrix was the kind of guy who opened the gates to all kinds of directions, then there was the Miles Davis quintet, Archie Shepp, all of them during that one year."

As far as a profession was concerned, Emu was interested in architecture, and he was employed at the architecture department of KK, and worked there as an assistant drawer for several years. During this time he tried three times to enter the Helsinki University of Technology to study architecture, but he failed each time.

== Entering the music business and founding his own record store ==
In 1969 Emu went through national service, and when discharged, he returned to KK. He was paid enough to be able to buy records. He now became a well-known customer in the Helsinki record shops, and he also ordered records from abroad and passed them on to his friends.

Early in 1970 a record store called Tunnelin levy was founded in the Helsinki Asematunneli, the future metro station, and in late summer that year there was an advertisement in Helsingin Sanomat that a shopkeeper was required there. Emu sought the place and was accepted, and while working there he and some others got the idea of founding their own record store.

Tunnelin levy got their records from whole saler Pertti Lehto, who imported records under the auspices of his own company called Musica, and Emu used to write for him the lists of titles needed in Tunnelin levy. Lehto was the man who suggested the opening of a new store to Emu. A woman by the name of Tiina Ruolanto, who was also working in Tunnelin levy but who was leaving the company, was talked into the venture, and through Lehto they knew a man named Erkki Kurenniemi, who was also asked to join the forces. Kurenniemi had a company called Digelius Electronics Finland, and the name of the record shop came from that company, Digelius being an amalgam word, combining the words digital, electronics and Sibelius.

Later Digelius Electronics went bankrupt, and Tiina Ruolanto moved to Sweden. Digelius Music was left with three partners, when Juhani "Juntsa" Aalto bought half of the stock.

Helsingin Sanomat wrote the following about Emu:

He was never the sole owner of Digelius Music nor its only employee, but he became the soul of the shop, and quite deservedly so. Emu was Digelius and Digelius was Emu; he always had time to greet customers, trade thoughts with them and tell anecdotes that ended in hearty laughter, stories that he never ran out of. – —

Lehtinen gave the following reasons for the success and longevity of Digelius: specializing, a wise concentration on jazz, folk music and world music. A factor in this was, of course, his indefatigability and his enthusiasm. Music was more than a merchandise to him, it was his passion.

Lehtinen joked that he was married to Digelius Music, and to the outside this seemed to be the case. His bicycle was often inside the shop before 8 am, and the lights went out only after 6 pm

Digelius Music and Emu became synonyms for excellent customer service. Once in 2015 a man came in the store and left a bag full of CDs on the floor, not bothering to wait to hear what the store owner thought about them. Emu went through the CDs, and found next to nothing worth selling in his store. However, a query came in the same day from Lieksa, Eastern Finland, asking if the store had any records by the French singer Joe Dassin. By coincidence, the bag contained a CD by this artist, and even the two songs that were the favourites of the daughter of the man from Lieksa. Emu answered him that he would mail the CD to him free of charge. Later he received thanks in an e-mail, in which the man told him that he ran a sheep farm and that in gratitude, the first-born lamb of that spring had been named "Digelius". He also sent a photo of the lamb.

== Birdwatching ==
Emu was "a passionate birdwatcher", and he was one of the most active members of Tringa, the Greater Helsinki Ornithologist Society. Among other things, he was one of the founders of its bird observatory in Hanko, and he was in charge of it during 1979–1984. He served on the bird observatory committee from 1981 on, and as its president during 1984–2017.

Birdwatching took Emu abroad a number of times, most often to India, which he visited 18 times. Goa was his favourite place there. One trip took him to Namibia, to Walvis Bay and Kavango. He had seen about 300–400 species of birds in Finland, and around 2000 in the whole world, of which some 830 in India.

== Honours ==
In 2011 Jazzmuusikot, the Finnish association of Jazz musicians, named Emu the Jazz Digger of the Year. This award is given to a jazz listener, who "shows genuine and lasting interest in jazz music and represents a decent and open-minded community spirit". In addition, it was said that Lehtinen had acted as an encompassing and encouraging flag bearer for jazz music and as a person who brings musicians and their audiences together.

== Death ==
Emu died in October 2017, after having been ill for half a week. His last day at work in Digelius Music was Wednesday, 18 October 2017. The following day he went into a hospital due to dyspnoea, and on Friday he was told he had leukemia. He died in Helsinki early on Sunday morning.

A jazz concert in Lehtinen's memory was held at Korjaamo in Helsinki on 11 December 2017.
