= Kulosaari =

Coordinates: 60°11′N 25°01′E

Kulosaari Brändö
- Helsinki Subdivision
- Position of Kulosaari within Helsinki
- Country: Finland
- Region: Uusimaa
- Sub-region: Greater Helsinki
- Municipality: Helsinki
- District: Southeastern
- Area: 1.81 km^{2} (0.70 sq mi)
- Population (2004): 3,770
  - Density: 2,083/km^{2} (5,390/sq mi)
- Postal codes: 00570
- Subdivision number: 42
- Neighbouring subdivisions: Herttoniemenranta; Länsi-Herttoniemi; Mustikkamaa-Korkeasaari; Sörnäinen; Tullisaari

Kulosaari (Swedish: Brändö) is an island and an East Helsinki suburb in Helsinki, Finland. It is also the 42nd neighbourhood of the city. Construction of villas on the island started in the beginning of the 20th century, and a bridge from Sörnäinen was opened in 1919. Kulosaari was an independent municipality since 1922 until 1946, when it was merged to Helsinki.

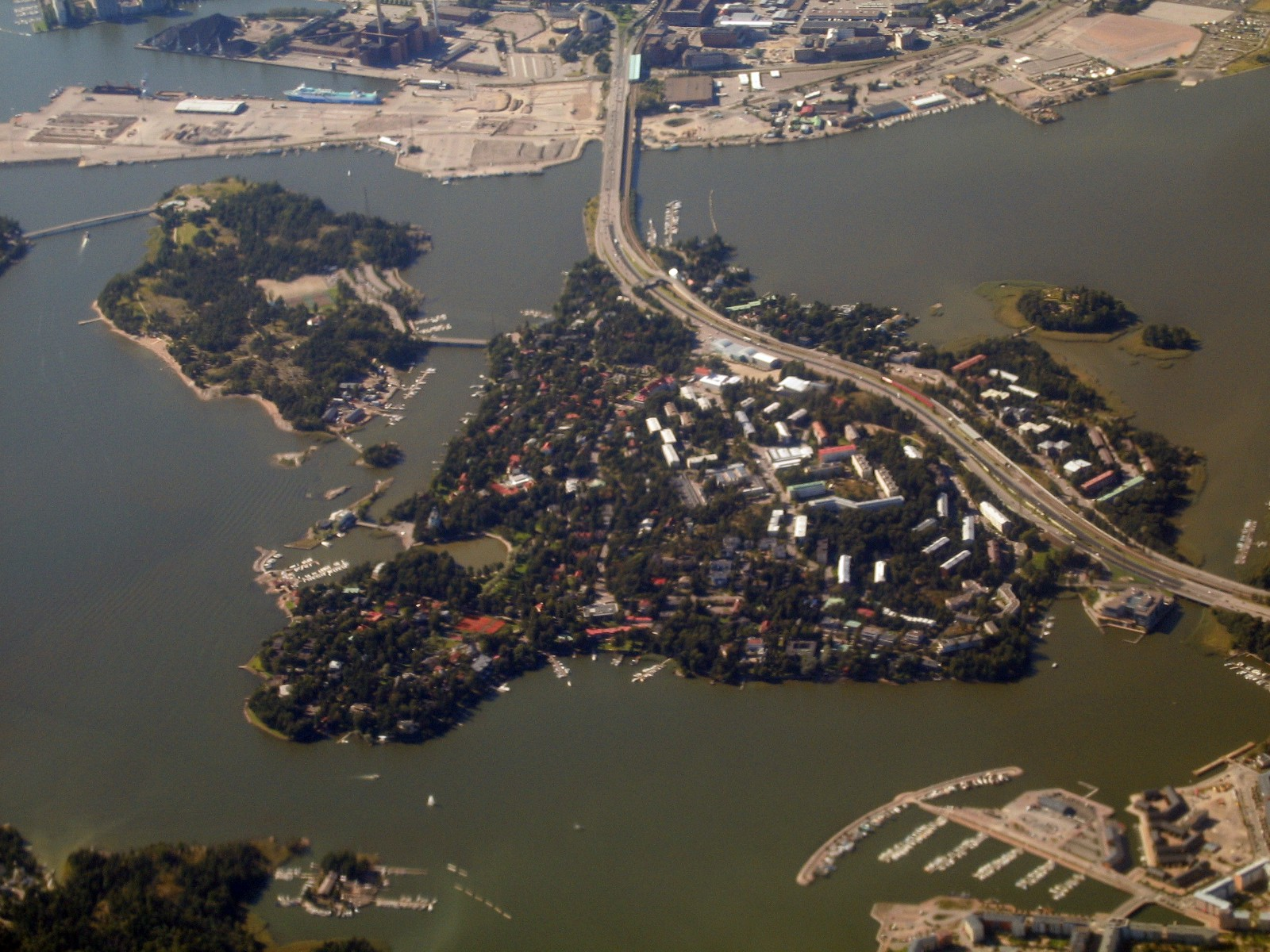
Kulosaari from the air, looking westwards towards the centre of Helsinki, with the connected island of Mustikkamaa visible on the left.

Kulosaari is home to 3,700 people (2003), and has a size of 1.81 square kilometres (0.70 sq mi). The island is host to both Swedish-speaking and Finnish-speaking primary schools and the Kulosaari Secondary School (Kulosaaren Yhteiskoulu, or KSYK) international secondary school, as well as Brändö Gymnasium, a gymnasium for Swedish-speaking Finns.

Trams served the island from 1910 to 1951 – before the first bridge was completed, ferries were used to transport the trams. In 1982 Kulosaari got its own subway station, an original station of the Helsinki Metro. An important highway called Itäväylä, serving Helsinki's eastern suburbs, goes through the island, cutting it in two halves.

Kulosaari is connected via a short bridge to the adjacent island of Mustikkamaa, which is used for various recreational purposes.

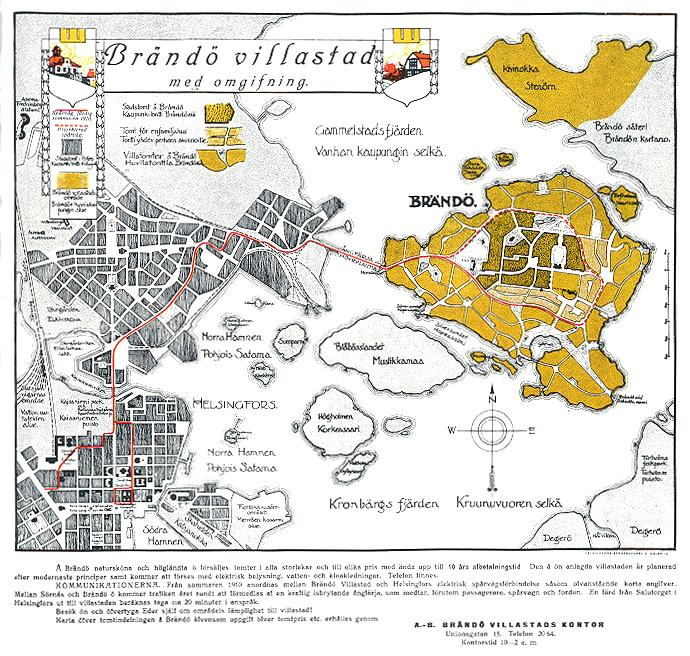
Plan for the Brändö garden suburb, after Lars Sonck, c. 1909.

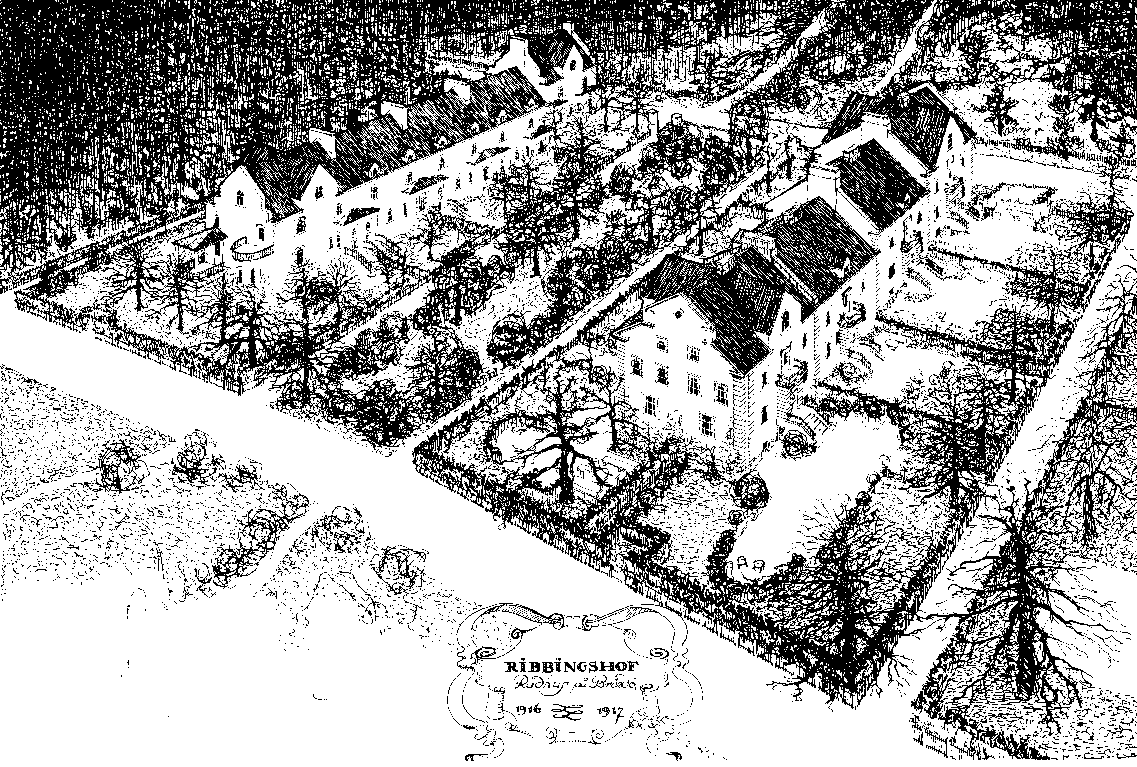
Ribbinginhovi terraced housing, Armas Lindgren, 1920.

== History and architecture ==
The current Finnish name of district, Kulosaari, is relatively young; its Swedish name Brändö has been in use since 1808. As early as the 18th century, the island was called Stuguö [lit: cottage island] or Stugulandet [lit: cottage land], based on a cottage owned by a fisherman. The island has long belonged to the lands of Kulosaari Manor, the manor house (designed by architect Carl Ludvig Engel, 1810) and grounds of which still exist, though it is situated on the adjacent island.

So-called Brändö Villastad was founded in 1907 by a group of businessmen, architects and engineers outside the city of Helsinki, including Allan Granfelt. Their aim was to form on 250 acres of the barely inhabited island a town consisting of modern villas for middle-class families.

The architect Lars Sonck, who was a member of the company, drew up the town plan for the area in 1909, the town-planning principles of which were inspired by Austrian planner Camillo Sitte's influential book Städtebau as well as Garden City Planning derived from England, with Sonck striving to give as many house owners as possible direct access to the sea from their plot, while public buildings were placed further inland. In Sonck's first plan, a formal connection was made between the highest point of the island, Vapaamuurarinmäki, marked later by the church bell tower, and the most remarkable natural formation on the island, the lagoon-like inland bay (Gloet or Kluuvi) on the southern seafront of the island. Built between the two was the Ribbinginhovi park allée. The villas and terraced housing built within the plan were designed mainly in accordance with the then prevailing Jugendstil architecture. The largest buildings built at that time were the Kulosaari Hotel (nowadays Wihuri House, company headquarters), 1917, also by Sonck, and the Domus apartment building (nowadays Brändö Gymnasium school), 1916, by architect J.S. Siren. Other notable buildings are the Kulosaari Casino, 1915 by Armas Lindgren and the Ribbinginhovi terraced housing, 1920, also by Lindgren. Kulosaari Church, 1935, was designed by architect Bertel Jung in the Jugendstil style, but the adjacent vast classical-functionalist campanile was designed later by Lindgren.

Nowadays, Kulosaari is also noted for being the location of a significant number of purpose-built foreign embassy buildings, including those of China, India, Vietnam, Slovakia, Iraq and Iran.

The Relander Square (Relanderinaukio) in Kulosaari was named after L. K. Relander, the second President of Finland, in 1959.

== Politics ==
Results of the 2011 Finnish parliamentary election in Kulosaari:

- National Coalition Party 43.7%
- Swedish People's Party 14.5%
- Green League 13.7%
- Social Democratic Party 9.0%
- True Finns 7.4%
- Left Alliance 5.4%
- Centre Party 3.5%
- Christian Democrats 1.5%

== Buildings of Kulosaari ==
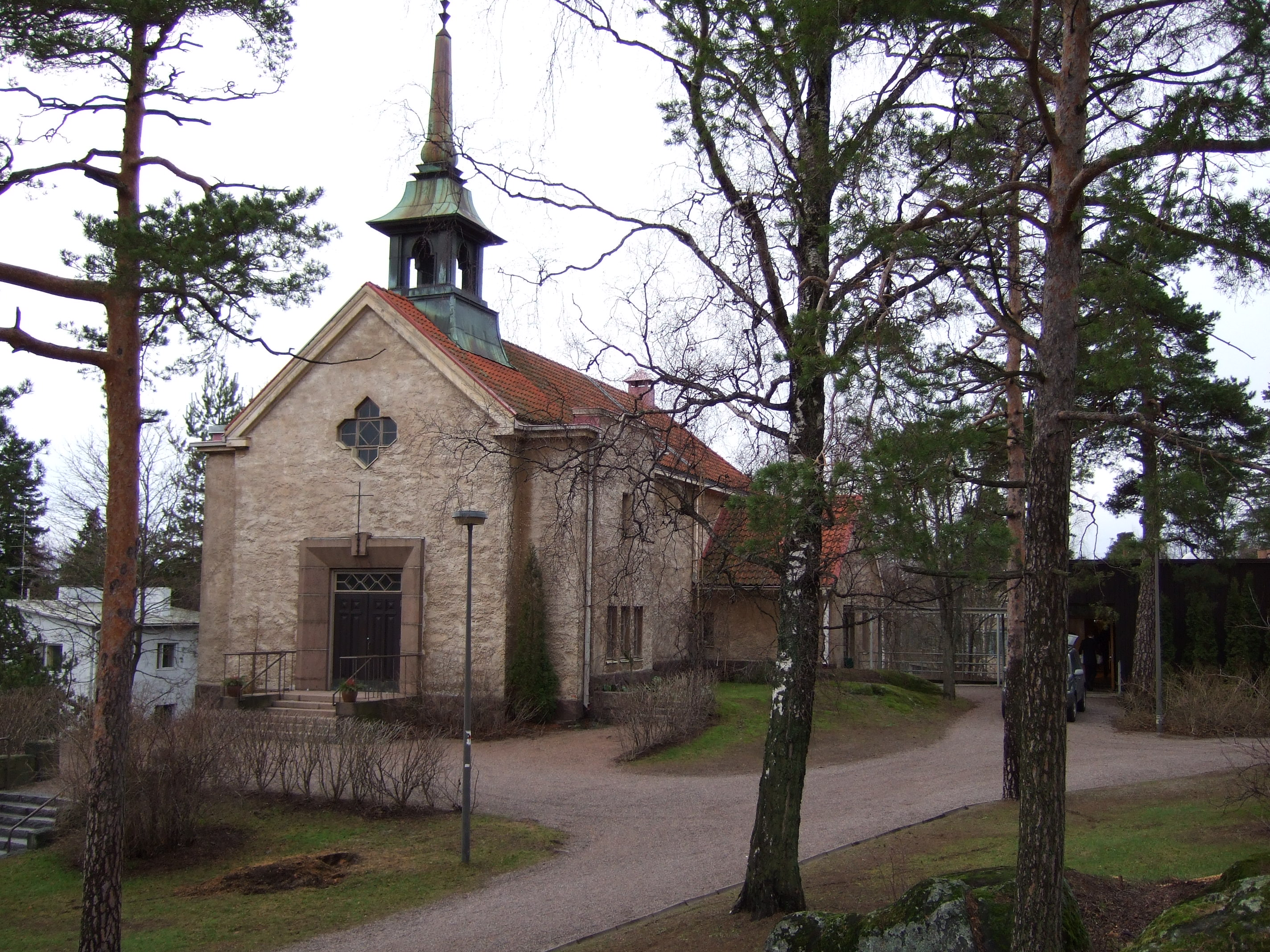
Kulosaari Church, Bertel Jung, 1935.

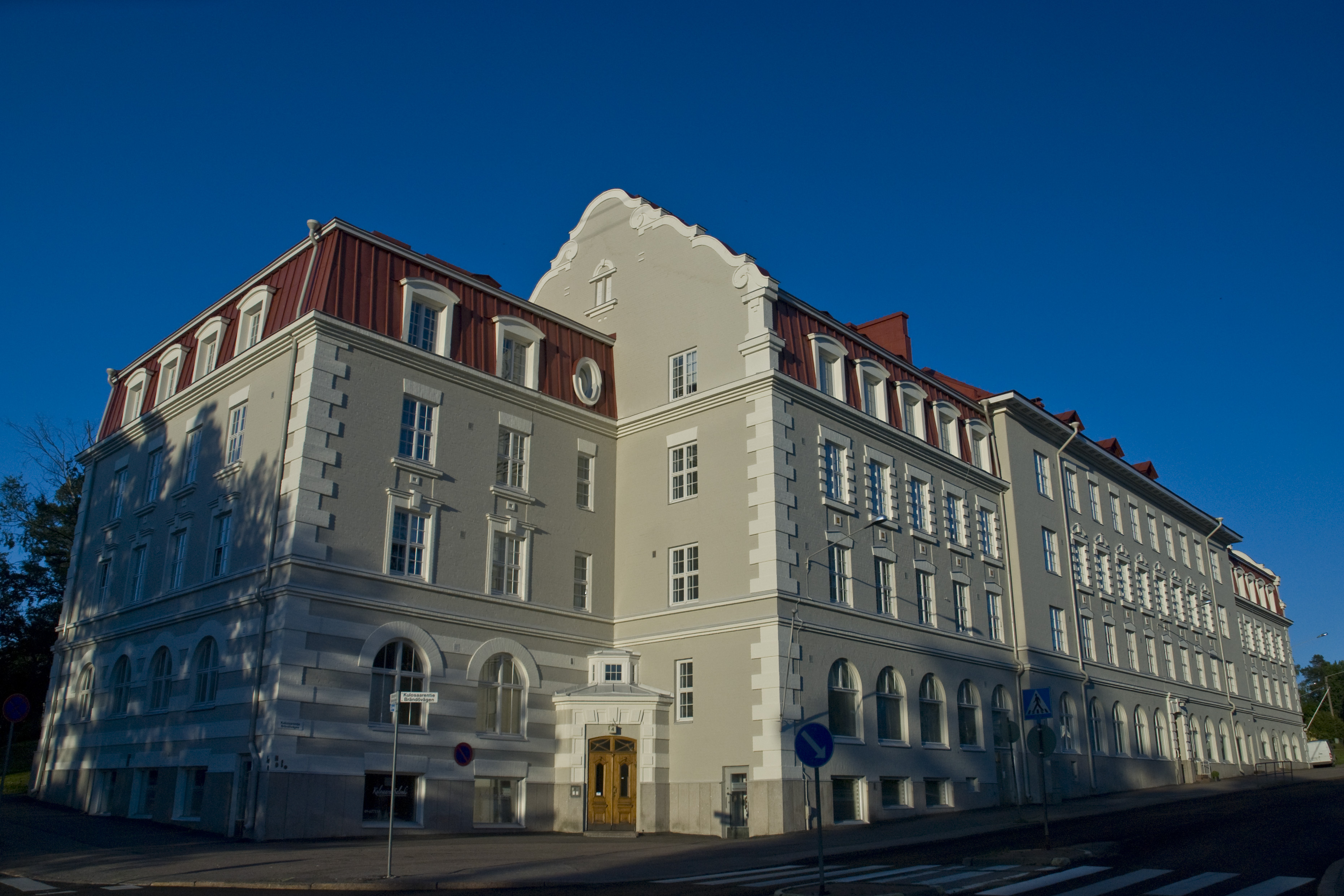
Domus apartment building, J.S Sirén, 1916.

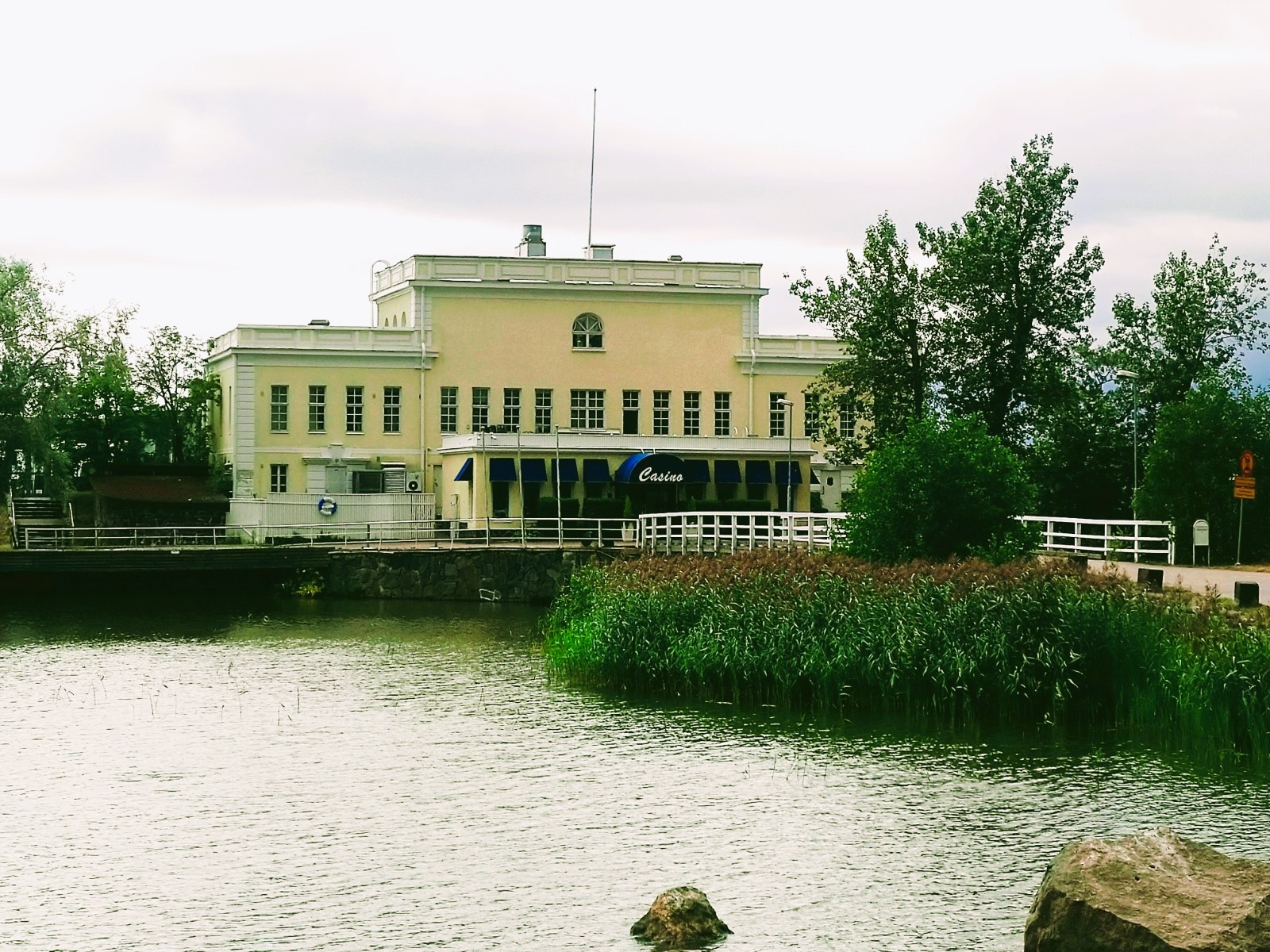
Kulosaari Casino, Armas Lindgren, 1915.

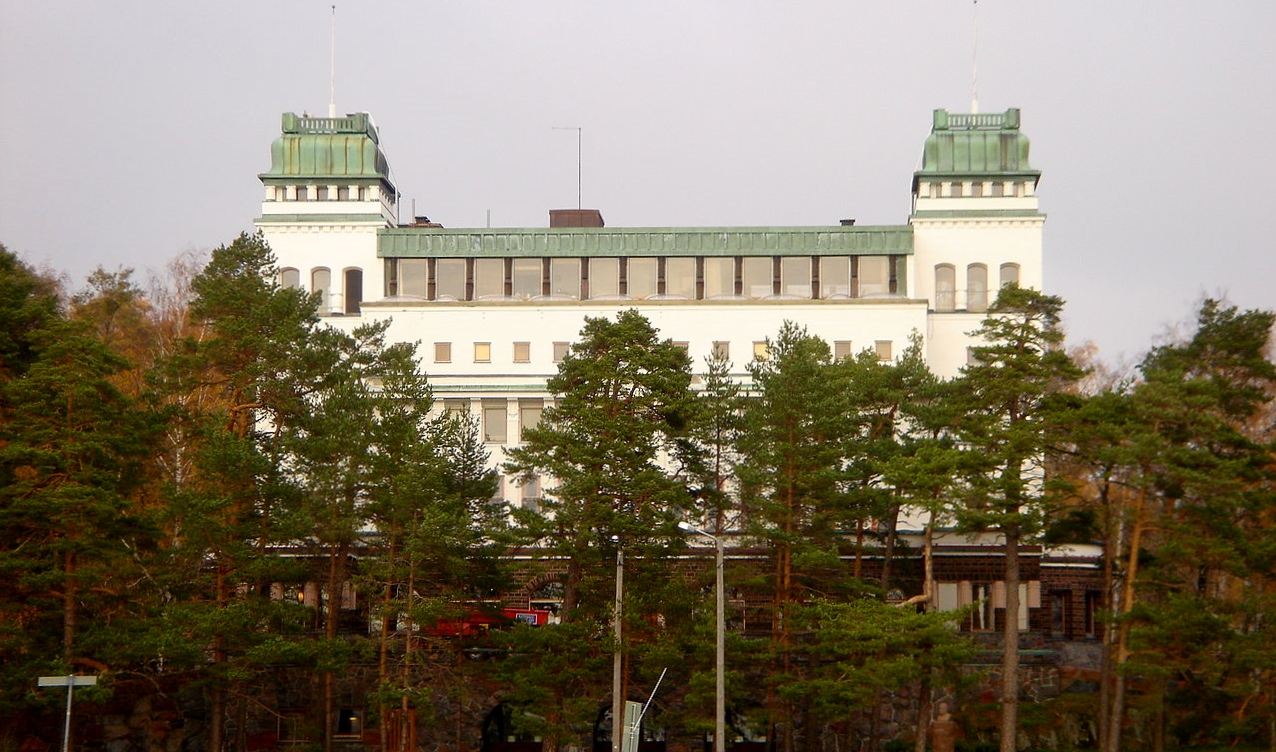
Former Kulosaari Hotel, Lars Sonck, 1917.

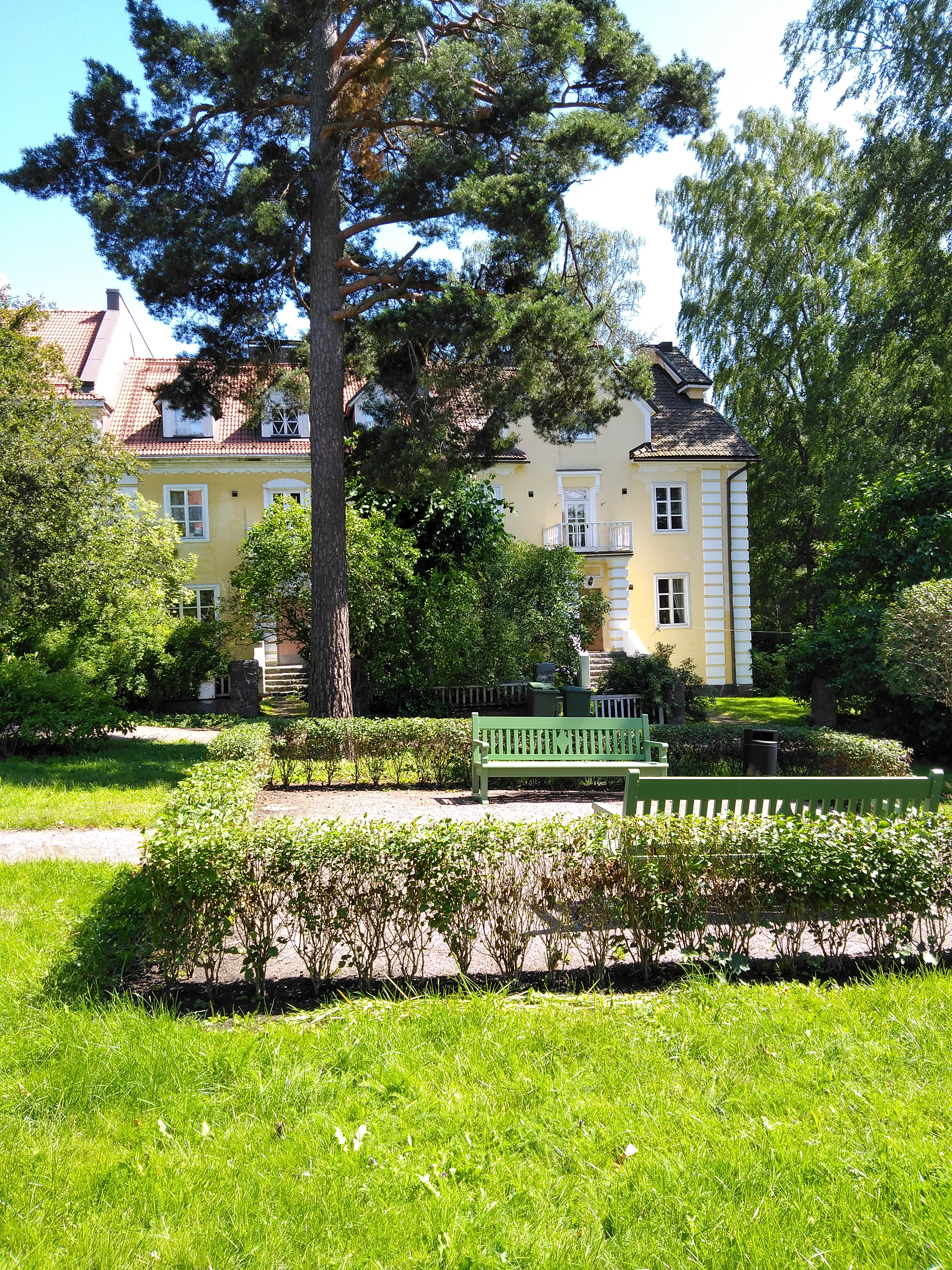
Ribbinginhovi terraced housing, Armas Lindgren, 1920.

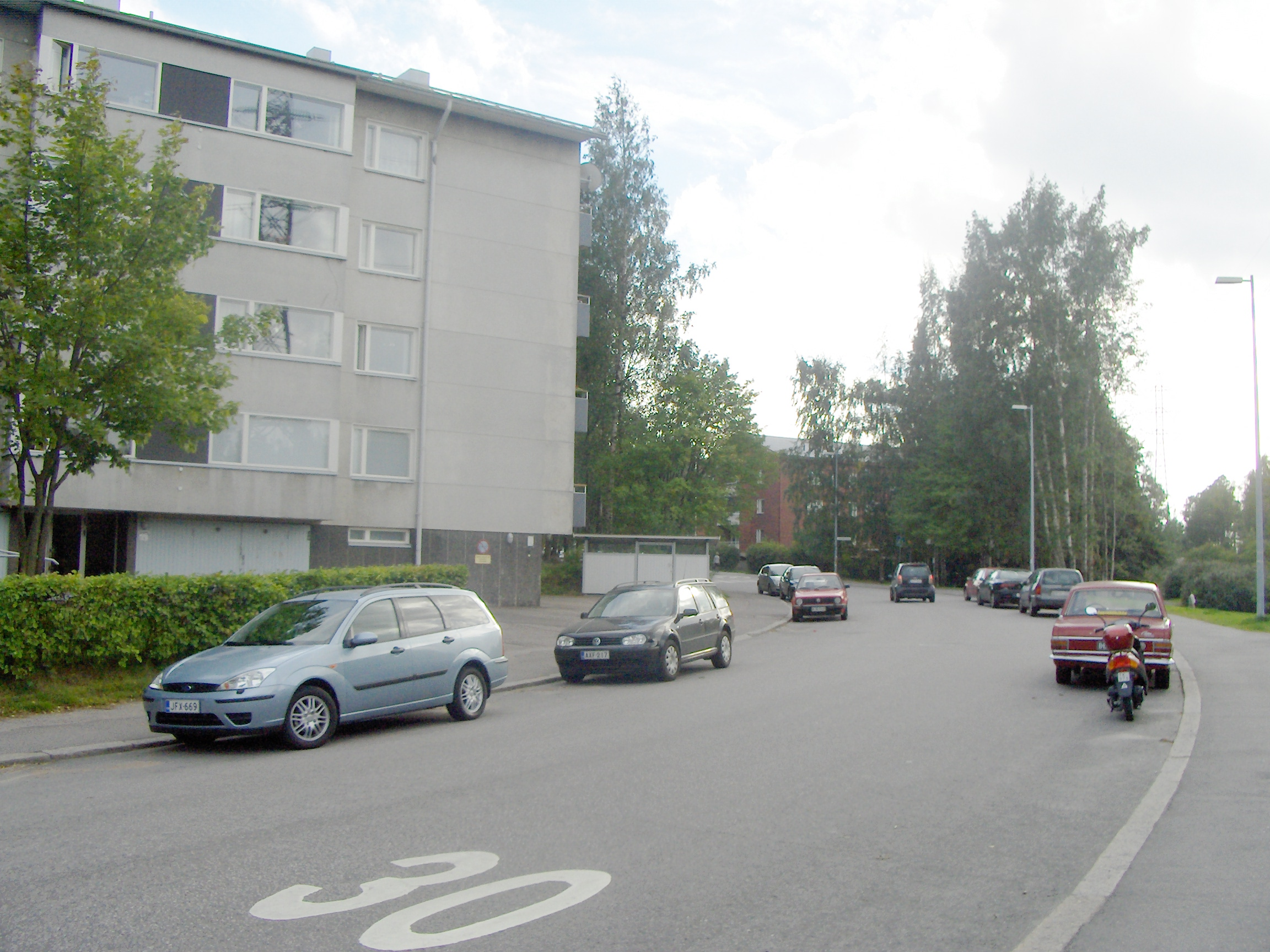
View of the "Svinhufvudintie" road, exposing low-rise apartment blocks from the 1960s.
