= Carl Ludvig Engel =

German architect (1778–1840)

Carl Ludwig Engel
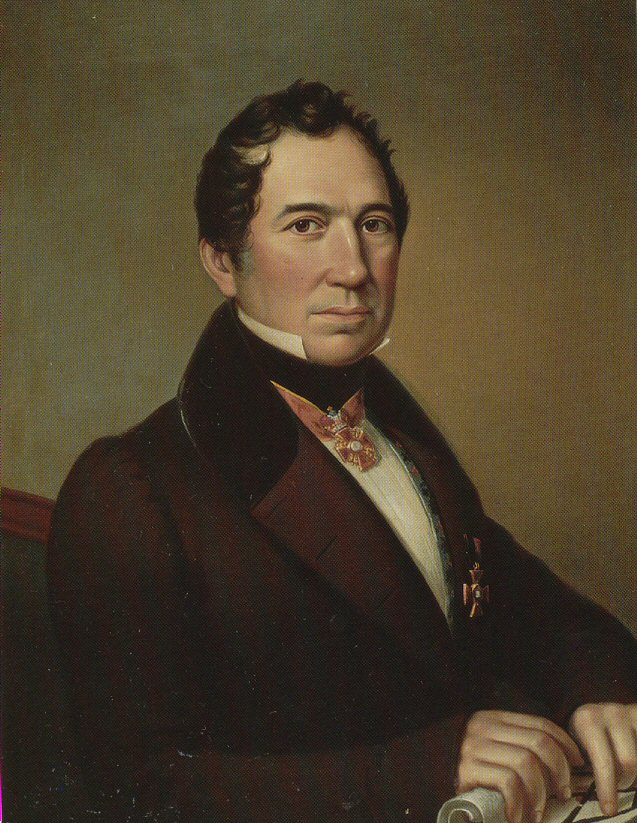
- Portrait of Carl Ludwig Engel by Johan Erik Lindh
- Born: 3 July 1778; Charlottenburg, Berlin, Prussia
- Died: 14 May 1840 (aged 61); Helsinki, Grand Duchy of Finland
- Occupation: Architect
- Buildings: Helsinki Cathedral; Senate building Helsinki City Hall; National Library of Finland; University of Helsinki main building

Carl Ludvig Engel or Johann Carl Ludwig Engel (3 July 1778 – 14 May 1840) was a German architect and the first internationally renowned architect to work in Finland. Under his direction, Helsinki was transformed in the early 19th century into a worthy capital for the Grand Duchy of Finland, with a monumental neoclassical centre around Senate Square. His works include Helsinki Cathedral, the Senate building, the Helsinki City Hall, and the main building and library of the University of Helsinki. From 1824 until his death he served as head of the Intendant's Office, responsible for public buildings throughout Finland.

== Biography ==
=== Early career: Berlin and Tallinn ===
Carl Ludvig Engel was born on 3 July 1778 in Charlottenburg, Berlin, into a family of master masons. He trained at the Berlin Bauakademie, qualifying as a surveyor before becoming an architect in 1804. After graduating he served in the Prussian building administration. The stagnation caused by Napoleon's victory over Prussia in 1806 forced him and other architects to find work abroad. In 1808, he applied for the position as town architect of Tallinn, Estonia and started working there in 1809. Through this post he came into contact with St. Petersburg and its neoclassical Empire style. Finland was also close by and was soon to become a Grand Duchy under Russian rule. Only a small number of buildings from his Tallinn period can be securely attributed to Engel. In 1814 he travelled first to St. Petersburg and then accepted a commission in Turku, Finland.

=== Helsinki and the reconstruction of the capital ===
From 1814 to 1815, he worked for a businessman in Turku, Finland, where he came in contact with Johan Albrecht Ehrenström, who led the project of rebuilding Helsinki. The city had just been promoted to be the new capital of the Grand Duchy of Finland. Ehrenström was searching for a talented architect to work by his side and this meeting proved to be decisive for Engel's future career. Engel did not however stay in Finland at this stage. In March 1815 he travelled to St. Petersburg where he got private employment.

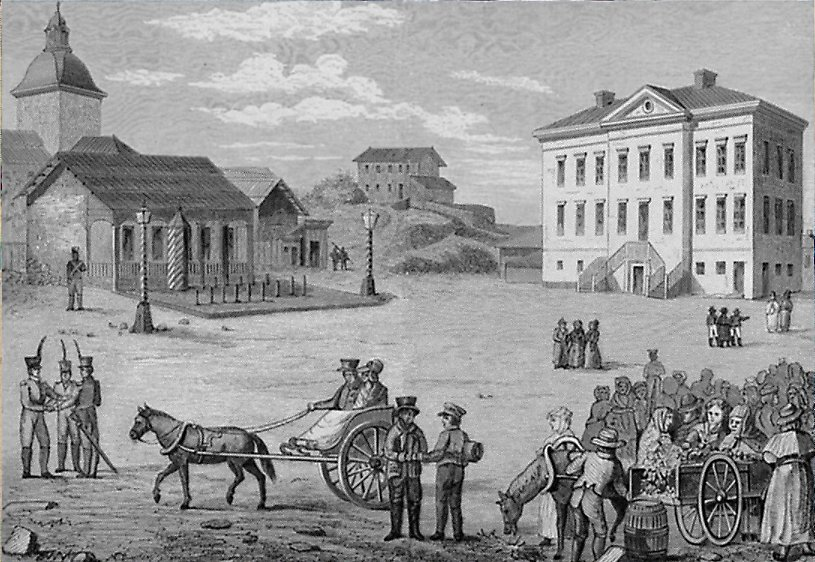
Drawing by Engel of Helsinki in 1820

In 1816 Engel was planning on returning to his city of birth, but at the same time Ehrenström got approval for his plan to bring Engel to Helsinki. Engel's plans for Helsinki had been shown to Czar Alexander I and in February 1816 Engel was appointed architect of the reconstruction committee for Helsinki, a post that would become his life's work.

=== Senate Square ===
The Senate Square and the buildings surrounding it represent the centrepiece of Engel's work in Helsinki and a unique synthesis of European architectural traditions. The square, created by the city plan of 1812, follows a tradition derived from the Capitolium in Rome, with two buildings of symmetrical facades — the Senate House (1818) and the main building of the university (1828) — flanking a central space. The square is dominated by Helsinki Cathedral (begun 1818), which rises above both buildings on a monumental flight of steps. In designing the cathedral, Engel drew on two direct models: the twin churches on the Gendarmenmarkt in his native Berlin, and ultimately the tradition of St Peter's Basilica in Rome.

The Senate House facade reflects Engel's mastery of the classical orders. He used the Corinthian order on the main facade — regarded in the classical tradition as the symbol of power — and surmounted it with a dome that, together with the temple pediment, forms an allusion to the Pantheon. Engel owned and made frequent use of Andrea Palladio's I Quattro Libri dell'Architettura as a source of inspiration, and his command of classical precedent is evident throughout the square.

=== Head of the Intendant's Office ===
In 1819–1820, when Engel's first creations were nearing completion, his status as head architect of the Grand Duchy was established as he received building assignments both private and public in other parts of Finland. The final confirmation came when in 1824 he was appointed head of the statewide Intendant's Office, responsible for all key state buildings throughout the country, a position he held following the resignation of its first head, the Italian-born architect Carlo Bassi, and which he retained until his death. Among his other key works from this period is Helsinki Old Church in Kamppi, completed in 1826. He designed the first theater of Helsinki, Engels Teater, in 1827.

Among Engel's most architecturally ambitious works is the University Library in Helsinki (1836). It departs from contemporary library buildings in both its floor plan and spatial structure, drawing instead on Roman precedent. The entrance hall evokes a Roman atrium in the manner described by Palladio, while the main reading spaces are arranged around a large transverse barrel vault flanked by colonnades — a structure Engel adapted from the Baths of Diocletian in Rome, which he knew through Palladio's measured drawings published in 1770. In this way Engel created an association with an ancient library through spatial structure rather than literal imitation.

After the Great Fire of Turku in 1827, Engel drew up a new city plan for Turku that established a set of fire-prevention principles which became the standard for Finnish urban planning. These included streets at least 30 ells (approximately 18 metres) wide, the division of the city into fire zones by esplanades, tree-lined firebreaks within blocks, and a prohibition on multi-storey wooden buildings. The same principles were subsequently applied in city plans drawn up under Engel's supervision for Tampere (1830), Tavastehus (1831), Borgå (1832), Jyväskylä (1833) and St. Michel (1837).

Engel died on 14 May 1840 in Helsinki.

== Gallery ==
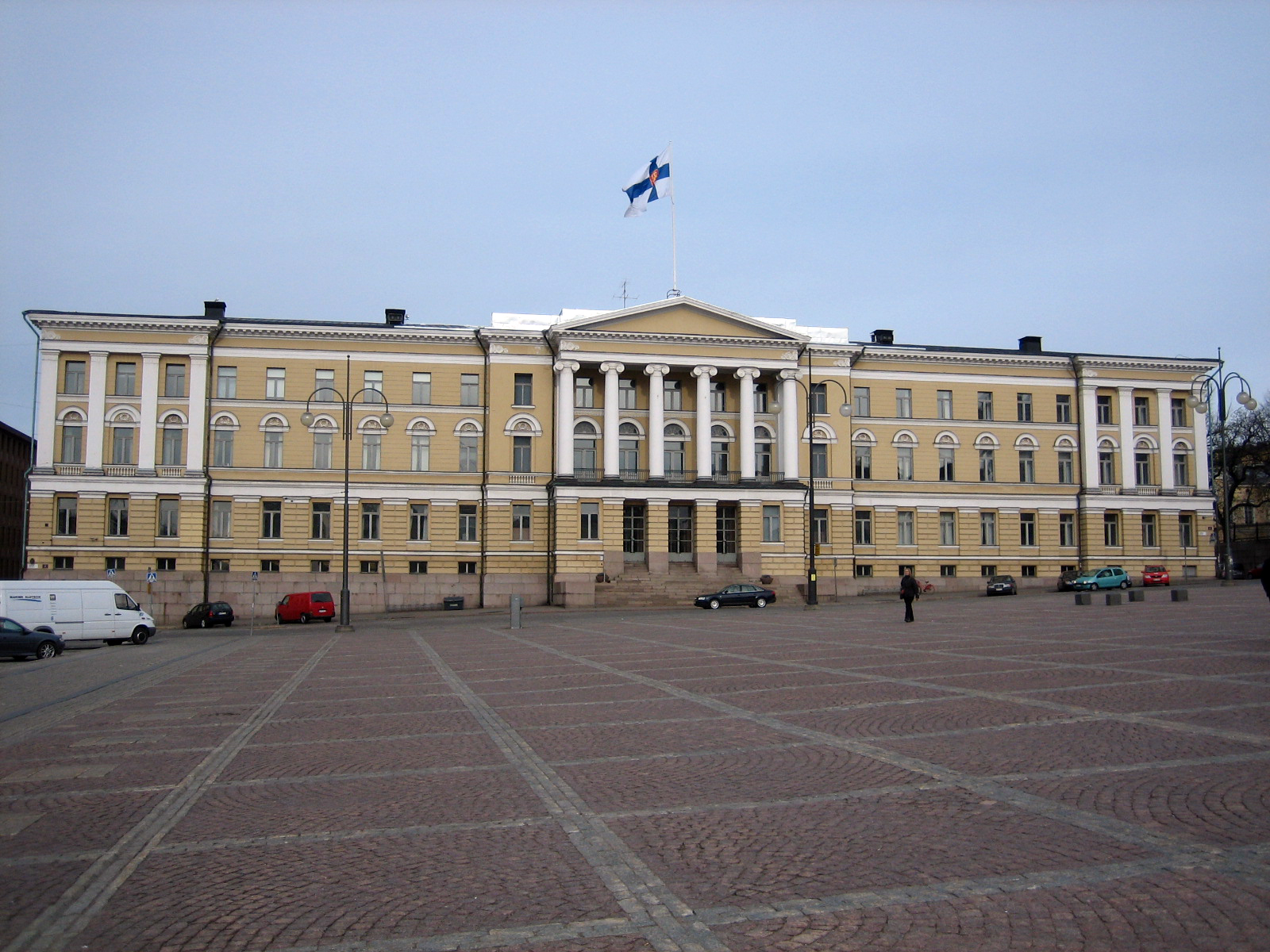
The main building of the University of Helsinki

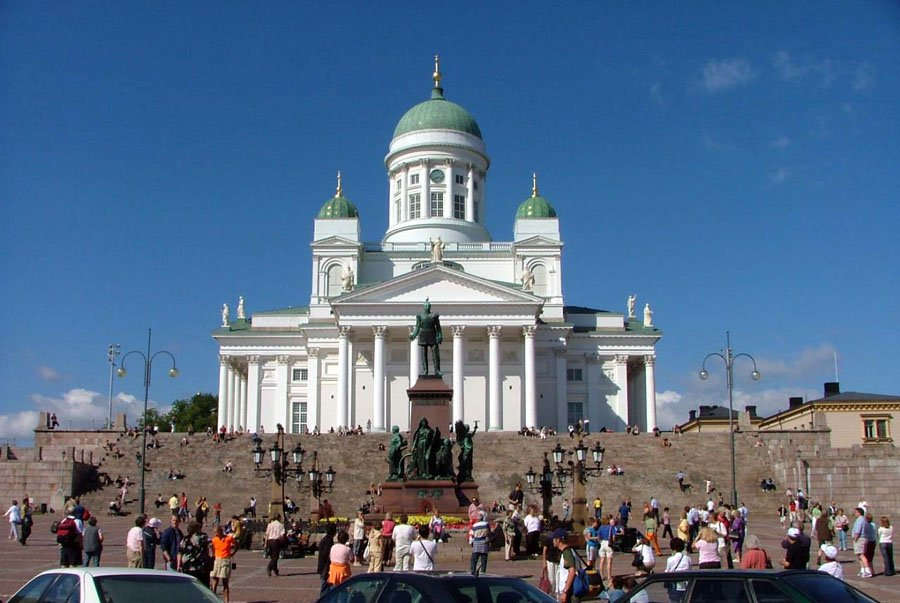
The Senate Square and Lutheran Cathedral in Helsinki

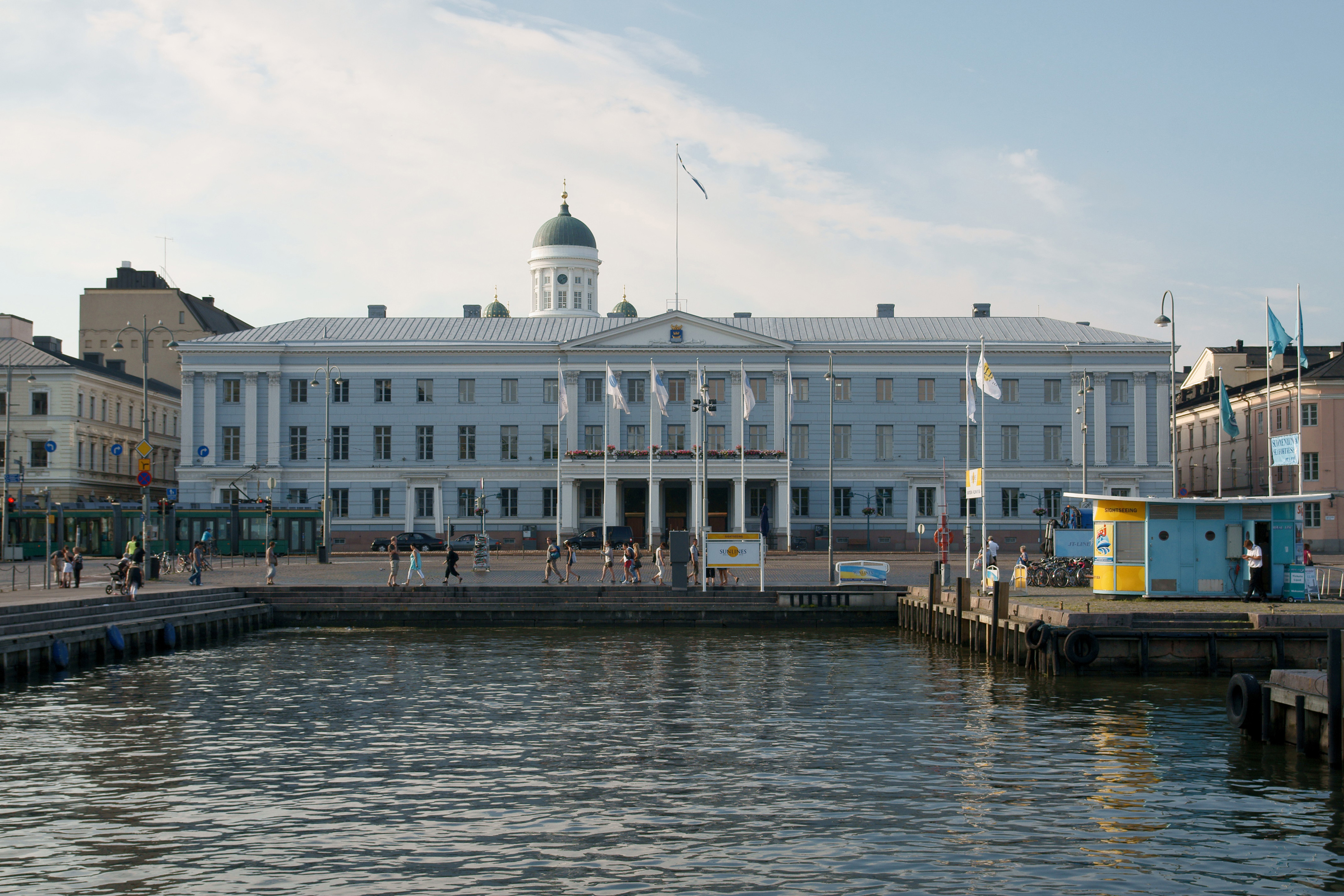
Helsinki City Hall (1833), originally a hotel

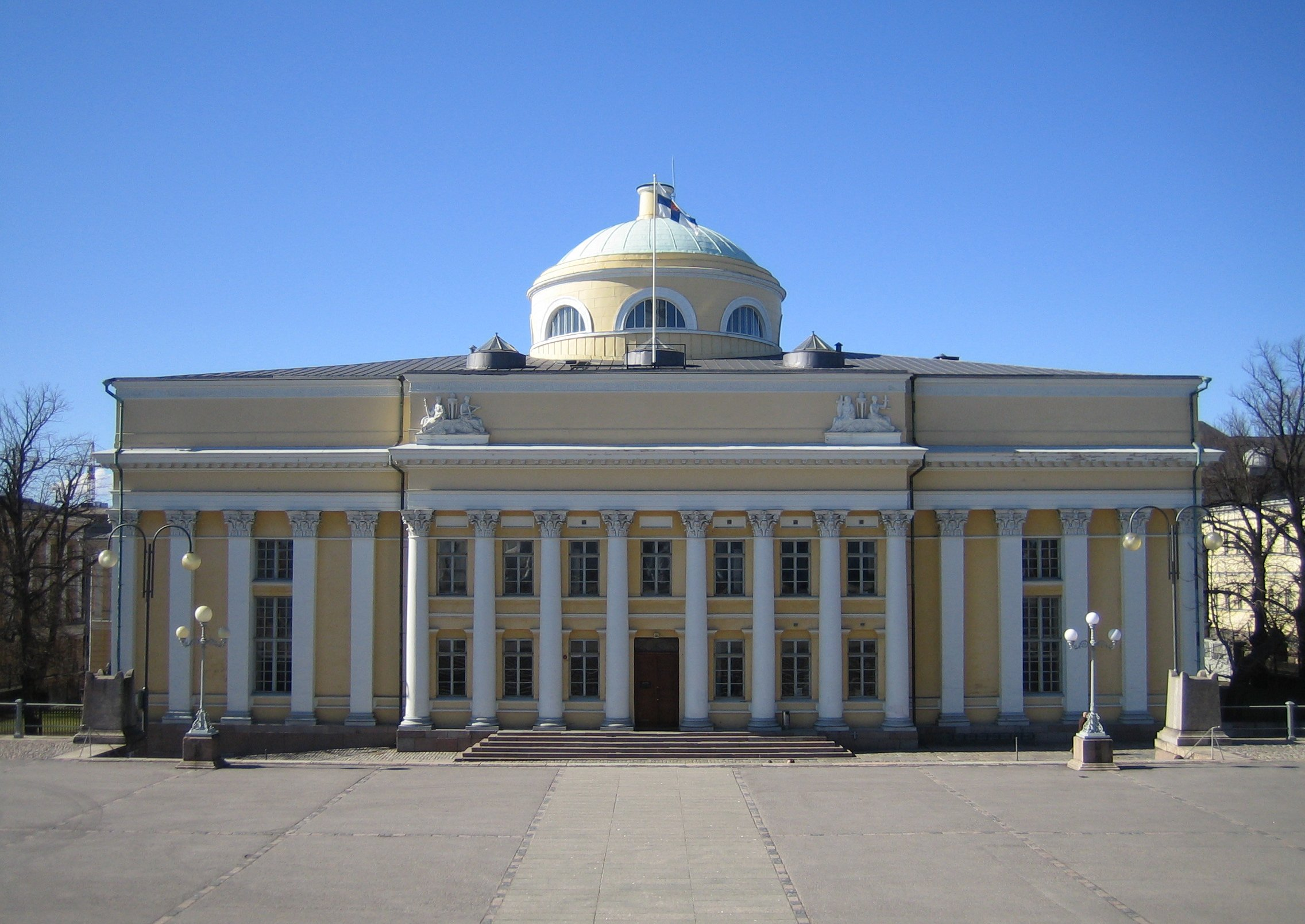
National Library of Finland

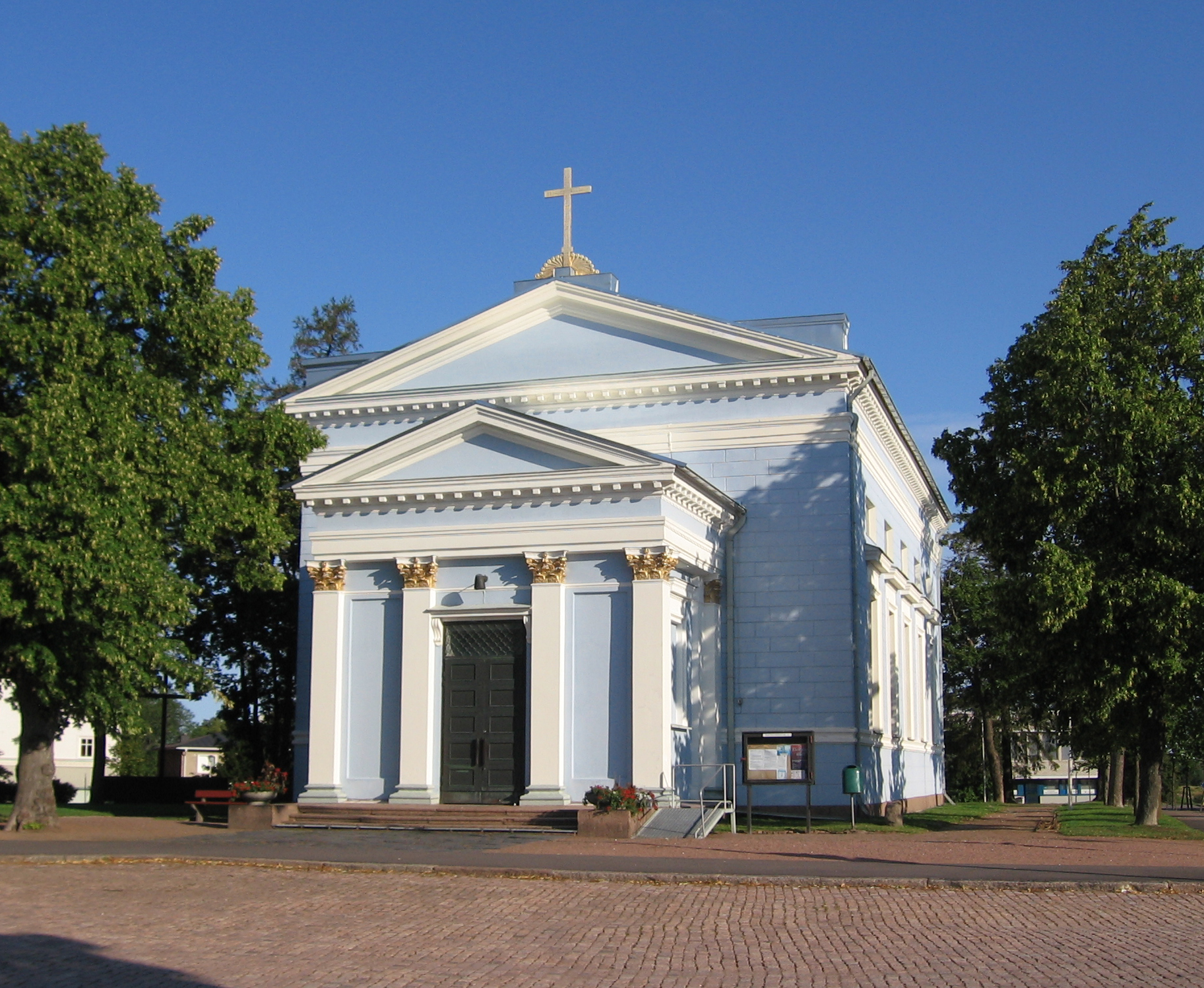
St. John's Church in Hamina

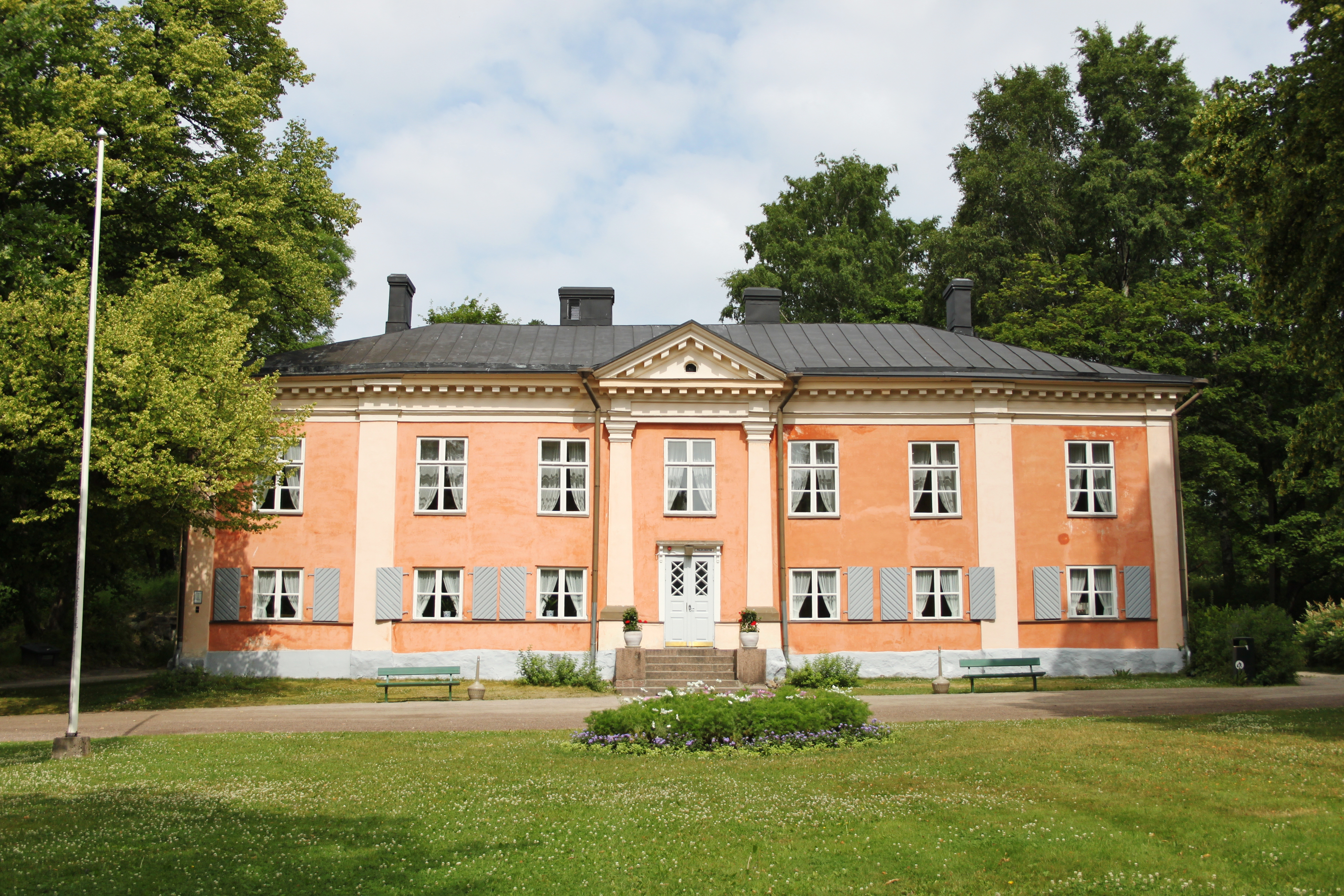
Kulosaari Manor (c. 1810)

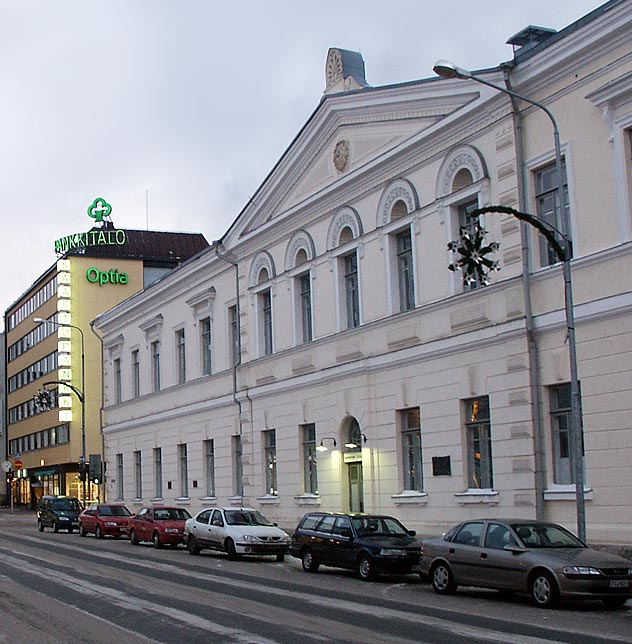
Kuopio Lyceum High School in Kuopio (1826)

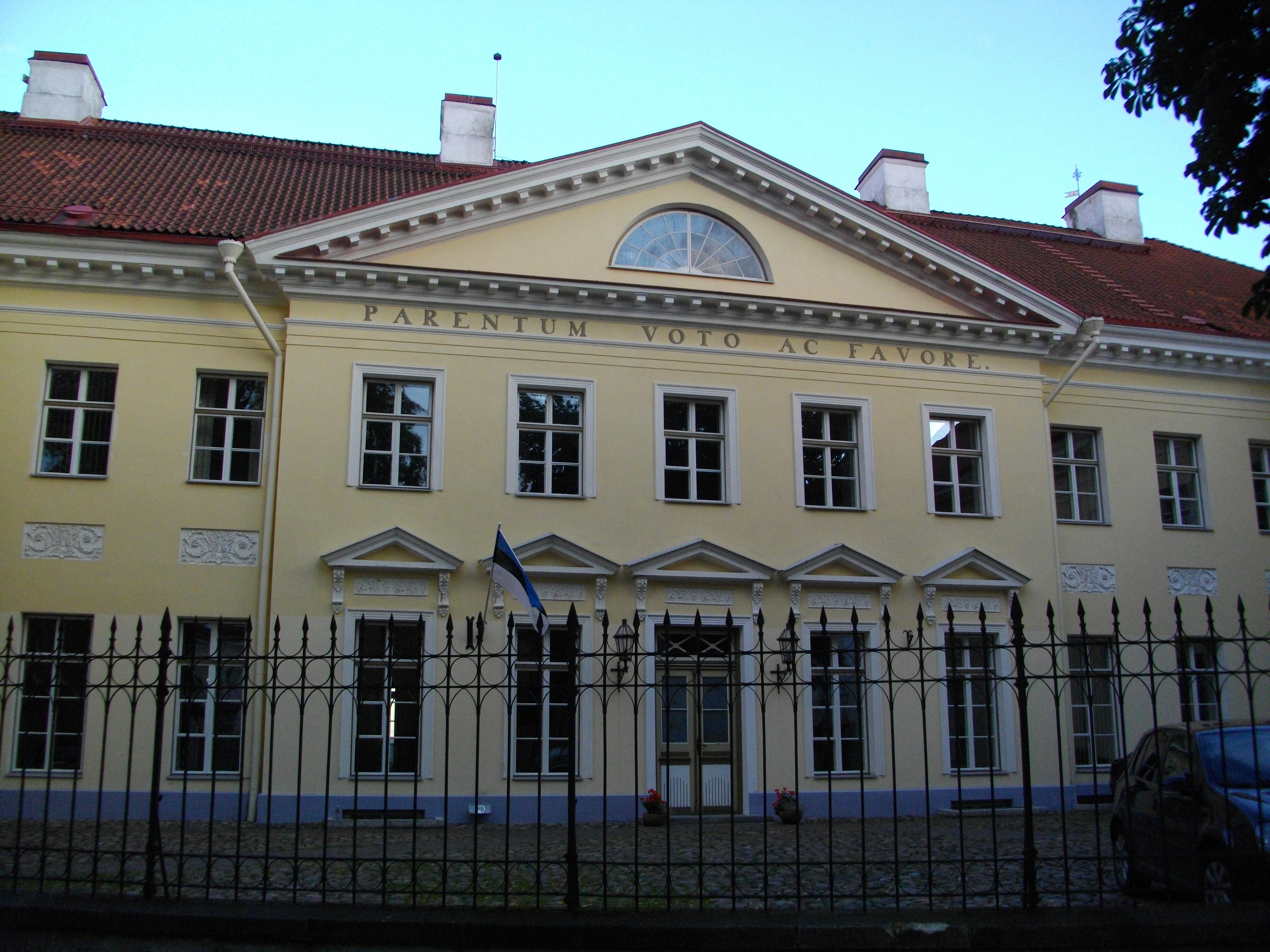
Palace on Kohtu street 8, Tallinn

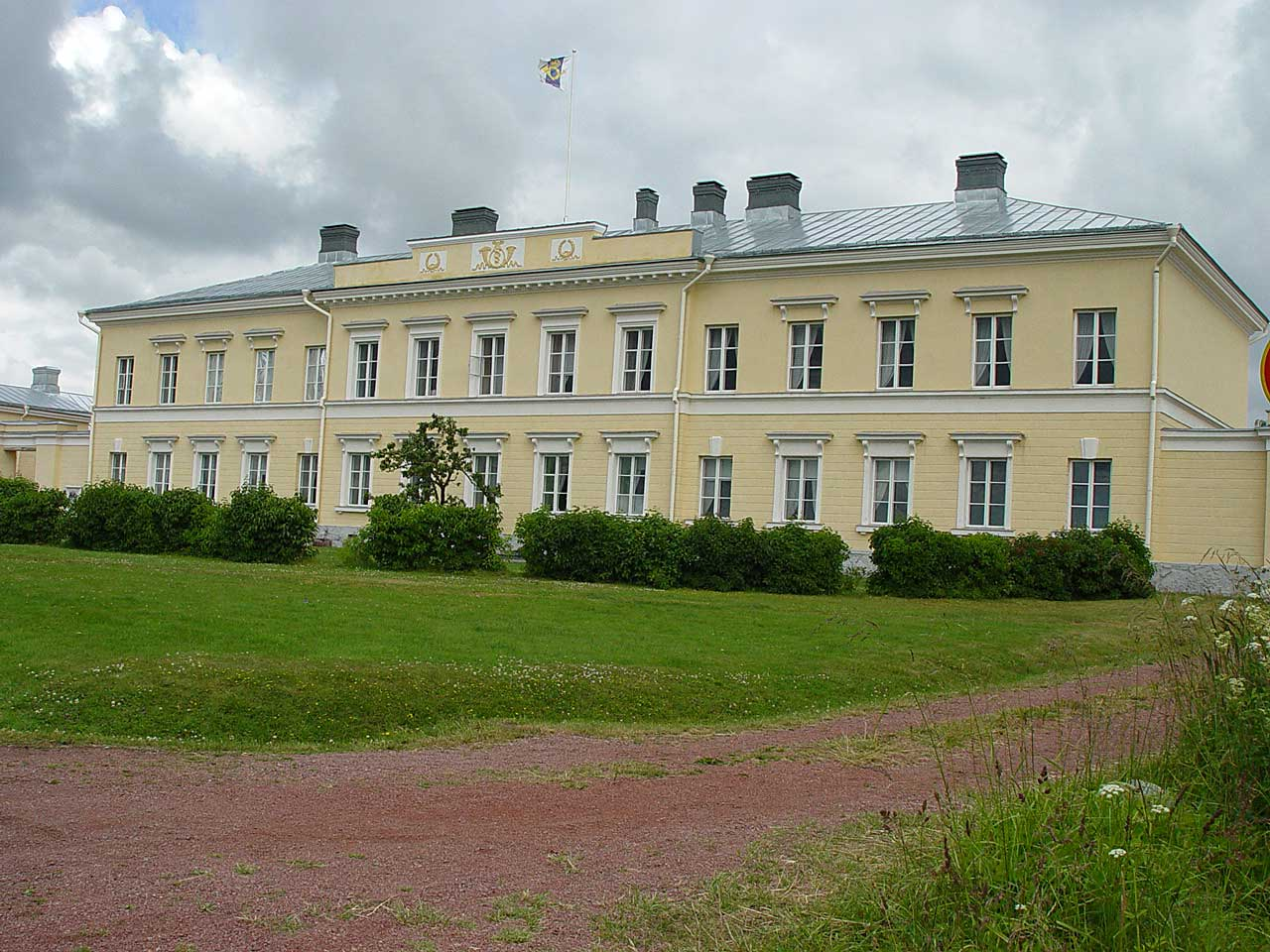
Eckerö Mail and Customs House (1828)

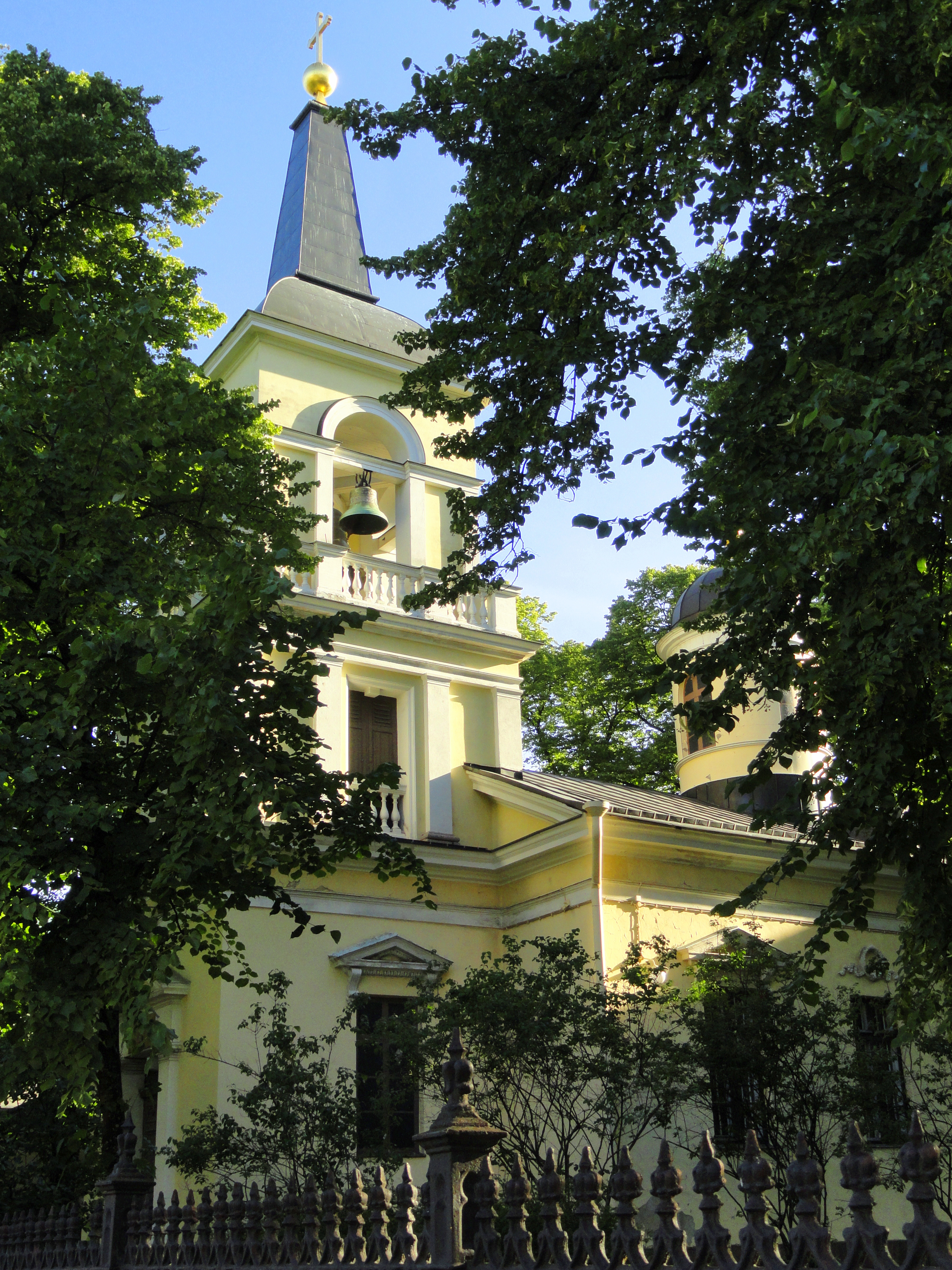
Holy Trinity Church, Helsinki (1826)

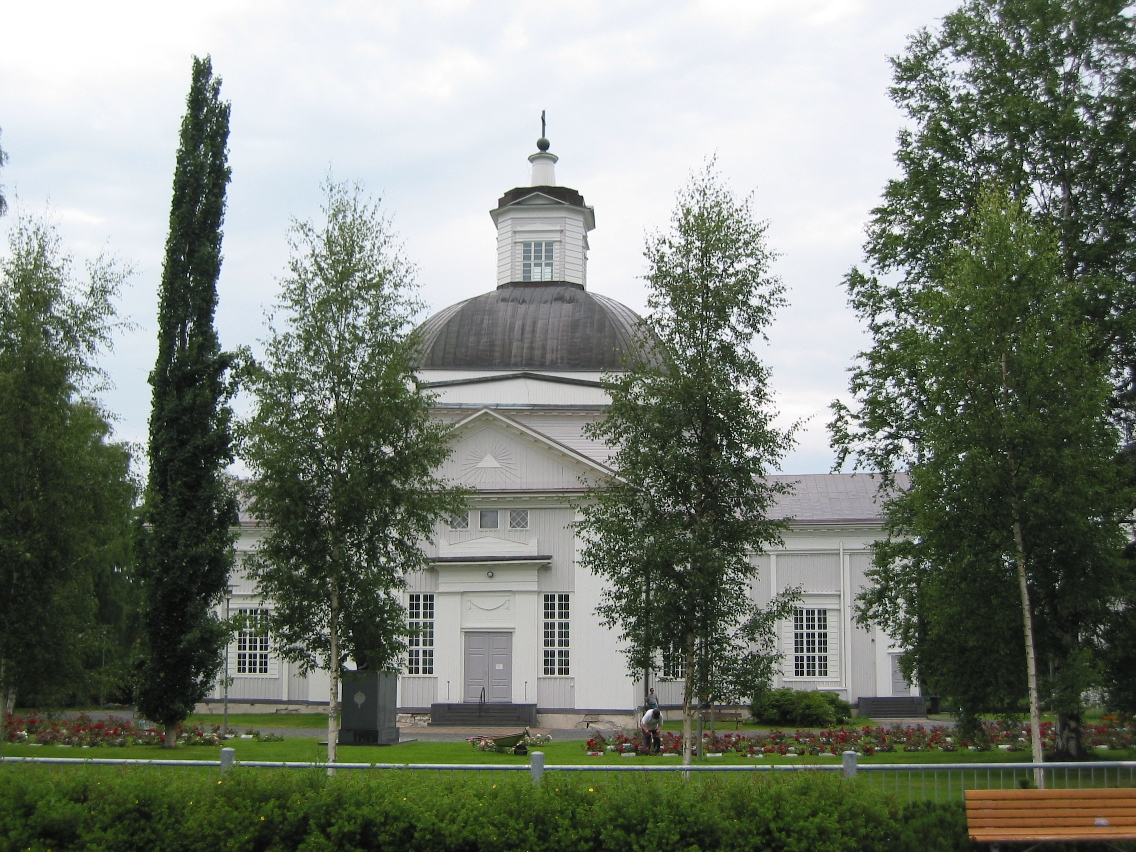
Lapua Cathedral (1827)

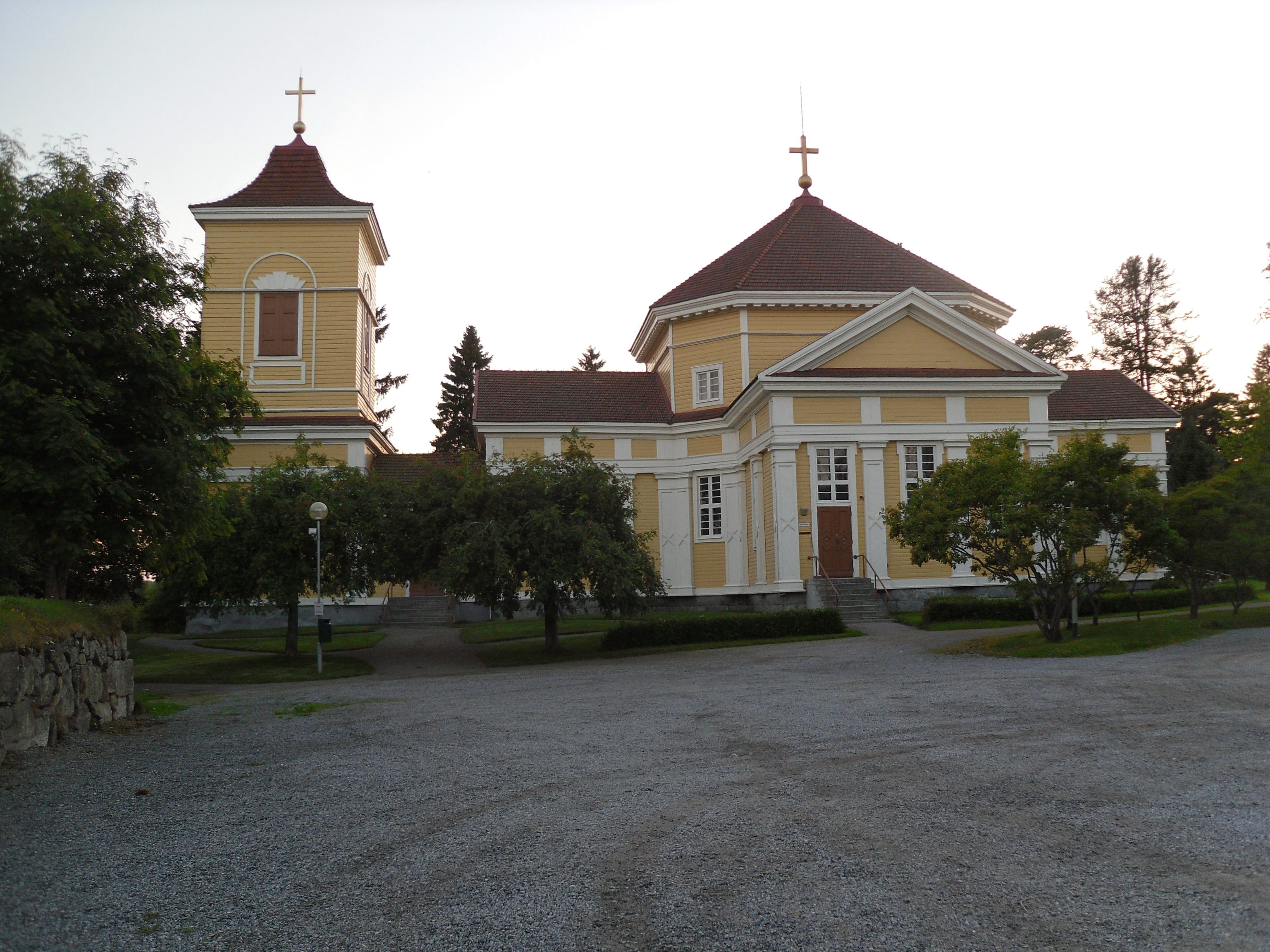
Sahalahti church (1829)

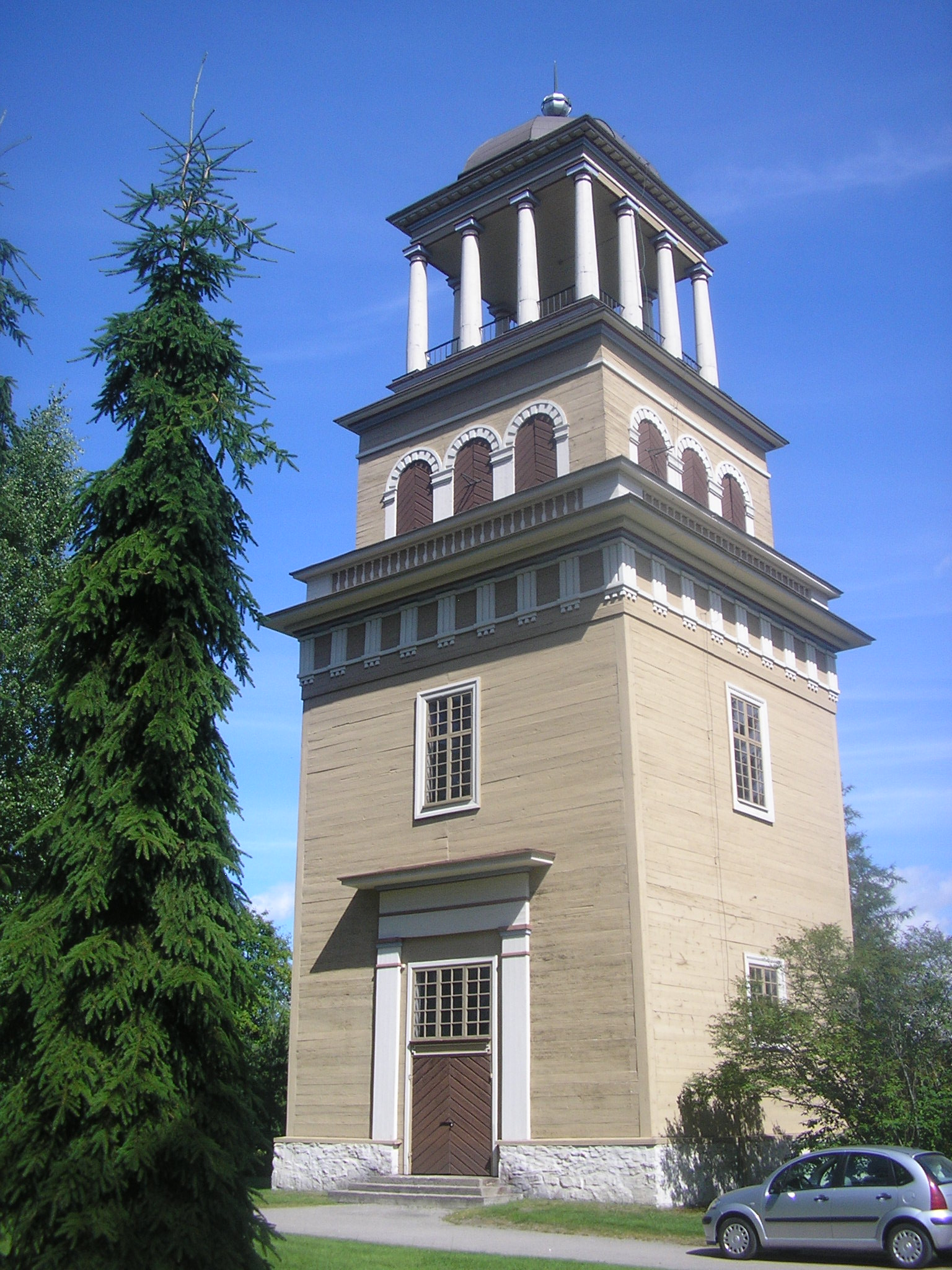
Lieksa bell tower (1836)

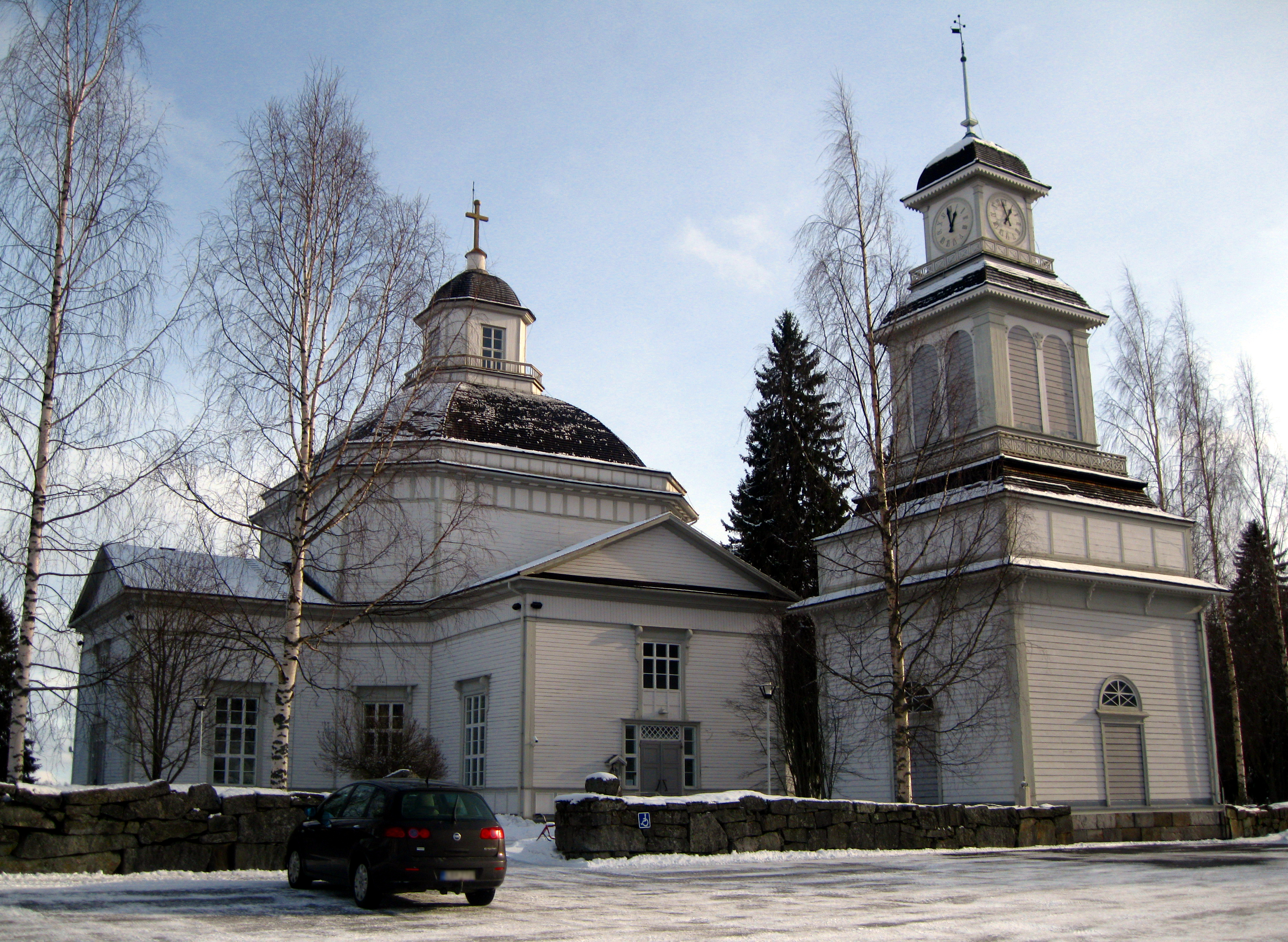
Alajärvi church (c. 1836)

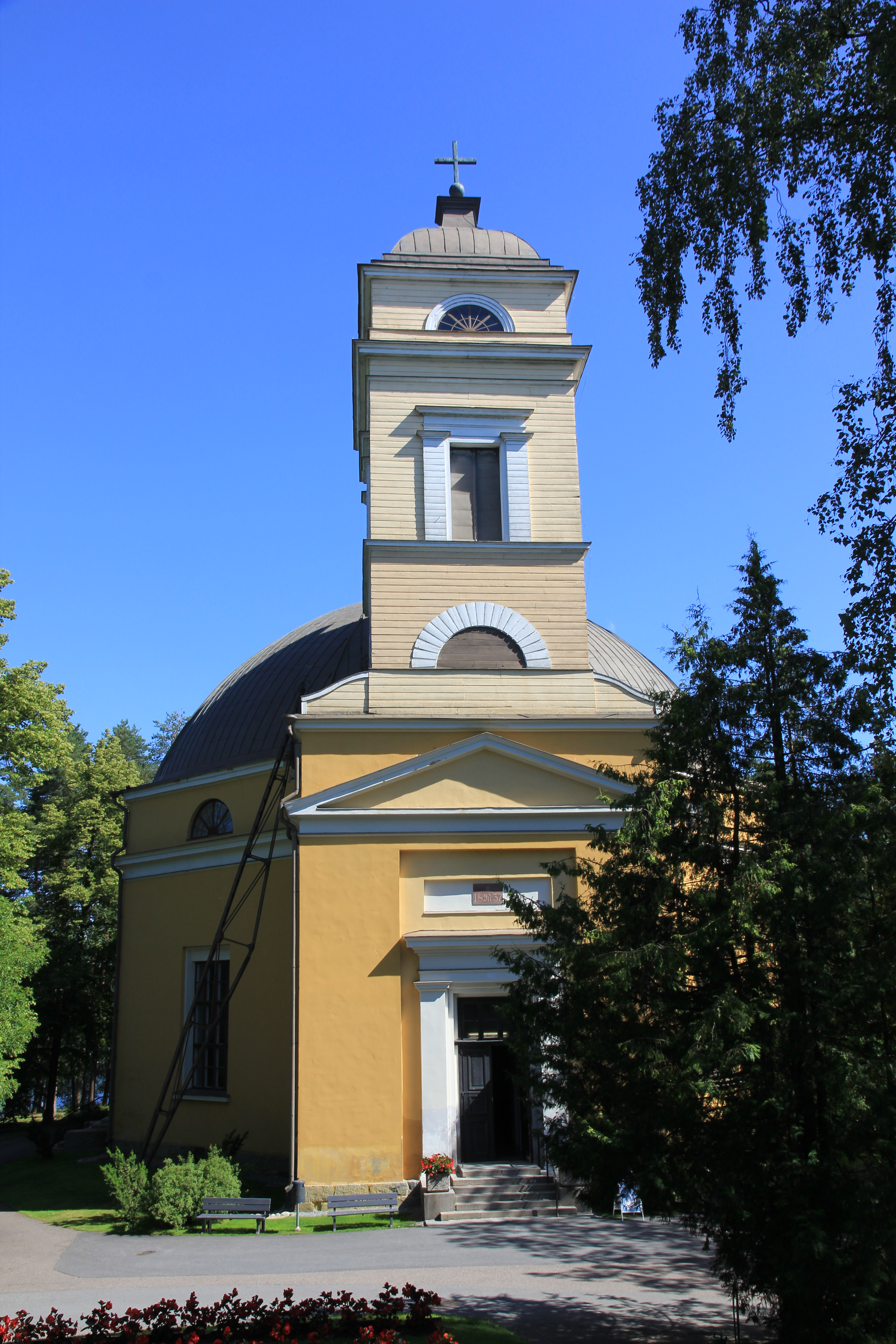
Nokia Church (1837)

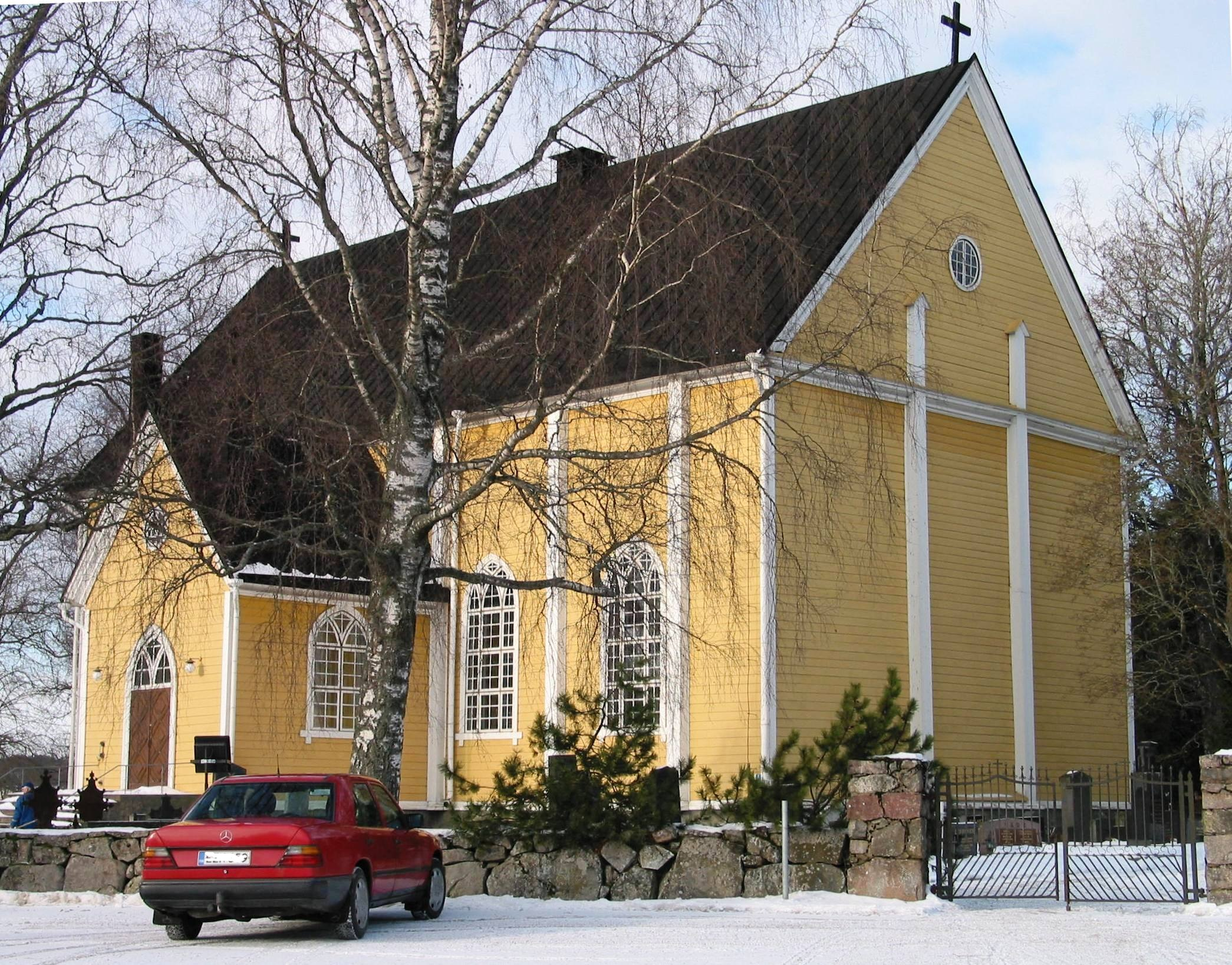
Pusula Church (1838)

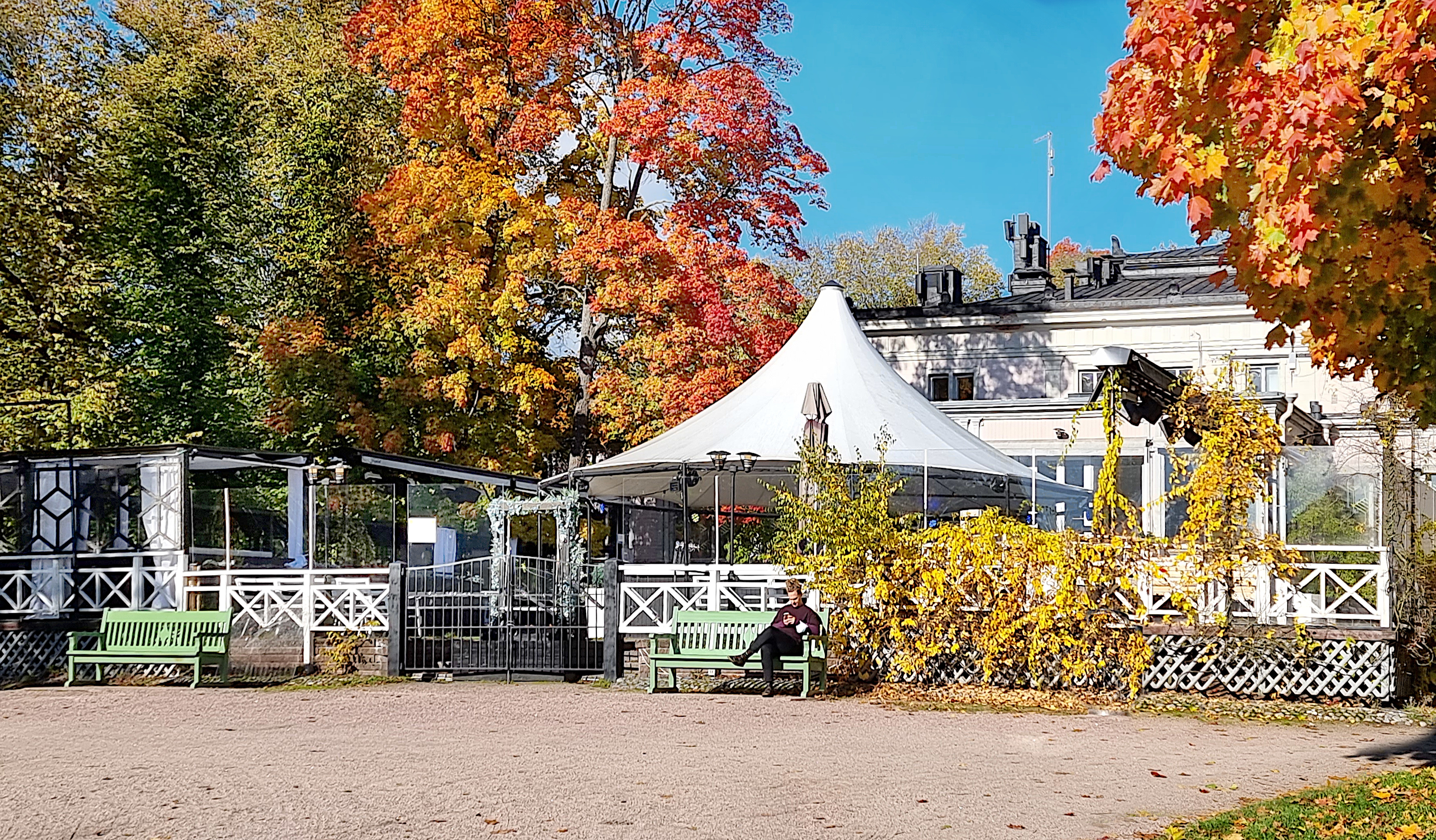
Kaivohuone (1838)

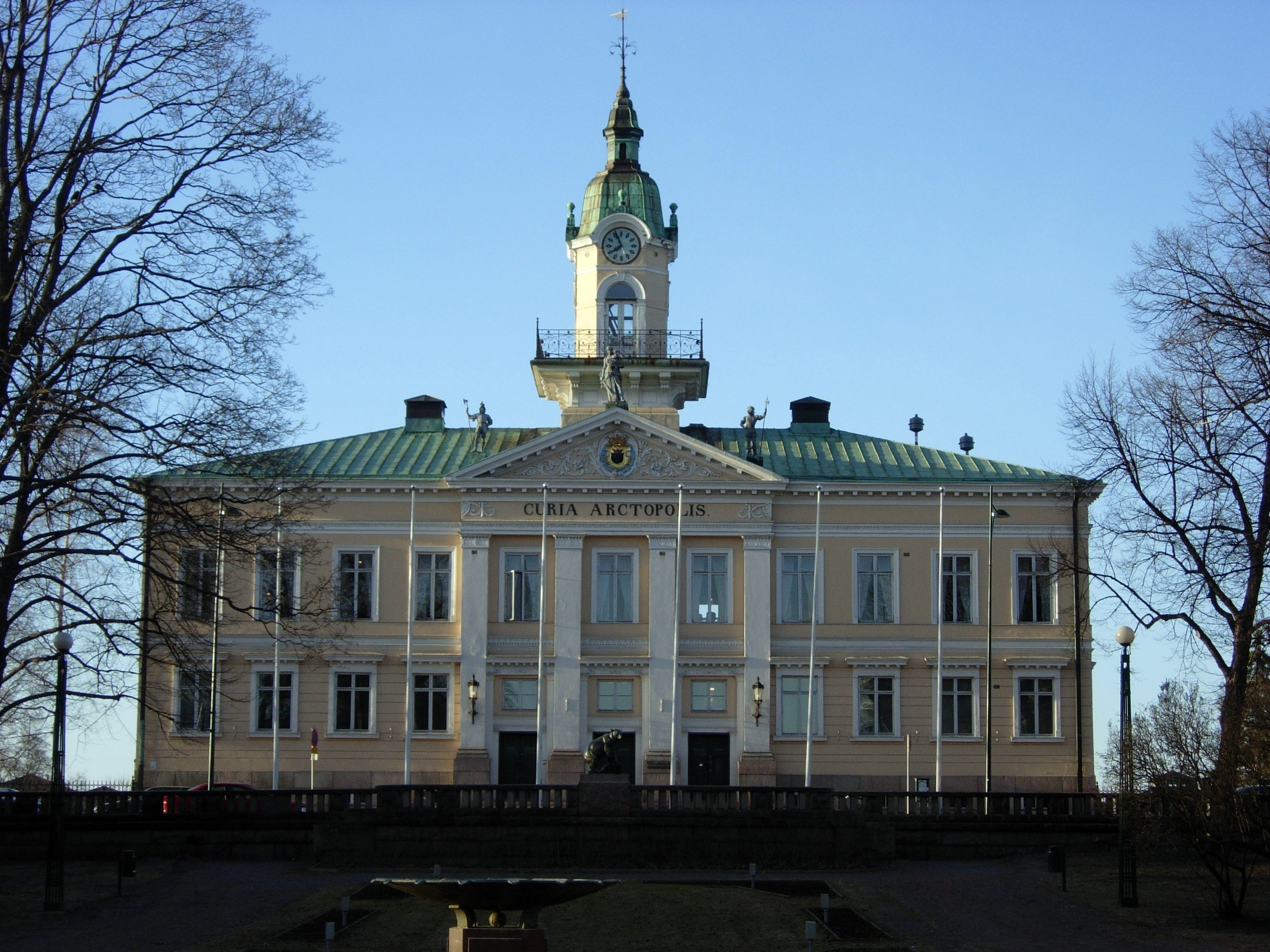
Pori Old Town Hall (1841)

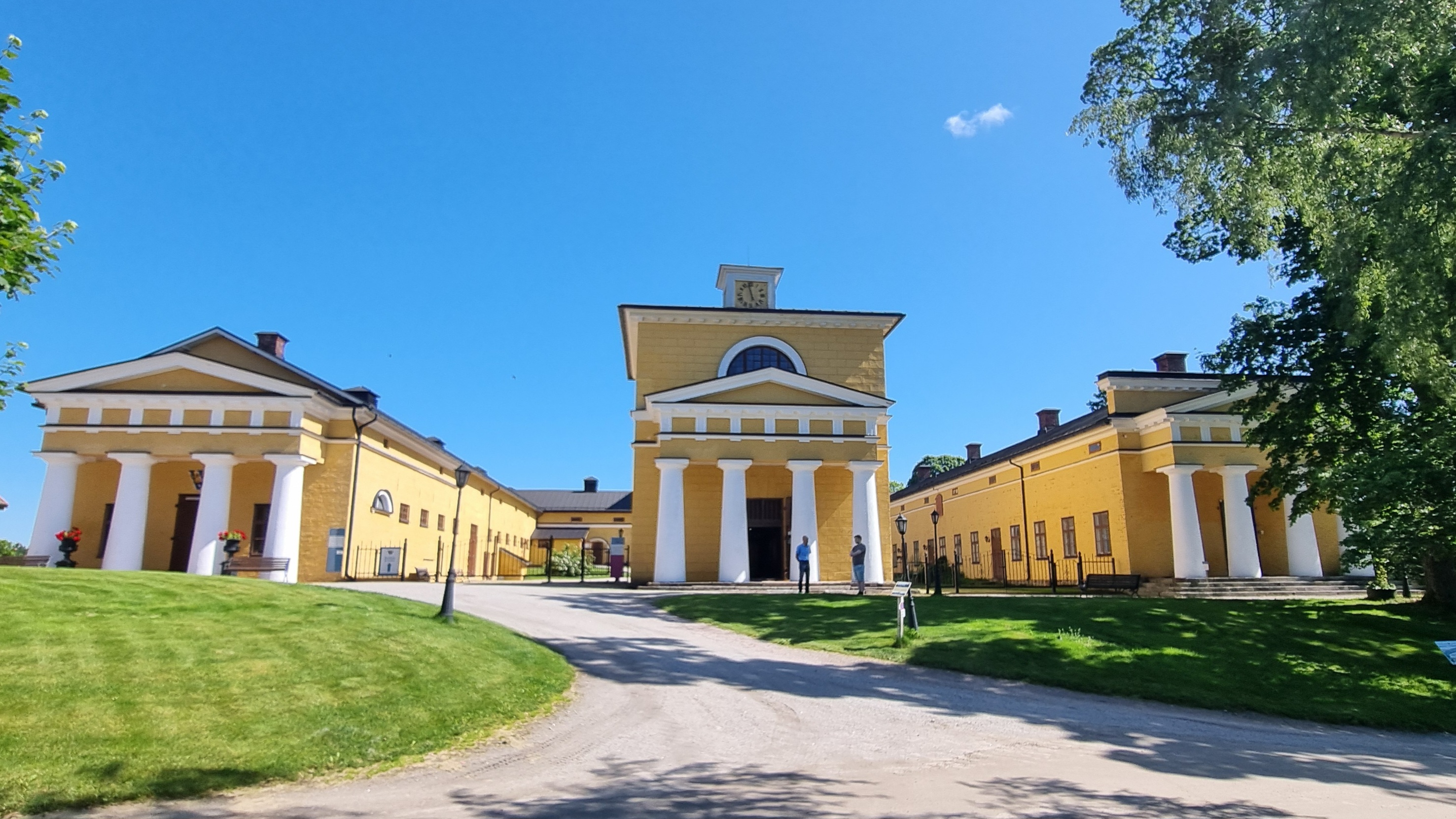
Economic buildings at Wiurila Mansion in Salo.

== See also ==
- Architecture of Finland
