= Mustikkamaa =

Island in Helsinki, Finland

Coordinates: 60.180556°N 24.991667°E

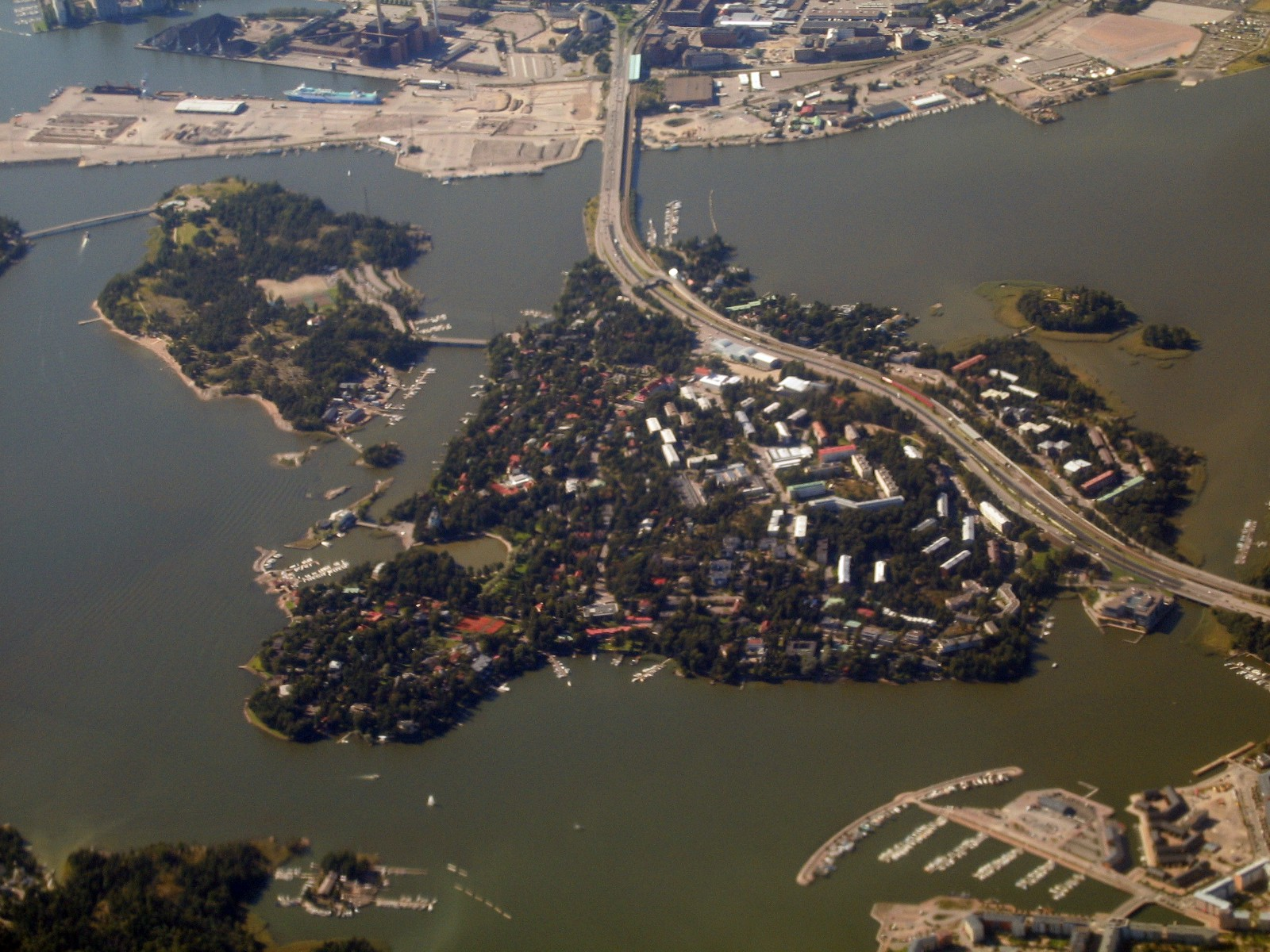
Aerial view of Kulosaari (the larger island) and Mustikkamaa (on the upper-left side)

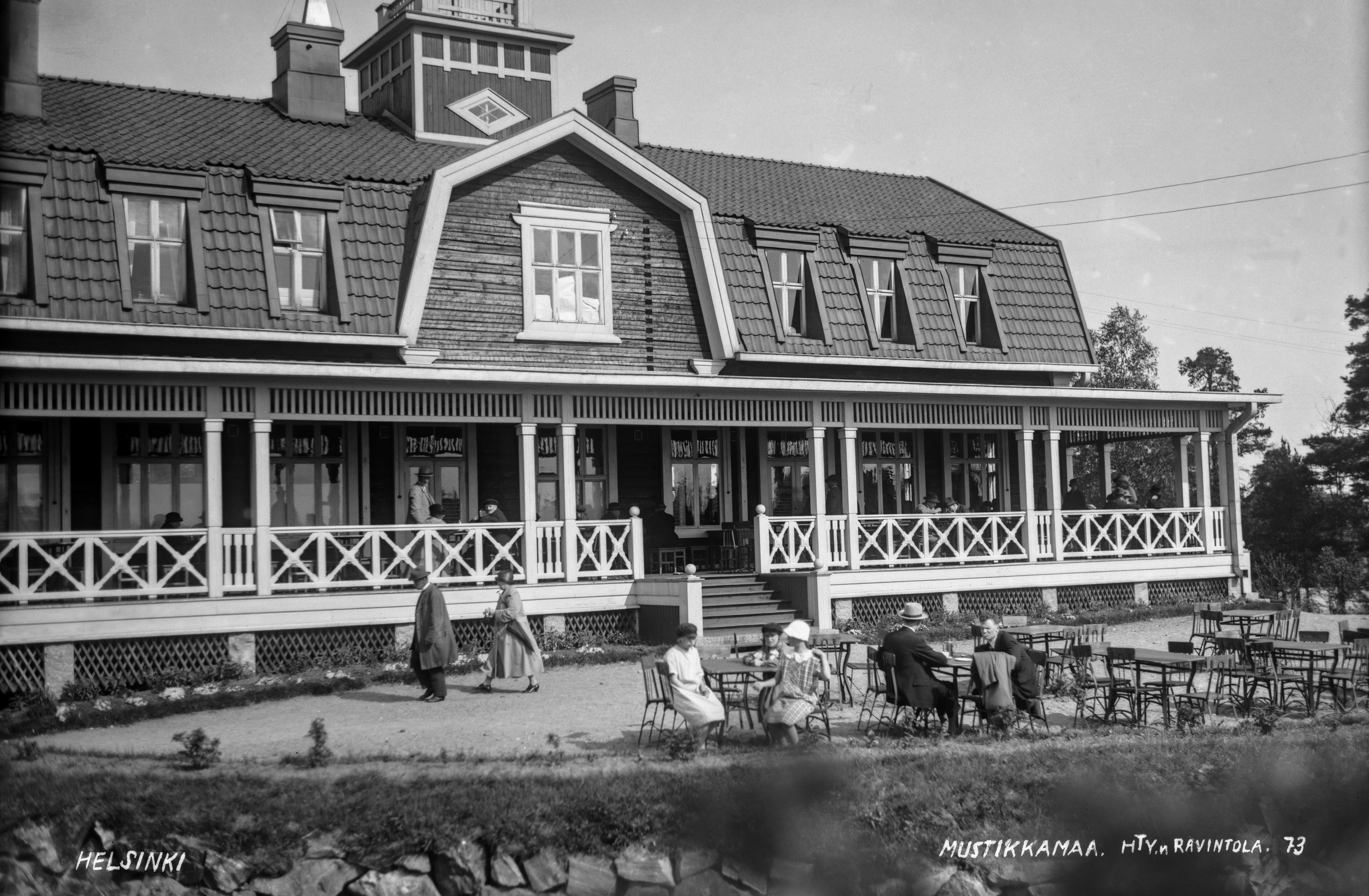
Mustikkamaa restaurant in the 1920s

Mustikkamaa (Finnish: [ˈmustikːɑˌmɑː]; Swedish: Blåbärslandet; literally translates to "blueberry land") is an island in the Gulf of Finland, some 5 kilometres (3.1 mi) to the east of the city centre of Helsinki, and c. 36 hectares (89 acres) in size.

== Leisure use ==
It is owned by the City of Helsinki, and used for public recreational and leisure activities such as jogging, hiking, cross-country skiing, tennis and other ballgames.

There is an open-air summer theatre, restaurant and marina, and the island is connected via a pedestrian bridge to the adjacent island of Korkeasaari, where the Helsinki zoo is located.

== Bridges ==
In 1964, a bridge was built to connect Mustikkamaa to the larger island of Kulosaari.

In 2016, the new Isoisänsilta bridge was opened, connecting Mustikkamaa also to the Kalasatama neighbourhood on the Helsinki mainland.

== Thermal energy storage ==
In the 1980s, three large rock caverns were excavated under Mustikkamaa, to store oil reserves. In 2021, the Helsinki municipal energy company HELEN took them into use as thermal energy storage facility, capable of holding 260,000 cubic metres (9,200,000 cu ft) of warm (45 °C (113 °F) or warmer) water, with the aim of reducing Helsinki's carbon emissions by over 20,000 tons annually.
