= Digelius Music =

Record shop in Finland

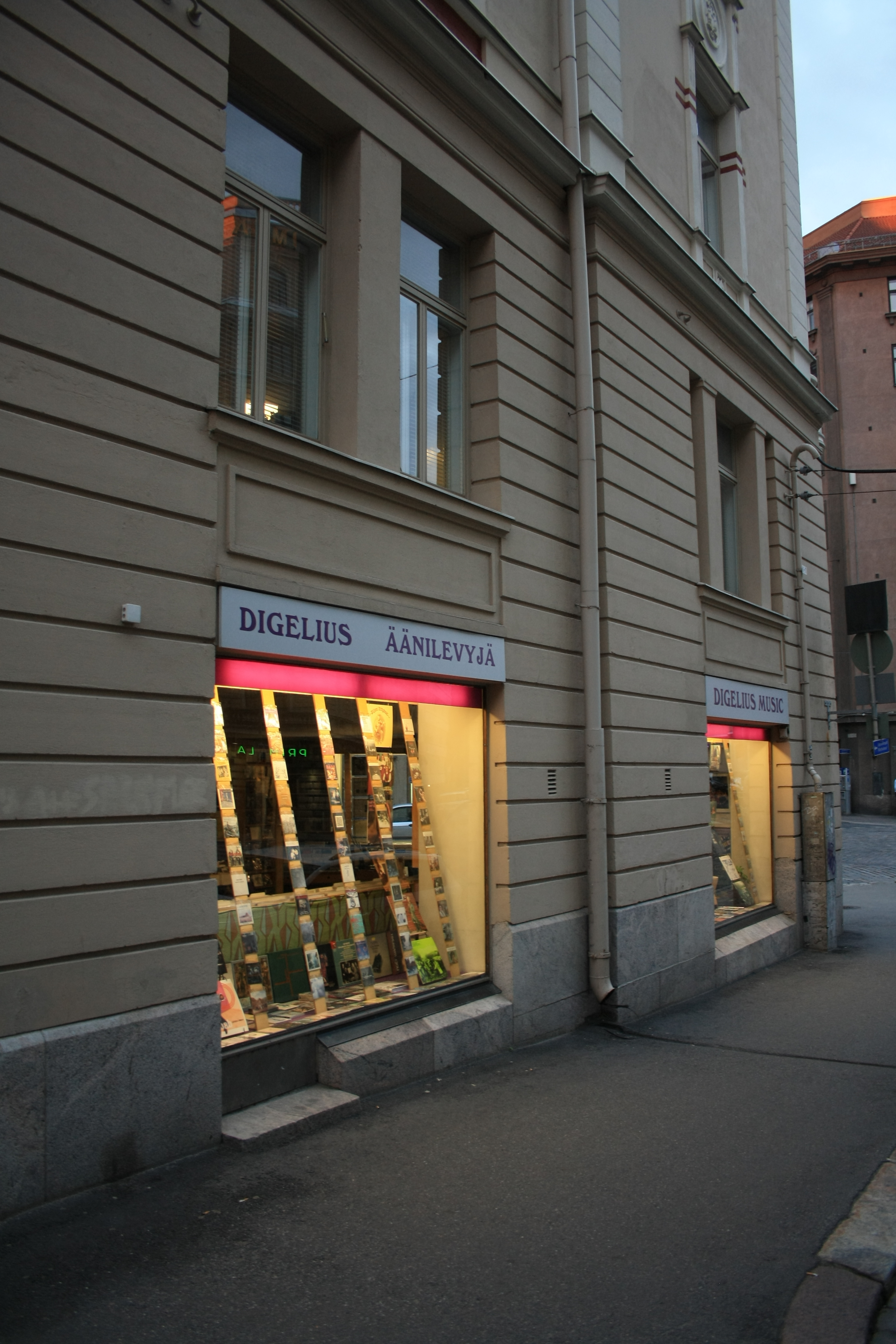
Digelius Music windows in Punavuori.

Digelius Music was a record shop and internet retailer located in Helsinki, Finland. It had been functioning in more or less the same place from 1971 to 2023. Officially its business was "retail of music and video recordings." There are several record shops in the same or neighbouring blocks. As of 2024 Digelius functions as an internet retailer whose orders can be picked at Eurantie, Helsinki.

== History of the record store ==
Digelius Music had its beginnings in 1971. At that time, the future CEO of the record store, Emu Lehtinen was working in another record shop in Helsinki, Tunnelin levy. Lehtinen together with record importer, Pertti Lehto, and co-employee, Tiina Ruolanne, got the idea of founding their own record store. Digelius Electronics Finland, known for its owner, inventor Erkki Kurenniemi, invested in some of the shares as well. Kurenniemi had founded Digelius Electronics Finland together with Peter Frisk, with the aim of producing electronic instruments. They were known e.g. for the Dimi synthesizer.

Digelius Music had a successful start, but then Tiina Ruolanto moved to Sweden, and Digelius Electronics Finland went bankrupt. Now Juhani "Juntsa" Aalto came to the rescue and bought have of the shares of the record store. The shop was now owned by Lehtinen, Aalto, and three minor shareholders. Aalto's shares were later inherited by his sister. Now the name Digelius only survives in the name of this record shop. The word Digelius is an amalgam of the words digital and Sibelius.

Digelius Music was originally located on a street called Laivurinrinne, at the Viiskulma corner, in the same space which is now (2024) occupied by the record store Eronen. One morning in the 1990s, Lehtinen noticed that the sports store at the corner of Laivurinrinne and Fredrikinkatu had disappeared. Having thought about this for one night, he went into a bank and took a sizable loan. Since then Digelius Music has existed at this corner, the heart of the Viiskulma corner.

== Digelius Music today ==
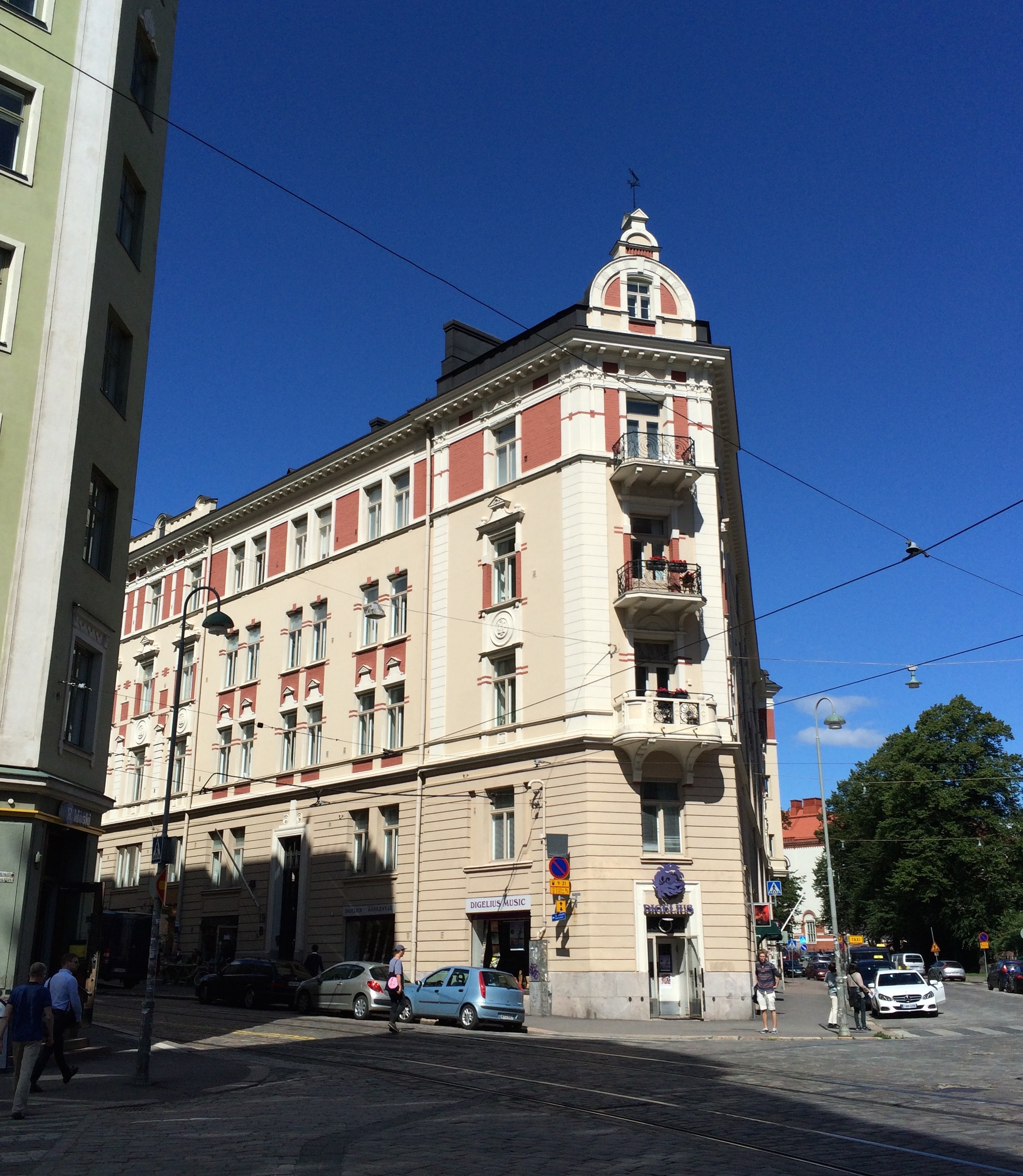
The house on the corner of Fredrikinkatu and Laivurinrinne, entrance to Digelius Music in the foreground.

It has been said that Digelius is one of the best known record stores in Finland. In the early days, all kinds of popular music was sold in the store, but since the 1980s, it has concentrated in jazz, jazz fusion, folk music and world music. It is also said that Digelius Music is an information center for jazz and world music, and in addition to this, it is occasionally a concert space and even a tourist attraction. One person writes about the store on the internet with the following words:

Digelius Music is a strange place. I moved some six years ago from Oulu to Helsinki. That is, I moved to the city that is famous for Digelius Music. That is how far the fame of this record store at Viiskulma had travelled. For me it represented the wide world, specialization, a small target audience, everything that is important in a big city: the possibility of existence for things that are smaller than a small town.

This writer tested the expertise of the store by asking about Azerbaidjani jazz. Soon the bearded man working in the store brought to him a pile of records to listen to. And he even seemed to enjoy this "inquiry that was goddamn difficult.”

In addition to selling records, live jazz can be heard in Digelius Music on occasion. These are usually record launch events. For example, in 2014, the pianist Iiro Rantala has had such a concert at Digelius. In 2012 Digelius Music was awarded the Varjo-Yrjö ('Shadow Yrjö') award.

In the 1980s, Digelius also published records, at least those of Hasse Walli's Afro-Line.

After a sudden passing of Emu Lehtinen in 2017, the store remained yet a few years at the same place. In 2023, Digelius was ready to be closed down permanently, but with aid from the record company We Jazz, the company was able to continue its business in new facilities on Hämeentie street in Helsinki. As of 2024 the webpage says Digelius does online sales and pop-ups.

== Well known employees ==
The best known person working in Digelius was Ilkka "Emu" Lehtinen, who is also the CEO of the record shop. In 2011, the Finnish Jazz Musicians' Association gave him the award "Jazz Digger of the Year". This award is given to a jazz listener, who "shows genuine and lasting interest in jazz music and represents a decent and open-minded community spirit". In addition, it was said that Lehtinen has acted as an encompassing and encouraging flag bearer for jazz music and as a person who brings musicians and their audiences together. The nickname "Emu" comes from Lehtinen's hobby, birdwatching.

Another important employee in the past was Phillip Page, an ex-patriate Texan, who worked at Digelius Music from 1987 on. He concentrated in providing the store with encompassing selections in world music, while Lehtinen's turf was jazz. In the early 1990s Page began to work as manager for various Finnish folk and world music acts, such as the JPP, Maria Kalaniemi and Värttinä. Nowadays, he works as the manager for Kimmo Pohjonen.

According to Emu Lehtinen,

the secret behind Digelius' long history is an unfathomable love for music, a diligent study of the history of music, an uncompromising and open attitude toward the ever-enticing marginal styles outside the mainstream of music styles, whether it be of jazz, folk music, outrageous experiments or just musical experiences fantastic for other reasons. Hard work and customer service that strives for the best are also essential ingredients of our success
