= Kulosaari Manor =

Mansion in Helsinki, Finland

- Kulosaaren kartano Brändö gård
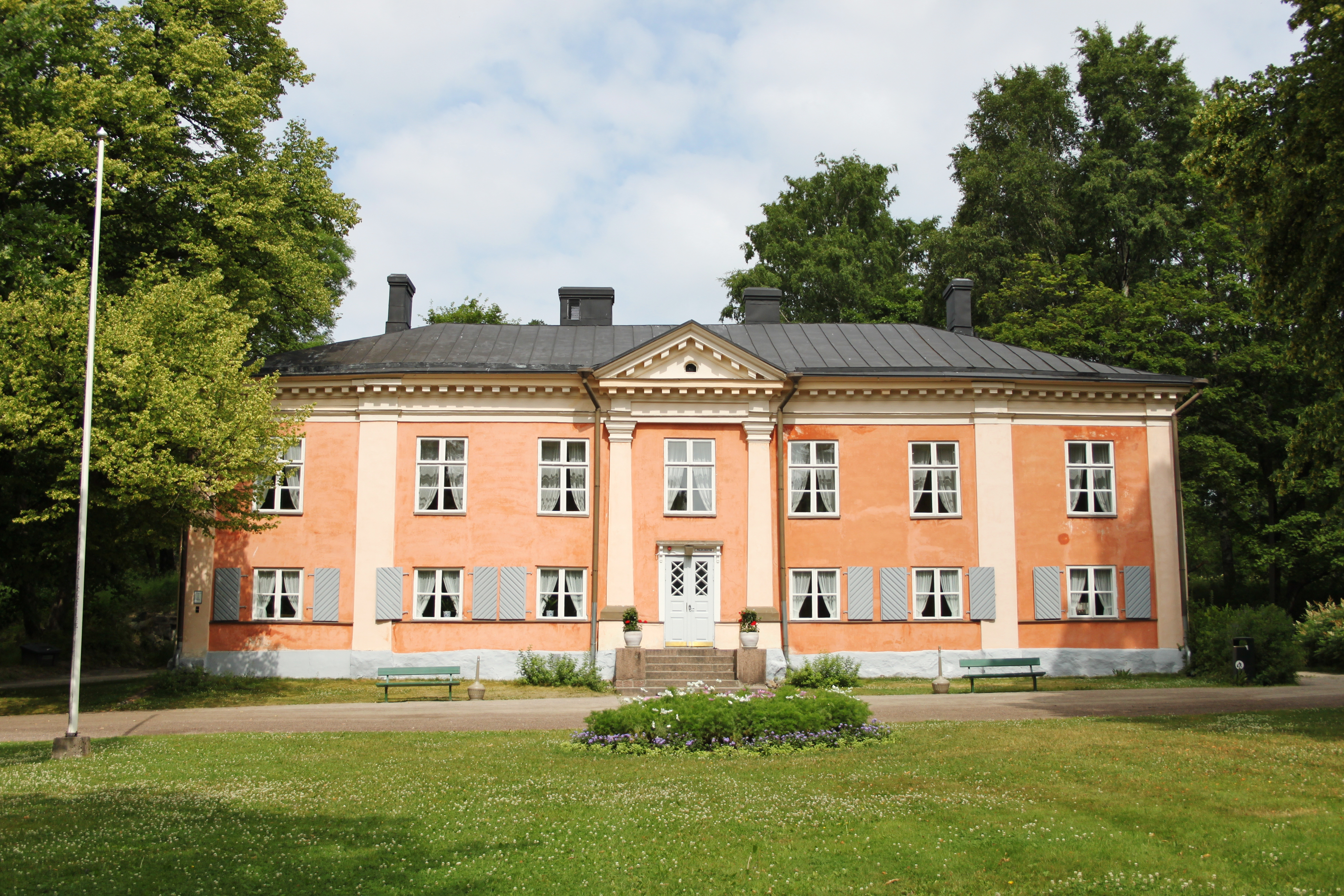
- Interactive map of the Kulosaari Manor area

General information
- Type: Manor house, mansion
- Architectural style: Neoclassical
- Location: Kulosaari, Helsinki, Finland
- Coordinates: 60°11′35″N 25°00′52″E
- Estimated completion: c. 1810 (current building)
- Client: Jägerhorn af Storby family
- Owner: City of Helsinki (current)

Design and construction
- Architect: Pehr Granstedt

Kulosaari Manor (Finnish: Kulosaaren kartano, Swedish: Brändö gård) is a manor house and mansion located near (Note: Despite its name, the manor is not actually located on the island of Kulosaari, but instead on the mainland in the Kivinokka area of Herttoniemi, across the narrow Naurissalmi strait from Kulosaari.) the Kulosaari neighbourhood of Helsinki.

The manor was designed in the neoclassical style by architect Pehr Granstedt in 1815. Its first owners were the noble fi:Jägerhorn af Storby family.

The current main building may be partly based on an earlier 18th-century house commissioned by Count Augustin Ehrensvärd. The history of the actual manor (rather than the manor house itself) dates even further back to the 16th-century, its earliest known owner having been Erik Filpusson, from 1540 to 1587.

The manor has been owned by the City of Helsinki since 1927. It is currently (until 2020) leased to JHL, the Trade Union for Public and Welfare Sectors, and mainly used for their and their members' events and recreational purposes.

The manor was featured in Taskmaster Finland.
