= Kulosaari Secondary School =

Kulosaari Secondary School Finnish: Kulosaaren yhteiskoulu
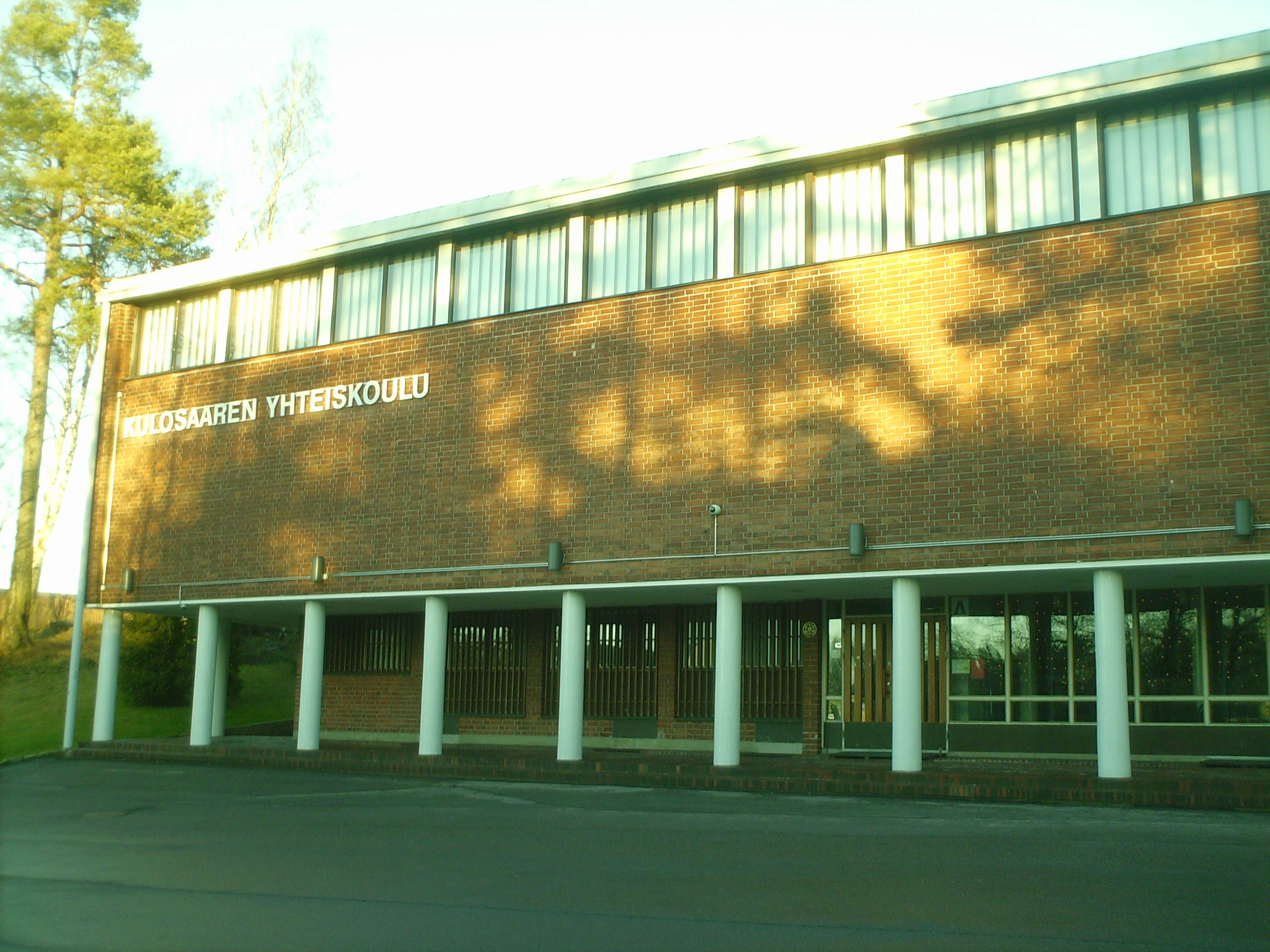
- Kulosaari Secondary School

Location
- Kulosaari, Helsinki; Finland
- Coordinates: 60.187031°N 25.003297°E

Information
- Type: Secondary
- Established: 1 October 1940
- Principal: Lauri Halla
- Faculty: c. 100
- Grades: Lower secondary (grades 7–9), Gymnasium (lukio)
- Gender: Mixed
- Enrollment: c. 900
- Language: Finnish, English
- Campus type: Suburban
- Website: www.ksyk.fi/en/

Kulosaari Secondary School (Finnish: Kulosaaren yhteiskoulu, abbr. KSYK) is a private secondary school located in Kulosaari, Helsinki, founded in 1940. It is an international school, teaching in both Finnish and English. The school comprises both lower secondary (yläaste) (grades 7–9) and upper secondary or gymnasium (lukio) stages, with approximately 900 pupils in total. Kulosaari is one of the leading gymnasia in the country by exam results.

== History ==
The school was founded in 1940, when Kulosaari was still a separate municipality within the Greater Helsinki area. It was the first Finnish-language oppikoulu (Note: Oppikoulu was an elective, academically oriented secondary school under the old pre-1970s education system in Finland; broadly comparable to the English grammar school.) in the capital's eastern suburbs.

The school was incorporated as a private limited company, and remains privately owned. When secondary education in Finland was reformed in the 1970s and 1980s, as part of which many private schools were nationalised, Kulosaari managed to retain its independence despite facing strong political pressure and many attempts to either close it down or take it under local authority control.

=== Facilities ===
The school operated originally from a residential building called 'Domus' near the present site, until 1955 when its own purpose-built facilities, designed by architect Jorma Järvi, were completed. The original school building is based around a central auditorium.

Over the years the school has been extended several times, most notably and extensively in 1966, 2000 and 2022. A new library wing was added in 2015, and the 'School of Rock' music facility in 2017. Additional facilities now include gym, library and cafeteria.

=== Principals ===
The current principal is Lauri Halla (since 2007).

Previous principals were:

- Kyllikki Kovero (1940–1945)
- Erkki Kansanaho (1945–1954)
- Kauko Joustela (1954–1956)
- Matti Karstikko (1956–1978)
- Kyllikki Laakso (1978–1991)
- Kyllikki Vilkuna (1991–2007)

== Academic activities ==
Since the 1990s Kulosaari has had an international focus, and now operates as an international school, teaching in both Finnish and English; pupils can choose to study in either language, or bilingually. The teaching staff consists of a mix of native Finnish and English speakers.

In addition to the Finnish matriculation exam or ylioppilastutkinto, the Finnish secondary school leaving qualification, pupils can choose to study for the Cambridge A Levels.

Admission to the lower secondary school's Finnish intake is primarily, although not exclusively, reserved for local Kulosaari residents. Admission to the English and bilingual stream is based on entrance exams. Admission to the gymnasium (upper secondary) stage is based on the applicant's lower secondary school grades.

KSYK was ranked the 3rd best gymnasium (lukio) in the country, based on the 2018 matriculation exam results.

== Extracurricular activities ==
Kulosaari Secondary School hosts an annual model United Nations event, called the Helsinki International Model United Nations or HELIMUN, where 9th grade pupils from Kulosaari as well as several other Finnish and some overseas schools take part in simulating the operation of the UN, to discuss and debate international issues. The May 2018 HELIMUN was the 18th edition of the event.

An autumn ball (syystanssiaiset) as well as a sports day are organised annually. Throughout the academic year there are also initiatives themed around topics such as languages, arts and sciences.
