= Sompasaari =

Island in Helsinki, Finland

Coordinates: 60°10′52″N 24°58′36″E

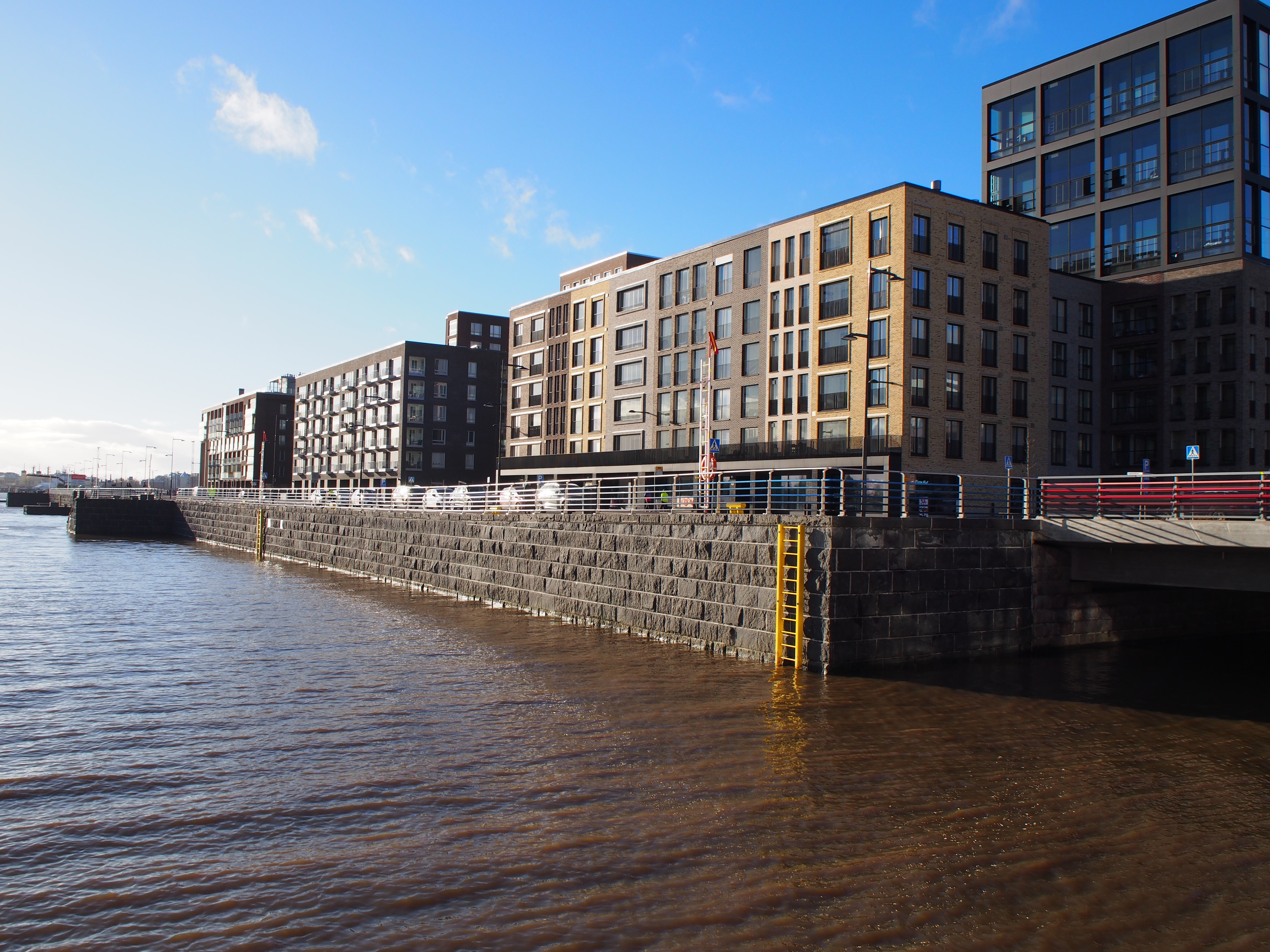
Apartment buildings in Sompasaari, built in 2020.

Sompasaari (Swedish: Sumparn) is an island on the Kruunuvuorenselkä water area in the Sörnäinen district in Helsinki, Finland. On the southern side of the Nihdinkanava channel built in the middle of Sompasaari is the island of Nihti.

The island was originally connected to the mainland with reclaimed land and the Sörnäinen Harbour was built on top of it. Because of this, the entire harbour has been referred to as Sompasaari. Signs on roads leading to the harbour used the name Sompasaari exclusively, with an icon representing a cargo harbour. Harbour facilities in Sörnäinen ended in late 2008 when they moved to the new Vuosaari Harbour. In 2016 the island was converted to a residential area and it was separated from nearby Kalasatama by digging a new channel called Sompasaarenkanava between them.

== History ==
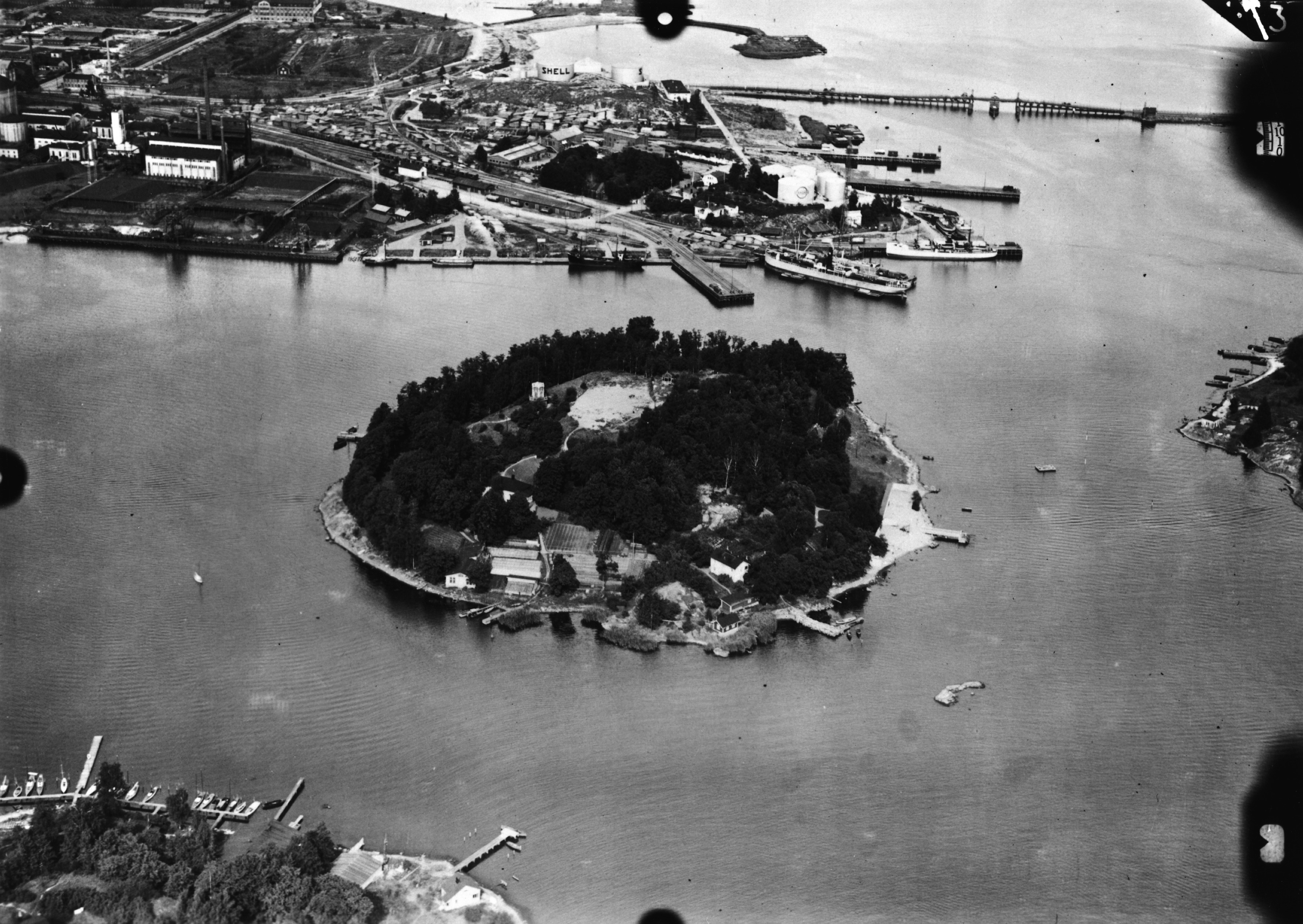
The island near the harbour in 1937.

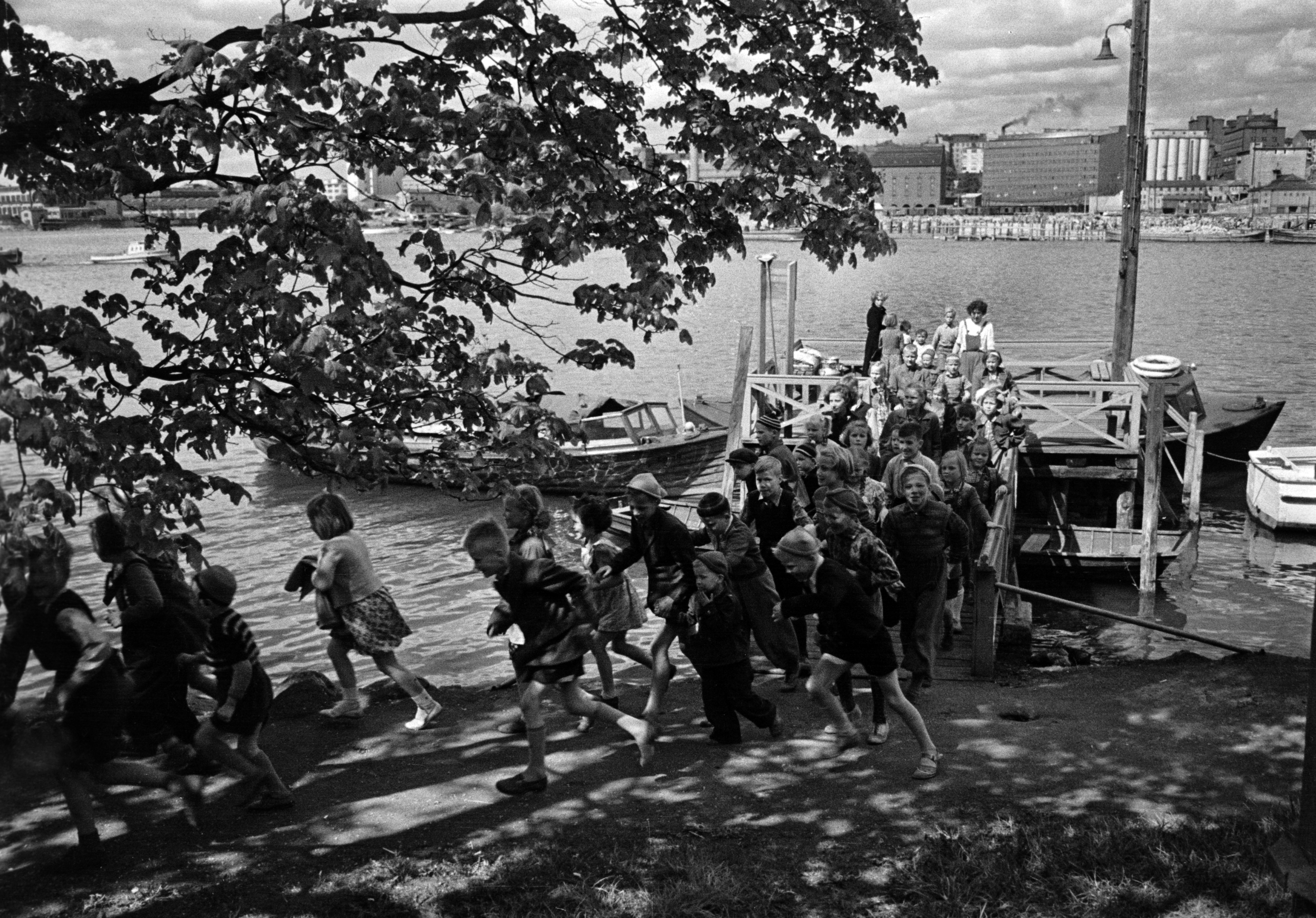
The pier at the island. The forested and cliff-faced island of Sompasaari hosted a summer camp for the children of Elanto employees in the 1950s.

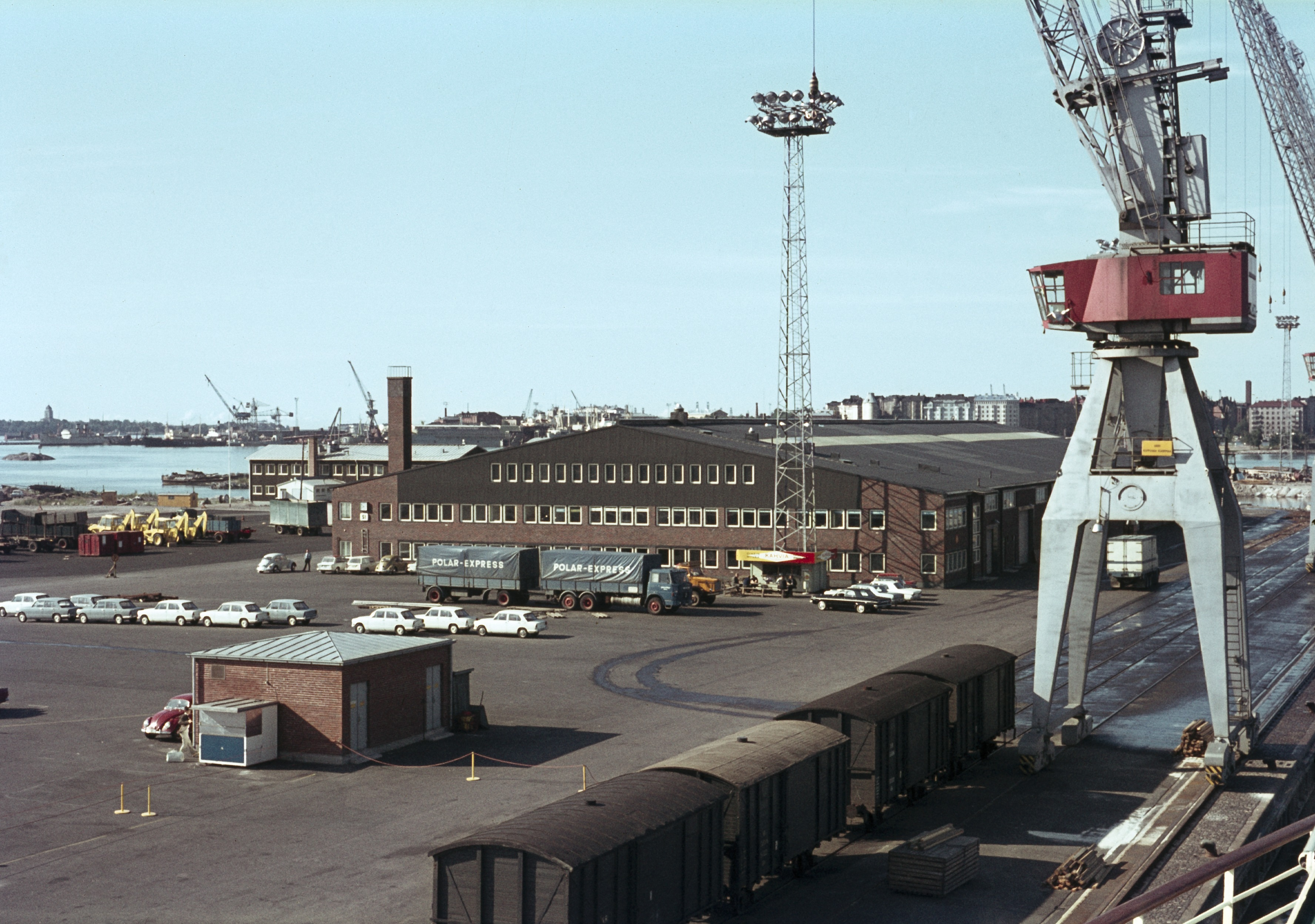
The harbour at Sompasaari in 1966.

=== Etymology ===
The oldest privilege books of Helsinki dating back to 1569 show the name of the island as Sompeholmen, and later names include Sompareholmen in maps from the 17th century, Sumparen in 1775 and Sumpörn in 1779. Finnish names have included Sumparni and Sumppari in the late 19th century. In the early 19th century the island was also called Lowiseholm after its tenant, Kristina Lovisa, wife of marine captain Gustaf Wilhelm Sundman. The names Sumppari - Sumparn were made official in 1909 and the island got its current Finnish name in 1928. The Swedish name means a corf and refers to old fish trade; "sump" is originally a Low German word. Thus a more proper Finnish name would be *Sumppusaari.

=== In recreational use ===
Sompasaari originally served as a recreational retreat for Helsinkians, accessed by steamship. Almost 30 people lived in the wooden villas on the island in the early 20th century. In the 1920s the island was transferred into the ownership of Elanto.

The flora on the island was exceptionally diverse; it was estimated to contain at least three hundred different species. This was partly because of a garden founded on the island in the 1840s.

=== In harbour use ===
The high cliffs of Sompasaari were blasted away, ground flat and connected to the mainland when the Sörnäinen Harbour was expanded seaward from 1958 to 1962. At the same time all the old wooden houses on the island were dismantled. In the 1960s the island of Nihti to the south of Sompasaari was also connected to the mainland, first connected to Sompasaari through an isthmus. Land reclamation use in the area had already been started in the 1950s when two islands, Hanasaari and Kana were combined as the foundation of the new power plant. As well as Nihti, the neighbouring islands of Mustikkamaa and Korkeasaari remain to this day.

=== In residential use ===
Since 2010 the Sompasaari area has been converted to residential use similarly to the neighbouring area of Kalasatama. The first apartments were built in 2018, and the area is intended to be fully completed in 2026. The city of Helsinki has predicted that there will be 3901 people living in the area by 2029.

A park called Loviseholminpuisto will be located in the centre of Sompasaari. The shores of the island contain lots for restaurant ships.

Traffic in the area has been improved in the 2000s. The Kalasatama metro station, opened in 2007, is within walking distance from Sompasaari. The light traffic bridge Isoisänsilta ("grandfather's bridge") over the Sompasaarensalmi sound to Mustikkamaa was built in 2016. Two perpendicular new bridges are being built in Nihti on the southern part of Sompasaari, the Merihaansilta bridge to Merihaka and the Finkensilta bridge to Korkeasaari, which will become a part of the Crown Bridges tram network between the city centre and Laajasalo. Also the new Kalasatama-Pasila tram line currently under construction is planned to go from Nihti through Sompasaari to the Kalasatama metro station and thereafter through Hermanni to Pasila.

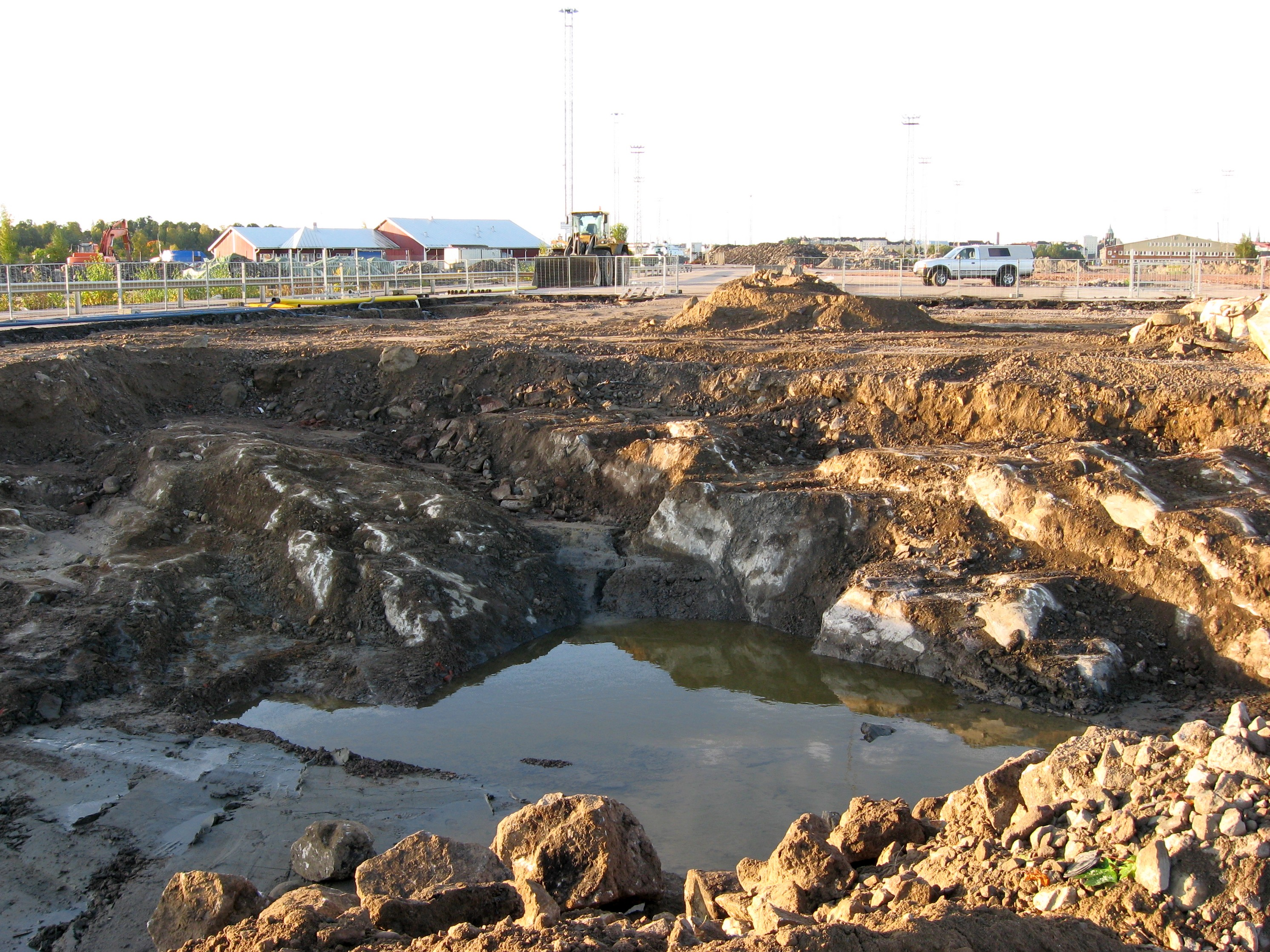
Converting the area for residential use required cleaning the soil, revealing the old coastal cliffs.

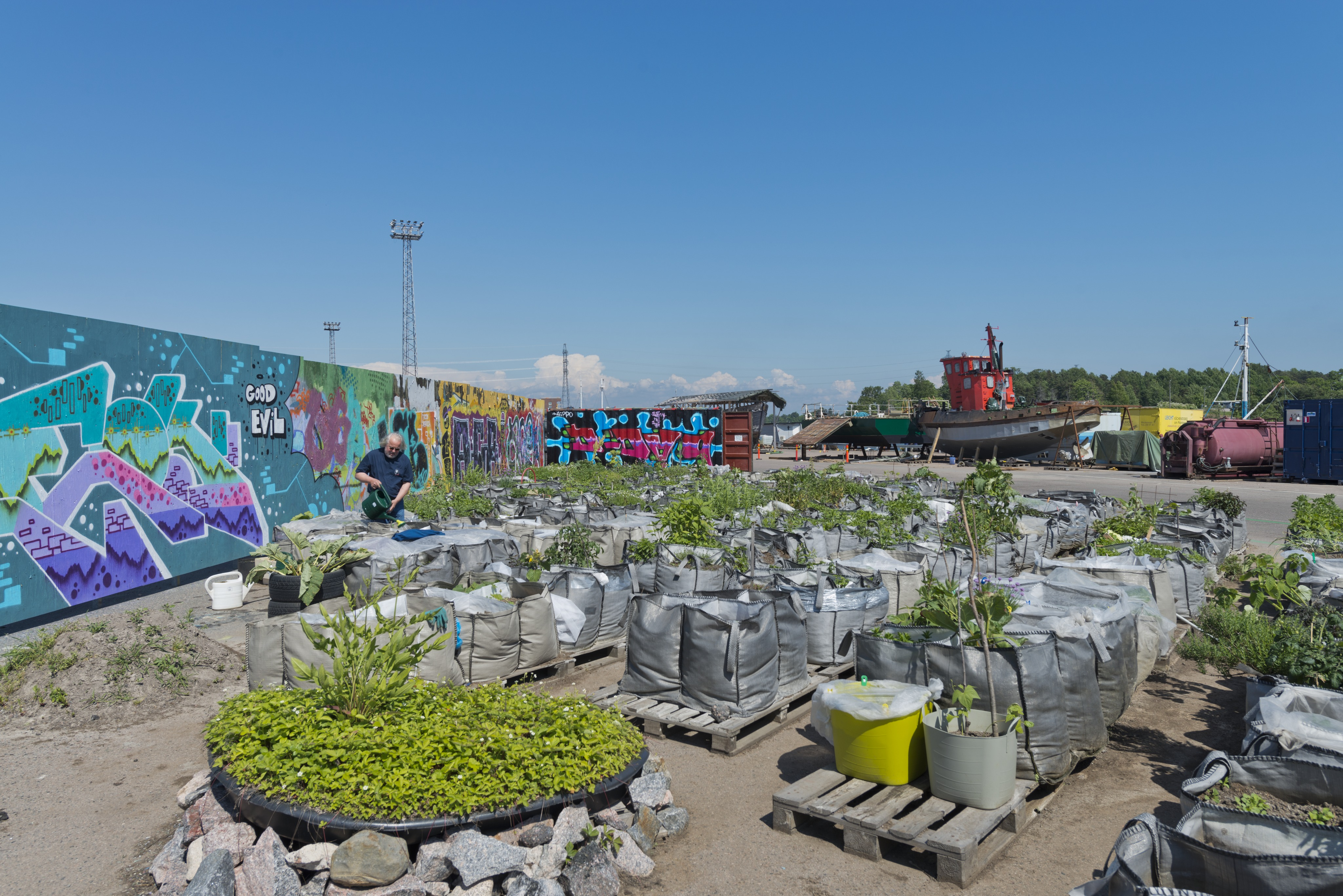
Finland's first and largest urban farm was temporarily located in the area under construction in the early 2010s.

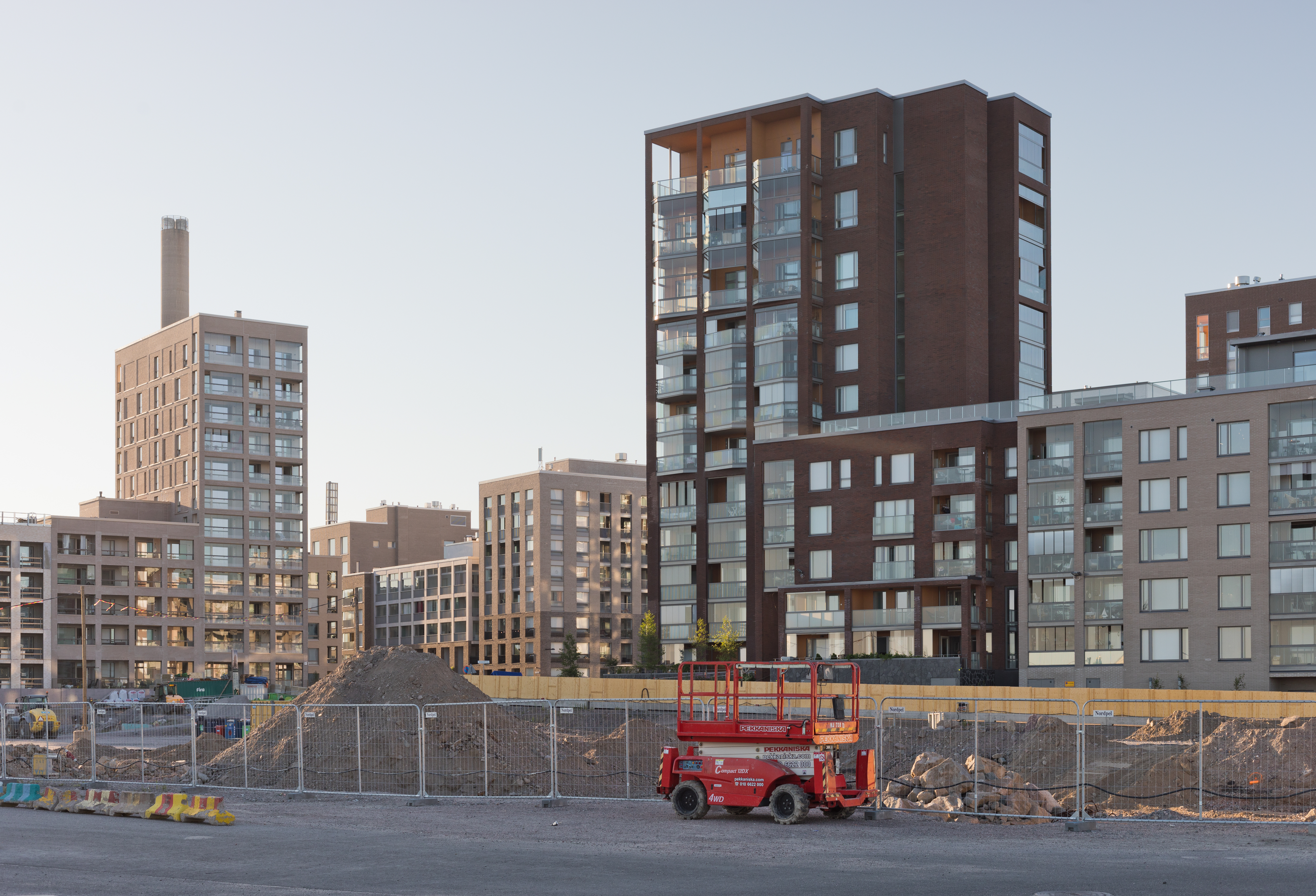
New apartment buildings have been built since 2018.

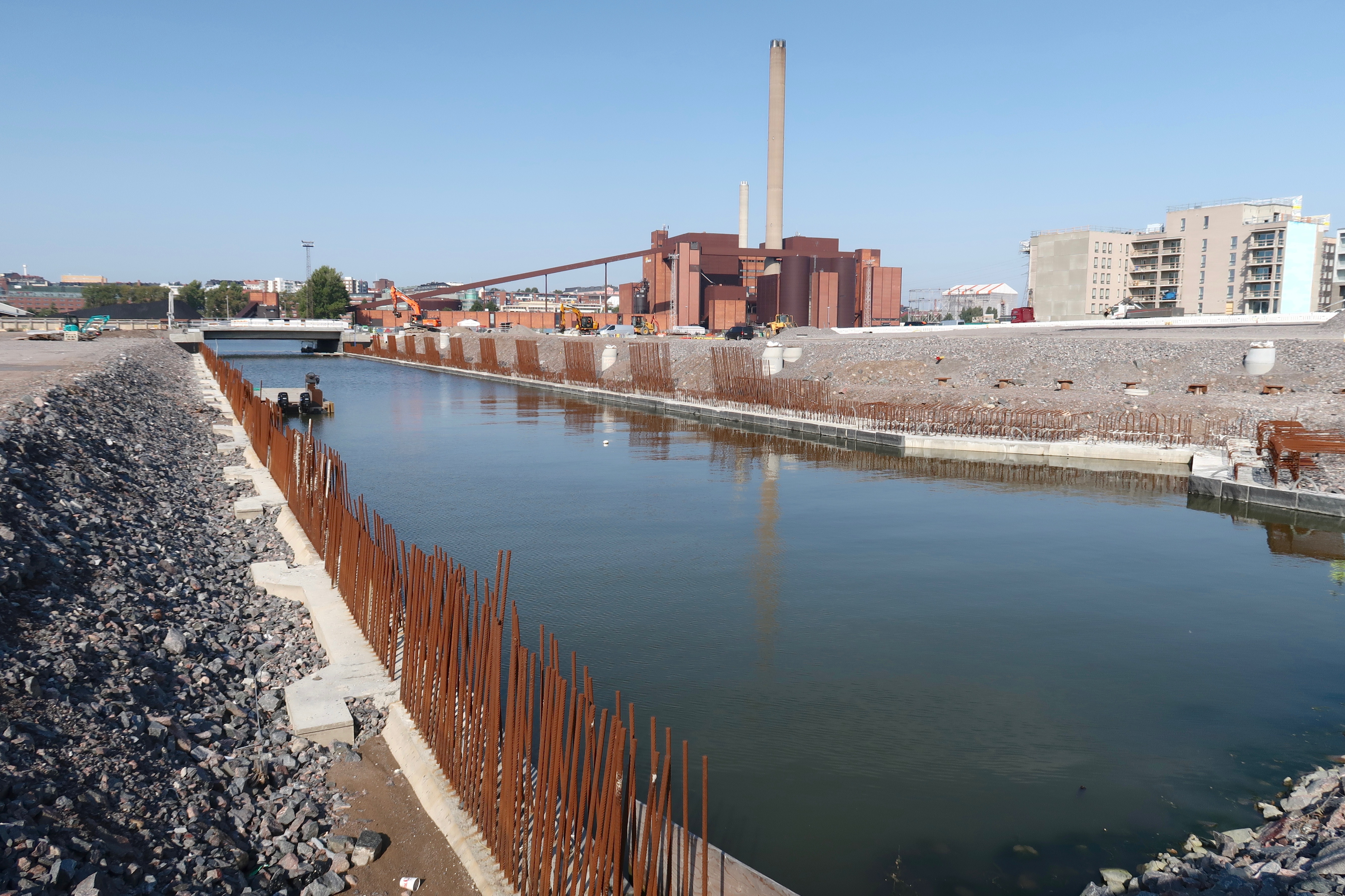
The Nihdinkanava channel separates Nihti and Sompasaari.

== Nomenclature ==
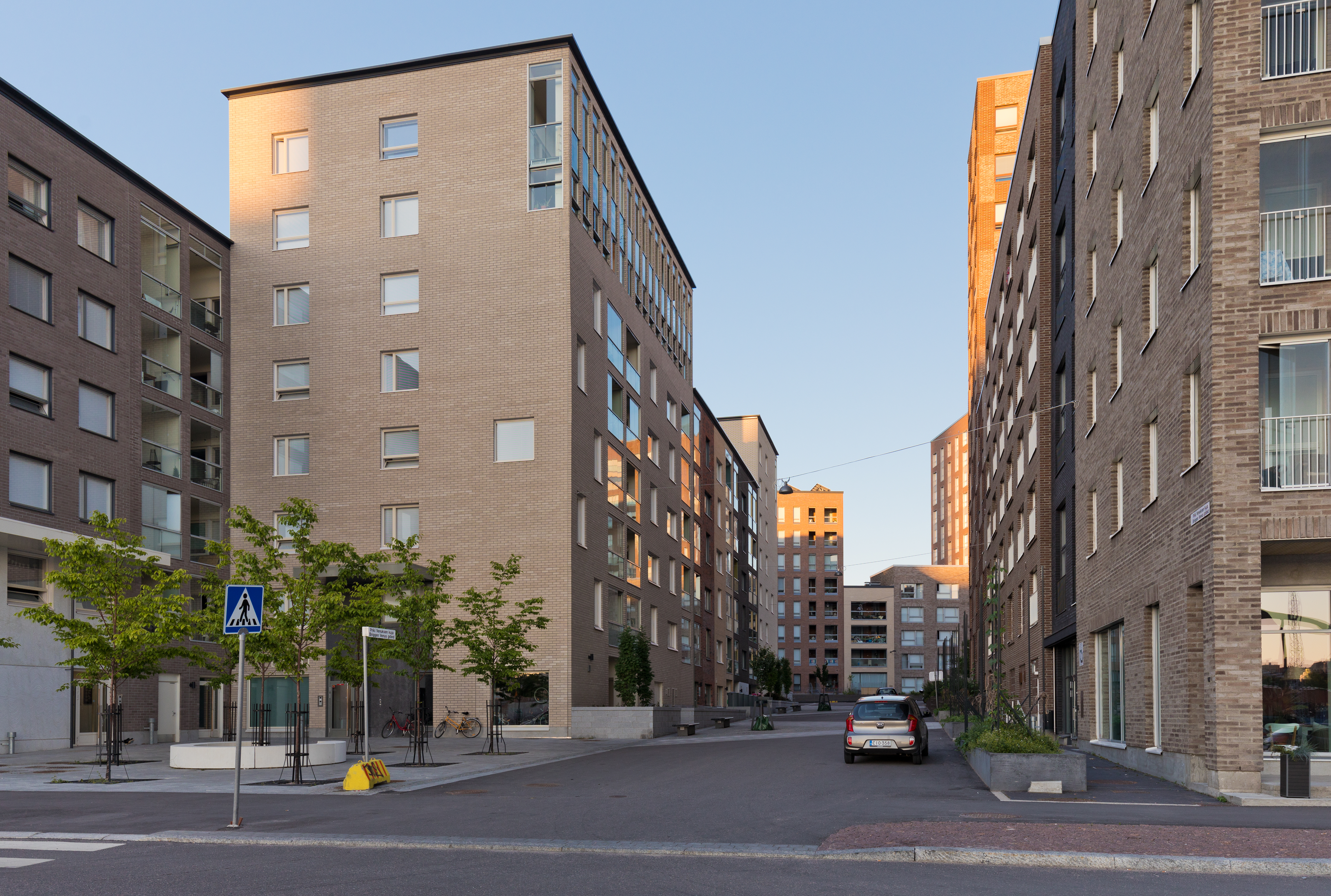
Priki Venuksen kuja ("Brig Venus alley") is one of the street names referring to old ships on the island.

Similar to Kalasatama, many of the streets in Sompasaari are named after the district's harbour history. Gustaf Wilhelm Sundman, who rented the island from the city in the early 19th century, owned several ships, whose names have been passed to the blocks and streets in Sompasaari: Flöitti Diana, Fregatti Dygden, Kaljaasi Aurora, Priki Johanna and Priki Venus. The Loviseholminpuisto park and the alleys Loviseholminkuja and Loviseholminpolku surrounding it are named after Sundman's wife. The streets Aallonhalkoja, Vinsentinaukio and Vinsentinkatu are named after the character Vinsentti Aallonhalkoja in Zachris Topelius's short story collection Talvi-iltain tarinoita. The collection has a reference to Sompasaari and the observation tower previously located on the island.
