= Kruunuvuorenselkä =

Bay in Helsinki, Finland

- Kronobergsfjärden
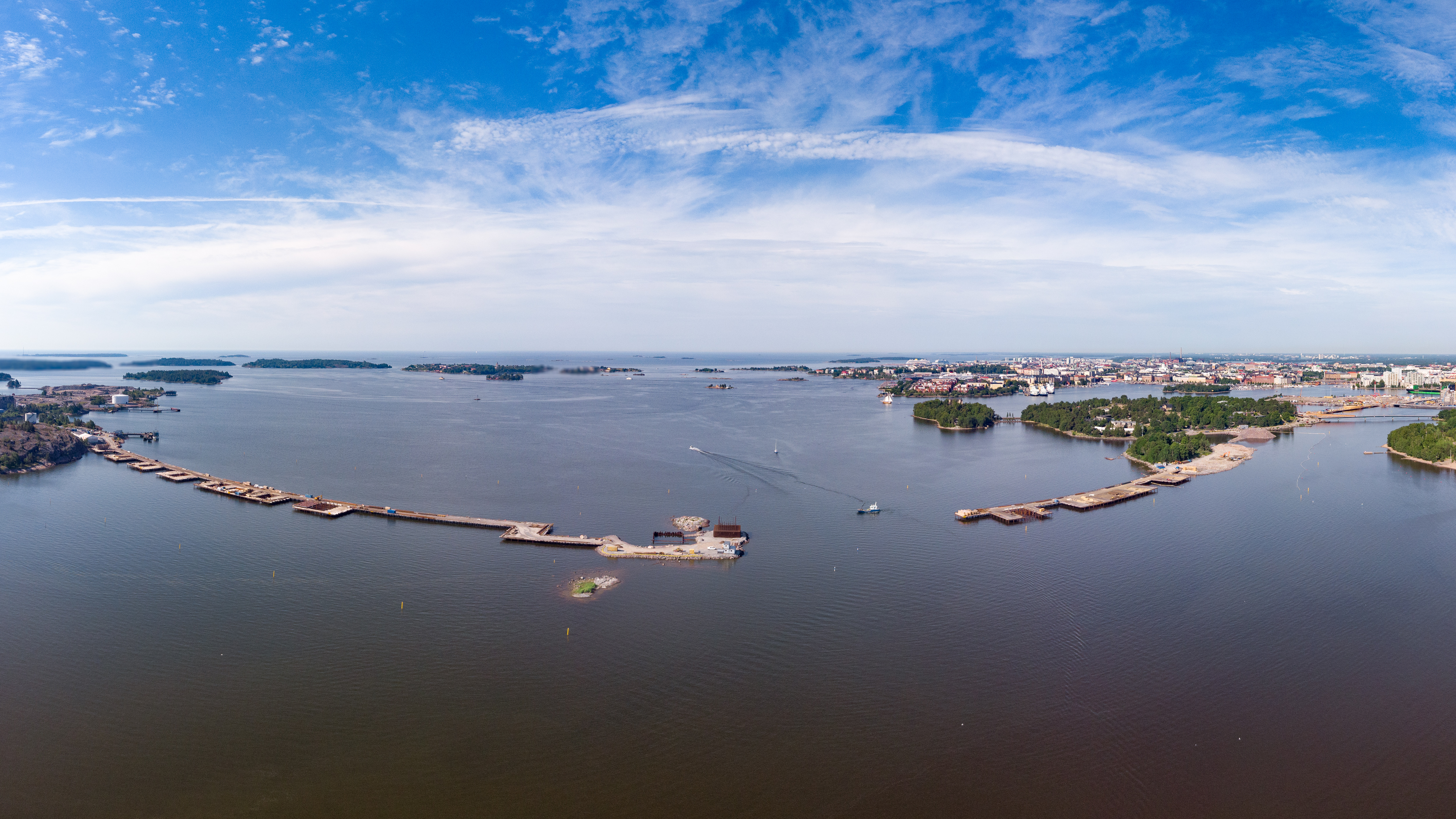
- Aerial view of Kruunuvuorenselkä, looking south, with Helsinki city centre on the right and Laajasalo on the left. The Kruunuvuorensilta bridge, under construction, is visible across the inlet.

- Location within Helsinki
- Location: Helsinki, Finland
- Coordinates: 60.1575°N 24.9976°E
- Type: Inlet or bay
- Etymology: Named after Kruunuvuori hill in adjacent Laajasalo
- Part of: Gulf of Finland, Baltic Sea
- Max. length: c. 5 kilometres (3.1 mi)
- Max. width: c. 2.5 kilometres (1.6 mi)
- Islands: eg. Korkeasaari, Mustikkamaa, Nihti, Lonna, Vasikkasaari

Kruunuvuorenselkä (Swedish: Kronobergsfjärden) is a body of water in Helsinki, Finland, located between the city centre and the eastern suburbs.

It is approximately 5 kilometres (3.1 mi) long (north-south) and 2–3 kilometres (1.2–1.9 mi) wide (east-west), and bounded by the islands of Suomenlinna and Vallisaari to the south; the districts of Santahamina and Laajasalo to the east; the island of Kulosaari to the north; and the city centre area of Helsinki to the west.

Kruunuvuorenselkä carries much of the waterborne traffic into and out of Helsinki's South, Hanasaari and Sörnäinen Harbours, shuttle ferry and sightseeing traffic between the city centre and nearby islands, as well as extensive leisure boating based at marinas in Pohjoisranta, Herttoniemenranta, and elsewhere. The fairways leading to each of the main harbours around Kruunuvuorenselkä are a minimum of 9.3 metres (31 ft) deep. Access from Kruunuvuorenselkä to the wider Gulf of Finland is mostly through the narrow Kustaanmiekka strait between Suomenlinna and Vallisaari.

A bridge, Kruunuvuorensilta, is being built across Kruunuvuorenselkä as part of the Crown Bridges initiatives, connecting central Helsinki with the eastern suburbs at Laajasalo and beyond. The bridge will carry pedestrian and bicycle traffic and a tram route, but no car traffic. Construction began in late 2021, and the bridge is expected to open to traffic by 2027.
