= Nihti =

Island and residential area in Helsinki, Finland

Coordinates: 60°10′42.13″N 24°58′27.41″E

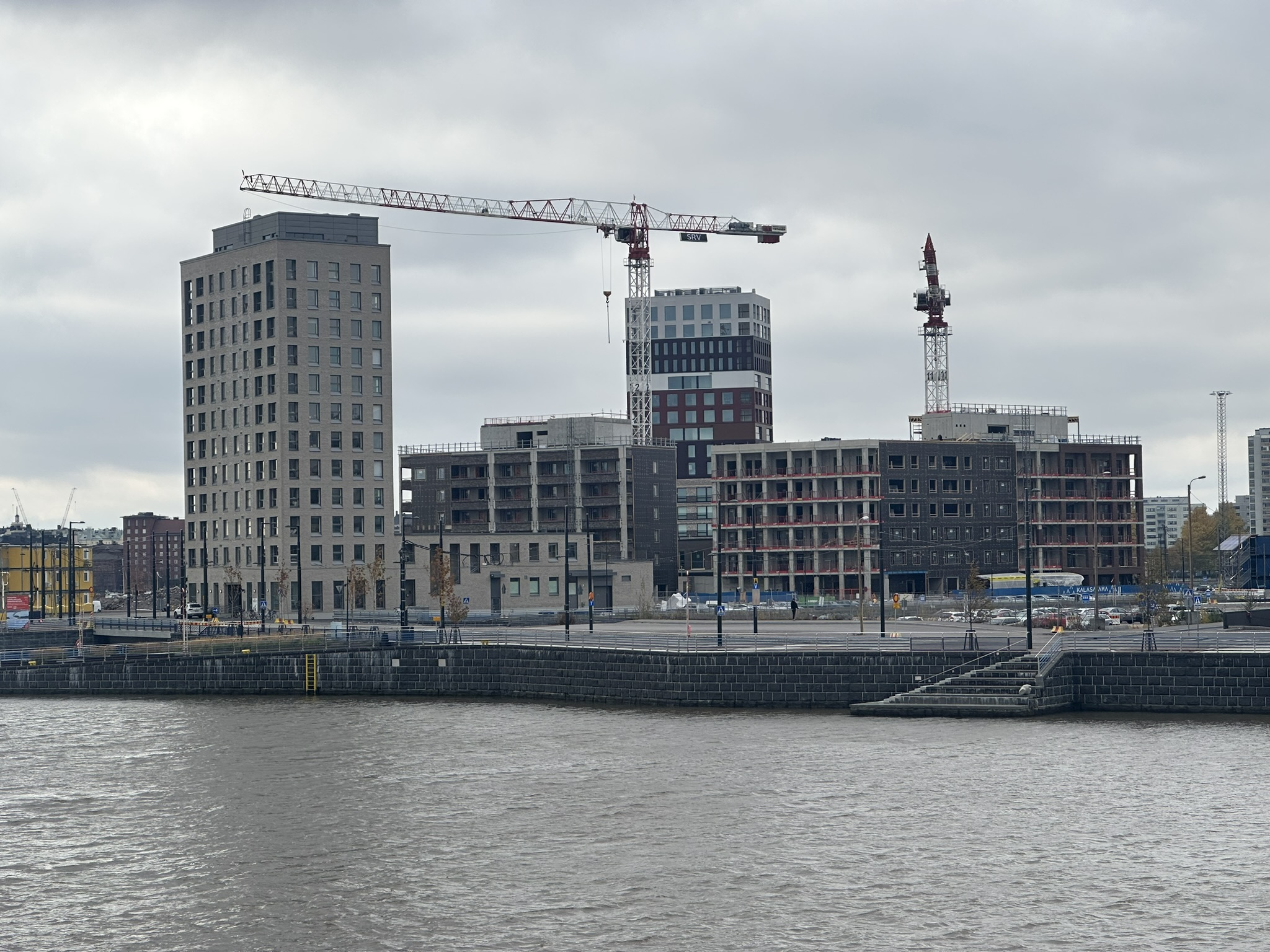
Nihti in late 2024.

Nihti (Swedish: Knekten) is an island on the Kruunuvuorenselkä water area in the Sörnäinen district in Helsinki, Finland. On the northern side of the Nihdinkanava channel is the island of Sompasaari.

== History ==
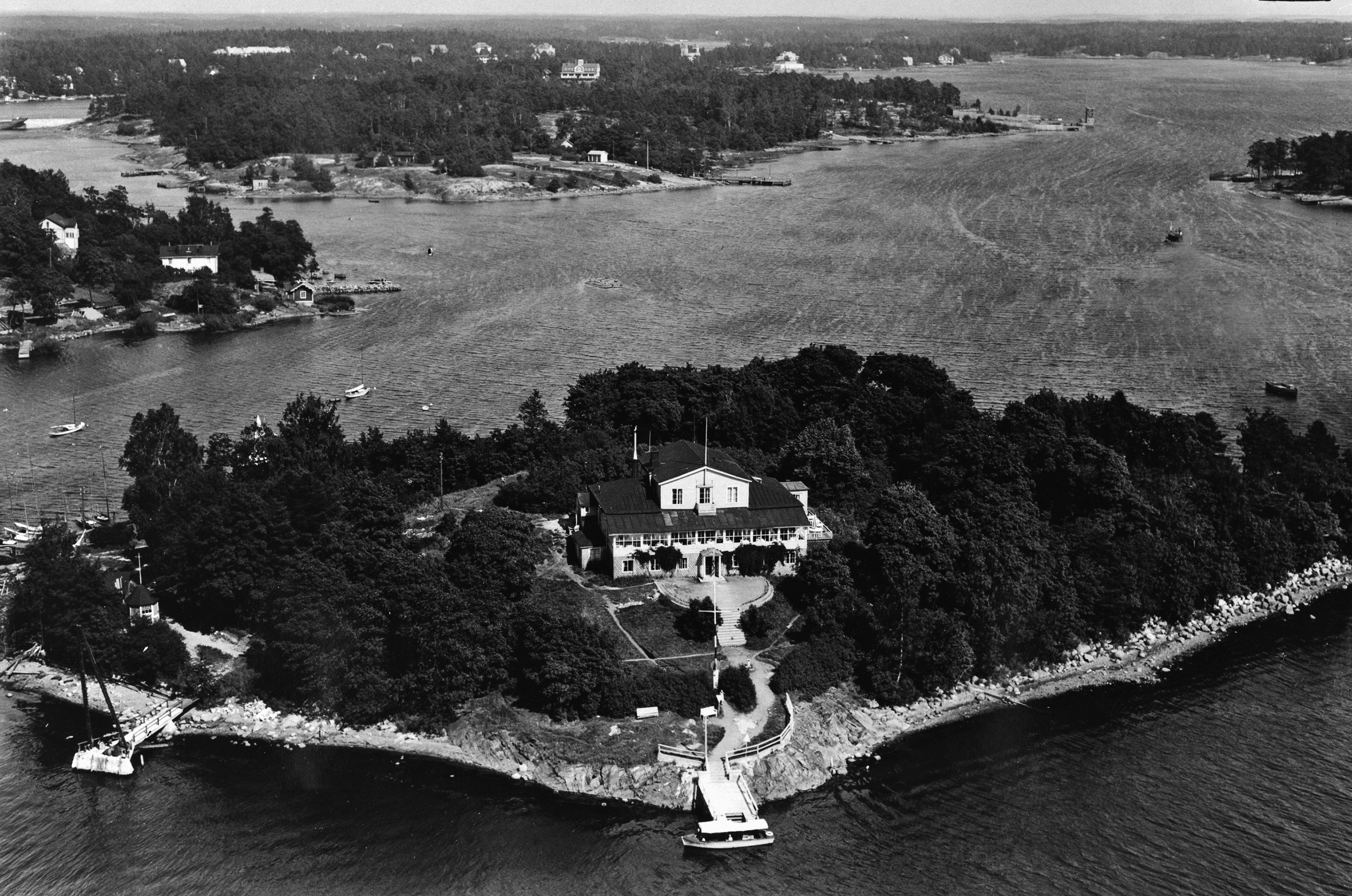
Nihti as an island in the 1930s before it was connected to the mainland as part of the Sörnäinen Harbour.

=== Sörnäinen harbor ===
Nihti was a part of the Sörnäinen Harbour until its closure in 2008 in favour of the new Vuosaari Harbour.

=== Residential use ===
Nihti is being converted into a residential area with plans to build apartments for about 3,000 people. The island is an interchange point in the Helsinki tram network, as both the Pasila–Kalasatama line 13 and the Crown Bridges light rail lines pass through Nihti. Construction on the island started in July 2021. The first residents moved to Nihti in 2024.
