= Isoisänsilta =

Bridge in Helsinki, Finland

Isoisänsilta Isoisänsilta / Farfarsbron
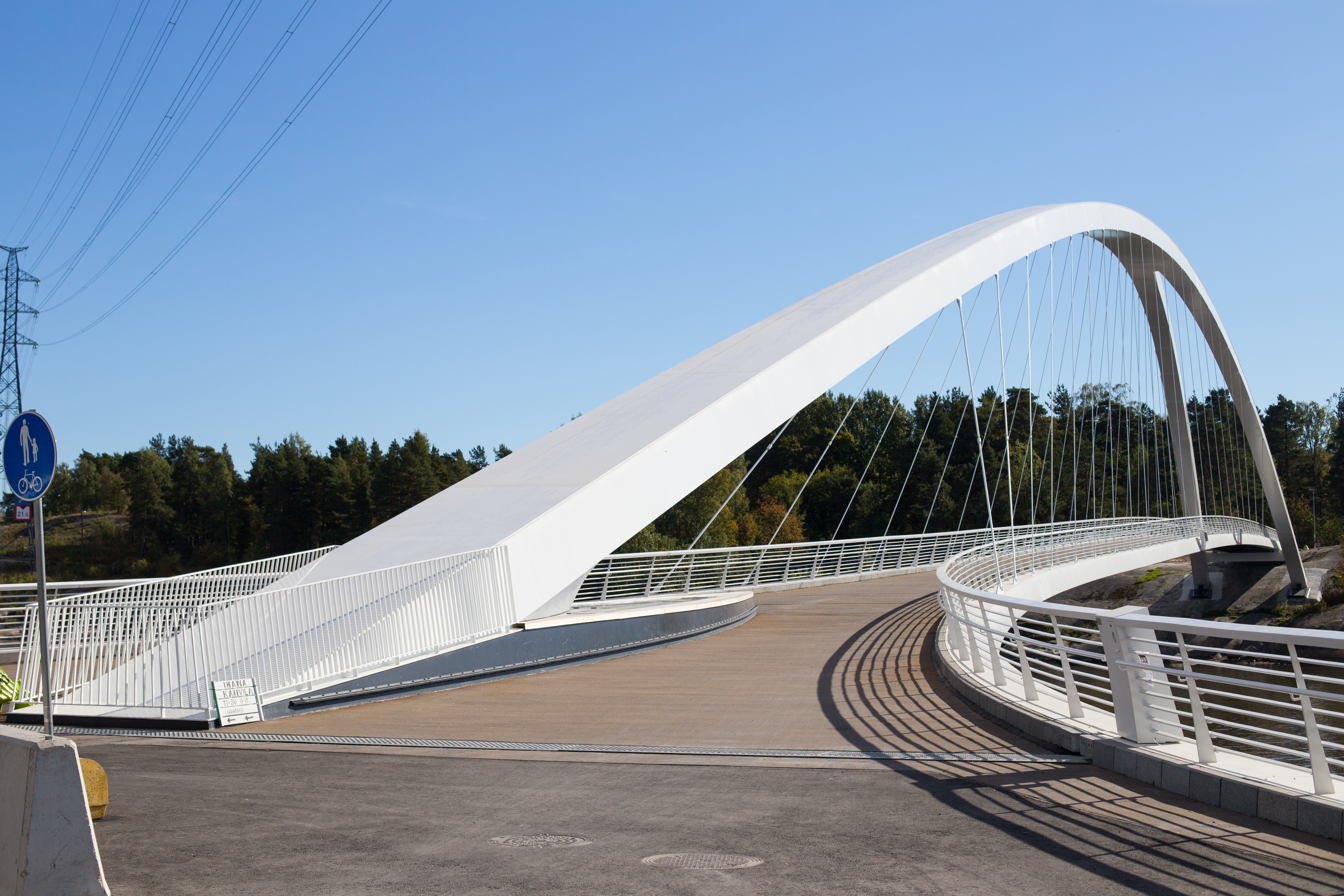
- Isoisänsilta viewed from the Kalasatama (mainland) end
- Coordinates: 60.182167°N 24.982556°E
- Carries: Pedestrians, bicycles
- Crosses: Sompasaarensalmi
- Locale: East Helsinki
- Begins: Kalasatama
- Ends: Mustikkamaa
- Named for: Isoisänniemi, Mustikkamaa

Characteristics
- Design: Cantilever, with orthotropic deck
- Material: Steel
- Total length: c. 170 metres (560 ft)
- Width: 4 metres (13 ft) (minimum)
- Longest span: 144 metres (472 ft)
- Clearance below: 6.7 metres (22 ft)

History
- Designer: Pontek
- Construction start: August 2014
- Opening: June 2016

Location
- Interactive map of Isoisänsilta

Isoisänsilta (Swedish: Farfarsbron) is a pedestrian and cycling bridge in Helsinki, Finland, opened in June 2016.

The bridge connects the Kalasatama neighbourhood on the Helsinki mainland to the island of Mustikkamaa and, via it, to the islands of Korkeasaari and Kulosaari.

The total length of the bridge is c. 170 metres (560 ft), including the 144 metres (472 ft) main span. The minimum width of the deck is 4 metres (13 ft), which at the Kalasatama end widens and splits into two lanes separated by the central bridge arch. Conversely, at the Mustikkamaa end, the arch splits into two supports on either side of the central bridge deck.

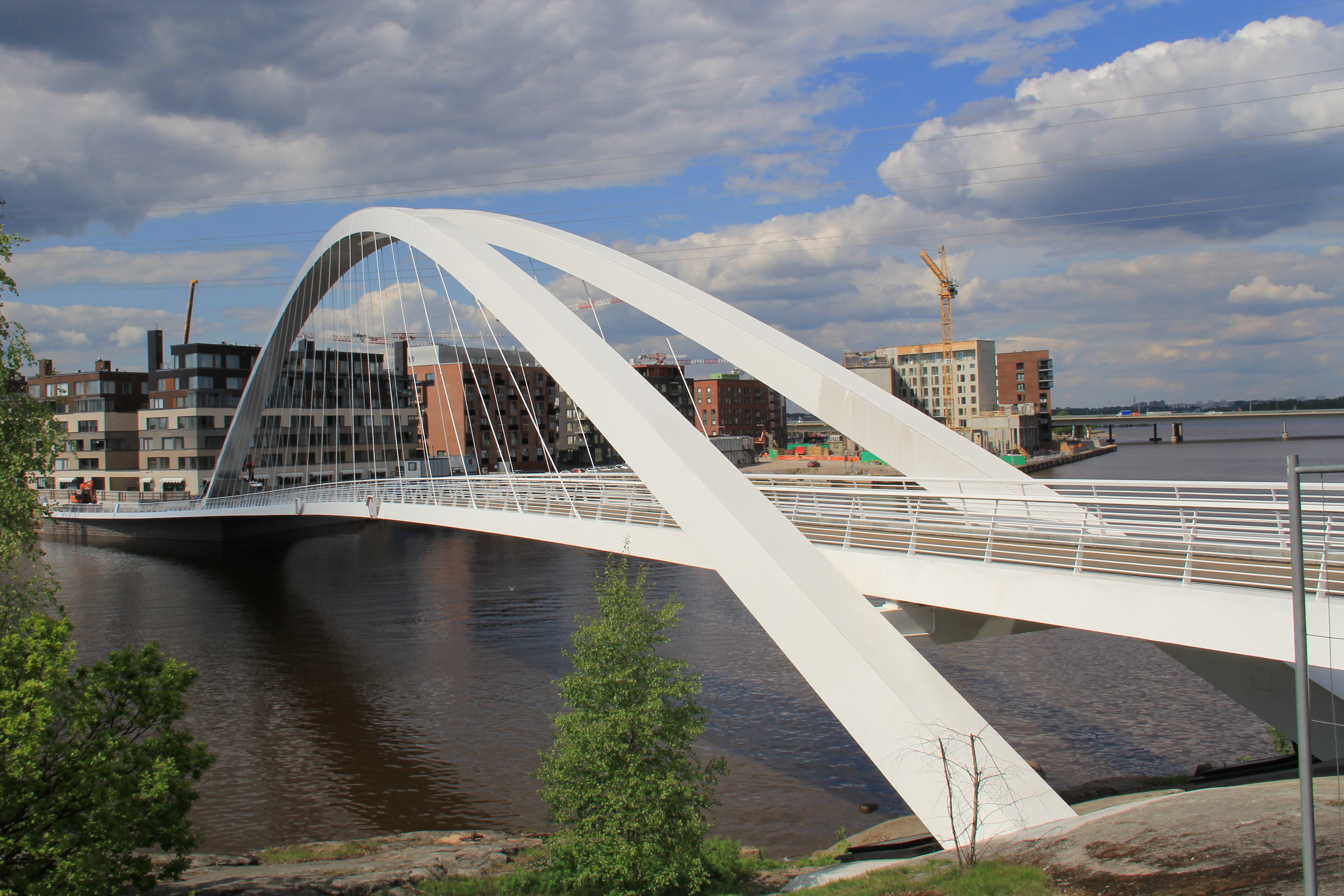
Isoisänsilta viewed from the Mustikkamaa end

The bridge was designed by the civil engineering firm Pontek, and is based on their winning entry, titled Tiikerihai ("Tiger Shark"), into the design contest held by the City of Helsinki in 2011. Construction began in 2014 and was completed in 2016, with the bridge opening to traffic on 1 June 2016.

The bridge is named after the Isoisänniemi promontory of Mustikkamaa, and its name literally translates as "Grandfather's Bridge".

Some locals have taken to climbing on top of the bridge arch, in a number cases jumping off into the sea approximately 14 metres (46 ft) below, which the police and rescue service strongly advice against as dangerous.

In 2017, the Finnish Association of Civil Engineers chose Isoisänsilta as the 'Bridge of the Year'.

== See also ==
- Mustikkamaa
- Kalasatama
