= Hanasaari, Helsinki =

Neighbourhood in Sörnäinen, Helsinki, Finland

Coordinates: 60°10.9′N 24°58.0′E

Hanasaari (Swedish: Hanaholmen) is a neighbourhood in the district of Sörnäinen in Helsinki, Finland, between the neighbourhoods of Vilhonvuori, Kalasatama and Sompasaari near Merihaka. The name comes from an island that was lost under reclaimed land. Hanasaari has primarily been a power plant area, although the plant has already been shut down. The first power plant was built next to Hanasaari in Suvilahti.

== History ==
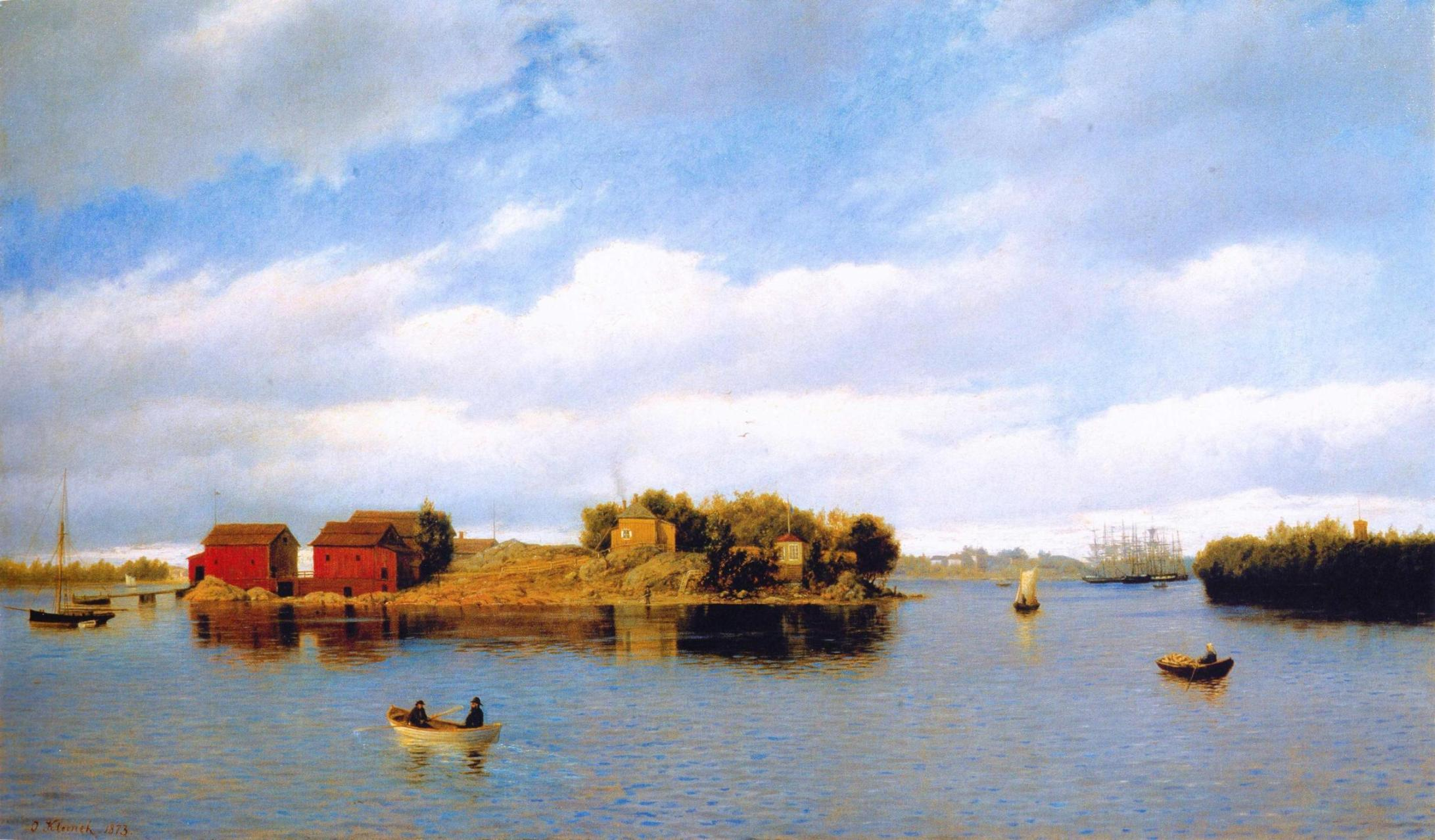
Hanasaari, a painting by Oscar Kleineh from 1873.

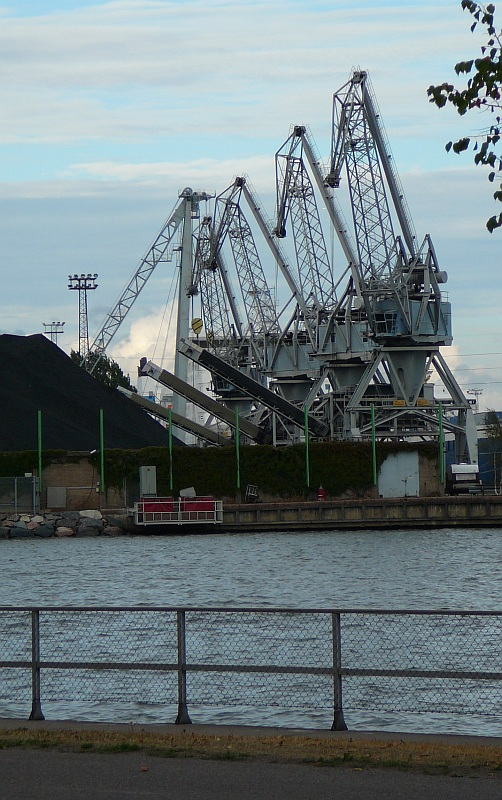
Coal cranes at the power plant seen from the shore of Merihaka.

=== Etymology ===
The name of the island first appeared in a 1639 map of Helsinki as Haneholmen, where the word hane meant rooster. The name came from the smaller island named Hönan ("the hen"), thus the names of the two islands formed a pair, which is typical in island names. In 1909 the Swedish and Finnish names Hanaholmen - Hanaholma were in use. The current name Hanasaari was made official in 1928, but it had already been in use since the 1880s.

=== Power plant ===
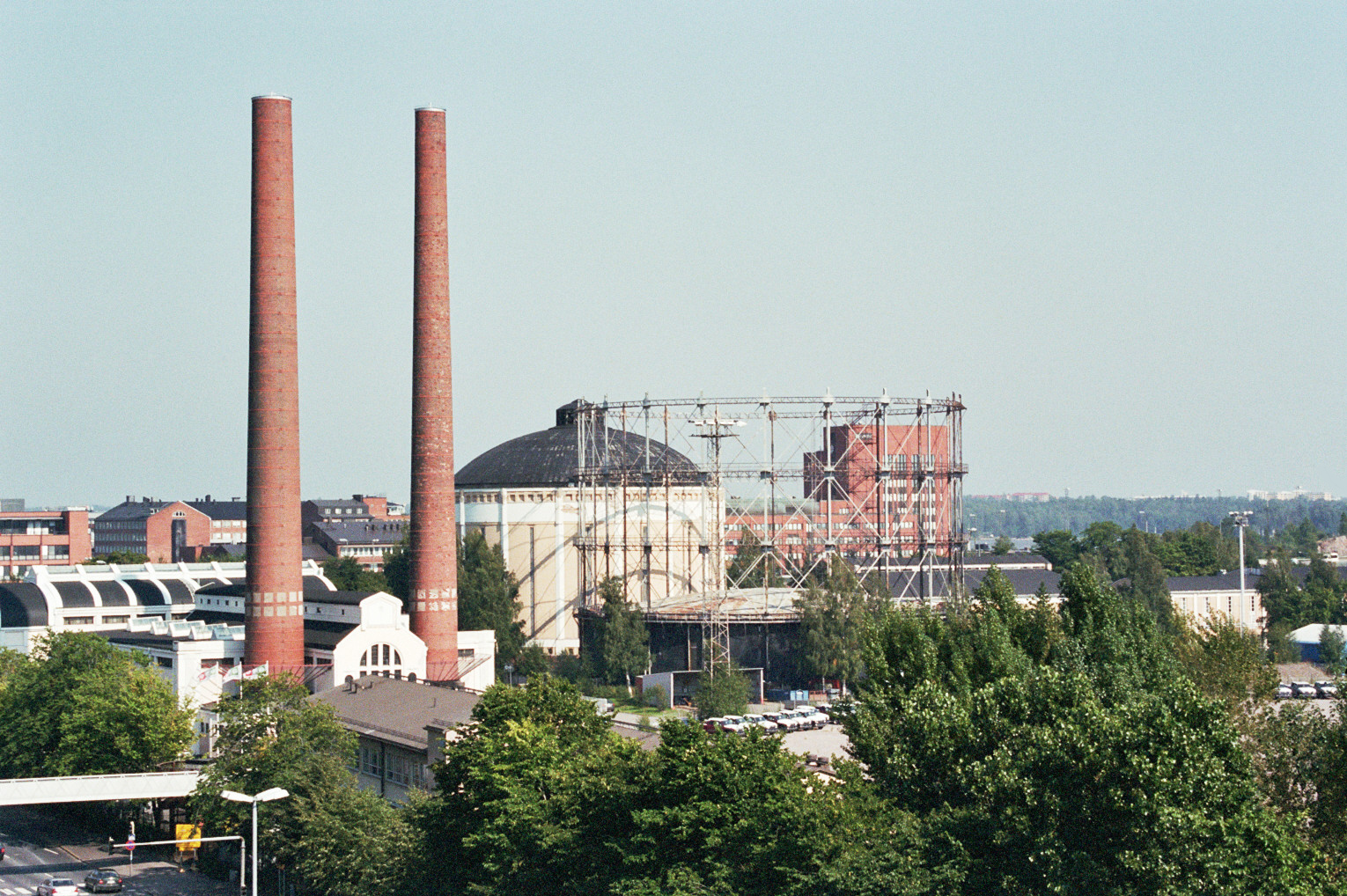
The old Suvilahti power plant designed by Selim A. Lindqvist.

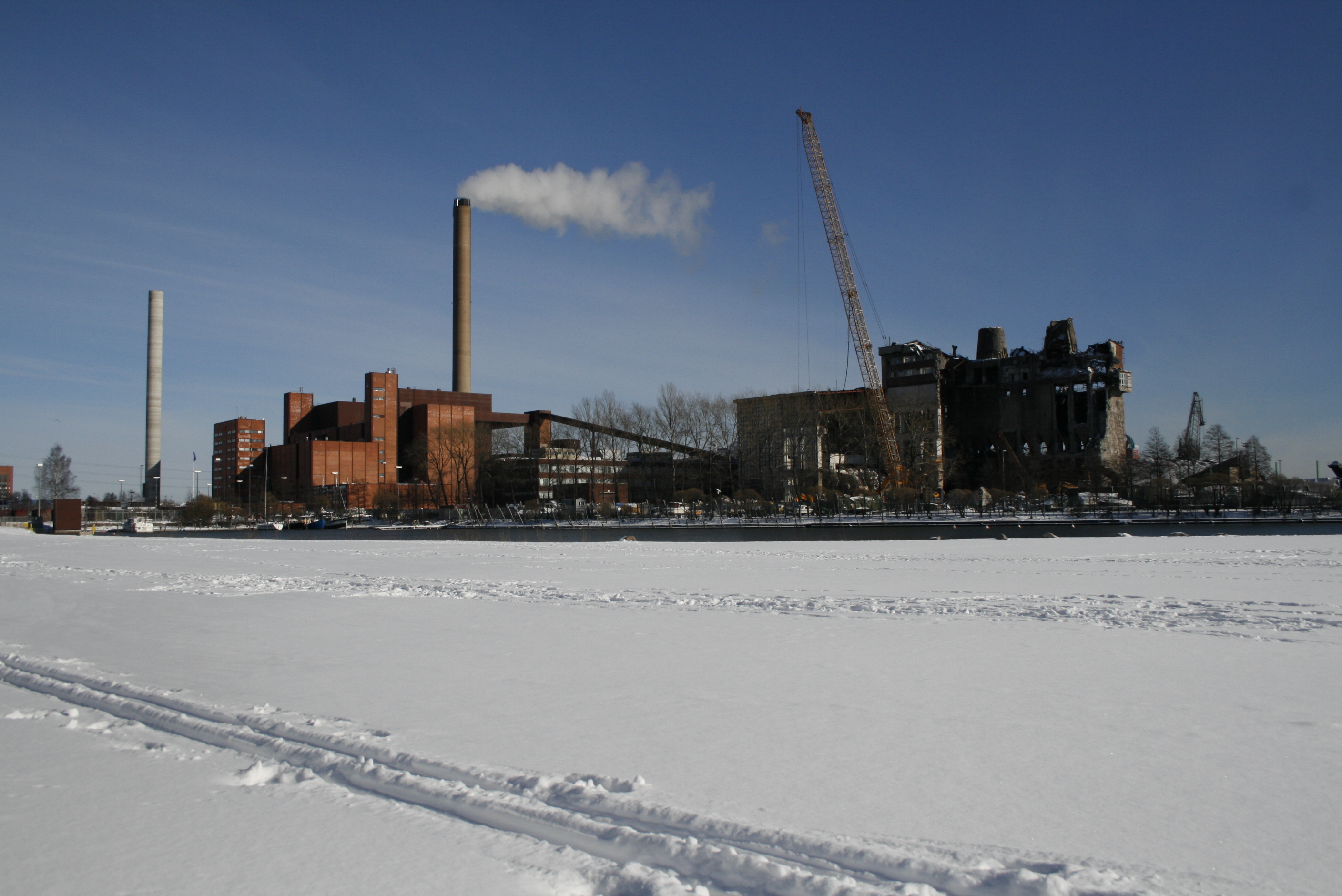
The Hanasaari Power Plant in 2008. The B plant is on the left, the A plant (since dismantled) is on the right.

Building the A plant of the Hanasaari Power Plant started in 1957 and it was completed in 1960. The A plant was in use until 2000 and since that as a backup plant. A decision to dismantle the A plant was made in 2006. Planning the B plant started in 1962, and it started operating in 1974. There have been plans for residential building in the area, which will require cleansing the soil, as cyanide was found in the soil near the red-brick B plant in 2006. Cleansing the groundwater in the area is expensive and difficult, and can take decades to fully complete.

== As a residential area ==
The plant was shut down on April 1, 2023, after the Helsinki City Council had voted for its closing back in 2015. There will be a new residential area in Hanasaari in the 2030s.
