= Crown Bridges =

Set of bridges in Helsinki

Crown Bridges Kruunusillat Kronbroarna
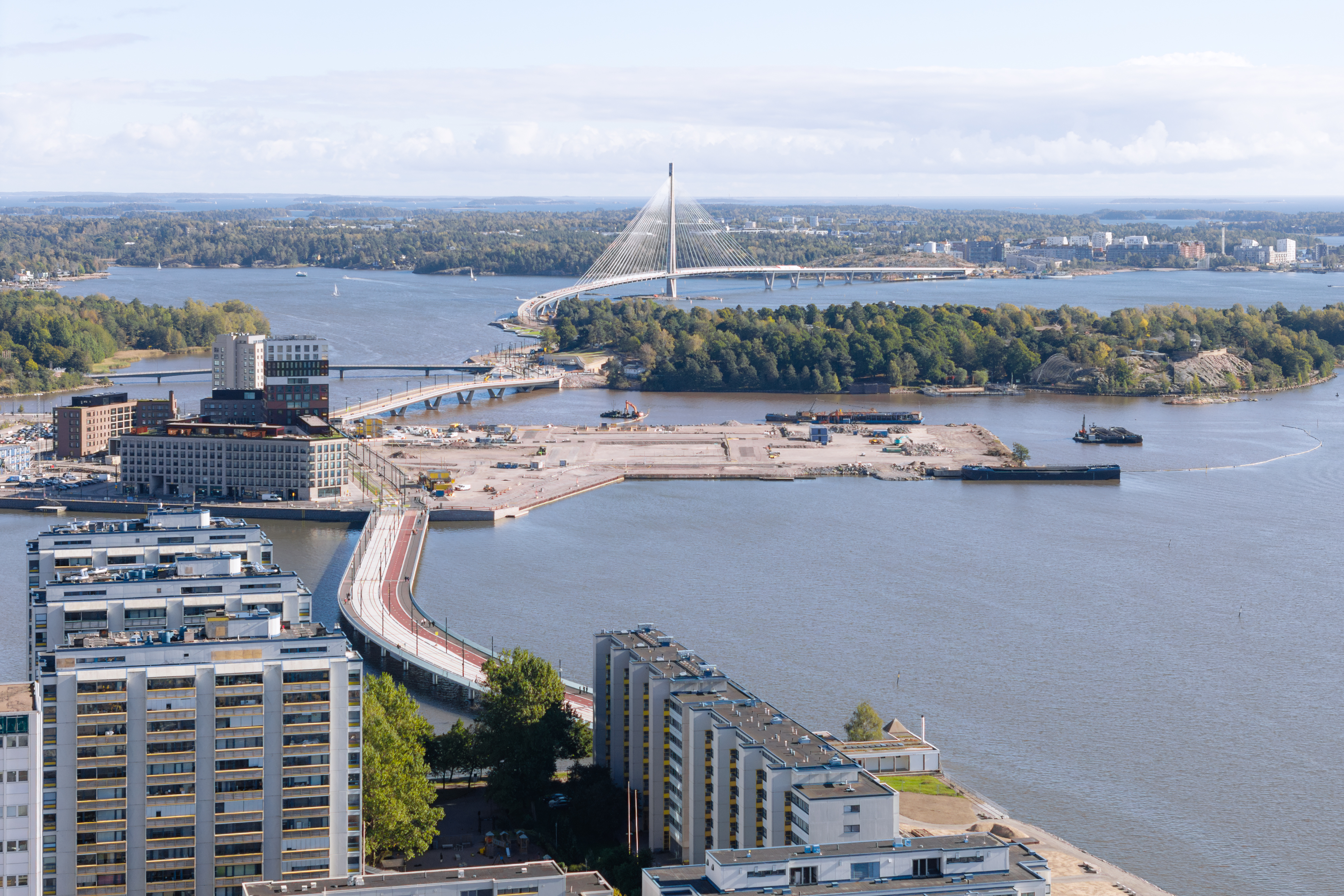
- Carries: Two lines of the Helsinki tram network, pedestrians, bikes, emergency vehicles
- Locale: Helsinki, Finland

Characteristics
- Design: Cable-stayed bridge
- Total length: 1,921 metres (6,302 ft)
- Height: 135 metres (443 ft)
- Longest span: 260 metres (853 ft)
- Clearance below: 3.1–20 metres (10–66 ft)

History
- Construction start: 2021
- Construction end: 2026

The Crown Bridges (Finnish: Kruunusillat, Swedish: Kronbroarna, Kronobroarna) are three bridges in Helsinki, Finland, that carry Helsinki tram network lines 11 and 12 to the island of Laajasalo. All bridges had been opened for pedestrian and cycle traffic by April 2026 and tram services began operating in November of that year.

== History ==
=== Background ===
The city council of Helsinki decided on 31 August 2016 to build a tramway to the island of Laajasalo, located to the east of Helsinki city centre. The route includes three new bridges, the longest of which is the longest in Finland at 1.2 kilometres (0.75 mi), and its pylons one of the tallest structures in Helsinki. The bridges have bicycle and pedestrian lanes in addition to the tramway, but no lanes for private cars. The total length of new double track, including tramways on Laajasalo itself, is about 10 kilometres (6.2 mi).

There are several new areas of housing under construction on the island as of 2016. The site of a former oil shipping terminal at Kruunuvuorenranta is expected to house 12,500 new residents when construction is completed by 2025, and densification of other areas on Laajasalo is expected to add another 10,000. The tramway connection over a series of bridges was originally chosen as the basis for development by Helsinki city council on 12 November 2008. The discarded alternatives were an extension of the Helsinki Metro in a tunnel or over a bridge. The completed tramway plan and its funding were finally approved by the council only in August 2016, almost eight years later.

In the plan dated in May 2016, the bridge and tramway structures are projected to cost 259 million euros, although in 2021 the maximum price was increased to 326 million euros. Additionally, the required investments in a depot and rolling stock are projected at 20–25 and 75–80 million euros, respectively. The total length of new double track would be about 10 kilometres (6.2 mi).

=== Construction ===
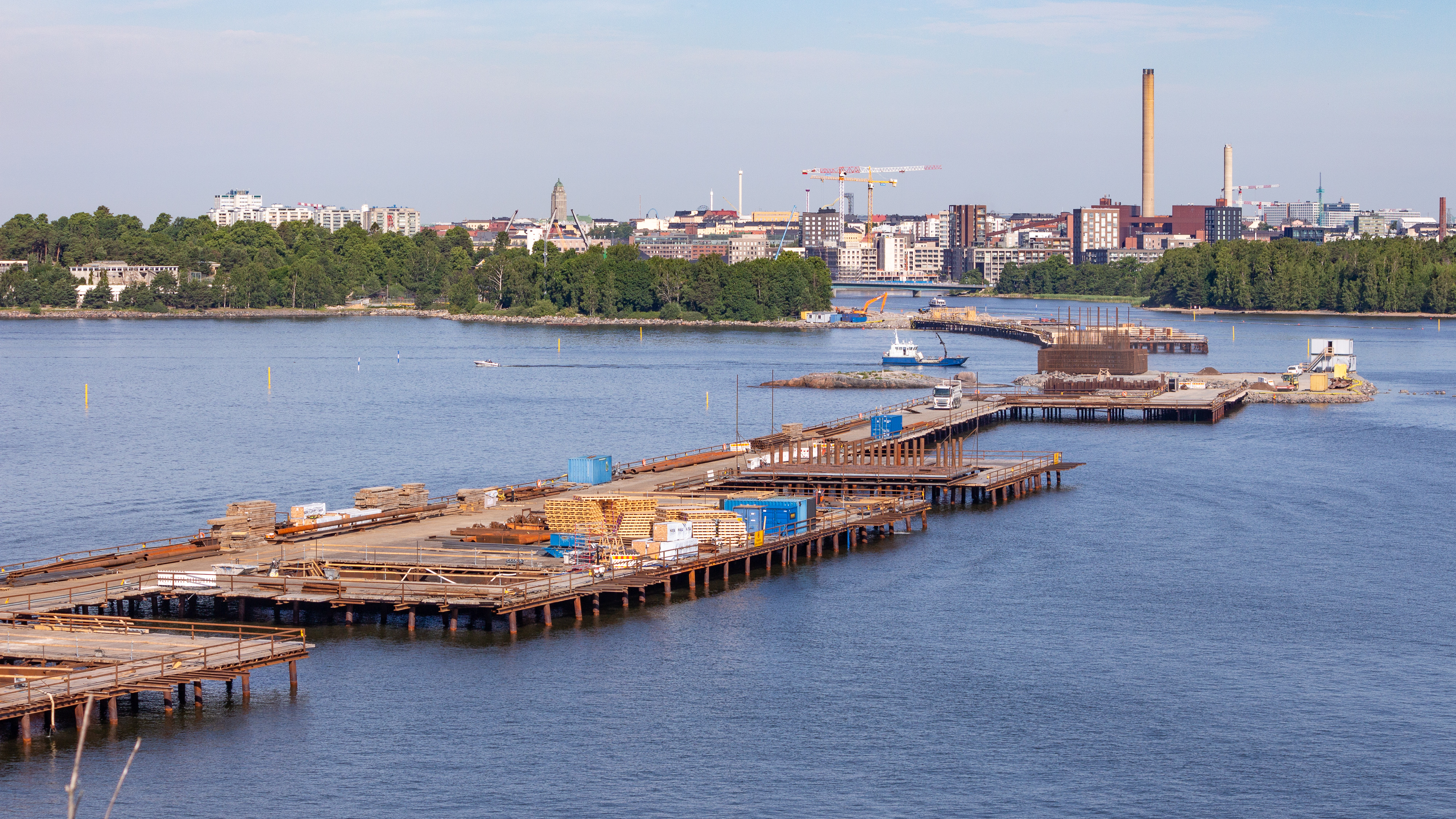
The Kruunuvuori Bridge construction site in summer 2022. It will become the longest bridge in Finland.

Construction of the bridges started in October 2021. The tram first tracks were laid on Laajasalo island on 31 May 2022.

The Merihaka Bridge was opened to pedestrian traffic in May 2025, the Finke Bridge in December 2025, and the Kruunuvuori Bridge in April 2026. Tram services began in November 2026.

== Technical data ==
Crown Bridges (Kruunusillat)
Name	Link	Length	Clearance below	Built in
Merihaka Bridge (Merihaansilta)	Merihaka–Nihti	422 m (1,385 ft)	3.1 metres (10 ft)	2022–6
Finke Bridge (Finkensilta)	Nihti–Korkeasaari	293 m (961 ft)	7 metres (23 ft)	2021–5
Kruunuvuori Bridge (Kruunuvuorensilta)	Korkeasaari–Kruunuvuorenranta	1,228 m (4,029 ft)	20 metres (66 ft)	2021–5

== Tram services ==
Škoda Artic X54 tram approaching Kruunuvuori Bridge

The bridges carry two lines of the Helsinki tram network:

- 11 Pasila – Kalasatama – Kruunuvuori
- 12 Rautatientori – Hakaniemi – Yliskylä

Helsinki City Transport ordered 23 ForCity Smart Artic X54 trams to operate on the Crown Bridges in 2021. The same model, also known as Artic XL, is used on Helsinki light rail line 15 as well.

== Future ==
In 2008, the city council approved a motion that in the further planning of the Laajasalo area tram, expanding the tram network to the Herttoniemi metro station should be investigated. Additionally, in case that the military base in Santahamina will be freed for residential construction in the future, provisions will be made for converting the tram lines into a light rail system that would extend into Santahamina in the south and travel in a tunnel from Korkeasaari to Katajanokka, linking with the planned north–south line of the Helsinki Metro.
