= Oscar Kleineh =

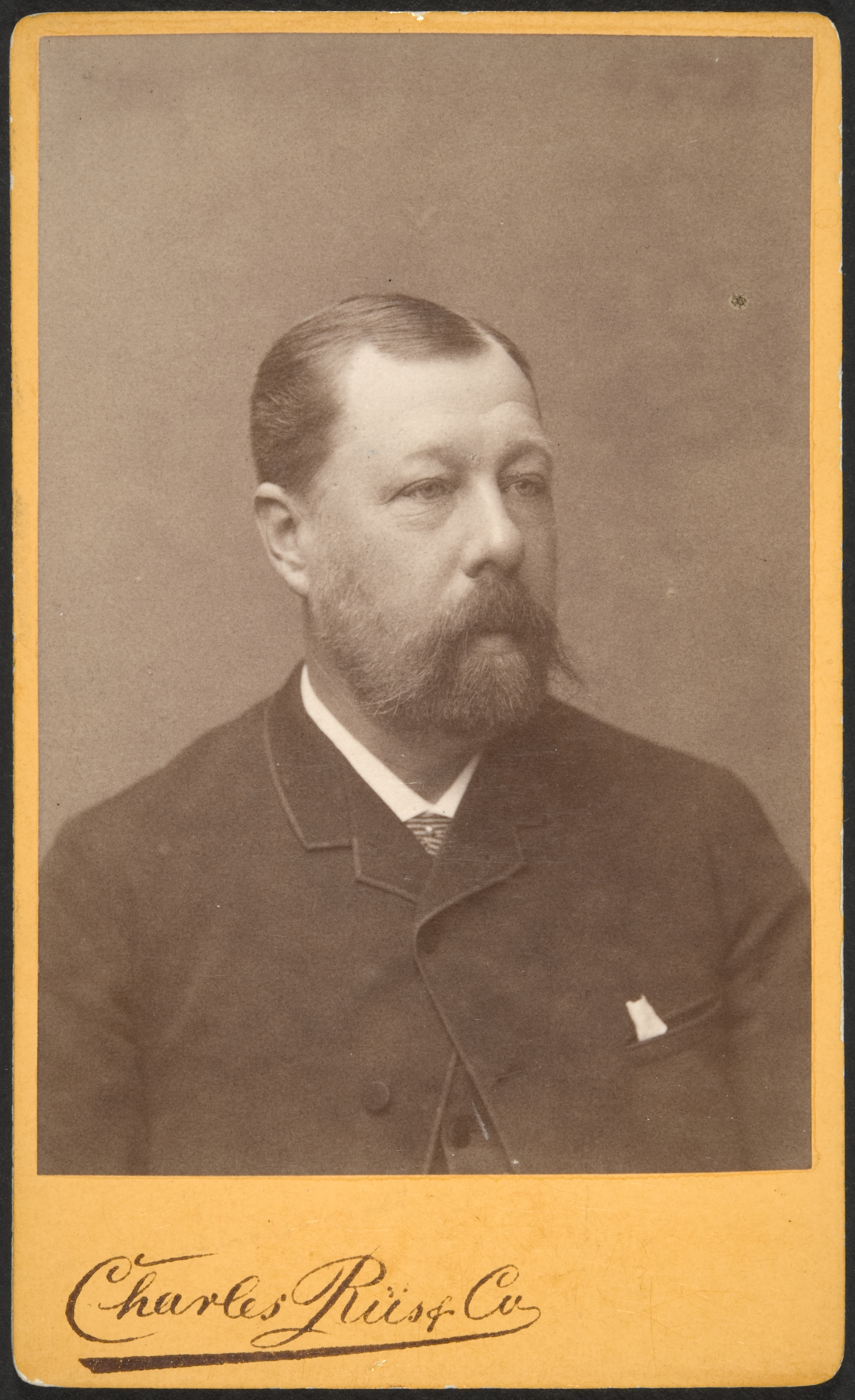
Oscar Kleineh.

Oscar Conrad Kleineh (18 September 1846, Helsinki – 16 November 1919, Helsinki) was a Finnish painter.

== Biography ==
His parents were Louis Gabriel Kleineh, a restaurateur of German origin, and Maria Christina Forsell, who was from Hamina. Kleineh studied at the Academy of Fine Arts in Helsinki from 1863 to 1866. Kleineh studied in Düsseldorf in 1866 under Andreas Møller and in Karlsruhe in 1867 under Hans Gude. One of Kleineh's role models was Werner Holmberg. He drew his motifs from Finland, Norway, France (Brittany) and also the Mediterranean.

Kleineh returned to Finland in 1870 and then continued his studies at the Imperial Academy of Arts in St. Petersburg, where he stayed for four years. His teachers there were the marine painter Alexey Bogolyubov and later Mikhail Clodt von Jürgensburg. Kleineh specialized in marine art and cityscapes. After his studies, he lived mainly in Norway from 1879 to 1880, where he painted coastal and fjord landscapes, and in Paris from 1881 to 1886.

His works are represented in, among others, the art museum Ateneum in Helsinki, the Turku Art Museum and the National Museum in Oslo.

== Awards and honours ==
Kleineh won several prizes during the 1870s and 1880s. In St. Petersburg he received the academy's silver medal twice, he won the Finnish Art Society's (Finnish: Suomen Taideyhdistys) ducat prize and in 1877 a prize in the state landscape painting competition. In 1885 he participated in a Norwegian landscape painting competition with the painting Afton vid Smölen and received the same number of votes as Victor Westerholm, Kleineh won the competition after a drawing of lots.
