= Kalasatama =

Kalasatama Fiskehamnen
- Subdivision
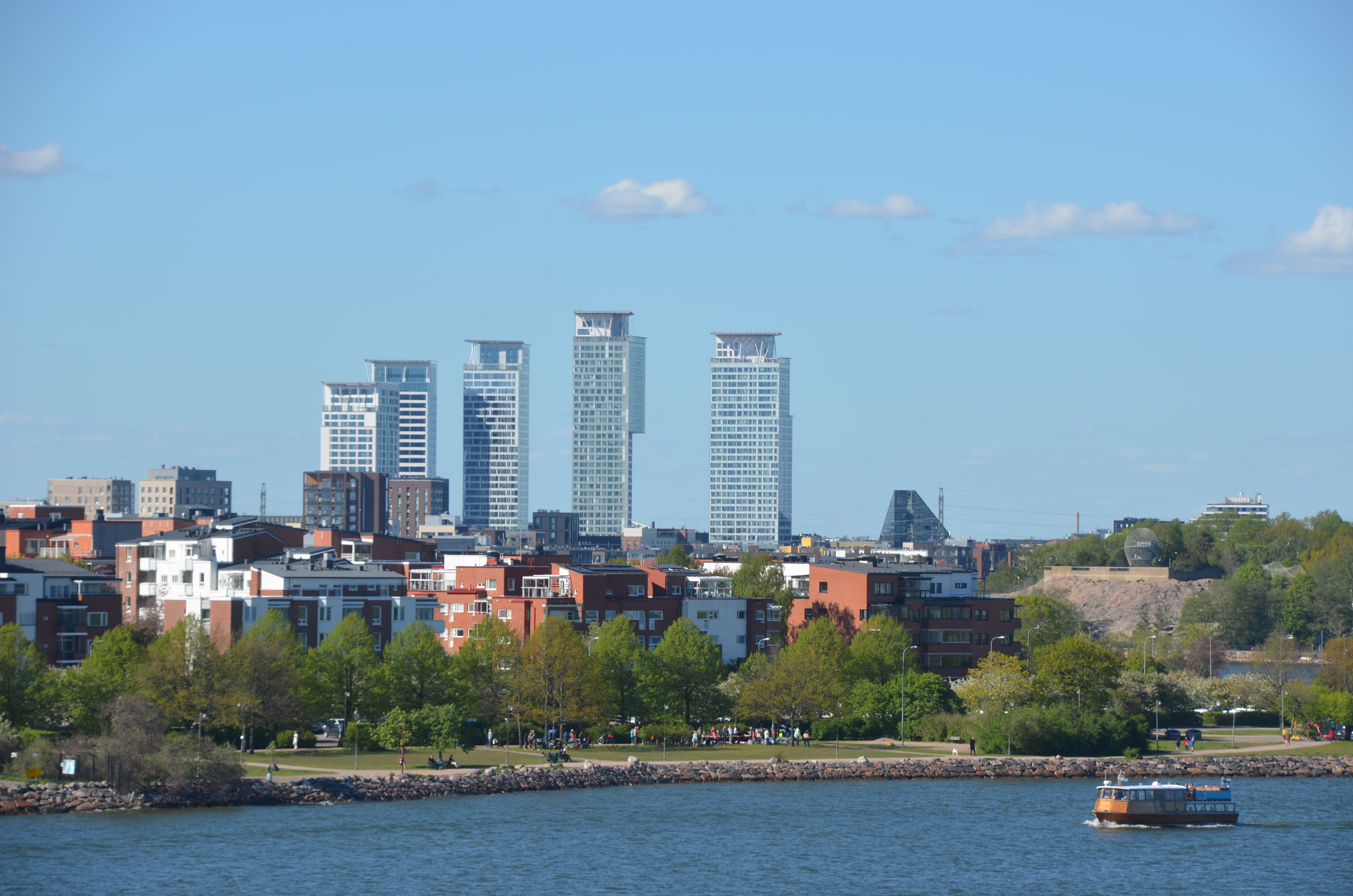
- A view of Kalasatama in May 2025
- Interactive map of Kalasatama
- Coordinates: 60.18479°N 24.980507°E
- Country: Finland
- Region: Uusimaa
- Sub-region: Greater Helsinki
- Municipality: Helsinki
- District: Central
- Area: 0.70 km^{2} (0.27 sq mi)
- Population: 4,632 (2,020−12−31)
  - Density: 6,617/km^{2} (17,140/sq mi)
- Postal codes: 00500
- Subdivision number: 10 (part-division 102)
- Neighbouring subdivisions: Vilhonvuori, Hanasaari, Sompasaari, Kyläsaari, Hermanninmäki, Hermanninranta, Verkkosaari, Kulosaari

Kalasatama (Finnish: [ˈkɑlɑˌsɑtɑmɑ]; Swedish: Fiskehamnen; literally translated "fish harbor") is a neighbourhood in the city of Helsinki, Finland. The area is officially part of the Sörnäinen district; and like Sörnäinen, Kalasatama is located a little more than one kilometre north from the coastal centre of Helsinki, near the district of Hakaniemi, and the east side of Kalasatama borders the sea. Itäväylä, which leads in the direction of East Helsinki, runs next to Kalasatama. The Isoisänsilta pedestrian and cycling bridge, opened in 2016, connects Kalasatama to the nearby islands of Mustikkamaa, Korkeasaari and Kulosaari.

Kalasatama is projected to become a rather densely built-up area - about 25,000 inhabitants expected to come there, about as many as in Kallio. In addition, jobs are planned for Kalasatama for about 10,000 people. A concentration of 23- to 35-storey skyscraper towers are coming to the Kalasatama center area around the Kalasatama metro station, which was completed in 2007. Five of the towers, called Majakka, Loisto, Lumo One, Visio and Horisontti, and the Redi shopping centre are already completed. Kalasatama may be considered the name of a larger area with a number of residential neighbourhoods, including Sompasaari, settled from 2011, Verkkosaari, having acquired residents from the mid 2010's onward, while both Verkkosaari and Hanasaari have continued construction at present.

Attempts have been made to build a smart city from Kalasatama that focuses on smart sensors and robotics. Guide robots in the doctors' offices, robot buses and food delivery robots have already been on display in Kalasatama.

The neighbourhood was given the name Kalasatama as formerly there had been a major commercial port located there, Sörnäinen Harbour, which was replaced in late 2008 by Vuosaari Harbour, after which residential construction began.

== See also ==
- Hermanni (Helsinki)
