= Sörnäinen Harbour =

Former harbour in Helsinki, Finland

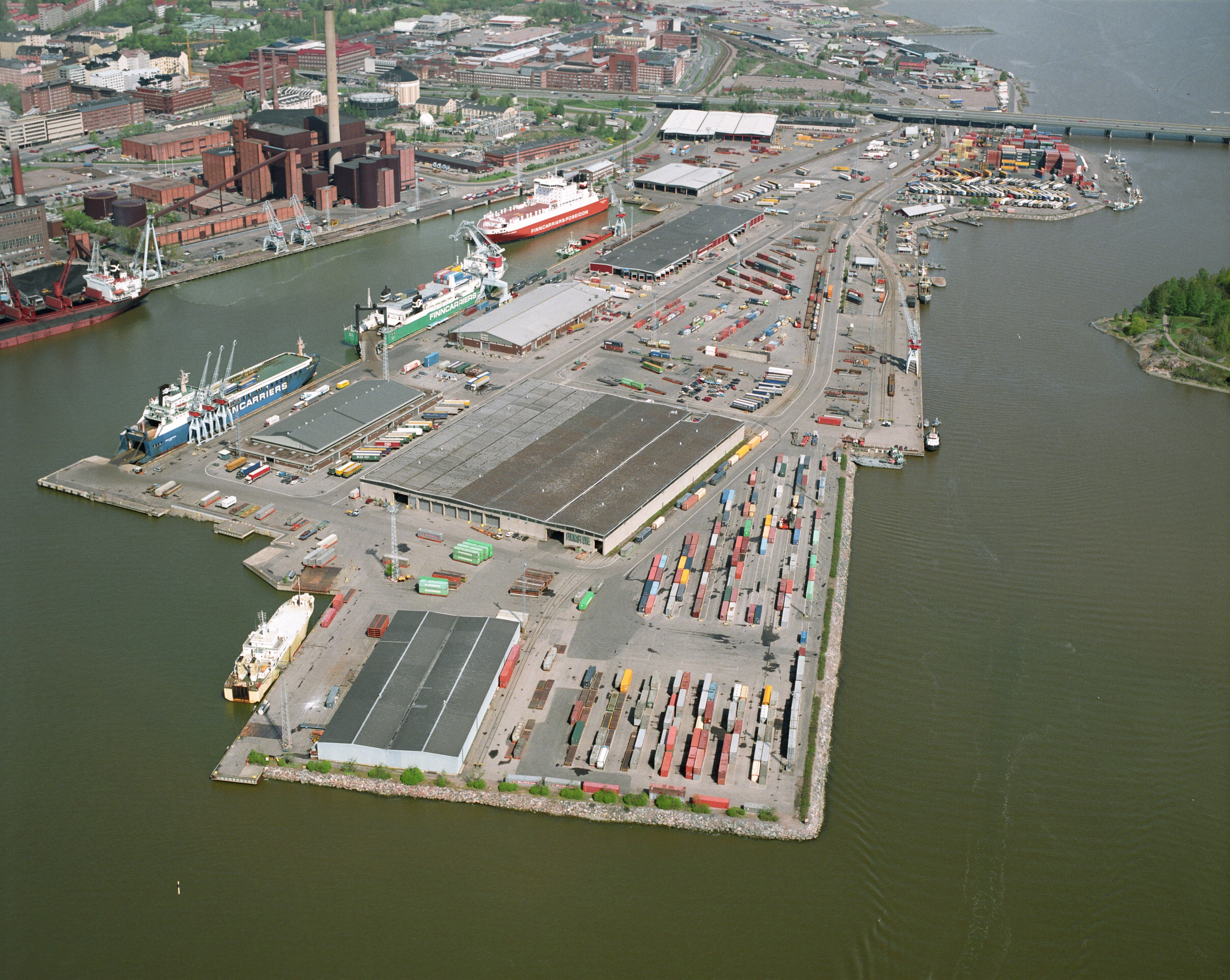
- Aerial view of Sörnäinen Harbour in 1994, looking north, with the Hanasaari Power Plant seen on the left

- Location in Finland
- Native name: Sörnäisten satama – Sörnäs hamn

Location
- Country: Finland
- Location: Sörnäinen, Helsinki
- Coordinates: 60.1795°N 24.9752°E

Details
- Opened: 1863
- Closed: 2008
- Operated by: Port of Helsinki
- Owned by: City of Helsinki
- Type of harbour: Coastal natural
- Draft depth: 9.6 metres (31 ft)

Sörnäinen Harbour (Finnish: Sörnäisten satama, Swedish: Sörnäs hamn) was for nearly one and a half centuries a major harbour and freight terminal in the Port of Helsinki, located in the Sörnäinen district on the eastern shore of the Helsinki city centre area.

It was opened in 1863 to serve mainly the country's timber export trade, in 1889 an oil import terminal was added, and more recently containerised cargo and some passenger traffic. The harbour was finally closed down after 145 years of operation in November 2008, when the new Vuosaari Harbour was opened in the eastern suburb, and the facilities moved there. The only remaining functions relate to the adjacent Hanasaari Power Plant, which is itself being gradually decommissioned.

The port facilities were connected to the rail network at Pasila station via a branch line called Sörnäinen harbour rail, which originally ran through Vallila, but which in 1965 was re-routed around the inner city area via Kumpula.

Since its closure, the harbour area has been redeveloped for residential, retail and leisure use, as part of the Kalasatama development.

The harbour was also commonly referred to as 'Sompasaari Harbour', after a small island which originally was located immediately to its south, but which the harbour development had subsumed under reclaimed land.
