= Korkeasaari =

Island in Helsinki, Finland

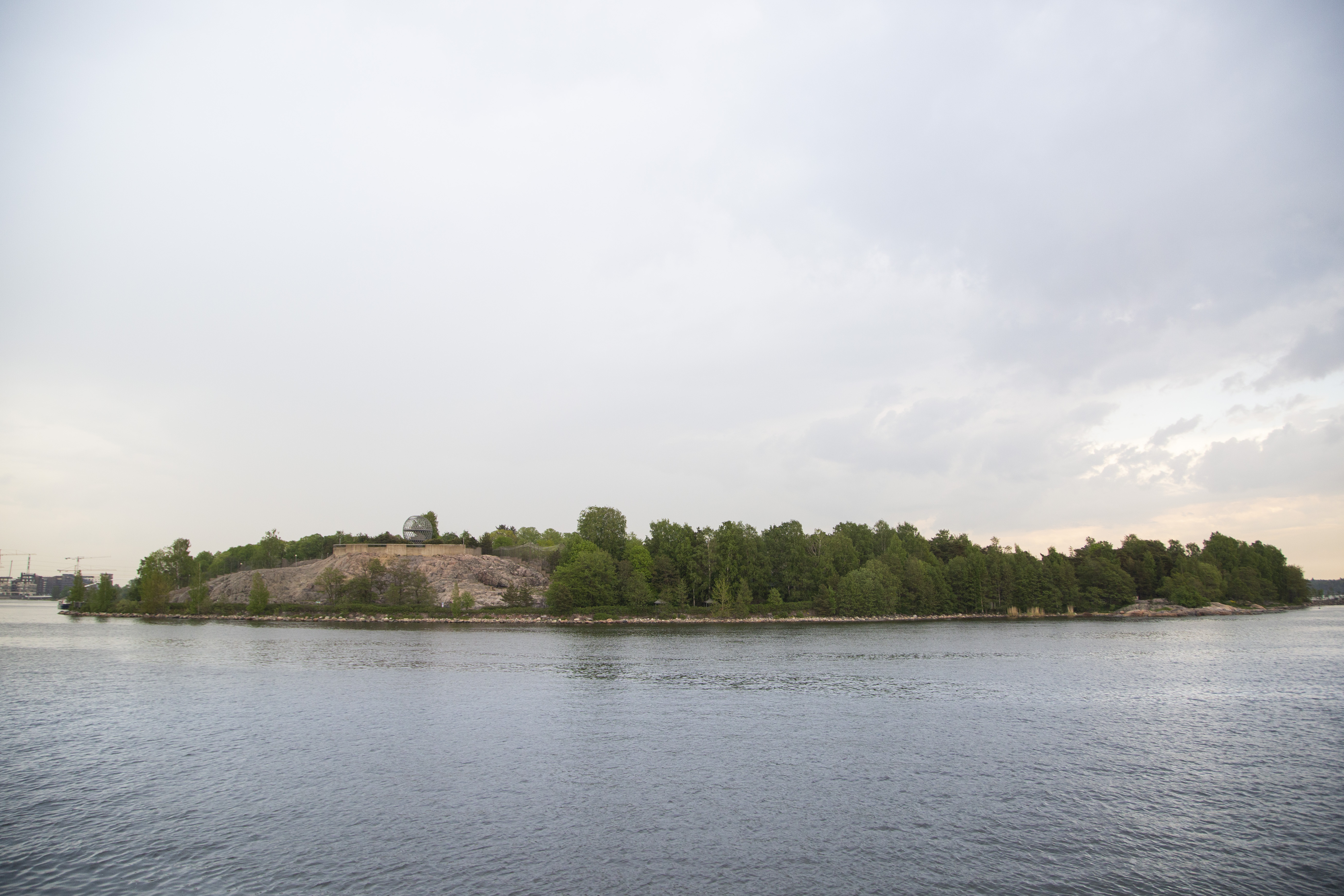
- Korkeasaari island as seen from the ferry.

- Korkeasaari is located near Helsinki city center.

Geography
- Location: Helsinki, Gulf of Finland
- Coordinates: 60.175°N 24.9842°E
- Area: 22 ha (54 acres)

Administration
- Finland

Korkeasaari (Swedish: Högholmen) is an island in Helsinki. The literal meaning of Korkeasaari is "Tall Island/Islet". It is part of the Mustikkamaa–Korkeasaari district. Korkeasaari Zoo is located on the island and named after it.

The island of Korkeasaari is a 22-hectare (54-acre) rocky island. Two smaller islands are located next to it: Hylkysaari and Palosaari.

== History ==
A sacrificial stone from the Bronze Age has been found on the island. It is the first one found in the Helsinki area.

Korkeasaari has been in recreational use for people living in Helsinki for a long time. Locals used it for fishing and for herding. After the Crimean War a steam boat started operating to the island, and the island became a popular place to spend time.

Korkeasaari was rented to Helsinki Liqoir Company Helsingfors Utskänkningsaktiebolag in 1883, and the company started renovating the island. Roads were built and city gardener L. A. Jernström planned planting areas to the island. A restaurant designed by Theodor Höijer was built in 1884, and it is still located on the island and used as a restaurant. In 1889 Korkeasaari Zoo was established and located to the island.

== Transportation ==
In 1972, a bridge was built to connect Korkeasaari to the mainland via Mustikkamaa. Before that, a ferry was the only option to arrive to the island.

The construction of the Crown Bridges started in 2021 and finished in 2026. The bridges connect Korkeasaari to Hakaniemi via Nihti, and to Laajasalo via the longest bridge in Finland. The bridges will also bring a tram connection to the island.

== Gallery ==
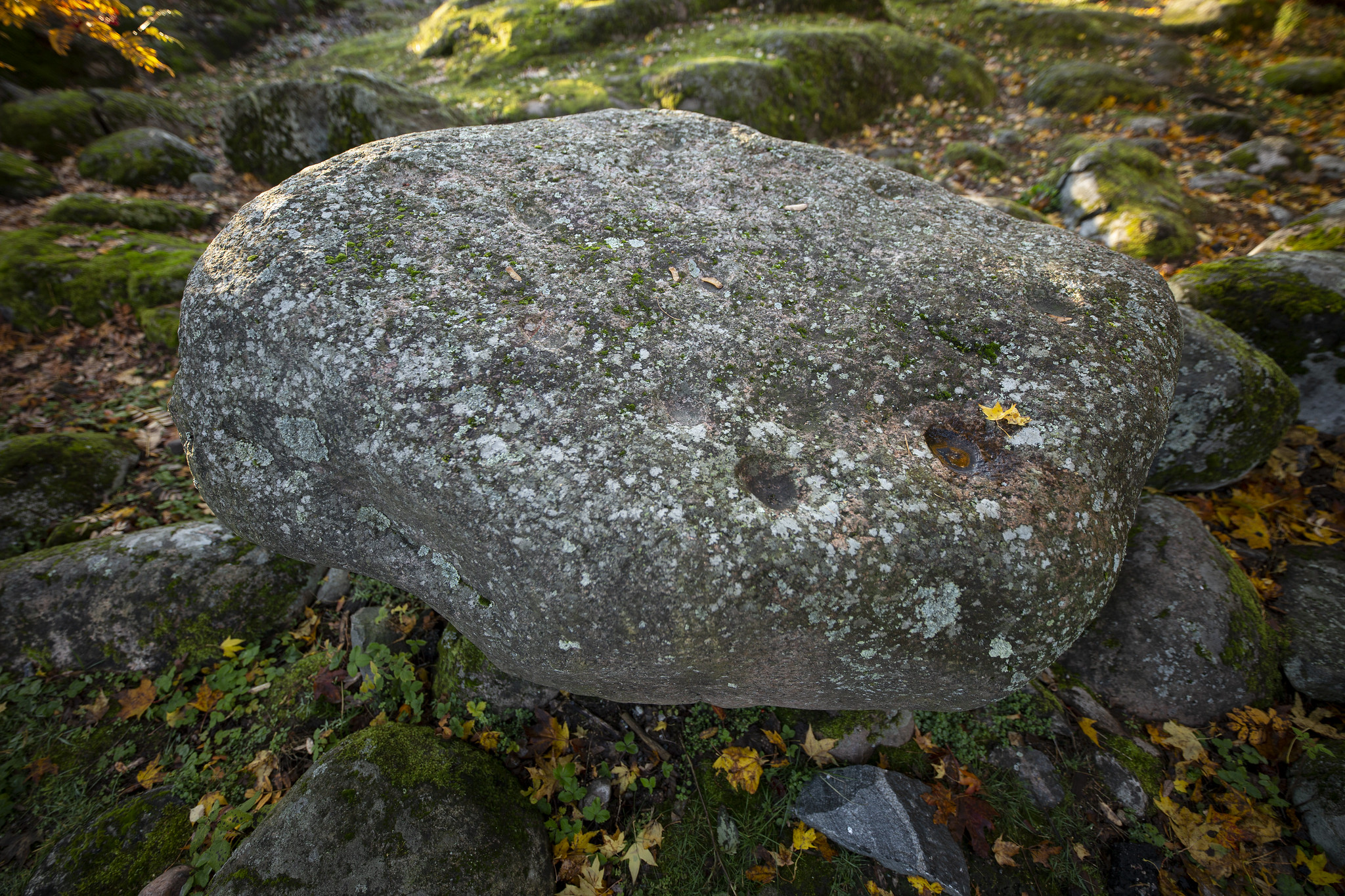
Sacrificial stone in Korkeasaari

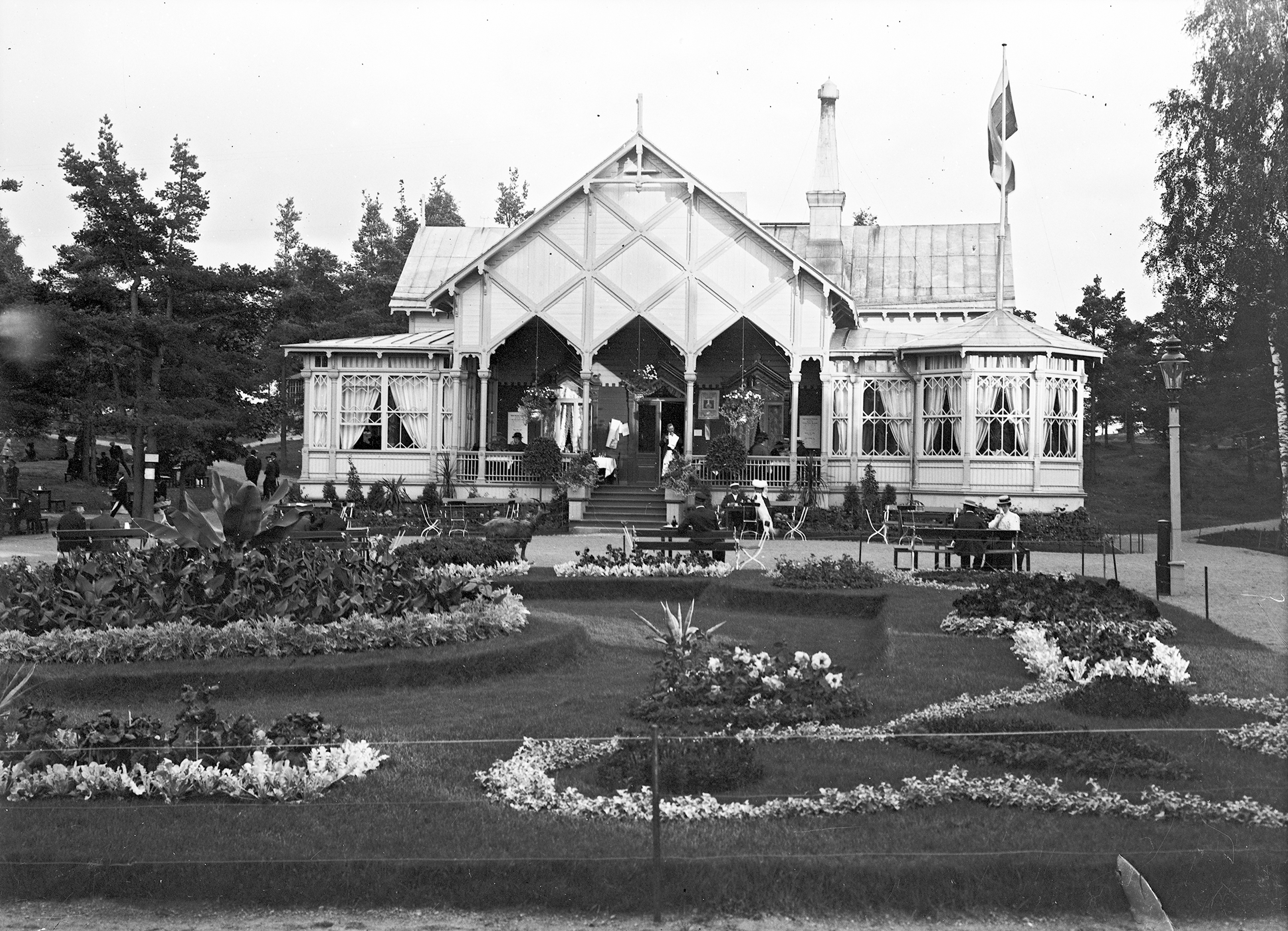
Restaurant designed by Theodor Höijer, photographed in the 1900s.

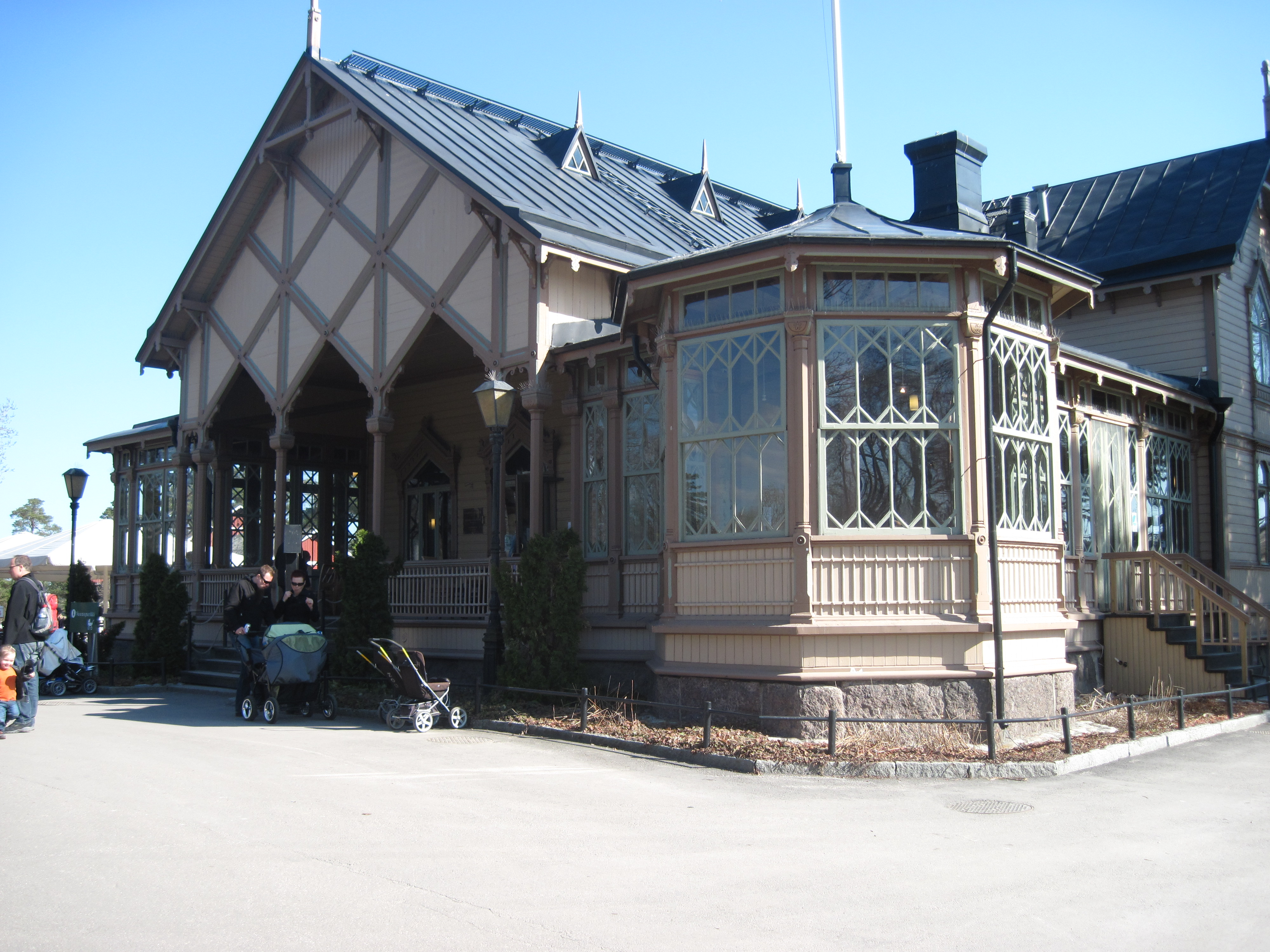
The same restaurant building, still in use.

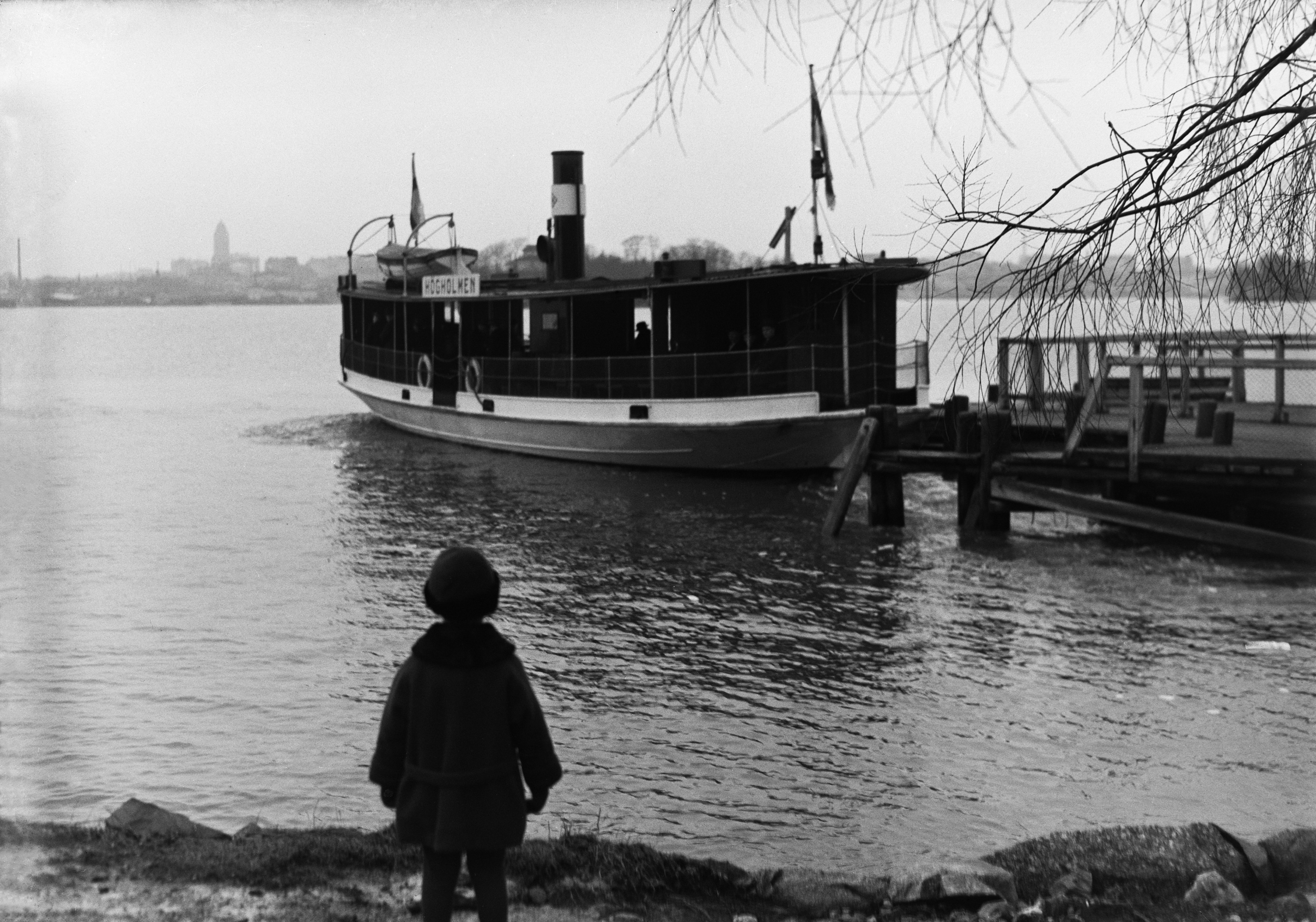
Ferry to the Zoo in the 1920s.

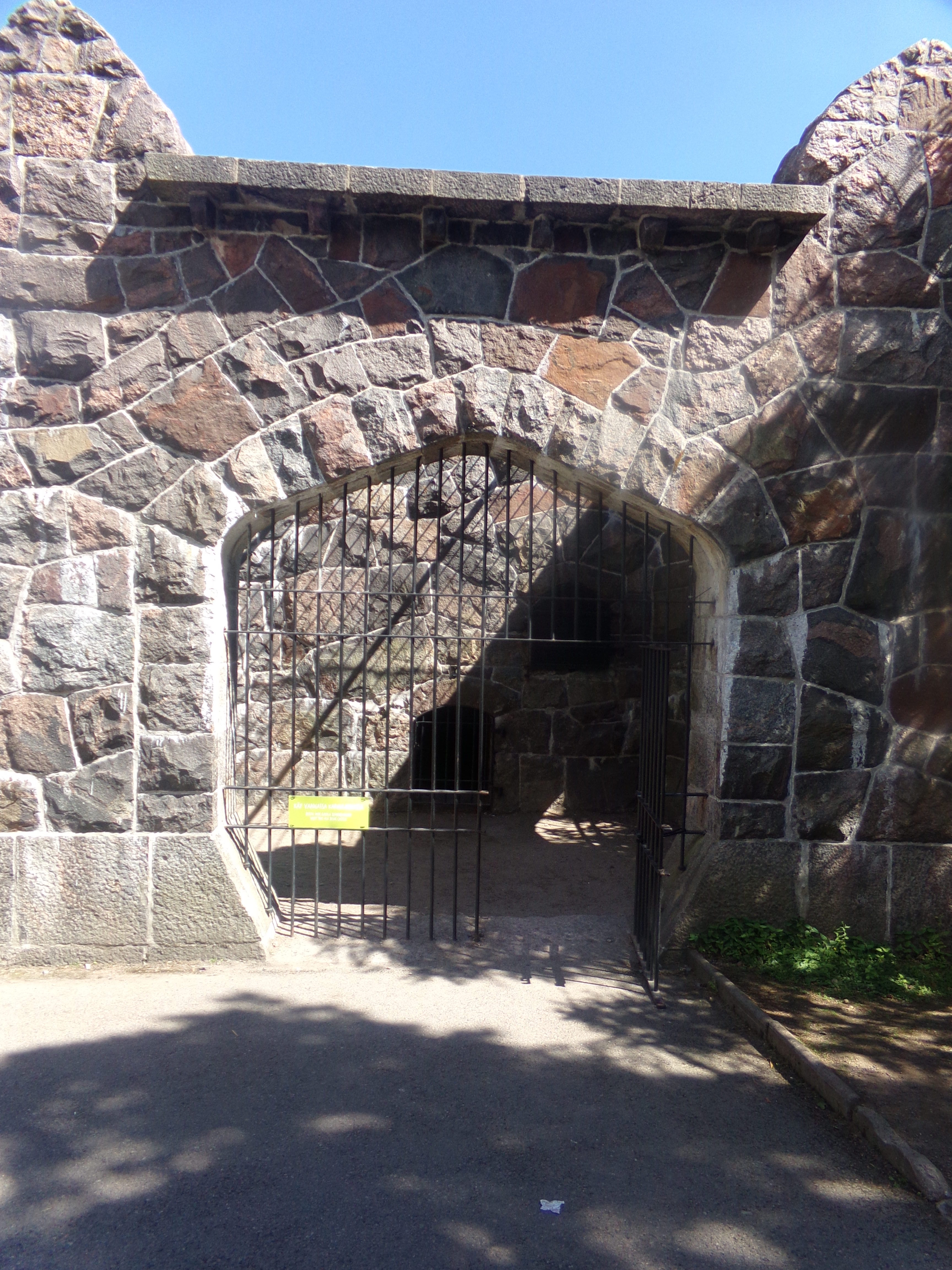
Old Bear Castle still located in the zoo, but not in use.

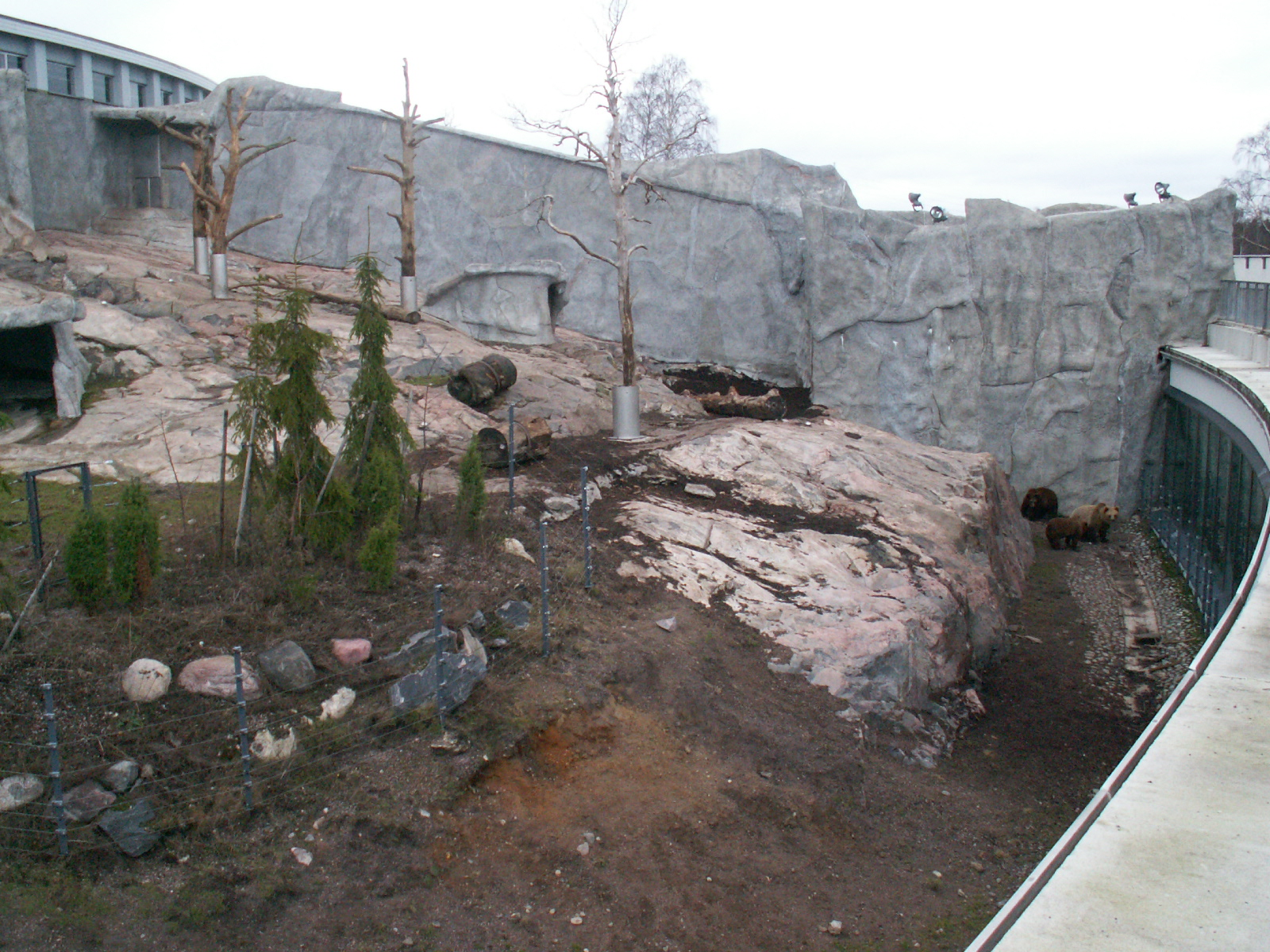
Current Bear Castle in the Zoo.

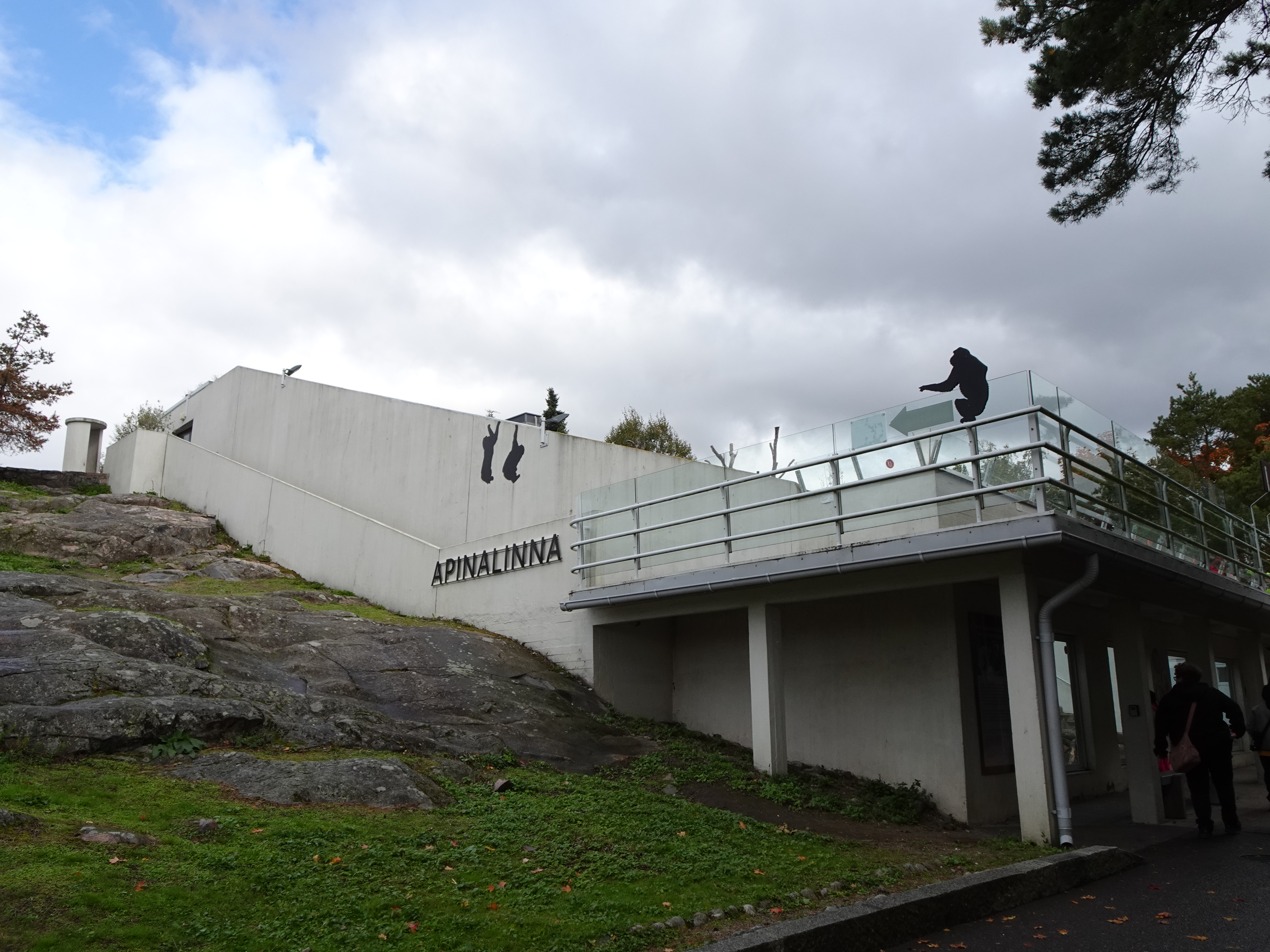
Current Monkey Castle in the Zoo.

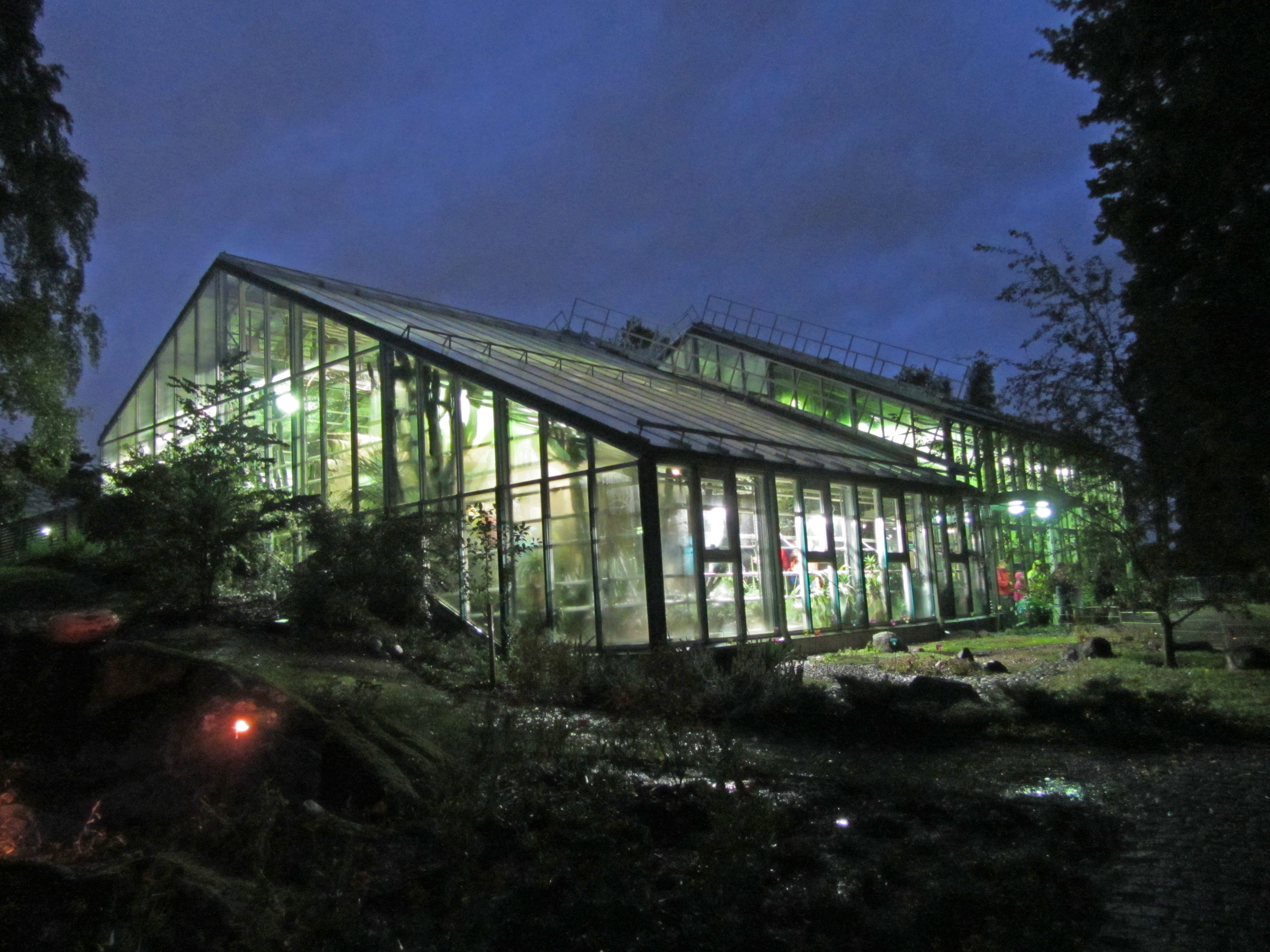
Modern tropical building Africasia, built in 2003.

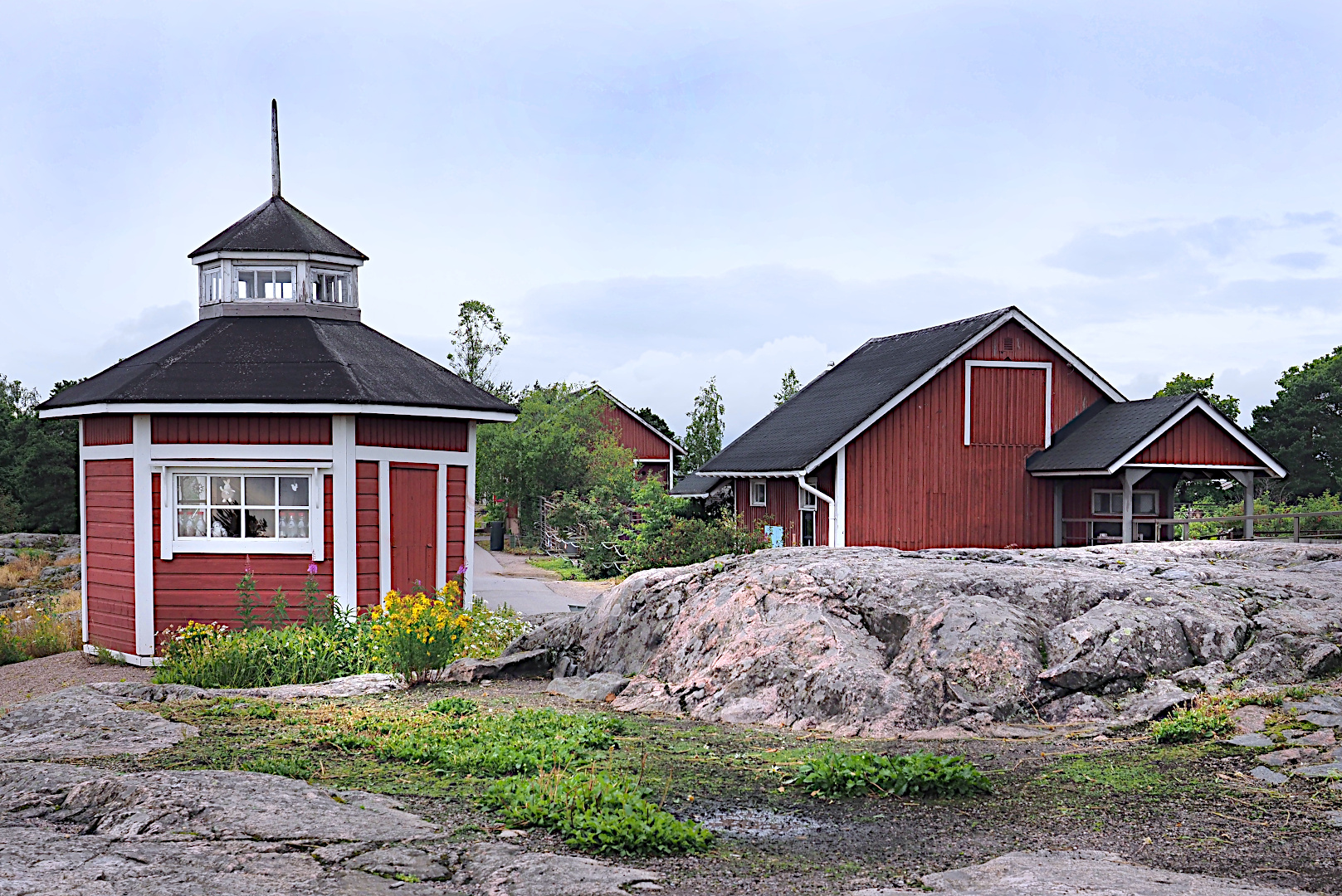
Old architecture can still be found at the zoo.

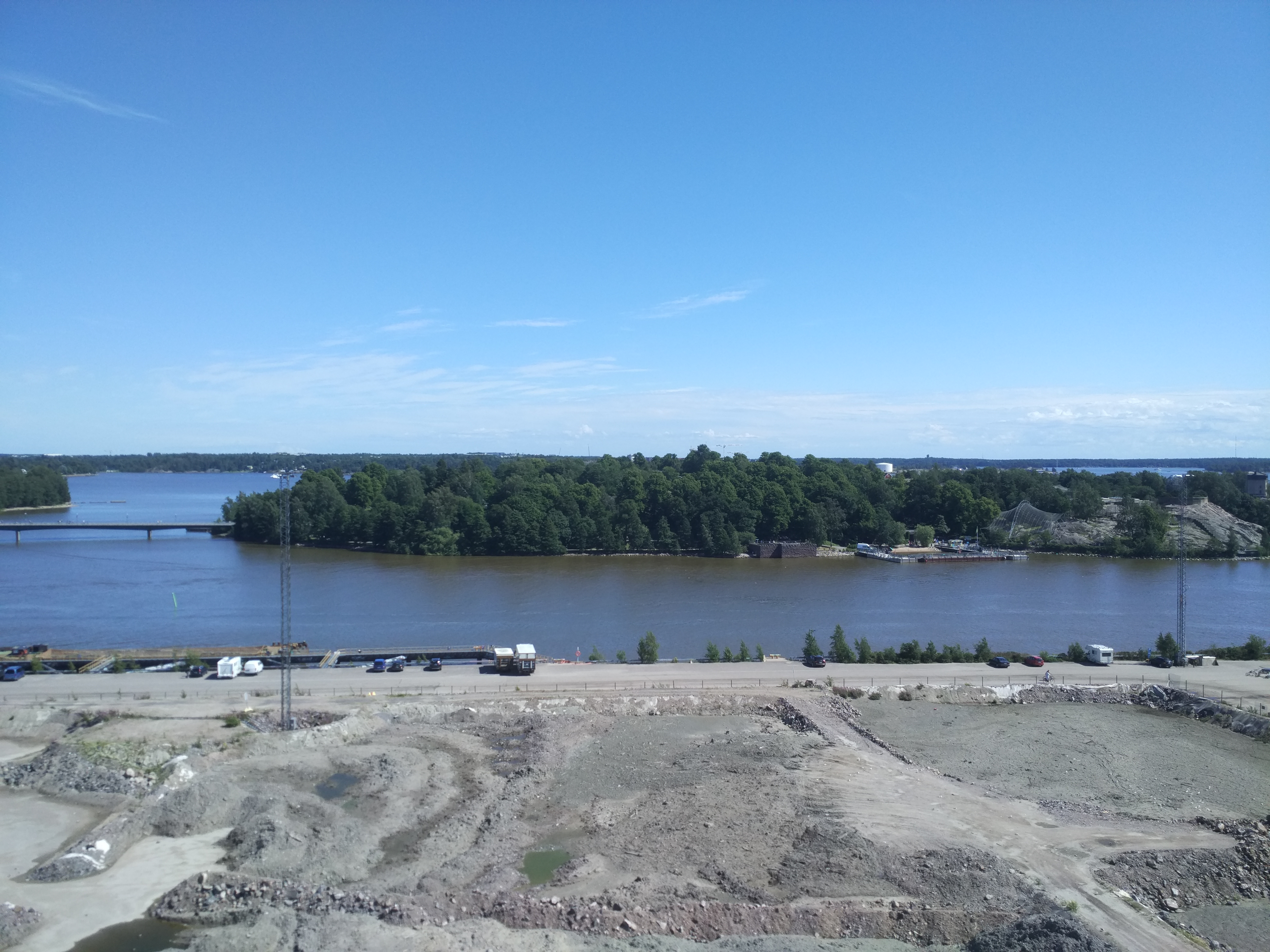
Bridge that connects Korkeasaari to Mustikkamaa.

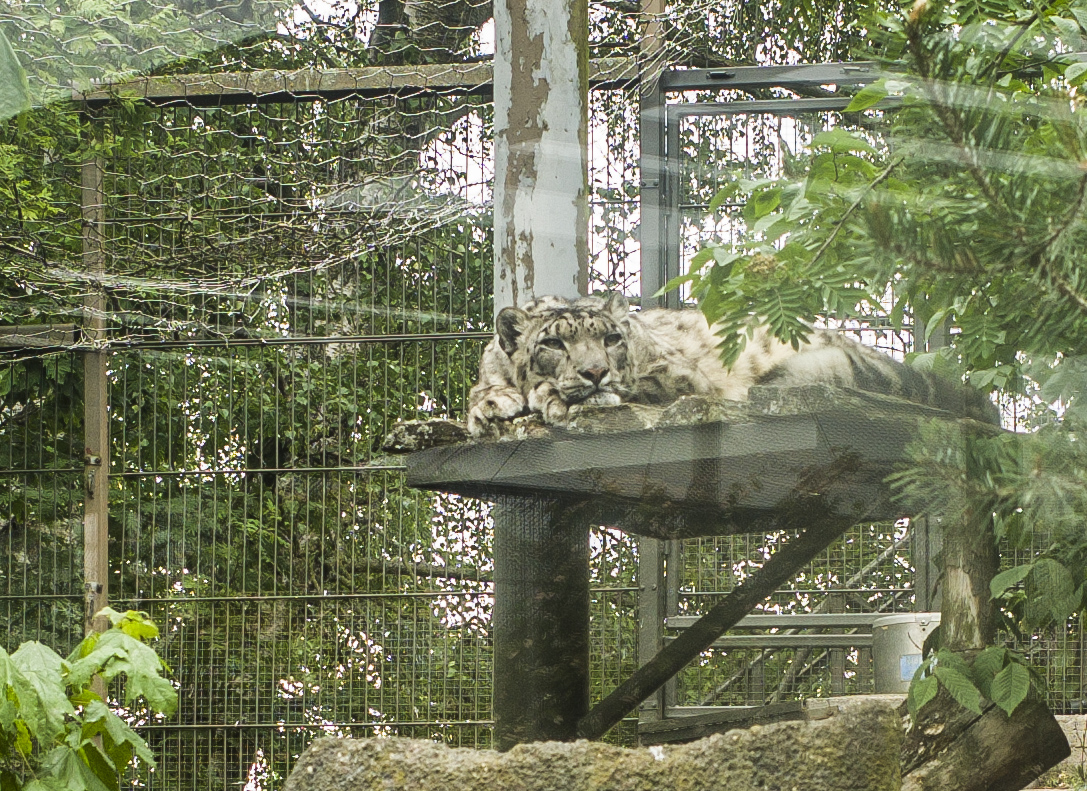
Snow leopard at the zoo
