= List of bridges in Finland =

This is a list of bridges and viaducts in Finland, including those for pedestrians and vehicular traffic.

== Historical and architectural interest bridges ==
The museum roads and bridges was established by the Finnish Road Administration (Finnish: Tiehallinto) that belongs to the Finnish Transport Infrastructure Agency, in order to preserve the most historically valuable and representative parts of the road network as museum objects. There is a total of 22 roads (35 kilometres (22 mi)) and 37 bridges in the museum object collection.

	Name	Finnish	Distinction	Length	Type	Carries Crosses	Opened	Location	Region	Ref.
1	Tuovila Bridge	Tuovilan silta	Oldest road bridge still in use in Finland; Listed bridge Museosilta No. 40	93 m (305 ft)	Masonry; 3 arches	Road bridge Laihianjoki	1781	Vaasa; 63°01′47.4″N 21°48′18.9″E	Ostrobothnia	
2	Etelänkylä Grand Bridge	Etelänkylän isosilta	Oldest wooden bridge still in use in Finland; Listed bridge Museosilta No. 45	77 m (253 ft)	Beam bridge Wooden strut framed bridge, masonry piers	Road bridge Pyhäjoki (river)	1837	Pyhäjoki; 64°27′29.1″N 24°14′29.9″E	North Ostrobothnia	
3	Old Haliko Bridge	Halikon vanha silta	Listed bridge Museosilta No. 9	75 m (246 ft)	Beam bridge Wooden strut framed bridge, masonry abutments	Former road bridge Halikonjoki	1866	Halikko; 60°23′50.6″N 23°04′09.1″E	Southwest Finland	
4	Tuira Bridge demolished in 1948	Tuiran silta	Span : 45 m (148 ft)		Arch; Wooden deck arch	Road bridge Oulujoki	1867	Oulu; 65°01′16.4″N 25°28′03.8″E	North Ostrobothnia	
5	Vantaankoski Bridge	Vantaankosken silta			Beam bridge Wooden strut framed bridge, masonry abutments	Road bridge Vantaa (river)	1876	Vantaa; 60°17′37.2″N 24°51′57.6″E	Uusimaa	
6	Pattijoki Bridge	Pattijoen silta	Listed bridge Museosilta No. 42	10 m (33 ft)	Masonry; 1 arch	Road bridge Pattijoki	1897	Pattijoki; 64°41′34.4″N 24°34′18.2″E	North Ostrobothnia	
7	Aunes Bridge	Aunessilta	Listed bridge Museosilta No. 17	46 m (151 ft)	Masonry; 1 arch	Former road bridge Aunessillansalmi	1899	Kämmenniemi; 61°37′51.5″N 23°50′15.2″E	Pirkanmaa	
8	Savukoski Bridge	Savukosken silta	Listed bridge Museosilta No. 21	60 m (200 ft)	Arch; Concrete tied arch	Former road bridge Kymi (river)	1927	Loviisa–Pyhtää; 60°17′37.2″N 24°51′57.6″E	Uusimaa; Kymenlaakso	
9	Ponkila Bridge	Ponkilan silta	Listed bridge Museosilta No. 43	71 m (233 ft)	Suspension; Steel deck and pylons	Road bridge Muhosjoki	1931	Muhos; 64°48′32.3″N 26°00′18.6″E	North Ostrobothnia	
10	Voikkaa old railway bridge	Voikkaan vanha rautatiesilta			Truss; Steel deck	footbridge Former railway bridge Kymi (river)	1940	Kuusankoski	Kymenlaakso	
11	Säpilä Suspension Bridge	Säpilän riippusilta	Span : 127 m (417 ft)	164 m (538 ft)	Suspension; Steel, wooden deck	Footbridge; Kokemäenjoki	1950	Kokemäki; 61°18′26.1″N 22°23′07.9″E	Satakunta	
12	Ahmaskoski Bridge	Ahmaskosken silta	Span : 100 m (330 ft)	100 m (330 ft)	Suspension; Steel, wooden deck	Footbridge; Oulujoki	1957	Utajärvi; 64°38′34.5″N 26°34′23.8″E	North Ostrobothnia	
13	Mylly Bridge	Myllysilta	Listed bridge Museosilta No. 5	51 m (167 ft)	Beam bridge Wooden strut framed bridge, wooden piers	Vantaa (river)	1966	Nurmijärvi; 60°27′19.5″N 24°51′07.3″E	Uusimaa	
14	Ylistö Bridge	Ylistön silta	Span : 112 m (367 ft)	208 m (682 ft)	Cable-stayed; Composite steel/concrete deck, steel pylons	Footbridge; Lake Jyväsjärvi	1992	Jyväskylä; 62°13′47.4″N 25°44′13.1″E	Central Finland	
15	Vihantasalmi Bridge	Vihantasalmen silta		182 m (597 ft)	Truss; Glued laminated timber	Road bridge National road 5 Lake Lahnavesi	1999	Mäntyharju; 61°26′24.9″N 26°40′35.6″E	South Savo	
16	Laukonsilta	Laukonsilta		150 m (490 ft)	Cable-stayed; Concrete deck, 1 steel pylon	Footbridge; Tammerkoski	2010	Tampere; 61°29′37.6″N 23°45′37.6″E	Pirkanmaa	
17	Crusell Bridge	Crusellinsilta	Span : 92 m (302 ft)	173 m (568 ft)	Cable-stayed; Composite steel/concrete deck, 1 steel pylon	Road bridge Helsinki tram (Line 8); Ruoholahti	2011	Helsinki; 60°09′37.3″N 24°54′30.0″E	Uusimaa	
18	Isoisänsilta	Isoisänsilta	Span : 144 m (472 ft)	170 m (560 ft)	Arch; Steel through arch	Footbridge; Kruunuvuorenselkä	2016	Helsinki; 60°10′55.3″N 24°58′57.9″E	Uusimaa	

== Major road and railway bridges ==
This table presents the structures with spans greater than 100 meters (non-exhaustive list).

	Name	Finnish	Span	Length	Type	Carries Crosses	Opened	Location	Region	Ref.
1	Kruunuvuori Bridge; Crown Bridges	Kruunuvuorensilta	260 m (850 ft)(x2)	1,191 m (3,907 ft)	Cable-stayed; Composite steel/concrete deck, 1 concrete pylon 260+260	Helsinki tram (Lines 11 and 12); Kruunuvuorenselkä	2026	Helsinki–Laajasalo; 60°10′26.3″N 25°00′08.8″E	Uusimaa	
2	Replot Bridge	Raippaluodon silta	250 m (820 ft)	1,045 m (3,428 ft)	Cable-stayed; Steel deck, concrete pylons	Regional road 724; Gulf of Bothnia	1997	Replot–Vaasa; 63°12′24.3″N 21°28′24.6″E	Ostrobothnia	
3	New Kirjalansalmi Bridge	Kirjalansalmen uusi silta	265 m (869 ft)	675 m (2,215 ft)	Cable-stayed; Composite steel/concrete deck, concrete pylons 100+250+100	Regional road 180; Kirjalansalmi	2025	Kaarina–Pargas; 60°21′57.5″N 22°21′33.7″E	Southwest Finland	
4	Kärkisten Bridge	Kärkisten silta	240 m (790 ft)	787 m (2,582 ft)	Cable-stayed; Steel deck, concrete pylons 9x42+240+3x42	Regional road 610; Lake Päijänne	1997	Korpilahti; 61°59′54.2″N 25°40′35.0″E	Central Finland	
5	Kirjalansalmi Bridge	Kirjalansalmen silta	220 m (720 ft)	287 m (942 ft)	Suspension; Steel truss deck, steel pylons 25+220+25	Regional road 180; Kirjalansalmi	1963	Kaarina–Pargas; 60°21′57.5″N 22°21′30.4″E	Southwest Finland	
6	Tähtiniemi Bridge	Tähtiniemen silta	165 m (541 ft)	924 m (3,031 ft)	Cable-stayed; Steel deck, 1 steel pylon	National road 4 European route E75; Lake Ruotsalainen	1993	Heinola; 61°12′48.0″N 26°00′28.3″E	Päijät-Häme	
7	Sääksmäki Bridge	Sääksmäen silta	155 m (509 ft)		Suspension; Steel girder deck, steel pylons 30+155+30	Regional road 130; Lake Vanajavesi	1963	Sääksmäki; 61°11′02.7″N 24°02′54.3″E	Pirkanmaa	
8	Sami Bridge	Saamen silta	155 m (509 ft)	316 m (1,037 ft)	Cable-stayed; Steel deck, steel pylons	National road 4 European route E75; Tana	1993	Utsjoki–Tana; 69°54′38.8″N 27°01′55.1″E	Lapland; Norway	
9	Louhunsalmi Bridge	Louhunsalmen riippusilta	140 m (460 ft)	178 m (584 ft)	Suspension; Steel girder deck, steel pylons 15+18+140	Road bridge Lake Päijänne	1957	Säynätsalo Island–Lehtisaari Island; 62°08′05.3″N 25°45′41.9″E	Central Finland	
10	Saimaa Bridge	Saimaan silta	140 m (460 ft)	762 m (2,500 ft)	Beam bridge Twin girder, composite steel/concrete 55+90+140+90+55	Principal road 62; Lake Saimaa; Puumalansalmen	1995	Puumala; 61°31′07.6″N 28°10′32.3″E	South Savo	
11	Kirkonvarkaus Bridge	Kirkonvarkauden silta	139 m (456 ft)		Suspension; Steel girder deck, steel pylons	Principal road 62; Ukonvesi	1967	Mikkeli; 61°39′55.5″N 27°17′49.2″E	South Savo	
12	Norrströmmen Bridge	Norrströmmenin silta	135 m (443 ft)	310 m (1,020 ft)	Box girder Prestressed concrete 30+80+135+65	Regional road 180; Norrströmmen	1988	Nagu–Lillandet; 60°10′48.9″N 21°55′51.7″E	Southwest Finland	
13	Färjsund Bridge	Färjsundin silta	130 m (430 ft)	200 m (660 ft)	Arch; Concrete deck arch	Road 2 Färjsundet	1938	Saltvik–Finström; 60°14′17.2″N 20°00′57.4″E	Åland	
14	Vehmersalmi Bridge	Vehmersalmen silta	130 m (430 ft)	387 m (1,270 ft)	Beam bridge Twin girder, composite steel/concrete	Regional road 536; Kallavesi; Suvasvesi	2001	Kuopio; 62°46′09.2″N 28°00′11.7″E	North Savo	
15	Lumberjack's Candle Bridge	Jätkänkynttilä	126 m (413 ft)	320 m (1,050 ft)	Cable-stayed; Steel box girder deck, concrete pylons 40+42+126+2x42	Principal road 78; Kemijoki	1989	Rovaniemi; 66°30′10.4″N 25°44′33.2″E	Lapland	
16	Hännilänsalmi Bridge dismantled in 2010	Hännilänsalmen riippusilta	125 m (410 ft)		Suspension; Steel girder deck, steel pylons	National road 4 European route E75; Lake Keitele	1962	Viitasaari; 63°02′33.7″N 25°49′02.2″E	Central Finland	
17	Lapinlahti Bridge	Lapinlahden silta	125 m (410 ft)(x3)	597 m (1,959 ft)	Beam bridge Steel; 103+3x125+103	Länsiväylä; National road 51; Lauttasaarensalmi	1965	Helsinki–Lauttasaari; 60°09′58.0″N 24°53′33.1″E	Uusimaa	
18	Karisalmi Bridge	Karisalmen silta	125 m (410 ft)		Suspension; Steel girder deck, steel pylons 25+125+25	Regional road 314; Lake Päijänne	1969	Asikkala; 61°17′34.4″N 25°31′58.2″E	Päijät-Häme	
19	Ison Pörrin Bridge	Ison-Pörrin silta	120 m (390 ft)	120 m (390 ft)	Arch; Steel tied arch Bow-string bridge	Principal road 69; Aatunselkä		Äänekoski; 62°32′17.4″N 25°49′56.0″E	Central Finland	
20	Luukkaansalmi Bridge	Luukkaansalmen silta	120 m (390 ft)	420 m (1,380 ft)	Beam bridge Twin girder, composite steel/concrete 60+90+120+90+60	Road 4081; Lake Saimaa	1989	Lappeenranta; 61°04′46.4″N 28°15′04.9″E	South Karelia	
21	Toijansalmi Bridge	Toijansalmen silta	120 m (390 ft)		Box girder Prestressed concrete	Road bridge Vehkasalonselkä	2004	Taipalsaari; 61°09′56.7″N 28°07′00.8″E	South Karelia	
22	New Jännevirta Bridge	Jännevirran uusi silta	120 m (390 ft)	577 m (1,893 ft)	Beam bridge Twin girder, composite steel/concrete 70+100+120+100+70	National road 9 Kallavesi; Juurusvesi–Akonvesi	2018	Kuopio; 62°58′16.1″N 27°49′47.6″E	North Savo	
23	Virta Bridge	Virran silta	114 m (374 ft)		Suspension; Steel girder deck, steel pylons	Regional road 362; Pyhäjärvi; Kirkkojärvi	1964	Iitti; 60°56′43.7″N 26°23′09.6″E	Kymenlaakso	
24	Lietvesi Bridge	Lietveden silta	112 m (367 ft)	288 m (945 ft)	Beam bridge Twin girder, composite steel/concrete 88+112+88	Principal road 62; Lake Saimaa; Puumalansalmen	1986	Puumala; 61°33′05.3″N 27°57′44.3″E	South Savo	
25	Hannula Bridge	Hannulan silta	108 m (354 ft)	252 m (827 ft)	Truss; Steel	Road bridge Torne (Finnish and Swedish river)	1939	Tornio; 65°50′48.7″N 24°09′23.7″E	Lapland	
26	Oulu Iron bridge	Rautasilta	100 m (330 ft)	115 m (377 ft)	Truss; Steel	Road bridge Oulujoki	1886	Oulu; 65°01′21.1″N 25°29′46.5″E	North Ostrobothnia	
27	Jännevirta Bridge dismantled in 2018	Jännevirran silta	100 m (330 ft)	226 m (741 ft)	Arch; Steel tied arch Bow-string bridge	National road 9 Kallavesi; Juurusvesi–Akonvesi	1951	Kuopio; 62°58′17.3″N 27°49′48.7″E	North Savo	

== Alphabetical list ==
- Bomarsund Bridge - Sund
- Crusell Bridge - Helsinki
- Erkkolan silta
- Etelänkylän isosilta
- Hakaniemen silta
- Hämeensilta
- Isoisänsilta
- Jänhijoki railway bridge
- Joutsensilta
- Kaitaisten silta
- Kallansillat
- Kiskopolun silta
- Kulosaaren silta
- Kuokkala Bridge - Jyväskylä
- Kärkisten silta
- Kvarken Bridge
- Lapinlahden silta
- Laukan silta
- Louhunsalmen riippusilta
- Martinsilta
- Myllysilta
- Möljä Bridge
- Ounaskosken rautatie- ja maantiesilta
- Pitkäsilta
- Ponkilan silta
- Porin silta
- Replot Bridge
- Rokkiporkkana
- Sami Bridge
- Sangin silta
- Satakunnansilta
- Savisilta
- Sääksmäen silta
- Tuiran sillat
- Tähtiniemi Bridge
- Ukkopekan silta
- Vuolteensilta
- Vuosaaren silta

== Notes and references ==
- "Suomen sillat - sivusto". Torsti.pp.fi - Bridges in Finland (in Finnish). Archived from the original on 24 June 2016.
- Nicolas Janberg. "International Database for Civil and Structural Engineering". Structurae.com.
- Others references

== See also ==
- Transport in Finland
- Roads in Finland
- Highways in Finland
- Rail transport in Finland
- Geography of Finland
- List of rivers of Finland
- fi:Museosilta (in Finnish) - Museum bridge
