= Kuokkala =

Kuokkala may refer to:

- Kuokkala, Jyväskylä, a ward in Jyväskylä, Finland
- Kuokkala (district of Jyväskylä), a district within the ward
- Kuokkala Bridge in Jyväskylä
- Kuokkala, Lempäälä, a neighbourhood in Lempäälä, Finland
- Repino, a municipal settlement in Saint Petersburg, Russia; formerly known as Kuokkala (when it was in Finland)
