= Martinsilta =

Beam bridge spanning the Aurajoki river in Turku, Finland

Coordinates: 60°26′40.3″N 022°15′19.7″E

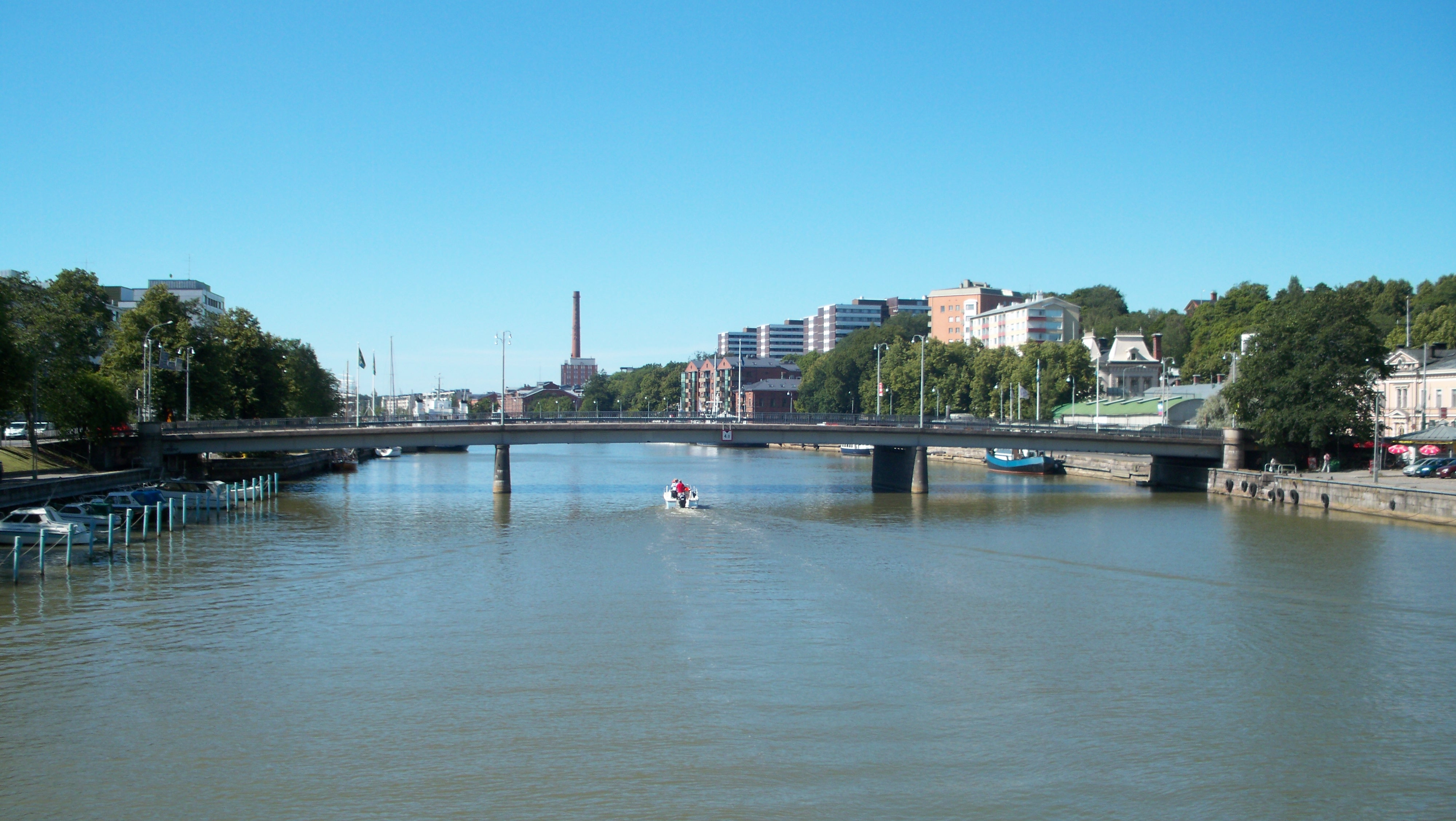
Martinsilta, Turku

Martinsilta (St. Martin's Bridge) (Swedish: Martinsbron) is a beam bridge spanning the Aurajoki river in Turku, Finland. It was built in 1940, although a proposed bridge appeared on its present location already in the city plan that Carl Ludvig Engel created after the Great Fire of Turku of 1827. The bridge is 104.5 metres (343 ft) in length.

The bridge is a one-way bridge crossing from Linnankatu to Itäinen Rantakatu in a south-southeast direction. The nearby Myllysilta bridge carries one-way traffic in the opposite direction. In 2010, due to the collapse of the Myllysilta bridge, Martinsilta was temporarily turned into a two-way bridge until Myllysilta was rebuilt and opened to traffic.
