= Kuokkala Bridge =

Kuokkala Bridge Kuokkalan Silta
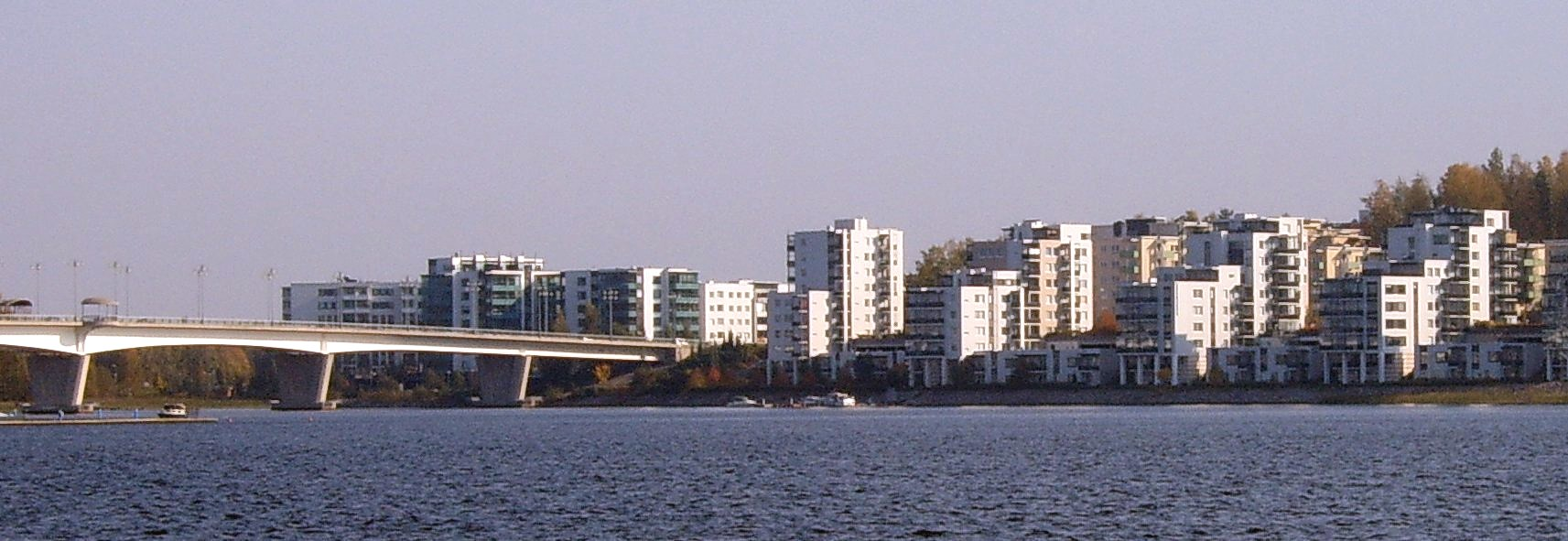
- The Kuokkala Bridge and buildings of Ainolanranta.
- Coordinates: 62°14′04″N 025°45′52″E
- Crosses: Jyväsjärvi
- Locale: Jyväskylä

Characteristics
- Total length: 480 m (1,570 ft)
- Width: 15.5 m (51 ft)
- Height: 11 m (36 ft)

History
- Construction end: 1989

Kuokkala Bridge (Finnish: Kuokkalan silta) is a bridge in Jyväskylä, Finland over the lake Jyväsjärvi. When the city of Jyväskylä expanded into Kuokkala, the eastern part of the town, it was deemed necessary to link the city centre to the new neighbourhood through a new bridge.

During the summer of 1977, three main options were considered: a continuation at the bottom of Vaasankatu to Kylmänoro, and two different paths from the southernmost edge of Lutakko, to Ainola and Peltoniemi. The last of these options was chosen on 26 September 1977 by the city council. The design work started in 1979, the main concern being the muddy lake bottom. The city council approved the new bridge, an arch joining the tip of Lutakko to Peltoniemi in Kuokkala, on 11 April 1983.

Work started on the bridge on 15 October 1987. The bridge was built from both directions, with the two sides joining on 12 September 1988. The bridge was officially named "Kuokkalan silta" on 11 September 1989, following a naming competition and a first proposal of "Aallon silta" on 5 March 1987. When the 480-metre-long (1,570 ft) bridge was officially opened on 23 October 1989, it was Finland's fourth longest road bridge and the longest plate girder bridge.

== See also ==
- List of bridges in Finland
