= Rui'an Bridge =

Bridge in Rui'an, Zhejiang, China

Rui'an Bridge 瑞安大桥(飞云江三桥)
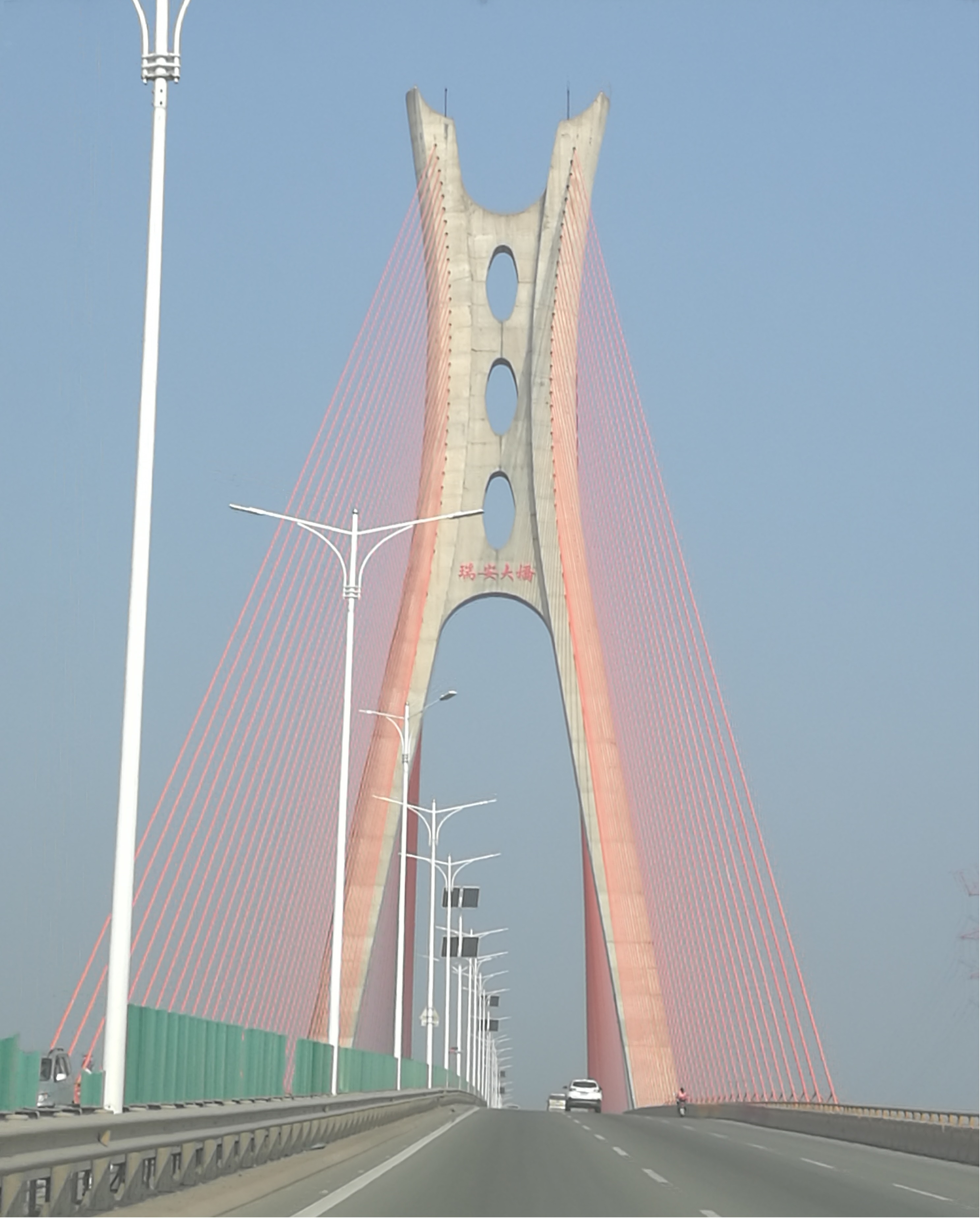
- View of Feiyunjiang Bridge
- Coordinates: 27.73°N 120.66°E
- Locale: Rui'an, Zhejiang, China
- Other name: Feiyunjiang 3.rd Bridge

Characteristics
- Design: Cable-stayed bridge
- Total length: 2,956 metres (9,698 ft)
- Width: 36.8 metres (121 ft)
- Height: 162.11 metres (531.9 ft)

History
- Construction start: 2003
- Construction end: 2008
- Opened: 2009

Location
- Interactive map of Rui'an Bridge

Rui'an bridge (Chinese: 瑞安大桥; pinyin: Ruì'ān Dàqiáo) is a Cable-stayed bridge in Rui'an, Zhejiang, which spans the Feiyun River. The bridge's construction was a component of the upgrade project of China National Highway 104 Zhejiang portion. Construction started in 2003, and the bridge was officially opened in early 2009. The bridge is 2,956 metres (9,698 ft) long, and 36.8 metres (121 ft) wide.
