= Kuokkala, Jyväskylä =

Ward of Jyväskylä, Finland

Coordinates: 62°13′22″N 25°46′39″E

Kuokkala
- Ward of Jyväskylä
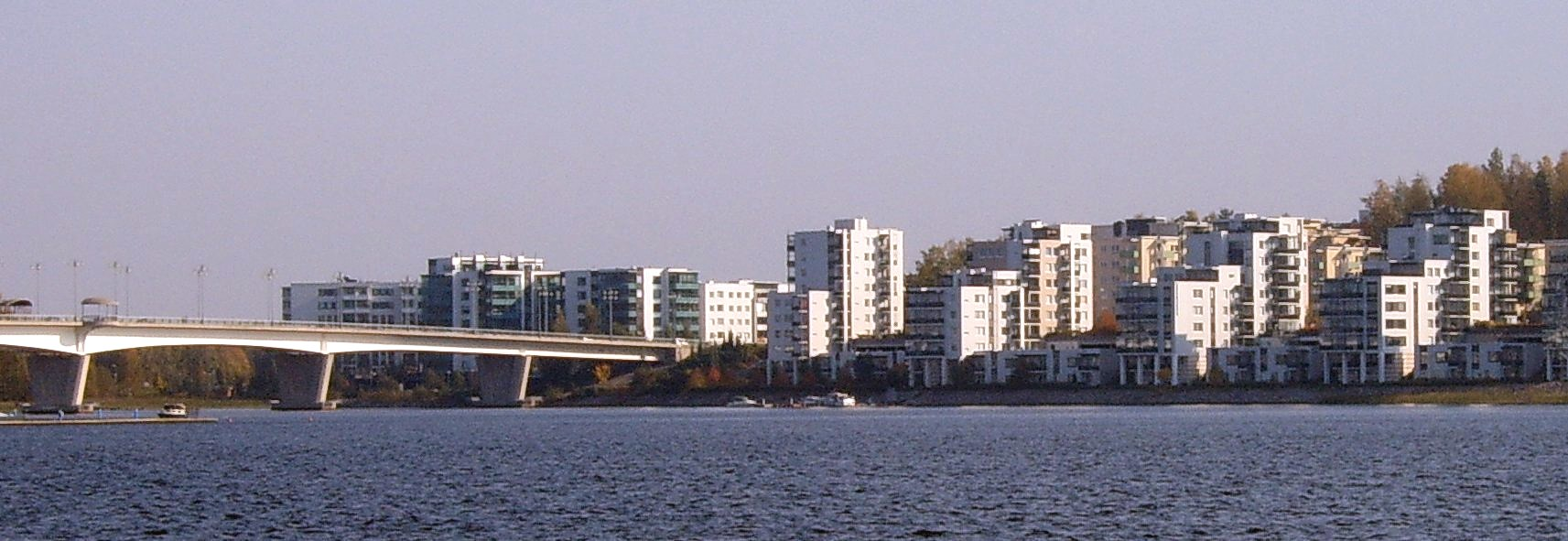
- Kuokkala Bridge connects the district to the downtown
- Country: Finland
- Province: Western Finland
- Region: Central Finland
- Sub-region: Jyväskylä sub-region
- City: Jyväskylä
- Ward: Kuokkala

Area
  - Total: 1,200 ha (3,000 acres)

Population (2012)
  - Total: 17,000
- Time zone: UTC+2 (EET)
  - Summer (DST): UTC+3 (EEST)
- Postal code: 40520 JYVÄSKYLÄ

Kuokkala is a ward of Jyväskylä, Finland. It contains six districts: Ristonmaa, Kuokkala, Kuokkalanpelto, Ristikivi, Nenäinniemi and Hämeenlahti. As of December 2023, 18,256 people live in Kuokkala.

The Kuokkala ward is separated from the Jyväskylä city centre by the Lake Jyväsjärvi and is joined to Lutakko by the Kuokkala Bridge. Additionally, it is delimited by the National road 9 on the west, lake Päijänne on the east and the south, and the Äijälänsalmi strait between the two lakes.

== History ==
Kuokkala was consolidated to Jyväskylä on 1 January 1965. Before that it was a part of Jyväskylän maalaiskunta. Planning started in 1973. The construction of residential buildings started in 1981.

A housing fair was held in 1985 in Kuokkala, which received 200.000 visitors.

The Kuokkala bridge was built between 1987 and 1989.

== Districts ==
=== Kuokkala ===
Kuokkala
- District of Jyväskylä
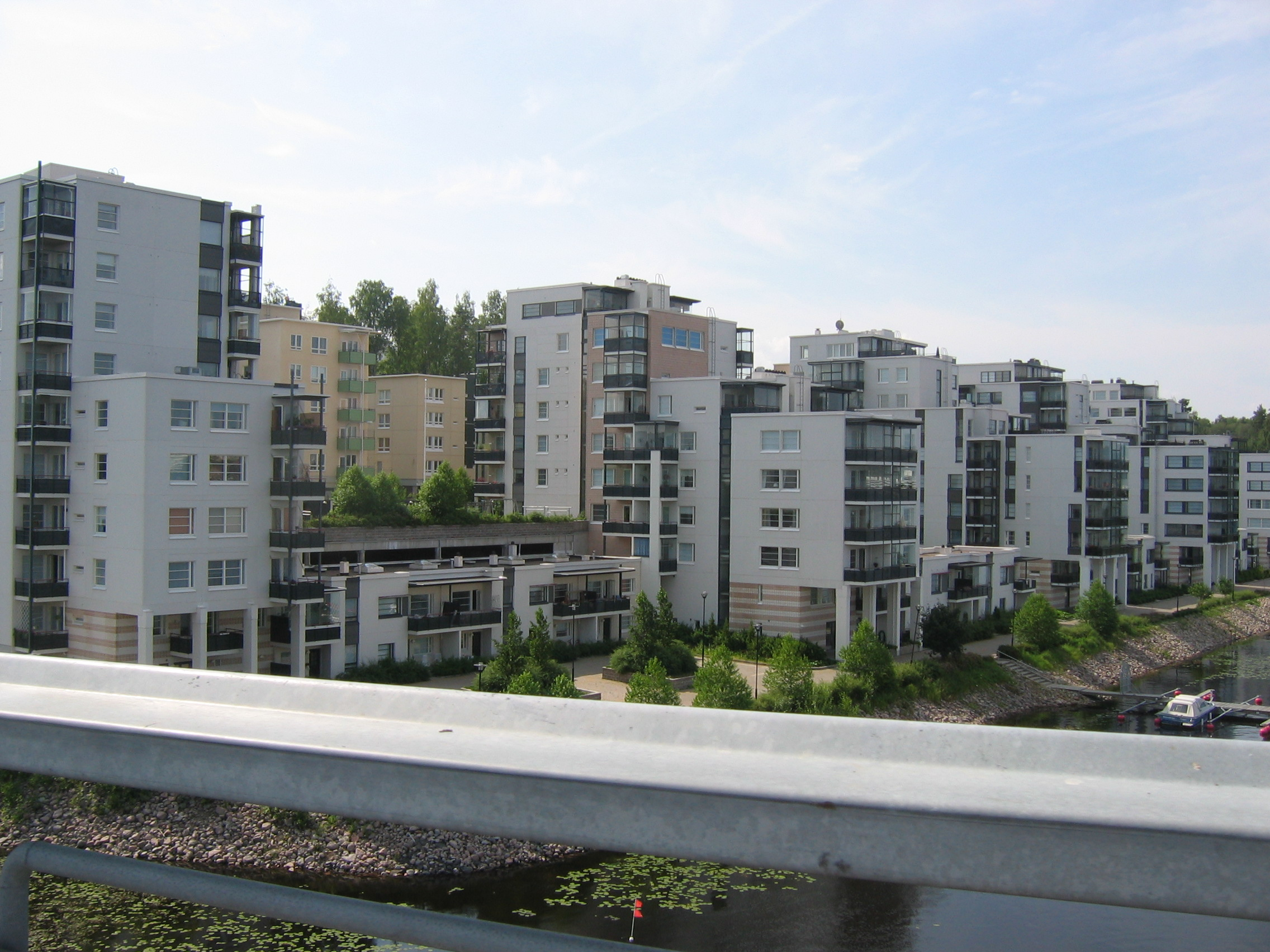
- Ainolanranta pictured from the Kuokkala Bridge
- Country: Finland
- Province: Western Finland
- Region: Central Finland
- Sub-region: Jyväskylä sub-region
- City: Jyväskylä
- Ward: Kuokkala
- Time zone: UTC+2 (EET)
  - Summer (DST): UTC+3 (EEST)
- Postal code: 40520 JYVÄSKYLÄ

Kuokkala is one of the districts of Jyväskylä, Finland. It's a part of the Kuokkala ward. The district is separated from the Jyväskylä downtown by the Lake Jyväsjärvi and is joined to Lutakko by the Kuokkala Bridge. Kuokkalan keskusta, Ainolanranta, Suuruspää, Asuntomessualue, Kekkola, Tikka, Pohjanlampi, Keskinen are the subareas of Kuokkala.

Kuokkala has several services such as a school, a health center, a convenience store and a church.

==== History ====
The construction of residential buildings in Kuokkala started in the 1980s. The Kuokkala bridge was built in 1989.

=== Ristikivi ===
Ristikivi
- District of Jyväskylä
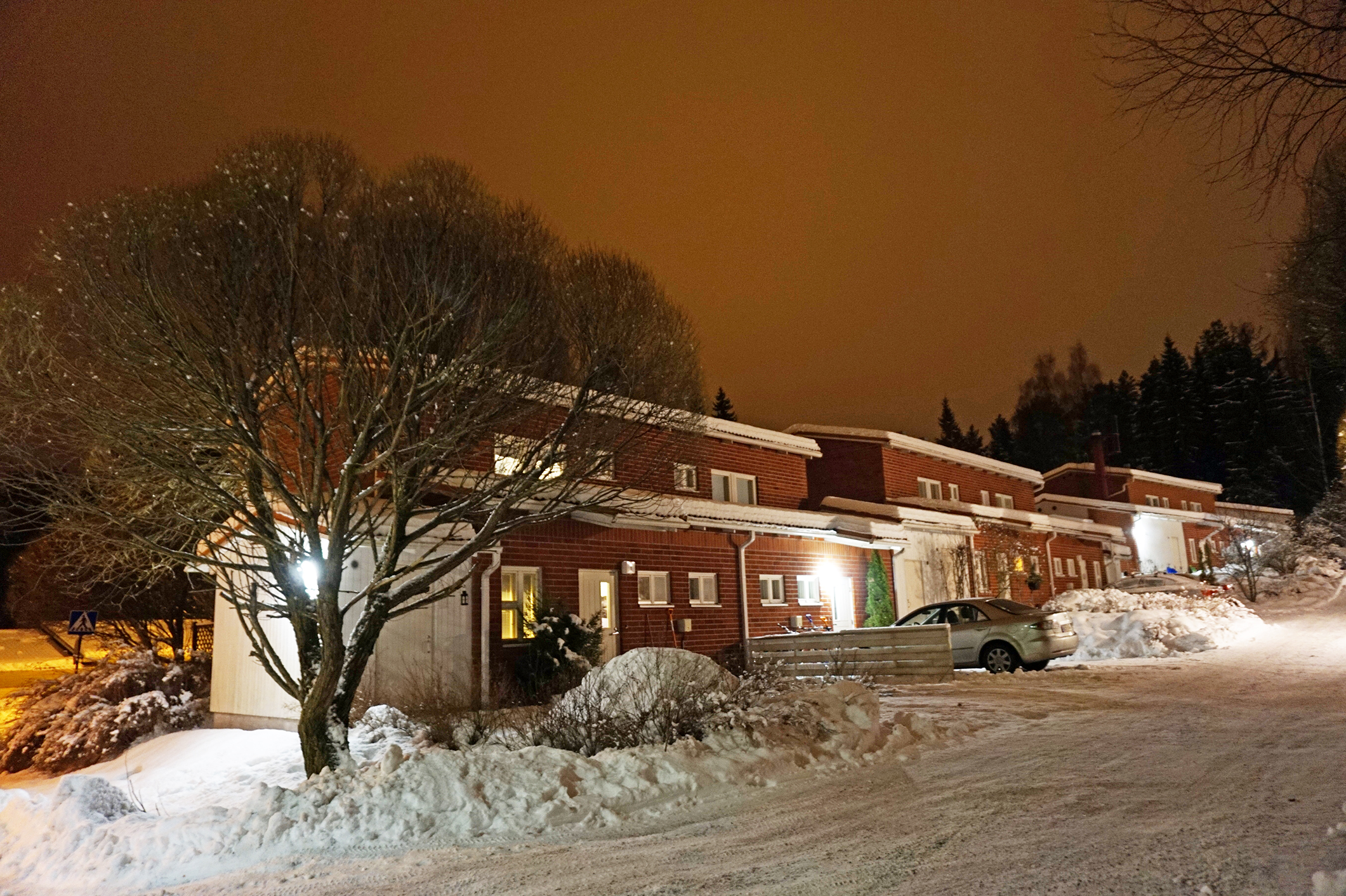
- Country: Finland
- Province: Western Finland
- Region: Central Finland
- Sub-region: Jyväskylä sub-region
- City: Jyväskylä
- Ward: Kuokkala
- Time zone: UTC+2 (EET)
  - Summer (DST): UTC+3 (EEST)
- Postal code: 40520 JYVÄSKYLÄ

Ristikivi is a district of Jyväskylä, Finland. It is located on a peninsula of the Lake Päijänne and is part of the ward of Kuokkala. The buildings of Ristikivi are mostly row houses and single-family houses built in the 1980s. There is a preschool located in the area.

==== History ====
Ristikivi was originally the name of a farm in the area. It was first mentioned in 1816. Its name literally translates to "cross rock", referring to a rock marking the border between the villages of Jyväskylä and Keljo. The Ristikivi farm was located on the side of Keljo.

== Gallery ==
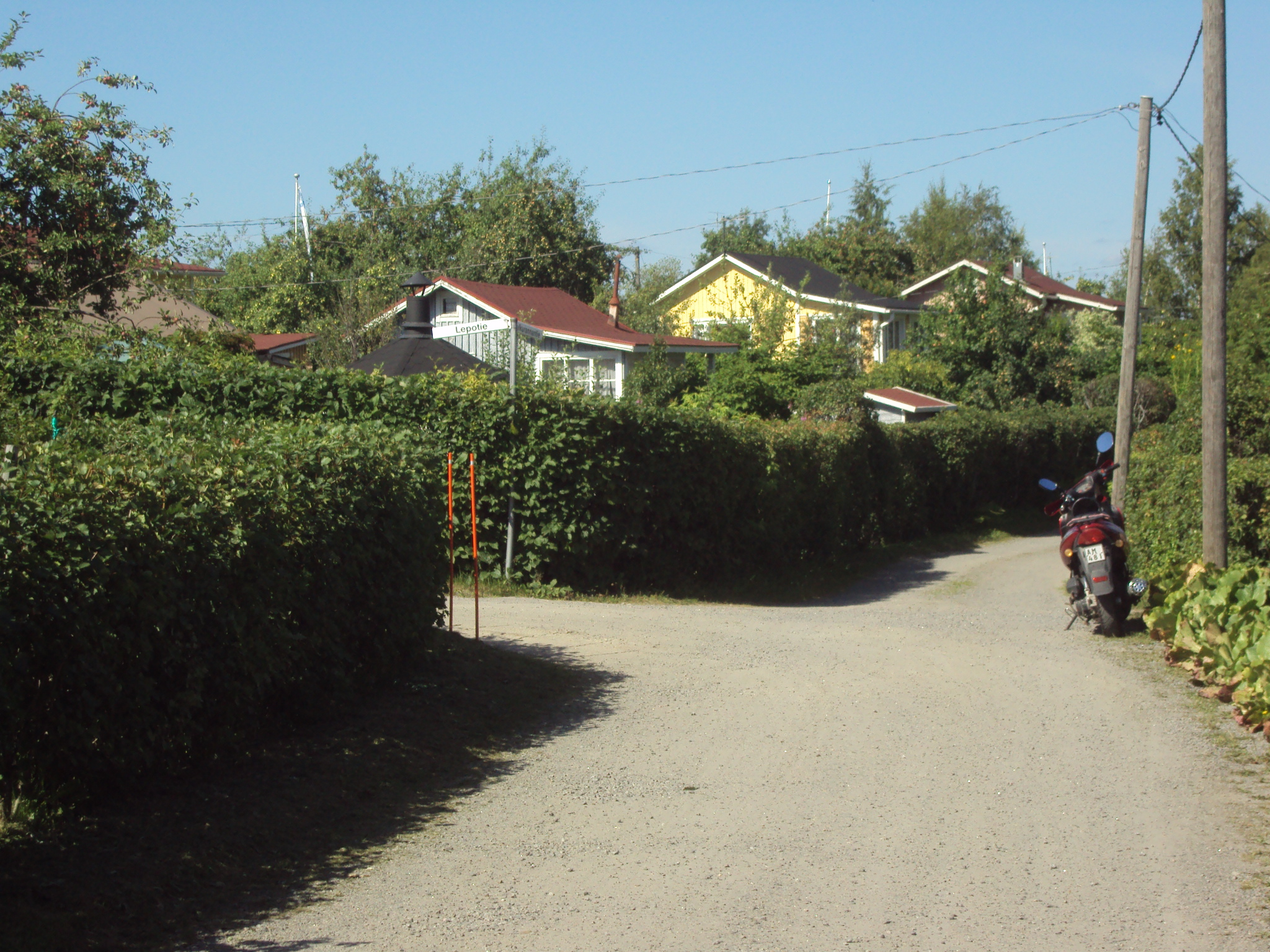
Silent footpaths of Sulkuranta allotment garden

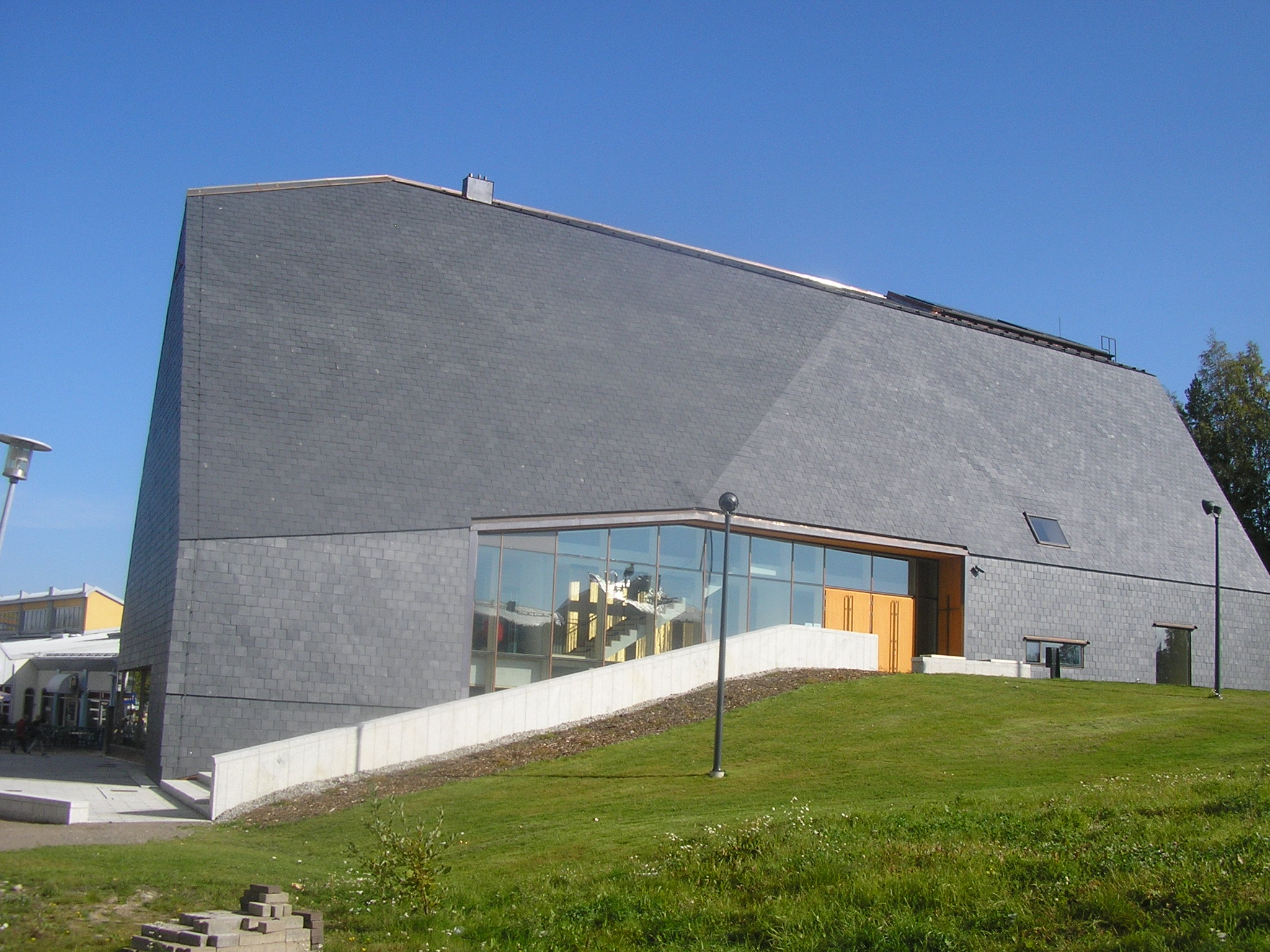
Kuokkala Church

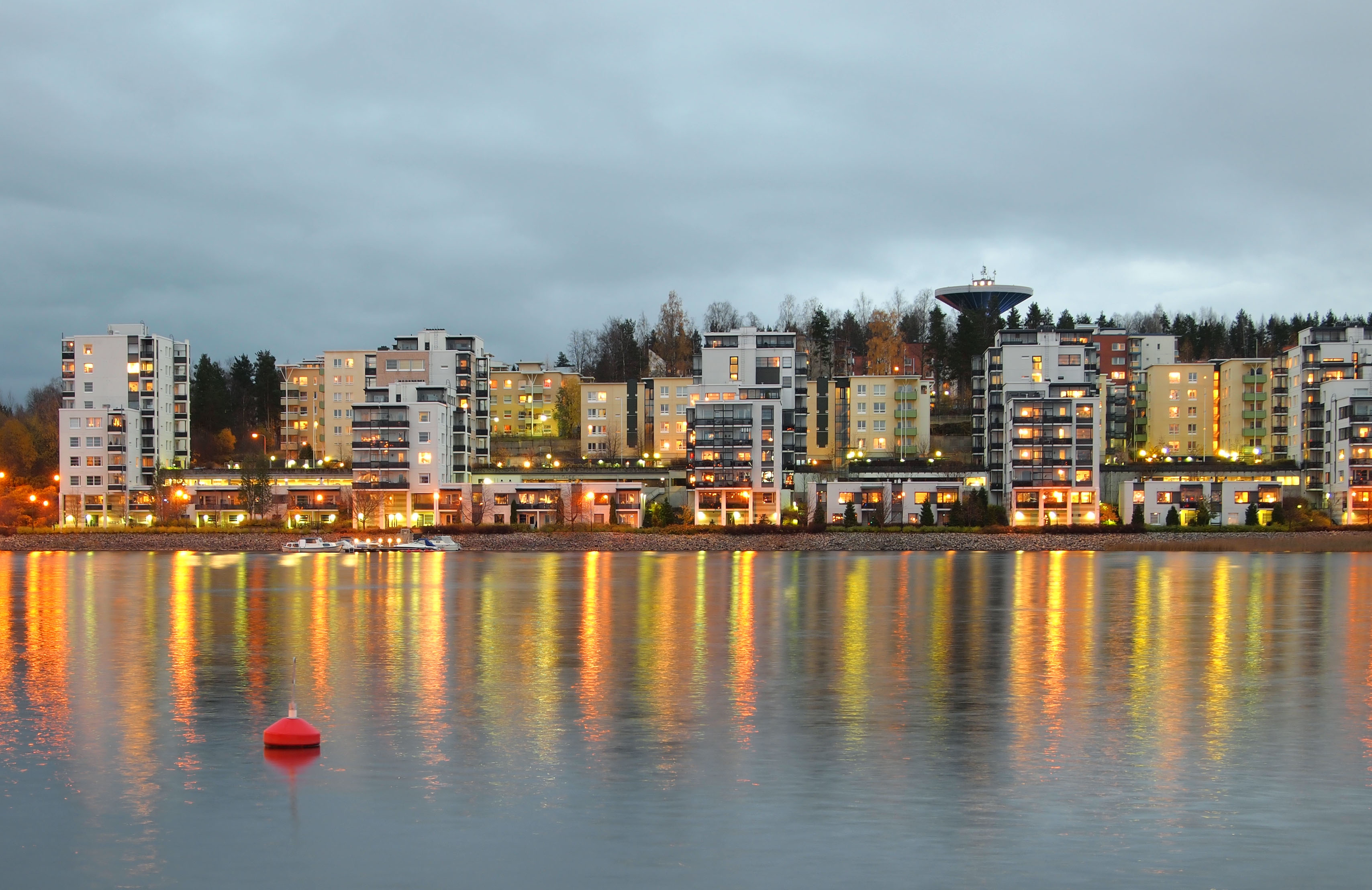
Houses in Ainolanranta

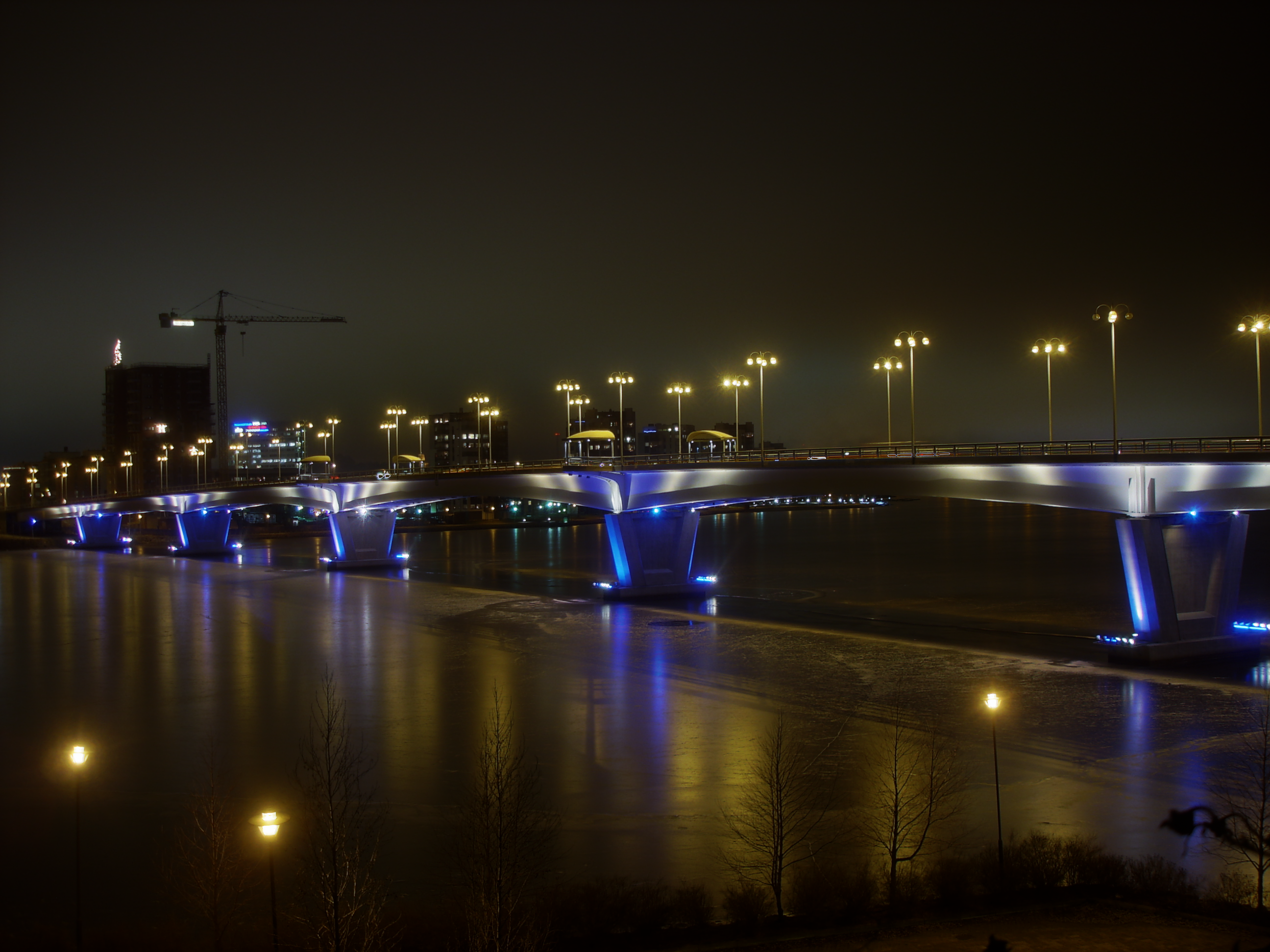
Kuokkala Bridge at night

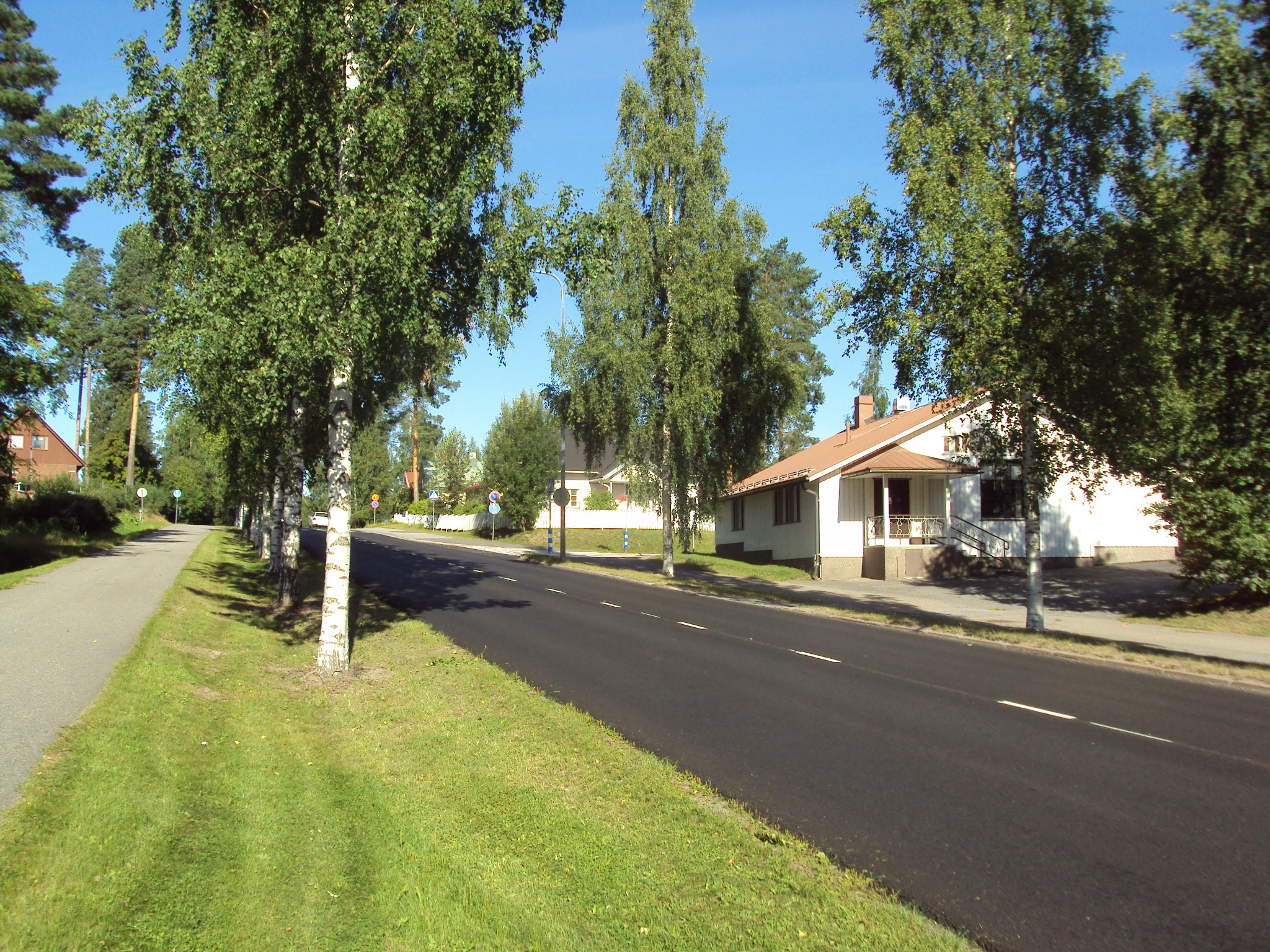
A peaceful road on outskirts of Kuokkala

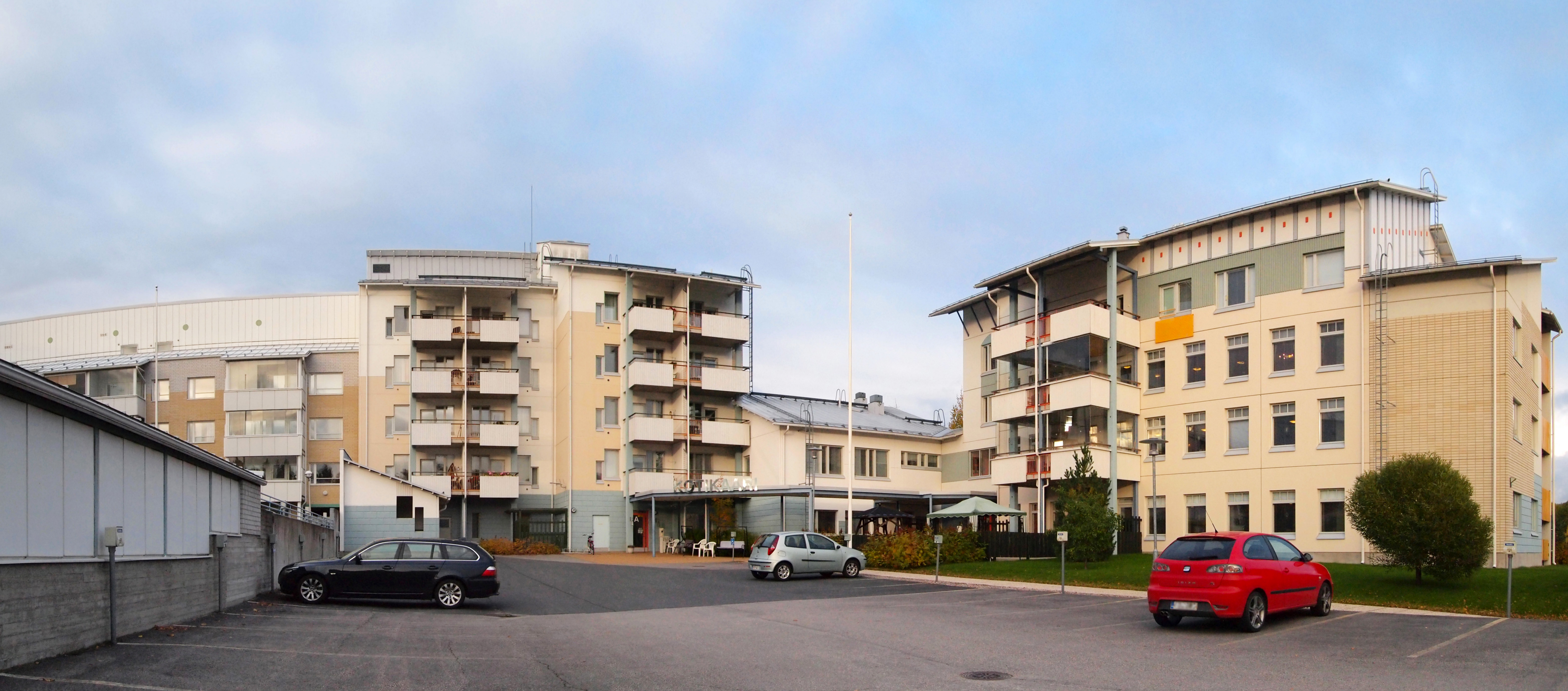
Apartment houses in Kuokkala

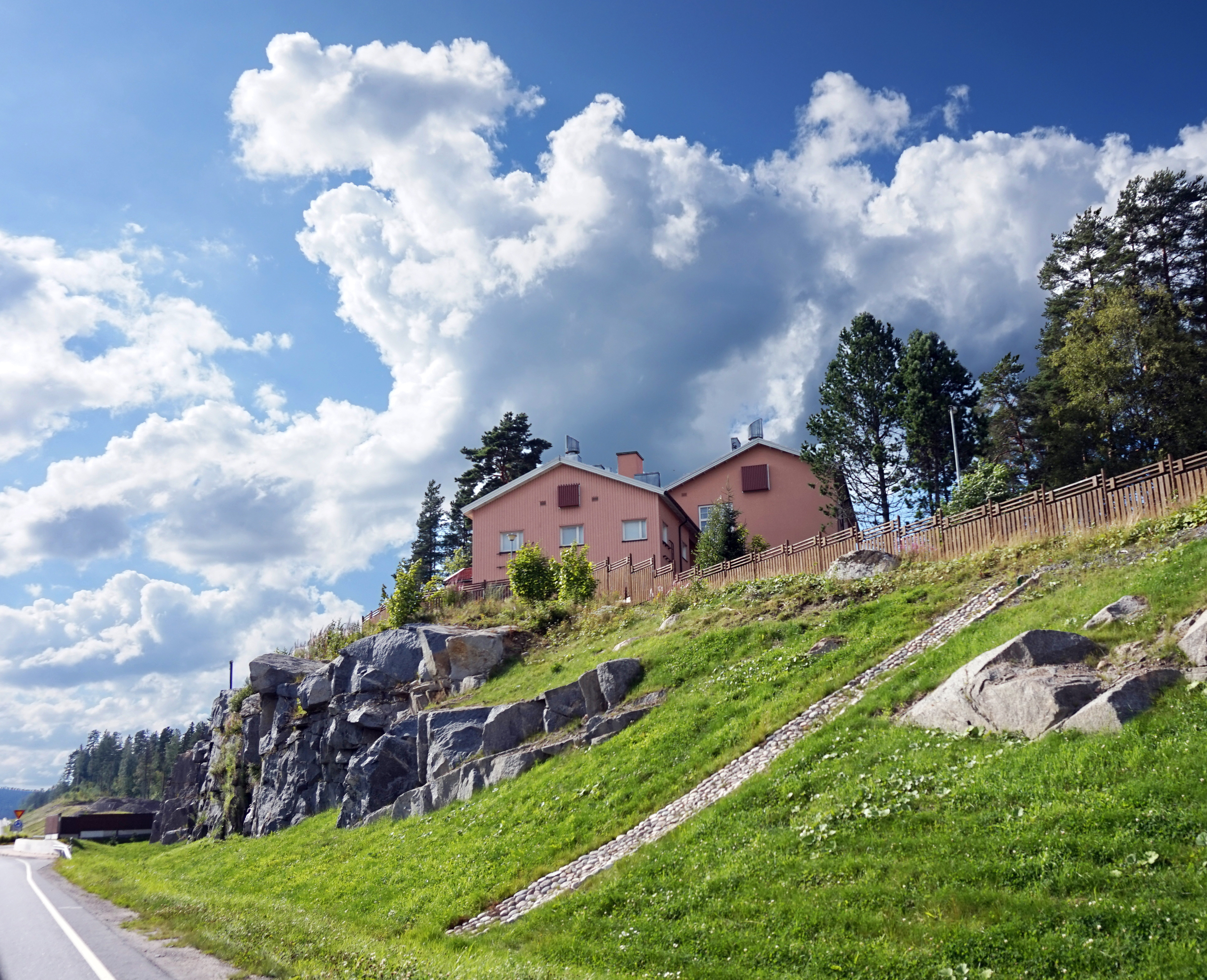
Tikka School

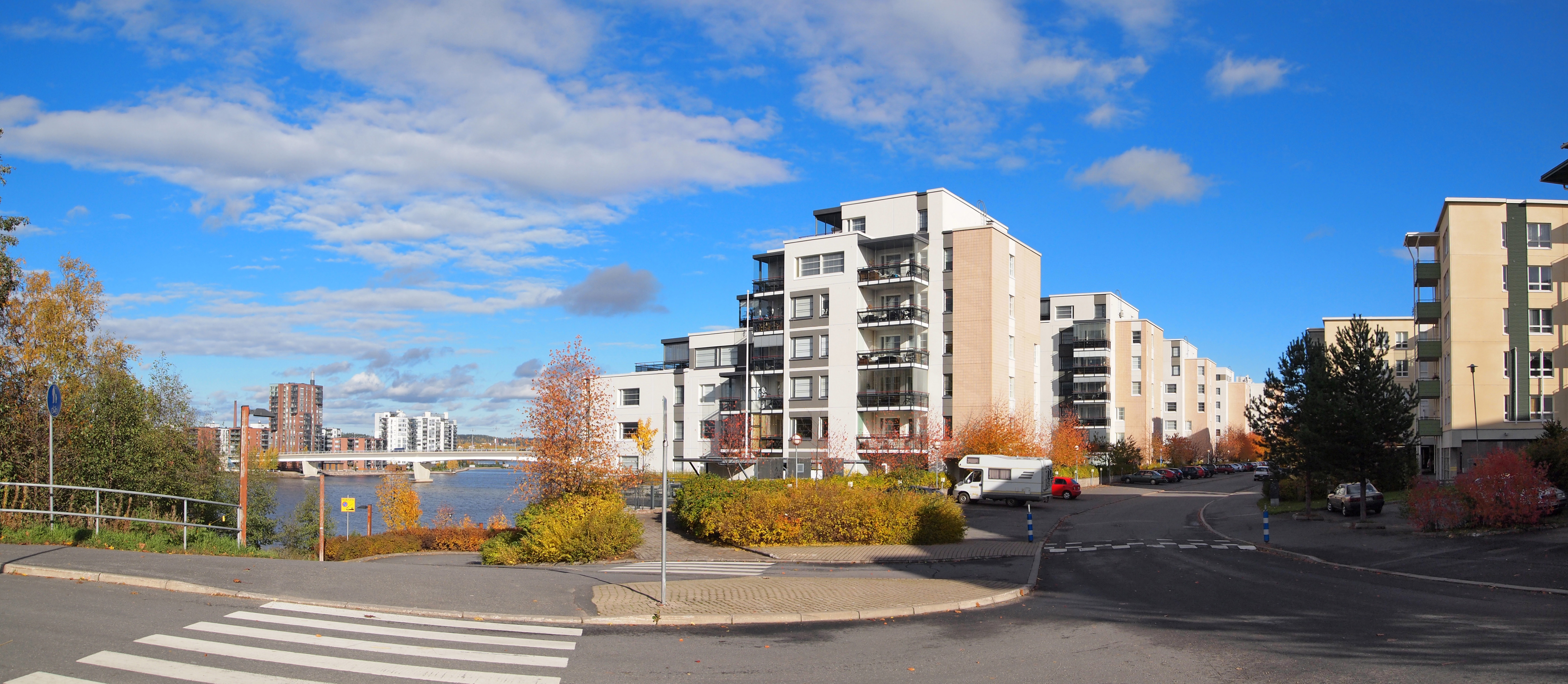
Ainolanranta

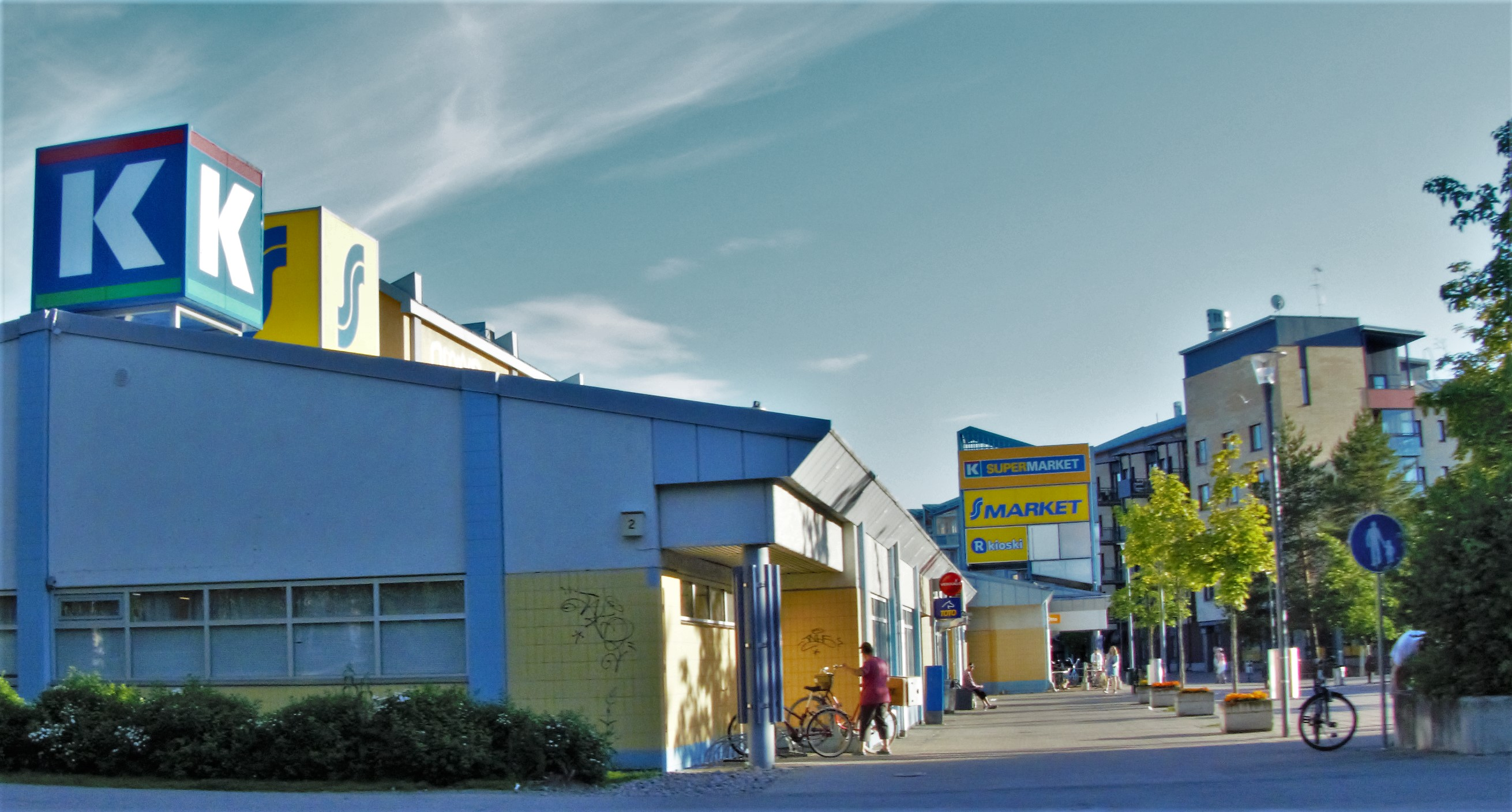
Kuokkala mall

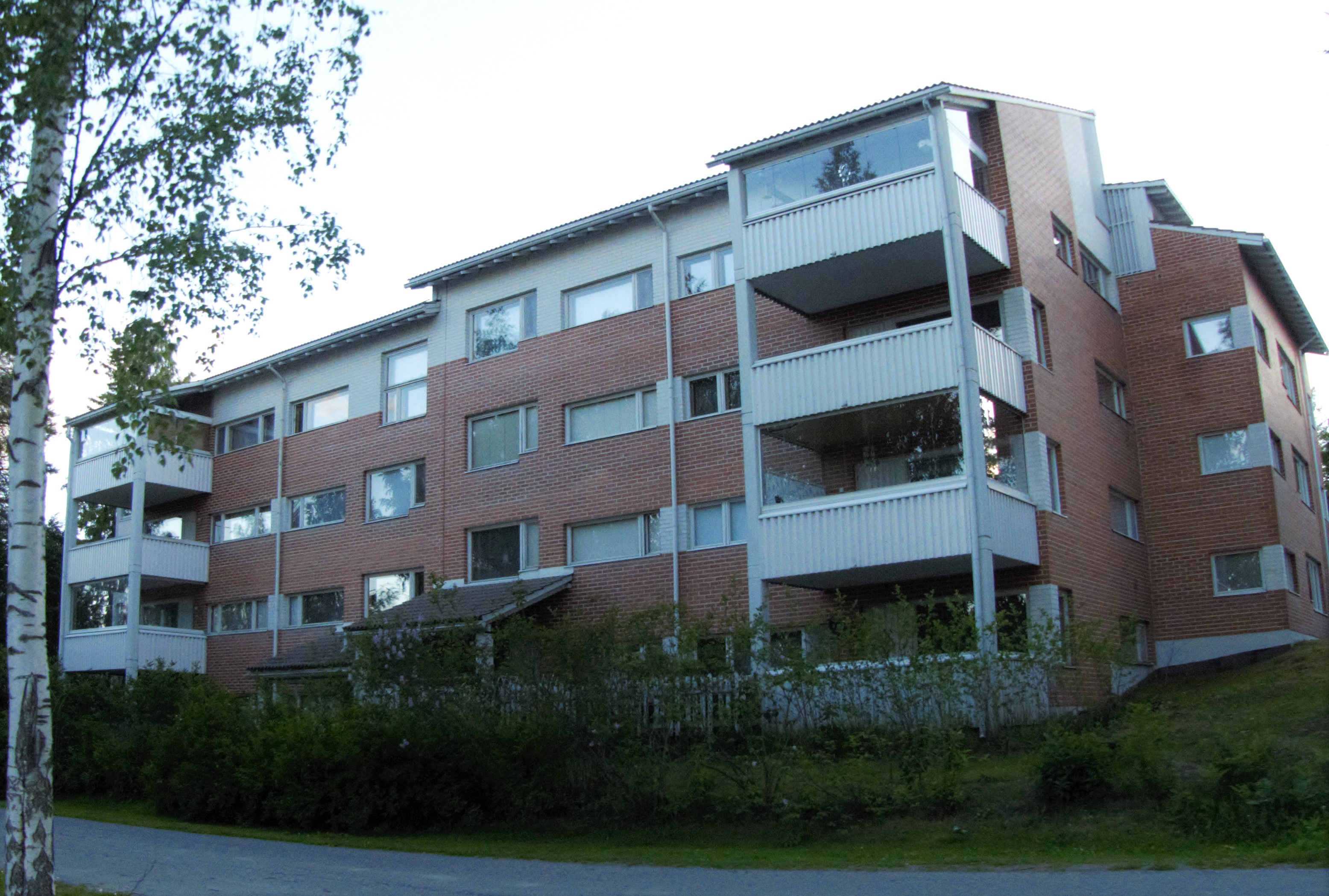
An apartment building in Kuokkala

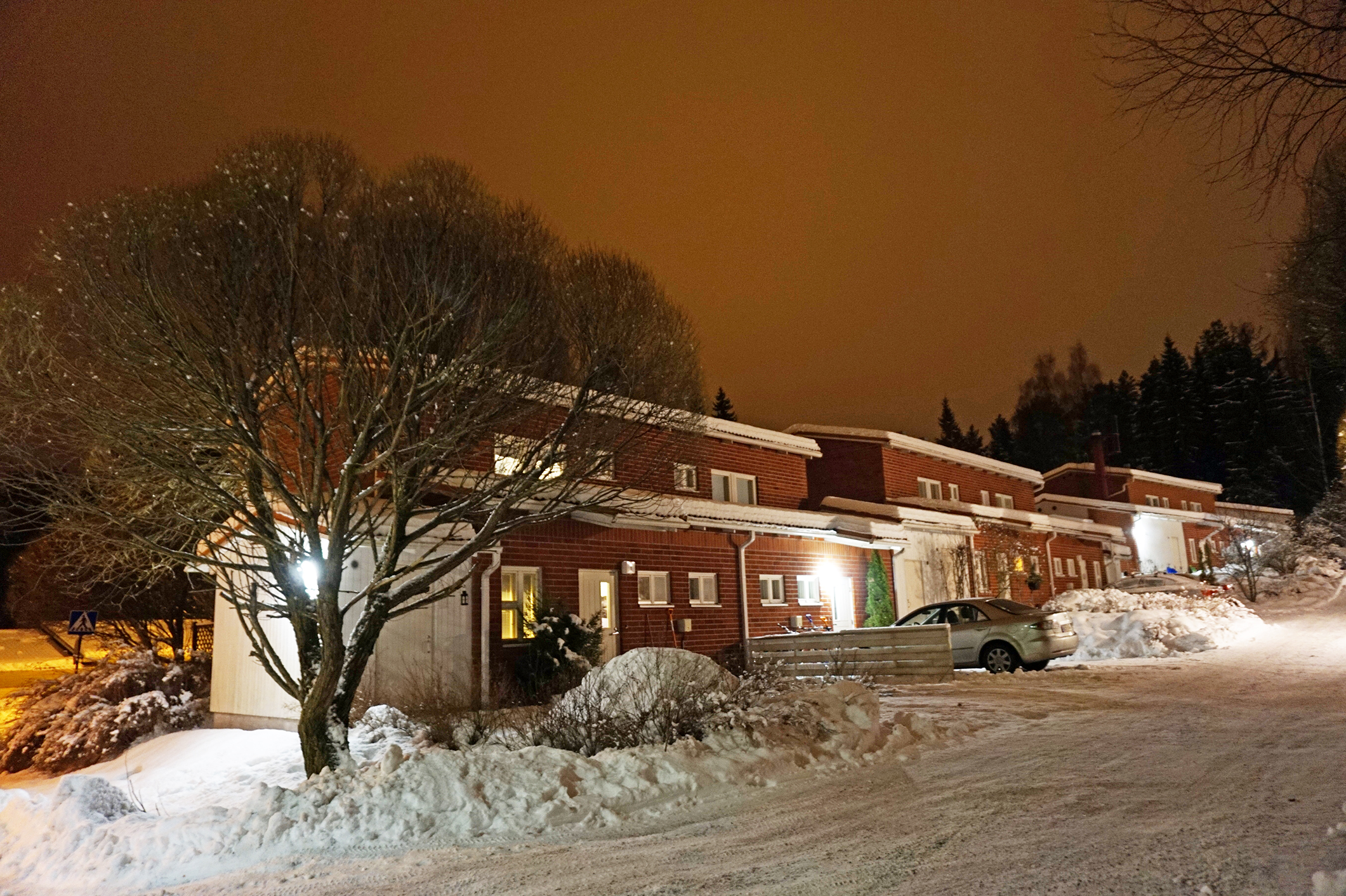
Ristikivi district

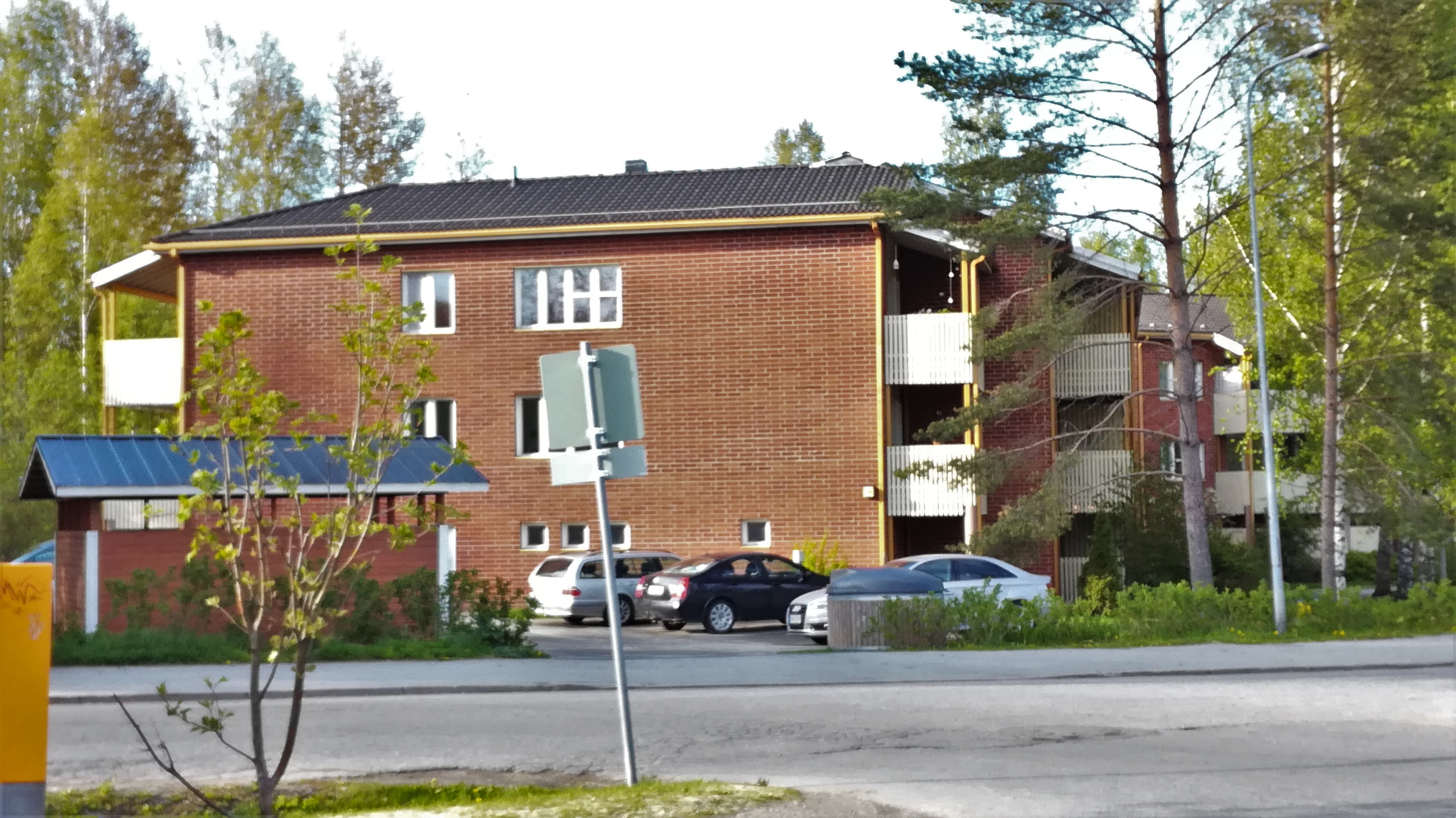
A house in the Kuokkalanpelto district
