= Vantaankoski Bridge =

Vantaankoski Bridge Vantaankosken silta
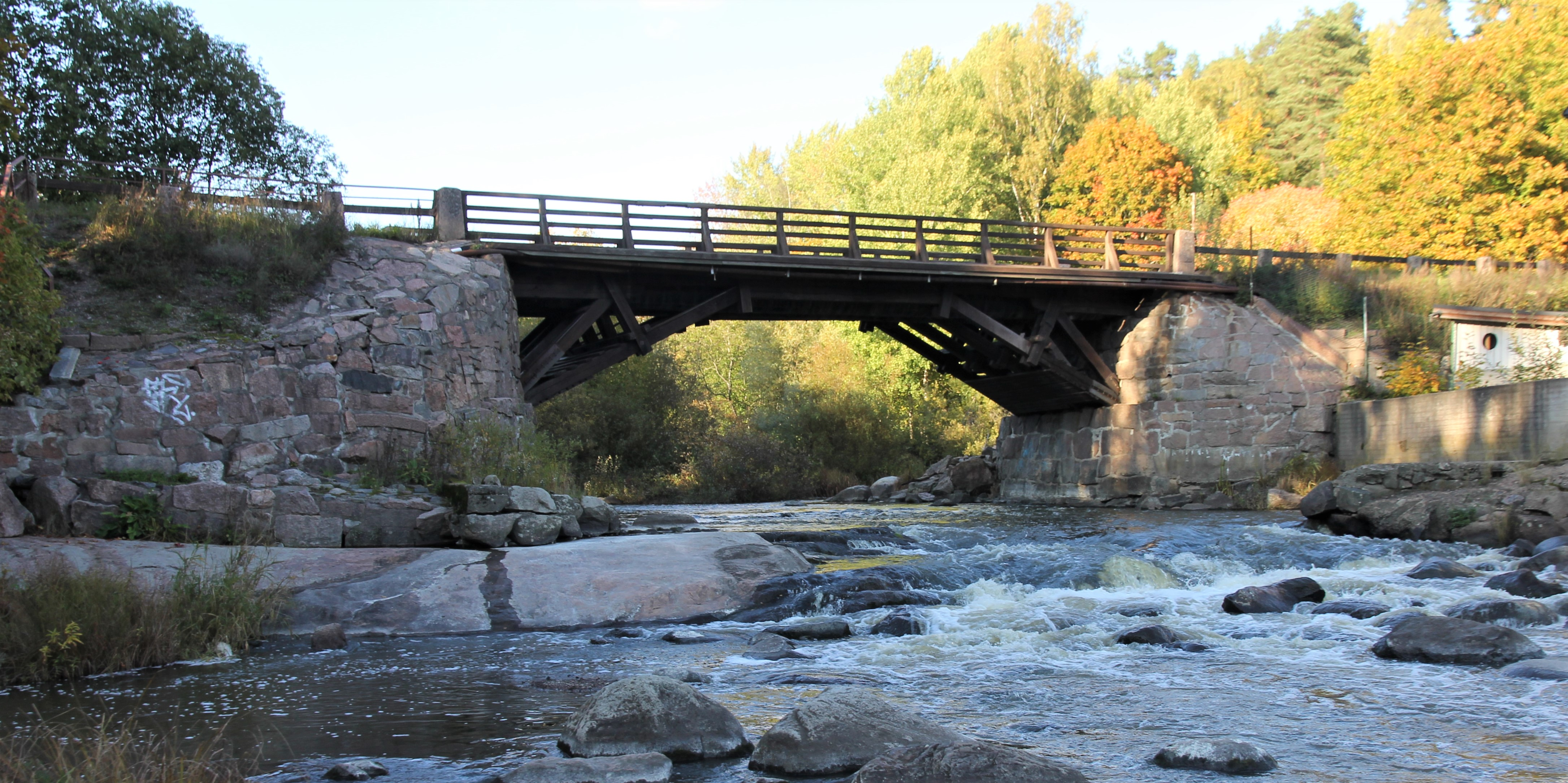
- Coordinates: 60°17′37.15″N 24°51′57.37″E
- Crosses: Vantaa River
- Locale: Vantaa, Uusimaa, Finland

Characteristics
- Material: Wood

History
- Opened: 1876

Location
- Interactive map of Vantaankoski Bridge

The Vantaankoski Bridge (Finnish: Vantaankosken silta) is a wood bridge crossing the Vantaankoski rapids between the Viinikkala and Vantaanlaakso districts of Vantaa. Completed in 1876, it was once part of the "Turku–Viipurin Suurta Rantatie" (the King's Road).

Next to the bridge, on the banks of the Vantaankoski rapids, is an old white file factory, the Dahlfors brick factory building, completed in 1903, which operated until the 1960s. In the early 2000s, the building, renovated by the City of Vantaa, was converted into a restaurant for on-demand use.
