= Lahnavesi =

Lake in South Savonia, Finland

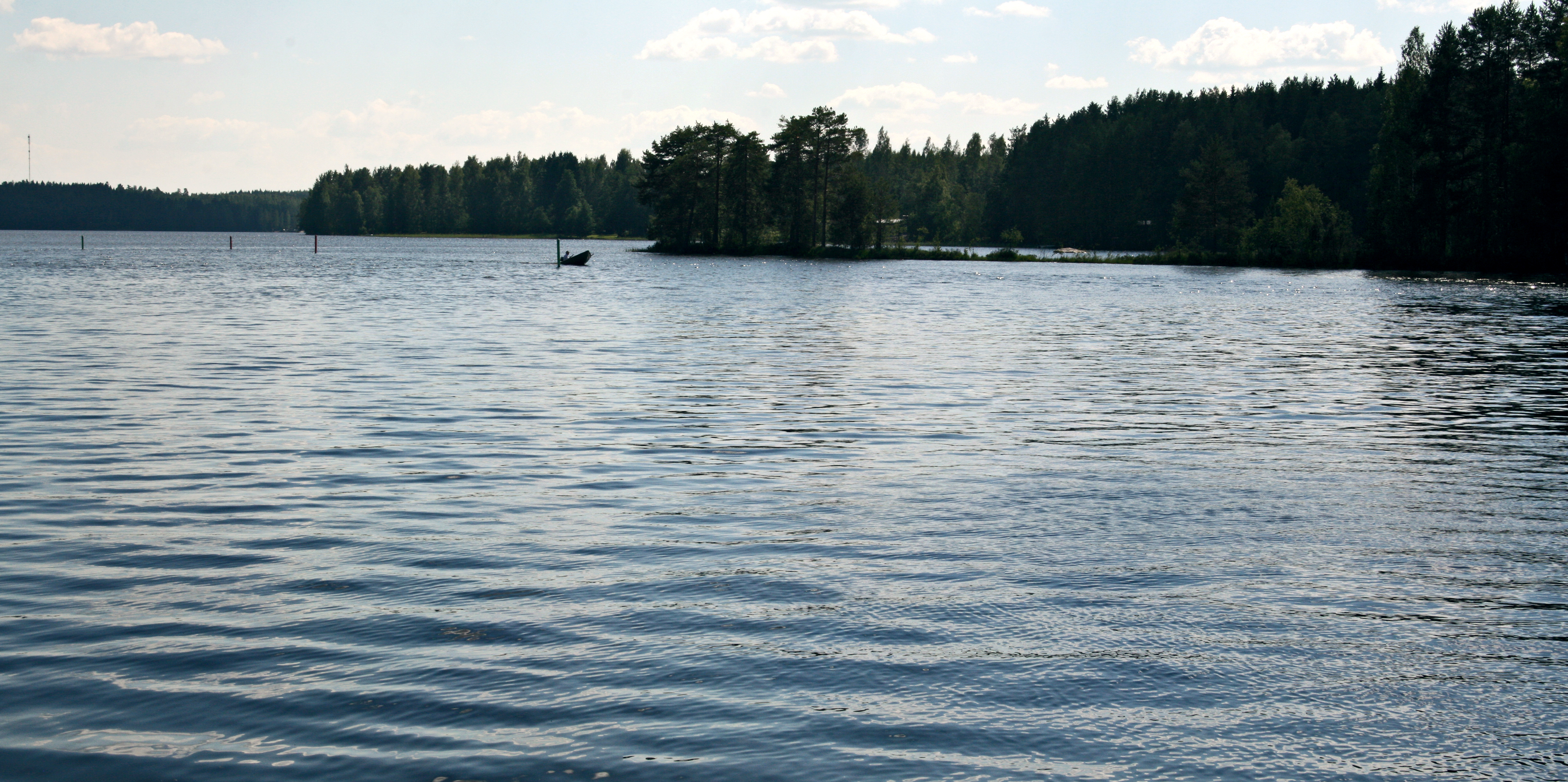
- Strait Vihantasalmi deal Lake Lahnavesi in two parts. Vihannanselkä is on the picture.

- Location within Finland
- Location: Mäntyharju
- Coordinates: 61°28.5′N 26°40.5′E
- Primary inflows: Kaivannonkoski rapids
- Primary outflows: Vihantasalmi strait
- Basin countries: Finland
- Surface area: 13.131 km^{2} (5.070 sq mi)
- Average depth: 7.14 m (23.4 ft)
- Max. depth: 33.03 m (108.4 ft)
- Water volume: 0.0938 km^{3} (76,000 acre⋅ft)
- Shore length^{1}: 53.74 km (33.39 mi)
- Surface elevation: 79.7 m (261 ft)
- Frozen: December–April
- Settlements: Pertunmaa
- ^{1} Shore length is not a well-defined measure.

Lahnavesi is a medium-sized lake in the Kymijoki main catchment area. It is located in Mäntyharju, in the Southern Savonia region in Finland.

== See also ==
- List of lakes in Finland
