= Beam bridge =

Type of bridge

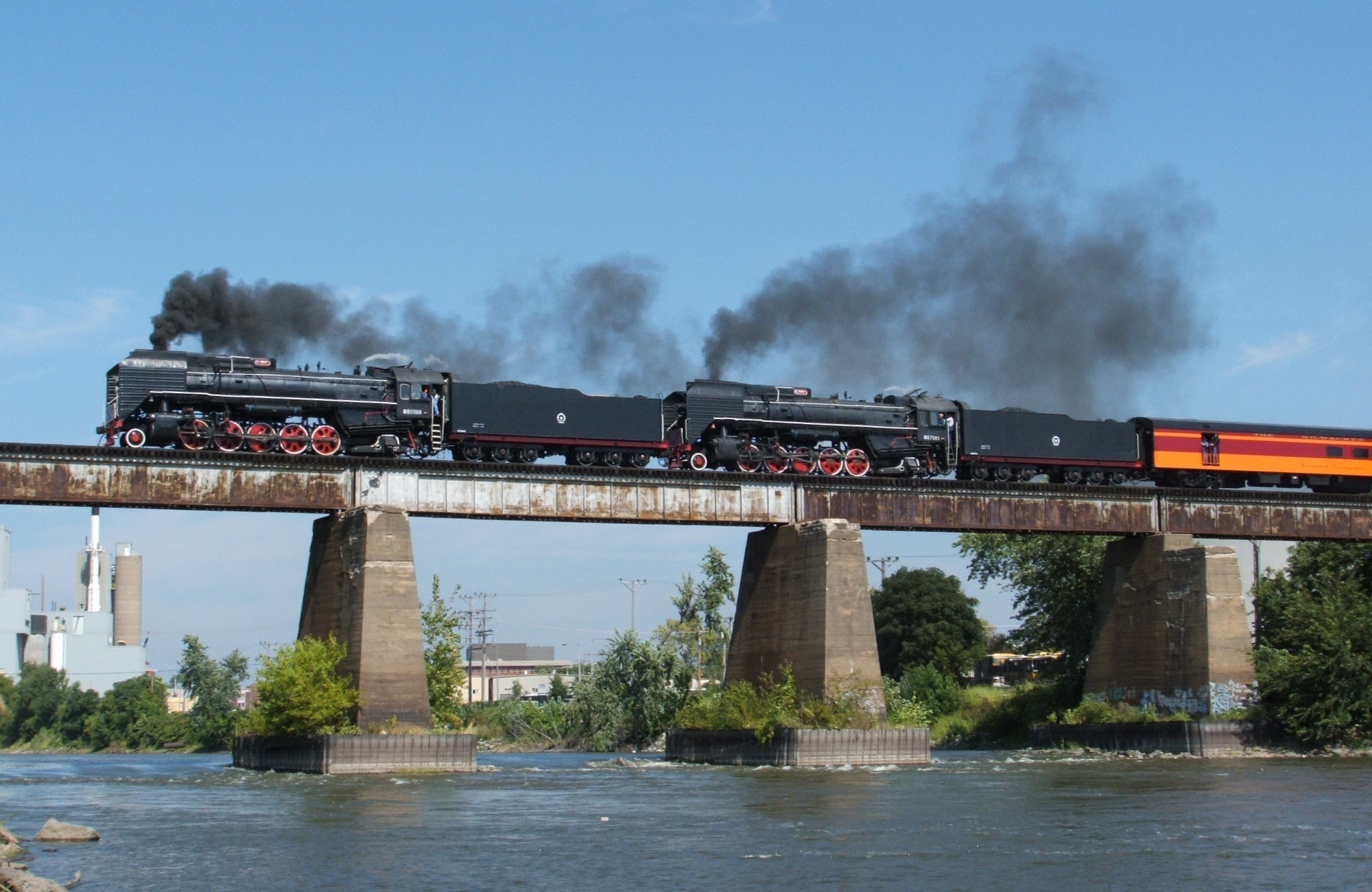
- Multispan plate girder bridge deck on concrete piers.
- Span range: Short
- Material: Timber, iron, steel, reinforced concrete, prestressed concrete
- Movable: No
- Design effort: Low
- Falsework required: No unless cast-in-place reinforced concrete is used

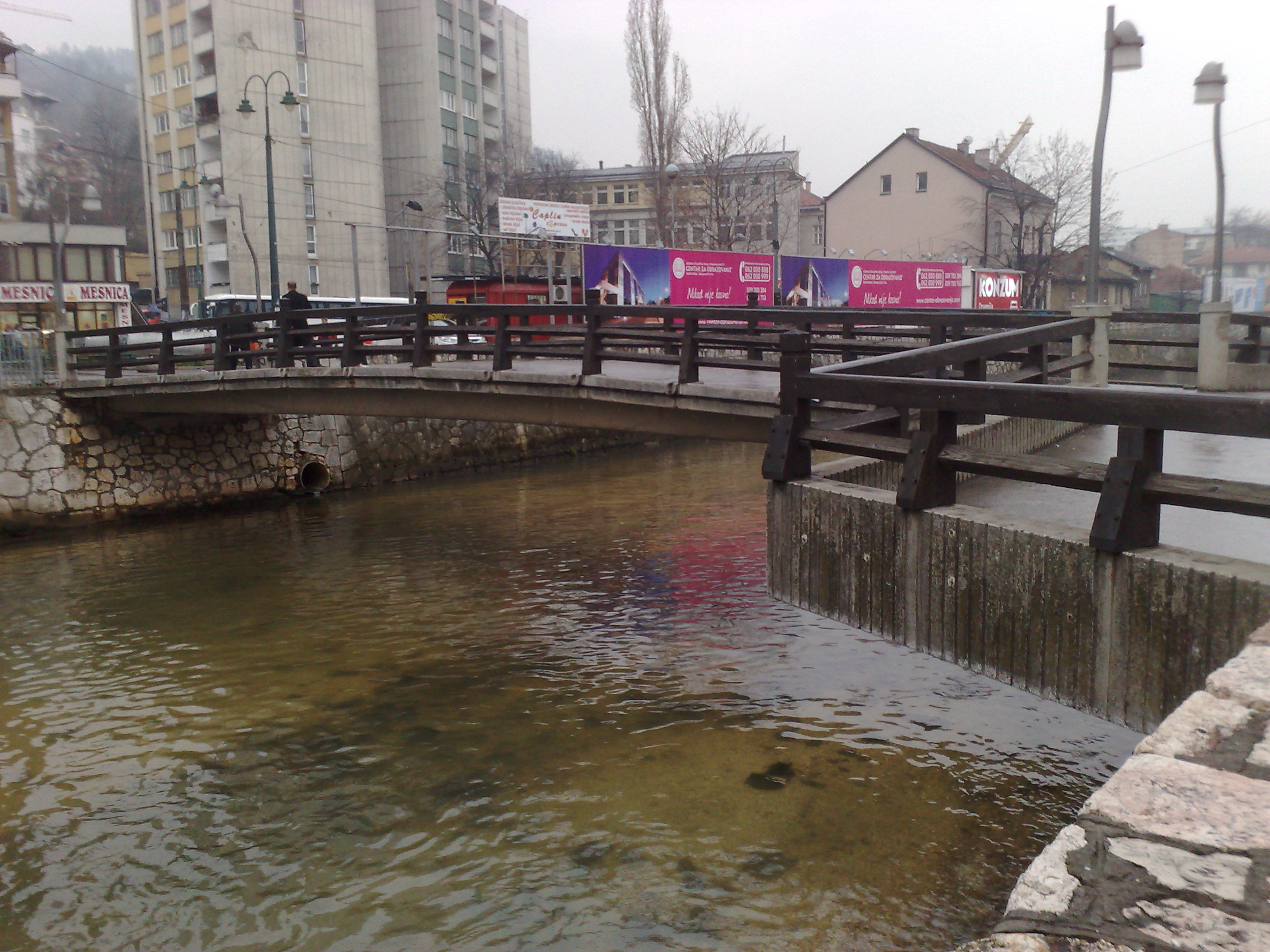
Drvenija bridge, Sarajevo

Beam bridges are the simplest structural forms for bridge spans supported by an abutment or pier at each end. No moments are transferred throughout the support, hence their structural type is known as simply supported.

The simplest beam bridge could be a log (see log bridge), a wood plank, or a stone slab (see clapper bridge) laid across a stream. Bridges designed for modern infrastructure will usually be constructed of steel or reinforced concrete, or a combination of both. The concrete elements may be reinforced or prestressed. Such modern bridges include girder, plate girder, and box girder bridges, all of which are types of beam bridges.

Types of construction could include having many beams side by side with a deck across the top of them, or a main beam on either side supporting a deck between them. The main beams could be I-beams, trusses, or box girders. They could be half-through, or braced across the top to create a through bridge.

Since no moments are transferred, thrust (as from an arch bridge) cannot be accommodated, leading to innovative designs, such as lenticular trusses and bow string arches, which contain the horizontal forces within the superstructure.

Beam bridges are not limited to a single span. Some viaducts, such as the Feiyunjiang Bridge in China, have multiple supported spans held up by piers. This is in contrast to viaducts that use continuous spans over the piers.

Beam bridges are often only used for relatively short distances because, unlike truss bridges, they have no built-in supports. Piers provide the only support. The further apart its supports, the weaker a beam bridge gets. As a result, beam bridges rarely span more than 250 feet (80 m). This does not mean that beam bridges are not used to span great distances. It only means that a series of beam bridges must be joined, creating what is known as a continuous span.

== History ==
The beam bridges are among the earliest forms of bridges constructed by humans, originating as imitations of natural formations. Prehistoric people observed fallen trees spanning streams and replicated this approach in locations where it was practical.

== See also ==
- Arch bridge
- Suspension bridge
- Truss bridge
