= Laukonsilta =

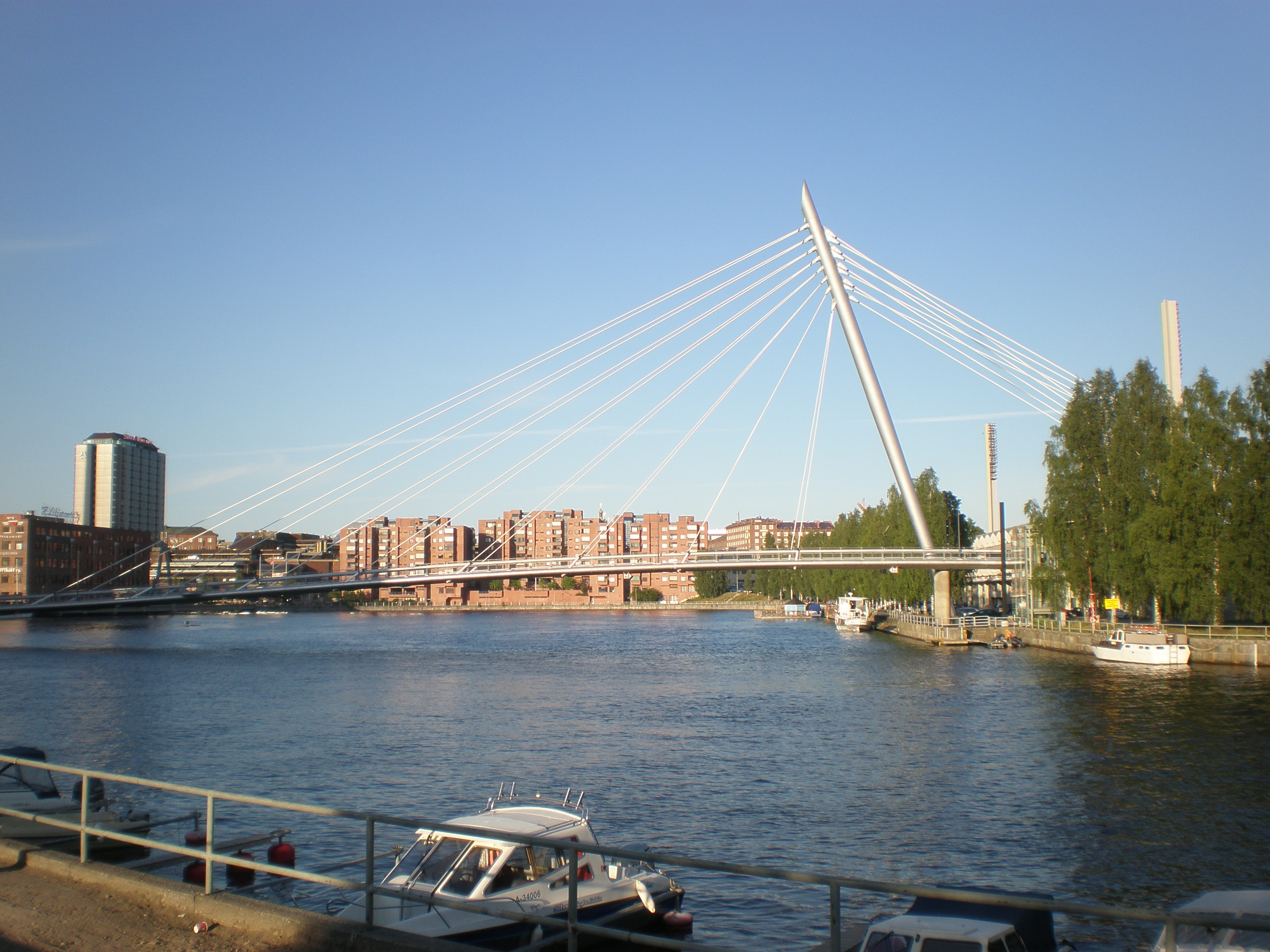
- Coordinates: 61°29′37.4″N 23°45′37.3″E
- Carries: Pedestrians and bicycles
- Crosses: Tammerkoski
- Locale: Tampere, Finland

Characteristics
- Design: Cable-stayed bridge
- Material: Prestressed concrete
- Total length: 150 m
- Width: 5 m

History
- Opened: 30 June 2010

Location
- Interactive map of Laukonsilta

Laukonsilta is a pedestrian and cycling bridge in Tampere, Finland. It crosses the Tammerkoski rapids between the Ratina district and Laukontori square. The bridge was officially opened on 30 June 2010 by the Mayor of Tampere, Timo P. Nieminen.

The bridge is a concrete, cable-stayed bridge. The bridge deck is a horizontal arch and is tilted both transversely and longitudinally. The deck is supported by steel cables supported by a single inclined steel pylon. The height of the top of the pylon is approximately 46.5 meters above the water level and approximately 38.5 meters above the bridge deck. The bridge has a usable width of 5 meters and has a total length of 150 meters.

The bridge was built according to a design titled Kellopeli, submitted by WSP Finland Oy, which won an architectural and engineering design competition held in 2007. Construction began in January 2009, with a contract value of approximately €4.9 million. The main contractor was Insinööritoimisto Seppo Rantala Oy. The bridge's lead designer was civil engineer Pekka Pulkkinen.

The Finnish Association of Civil Engineers (RIL) chose Laukonsilta as the Bridge of the Year 2011.
