= Myllysilta =

Bridge in Turku, Finland

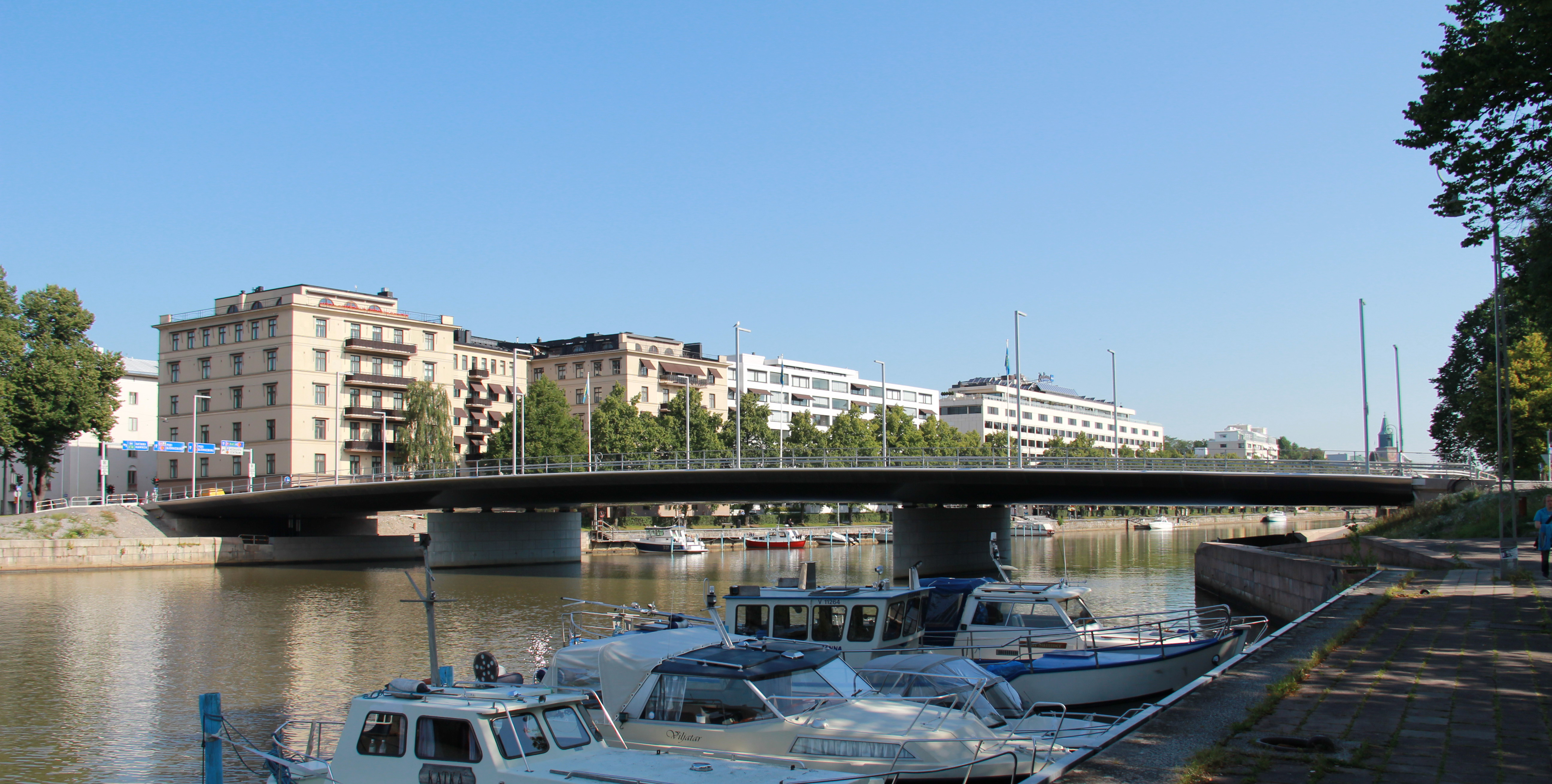
- Myllysilta in August 2012.
- Coordinates: 60°26′42.8″N 022°15′28.3″E
- Carries: 4 lanes of roadway 1 sidewalk
- Crosses: Aurajoki
- Locale: Turku
- Official name: Myllysilta

Characteristics
- Design: Steel girder bridge
- Total length: 93 m (305 ft)
- Width: 20.5 m (67 ft)
- Clearance below: 3.6 m (12 ft)

History
- Opened: 19 September 2011

Location
- Interactive map of Myllysilta

Myllysilta 1975–2010
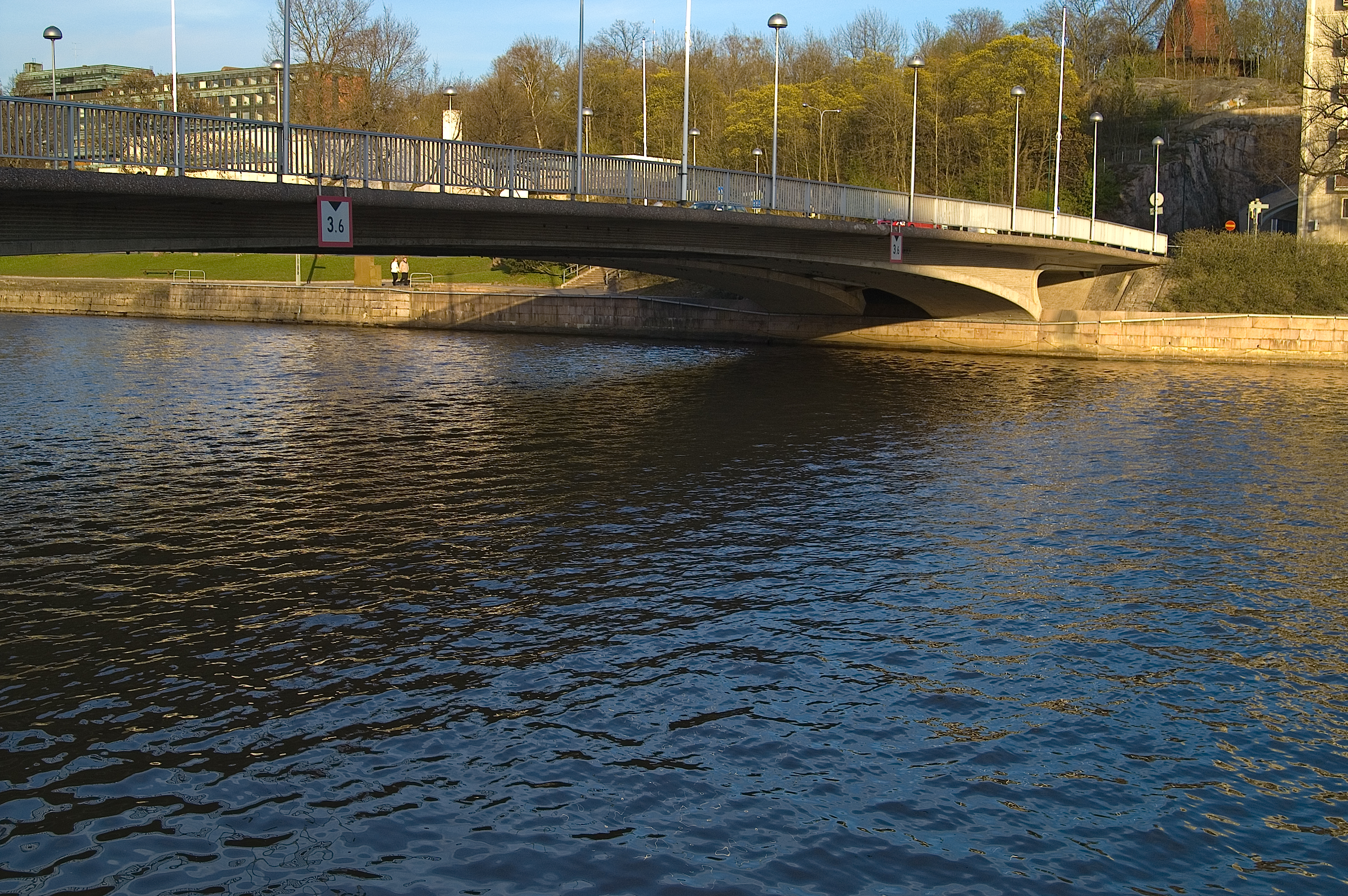
- Myllysilta in 2007.
- Coordinates: 60°26′42.8″N 022°15′28.3″E
- Carries: 3 lanes of roadway 2 sidewalks
- Crosses: Aurajoki
- Locale: Turku
- Official name: Myllysilta

Characteristics
- Design: prestressed concrete box girder bridge
- Total length: 92.7 m (304 ft)
- Width: 20 m (66 ft)
- Clearance below: 3.6 m (12 ft)

History
- Opened: 1975
- Closed: March 6, 2010

Location
- Interactive map of Myllysilta 1975–2010

The Myllysilta (Mill Bridge) (Swedish: Kvarnbron) is a steel girder bridge crossing the Aurajoki (Aura River) in the middle of the city of Turku in Finland. The bridge was opened on 19 September 2011. Only two of four lanes were first in use, the bridge was totally completed on 29 November 2011, even though some landscaping and stone work were completed in 2012. The bridge connects Turku's IV district to the VII district, and has four westbound lanes, and a sidewalk on northern side. It is a one-way-route from east to west, while the nearby Martinsilta bridge goes west to east.

== The bridge from 1975 to 2010 ==
The former bridge, a prestressed concrete box girder bridge, was built in 1975 and was 92.7 metres (304 ft) long and 20 metres (66 ft) wide, with three lanes (one-way westbound), and a sidewalk on both sides. Myllysilta was demolished in 2010 after a structural failure.

=== Failure ===
On 6 March 2010 the bridge was closed due to structural failures of both piers. The City of Turku originally reported that the bridge would remain closed for up to a year for repairs. It was later decided to demolish it and build a new bridge. In the meantime, Martinsilta functioned as a two-way bridge with two lanes designated for regular travel and one for Myllysilta's diverted traffic.

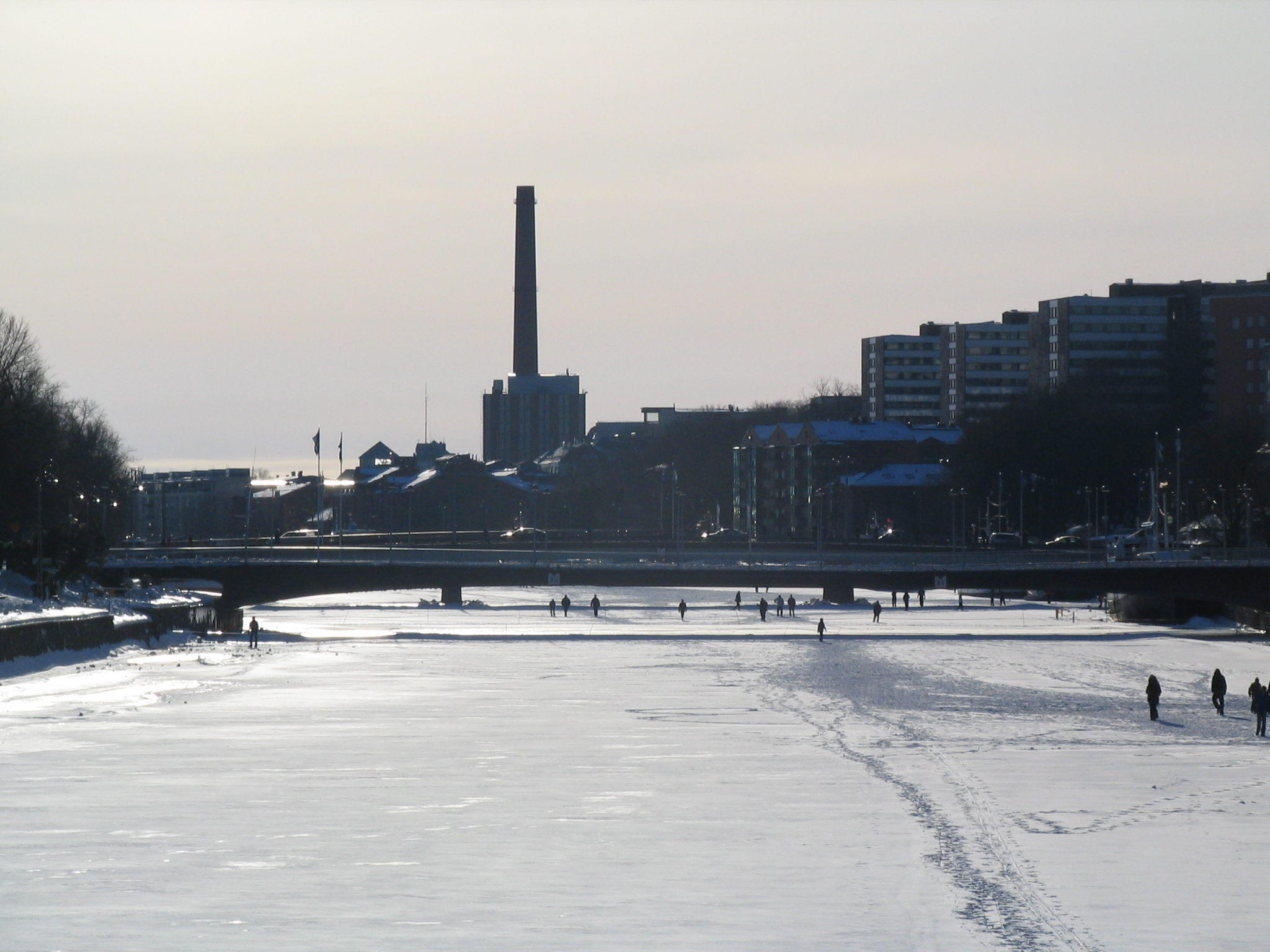
Sideview of Myllysilta.

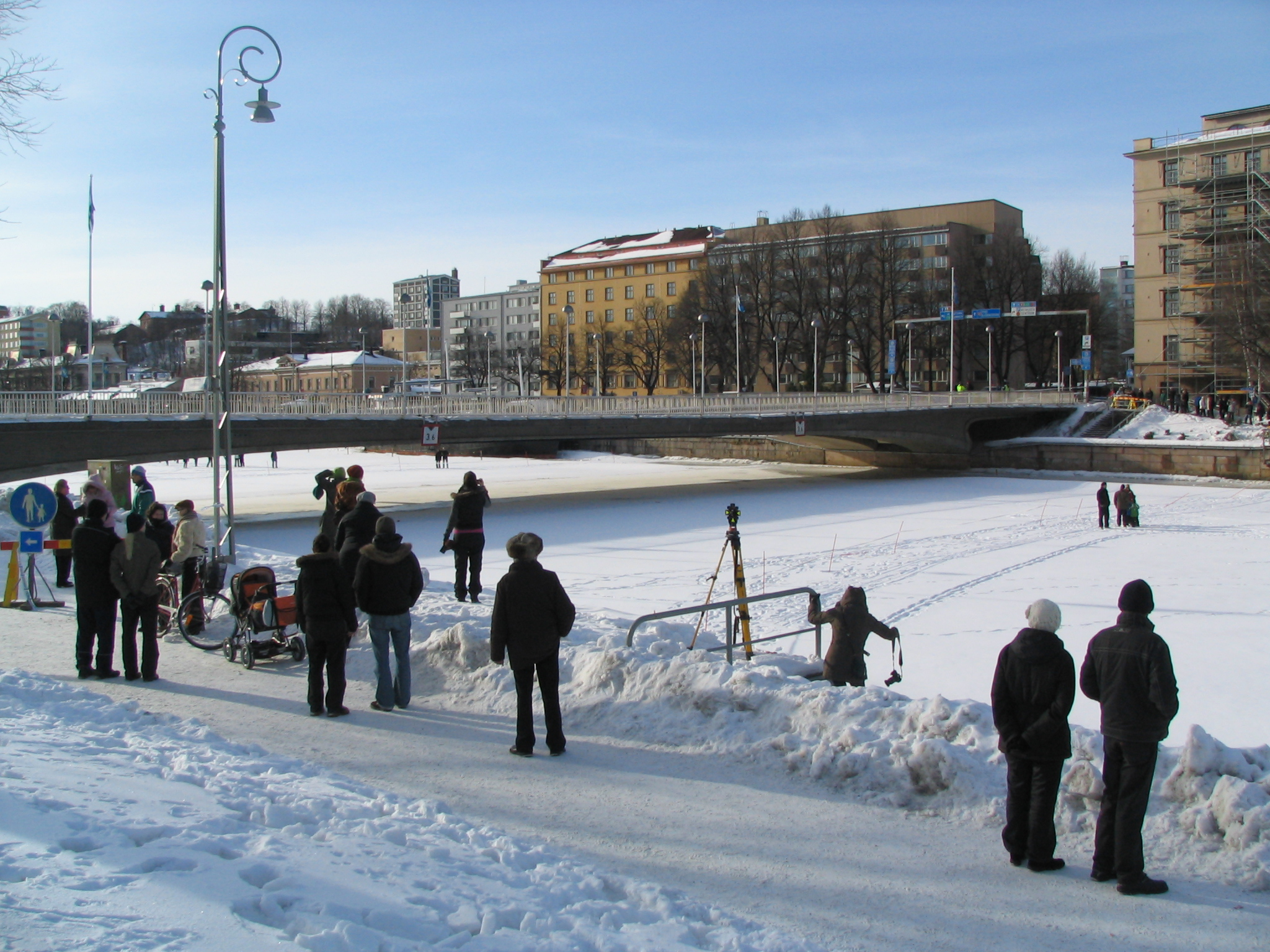
People watching the closed Myllysilta.

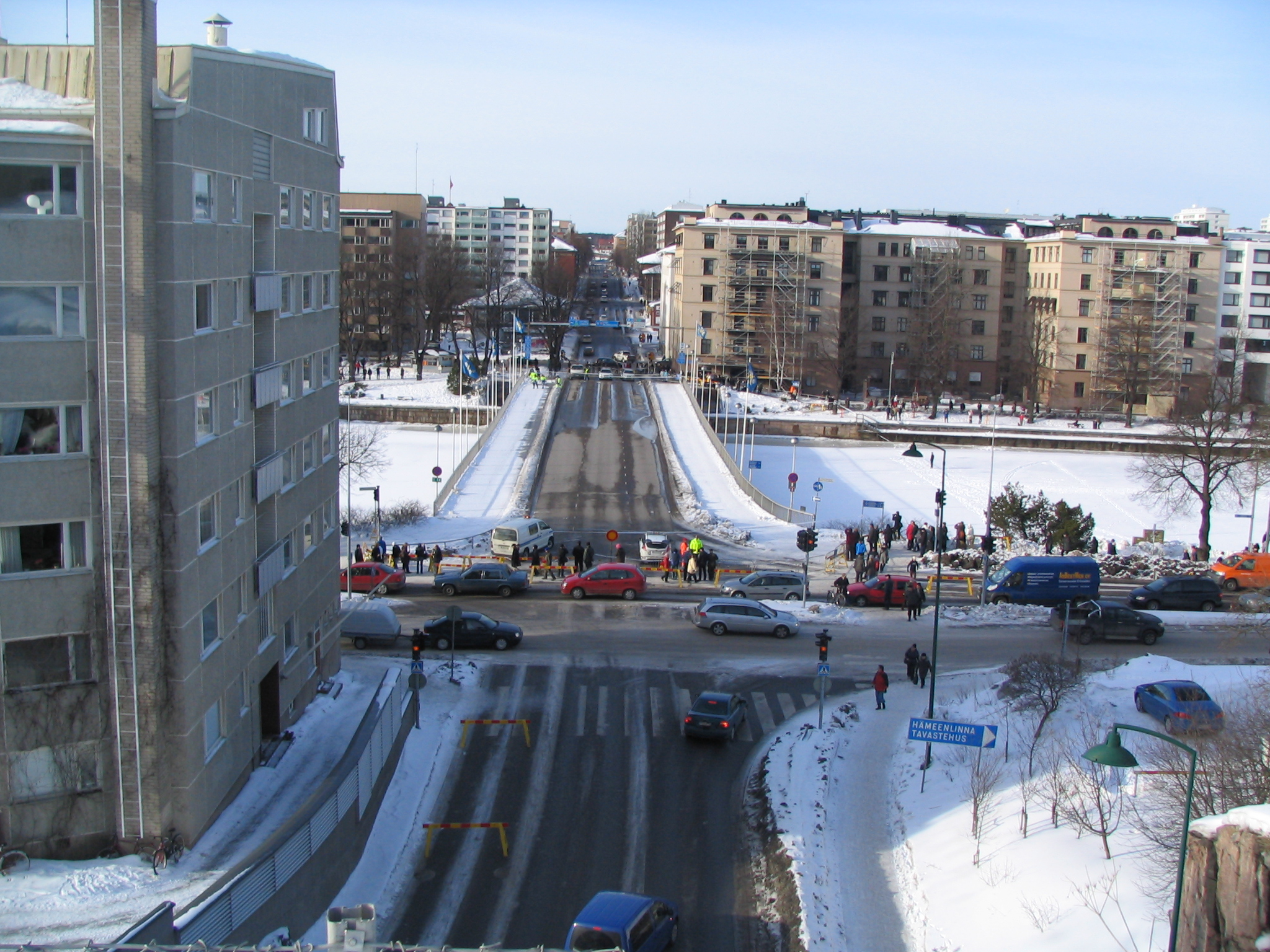
Closed Myllysilta seen from top of the Myllytunneli.

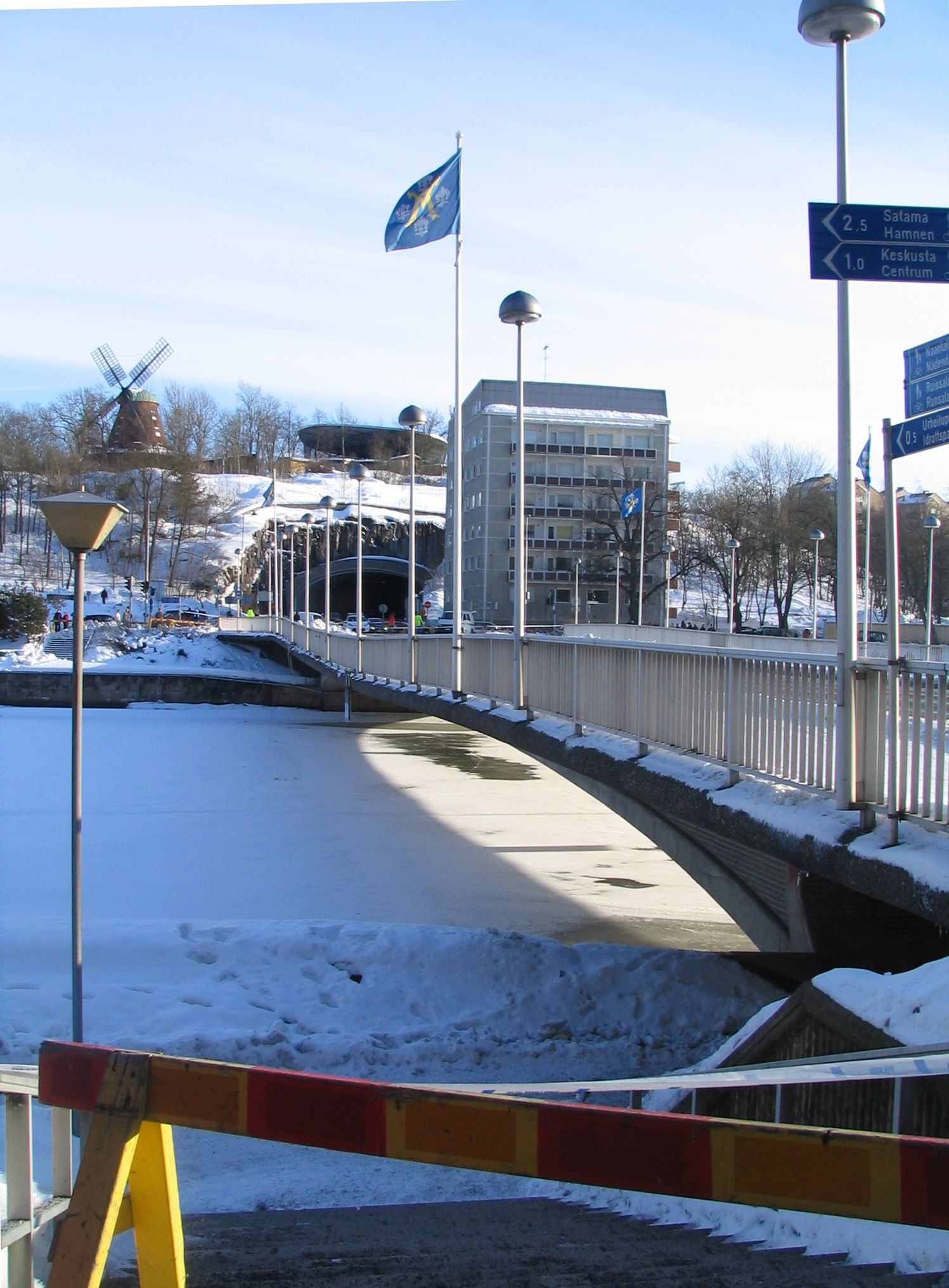
Picture which shows some of the structural failure.

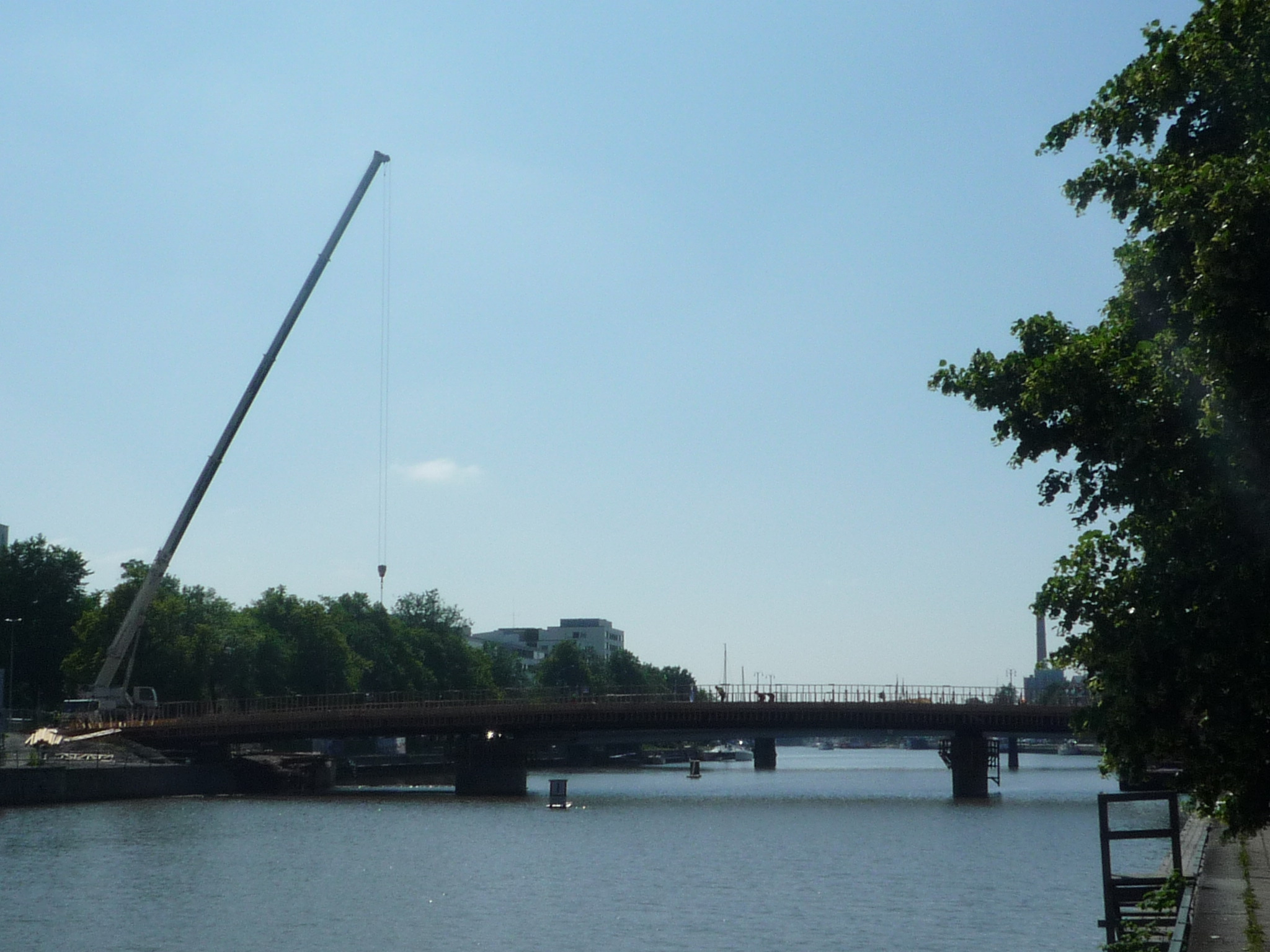
The replacement under construction in 2011 July
