= Wildlife of Finland =

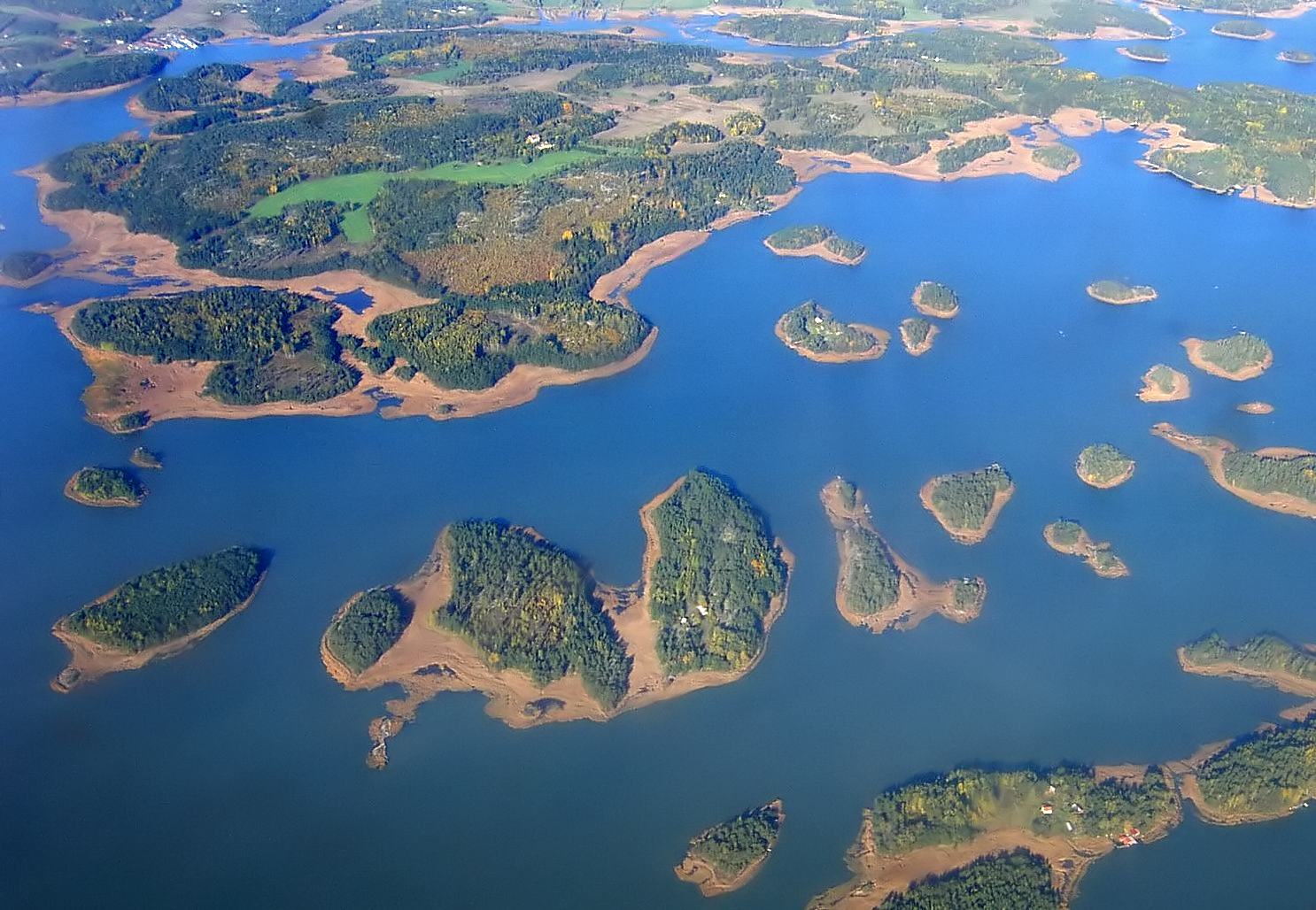
Islands in Naantali, coast of Baltic sea

The wildlife of Finland is affected by prevailing environmental conditions. The phytogeography of Finland is shared between the Arctic, central European, and northern European provinces of the Circumboreal Region within the Boreal Kingdom. The territory of Finland can be subdivided into three ecoregions: the Scandinavian and Russian taiga, Sarmatic mixed forests, and Scandinavian montane birch forest and grasslands. Taiga covers most of Finland from northern regions of southern provinces to the north of Lapland. On the southwestern coast, south of the Helsinki-Rauma line, forests are mixed as is more typical in the Baltic region. In the extreme north of Finland, near the tree line and Arctic Ocean, montane birch forests are common.

== Habitat types ==
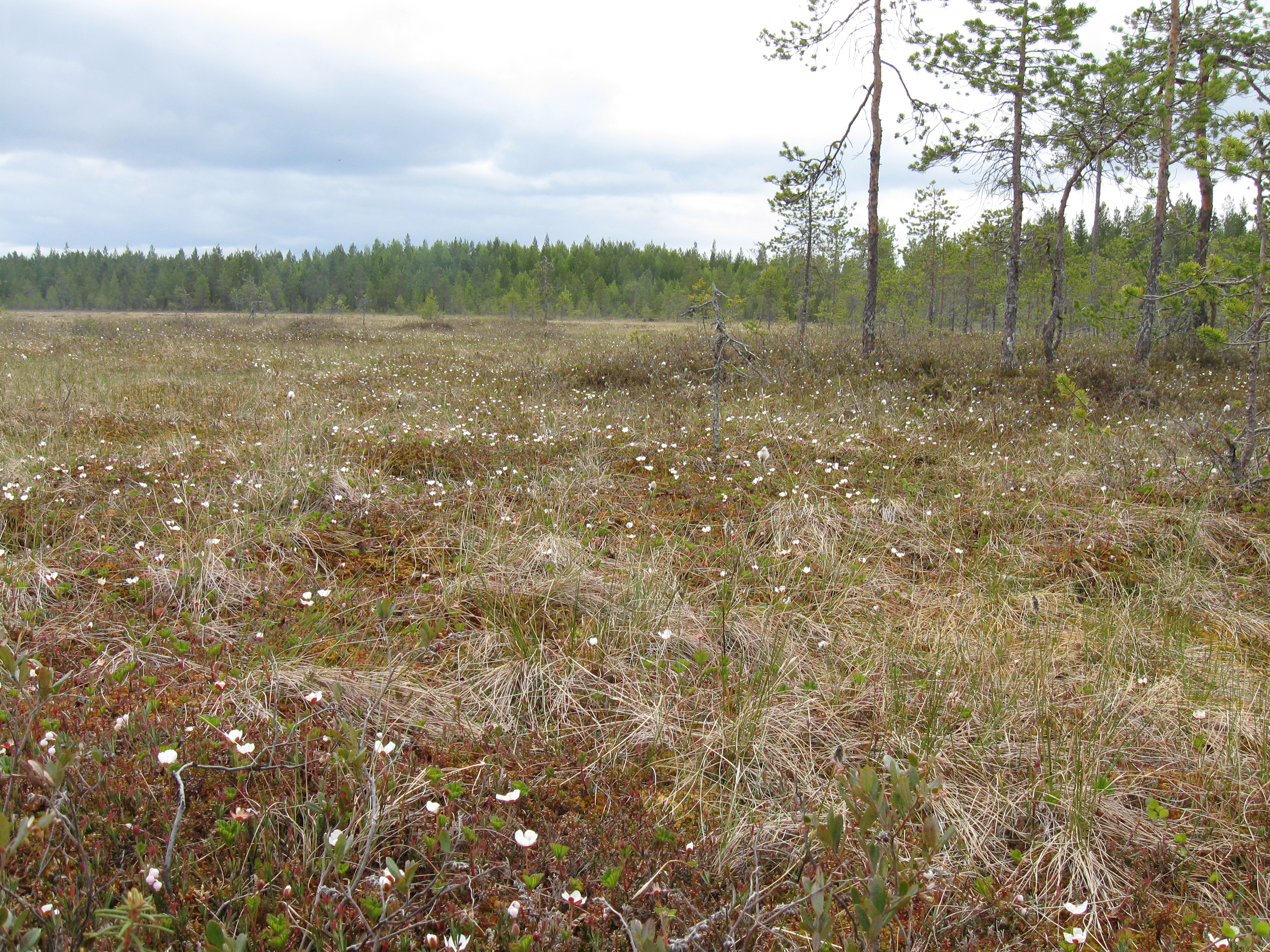
Cloudberry flowers at mire in Utajärvi.

The habitat types of Finland have been divided into eight groups by prevailing environmental conditions, and by the plant and animal species typical of such areas. The groups consist of habitat types of the Baltic Sea, its coast, inland waters and shores, mires, forests, rocky habitats, traditional rural biotopes and fell habitats.

== Species ==
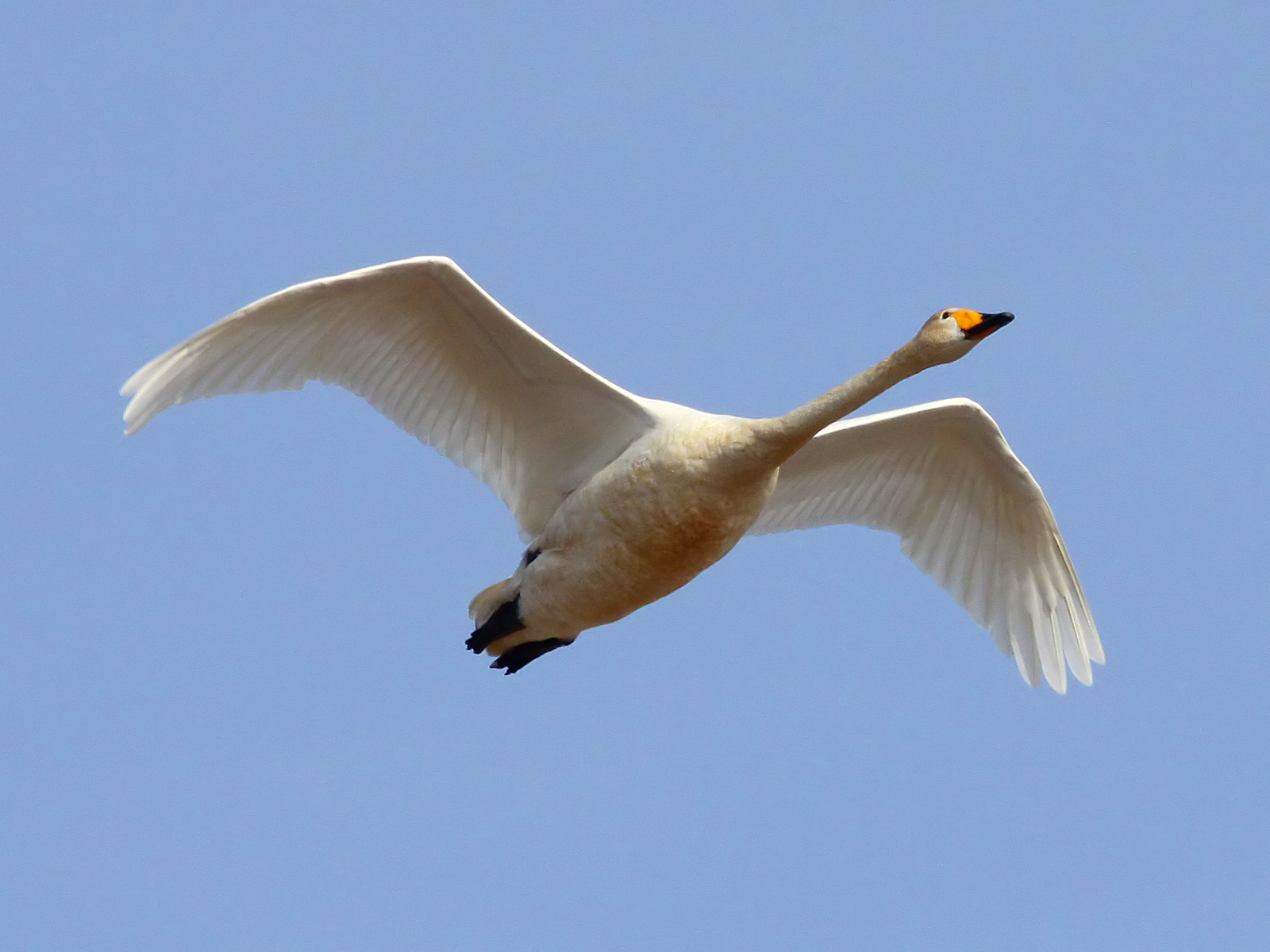
Whooper swan, the national bird

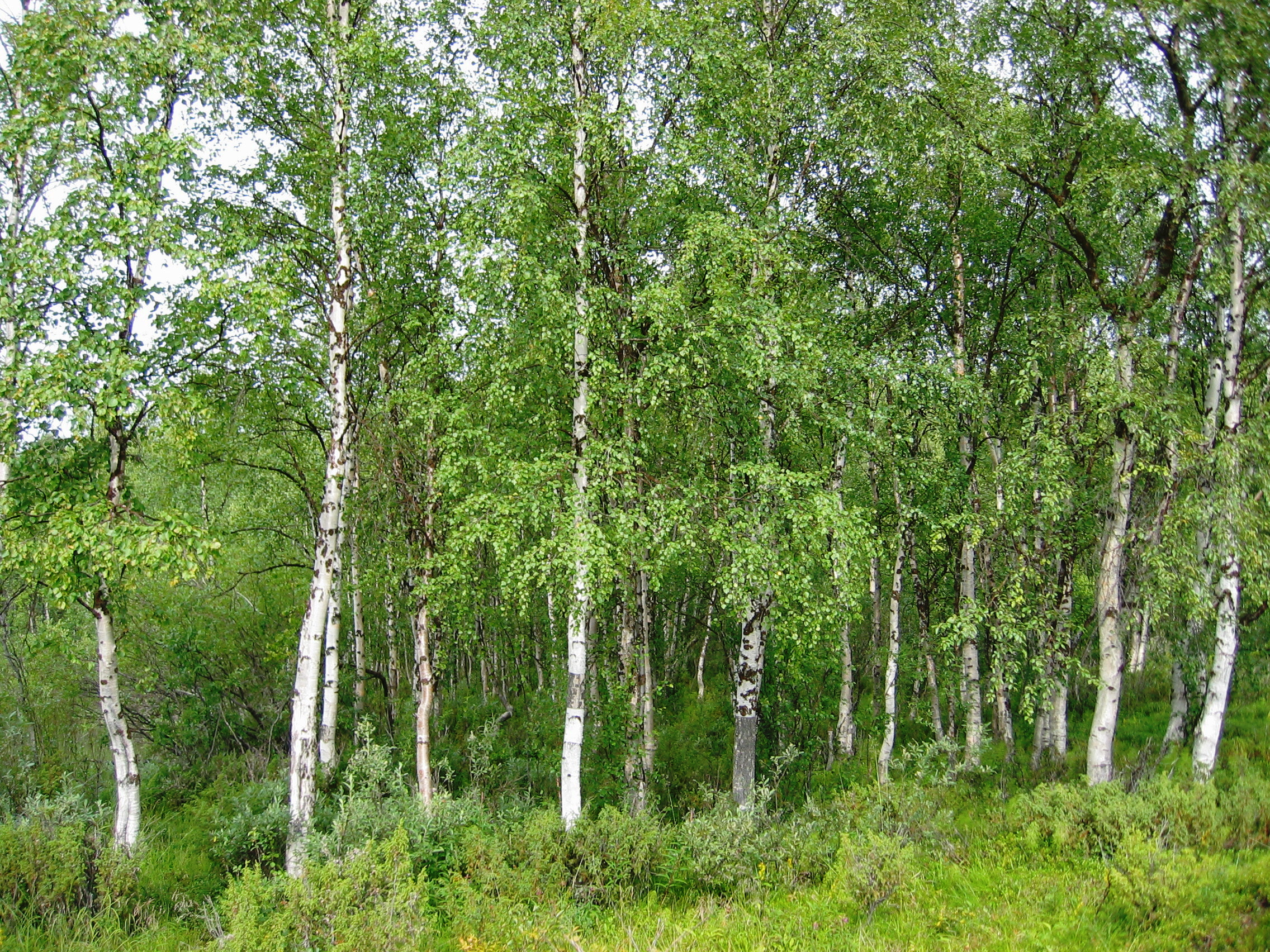
Silver birch, the national tree

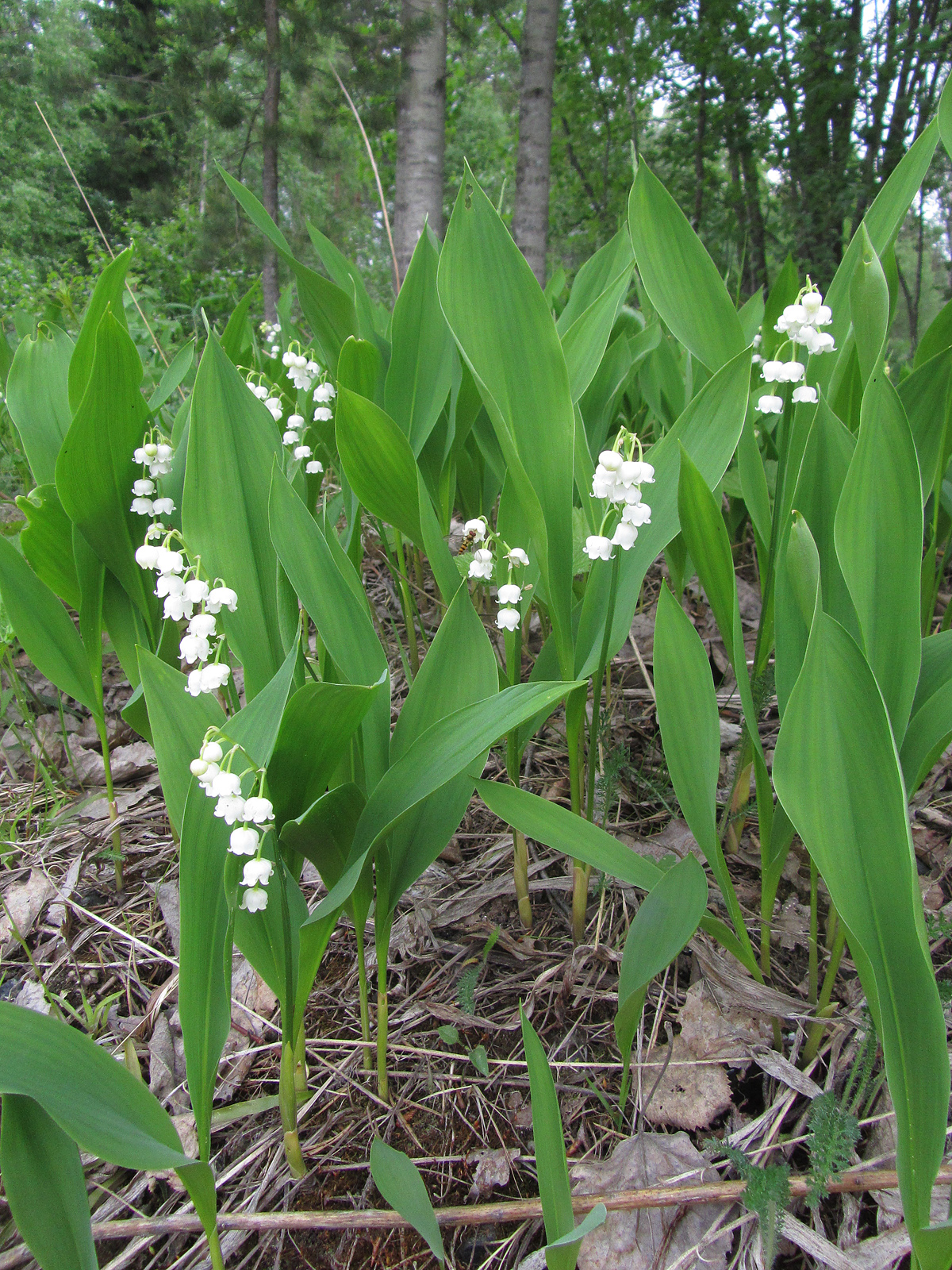
Lily of the valley, the national flower

The number of species living in Finland has been estimated to be at least 45,000. Known fauna consists of 27,000 species, flora of 4,500 species and fungi 7,500 species. The largest group is insects, over 20,000 identified species and an estimated total 30,000 species total. The following estimates of numbers of species in groups are primarily based on the 2010 Red List of Finnish Species.

=== Birds ===
In all, 468 species of birds have been observed. Of these, 256 are nesting species. The most common breeding birds are the willow warbler, common chaffinch, and redwing. The whooper swan is Finland's national bird.

=== Mammals ===
A total of 80 species of mammals have been observed in Finland. The Saimaa ringed seal (Pusa hispida saimensis) is an endemic subspecies restricted to Lake Saimaa.

In 2015 assessment of endangered Finnish bird and mammal species, mammal species classified as threatened included Natterer's bat (Myotis nattereri endangered), Nathusius' pipistrelle (Pipistrellus nathusi vulnerable), Arctic fox (Vulpes lagopus critically endangered), gray wolf (Canis lupus endangered), wolverine (Gulo gulo endangered), European polecat (Mustela putorius vulnerable) and Saimaa ringed seal (Pusa hispida saimensis endangered).

=== Insects ===
Over 20,000 species of insects have been identified in Finland. These include

- Bristletails (Thysanura): 6
- Leapers (Orthoptera): 32
- Earwigs (Dermaptera): 3
- Cockroaches (Blattodea): 4
- True bugs (Hemiptera): 1542
- Net-winged insects (Neuroptera): 57
- Dobsonflies and fishflies (Megaloptera): 5
- Snakeflies (Raphidioptera): 3
- Scorpionflies (Mecoptera): 6
- Booklice (Psocoptera): 71
- Thrips (Thysanoptera): 151
- Caddisflies (Trichoptera): 218
- Butterflies and moths (Lepidoptera): 2559
- Flies and mosquitoes (Diptera): 6400
- Twisted-winged parasites (Strepsiptera): 5
- Fleas (Siphonaptera): 54
- Ants, bees and wasps (Hymenoptera): 7100
- Beetles (Coleoptera): 3697

Insects unique to Finland include a leafroller moth Exapate bicuspidella, a grass-miner moth Elachista saarelai, a braconid wasp Phaenocarpa ungulosetosa, an ichneumon wasp Fennomacrus koponeni, and a chalcidoid wasp Anaphes crassipennis.

=== Other animals ===
- Reptiles (Reptilia): 5
- Fishes (Pisces s.l.): 102
- Amphibians (Amphibia): 7
- Annelids (Annelida): 179
- Molluscs (Mollusca): 165
- Arachnids (Arachnida): 2200
- Crustaceans (Crustacea): 350
- Myriapods (Myriapoda): 63

=== Plants ===
A total of 3,550 species of vascular plants, 892 bryophytes and 1832 lichens have been identified in Finland.

The only endemic vascular plants in Finland are microspecies of dandelions and hawkweeds.

=== Fungi ===
At the moment, 5584 species of Fungi and Myxomycetes (Protista) have been identified in Finland. Roughly 200 species are edible, and people commonly pick around 10 species which are relatively easy to find and identify. It has been estimated that around 40% of people in Finland pick wild mushrooms multiple times a year.

Finland's most important commercial varieties of forest mushrooms are cep (Boletus edulis) and northern milkcap (Lactarius trivialis).

Fungi are further classified to

- Agaricoid & Boletoid fungi: 1,821 species
- Aphyllophorales & Heterobasidiomycetes: 950
- Gasteromycetoid fungi: 79
- Pucciniomycetes, Ustilaginomycotina: 407
- Ascomycota: 2,106
- Myxomycetes: 204

== Threatened habitat types and protected areas ==
According to an evaluation finished in 2008, there are fewer than 400 habitats in Finland and 51% are endangered. The most seriously endangered habitats are 52, of which over half are traditional rural biotopes, such as meadows. The threat assessment was based on changes in the number and quality of the habitat type from the 1950s to the 2000s. According to the study, the main reasons for the threats to the habitat types were forestry, drainage for forestry (ditching), eutrophication of water bodies, clearing of agricultural land, and water engineering.

Nature reserves, wilderness areas and hiking areas established on state-owned lands are the central parts of the protected area system in Finland. Almost all of these are included in the European Union's network of Natura 2000 areas. In 2012 Finland had 1,865 Natura 2000 areas, the combined area of which measures 49,000 km^{2} or 15% of Finland's territory.
