= Constantino Pandiani =

Italian sculptor

Constantino Pandiani (1837–1922) was an Italian sculptor.

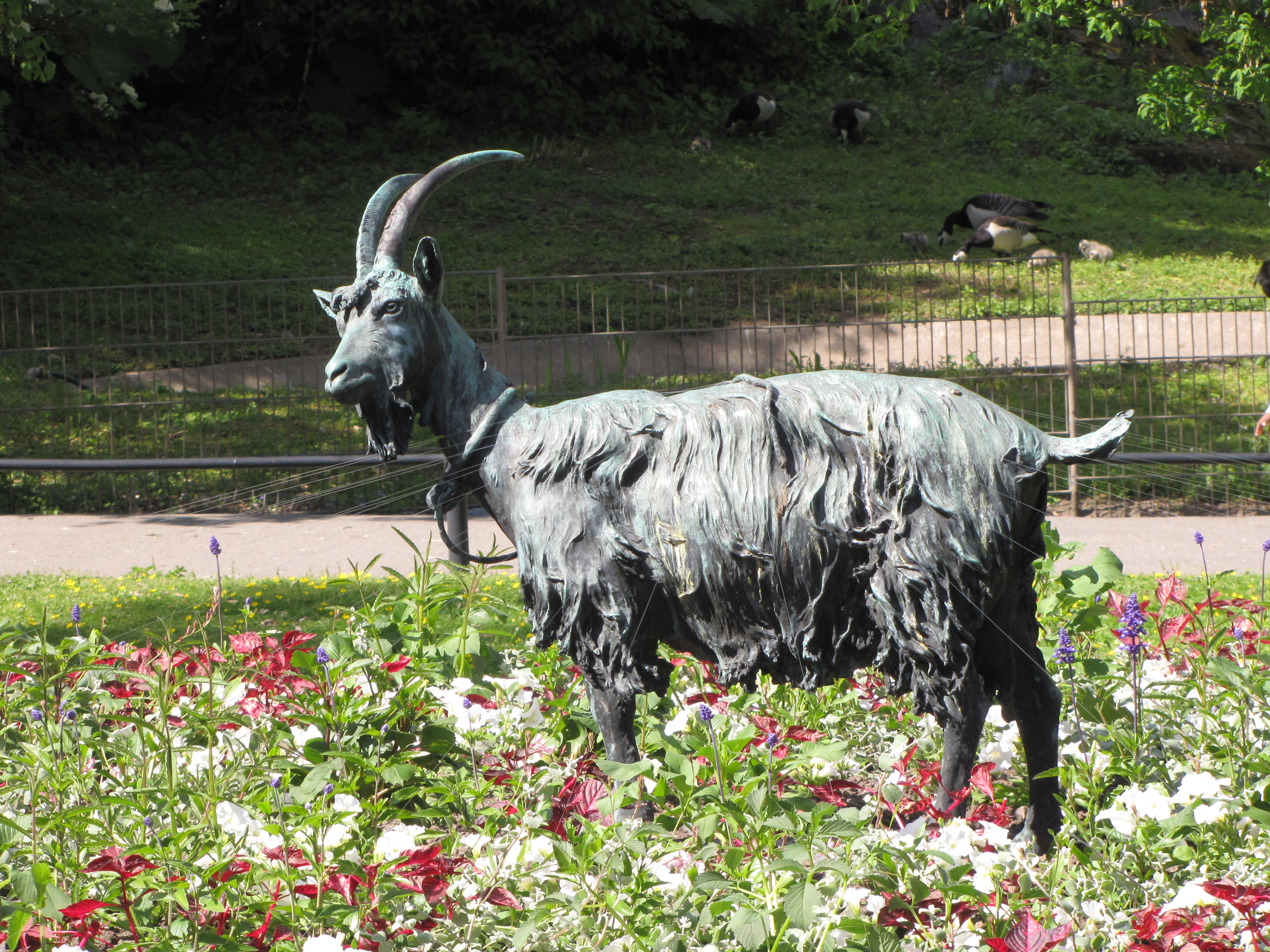
Pukki in Korkeasaari Zoo, Helsinki

== Biography ==
He was a resident of Milan, and born into a family of sculptors and owners of a bronze foundery. Among the many exhibitions he sent works were: 1870 in Parma, a marble bust of Springtime and a marble statue of First Flower. In 1872 Milan, he exhibited Diavoletto-maschera In 1877, in Naples, La Vendemmia; Moses tramples the Crown of the Pharaoh; a putto in marble; and a marble statue of Menestrello e Diavoletto. At the 1880 Mostra of Turin, he exhibited a Temptation of Love and a Compiacenza materna; In 1881 Milan, in 1881, he exhibited the marble group a Temptation of Love. At the 1883 Milan exhibition, he displayed a marble Portrait-bust of A Man; a bronze and a marblePortafiori; and a marble bust of Portrait of a Lady. In 1886 in Milan, he exhibited La pesca and Portafiori, a marble fountain. He sculpted the bronze statue of a goat, called Pukki, found at Korkeasaari Zoo in Helsinki, Finland.
