= Korkeasaari Zoo's Wildlife Hospital =

Finland's largest treatment facility for injured or orphaned wild animals

- Korkeasaaren Villieläinsairaala
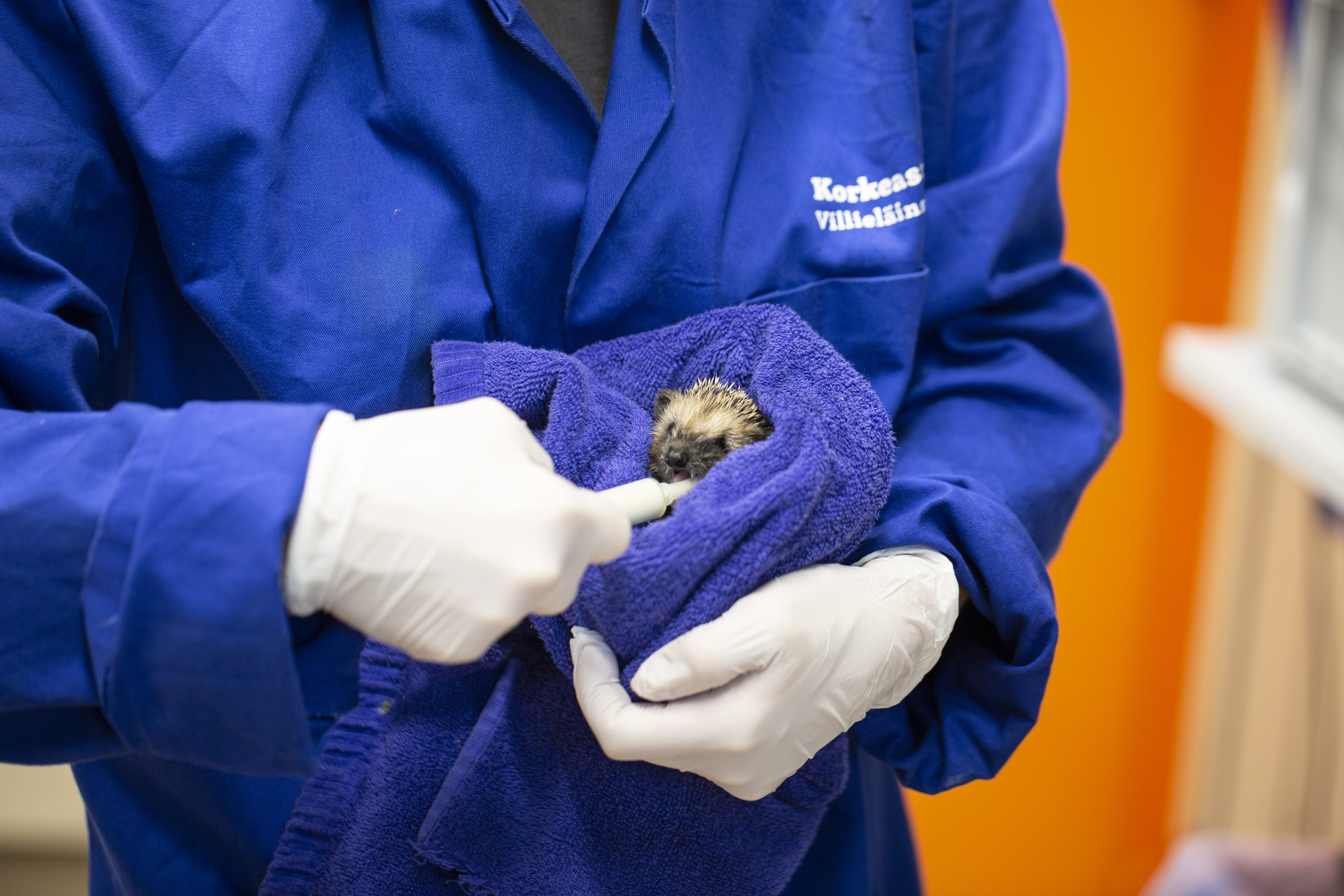
- Animalkeeper feeding a young hedgehog at the Wildlife Hospital
- Location: Helsinki, Finland
- Parent organization: Korkeasaari Zoo
- Website: korkeasaari.fi/elaimet-ja-suojelutyo/villielainsairaala/

Korkeasaari Zoo's Wildlife Hospital is Finland's largest wildlife rehabilitation centre. It is located in Helsinki and run by non-profit foundation of Korkeasaari Zoo.

The Wildlife Hospital takes care of injured or orphaned Finnish wildlife with the aim to return the animals back to the wild in full health. The Wildlife Hospital is not open to the public, but anyone can bring in patients by leaving them to the staff at Korkeasaari Zoo's gate.

Annually, over 1,000 animals in need of help are brought to the Wildlife Hospital. About one-third of all patients are hedgehogs and squirrels, and half are birds. Around 40% of the patients get fully rehabilitated. The Wildlife Hospital does not take care of invasive species.

Korkeasaari Zoo funds the operating costs of the Wildlife Hospital mainly from its own revenue, but it also gets support from the Finnish Ministry of Environment and private donors.

In 2017, the Wildlife Hospital got the Animal Conservation Act of the Year award from SEY Animal Welfare Finland.
