= Elachista saarelai =

Scientific classification
- Kingdom: Animalia
- Phylum: Arthropoda
- Class: Insecta
- Order: Lepidoptera
- Family: Elachistidae
- Genus: Elachista
- Species: E. saarelai

Binomial name
- Elachista saarelai Kaila & Sippola, 2010

Species of moth

Elachista saarelai is a moth of the family Elachistidae that is endemic to southern Finland.

The wingspan is 6–8.5 millimetres (0.24–0.33 in) for males and 7.5–9 millimetres (0.30–0.35 in) for females.

The larvae feed on Carex digitata and possibly Carex pediformis. They mine the leaves of their host plant.
