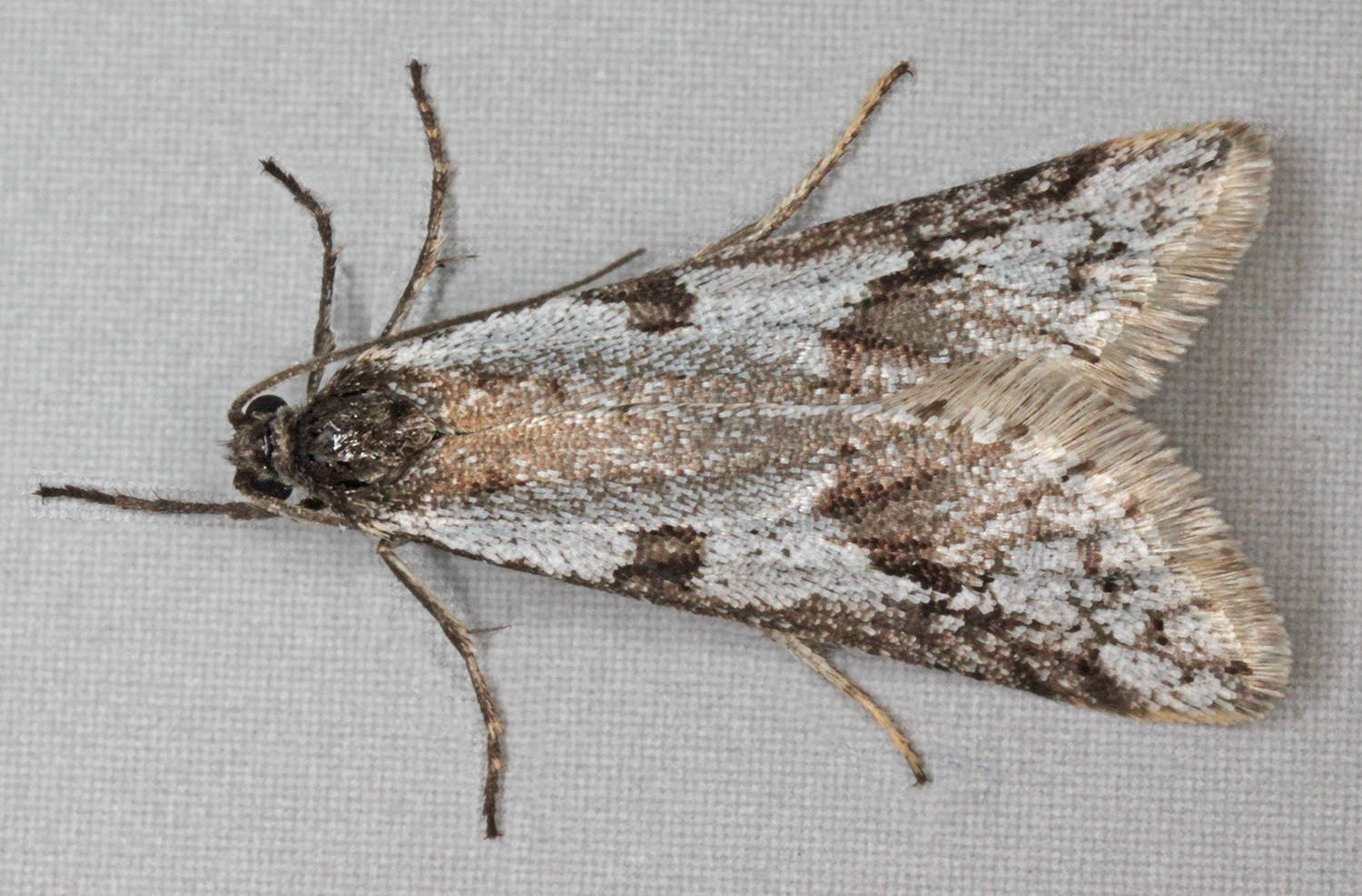
- Exapate congelatella, Trawscoed, North Wales

Scientific classification
- Kingdom: Animalia
- Phylum: Arthropoda
- Class: Insecta
- Order: Lepidoptera
- Family: Tortricidae
- Subfamily: Tortricinae
- Genus: Exapate; Hubner, [1825]

= Exapate =

Genus of tortrix moths

Exapate is a Palearctic genus of moths belonging to the subfamily Tortricinae of the family Tortricidae.

The Exapate is a moth commonly found in Britain with a preference for moorland in the northern regions. It has a wingspan of 18–22 mm with the males having elongated forewings. It is commonly found from October into December.

== Species ==
- Exapate bicuspidella Bruun & Krogerus, 1996
- Exapate congelatella (Clerck, 1759) North Europe, Central Europe
- Exapate duratella Heyden, 1864 South Europe

== See also ==
- List of Tortricidae genera
