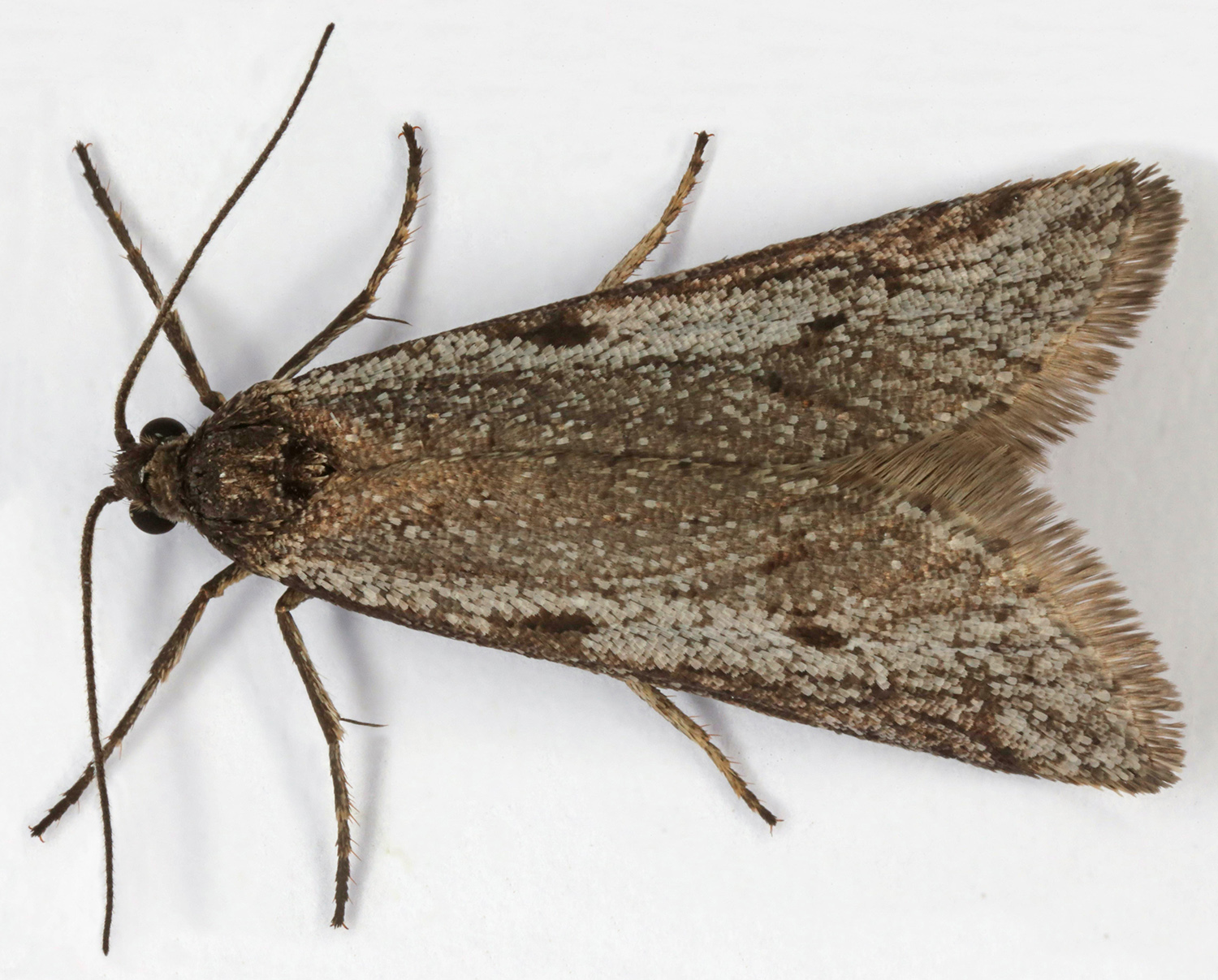

Scientific classification
- Kingdom: Animalia
- Phylum: Arthropoda
- Class: Insecta
- Order: Lepidoptera
- Family: Tortricidae
- Genus: Exapate
- Species: E. congelatella

Binomial name
- Exapate congelatella (Clerck, 1759)

= Exapate congelatella =

Species of moth

Exapate congelatella is a moth belonging to the family Tortricidae. The species was first described by Carl Alexander Clerck in 1759.

It is native to Europe.
