= Korkeasaari Zoo =

Zoo in Helsinki, Finland

Korkeasaari Zoo; (Korkeasaaren eläintarha)

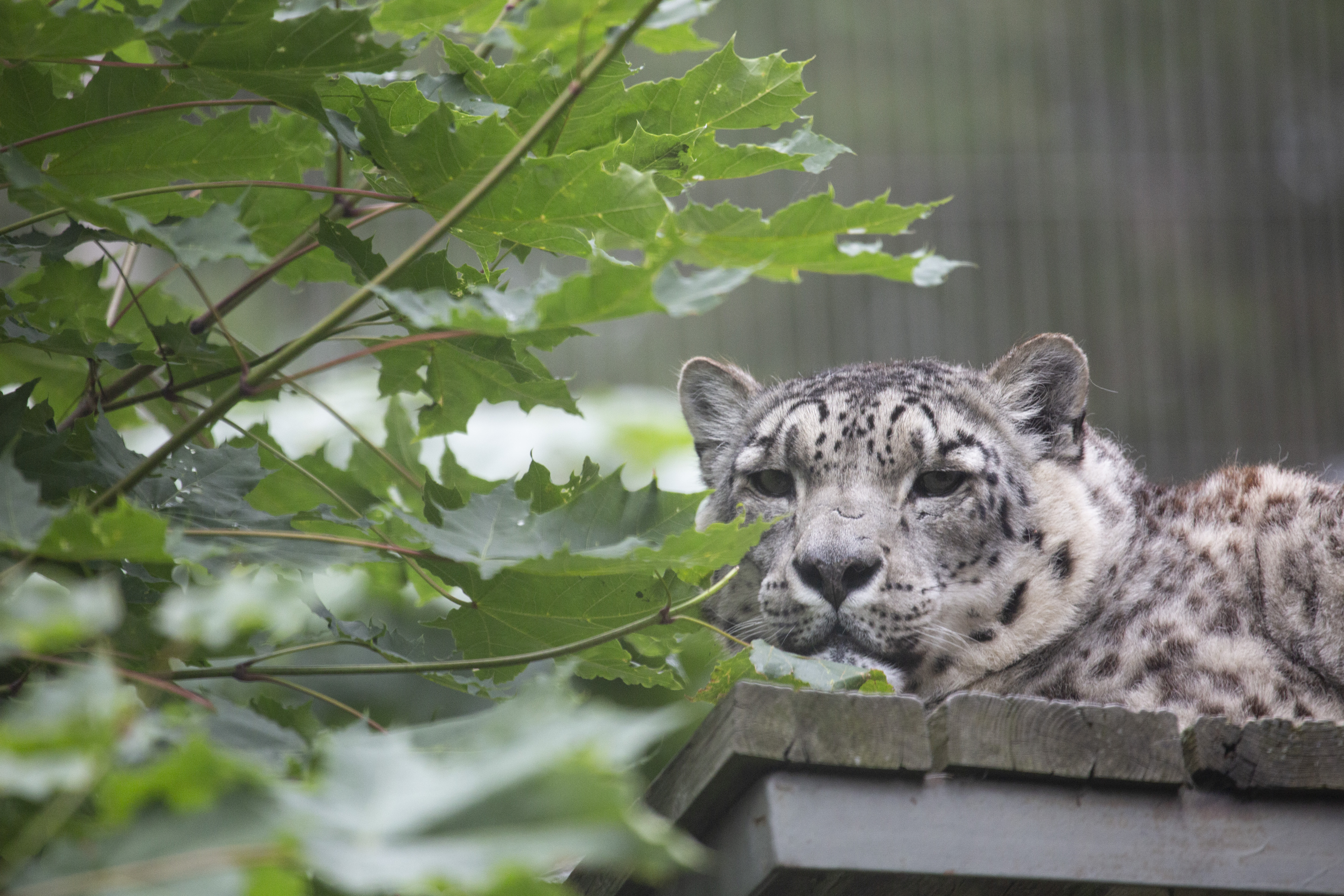
- A snow leopard in Korkeasaari Zoo
- Interactive map of: Korkeasaari Zoo; (Korkeasaaren eläintarha)
- 60°10′30″N 024°59′03″E
- Date opened: 1889; 137 years ago
- Location: Korkeasaari, Helsinki, Finland
- Land area: 22 ha (54 acres)
- No. of animals: 1500
- No. of species: 150
- Memberships: EAZA, WAZA, IUCN
- Owner: Korkeasaaren eläintarhan säätiö ("Foundation of Korkeasaari Zoo")
- Director: Sanna Hellström
- Website: www.korkeasaari.fi/en/

Korkeasaari Zoo (Finnish: Korkeasaaren eläintarha), also known as Helsinki Zoo, is the largest zoo in Finland, located in Helsinki's Korkeasaari island. The zoo was first opened in 1889. Today it is operated by a nonprofit foundation.

The zoo is among the most popular places among visitors in Helsinki. The Crown Bridges connect the zoo island to the mainland from the Helsinki districts Nihti and Laajasalo. There is also a bridge connection from Mustikkamaa.

== Conservation work ==
Korkeasaari Zoo is a full member of the European Association of Zoos and Aquaria (EAZA). It is also a member of the World Association of Zoos and Aquariums WAZA and the International Union for Conservation of Nature.

The zoo works with other modern zoos to maintain a healthy and viable zoo population with EAZA Ex-situ Programme and takes part in reintroduction programmes. Korkeasaari Zoo holds the European studbook for markhors, European forest reindeers and snowy owls and works as their conservation coordinator.

Korkeasaari Zoo operates a Wildlife Hospital for injured and orphaned wild animals. It also runs a nature school for children.

== History ==
Korkeasaari island was used by Helsinki residents for recreation before the zoo was established. A restaurant operated on the island in the late 19th century, but the consumption of alcoholic beverages caused disturbances. To curb these, the city leased Korkeasaari island to the Helsinki Liquor Company Helsingfors Utskänkningsaktiebolag as a public park, where the company would regulate the supply of alcohol and maintain order.

The company also started planning the establishment of a zoo in Helsinki to provide the public a more refined form of entertainment. The first official proposal to locate the zoo in Alppila was narrowly rejected in a city council vote. Instead, the original plan for a zoo in Korkeasaari island was realized in 1889. The liquor company was facing financial difficulties during World War I due to a temporary ban on the sale of alcohol. When Prohibition took effect in 1919, the company's finances collapsed, and the following year Korkeasaari Zoo became a property of the City of Helsinki.

The zoo operated under the Helsinki city administration until the end of 2017, after which it became a foundation. The Korkeasaari Zoo Foundation Korkeasaaren eläintarhan säätiö now maintains the zoo, manages its grounds and properties, and develops the zoo’s services. The foundation is a public benefit organization and does not seek to make a profit.

== Collection ==
At the end of 2025 there were 177 animal species in Korkeasaari Zoo, including mainly European or Asian species such as the Amur tiger, snow leopard, Przewalski's horse, Barbary macaque, snowy owl, bearded vulture and European otter. The collection has been selected so that outdoor animals can comfortably live in the climate of Finland: this means that many charismatic megafauna are absent.

Korkeasaari Zoo has two tropical buildings, Amazonia and Africasia, which include tropical species of small mammals, amphibians, snakes, birds, fish and insects.

Hamadryas baboons were housed in the zoo from the 1960s to 2013. They were replaced by Barbary macaques which are better suited for cold climate.

== Gallery ==
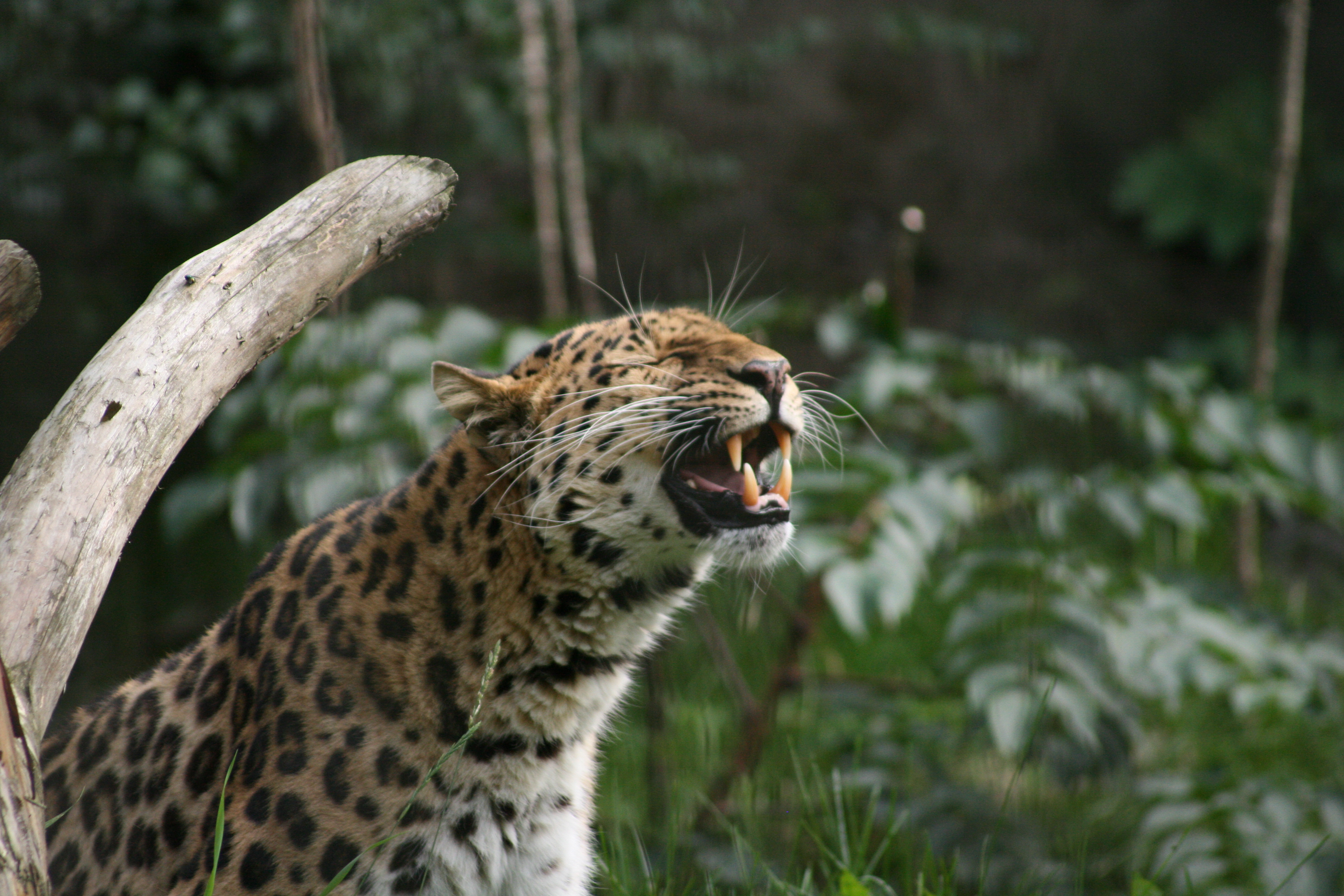
Panthera pardus orientalis

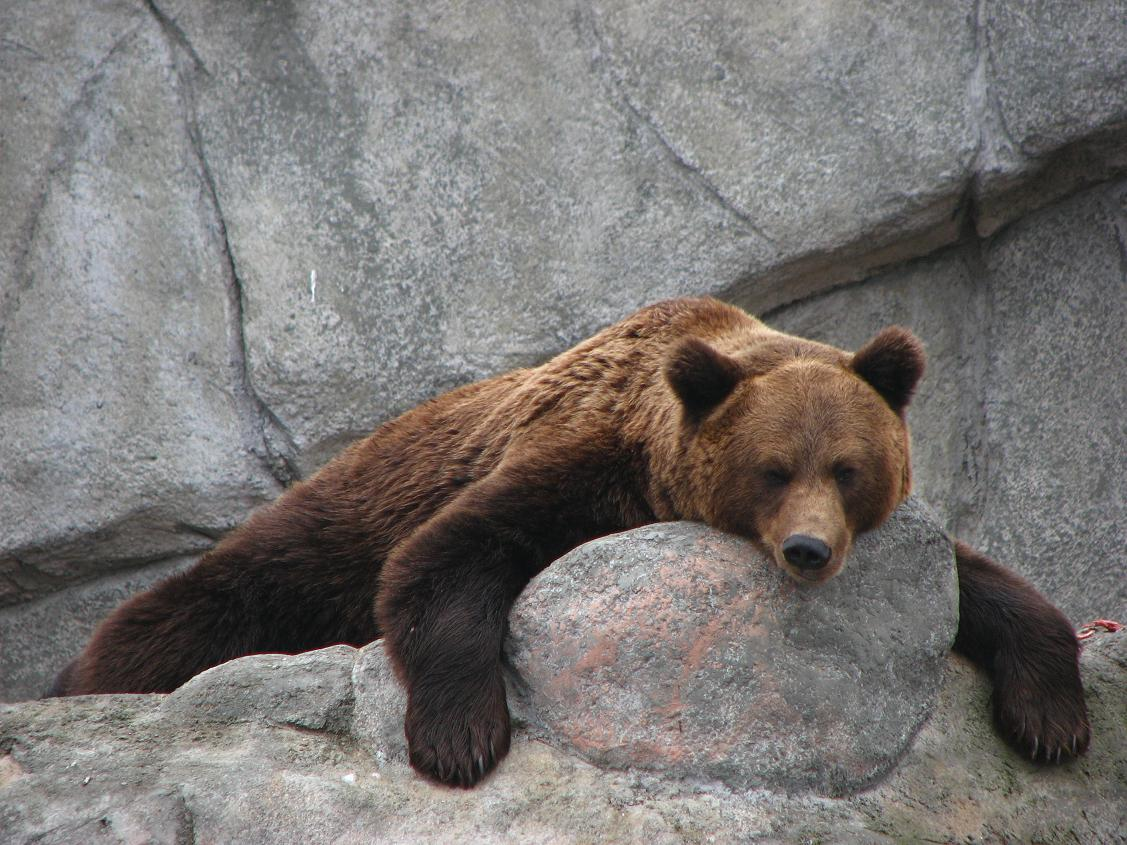
Ursus arctos

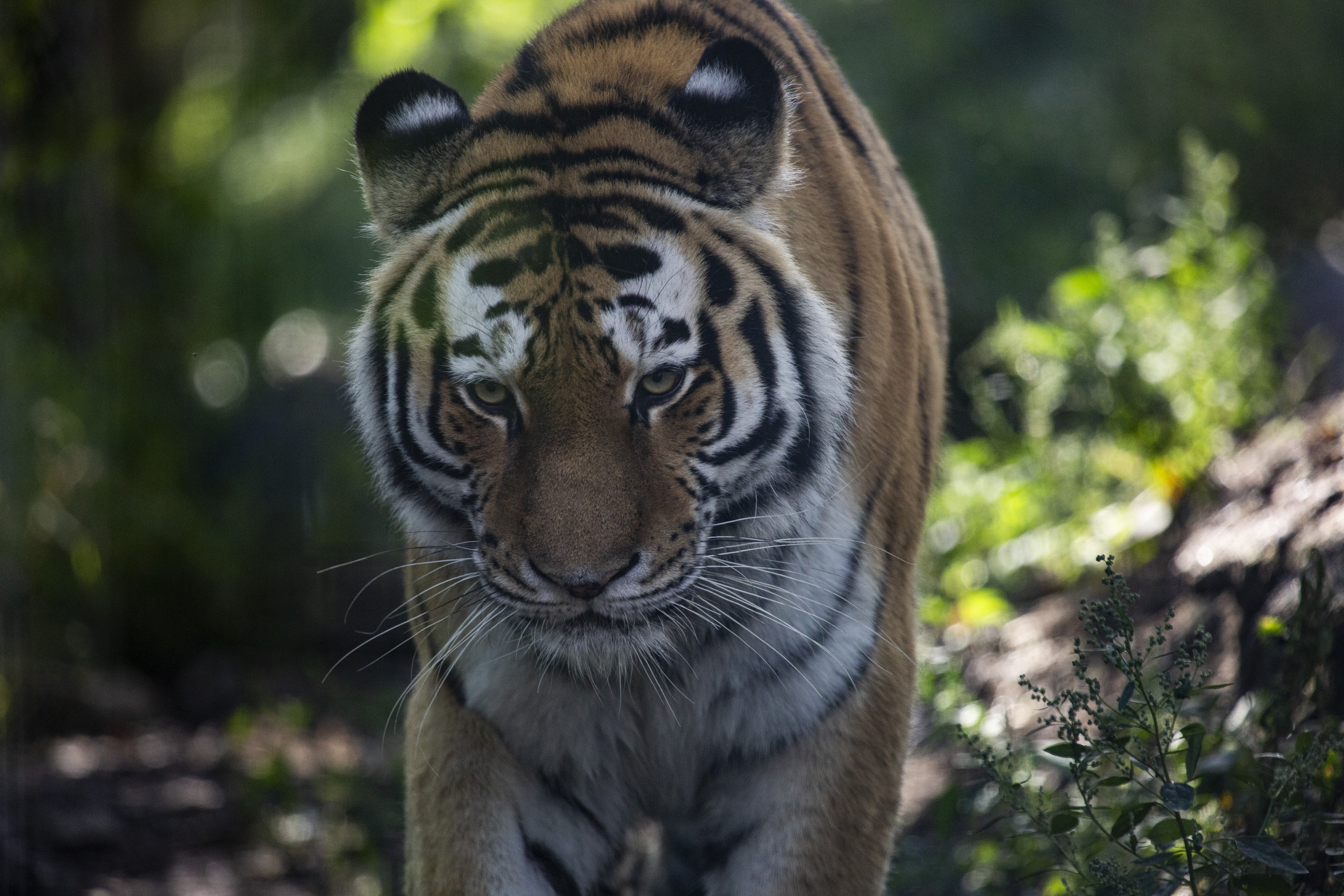
Panthera tigris tigris

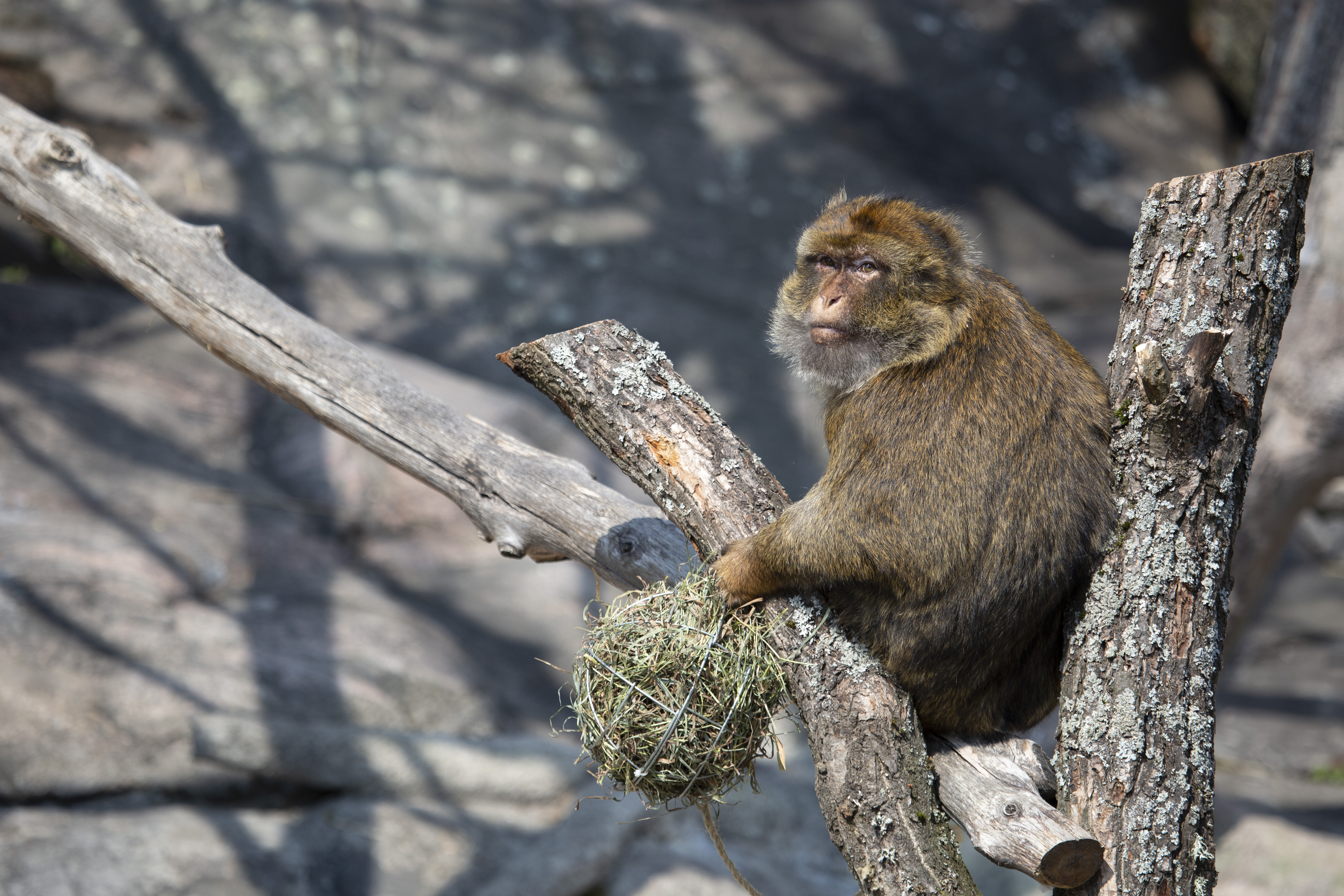
Macaca sylvanus

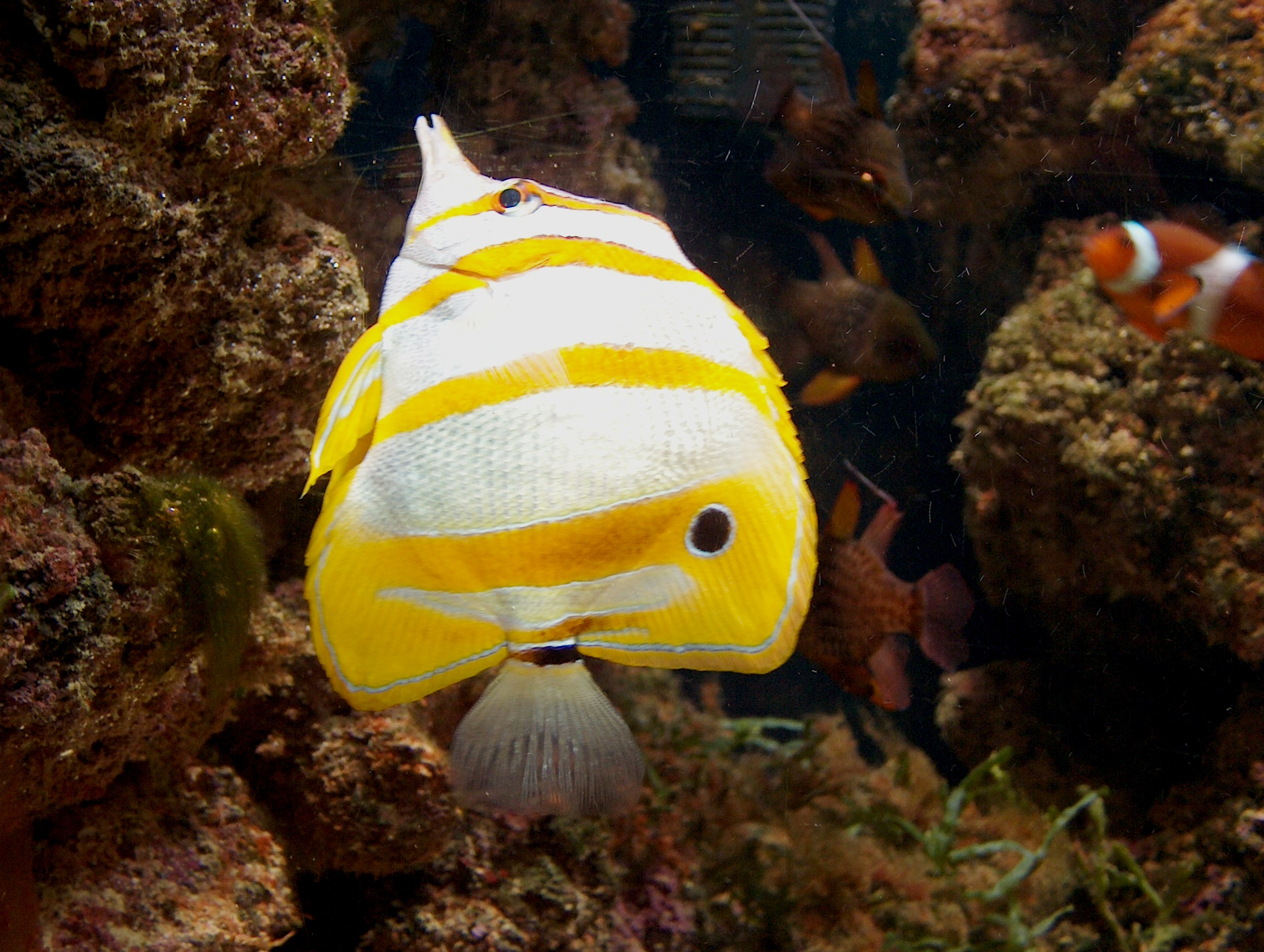
Chelmon rostratus

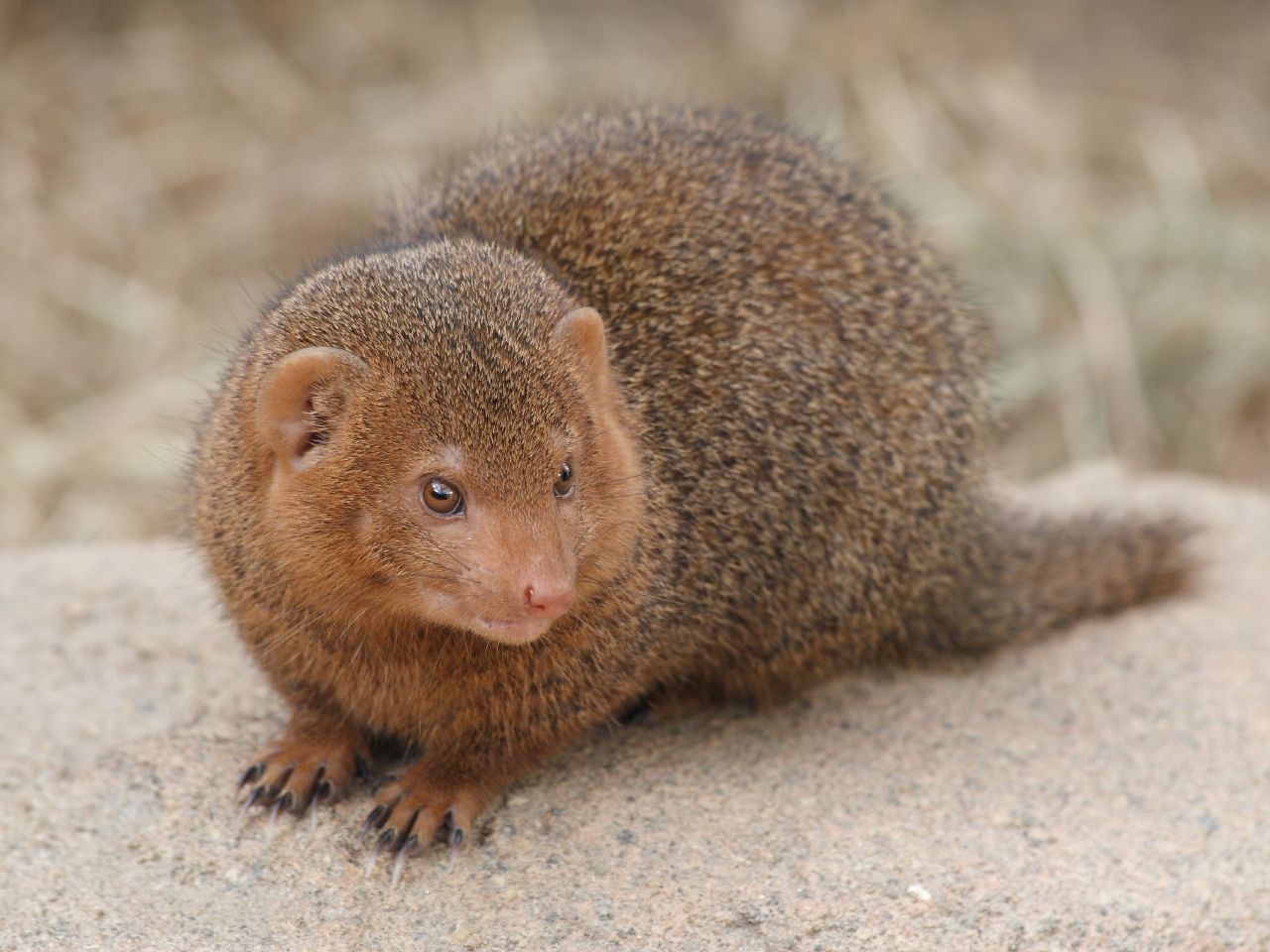
Helogale parvula

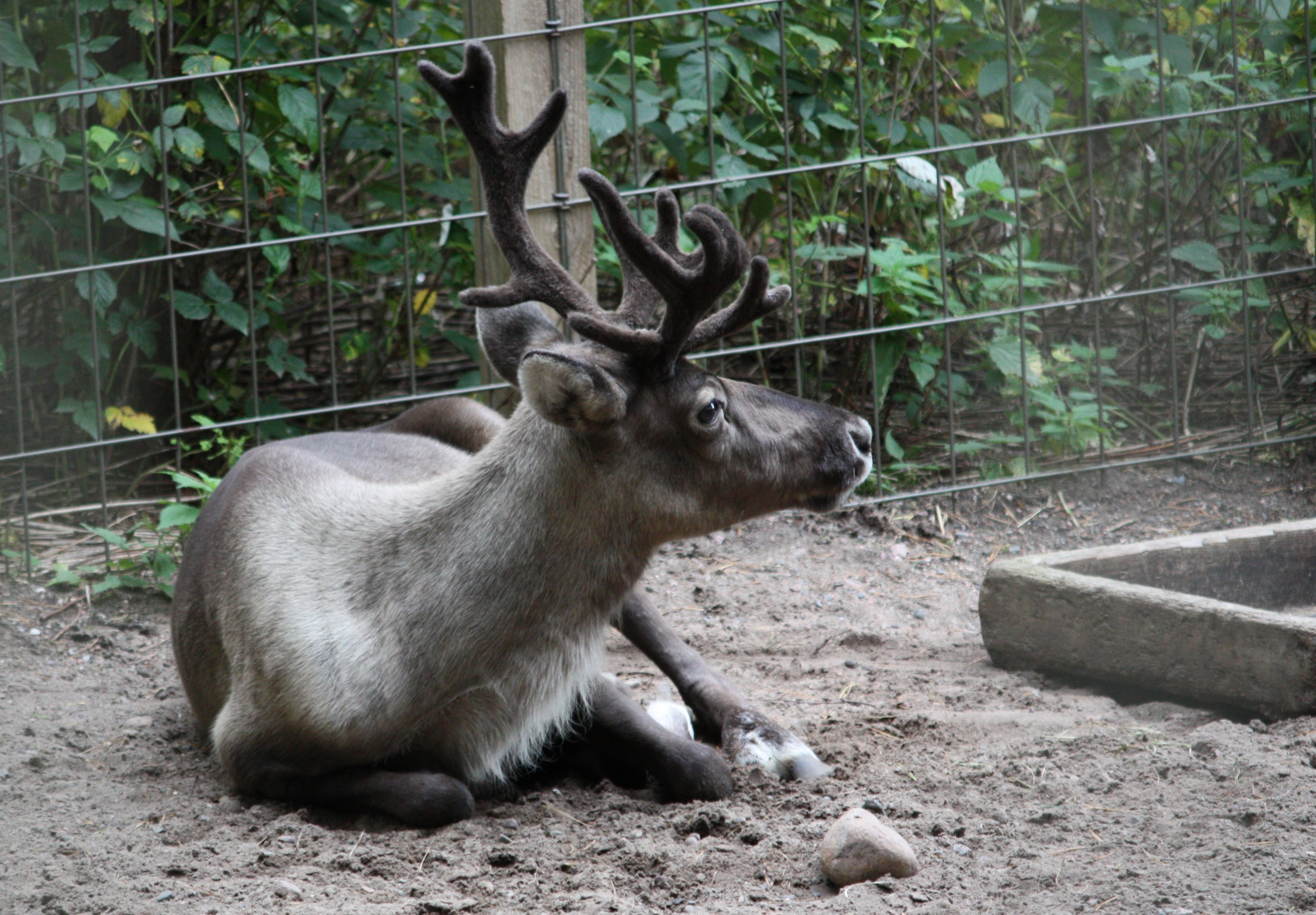
Rangifer tarandus fennicus

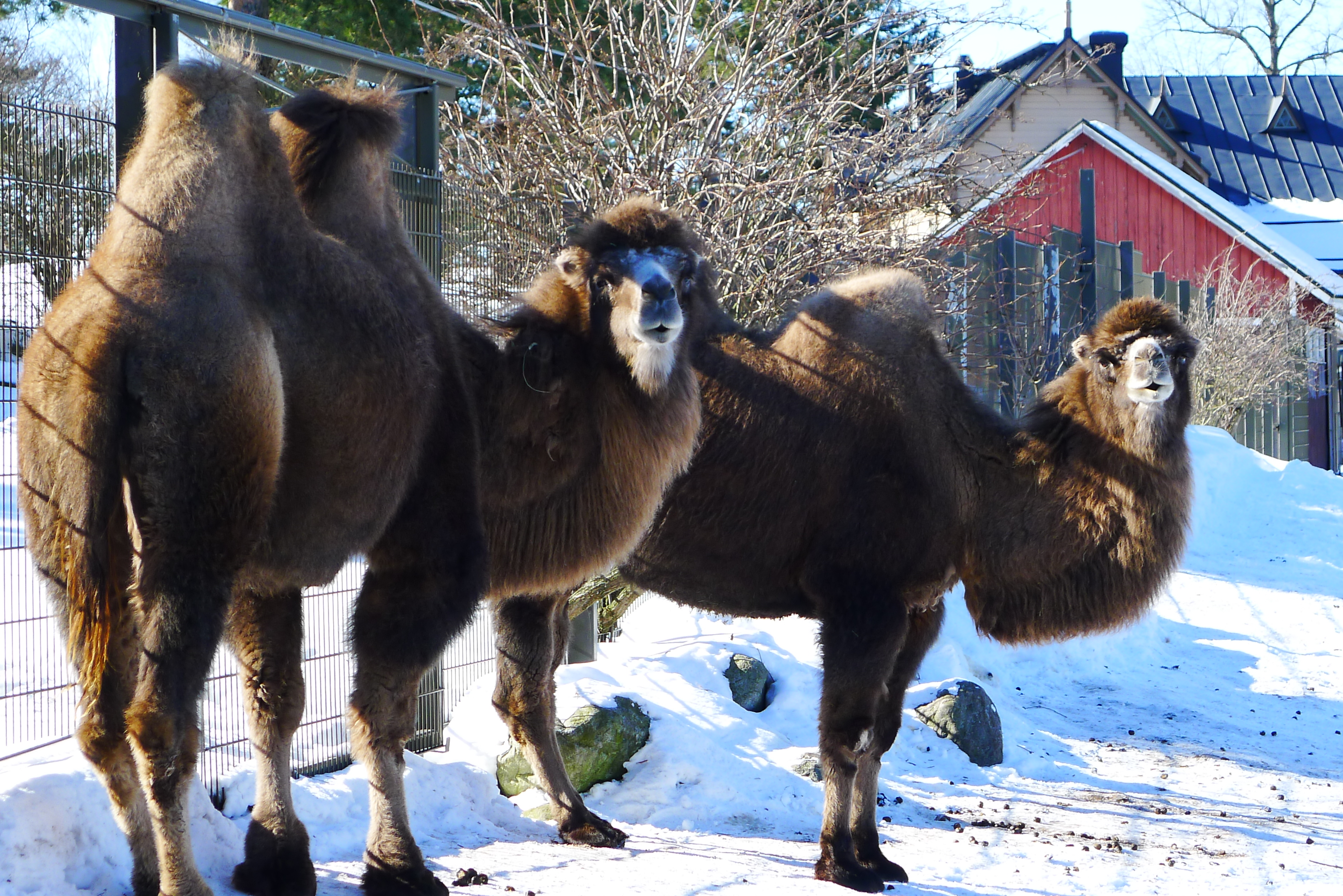
Camelus bactrianus

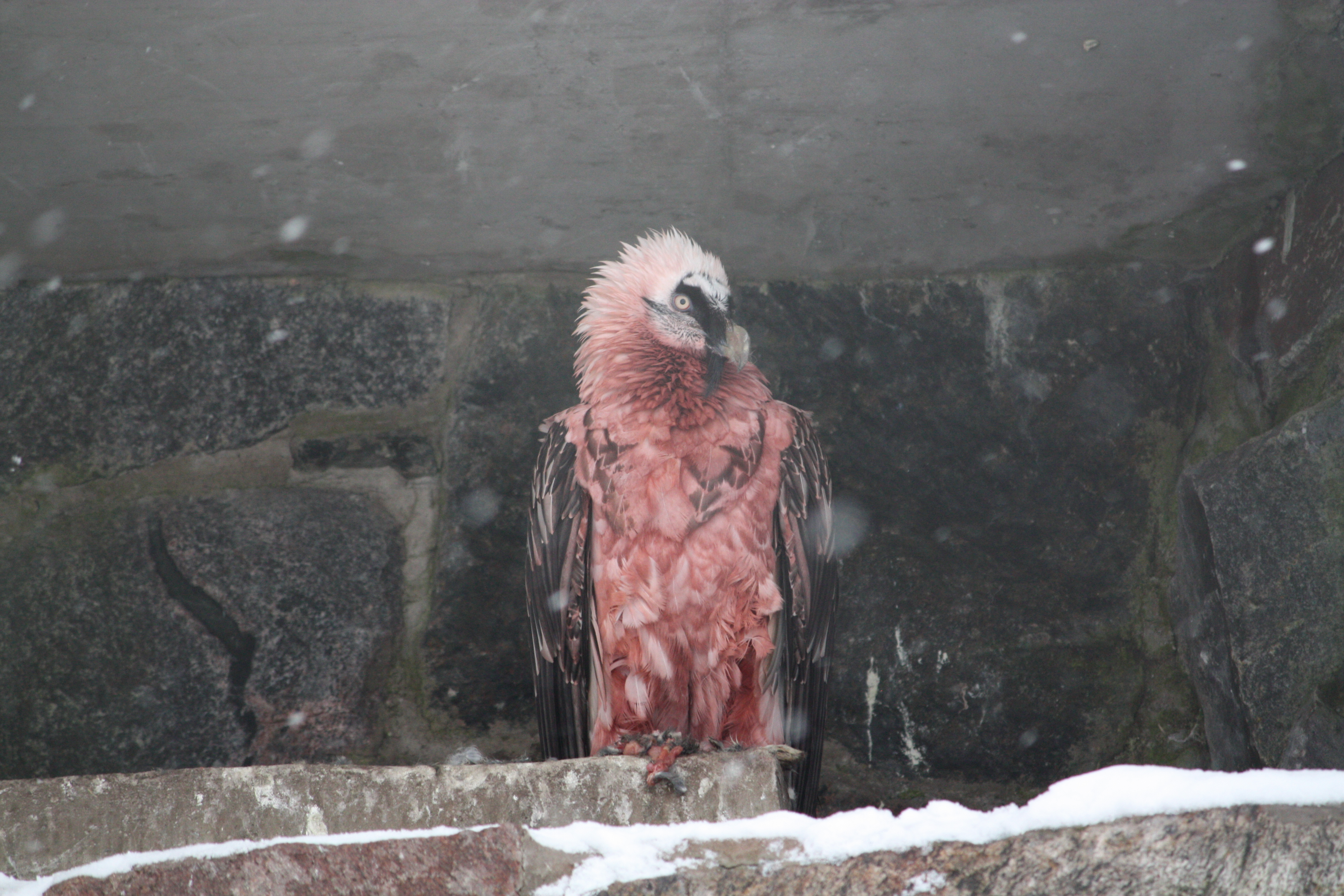
Bearded vulture

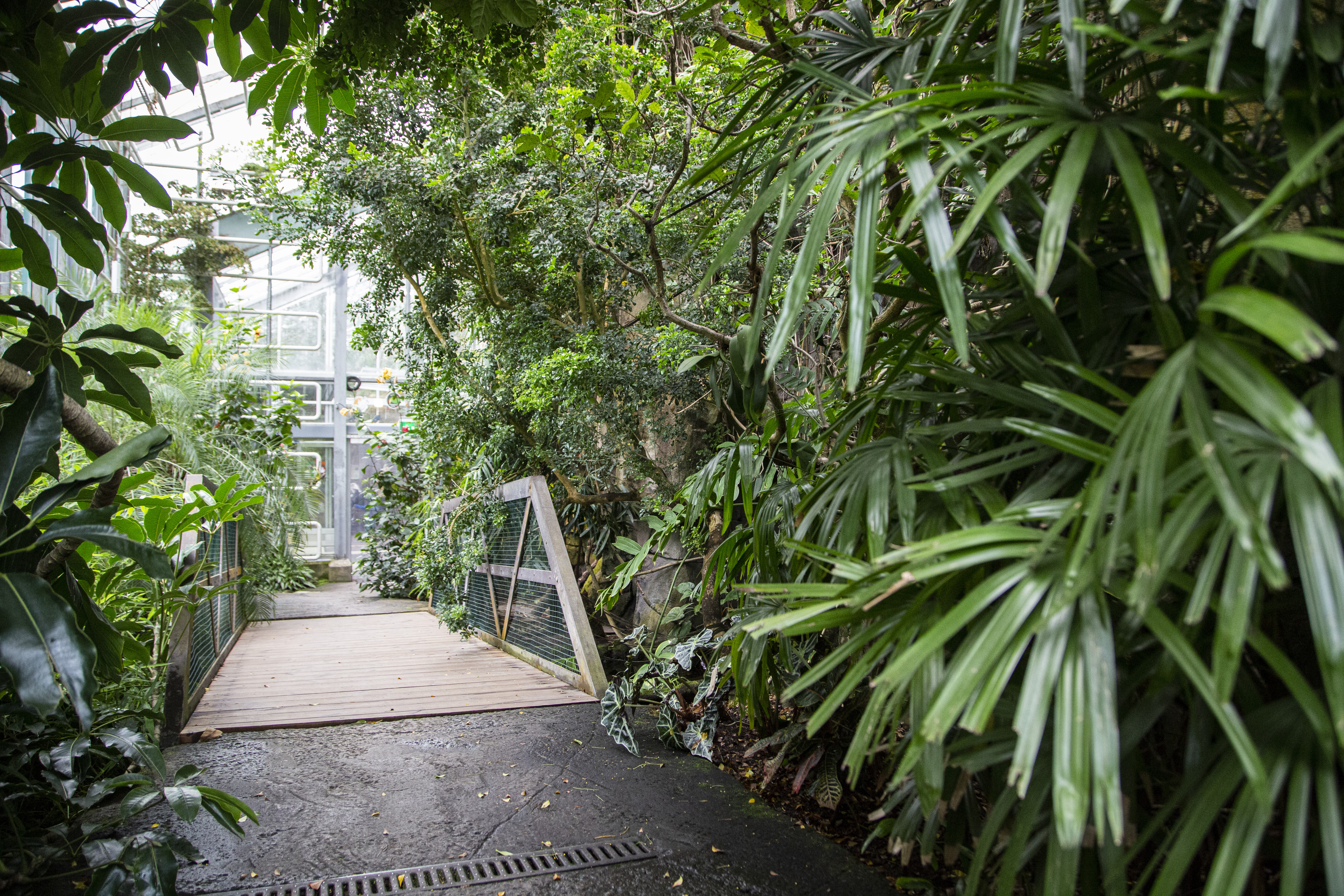
Tropical building Africasia.

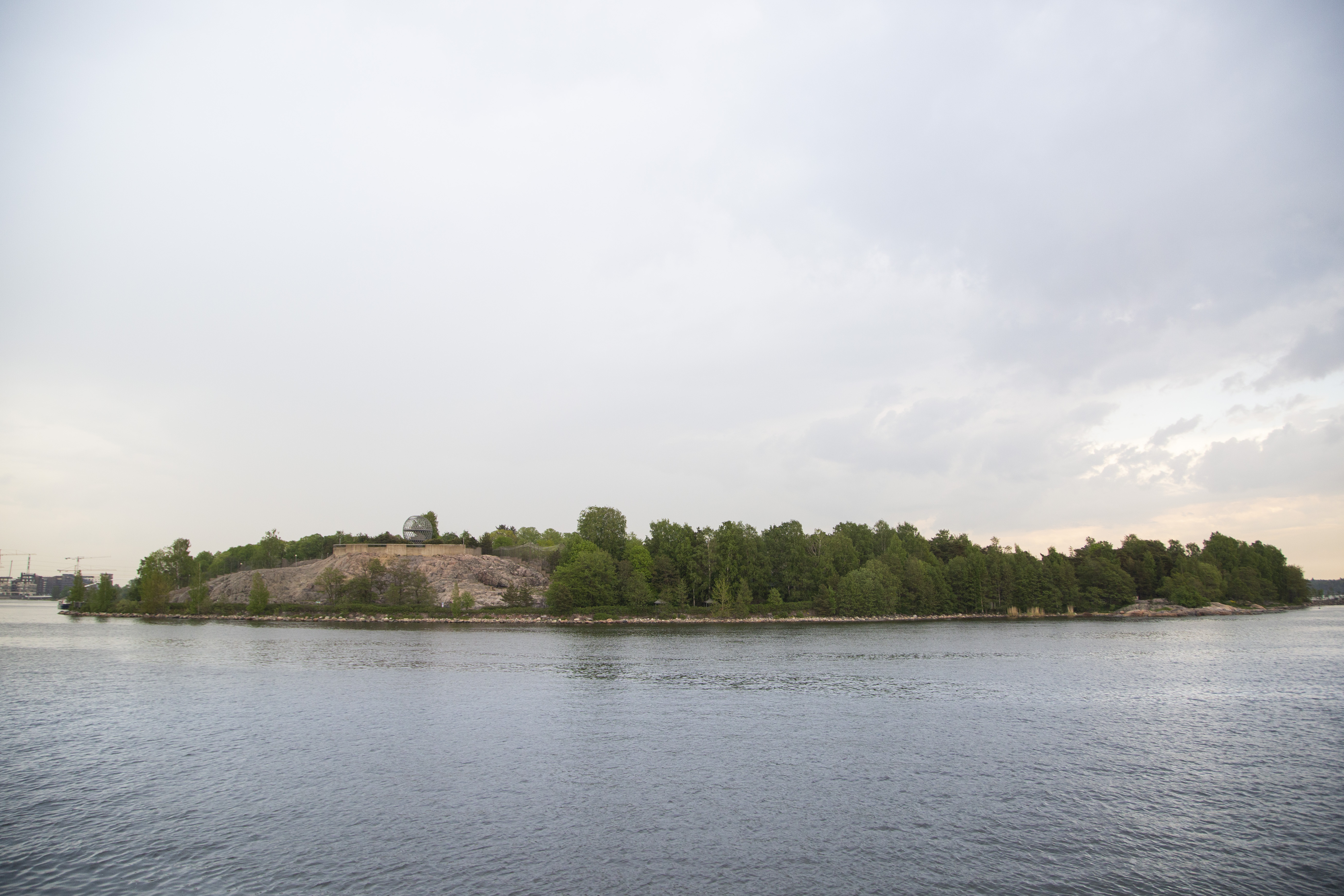
The zoo island.

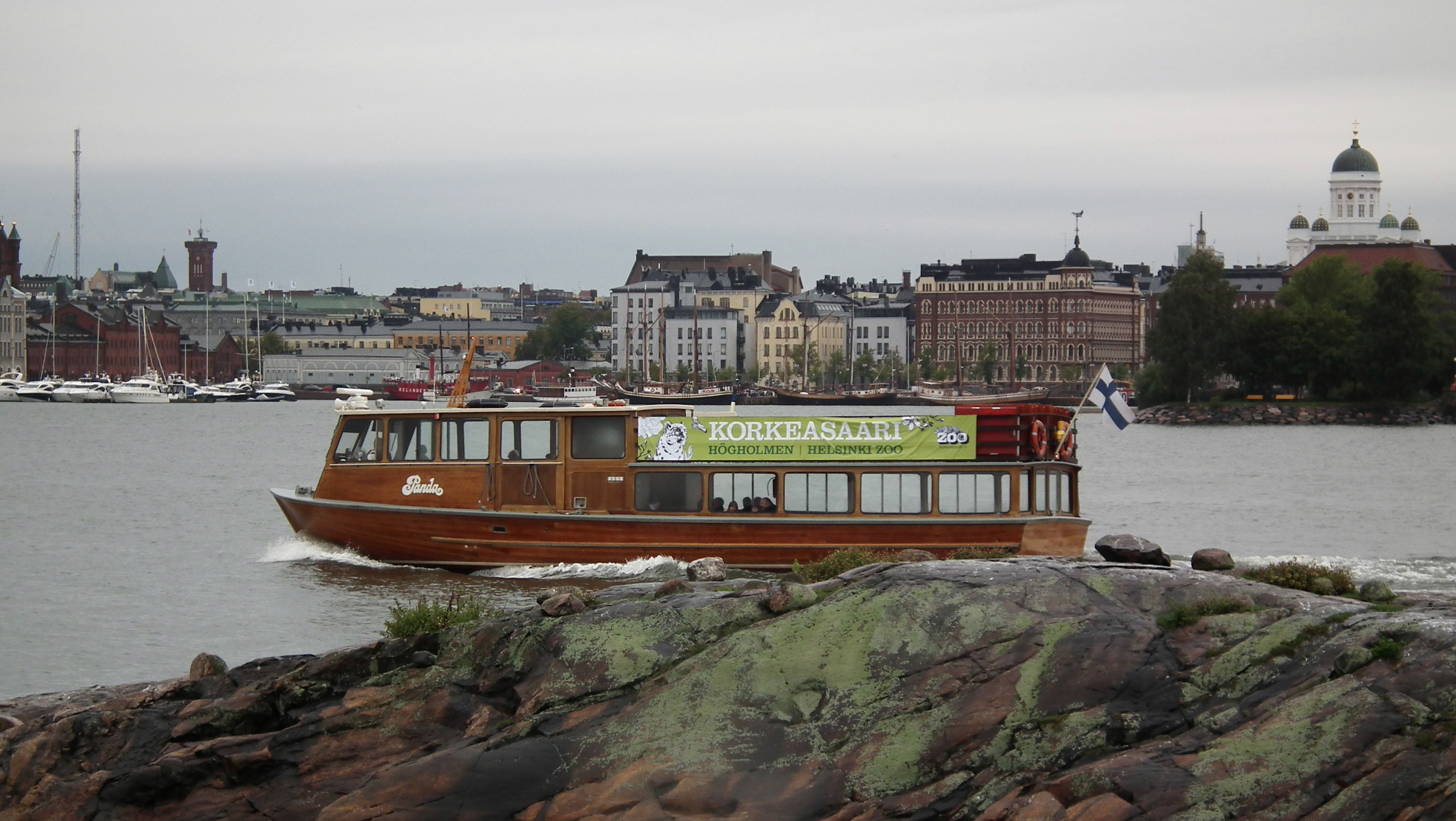
Korkeasaari ferry

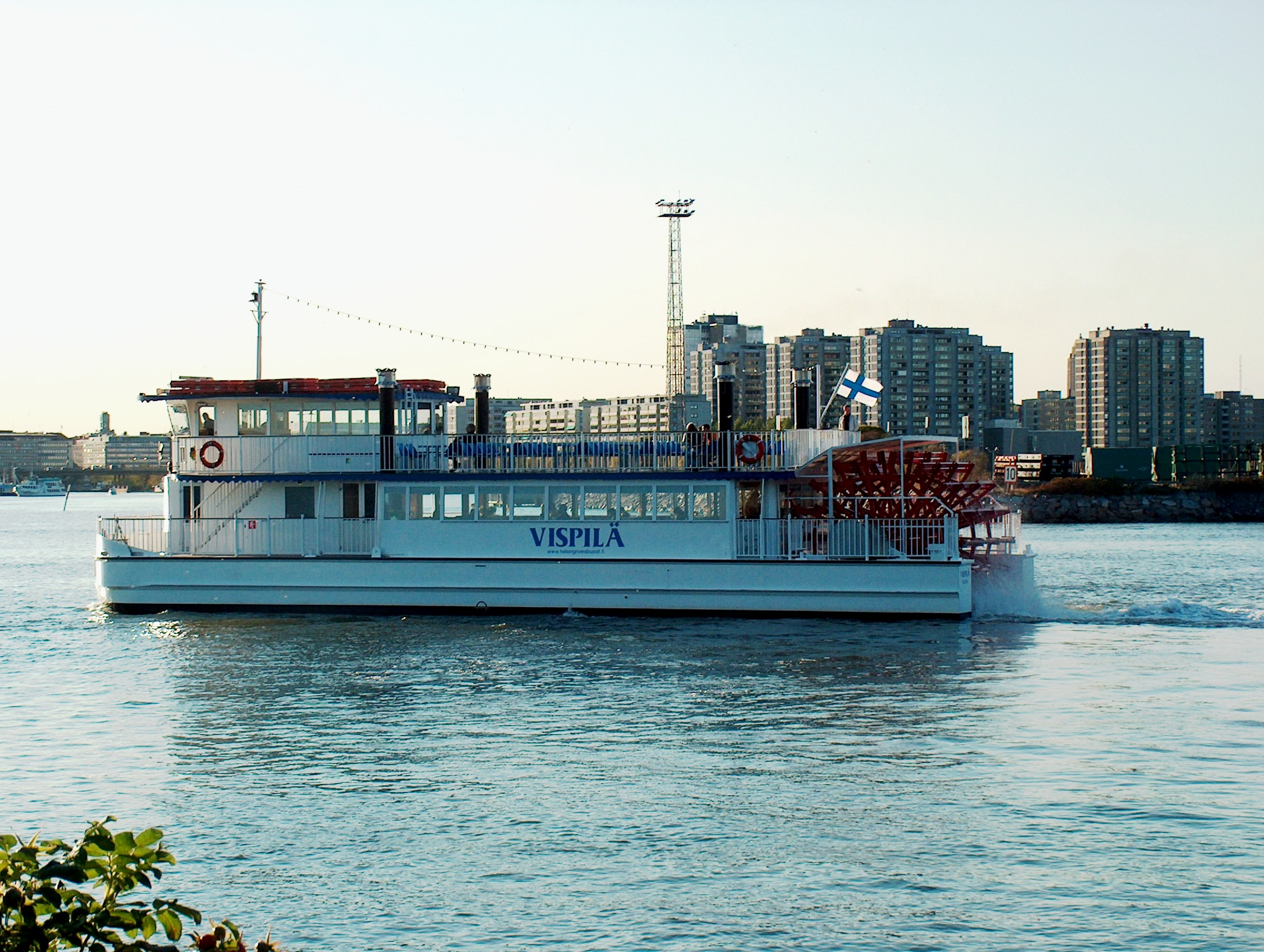
Paddle Steamer named Vispilä

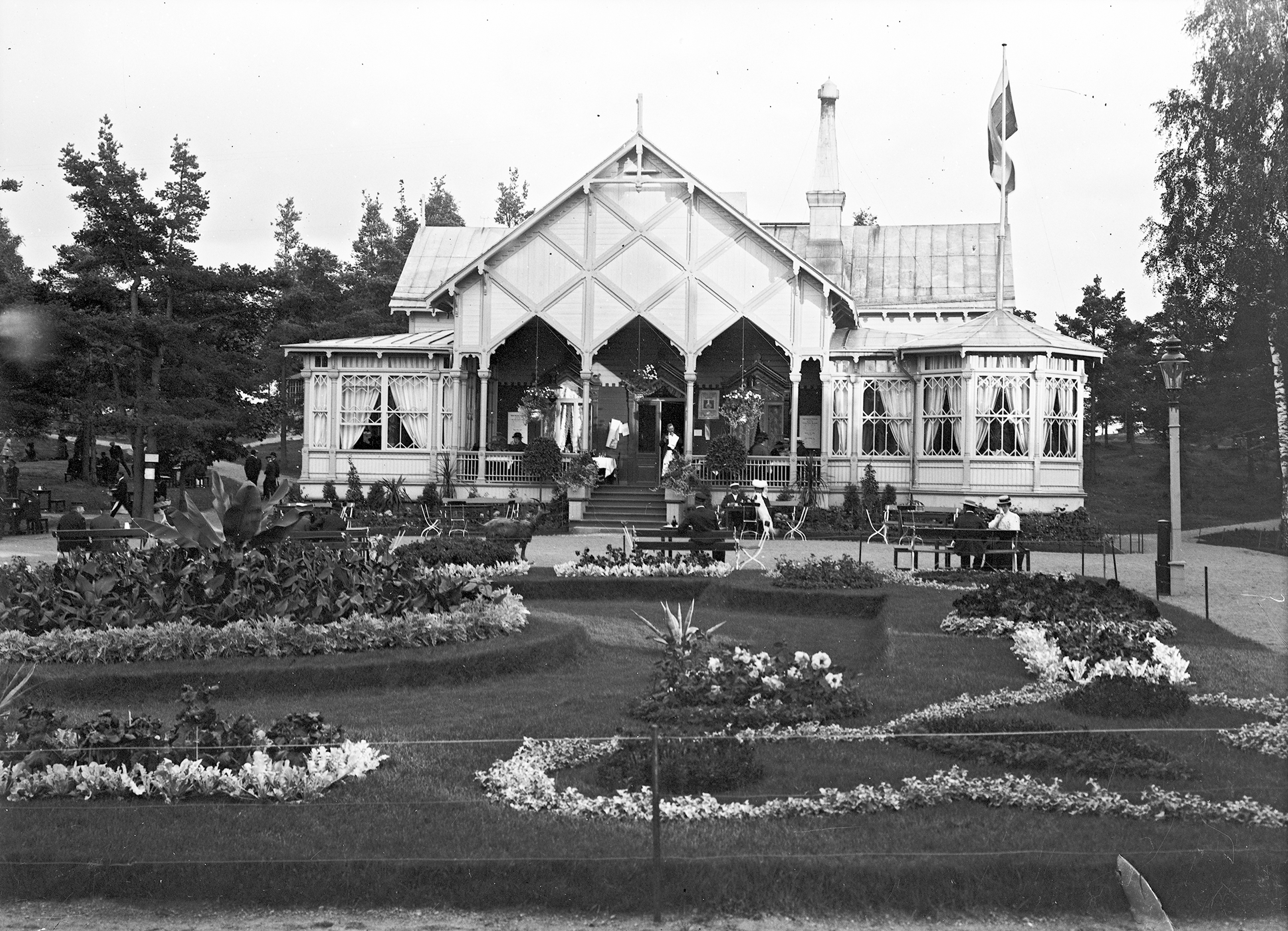
Korkeasaari restaurant at the turn of the 20th century.

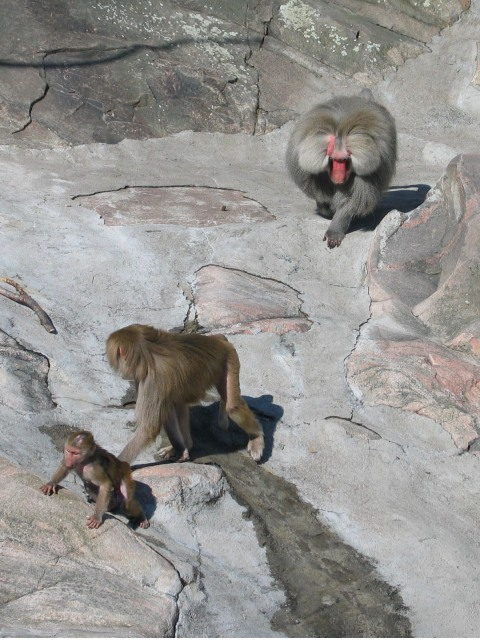
Baboons
