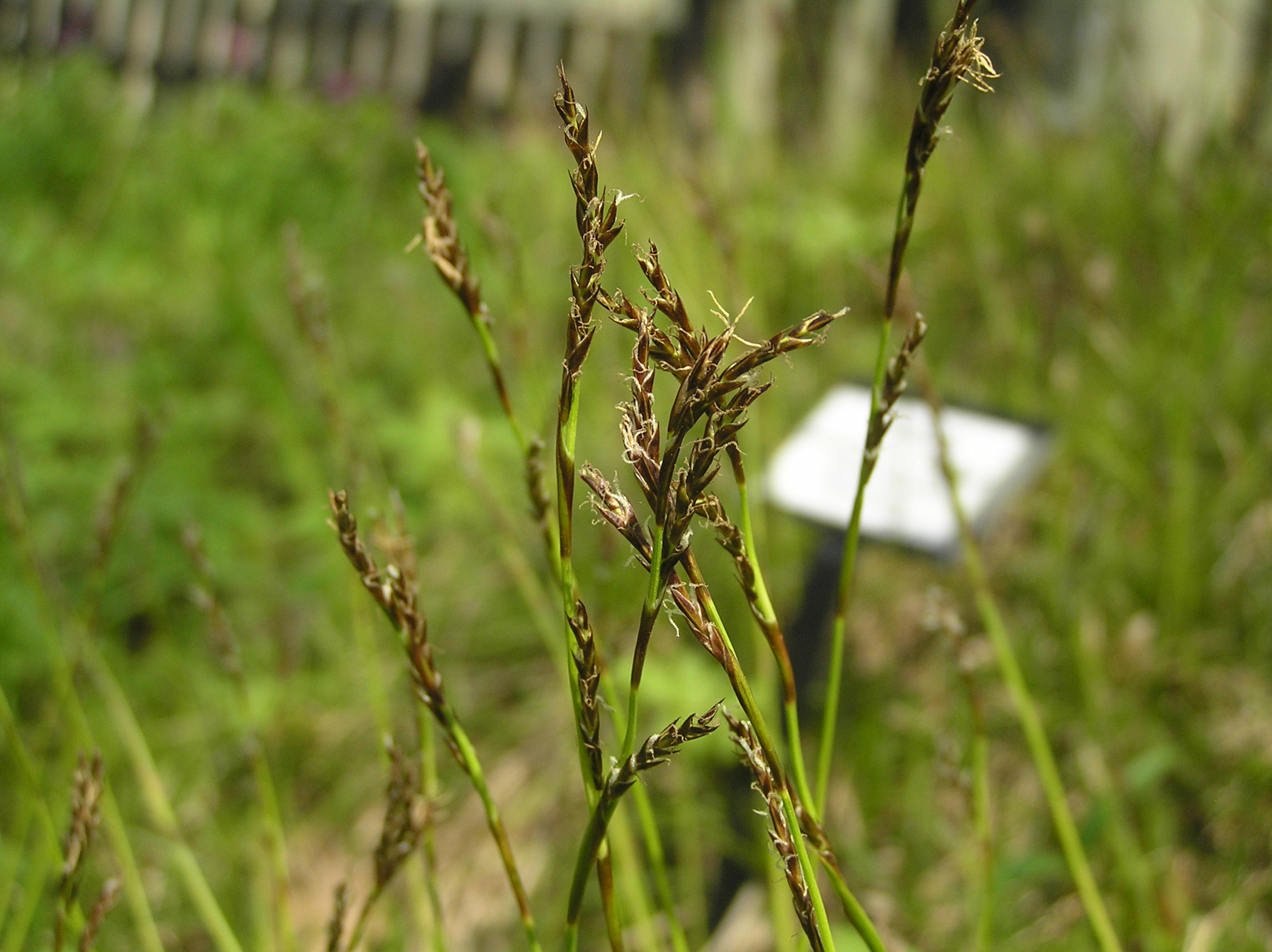
- In the botanical garden of Masaryk University, Czech Republic

Scientific classification
- Kingdom: Plantae
- Clade: Tracheophytes
- Clade: Angiosperms
- Clade: Monocots
- Clade: Commelinids
- Order: Poales
- Family: Cyperaceae
- Genus: Carex
- Species: C. pediformis

Binomial name
- Carex pediformis C.A.Mey

Synonyms
- List: Bitteria pediformis (C.A.Mey.) Fedde & J.Schust.; Carex aneurocarpa V.I.Krecz.; Carex austroussuriensis A.E.Kozhevn.; Carex ayouensis X.Y.Mao & Y.C.Yang; Carex chamissoi Boeckeler; Carex floribunda (Korsh.) Meinsh.; Carex hankaensis Kitag.; Carex kirilovii Turcz.; Carex macroura Meinsh.; Carex macroura subsp. kirilovii (Turcz.) Malyschev; Carex obliqua Turcz.; Carex pellucida Turcz. ex Boott; Carex supermascula V.I.Krecz.; Carex sutchanensis Kom.; Carex woroschilovii A.E.Kozhevn.

= Carex pediformis =

Species of plant

Carex pediformis is a species of sedge (genus Carex), native to Eurasia, from Eastern Europe to Korea. It is a forest-steppe specialist.

== Subtaxa ==
The following varieties are currently accepted:

- Carex pediformis var. macroura (Meinsh.) Kük.
- Carex pediformis var. pediformis
- Carex pediformis var. pedunculata Maxim.
- Carex pediformis var. setifolia Kük.
