= Exapate bicuspidella =

Scientific classification
- Domain: Eukaryota
- Kingdom: Animalia
- Phylum: Arthropoda
- Class: Insecta
- Order: Lepidoptera
- Family: Tortricidae
- Genus: Exapate
- Species: E. bicuspidella

Binomial name
- Exapate bicuspidella Bruun & Krogerus, 1996

Species of moth

Exapate bicuspidella is a species of moth belonging to the family Tortricidae.

It is native to Finland.
